= 20th Alberta Legislature =

Canadian Legislative Assembly

- Majority parliament
- Mar. 10, 1983 – Apr. 10, 1986

Parliament leaders
- Premier: Peter Lougheed; September 10, 1971 – November 1, 1985
- Don Getty; November 1, 1985 – December 14, 1992
- Cabinets: Lougheed cabinet Getty cabinet
- Leader of the Opposition: Grant Notley; November 2, 1982 – October 19, 1984
- Ray Martin; November 6, 1984 – June 15, 1993

Party caucuses
- Government: Progressive Conservative Association of Alberta
- Opposition: New Democratic Party

Legislative Assembly
- Speaker of the Assembly: Gerard Amerongen; March 2, 1972 – June 11, 1986
- Members: 79 MLA seats

Sovereign
- Monarch: Elizabeth II; February 6, 1952 – September 8, 2022
- Lieutenant governor: Hon. Frank C. Lynch-Staunton; October 18, 1979 – January 22, 1985
- Hon. Helen Hunley; January 22, 1985 – March 11, 1991

Sessions
- 1st session March 10, 1983 – March 2, 1984
- 2nd session March 15, 1984 – March 13, 1985
- 3rd session March 14, 1985 – April 2, 1986
- 4th session April 3, 1986 – April 10, 1986
← 19th	→ 21st

The 20th Alberta Legislative Assembly was in session from March 10, 1983, to April 10, 1986, with the membership of the assembly determined by the results of the 1982 Alberta general election held on November 2, 1982. The Legislature officially resumed on March 10, 1983, and continued until the fourth session was prorogued and dissolved on April 10, 1986, prior to the 1986 Alberta general election on May 8, 1986.

Alberta's twentieth government was controlled by the majority Progressive Conservative Association of Alberta for the fourth time, led by Premier Peter Lougheed until his resignation, he was replaced by Don Getty. The Official Opposition was led by Grant Notley of the New Democratic Party until his death on October 19, 1984, and later Ray Martin. The Speaker was Gerard Amerongen who would serve in the role until he was defeated in the 1986 Alberta general election.

== Party standings after the 20th General Election ==
****	****	****	****	****	****	****	****
****	****	****	****	****	****	****	****
****	****	****	****	****	****	****	****	****	****	****	****	****	****	****
****
****
****
****	****	****	****	****	****	****	****	****	****	****	****	****	****	****	****	****
****	****	****	****	****	****	****	****	****	****	****	****	****	****	****	****	****
****	****	****	****	****	****	****	****	****	****	****	****	****	****	****	****	****

Affiliation	Members
Progressive Conservative	75
New Democratic	2
Independent	2
Total	79

- A party requires four seats to have official party status in the legislature. Parties with fewer than four seats are not entitled to party funding although their members will usually be permitted to sit together in the chamber.

== Members elected ==
For complete electoral history, see individual districts.

20th Alberta Legislative Assembly
District	Member	Party	First elected/ previously elected	No.# of term(s)
Athabasca	Frank Pierpoint Appleby	Progressive Conservative	1971	4th term
Banff-Cochrane	Greg Stevens	Progressive Conservative	1979	2nd term
Barrhead	Ken Kowalski	Progressive Conservative	1979	2nd term
Bonnyville	Ernie Isley	Progressive Conservative	1979	2nd term
Bow Valley	Tom Musgrove	Progressive Conservative	1982	1st term
Calgary-Bow	Neil Webber	Progressive Conservative	1975	3rd term
Calgary-Buffalo	Brian Lee	Progressive Conservative	1982	1st term
Calgary-Currie	Dennis Anderson	Progressive Conservative	1979	2nd term
Calgary-Egmont	David J. Carter	Progressive Conservative	1979	2nd term
Calgary-Elbow	David John Russell	Progressive Conservative	1967	5th term
Calgary-Fish Creek	William Edward Payne	Progressive Conservative	1979	2nd term
Calgary-Foothills	Janet Koper	Progressive Conservative	1982	1st term
Calgary-Forest Lawn	John Zaozirny	Progressive Conservative	1979	2nd term
Calgary-Glenmore	Hugh Planche	Progressive Conservative	1975	3rd term
Calgary-McCall	Stan Nelson	Progressive Conservative	1982	1st term
Calgary-McKnight	Eric Musgreave	Progressive Conservative	1975	3rd term
Calgary-Millican	Gordon Shrake	Progressive Conservative	1982	1st term
Calgary-Mountain View	Bohdan Zip	Progressive Conservative	1982	1st term
Calgary-North Hill	Ed Oman	Progressive Conservative	1979	2nd term
Calgary-North West	Sheila Embury	Progressive Conservative	1979	2nd term
Calgary-West	Peter Lougheed	Progressive Conservative	1967	5th term
Camrose	Gordon Stromberg	Progressive Conservative	1971	4th term
Cardston	John Thompson	Progressive Conservative	1975	3rd term
Chinook	Henry Kroeger	Progressive Conservative	1975	3rd term
Clover Bar	Walt Buck	Independent	1967 (Note: First elected as Social Credit)	5th term
Clover Bar	Walt Buck	Representative	1967	5th term
Cypress	Alan Hyland	Progressive Conservative	1975	3rd term
Drayton Valley	Shirley Cripps	Progressive Conservative	1979	2nd term
Drumheller	Lewis Clark	Progressive Conservative	1979	2nd term
Edmonton-Avonmore	Horst Schmid	Progressive Conservative	1971	4th term
Edmonton-Belmont	Walter Szwender	Progressive Conservative	1982	1st term
Edmonton-Beverly	Bill Diachuk	Progressive Conservative	1971	4th term
Edmonton-Calder	Tom Chambers	Progressive Conservative	1971	4th term
Edmonton-Centre	Mary LeMessurier	Progressive Conservative	1979	2nd term
Edmonton-Glengarry	Rollie Cook	Progressive Conservative	1979	2nd term
Edmonton-Glenora	Lou Hyndman	Progressive Conservative	1967	5th term
Edmonton-Gold Bar	Al Hiebert	Progressive Conservative	1979	2nd term
Edmonton-Highlands	David Thomas King	Progressive Conservative	1971	4th term
Edmonton-Jasper Place	Leslie Young	Progressive Conservative	1971	4th term
Edmonton-Kingsway	Carl Paproski	Progressive Conservative	1982	1st term
Edmonton-Meadowlark	Gerard Amerongen	Progressive Conservative	1971	4th term
Edmonton-Mill Woods	Milt Pahl	Progressive Conservative	1979	2nd term
Edmonton-Norwood	Ray Martin	NDP	1982	1st term
Edmonton-Parkallen	Neil Stanley Crawford	Progressive Conservative	1971	4th term
Edmonton-Sherwood Park	Henry Woo	Progressive Conservative	1979	2nd term
Edmonton-Strathcona	Julian Koziak	Progressive Conservative	1971	4th term
Edmonton-Whitemud	Robert Keith Alexander	Progressive Conservative	1982	1st term
Edmonton-Whitemud	Don Getty (1985)	Progressive Conservative	1967, 1985	4th term*
Edson	Ian Reid	Progressive Conservative	1979	2nd term
Grande Prairie	Bob Elliott	Progressive Conservative	1982	1st term
Highwood	Harry Alger	Progressive Conservative	1982	1st term
Innisfail	Nigel Pengelly	Progressive Conservative	1979	2nd term
Lac La Biche-McMurray	Norm Weiss	Progressive Conservative	1979	2nd term
Lacombe	Ronald Moore	Progressive Conservative	1982	1st term
Lesser Slave Lake	Larry Shaben	Progressive Conservative	1975	3rd term
Lethbridge-East	Archibald D. Johnston	Progressive Conservative	1975	3rd term
Lethbridge-West	John Gogo	Progressive Conservative	1975	3rd term
Little Bow	Raymond Speaker	Independent	1963	6th term
Little Bow	Raymond Speaker	Representative	1963	6th term
Lloydminster	Bud Miller	Progressive Conservative	1971	4th term
Macleod	LeRoy Fjordbotten	Progressive Conservative	1979	2nd term
Medicine Hat	Jim Horsman	Progressive Conservative	1975	3rd term
Olds-Didsbury	Stephen Stiles	Progressive Conservative	1982	1st term
Peace River	Al Adair	Progressive Conservative	1971	4th term
Pincher Creek-Crowsnest	Frederick Deryl Bradley	Progressive Conservative	1975	3rd term
Ponoka	Halvar Jonson	Progressive Conservative	1982	1st term
Red Deer	Jim McPherson	Progressive Conservative	1982	1st term
Redwater-Andrew	George Topolnisky	Progressive Conservative	1971	4th term
Rocky Mountain House	John Murray Campbell	Progressive Conservative	1979	2nd term
Smoky River	Marvin Moore	Progressive Conservative	1971	4th term
Spirit River-Fairview	Grant Notley	NDP	1971	4th term
Spirit River-Fairview	Jim Gurnett (1985)	NDP	1985	1st term
St. Albert	Myrna Fyfe	Progressive Conservative	1979	2nd term
St. Paul	John Drobot	Progressive Conservative	1982	1st term
Stettler	Graham Harle	Progressive Conservative	1972	4th term
Stony Plain	William Purdy	Progressive Conservative	1971	4th term
Taber-Warner	Robert Bogle	Progressive Conservative	1975	3rd term
Three Hills	Connie Osterman	Progressive Conservative	1979	2nd term
Vegreville	John Batiuk	Progressive Conservative	1971	4th term
Vermilion-Viking	Tom Lysons	Progressive Conservative	1975	3rd term
Wainwright	Robert Fischer	Progressive Conservative	1982	1st term
Wetaskiwin-Leduc	Donald H. Sparrow	Progressive Conservative	1982	1st term
Whitecourt	Peter Trynchy	Progressive Conservative	1971	4th term
