= 21st Alberta Legislature =

Former Alberta assembly session held in 1986

- Majority parliament
- June 12, 1986 – February 20, 1989

Parliament leaders
- Premier: Don Getty; 1 November 1985 - 14 December 1992
- Cabinet: Getty cabinet
- Leader of the Opposition: Ray Martin; 6 November 1984 - 15 June 1993

Party caucuses
- Government: Progressive Conservative Association
- Opposition: New Democratic Party
- Recognized: Liberal Party
- Representative

Legislative Assembly
- Speaker of the Assembly: David J. Carter; 12 June 1986 - 30 August 1993
- Members: 83 MLA seats

Sovereign
- Monarch: Elizabeth II; February 6, 1952 – September 8, 2022
- Lieutenant Governor: Hon. Helen Hunley; 22 January 1985 - 11 March 1991

Sessions
- 1st session June 12, 1986 – March 4, 1987
- 2nd session March 5, 1987 – March 16, 1988
- 3rd session March 17, 1988 – February 16, 1989
- 4th session February 17. 1989 – February 17, 1989
← 20th	→ 22nd

The 21st Alberta Legislative Assembly was in session from June 12, 1986, to February 20, 1989, with the membership of the assembly determined by the results of the 1986 Alberta general election held on May 8, 1986. The Legislature officially resumed on June 12, 1986, and continued until the fourth session was prorogued on February 17, 1989, and dissolved on February 20, 1989, prior to the 1989 Alberta general election on March 20, 1989.

Alberta's twentieth government was controlled by the majority Progressive Conservative Association of Alberta for the fifth time, led by Premier Don Getty. The Official Opposition was led by Ray Martin of the New Democratic Party. The Speaker was David J. Carter.

== Party standings after the 21st General Election ==
****	****	****	****	****	****	****	****	****	****	****	****
****	****	****	****	****	****	****	****	****	****	****	****	****	****	****	****	****
****	****	****	****	****	****	****	****	****	****	****	****	****	****	****	****	****
****
****
****
****	****	****	****	****	****	****	****	****	****	****	****	****	****	****	****	****
****	****	****	****	****	****	****	****	****	****	****	****	****	****	****	****	****
****	****	****	****	****	****	****	****	****	****	****	****	****	****	****	****	****

Affiliation	Members
Progressive Conservative	61
New Democratic	16
Liberal	4
Representative	2
Total	83

- A party requires four seats to have official party status in the legislature. Parties with fewer than four seats are not entitled to party funding although their members will usually be permitted to sit together in the chamber.

== Members elected ==
For complete electoral history, see individual districts

21st Alberta Legislative Assembly
District	Member	Party	First elected/ previously elected	No.# of term(s)
Athabasca-Lac La Biche	Leo Piquette	NDP	1986	1st term
Banff-Cochrane	Greg Stevens	Progressive Conservative	1979	3rd term
Barrhead	Ken Kowalski	Progressive Conservative	1979	3rd term
Bonnyville	Ernie Isley	Progressive Conservative	1979	3rd term
Bow Valley	Tom Musgrove	Progressive Conservative	1982	2nd term
Calgary-Bow	Neil Webber	Progressive Conservative	1975	4th term
Calgary-Buffalo	Sheldon Chumir	Liberal	1986	1st term
Calgary-Currie	Dennis Anderson	Progressive Conservative	1979	3rd term
Calgary-Egmont	David J. Carter	Progressive Conservative	1979	3rd term
Calgary-Elbow	David John Russell	Progressive Conservative	1967	6th term
Calgary-Fish Creek	William Edward Payne	Progressive Conservative	1979	3rd term
Calgary-Foothills	Janet Koper	Progressive Conservative	1982	2nd term
Calgary-Forest Lawn	Barry Pashak	NDP	1986	1st term
Calgary-Glenmore	Dianne Mirosh	Progressive Conservative	1986	1st term
Calgary-McCall	Stan Nelson	Progressive Conservative	1982	2nd term
Calgary-McKnight	Eric Musgreave	Progressive Conservative	1975	4th term
Calgary-Millican	Gordon Shrake	Progressive Conservative	1982	2nd term
Calgary-Montrose	Rick Orman	Progressive Conservative	1986	1st term
Calgary-Mountain View	Bob Hawkesworth	NDP	1986	1st term
Calgary-North Hill	Fred Stewart	Progressive Conservative	1986	1st term
Calgary-North West	Stan Cassin	Progressive Conservative	1986	1st term
Calgary-Shaw	Jim Dinning	Progressive Conservative	1986	1st term
Calgary-West	Elaine McCoy	Progressive Conservative	1986	1st term
Camrose	Ken Rostad	Progressive Conservative	1986	1st term
Cardston	Jack Ady	Progressive Conservative	1986	1st term
Chinook	Henry Kroeger	Progressive Conservative	1975	4th term
Chinook	Shirley McClellan (1987)	Progressive Conservative	1987	1st term
Clover Bar	Walt Buck	Representative	1967 (Note: First elected as Social Credit)	6th term
Cypress-Redcliff	Alan Hyland	Progressive Conservative	1975	4th term
Drayton Valley	Shirley Cripps	Progressive Conservative	1979	3rd term
Drumheller	Stanley Schumacher	Progressive Conservative	1986	1st term
Dunvegan	Glen Clegg	Progressive Conservative	1986	1st term
Edmonton-Avonmore	Marie Laing	NDP	1986	1st term
Edmonton-Belmont	Tom Sigurdson	NDP	1986	1st term
Edmonton-Beverly	Ed Ewasiuk	NDP	1986	1st term
Edmonton-Calder	Christie Mjolsness	NDP	1986	1st term
Edmonton-Centre	William Roberts	NDP	1986	1st term
Edmonton-Glengarry	John Younie	NDP	1986	1st term
Edmonton-Glenora	Nancy Betkowski (Note: Nancy Betkowski later changed her last name to Nancy MacBeth.)	Progressive Conservative	1986	1st term
Edmonton-Gold Bar	Bettie Hewes	Liberal	1986	1st term
Edmonton-Highlands	Pam Barrett	NDP	1986	1st term
Edmonton-Jasper Place	Leslie Young	Progressive Conservative	1971	5th term
Edmonton-Kingsway	Alex McEachern	NDP	1986	1st term
Edmonton-Meadowlark	Grant Mitchell	Liberal	1986	1st term
Edmonton-Mill Woods	Gerry Gibeault	NDP	1986	1st term
Edmonton-Norwood	Ray Martin	NDP	1982	2nd term
Edmonton-Parkallen	Neil Stanley Crawford	Progressive Conservative	1971	5th term
Edmonton-Strathcona	Gordon Wright	NDP	1986	1st term
Edmonton-Whitemud	Don Getty	Progressive Conservative	1967, 1985	5th term*
Fort McMurray	Norm Weiss	Progressive Conservative	1979	3rd term
Grande Prairie	Bob Elliott	Progressive Conservative	1982	2nd term
Highwood	Harry Alger	Progressive Conservative	1982	2nd term
Innisfail	Nigel Pengelly	Progressive Conservative	1979	3rd term
Lacombe	Ronald Moore	Progressive Conservative	1982	2nd term
Lesser Slave Lake	Larry Shaben	Progressive Conservative	1975	4th term
Lethbridge-East	Archibald D. Johnston	Progressive Conservative	1975	4th term
Lethbridge-West	John Gogo	Progressive Conservative	1975	4th term
Little Bow	Raymond Speaker	Representative	1963	7th term
Little Bow	Raymond Speaker	Progressive Conservative	1963	7th term
Lloydminster	Doug Cherry	Progressive Conservative	1986	1st term
Macleod	LeRoy Fjordbotten	Progressive Conservative	1979	3rd term
Medicine Hat	Jim Horsman	Progressive Conservative	1975	4th term
Olds-Didsbury	Roy Brassard	Progressive Conservative	1986	1st term
Peace River	Al Adair	Progressive Conservative	1971	5th term
Pincher Creek-Crowsnest	Frederick Deryl Bradley	Progressive Conservative	1975	4th term
Ponoka-Rimbey	Halvar Jonson	Progressive Conservative	1982	2nd term
Red Deer-North	Stockwell Day	Progressive Conservative	1986	1st term
Red Deer-South	John Oldring	Progressive Conservative	1986	1st term
Redwater-Andrew	Steve Zarusky	Progressive Conservative	1986	1st term
Rocky Mountain House	John Murray Campbell	Progressive Conservative	1979	3rd term
Sherwood Park	Peter Elzinga	Progressive Conservative	1986	1st term
Smoky River	Marvin Moore	Progressive Conservative	1971	5th term
St. Albert	Bryan Strong	NDP	1986	1st term
St. Paul	John Drobot	Progressive Conservative	1982	2nd term
Stettler	Brian C. Downey	Progressive Conservative	1986	1st term
Stony Plain	Jim Heron	Progressive Conservative	1986	1st term
Taber-Warner	Robert Bogle	Progressive Conservative	1975	4th term
Three Hills	Connie Osterman	Progressive Conservative	1979	3rd term
Vegreville	Derek Fox	NDP	1986	1st term
Vermilion-Viking	Steve West	Progressive Conservative	1986	1st term
Wainwright	Robert Fischer	Progressive Conservative	1982	2nd term
Westlock-Sturgeon	Nicholas Taylor	Liberal	1986	1st term
West Yellowhead	Ian Reid	Progressive Conservative	1979	3rd term
Wetaskiwin-Leduc	Donald H. Sparrow	Progressive Conservative	1982	2nd term
Whitecourt	Peter Trynchy	Progressive Conservative	1971	5th term
