= 19th Alberta Legislature =

- Majority parliament
- May. 24, 1979 – Oct. 5, 1982

Parliament leaders
- Premier: Peter Lougheed; September 10, 1971 – November 1, 1985
- Cabinet: Lougheed cabinet
- Leader of the Opposition: Robert Curtis Clark; September 15, 1973 – November 28, 1980
- Raymond Speaker; December 16, 1980 – November 1, 1982

Party caucuses
- Government: Progressive Conservative Association of Alberta
- Opposition: Social Credit Party
- Unrecognized: New Democratic Party

Legislative Assembly
- Speaker of the Assembly: Gerard Amerongen; March 2, 1972 – June 11, 1986
- Members: 79 MLA seats

Sovereign
- Monarch: Elizabeth II; February 6, 1952 – September 8, 2022
- Lieutenant governor: Hon. Ralph Garvin Steinhauer; July 2, 1974 – October 18, 1979
- Hon. Frank C. Lynch-Staunton; October 18, 1979 – January 22, 1985

Sessions
- 1st session May 24, 1979 – November 16, 1979
- 2nd session May 20, 1980 – March 30, 1981
- 3rd session April 2, 1981 – March 30, 1981
- 4th session March 4, 1982 – May 4, 1982
← 18th	→ 20th

The 19th Alberta Legislative Assembly was in session from May 24, 1979, to October 5, 1982, with the membership of the assembly determined by the results of the 1979 Alberta general election held on March 14, 1979. The Legislature officially resumed on May 24, 1979, and continued until the fourth session was prorogued on May 4, 1982 and dissolved on October 5, 1982, prior to the 1982 Alberta general election on November 2, 1982.

Alberta's nineteenth government was controlled by the majority Progressive Conservative Association of Alberta for the third time, led by Premier Peter Lougheed. The Official Opposition was led by Robert Curtis Clark of the Social Credit Party and later Raymond Speaker. The Speaker was Gerard Amerongen who would serve in the role until he was defeated in the 1986 Alberta general election.

== Seating plan in the 19th Assembly ==
****	****	****	****	****	****	****	****
****	****	****	****	****	****	****	****	****	****	****
****	****	****	****	****	****	****	****	****	****	****	****	****
****
****
****
****	****	****	****	****	****	****	****	****	****	****	****	****	****	****	****	****
****	****	****	****	****	****	****	****	****	****	****	****	****	****	****	****	****
****	****	****	****	****	****	****	****	****	****	****	****	****	****	****	****	****

== Members elected ==
For complete electoral history, see individual districts.

District	Member	Party	First elected/ previously elected	No.# of term(s)
Athabasca	Frank Appleby	Progressive Conservative	1971	3rd term
Banff-Cochrane	Greg Stevens	Progressive Conservative	1979	1st term
Barrhead	Hugh Horner	Progressive Conservative	1967	4th term
Barrhead	Ken Kowalski (1979)	Progressive Conservative	1979	1st term
Bonnyville	Ernie Isley	Progressive Conservative	1979	1st term
Bow Valley	Fred Mandeville	Social Credit	1967	4th term
Calgary-Bow	Neil Webber	Progressive Conservative	1975	2nd term
Calgary-Buffalo	Tom Sindlinger	Progressive Conservative	1979	1st term
Calgary-Buffalo	Tom Sindlinger	Independent Conservative	1979	1st term
Calgary-Buffalo	Tom Sindlinger	Alberta Reform Movement	1979	1st term
Calgary-Currie	Dennis Anderson	Progressive Conservative	1979	1st term
Calgary-Egmont	Merv Leitch	Progressive Conservative	1971	3rd term
Calgary-Elbow	David John Russell	Progressive Conservative	1967	4th term
Calgary-Fish Creek	William Edward Payne	Progressive Conservative	1979	1st term
Calgary-Foothills	Stewart McCrae	Progressive Conservative	1973	3rd term
Calgary-Forest Lawn	John Zaozirny	Progressive Conservative	1979	1st term
Calgary-Glenmore	Hugh Planche	Progressive Conservative	1975	2nd term
Calgary-McCall	Andrew Little	Progressive Conservative	1975	2nd term
Calgary-McKnight	Eric Musgreave	Progressive Conservative	1975	2nd term
Calgary-Millican	David Carter	Progressive Conservative	1979	1st term
Calgary-Mountain View	Stan Kushner	Progressive Conservative	1979	1st term
Calgary-North Hill	Ed Oman	Progressive Conservative	1979	1st term
Calgary-North West	Sheila Embury	Progressive Conservative	1979	1st term
Calgary-West	Peter Lougheed	Progressive Conservative	1967	4th term
Camrose	Gordon Stromberg	Progressive Conservative	1971	3rd term
Cardston	John Thompson	Progressive Conservative	1975	2nd term
Chinook	Henry Kroeger	Progressive Conservative	1975	2nd term
Clover Bar	Walt Buck	Social Credit	1967	4th term
Clover Bar	Walt Buck	Independent	1967	4th term
Cypress	Alan Hyland	Progressive Conservative	1975	2nd term
Drayton Valley	Shirley Cripps	Progressive Conservative	1979	1st term
Drumheller	Lewis Clark	Progressive Conservative	1979	1st term
Edmonton-Avonmore	Horst Schmid	Progressive Conservative	1971	3rd term
Edmonton-Belmont	William Mack	Progressive Conservative	1979	1st term
Edmonton-Beverly	Bill Diachuk	Progressive Conservative	1971	3rd term
Edmonton-Calder	Tom Chambers	Progressive Conservative	1971	3rd term
Edmonton Centre	Mary LeMessurier	Progressive Conservative	1979	1st term
Edmonton-Glenora	Lou Hyndman	Progressive Conservative	1967	4th term
Edmonton-Glengarry	Rollie Cook	Progressive Conservative	1979	1st term
Edmonton-Gold Bar	Al Hiebert	Progressive Conservative	1979	1st term
Edmonton-Highlands	David Thomas King	Progressive Conservative	1971	3rd term
Edmonton Jasper Place	Leslie Young	Progressive Conservative	1971	3rd term
Edmonton-Kingsway	Kenneth Paproski	Progressive Conservative	1971	3rd term
Edmonton Meadowlark	Gerard Amerongen	Progressive Conservative	1971	3rd term
Edmonton-Mill Woods	Milt Pahl	Progressive Conservative	1979	1st term
Edmonton-Norwood	Catherine Chichak	Progressive Conservative	1971	3rd term
Edmonton-Parkallen	Neil Stanley Crawford	Progressive Conservative	1971	3rd term
Edmonton-Sherwood Park	Henry Woo	Progressive Conservative	1979	1st term
Edmonton-Strathcona	Julian Koziak	Progressive Conservative	1971	3rd term
Edmonton-Whitemud	Peter Knaak	Progressive Conservative	1979	1st term
Edson	Ian Reid	Progressive Conservative	1979	1st term
Grande Prairie	Elmer Borstad	Progressive Conservative	1979	1st term
Highwood	George Wolstenholme	Progressive Conservative	1975	2nd term
Innisfail	Nigel Pengelly	Progressive Conservative	1979	1st term
Lac La Biche-McMurray	Norm Weiss	Progressive Conservative	1979	1st term
Lacombe	Jack Cookson	Progressive Conservative	1971	3rd term
Lesser Slave Lake	Larry Shaben	Progressive Conservative	1975	2nd term
Lethbridge-East	Archibald D. Johnston	Progressive Conservative	1975	2nd term
Lethbridge-West	John Gogo	Progressive Conservative	1975	2nd term
Little Bow	Raymond Speaker	Social Credit	1963	5th term
Little Bow	Raymond Speaker	Independent	1963	5th term
Lloydminster	Bud Miller	Progressive Conservative	1971	3rd term
Macleod	LeRoy Fjordbotten	Progressive Conservative	1979	1st term
Medicine Hat	Jim Horsman	Progressive Conservative	1975	2nd term
Olds-Didsbury	Robert Curtis Clark	Social Credit	1960	6th term
Olds-Didsbury	Gordon Kesler (1982)	Western Canada Concept	1982	1st term
Peace River	Al Adair	Progressive Conservative	1971	3rd term
Pincher Creek-Crowsnest	Frederick Bradley	Progressive Conservative	1975	2nd term
Ponoka	Don McCrimmon	Progressive Conservative	1971	3rd term
Red Deer	Norman Magee	Progressive Conservative	1979	1st term
Redwater-Andrew	George Topolnisky	Progressive Conservative	1971	3rd term
Rocky Mountain House	John Murray Campbell	Progressive Conservative	1979	1st term
Smoky River	Marvin Moore	Progressive Conservative	1971	3rd term
Spirit River-Fairview	Grant Notley	NDP	1971	3rd term
St. Albert	Myrna Fyfe	Progressive Conservative	1979	1st term
St. Paul	Charles Anderson	Progressive Conservative	1979	1st term
Stettler	Graham Harle	Progressive Conservative	1972	3rd term
Stony Plain	William Purdy	Progressive Conservative	1971	3rd term
Taber-Warner	Robert Bogle	Progressive Conservative	1975	2nd term
Three Hills	Connie Osterman	Progressive Conservative	1979	1st term
Vegreville	John Batiuk	Progressive Conservative	1971	3rd term
Vermilion-Viking	Tom Lysons	Progressive Conservative	1975	2nd term
Wainwright	Charles Stewart	Progressive Conservative	1975	2nd term
Wetaskiwin-Leduc	Dallas Schmidt	Progressive Conservative	1975	2nd term
Whitecourt	Peter Trynchy	Progressive Conservative	1971	3rd term

== Standings changes since the 19th general election ==
Affiliation	Members
Progressive Conservative	74
Social Credit	4
New Democratic	1
Total	79

Membership changes in the 19th Assembly
Date	Member Name	District	Party	Reason
October 1, 1979	Hugh Horner	Barrhead	Progressive Conservative	Resigned his seat.
November 21, 1979	Ken Kowalski	Barrhead	Progressive Conservative	Elected in a by-election
October 16, 1980	Tom Sindlinger	Calgary-Buffalo	Independent Conservative	Removed from the Progressive Conservative caucus.
November 30, 1981	Robert Clark	Olds-Didsbury	Social Credit	Resigned his seat.
February 17, 1982	Gordon Kesler	Olds-Didsbury	Western Canada Concept	Elected in a by-election.
September 17, 1982	Tom Sindlinger	Calgary-Buffalo	Alberta Reform Movement	Started and lead a new party and formed its caucus.
1982	Raymond Speaker	Little Bow	Independent	Left the Social Credit caucus
1982	Walt Buck	Clover Bar	Independent	Left the Social Credit caucus
