= 22nd Alberta Legislature =

Canadian Legislative Assembly

- Majority parliament
- Jun. 1, 1989 – May. 18, 1993

Parliament leaders
- Premier: Don Getty; 1 November 1985 – 14 December 1992
- Ralph Klein; 14 December 1992 – 14 December 2006
- Cabinets: Getty cabinet Klein cabinet
- Leader of the Opposition: Ray Martin; 6 November 1984 – 15 June 1993

Party caucuses
- Government: Progressive Conservative Association
- Opposition: New Democratic Party
- Recognized: Liberal Party

Legislative Assembly
- Speaker of the Assembly: David J. Carter; 12 June 1986 – 30 August 1993
- Government House leader: Jim Horsman; April 14, 1989 – February 19, 1992
- Fred Stewart; February 20, 1992 – December 14, 1992
- Members: 83 MLA seats

Sovereign
- Monarch: Elizabeth II; February 6, 1952 – September 8, 2022
- Lieutenant governor: Hon. Helen Hunley; 22 January 1985 – 11 March 1991
- Hon. Gordon Towers; 11 March 1991 – 17 April 1996

Sessions
- 1st session June 1, 1989 – March 7, 1990
- 2nd session March 8, 1990 – March 13, 1991
- 3rd session March 14, 1991 – March 18, 1992
- 4th session March 19, 1992 – May 17, 1993
← 21st	→ 23rd

The 22nd Alberta Legislative Assembly was in session from June 1, 1989, to May 18, 1993, with the membership of the assembly determined by the results of the 1989 Alberta general election held on March 20, 1989. The Legislature officially resumed on June 1, 1989, and continued until the fourth session was prorogued and dissolved on May 18, 1993, prior to the 1993 Alberta general election on June 15, 1993.

Alberta's twenty-second government was controlled by the majority Progressive Conservative Association of Alberta, led by Premier Don Getty until his resignation, he was replaced by Ralph Klein. The Official Opposition was led by Ray Martin of the New Democratic Party. The Speaker was David J. Carter.

== Party standings after the 22nd General Election ==
****	****	****	****	****	****	****	****	****	****	****	****	****	****	****	****
****	****	****	****	****	****	****	****	****	****	****	****	****	****	****	****	****
****	****	****	****	****	****	****	****	****	****	****	****	****	****	****	****	****
****
****
****
****	****	****	****	****	****	****	****	****	****	****	****	****	****	****	****	****
****	****	****	****	****	****	****	****	****	****	****	****	****	****	****	****	****
****	****	****	****	****	****	****	****	****	****	****	****	****	****	****	****	****

Affiliation	Members
Progressive Conservative	59
New Democratic	16
Liberal	8
Total	83

== Fourth Sitting Speech from the Throne ==
In an unusual move, Lieutenant Governor Gordon Towers would announce the Fourth Sitting of the 22nd Alberta Legislature would open with a "90 minute state-of-affairs address" rather than the traditional Speech from the Throne. Towers' reasoning for the change was the session would only last a couple weeks until the 1993 Alberta general election would be called.

== Members elected ==
For complete electoral history, see individual districts

District	Member	Party	First elected/ previously elected	No.# of term(s)
Athabasca-Lac La Biche	Mike Cardinal	Progressive Conservative	1989	1st term
Banff-Cochrane	Brian Evans	Progressive Conservative	1989	1st term
Barrhead	Ken Kowalski	Progressive Conservative	1979	4th term
Bonnyville	Ernie Isley	Progressive Conservative	1979	4th term
Bow Valley	Tom Musgrove	Progressive Conservative	1982	3rd term
Calgary-Bow	Bonnie Laing	Progressive Conservative	1989	1st term
Calgary-Buffalo	Sheldon Chumir	Liberal	1986	2nd term
Calgary-Buffalo	Gary Dickson (1992)	Liberal	1992	1st term
Calgary Currie	Dennis Anderson	Progressive Conservative	1979	4th term
Calgary-Egmont	David J. Carter	Progressive Conservative	1979	4th term
Calgary-Elbow	Ralph Klein	Progressive Conservative	1989	1st term
Calgary-Fish Creek	William Edward Payne	Progressive Conservative	1979	4th term
Calgary-Foothills	Pat Black^{2}	Progressive Conservative	1989	1st term
Calgary-Forest Lawn	Barry Pashak	NDP	1986	2nd term
Calgary-Glenmore	Dianne Mirosh	Progressive Conservative	1986	2nd term
Calgary-McCall	Stan Nelson	Progressive Conservative	1982	3rd term
Calgary-McKnight	Yolande Gagnon	Liberal	1989	1st term
Calgary-Millican	Gordon Shrake	Progressive Conservative	1982	3rd term
Calgary-Montrose	Rick Orman	Progressive Conservative	1986	2nd term
Calgary-Mountain View	Bob Hawkesworth	NDP	1986	2nd term
Calgary-North Hill	Fred Stewart	Progressive Conservative	1986	2nd term
Calgary-North West	Frank Bruseker	Liberal	1989	1st term
Calgary-Shaw	Jim Dinning	Progressive Conservative	1986	2nd term
Calgary-West	Elaine McCoy	Progressive Conservative	1986	2nd term
Camrose	Ken Rostad	Progressive Conservative	1986	2nd term
Cardston	Jack Ady	Progressive Conservative	1986	2nd term
Chinook	Shirley McClellan	Progressive Conservative	1987	2nd term
Clover Bar	Kurt Gesell	Progressive Conservative	1989	1st term
Clover Bar	Kurt Gesell	Independent	1989	1st term
Cypress-Redcliff	Alan Hyland	Progressive Conservative	1975	5th term
Drayton Valley	Tom Thurber	Progressive Conservative	1989	1st term
Drumheller	Stanley Schumacher	Progressive Conservative	1986	2nd term
Dunvegan	Glen Clegg	Progressive Conservative	1986	2nd term
Edmonton-Avonmore	Marie Laing	NDP	1986	2nd term
Edmonton-Belmont	Tom Sigurdson	NDP	1986	2nd term
Edmonton-Beverly	Ed Ewasiuk	NDP	1986	2nd term
Edmonton-Calder	Christie Mjolsness	NDP	1986	2nd term
Edmonton Centre	William Roberts	NDP	1986	2nd term
Edmonton-Glengarry	Laurence Decore	Liberal	1989	1st term
Edmonton-Glenora	Nancy Betkowski ^{1}	Progressive Conservative	1986	2nd term
Edmonton-Gold Bar	Bettie Hewes	Liberal	1986	2nd term
Edmonton-Highlands	Pam Barrett	NDP	1986	2nd term
Edmonton Jasper Place	John McInnis	NDP	1989	1st term
Edmonton-Kingsway	Alex McEachern	NDP	1986	2nd term
Edmonton Meadowlark	Grant Mitchell	Liberal	1986	2nd term
Edmonton-Mill Woods	Gerry Gibeault	NDP	1986	2nd term
Edmonton Norwood	Ray Martin	NDP	1982	3rd term
Edmonton-Parkallen	Doug Main	Progressive Conservative	1989	1st term
Edmonton-Strathcona	Gordon Wright	NDP	1986	2nd term
Edmonton-Strathcona	Barrie Chivers (1990)	NDP	1990	1st term
Edmonton-Whitemud	Percy Wickman	Liberal	1989	1st term
Fort McMurray	Norm Weiss	Progressive Conservative	1979	4th term
Grande Prairie	Bob Elliott	Progressive Conservative	1982	3rd term
Highwood	Don Tannas	Progressive Conservative	1989	1st term
Innisfail	Gary Severtson	Progressive Conservative	1989	1st term
Lacombe	Ronald Moore	Progressive Conservative	1982	3rd term
Lesser Slave Lake	Pearl Calahasen	Progressive Conservative	1989	1st term
Lethbridge East	Archibald D. Johnston	Progressive Conservative	1975	5th term
Lethbridge-West	John Gogo	Progressive Conservative	1975	5th term
Little Bow	Raymond Speaker	Progressive Conservative	1963 (Note: First elected as Social Credit)	8th term
Little Bow	Barry McFarland (1992)	Progressive Conservative	1992	1st term
Lloydminster	Doug Cherry	Progressive Conservative	1986	2nd term
Macleod	LeRoy Fjordbotten	Progressive Conservative	1979	4th term
Medicine Hat	Jim Horsman	Progressive Conservative	1975	5th term
Olds-Didsbury	Roy Brassard	Progressive Conservative	1986	2nd term
Peace River	Al Adair	Progressive Conservative	1971	6th term
Pincher Creek-Crowsnest	Frederick Deryl Bradley	Progressive Conservative	1975	5th term
Ponoka-Rimbey	Halvar Jonson	Progressive Conservative	1982	3rd term
Red Deer North	Stockwell Day	Progressive Conservative	1986	2nd term
Red Deer South	John Oldring	Progressive Conservative	1986	2nd term
Redwater-Andrew	Steve Zarusky	Progressive Conservative	1986	2nd term
Rocky Mountain House	Ty Lund	Progressive Conservative	1989	1st term
Sherwood Park	Peter Elzinga	Progressive Conservative	1986	2nd term
Smoky River	Walter Paszkowski	Progressive Conservative	1989	1st term
St. Albert	Dick Fowler	Progressive Conservative	1989	1st term
St. Paul	John Drobot	Progressive Conservative	1982	3rd term
Stettler	Brian C. Downey	Progressive Conservative	1986	2nd term
Stettler	Don Getty (1989)	Progressive Conservative	1967, (Note: Strathcona West) 1985, (Note: Edmonton-Whitemud) 1989	6th term*
Stony Plain	Stan Woloshyn	NDP	1989	1st term
Stony Plain	Stan Woloshyn	Progressive Conservative	1989	1st term
Taber-Warner	Robert Bogle	Progressive Conservative	1975	5th term
Three Hills	Connie Osterman	Progressive Conservative	1979	4th term
Vegreville	Derek Fox	NDP	1986	2nd term
Vermilion-Viking	Steve West	Progressive Conservative	1986	2nd term
Wainwright	Robert Fischer	Progressive Conservative	1982	3rd term
Westlock-Sturgeon	Nicholas Taylor	Liberal	1986	2nd term
West Yellowhead	Jerry Doyle	NDP	1989	1st term
Wetaskiwin-Leduc	Donald H. Sparrow	Progressive Conservative	1982	3rd term
Whitecourt	Peter Trynchy	Progressive Conservative	1971	6th term

- ^{1} Nancy Betkowski later changed her last name to MacBeth
- ^{2} Pat Black later changed her last name to Nelson

== Standings changes since the 22nd general election ==
Membership changes in the 22nd Assembly
Date	Member Name	District	Party	Reason
October 18, 1990	Gordon Wright	Edmonton-Strathcona	New Democratic Party	Death of member.
January 3, 1992	Raymond Speaker	Little Bow	Progressive Conservative	Resigned to run as Reform Party in federal election.
January 26, 1992	Sheldon Chumir	Calgary-Buffalo	Liberal	Death of member.
May 5, 1992	Connie Osterman	Three Hills	Progressive Conservative	Resigned seat.
