= 18th Alberta Legislature =

Canadian Legislative Assembly

- Majority parliament
- May 15, 1975 – February 14, 1979

Parliament leaders
- Premier: Peter Lougheed; September 10, 1971 – November 1, 1985
- Cabinet: Lougheed cabinet
- Leader of the Opposition: Robert Curtis Clark; September 15, 1973 – November 28, 1980

Party caucuses
- Government: Progressive Conservative Association of Alberta
- Opposition: Social Credit Party
- Unrecognized: New Democratic Party

Legislative Assembly
- Speaker of the Assembly: Gerard Amerongen; March 2, 1972 – June 11, 1986
- Members: 75 MLA seats

Sovereign
- Monarch: Elizabeth II; February 6, 1952 – September 8, 2022
- Lieutenant Governor: Hon. Ralph Garvin Steinhauer; July 2, 1974 – October 18, 1979

Sessions
- 1st session May 15, 1975 – December 15, 1975
- 2nd session March 4, 1976 – November 4, 1976
- 3rd session February 24, 1977 – November 10, 1977
- 4th session March 2, 1978 – November 3, 1978
← 17th	→ 19th

The 18th Alberta Legislative Assembly was in session from May 15, 1975, to February 14, 1979, with the membership of the assembly determined by the results of the 1975 Alberta general election held on March 26, 1975. The Legislature officially resumed on May 15, 1975, and continued until the fourth session was prorogued on November 3, 1978 and dissolved on February 14, 1979, prior to the 1979 Alberta general election on March 14, 1979.

Alberta's eighteenth government was controlled by the majority Progressive Conservative Association of Alberta for the second time, led by Premier Peter Lougheed. The Official Opposition was led by Robert Curtis Clark of the Social Credit Party. The Speaker was Gerard Amerongen who would serve in the role until he was defeated in the 1986 Alberta general election.

== Second session ==
During the second session the government introduced The Alberta Heritage Savings Trust Fund Act (Bill 35) creating a sovereign wealth fund to invest oil and gas revenue to ensure the exploitation of non-renewable resources would be of long-term benefit for Alberta. The Alberta Heritage Savings Trust Fund had been announced by Premier Peter Lougheed a year earlier with the intent of diverting funds from the Alberta Petroleum Marketing Commission on the sale of crude oil from April 1, 1974 to diversify and strengthen the economy, improve the life of Albertans, stimulate the economy, and continue to grow with interest.

== Party standings after the 18th General Election ==
****	****	****	****	****	****
****	****	****	****	****	****	****	****	****	****
****	****	****	****	****	****	****	****	****	****	****	****	****
****
****
****
****	****	****	****	****	****	****	****	****	****	****	****	****	****	****	****	****
****	****	****	****	****	****	****	****	****	****	****	****	****	****	****	****	****
****	****	****	****	****	****	****	****	****	****	****	****	****	****	****	****	****

Affiliation	Members
Progressive Conservative	69
Social Credit	4
New Democratic	1
Independents	1
Total	75

- A party requires four seats to have official party status in the legislature. Parties with fewer than four seats are not entitled to party funding although their members will usually be permitted to sit together in the chamber.

== Members elected ==
For complete electoral history, see individual districts.

18th Alberta Legislative Assembly
District	Member	Party	First elected/ previously elected	No.# of term(s)
Athabasca	Frank Appleby	Progressive Conservative	1971	2nd term
Banff	Frederick Kidd	Progressive Conservative	1975	1st term
Barrhead	Hugh Horner	Progressive Conservative	1967	3rd term
Bonnyville	Donald Hansen	Progressive Conservative	1971	2nd term
Bow Valley	Fred Mandeville	Social Credit	1967	3rd term
Calgary-Bow	Neil Webber	Progressive Conservative	1975	1st term
Calgary-Buffalo	Ron Ghitter	Progressive Conservative	1971	2nd term
Calgary-Currie	Fred Peacock	Progressive Conservative	1971	2nd term
Calgary-Egmont	Merv Leitch	Progressive Conservative	1971	2nd term
Calgary-Elbow	David John Russell	Progressive Conservative	1967	3rd term
Calgary-Foothills	Stewart McCrae	Progressive Conservative	1973	2nd term
Calgary-Glenmore	Hugh Planche	Progressive Conservative	1975	1st term
Calgary-McCall	Andrew Little	Progressive Conservative	1975	1st term
Calgary-McKnight	Eric Musgreave	Progressive Conservative	1975	1st term
Calgary-Millican	Thomas Donnelly	Progressive Conservative	1975	1st term
Calgary-Mountain View	John Kushner	Progressive Conservative	1975	1st term
Calgary-North Hill	Roy Farran	Progressive Conservative	1971	2nd term
Calgary-West	Peter Lougheed	Progressive Conservative	1967	3rd term
Camrose	Gordon Stromberg	Progressive Conservative	1971	2nd term
Cardston	John Thompson	Progressive Conservative	1975	1st term
Clover Bar	Walt Buck	Social Credit	1967	3rd term
Cypress	Alan Hyland	Progressive Conservative	1975	1st term
Drayton Valley	Rudolph Zander	Progressive Conservative	1971	2nd term
Drumheller	Gordon Taylor	Independent Social Credit	1940	10th term
Edmonton-Avonmore	Horst Schmid	Progressive Conservative	1971	2nd term
Edmonton-Belmont	Bert Hohol	Progressive Conservative	1971	2nd term
Edmonton-Beverly	Bill Diachuk	Progressive Conservative	1971	2nd term
Edmonton-Calder	Tom Chambers	Progressive Conservative	1971	2nd term
Edmonton-Centre	Gordon Miniely	Progressive Conservative	1971	2nd term
Edmonton-Glenora	Lou Hyndman	Progressive Conservative	1967	3rd term
Edmonton-Gold Bar	William Yurko	Progressive Conservative	1969	3rd term
Edmonton-Highlands	David Thomas King	Progressive Conservative	1971	2nd term
Edmonton Jasper Place	Leslie Young	Progressive Conservative	1971	2nd term
Edmonton-Kingsway	Kenneth Paproski	Progressive Conservative	1971	2nd term
Edmonton-Meadowlark	Gerard Amerongen	Progressive Conservative	1971	2nd term
Edmonton-Norwood	Catherine Chichak	Progressive Conservative	1971	2nd term
Edmonton-Ottewell	John Ashton	Progressive Conservative	1971	2nd term
Edmonton-Parkallen	Neil Stanley Crawford	Progressive Conservative	1971	2nd term
Edmonton-Strathcona	Julian Koziak	Progressive Conservative	1971	2nd term
Edmonton-Whitemud	Don Getty	Progressive Conservative	1967	3rd term
Edson	Robert Dowling	Progressive Conservative	1969	3rd term
Grand Prairie	Winston Backus	Progressive Conservative	1971	2nd term
Hanna-Oyen	John Butler	Progressive Conservative	1975	1st term
Highwood	George Wolstenholme	Progressive Conservative	1975	1st term
Innisfail	Clifford Doan	Progressive Conservative	1971	2nd term
Lac La Biche-McMurray	Ron Tesolin	Progressive Conservative	1975	1st term
Lacombe	Jack Cookson	Progressive Conservative	1971	2nd term
Lesser Slave Lake	Larry Shaben	Progressive Conservative	1975	1st term
Lethbridge-East	Archibald D. Johnston	Progressive Conservative	1975	1st term
Lethbridge-West	John Gogo	Progressive Conservative	1975	1st term
Little Bow	Raymond Speaker	Social Credit	1963	4th term
Lloydminster	Bud Miller	Progressive Conservative	1971	2nd term
Macleod	Thomas Walker	Progressive Conservative	1975	1st term
Medicine Hat-Redcliff	Jim Horsman	Progressive Conservative	1975	1st term
Olds-Didsbury	Robert Curtis Clark	Social Credit	1960	5th term
Peace River	Al Adair	Progressive Conservative	1971	2nd term
Pincher Creek-Crowsnest	Frederick Bradley	Progressive Conservative	1975	1st term
Ponoka	Don McCrimmon	Progressive Conservative	1971	2nd term
Red Deer	James Foster	Progressive Conservative	1971	2nd term
Redwater-Andrew	George Topolnisky	Progressive Conservative	1971	2nd term
Rocky Mountain House	Helen Hunley	Progressive Conservative	1971	2nd term
Sedgewick-Coronation	Henry Kroeger	Progressive Conservative	1975	1st term
Smoky River	Marvin Moore	Progressive Conservative	1971	2nd term
Spirit River-Fairview	Grant Notley	NDP	1971	2nd term
St. Albert	Ernie Jamison	Progressive Conservative	1971	2nd term
St. Paul	Mick Fluker	Progressive Conservative	1971	2nd term
Stettler	Graham Harle	Progressive Conservative	1972	2nd term
Stony Plain	William Purdy	Progressive Conservative	1971	2nd term
Taber-Warner	Robert Bogle	Progressive Conservative	1975	1st term
Three Hills	Allan Warrack	Progressive Conservative	1971	2nd term
Vegreville	John Batiuk	Progressive Conservative	1971	2nd term
Vermilion-Viking	Tom Lysons	Progressive Conservative	1975	1st term
Wainwright	Charles Stewart	Progressive Conservative	1975	1st term
Wetaskiwin-Leduc	Dallas Schmidt	Progressive Conservative	1975	1st term
Whitecourt	Peter Trynchy	Progressive Conservative	1971	2nd term
