= 17th Alberta Legislature =

Canadian Legislative Assembly

- Majority parliament
- March 2, 1972 – February 14, 1975

Parliament leaders
- Premier: Peter Lougheed; September 10, 1971 – November 1, 1985
- Cabinet: Lougheed cabinet
- Leader of the Opposition: Harry Strom; December 10, 1971 – November 22, 1972
- James Douglas Henderson; February 15, 1973 – August 21, 1973
- Robert Curtis Clark; September 15, 1973 – November 28, 1980

Party caucuses
- Government: Progressive Conservative Association of Alberta
- Opposition: Social Credit Party
- Unrecognized: New Democratic Party

Legislative Assembly
- Speaker of the Assembly: Gerard Amerongen; March 2, 1972 – June 11, 1986
- Opposition House Leader: Gordon E. Taylor; March 2, 1972 – February 14, 1973
- Members: 75 MLA seats

Sovereign
- Monarch: Elizabeth II; February 6, 1952 – September 8, 2022
- Lieutenant Governor: Hon. Grant MacEwan; January 26, 1966 – July 2, 1974
- Hon. Ralph Garvin Steinhauer; July 2, 1974 – October 18, 1979

Sessions
- 1st session March 2, 1972 – November 22, 1972
- 2nd session February 15, 1972 – December 14, 1973
- 3rd session March 7, 1974 – November 6, 1974
- 4th session January 23, 1975 – February 14, 1975
← 16th	→ 18th

The 17th Alberta Legislative Assembly was in session from March 2, 1972, to February 14, 1975, with the membership of the assembly determined by the results of the 1971 Alberta general election held on August 30, 1971. The Legislature officially resumed on March 2, 1972, and continued until the fourth session was prorogued and dissolved on February 14, 1975, prior to the 1975 Alberta general election.

Alberta's seventeenth government was controlled by the majority Progressive Conservative Association of Alberta for the first time, led by Premier Peter Lougheed. The Official Opposition was led by former Premier Harry Strom of the Social Credit Party, and subsequently James Douglas Henderson and Robert Curtis Clark. The Speaker was Gerard Amerongen who would serve in the role until he was defeated in the 1986 Alberta general election.

== Fourth session ==
Energy policy came to the forefront near the end of the fourth session of the Legislature when on January 16 a joint press conference was held by the owners of Syncrude Canada Ltd., a joint venture company created to extract oil from the Athabasca oil sands seeking $1-billion in investment following the withdrawal of Atlantic Richfield or risk the failure of the venture. Debate over the proposed investment Alberta's news with proponents noting the high costs of development, necessity for domestic oil supplies during the recent 1973 oil crisis, and the risk of stalling future development in the oil sands, while opponents felt the ultimatum was tantamount to blackmail. All provincial governments were provided the opportunity to invest in the agreement, and on February 3 the Governments of Ontario, Canada and Alberta met with Shell Oil and the original partners in the consortium. The Winnipeg Agreement was announced the next day, where the Government of Canada would invest $300-million for 15 per cent of Syncrude Canada Ltd., and the Government of Ontario would invest $100-million for 5 per cent equity, and Alberta would invest $200-million for convertible debenture and finance a $200-million power plant for the site. Representatives from Shell Oil stormed out of the meeting after an hour after the concession for a government-guaranteed base price for oil sands production was not provided. Liberal leader Nick Taylor and NDP leader Grant Notley were very critical of the agreement.

== Party standings after the 17th General Election ==
****	****	****	****	****	****	****	****	****	****	****	****
****	****	****	****	****	****	****	****	****	****	****	****
****	****	****	****	****	****	****	****	****	****	****	****	****	****
****
****
****
****	****	****	****	****	****	****	****	****	****	****	****	****	****	****
****	****	****	****	****	****	****	****	****	****	****	****	****	****	****
****	****	****	****	****	****	****	****	****	****	****	****	****	****	****

Affiliation	Members
Progressive Conservative	49
Social Credit	25
New Democratic	1
Total	75

- A party requires four seats to have official party status in the legislature. Parties with fewer than four seats are not entitled to party funding although their members will usually be permitted to sit together in the chamber.

== Members elected ==
For complete electoral history, see individual districts.

17th Alberta Legislative Assembly
District	Member	Party	First elected/ previously elected	No.# of term(s)
Athabasca	Frank Appleby	Progressive Conservative	1971	1st term
Banff-Cochrane	Clarence Copithorne	Progressive Conservative	1967 (Note: First elected as Independent)	2nd term
Barrhead	Hugh Horner	Progressive Conservative	1967	2nd term
Bonnyville	Donald Hansen	Progressive Conservative	1971	1st term
Bow Valley	Fred Mandeville	Social Credit	1967	2nd term
Calgary-Bow	Roy Wilson	Social Credit	1971	1st term
Calgary-Buffalo	Ron Ghitter	Progressive Conservative	1971	1st term
Calgary-Currie	Fred Peacock	Progressive Conservative	1971	1st term
Calgary-Elbow	David Russell	Progressive Conservative	1967	2nd term
Calgary-Egmont	Merv Leitch	Progressive Conservative	1971	1st term
Calgary-Foothills	Len Werry	Progressive Conservative	1967	2nd term
Calgary-Foothills	Stewart McCrae (1973)	Progressive Conservative	1973	1st term
Calgary-Glenmore	Bill Dickie	Progressive Conservative	1963 (Note: First elected as Liberal)	3rd term
Calgary-McCall	George Ho Lem	Social Credit	1971	1st term
Calgary-McKnight	Calvin Lee	Progressive Conservative	1971	1st term
Calgary-Millican	Arthur J. Dixon	Social Credit	1952	6th term
Calgary-Mountain View	Albert Ludwig	Social Credit	1959	4th term
Calgary-North Hill	Roy Farran	Progressive Conservative	1971	1st term
Calgary-West	Peter Lougheed	Progressive Conservative	1967	2nd term
Camrose	Gordon Stromberg	Progressive Conservative	1971	1st term
Cardston	Edgar Hinman	Social Credit	1952, 1971	5th term*
Clover Bar	Walt Buck	Social Credit	1967	2nd term
Cypress	Harry Strom	Social Credit	1955	5th term
Drayton Valley	Rudolph Zander	Progressive Conservative	1971	1st term
Drumheller	Gordon Taylor	Social Credit	1940	9th term
Drumheller	Gordon Taylor	Independent Social Credit	1940	9th term
Edmonton-Avonmore	Horst Schmid	Progressive Conservative	1971	1st term
Edmonton-Belmont	Bert Hohol	Progressive Conservative	1971	1st term
Edmonton-Beverly	Bill Diachuk	Progressive Conservative	1971	1st term
Edmonton-Calder	Tom Chambers	Progressive Conservative	1971	1st term
Edmonton-Centre	Gordon Miniely	Progressive Conservative	1971	1st term
Edmonton-Glenora	Lou Hyndman	Progressive Conservative	1967	2nd term
Edmonton-Gold Bar	William Yurko	Progressive Conservative	1969	2nd term
Edmonton-Highlands	David Thomas King	Progressive Conservative	1971	1st term
Edmonton-Jasper Place	Leslie Young	Progressive Conservative	1971	1st term
Edmonton-Kingsway	Kenneth Paproski	Progressive Conservative	1971	1st term
Edmonton-Meadowlark	Gerard Amerongen	Progressive Conservative	1971	1st term
Edmonton-Norwood	Catherine Chichak	Progressive Conservative	1971	1st term
Edmonton-Ottewell	John Ashton	Progressive Conservative	1971	1st term
Edmonton-Parkallen	Neil Crawford	Progressive Conservative	1971	1st term
Edmonton-Strathcona	Julian Koziak	Progressive Conservative	1971	1st term
Edmonton-Whitemud	Don Getty	Progressive Conservative	1967	2nd term
Edson	Robert Dowling	Progressive Conservative	1969	2nd term
Grande Prairie	Winston Backus	Progressive Conservative	1971	1st term
Hanna-Oyen	Clinton French	Social Credit	1959	4th term
Highwood	Edward Benoit	Social Credit	1963	3rd term
Innisfail	Clifford Doan	Progressive Conservative	1971	1st term
Lac La Biche-McMurray	Damase Bouvier	Social Credit	1968	2nd term
Lac La Biche-McMurray	Damase Bouvier	Independent	1968	2nd term
Lac La Biche-McMurray	Damase Bouvier	Social Credit	1968	2nd term
Lacombe	Jack Cookson	Progressive Conservative	1971	1st term
Lesser Slave Lake	Dennis Barton	Social Credit	1971	1st term
Lethbridge-East	John Anderson	Social Credit	1971	1st term
Lethbridge-West	Richard Gruenwald	Social Credit	1971	1st term
Little Bow	Raymond Speaker	Social Credit	1963	3rd term
Lloydminster	Bud Miller	Progressive Conservative	1971	1st term
Macleod	Leighton Buckwell	Social Credit	1967	2nd term
Medicine Hat-Redcliff	William Wyse	Social Credit	1971	1st term
Olds-Didsbury	Robert Curtis Clark	Social Credit	1960	4th term
Peace River	Al Adair	Progressive Conservative	1971	1st term
Pincher Creek-Crowsnest	Charles Drain	Social Credit	1967	2nd term
Ponoka	Don McCrimmon	Progressive Conservative	1971	1st term
Red Deer	James Foster	Progressive Conservative	1971	1st term
Redwater-Andrew	George Topolnisky	Progressive Conservative	1971	1st term
Rocky Mountain House	Helen Hunley	Progressive Conservative	1971	1st term
Sedgewick-Coronation	Ralph Sorenson	Social Credit	1971	1st term
Smoky River	Marvin Moore	Progressive Conservative	1971	1st term
Spirit River-Fairview	Grant Notley	NDP	1971	1st term
St. Albert	Ernie Jamison	Progressive Conservative	1971	1st term
St. Paul	Mick Fluker	Progressive Conservative	1971	1st term
Stettler	Jack Robertson	Progressive Conservative	1971	1st term
Stettler	Graham Harle (1972)	Progressive Conservative	1972	1st term
Stony Plain	William Purdy	Progressive Conservative	1971	1st term
Taber-Warner	Douglas Miller	Social Credit	1967	2nd term
Three Hills	Allan Warrack	Progressive Conservative	1971	1st term
Vegreville	John Batiuk	Progressive Conservative	1971	1st term
Vermilion-Viking	Ashley Cooper	Social Credit	1959	4th term
Wainwright	Henry Ruste	Social Credit	1955	5th term
Wetaskiwin-Leduc	James Henderson	Social Credit	1963	3rd term
Wetaskiwin-Leduc	James Henderson	Independent	1963	3rd term
Whitecourt	Peter Trynchy	Progressive Conservative	1971	1st term
