= Speaker of the Legislative Assembly of Alberta =

Canadian provincial legislative officer

The Speaker of the Alberta Legislative Assembly is the presiding officer in the Legislative Assembly of Alberta.

The Speaker is selected by secret ballot in the first session of a new legislative assembly.

== List of speakers ==
No.	Portrait	Name Electoral district (Birth–Death)	Term of office		Party	Legislature
No.	Portrait	Name Electoral district (Birth–Death)	Term start	Term end	Party	Legislature
1		Charles W. Fisher; MLA for Banff (until 1909); MLA for Cochrane (from 1909) (1866–1919)	March 15, 1906	May 5, 1919	Liberal	1st
1		Charles W. Fisher; MLA for Banff (until 1909); MLA for Cochrane (from 1909) (1866–1919)	March 15, 1906	May 5, 1919	Liberal	2nd
1		Charles W. Fisher; MLA for Banff (until 1909); MLA for Cochrane (from 1909) (1866–1919)	March 15, 1906	May 5, 1919	Liberal	3rd
1		Charles W. Fisher; MLA for Banff (until 1909); MLA for Cochrane (from 1909) (1866–1919)	March 15, 1906	May 5, 1919	Liberal	4th
2		Charles Pingle; MLA for Redcliff (1880–1928)	February 17, 1920	July 18, 1921	Liberal	4th
3		Oran McPherson; MLA for Little Bow (1886–1949)	February 2, 1922	May 25, 1926	United Farmers	5th
4		George Johnston; MLA for Coronation (1884–1977)	February 10, 1927	July 22, 1935	United Farmers	6th
4		George Johnston; MLA for Coronation (1884–1977)	February 10, 1927	July 22, 1935	United Farmers	7th
5		Nathan Eldon Tanner; MLA for Cardston (1898–1982)	February 6, 1936	January 4, 1937	Social Credit	8th
6		Peter Dawson; MLA for Little Bow (1892–1963)	February 25, 1937	March 24, 1963	Social Credit	8th
6		Peter Dawson; MLA for Little Bow (1892–1963)	February 25, 1937	March 24, 1963	Social Credit	9th
6		Peter Dawson; MLA for Little Bow (1892–1963)	February 25, 1937	March 24, 1963	Social Credit	10th
6		Peter Dawson; MLA for Little Bow (1892–1963)	February 25, 1937	March 24, 1963	Social Credit	11th
6		Peter Dawson; MLA for Little Bow (1892–1963)	February 25, 1937	March 24, 1963	Social Credit	12th
6		Peter Dawson; MLA for Little Bow (1892–1963)	February 25, 1937	March 24, 1963	Social Credit	13th
6		Peter Dawson; MLA for Little Bow (1892–1963)	February 25, 1937	March 24, 1963	Social Credit	14th
7		Arthur J. Dixon; MLA for Calgary South (until 1971); MLA for Calgary-Millican (from 1971) (1919–2007)	March 26, 1963	March 1, 1972	Social Credit	14th
7		Arthur J. Dixon; MLA for Calgary South (until 1971); MLA for Calgary-Millican (from 1971) (1919–2007)	March 26, 1963	March 1, 1972	Social Credit	15th
7		Arthur J. Dixon; MLA for Calgary South (until 1971); MLA for Calgary-Millican (from 1971) (1919–2007)	March 26, 1963	March 1, 1972	Social Credit	16th
8		Gerard Amerongen; MLA for Edmonton-Meadowlark (1914–2013)	March 2, 1972	June 11, 1986	Progressive Conservative	17th
8		Gerard Amerongen; MLA for Edmonton-Meadowlark (1914–2013)	March 2, 1972	June 11, 1986	Progressive Conservative	18th
8		Gerard Amerongen; MLA for Edmonton-Meadowlark (1914–2013)	March 2, 1972	June 11, 1986	Progressive Conservative	19th
8		Gerard Amerongen; MLA for Edmonton-Meadowlark (1914–2013)	March 2, 1972	June 11, 1986	Progressive Conservative	20th
9		David J. Carter; MLA for Calgary-Egmont (born 1934)	June 12, 1986	August 30, 1993	Progressive Conservative	21st
9		David J. Carter; MLA for Calgary-Egmont (born 1934)	June 12, 1986	August 30, 1993	Progressive Conservative	22nd
10		Stanley Schumacher; MLA for Drumheller (1933–2020)	August 30, 1993	April 14, 1997	Progressive Conservative	23rd
11		Ken Kowalski; MLA for Barrhead-Westlock (until 2004); MLA for Barrhead-Morinville-Westlock (from 2004) (born 1945)	April 14, 1997	May 23, 2012	Progressive Conservative	24th
11		Ken Kowalski; MLA for Barrhead-Westlock (until 2004); MLA for Barrhead-Morinville-Westlock (from 2004) (born 1945)	April 14, 1997	May 23, 2012	Progressive Conservative	25th
11		Ken Kowalski; MLA for Barrhead-Westlock (until 2004); MLA for Barrhead-Morinville-Westlock (from 2004) (born 1945)	April 14, 1997	May 23, 2012	Progressive Conservative	26th
11		Ken Kowalski; MLA for Barrhead-Westlock (until 2004); MLA for Barrhead-Morinville-Westlock (from 2004) (born 1945)	April 14, 1997	May 23, 2012	Progressive Conservative	27th
12		Gene Zwozdesky; MLA for Edmonton-Mill Creek (1948–2019)	May 23, 2012	June 11, 2015	Progressive Conservative	28th
13		Bob Wanner; MLA for Medicine Hat (born 1949)	June 11, 2015	May 20, 2019	New Democratic	29th
14		Nathan Cooper; MLA for Olds-Didsbury-Three Hills (born 1980)	May 21, 2019	May 13, 2025	United Conservative	30th
14		Nathan Cooper; MLA for Olds-Didsbury-Three Hills (born 1980)	May 21, 2019	May 13, 2025	United Conservative	31st
15		Ric McIver; MLA for Calgary-Hays (born 1958)	May 13, 2025		United Conservative	31st

== See also ==
- Speaker of the House of Commons of Canada
- Speaker of the Senate of Canada

Order of precedence
Preceded by Former Premiers of Alberta	Order of precedence in Alberta	Succeeded by Ambassadors and High Commissioners accredited to Canada
