= Shrake =

Shrake may refer to:

== People ==
- Bud Shrake (1931–2009), American journalist
- Gordon Shrake (born 1937), Canadian politician

== Other ==
- Shrake–Rupley algorithm for the accessible surface area
