= Lloydminster (Alberta electoral district) =

Defunct provincial electoral district in Alberta, Canada

Coordinates: 53.3°N 110.0°W

Alberta electoral district

Defunct provincial electoral district
- Legislature: Legislative Assembly of Alberta
- District created: 1971
- District abolished: 1993
- First contested: 1971
- Last contested: 1989

Lloydminster was a provincial electoral district in Alberta, Canada, mandated to return a single member to the Legislative Assembly of Alberta using the first past the post method of voting from 1971 to 1993.

== History ==
The Lloydminster electoral district was created prior to the 1971 general election to represent Lloydminster and the surrounding area. Prior to the 1971 election, Lloydminster was part of the Alexandria electoral district.

Prior to the 1993 general election, Lloydminster was merged with parts of the former Vermilion-Viking electoral district (which had also been created for the 1971 election) to form the current district of Vermilion-Lloydminster. Since 1971, both Lloydminster and Vermilion-Lloydminster have elected Progressive Conservative MLAs.

=== Members of the Legislative Assembly (MLAs) ===
Members of the Legislative Assembly for Lloydminster
| Assembly | Years | Member | Party |
|---|---|---|---|
See Alexandria electoral district from 1909-1971
| 17th | 1971–1975 | Bud Miller | Progressive Conservative |
| 18th | 1975–1979 | Bud Miller | Progressive Conservative |
| 19th | 1979–1982 | Bud Miller | Progressive Conservative |
| 20th | 1982–1986 | Bud Miller | Progressive Conservative |
| 21st | 1986–1989 | Doug Cherry | Progressive Conservative |
| 22nd | 1989–1993 | Doug Cherry | Progressive Conservative |
See Vermilion-Lloydminster electoral district from 1993-2019

== Legislative election results ==
=== 1971 ===
1971 Alberta general election
| Party | Candidate | Votes | % | ±% |
|---|---|---|---|---|
| Progressive Conservative | Bud Miller | 2,774 | 46.28% | – |
| Social Credit | Campbell A. Hancock | 2,585 | 43.13% | – |
| New Democratic | Lloyd Robertson | 635 | 10.59% | – |
| Total | | 5,994 | – | – |
| Rejected, spoiled and declined | | 25 | – | – |
| Eligible electors / Turnout | | 8,211 | 73.30% | – |
| Progressive Conservative pickup new district. | | | | |
Source(s) Source: "Lloydminster Official Results 1971 Alberta general election". Alberta Heritage Community Foundation.

=== 1975 ===
1975 Alberta general election
| Party | Candidate | Votes | % | ±% |
|---|---|---|---|---|
| Progressive Conservative | Bud Miller | 4,370 | 82.33% | 36.05% |
| New Democratic | Dave Listoe | 938 | 17.67% | 7.08% |
| Total | | 5,308 | – | – |
| Rejected, spoiled and declined | | 25 | – | – |
| Eligible electors / turnout | | 8,135 | 65.56% | -7.75% |
| Progressive Conservative hold | | Swing | | 30.75% |
Source(s) Source: "Lloydminster Official Results 1975 Alberta general election". Alberta Heritage Community Foundation.

=== 1979 ===
1979 Alberta general election
| Party | Candidate | Votes | % | ±% |
|---|---|---|---|---|
| Progressive Conservative | Bud Miller | 4,674 | 78.82% | -3.51% |
| New Democratic | Einar A. Jonson | 680 | 11.47% | -6.20% |
| Social Credit | Patrick A. Moore | 445 | 7.50% | – |
| Liberal | Gregory R. Berry | 131 | 2.21% | – |
| Total | | 5,930 | – | – |
| Rejected, spoiled and declined | | N/A | – | – |
| Eligible electors / turnout | | 9,633 | 61.56% | -4.00% |
| Progressive Conservative hold | | Swing | | 1.35% |
Source(s) Source: "Lloydminster Official Results 1979 Alberta general election". Alberta Heritage Community Foundation.

=== 1982 ===
1982 Alberta general election
| Party | Candidate | Votes | % | ±% |
|---|---|---|---|---|
| Progressive Conservative | Bud Miller | 5,581 | 72.15% | -6.67% |
| Western Canada Concept | Jerry Butz | 1,249 | 16.15% | – |
| New Democratic | Robin Allan | 905 | 11.70% | 0.23% |
| Total | | 7,735 | – | – |
| Rejected, spoiled and declined | | 31 | – | – |
| Eligible electors / turnout | | 11,540 | 67.30% | 5.74% |
| Progressive Conservative hold | | Swing | | -5.67% |
Source(s) Source: "Lloydminster Official Results 1982 Alberta general election". Alberta Heritage Community Foundation.

=== 1986 ===
1986 Alberta general election
| Party | Candidate | Votes | % | ±% |
|---|---|---|---|---|
| Progressive Conservative | Doug Cherry | 3,580 | 69.56% | -2.60% |
| New Democratic | Gary McCorquodale | 1,567 | 30.44% | 18.74% |
| Total | | 5,147 | – | – |
| Rejected, spoiled and declined | | 24 | – | – |
| Eligible electors / turnout | | 12,767 | 40.50% | -26.79% |
| Progressive Conservative hold | | Swing | | -8.45% |
Source(s) Source: "Lloydminster Official Results 1986 Alberta general election". Alberta Heritage Community Foundation.

=== 1989 ===
1989 Alberta general election
| Party | Candidate | Votes | % | ±% |
|---|---|---|---|---|
| Progressive Conservative | Doug Cherry | 3,584 | 66.92% | -2.64% |
| Liberal | Steve McLachlin | 923 | 17.23% | – |
| New Democratic | Gordon E. Swaters | 849 | 15.85% | -14.59% |
| Total | | 5,356 | – | – |
| Rejected, spoiled and declined | | 13 | – | – |
| Eligible electors / turnout | | 11,807 | 45.47% | 4.97% |
| Progressive Conservative hold | | Swing | | 5.29% |
Source(s) Source: "Lloydminster Official Results 1989 Alberta general election". Alberta Heritage Community Foundation.

== See also ==
- List of Alberta provincial electoral districts
- Canadian provincial electoral districts
