= Calgary-Egmont =

Defunct provincial electoral district in Alberta, Canada

Coordinates: 51.03°N 114.04°W

Alberta electoral district
- 2004 boundaries

Defunct provincial electoral district
- Legislature: Legislative Assembly of Alberta
- District created: 1971
- District abolished: 2012
- First contested: 1971
- Last contested: 2008

Calgary-Egmont was a provincial electoral district in Calgary, Alberta, Canada, mandated to return a single member to the Legislative Assembly of Alberta using the first past the post method of voting from 1971 to 2012.

== History ==
=== Boundary history ===
The district, covering southeast Calgary, was created in 1971 boundary re-distribution out of most of the Calgary South and Calgary Glenmore districts. The riding covered the neighbourhoods of Riverbend, Acadia, Fairview, Willowpark, Mapleridge, and Ramsay, Kingsland and Manchester. The riding included a large swath of industrial land including the Highfield Industrial area.

The district was named after Frederick George Moore Perceval, 11th Earl of Egmont who lived in the Calgary area until his death in 2001. His family had at one time 600 acres of ranch land in south Calgary.

Calgary-Egmont was a stronghold for electing Progressive Conservative candidates since its creation in 1971. The district elected four PC representatives over the course of its history.

The Calgary-Egmont electoral district would be dissolved in the 2010 Alberta boundary re-distribution and would be re-distributed into the Calgary-Acadia electoral district.

7 Calgary-Egmont 2003 boundaries
Bordering districts
North	East	West	South
Calgary-Fort	Calgary-Fort, Calgary-Hays	Calgary-Buffalo, Calgary-Elbow, Calgary-Glenmore	Calgary-Fish Creek
riding map goes here		map in relation to other districts in Alberta goes here	
Legal description from the Statutes of Alberta 2003, Electoral Divisions Act.
Starting at the intersection of the left bank of the Elbow River with the Canadian Pacific Railway (CPR) line; then 1. southeast along the CPR line to the right bank of the Bow River; 2. in a generally southerly direction along the right bank of the Bow River to Glenmore Trail SE; 3. southeast along Glenmore Trail SE to Barlow Trail SE; 4. south along Barlow Trail SE to the north boundary of Sec. 16, Twp. 23, Rge. 29 W4; 5. west along the north boundary of the section and the north boundary of Sec. 13, Twp. 23, Rge. 1 W5 to the right bank of the Bow River; 6. west along the north boundary of Sec. 13, Twp. 23, Rge. 1 W5 to the right bank of the Bow River; 7. south along the Bow River to Deerfoot Trail SE; 8. west along Deerfoot Trail SE to Anderson Road SE; 9. west along Anderson Road SE and Anderson Road SW to the Light Rail Transit (LRT) line; 10. north along the LRT Line to Heritage Drive SW; 11. west along Heritage Drive SW to Elbow Drive SW; 12. north along Elbow Drive SW to Glenmore Trail SW; 13. east along Glenmore Trail SW to Macleod Trail S; 14. north along Macleod Trail S to the left bank of the Elbow River; 15. southeast and northeast along the left bank of the Elbow River to the starting point.

=== Representation history ===
Members of the Legislative Assembly for Calgary-Egmont
Assembly	Years	Member	Party
See Calgary Glenmore 1959-1971 and Calgary South 1963-1971
17th	1971–1975	Merv Leitch	Progressive; Conservative
18th	1975–1979	Merv Leitch	Progressive; Conservative
19th	1979–1982	Merv Leitch	Progressive; Conservative
20th	1982–1986	David Carter	Progressive; Conservative
21st	1986–1989	David Carter	Progressive; Conservative
22nd	1989–1993	David Carter	Progressive; Conservative
23rd	1993–1997	Denis Herard	Progressive; Conservative
24th	1997–2001	Denis Herard	Progressive; Conservative
25th	2001–2004	Denis Herard	Progressive; Conservative
26th	2004–2008	Denis Herard	Progressive; Conservative
27th	2008–2012	Jonathan Denis	Progressive; Conservative
See Calgary-Acadia 2012–present

The electoral district was created in the 1971 boundary re-distribution. The first election held that year saw a hotly contested battle between Progressive Conservative candidate Merv Leitch and Social Credit candidate Pat O'Byrne. Leitch edged out O'Byrne to pick up the new district for his party.

Premier Peter Lougheed appointed Leitch to his first cabinet shortly after the election. He ran for a second term in the 1975 general election and won with a super majority of over 75%. He was re-elected to his third and final term in the 1979 general election. Leitch retired his seat in the legislature and from cabinet at dissolution in 1982.

The second representative of the district was Calgary-Millican MLA David Carter who switched districts in the 1982 general election. Carter won the district handily taking over 75% of the vote. He won his second term in the district and third term in the assembly in the 1986 general election. Carter was elected Speaker of the House afterwards. He won re-election the 1989 general election with a reduced majority and retired from the assembly at dissolution in 1993.

Progressive Conservative candidate Denis Herard became the districts third representative when he won in 1993. He faced a strong challenge from Liberal candidate Dick Nichols who polled the strongest non Progressive Conservative vote since 1971. Herard was re-elected three more times winning in 1997, 2001, and 2004. He was appointed to the cabinet briefly in 2006 and retired from office in 2008.

The last representative was Jonathan Denis who won the district for the first time in the 2008 general election after facing a hotly contested and controversial nomination battle against Craig Chandler.

== Legislative election results ==
=== 1971 ===
1971 Alberta general election
Party	Candidate	Votes	%	±%
Progressive Conservative	Merv Leitch	6,791	50.85%	–
Social Credit	Pat O'Byrne	5,503	41.21%	–
New Democratic	Ron Stuart	1,060	7.94%	–
Total		13,354	–	–
Rejected, spoiled and declined		89	–	–
Eligible electors / turnout		18,589	72.32%	–
Progressive Conservative pickup new district.				
Source(s) Source: "Calgary-Egmont Official Results 1971 Alberta general election". Alberta Heritage Community Foundation.

=== 1975 ===
1975 Alberta general election
Party	Candidate	Votes	%	±%
Progressive Conservative	Merv Leitch	10,867	75.82%	24.97%
Liberal	Jack Haggarty	1,634	11.40%	–
Social Credit	Lloyd Downey	1,119	7.81%	-33.40%
New Democratic	Maureen McCutcheon	712	4.97%	-2.97%
Total		14,332	–	–
Rejected, spoiled and declined		24	–	–
Eligible electors / turnout		25,674	55.92%	-16.40%
Progressive Conservative hold		Swing		27.39%
Source(s) Source: "Calgary-Egmont Official Results 1975 Alberta general election". Alberta Heritage Community Foundation.

=== 1979 ===
1979 Alberta general election
Party	Candidate	Votes	%	±%
Progressive Conservative	Merv Leitch	8,083	73.45%	-2.37%
Social Credit	Albert Downton	1,245	11.31%	3.51%
New Democratic	Muriel McCreary	844	7.67%	2.70%
Liberal	Marta Coldham	833	7.57%	-3.83%
Total		11,005	–	–
Rejected, spoiled and declined		22	–	–
Eligible electors / turnout		20,392	53.97%	-1.95%
Progressive Conservative hold		Swing		-1.14%
Source(s) Source: "Calgary-Egmont Official Results 1979 Alberta general election". Alberta Heritage Community Foundation.

=== 1982 ===
1982 Alberta general election
Party	Candidate	Votes	%	±%
Progressive Conservative	David J. Carter	10,331	78.34%	4.89%
Western Canada Concept	Richard A. Langen	1,174	8.90%	–
New Democratic	Leroy Thompson	1,128	8.55%	0.88%
Liberal	Bernie Tanner	396	3.00%	-4.57%
Reform	Victor Lenko	158	1.20%	–
Total		13,187	–	–
Rejected, spoiled and declined		28	–	–
Eligible electors / turnout		20,565	64.26%	10.29%
Progressive Conservative hold		Swing		3.65%
Source(s) Source: "Calgary-Egmont Official Results 1982 Alberta general election". Alberta Heritage Community Foundation.

=== 1986 ===
1986 Alberta general election
Party	Candidate	Votes	%	±%
Progressive Conservative	David J. Carter	5,781	67.04%	-11.30%
New Democratic	Tom Chesterman	1,740	20.18%	11.62%
Liberal	B.C. Tanner	1,102	12.78%	9.78%
Total		8,623	–	–
Rejected, spoiled and declined		18	–	–
Eligible electors / turnout		20,857	41.43%	-22.83%
Progressive Conservative hold		Swing		-11.29%
Source(s) Source: "Calgary-Egmont Official Results 1986 Alberta general election". Alberta Heritage Community Foundation.

=== 1989 ===
1989 Alberta general election
Party	Candidate	Votes	%	±%
Progressive Conservative	David J. Carter	5,272	52.49%	-14.55%
Liberal	Clive R. Mallory	2,907	28.95%	16.17%
New Democratic	Vinay Dey	1,864	18.56%	-1.62%
Total		10,043	–	–
Rejected, spoiled and declined		28	–	–
Eligible electors / turnout		20,494	49.14%	7.71%
Progressive Conservative hold		Swing		-11.66%
Source(s) Source: "Calgary-Egmont Official Results 1989 Alberta general election". Alberta Heritage Community Foundation.

=== 1993 ===
1993 Alberta general election
Party	Candidate	Votes	%	±%
Progressive Conservative	Denis Herard	9,846	58.12%	5.63%
Liberal	Dick Nichols	5,332	31.48%	2.53%
New Democratic	Ken Sahil	1,063	6.28%	-12.29%
Alliance	Les Kaluzny	543	3.21%	–
Natural Law	Linda Fritz	156	0.92%	–
Total		16,940	–	–
Rejected, spoiled and declined		53	–	–
Eligible electors / turnout		28,498	59.63%	10.49%
Progressive Conservative hold		Swing		1.55%
Source(s) Source: "Calgary-Egmont Official Results 1993 Alberta general election". Alberta Heritage Community Foundation.

=== 1997 ===
1997 Alberta general election
Party	Candidate	Votes	%	±%
Progressive Conservative	Denis Herard	8,842	64.69%	6.57%
Liberal	Pam York	3,336	24.41%	-7.07%
Social Credit	Douglas Cooper	836	6.12%	–
New Democratic	Larry Kowalchuk	654	4.78%	-1.49%
Total		13,668	–	–
Rejected, spoiled and declined		45	–	–
Eligible electors / turnout		27,001	50.79%	-8.84%
Progressive Conservative hold		Swing		6.82%
Source(s) Source: "Calgary-Egmont Official Results 1997 Alberta general election". Alberta Heritage Community Foundation.

=== 2001 ===
2001 Alberta general election
Party	Candidate	Votes	%	±%
Progressive Conservative	Denis Herard	10,338	74.28%	9.59%
Liberal	Wayne Lenhardt	2,613	18.78%	-5.63%
New Democratic	Shawn Christie	567	4.07%	-0.71%
Independent	Bradley R. Lang	399	2.87%	–
Total		13,917	–	–
Rejected, spoiled and declined		39	–	–
Eligible electors / turnout		26,749	52.17%	1.39%
Progressive Conservative hold		Swing		7.61%
Source(s) Source: "Calgary-Egmont Official Results 2001 Alberta general election". Alberta Heritage Community Foundation.

=== 2004 ===
2004 Alberta general election
Party	Candidate	Votes	%	±%
Progressive Conservative	Denis Herard	5,686	50.82%	-23.47%
Liberal	Michael Queenan	2,371	21.19%	2.41%
Alberta Alliance	David Crutcher	1,658	14.82%	–
Greens	George Read	875	7.82%	–
New Democratic	Christopher Dovey	599	5.35%	1.28%
Total		11,189	–	–
Rejected, spoiled and declined		51	–	–
Eligible electors / turnout		27,265	41.23%	-10.95%
Progressive Conservative hold		Swing		-12.94%
Source(s) Source: "Calgary-Egmont Official Results 2004 Alberta general election". Alberta Heritage Community Foundation.

=== 2008 ===
2008 Alberta general election
Party	Candidate	Votes	%	±%
Progressive Conservative	Jonathan Denis	5,415	43.61%	-7.21%
Liberal	Cathie Williams	3,289	26.49%	5.30%
Independent	Craig Chandler	2,008	16.17%	–
Wildrose	Barry Chase	676	5.44%	-9.38%
Green	Mark MacGillivray	582	4.69%	-3.13%
New Democratic	Jason Nishiyama	447	3.60%	-1.75%
Total		12,417	–	–
Rejected, spoiled and declined		69	–	–
Eligible electors / turnout		30,070	41.52%	0.30%
Progressive Conservative hold		Swing		-6.25%
Source(s) Source: The Report on the March 3, 2008 Provincial General Election of the Twenty-seventh Legislative Assembly (PDF). Elections Alberta. July 28, 2008. pp. 198–201.

== Senate nominee election results ==
=== 2004 ===
2004 Senate nominee election results: Calgary-Egmont				Turnout 41.25%	
Affiliation	Candidate	Votes	% votes	% ballots	Rank
Progressive Conservative	Bert Brown	5,245	17.69%	54.95%	1
Progressive Conservative	Jim Silye	4,351	14.68%	45.58%	5
Progressive Conservative	Betty Unger	3,996	13.48%	41.87%	2
Progressive Conservative	David Usherwood	2,868	9.68%	30.05%	6
Independent	Link Byfield	2,789	9.41%	29.22%	4
Progressive Conservative	Cliff Breitkreuz	2,650	8.94%	27.76%	3
Alberta Alliance	Vance Gough	2,036	6.87%	21.33%	8
Alberta Alliance	Michael Roth	1,959	6.61%	20.52%	7
Independent	Tom Sindlinger	1,933	6.52%	20.25%	9
Alberta Alliance	Gary Horan	1,816	6.12%	19.03%	10
Total votes		29,643	100%		
Total ballots		9,545	3.11 votes per ballot		
Rejected, spoiled and declined		1,703			
27,265 eligible electors

Voters had the option of selecting four candidates on the ballot

== 2004 student vote results ==
Participating schools
Andrew Davison School
David Thompson Middle School
Fairview Junior High
Green Learning Academy
Willow Park School/ Milton Williams Creative Arts

On November 19, 2004, a student vote was conducted at participating Alberta schools to parallel the 2004 Alberta general election results. The vote was designed to educate students and simulate the electoral process for persons who have not yet reached the legal majority. The vote was conducted in 80 of the 83 provincial electoral districts with students voting for actual election candidates. Schools with a large student body that reside in another electoral district had the option to vote for candidates outside of the electoral district then where they were physically located.

2004 Alberta student vote results
Affiliation	Candidate	Votes	%
Progressive Conservative	Denis Herard	165	30.17 %
Green	George Read	149	27.24%
Liberal	Michael Queenan	118	21.57%
New Democratic	Christopher Dovey	73	13.35%
Alberta Alliance	David Crutcher	42	7.67%
Total		547	
Rejected, spoiled and declined		28	

== See also ==
- List of Alberta provincial electoral districts
- Canadian provincial electoral districts
