= Bryan Strong =

Canadian politician

Member of the Legislative Assembly of Alberta
- In office May 8, 1986 – March 20, 1989
- Preceded by: Myrna Fyfe
- Succeeded by: Dick Fowler
- Constituency: St. Albert

Personal details
- Born: December 24, 1946
- Died: December 25, 2006 (aged 60) St. Albert, Alberta, Canada
- Party: Alberta NDP

Bryan Strong (December 24, 1946 – December 25, 2006) was a provincial politician from Alberta, Canada. He served as a member of the Legislative Assembly of Alberta from 1986 to 1989 as a member of the New Democratic Party.

== Political career ==
In the 1986 Alberta general election, Strong ran in the electoral district of St. Albert as a candidate of the New Democratic Party. He defeated incumbent Myrna Fyfe and former MLA Ernie Jamison. He served a single term and did not run again at the dissolution of the legislature in 1989.
