= Arthur J. Dixon =

Canadian politician in Alberta

Arthur Johnson Dixon

Member of the Legislative Assembly of Alberta
- In office August 5, 1952 – June 18, 1959
- Preceded by: Aylmer Liesemer
- Succeeded by: District abolished
- Constituency: Calgary
- In office June 18, 1959 – June 17, 1963
- Constituency: Calgary South East
- In office June 17, 1963 – August 30, 1971
- Constituency: Calgary South
- In office August 30, 1971 – March 25, 1975
- Succeeded by: Tom Donnelly
- Constituency: Calgary-Millican

Speaker of the Legislative Assembly of Alberta
- In office 1963–1972
- Preceded by: Peter Dawson
- Succeeded by: Gerard Amerongen

Personal details
- Born: December 1, 1919 Windlestone, County Durham, England
- Died: February 5, 2007 (aged 87) Calgary, Alberta
- Party: Social Credit
- Profession: Real estate agent, author and politician

Arthur Johnson Dixon CM (December 1, 1919 – February 5, 2007) was a real estate and insurance agent, and a former member of the Legislative Assembly of Alberta from 1952 to 1975 sitting with the Social Credit caucus in government and opposition. During his time in office Dixon served as the Speaker of the Alberta Legislature from 1963 to 1972.

== Political career ==
Dixon ran for public office for the first time in the 1949 Canadian federal election. He stood as a federal Social Credit candidate in the electoral district of Calgary West. Dixon was defeated finishing in third place in the three way race to incumbent Arthur LeRoy Smith.

Three years later he tried again to win a seat in the House of Commons of Canada by contesting the by-election held on December 10, 1951. He again finished in third place losing to Progressive Conservative candidate Carl Nickle.

A year later Dixon attempt to win a seat to the Alberta Legislature. He stood as a candidate in the 1952 Alberta general election and won the third place seat as a provincial Social Credit candidate in the electoral district of Calgary.

Dixon ran for a second term in office in the 1955 provincial election. He held his seat winning the sixth and final seat in the district.

The Calgary electoral district was abolished in the 1959 boundary redistribution. Dixon ran for his third term in office in the new single member electoral district of Calgary South East for the 1959 Alberta general election. He defeated three other candidates including two Calgary Alderman Ernest Starr and Peter Petrasuk to pick up the district for his party.

Dixon became Speaker of the Legislative Assembly, after the death of Peter Dawson. He ran for re-election in the 1963 Alberta general election. Calgary South East was abolished, causing Dixon to run for re-election in the new district of Calgary South. He defeated two other candidates to easily hold his seat.

After the election Dixon continued with the confidence of the Assembly to remain as Speaker. He ran for a fifth term in the 1967 Alberta general election. In that race he defeated three other candidates including future Prime Minister of Canada, Joe Clark with under half the popular vote to hold his seat.

Calgary South was abolished in the 1971 boundary re-distribution. Dixon ran for re-election in the new electoral district of Calgary-Millican for the 1971 Alberta general election. He managed to easily hold his seat, defeating three other candidates including star candidate Norman Kwong.

As a result of the 1971 election the Social Credit government was swept out of power. Dixon was not returned as speaker of the Assembly when the legislature re-opened in 1972. Dixon remained a private member in opposition. He ran for re-election in the 1975 Alberta general election but was defeated by Progressive Conservative candidate Thomas Donnelly finishing a distant second place in the six way race.

Dixon attempted to win his seat back in the 1979 Alberta general election. He once again finished a distant second place, this time to David Carter.

== Late life ==
Dixon founded Dixon Real Estate Services Inc. while still working as an MLA in 1956. He managed the company until 1990 when his son Tom Dixon took over the business.

Dixon was made a Member of the Order of Canada on June 25, 1979.

In 2000, Dixon founded the William Aberhart Historical Foundation after being encouraged to do so by former Alberta Lieutenant Governor Grant MacEwan.

Dixon returned to the Alberta Legislature in 2006 with Nick Dushenski and Raymond Reierson as the most senior members at the 100th Anniversary celebration of the Alberta Legislature. He died a year later on February 5, 2007.

Dixon was a Christian Scientist, and a long-time member of First Church of Christ, Scientist, Calgary.

== Bibliography ==
- Perry, Sandra E.; Footz, Valerie L. (2006). A Higher Duty : Speakers of the Legislative Assemblies of the North-West Territories and Alberta, 1888-2005. Edmonton, Alberta: Legislative Assembly of Alberta. ISBN 0-9689217-3-6.
