= Richard Gruenwald =

Canadian politician

Richard "Dick" David Gruenwald

Member of the Legislative Assembly of Alberta
- In office 1971–1975
- Preceded by: New district
- Succeeded by: John Gogo
- Constituency: Lethbridge-West

Personal details
- Born: January 22, 1917 Warner, Alberta
- Died: February 24, 2010 (aged 93) Lethbridge, Alberta
- Party: Social Credit

Richard David Gruenwald (January 22, 1917 – February 24, 2010) was a provincial level politician from Alberta, Canada. He served as a member of the Legislative Assembly of Alberta from 1971 to 1975 sitting with the Social Credit caucus in the official opposition.

== Political career ==
Gruenwald ran for a seat to the Alberta Legislature in the 1971 Alberta general election. He won the new electoral district of Lethbridge-West by a wide margin defeating two other candidates to pick it for the Social Credit party who had been defeated from government in that election.

He ran for a second term in office in the 1975 Alberta general election but was defeated in the three way race by Progressive Conservative candidate John Gogo after his popular vote collapsed, he finished a distant second place.
