= Calgary South (provincial electoral district) =

Defunct provincial electoral district in Alberta, Canada

Coordinates: 50.927°N 114.043°W

Alberta electoral district

Defunct provincial electoral district
- Legislature: Legislative Assembly of Alberta
- District created: 1960
- District abolished: 1971
- First contested: 1963
- Last contested: 1967

Calgary South was a provincial electoral district in Calgary, Alberta, Canada, from 1963 to 1971. The district was one of 63 districts in 1963, and 65 in 1967, mandated to return a single member to the Legislative Assembly of Alberta using the first past the post method of voting.

== History ==
The Calgary South electoral district, covering southeast Calgary, was created in the early 1960s from Calgary-South East, Gleichen, and Banff-Cochrane electoral districts. The district was abolished in the 1971 electoral boundary re-distribution to form both Calgary-Egmont and Calgary-Millican electoral districts.

=== Members of the Legislative Assembly (MLAs) ===
Members of the Legislative Assembly for Calgary South
Assembly	Years	Member	Party
See Calgary-South East electoral district from 1959-1963, Gleichen electoral district from 1905-1963 and Banff-Cochrane electoral district from 1940-1963
15th	1963–1967	Arthur J. Dixon	Social Credit
16th	1967–1971	Arthur J. Dixon	Social Credit
See Calgary-Egmont electoral district from 1971-2012 and Calgary-Millican electoral district from 1971-1993

== Election results ==
=== 1963 ===
1963 Alberta general election
Party	Candidate	Votes	%	±%
Social Credit	Arthur J. Dixon	5,661	60.79%	–
Liberal	Howard G. Cook	2,529	27.16%	–
New Democratic	John N. Smith	1,123	12.06%	–
Total		9,313	–	–
Rejected, spoiled and declined		43	–	–
Eligible electors / turnout		21,575	43.37%	–
Source(s) Source: "Calgary-South Official Results 1963 Alberta general election". Alberta Heritage Community Foundation.

=== 1967 ===
1967 Alberta general election
Party	Candidate	Votes	%	±%
Social Credit	Arthur J. Dixon	5,401	41.95%	-18.84%
Progressive Conservative	Joe Clark	4,940	38.37%	–
New Democratic	Jack D. Peters	1,388	10.78%	-1.28%
Liberal	Willis E. O'Leary	1,146	8.90%	-18.25%
Total		12,875	–	–
Rejected, spoiled and declined		59	–	–
Eligible electors / turnout		21,159	61.13%	–
Social Credit hold		Swing		-15.02%
Source(s) Source: "Calgary-South Official Results 1967 Alberta general election". Alberta Heritage Community Foundation.

== See also ==
- List of Alberta provincial electoral districts
- Canadian provincial electoral districts
