= Cypress-Redcliff =

Defunct provincial electoral district in Alberta, Canada

Alberta electoral district

Defunct provincial electoral district
- Legislature: Legislative Assembly of Alberta
- District created: 1986
- District abolished: 1993
- First contested: 1986
- Last contested: 1989

Cypress-Redcliff was a provincial electoral district in Alberta, Canada, mandated to return a single member to the Legislative Assembly of Alberta using the first past the post method of voting from 1986 to 1993.

== History ==
The Cypress-Redcliff electoral district derives its name from Cypress County and the town of Redcliff, Alberta.

Cypress-Redcliff was created following the re-distribution of Cypress electoral district in 1986. The electoral district would only last two elections, and would be re-distributed prior to the 1993 Alberta general election to the Cypress-Medicine Hat electoral district.

=== Members of the Legislative Assembly (MLAs) ===
Members of the Legislative Assembly for Cypress-Redcliff
Assembly	Years	Member	Party
See Cypress electoral district from 1926-1986
11th	1986–1989	Alan W. Hyland	Progressive Conservative
22nd	1989–1993	Alan W. Hyland	Progressive Conservative
See Cypress-Medicine Hat electoral district from 1993-Present

== Electoral history ==
=== 1986 ===
1986 Alberta general election
Party	Candidate	Votes	%	±%
Progressive Conservative	Alan Hyland	2,482	52.56%	–
Representative	Lloyd Robinson	1,682	35.62%	–
New Democratic	Lew Toole	558	11.82%	–
Total		4,722	–	–
Rejected, spoiled and declined		15	–	–
Eligible electors / turnout		9,283	51.03%	–
Source(s) Source: "Cypress-Redcliff Official Results 1986 Alberta general election". Alberta Heritage Community Foundation.

=== 1989 ===
1989 Alberta general election
Party	Candidate	Votes	%	±%
Progressive Conservative	Alan Hyland	2,514	48.90%	-3.66%
Liberal	Lloyd Robinson	1,968	38.28%	–
New Democratic	Rudy Schempp	659	12.82%	1.00%
Total		5,141	–	–
Rejected, spoiled and declined		3	–	–
Eligible electors / turnout		8,935	57.57%	–
Progressive Conservative hold		Swing		-3.16%
Source(s) Source: "Cypress-Redcliff Official Results 1989 Alberta general election". Alberta Heritage Community Foundation.

== See also ==
- List of Alberta provincial electoral districts
- Canadian provincial electoral districts
