= Thomas Donnelly (Alberta politician) =

Canadian politician (1933–1997)

Thomas C. Donnelly

Member of the Legislative Assembly of Alberta
- In office 1975–1979
- Preceded by: Arthur Dixon
- Succeeded by: David Carter
- Constituency: Calgary-Millican

Personal details
- Born: October 13, 1933 Calgary, Alberta, Canada
- Died: April 1, 1997 (aged 63) White Rock, British Columbia, Canada
- Party: Progressive Conservative
- Spouse: Elizabeth Joan (nee Robinson)

Thomas Charles Donnelly (October 13, 1933 – April 1, 1997) was a provincial level politician from Alberta, Canada. He served as a member of the Legislative Assembly of Alberta from 1975 to 1979 sitting with the governing Progressive Conservative caucus. He also served as Deputy Commissioner for Alberta during the 1986 World Expo in Vancouver, British Columbia.

== Political career ==
Donnelly ran for a seat to the Alberta Legislature in the 1975 Alberta general election. He won the electoral district of Calgary-Millican to pick it up for the governing Progressive Conservative party by defeating Social Credit incumbent Arthur Dixon by a wide margin, finishing first in the field of six candidates. He retired from provincial politics at dissolution of the assembly in 1979. Donnelley died in 1997 at the age of 63.
