= Doug Cherry =

Canadian politician

- Born: September 22, 1932; Ladner, British Columbia
- Died: June 16, 2016 (aged 83); Calgary, Alberta
- Education: Lakeland College
- Occupation: Member of the Legislative Assembly of Alberta
- Years active: 1965–1993
- Political party: Progressive Conservative

Douglas Clifford Cherry (September 22, 1932 – June 16, 2016) was a Canadian politician from Alberta. He served as a member of the Legislative Assembly of Alberta from 1986 to 1993.

== Political career ==
Born in Ladner, British Columbia in 1932, Cherry ran as a Progressive Conservative candidate in the 1986 Alberta general election he won a two-way race over NDP candidate Gary McCorquodale to win the electoral district of Lloydminster. In the 1989 Alberta general election, Cherry easily defeating two other candidates to win his second term in office. During his time in office Cherry helped to establish Lakeland College. Cherry retired from provincial politics at dissolution of the legislature in 1993.

Aside from politics, Doug Cherry was a member of the Canadian Armed Forces and served in the Korean War. In between the war and the Alberta Legislature, Doug became a farmer and a councillor for the town of Lloydminster. He died on June 16, 2016, at the age of 83.

Legislative Assembly of Alberta
| Preceded by Bud Miller | MLA Lloydminster; 1986-1993 | Succeeded by District Abolished |
