= Milt Pahl =

Canadian politician (1943–2023)

The Honourable Milton "Milt" George Pahl ECA

Member of the Legislative Assembly of Alberta
- In office 1979–1986
- Preceded by: New District
- Succeeded by: Gerry Gibeault
- Constituency: Edmonton-Mill Woods

Minister without portfolio responsible for native affairs
- In office November 1982 – May 1986
- Preceded by: Don McCrimmon
- Succeeded by: Dave Hancock

Personal details
- Born: October 30, 1943 Hanna, Alberta, Canada
- Died: March 1, 2023 (aged 79)
- Party: Progressive Conservative

Milton George Pahl ECA (October 30, 1943 – March 1, 2023) was a provincial level politician and current businessman from Alberta, Canada. He served as a member of the Legislative Assembly of Alberta from 1979 to 1986. During his time in office he sat as a member of the governing Progressive Conservative caucus. He served as a Member of the Executive Council as Minister without portfolio responsible for native affairs in the Government of Alberta from 1982 to 1986.

== Political career ==
Pahl ran for a seat to the Alberta Legislature in the 1979 Alberta general election. He won the new electoral district of Edmonton-Mill Woods with a landslide to pick up the seat for the governing Progressive Conservative party.

Pahl ran for a second term in office in the 1982 Alberta general election. He more than doubled his popular vote to be re-elected by a substantial margin. After the election Premier Peter Lougheed appointed Pahl to a position in the Executive Council of Alberta as Minister without portfolio responsible for native affairs. He kept that portfolio after Don Getty became premier in 1985.

Pahl was involved in a row with federal Minister of Aboriginal Affairs David Crombie over the Lubicon Lake Indian Nation. The band was promised a settlement of land for a native reserve in 1940. After decades of unrest and negotiation Pahl declared the matter settled in a news conference which Crombie denied. Pahl also announced that subsurface mineral rights will be included with all future land claims settlements with the Government of Alberta.

Pahl ran for a third term in office in the 1986 Alberta general election but was defeated in a closely contested election by Gerry Gibeault a candidate for the New Democrats.

== Late life ==
After leaving politics, Pahl set up a scholarship in his name at the University of Alberta comprising contributions he received from his time in public office awarded annually to a student who completed the first year of the MBA program in the top half of their class.

Pahl later was the President of Native Venture Capital Company, Inc. He died on March 1, 2023, at the age of 79.
