= Myrna Fyfe =

Canadian politician

Member of the Legislative Assembly of Alberta
- In office 1979–1986
- Preceded by: Ernie Jamison
- Succeeded by: Bryan Strong
- Constituency: St. Albert

Personal details
- Born: August 20, 1941 (age 85) Simpson, Saskatchewan
- Party: Progressive Conservative
- Occupation: Hospital President

Myrna Catherine Fyfe (born August 20, 1941) is a retired provincial level politician and hospital administrator from Alberta, Canada. She served as a member of the Legislative Assembly of Alberta from 1979 to 1986.

== Political career ==
Fyfe ran for a seat to the Legislative Assembly of Alberta in the 1979 Alberta general election. She won the electoral district of St. Albert in a landslide defeating three other candidates.

Fyfe ran for a second term in the 1982 Alberta general election. The race for St. Albert was hotly contested that year as former St. Albert MLA Ernie Jamison ran against her. Despite a strong showing by opposition candidates Fyfe won the election with the largest popular vote ever in the St. Albert district.

She would run for a third term in the 1986 Alberta general election. Once again she faced Jamison and this time she was defeated by New Democrat candidate Bryan Strong who won the district by less than 200 votes.

== Awards ==
Fyfe was the 2007 recipient of the annual Capital Health President's Award for lifetime achievement in health and wellness, chosen for the honor by Capital Health boss Sheila Weatherill.

== Late life ==
After her defeat from provincial politics Fyfe was appointed as President of University Hospital Foundation. She served in that position for 21 years before retiring in June 2008.
