= Al Hiebert =

Canadian politician (1938–2000)

Alois "Al" Paul Hiebert

MLA for Edmonton-Gold Bar
- In office 1979–1986
- Preceded by: William Yurko
- Succeeded by: Bettie Hewes

Personal details
- Born: June 4, 1938 Humboldt, Saskatchewan
- Died: April 23, 2000 (aged 61) Edmonton, Alberta
- Party: Progressive Conservative

Alois "Al" Paul Hiebert (June 4, 1938 – April 23, 2000) is a former provincial level politician from Alberta, Canada. He served as a member of the Legislative Assembly of Alberta from 1979 to 1986.

== Political career ==
Hiebert ran for a seat to the Alberta Legislature in the 1979 Alberta general election. He won the vacant electoral district of Edmonton-Gold Bar to hold it for the Progressive Conservatives with a landslide. Hiebert ran for a second term in office in the 1982 Alberta general election. He won the district with a bigger landslide.

Hiebert ran for a third term in office in the 1986 Alberta general election. He lost a significant portion of his popular vote from 1982 and was easily defeated by Alberta Liberal candidate Bettie Hewes. Hiebert did not return to provincial politics after getting defeated.
