= David J. Carter =

Canadian politician

Speaker of the Legislative Assembly of Alberta
- In office 12 June 1986 – 30 August 1993
- Preceded by: Gerard Amerongen
- Succeeded by: Stanley Schumacher

Member of the Legislative Assembly of Alberta
- In office 1979–1993
- Constituency: Calgary Millican (1979–82); Calgary-Egmont (1982–93)

Personal details
- Born: April 6, 1934 (age 92) Moose Jaw, Saskatchewan
- Party: Progressive Conservative
- Education: University of Manitoba; St. John's College, University of Manitoba; Vancouver School of Theology
- Profession: author, minister

David John Carter (born April 6, 1934) is a Canadian politician, clergyman, photographer and author from Alberta. During his 14-year career in the Legislative Assembly of Alberta, Carter served as the 9th Speaker of the Legislative Assembly.

== Early life ==
David John Carter was born April 6, 1934, in Moose Jaw, Saskatchewan to Archdeacon John Wilfred Carter and Mabel Louise Sheward. Carter was educated in Regina and later Medicine Hat. He attended the University of Manitoba completing a Bachelor of Arts in 1958, St. John's College completing a Licentiate of Theology in 1961 and Doctor of Divinity in 1968, and Vancouver School of Theology completing a Bachelor of Sacred Theology in 1968. Carter served on the Senate of the University of Calgary from 1971 to 1977, Dean of the Anglican Diocese of Calgary from 1969 to 1979, and member of the Calgary Exhibition and Stampede Board from 1986 to 1990.

Carter stated in his 2016 book that he was sexually abused by an archbishop at a religious convention in Minneapolis in 1977.

== Political career ==
Carter was elected to the Legislative Assembly of Alberta in the 1979 Alberta general election as a Progressive Conservative from the district of Calgary-Millican, defeating Social Credit candidate and former MLA, Arthur J. Dixon by 1,995 votes. He would move to the Calgary-Egmont district in the 1982 Alberta general election, which he would hold until his retirement from politics in 1993.

Carter was elected as the Speaker of the Assembly in 1986 during the 21st Alberta Legislature, and served through the 22nd Alberta Legislature until his retirement in 1993. As a clergyman, Carter was known for his strict rules as Speaker, going so far as to distribute a list of 172 words which were banned from the Legislature as unparliamentary language. Liberal Party of Alberta leader Nicholas Taylor was often critical of Carter as speaker, called out Carter in 1991 following a resolution to congratulate Baltej Singh Dhillon, the first RCMP officer to wear a turban, was defeated. Taylor yelled "shame" at the government and called Speaker Carter "one of the crappiest speakers [I've] ever seen". Taylor apologized the next day. Carter had previously ordered injured workers arrested for shouting from the public gallery in the Legislature, and controversially attended the Progressive Conservative convention as a speaker. Carter made light of his "iron-fisted" reputation by dawning a Bicorne and posing with Hand-in-waistcoat manner to elicit a comparison to Napoleon, afterwards calling it a "fashion statement", with the official record noting "The speaker adopted a Napoleonic pose".

Carter banned the use of French in the Alberta Legislature in 1987, and refused to let MLA Léo Piquette ask questions in French about French language schooling in Alberta. The Alberta Legislature responded after the Supreme Court of Canada released its decision in R. v. Mercure, [1988] 1 S.C.R. 234 in February 1988 which was addressing whether Section 110 of the Northwest Territories Act allowed French to be spoken in courts and legislatures. Carter allowing members to speak in French, but only if they provided the Speaker with a written translation of their comments, in advance. Carter continued his rivalry with Piquette in the years following, in his book Our Fragile Democracy: In Defence of Parliament Carter calls Piquette "the less than honourable member", and Piquette has countered by calling Carter "the dishonourable Speaker".

In April 1992, Carter came under scrutiny for expenses he accrued as speaker. Carter ordered the cameras in the Legislature to be shut off when a reporter asked why he had billed $22,300 in living expenses from 1990 to 1991, when the speaker was provided an apartment in the Legislature free of charge. Carter had billed a total of $83,000 for living expenses since being elected speaker, and $171,853 in travel expenses. Following the question, Carter pushed Stuart Serediuk, a CFCN cameraman against a pillar in the Legislature and pinned him there in front of several reporters. There was significant public backlash from Albertans and other, including the New York-based Committee to Protect Journalists, which released a statement saying it "finds the assault on Mr. Serediuk deplorable", meanwhile Carter distributed a letter to all MLAs denying he made physical contact with Serediuk. Despite video evidence, CFCN and Stuart Serediuk declined to press charges, as the litigation would have limited the ability for the organization to report on expense abuses by MLAs.

== Later life ==
Cartier filed a lawsuit against the Government of Alberta in 2001 demanding the province cover the $792,064 cost for Stockwell Day's defense in the defamation lawsuit which was settled in 2000 in favour of the plaintiff Lorne Goddard.

Carter has published seventeen books with topics ranging from poetry, short stories, western Canadian history-photography and World Wars I & II.

== Books by Dr Carter ==
- Behind Canadian Barbed Wire
- Prairie Wings
- Inspector F.J. Dickens of the North-West Mounted Police
- The Legislature Ghost - Echoes of the Past
- Reflections - Images and Phrases

== Bibliography ==
- Perry, Sandra E.; Footz, Valerie L. (2006). A Higher Duty : Speakers of the Legislative Assemblies of the North-West Territories and Alberta, 1888-2005. Edmonton, Alberta: Legislative Assembly of Alberta. ISBN 0-9689217-3-6.

Legislative Assembly of Alberta
Preceded by Thomas Donnelly	MLA Calgary Millican; 1979-1982	Succeeded by Gordon Shrake
Preceded by Merv Leitch	MLA Calgary-Egmont; 1982-1993	Succeeded by Denis Herard
Preceded by Gerard Amerongen	Speaker of the Alberta Legislative Assembly; 1986-1993	Succeeded by Stanley Schumacher
