= 1986 Alberta general election =

- May 8, 1986

83 seats in the Legislative Assembly of Alberta 42 seats were needed for a majority
- Turnout: 47.25%
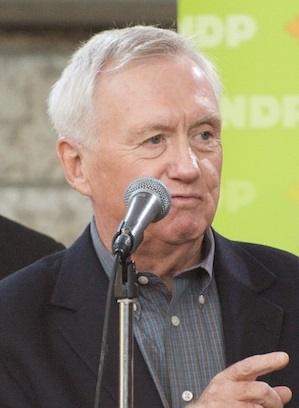
	Majority party	Minority party
Leader	Don Getty	Ray Martin
Party	Progressive Conservative	New Democratic
Leader since	November 1, 1985	November 10, 1984
Leader's seat	Edmonton-Whitemud	Edmonton-Norwood
Last election	75 seats, 62.3%	2 seats, 18.7%
Seats before	75	2
Seats won	61	16
Seat change	▼14	▲14
Popular vote	366,783	208,561
Percentage	51.4%	29.2%
Swing	▼10.9%	▲10.5%
	Third party	Fourth party
	LIB	REP
Leader	Nicholas Taylor	Raymond Speaker
Party	Liberal	Representative
Leader since	March 2, 1974	1982
Leader's seat	Westlock-Sturgeon	Little Bow
Last election	0 seats, 1.8%	pre-creation
Seats before	0	2
Seats won	4	2
Seat change	▲4	±0
Popular vote	87,239	36,656
Percentage	12.2%	5.1%
Swing	▲10.4%	—
Premier before election
Don Getty
Progressive Conservative
Premier after election
Don Getty
Progressive Conservative

The 1986 Alberta general election was held on May 8, 1986, to elect members of the Legislative Assembly of Alberta. The Alberta Progressive Conservatives were re-elected to a majority of seats, this time under a new leader, Don Getty.

Peter Lougheed, who had created the modern Alberta Progressive Conservatives in the 1960s, led it to power in 1971 and served as premier of Alberta for fourteen years, retired from politics in 1985. The PC Party elected Don Getty as its new leader.

Getty did not have the confidence of as many Albertans as Lougheed had, and the party's popular vote fell by ten percentage points. The PCs still won a fifth term in government, with over half the votes in the province, and 61 of the 83 seats in the legislature. While the PC's continued to dominate in Calgary and rural Alberta, unlike previous PC victories the party was badly routed in the provincial capital Edmonton where it won only four seats.

The New Democratic Party, now led by Ray Martin, made itself the focus of opposition to the PC government, winning almost 30% of the vote, and sixteen seats in the legislature (up from two in the 1982 election), mostly in Edmonton where they became the dominant political party. This was a salutary result after the tragic death of its leader, Grant Notley, in 1984. It again took 16 seats in the next election. These two elections were the NDP's best result in any election until it won government in the 2015 election.

The Liberal Party of Nicholas Taylor returned to the legislature for the first time since 1969 with four seats.

Representative Party of Alberta, led by former Social Credit Party of Alberta|Socred minister Raymond Speaker, took two seats. The Social Credit Party of Alberta nominated no candidates, a first in more than 50 years. The party had governed Alberta for 36 years before getting bounced out of power by the Tories in 1971. Unlike the previous 12 elections, it won no seats in 1982. Former Socred minister Raymond Speaker and another veteran Socred MLA, Walt Buck, were elected as Independents in 1982 and had formed the Representative Party of Alberta. Speaker and Buck retained their seats in 1986, but no other RPA candidates were elected.

Western Canada Concept, a western separatist party that had won almost 12% of the vote in 1982, collapsed under the leadership of Jack Ramsay, who later served as a Reform Party of Canada Member of Parliament.

The 22-member opposition in the Alberta Legislature was the largest since 1971. Although the opposition MLAs were still outnumbered three to one by Conservative MLAs, they presented a significant competitive voice to the dominant Conservative Party. The NDP, long the most able, visible and popular opposition group in the Legislature now were granted status of Official Opposition. The existence of the moderately large opposition is counter to the pattern of Alberta both before and after of having minuscule opposition in the Legislature, one party dominance for a long period followed by landslide in favour of a new party. (The minuscule opposition was time after time artificially produced by election system. From 1940 to 1971 Social Credit never received more than 60 per cent of the vote but almost always got than 80 per cent of the seats. The Progressive Conservative from 1971 to 1982 got 46-70 per cent of the votes but each time got about 20 per cent more of the seats than its due.)

Thus the 1986 Legislature was part of a break, short lived as it happened, in the usual pattern of Alberta politics that some describe as ideologically conservative, anachronistic, odd and unpredictable. It was thought by some that Alberta politics was beginning to resemble that of Canada's other provinces.

UofA prof Allan Tupper said the rise of a new, competent opposition was a healthy development in Alberta's politics and would likely contribute positively to Alberta's economic and social well-being.

However, in 1993, the NDP caucus was obliterated, and the Liberal became the Official Opposition. And Conservatives received 61 per cent of the seats (although with only 45 per cent of the votes) and thus still held overwhelming dominance in the Legislature, with a three to two ratio of seats over the opposition.

Ten women were elected to the Legislature in this election - six Conservatives, three NDP-ers and one Liberal.

== Results ==
Overall voter turnout was 47.25%.

Party	Party leader	Candidates	Seats			Popular vote		
Party	Party leader	Candidates	1982	Elected	% Change	#	%	% Change
Progressive Conservative	Don Getty	83	75	61	-18.7%	366,783	51.40%	-10.88%
New Democratic	Ray Martin	83	2	16	+700%	208,561	29.22%	+10.47%
Liberal	Nicholas Taylor	63	-	4		87,239	12.22%	+10.41%
Representative	Raymond Speaker	46	*	2	*	36,656	5.15%	*
Independent		20	2	-	-100%	6,134	0.86%	-3.01%
Western Canada Concept	Jack Ramsay	20	-	-	-	4,615	0.65%	-11.11%
Confederation of Regions	Elmer Knutson	6	*	-	*	2,866	0.40%	*
Heritage	Mike Pawlus	6	*	-	*	601	0.08%	*
Communist	David Wallis	6	-	-	-	199	0.03%	-0.01%
Total		333	79	83	-	713,654	100%	
Source: Elections Alberta

Note:

* Party did not nominate candidates in the previous election.

Popular vote
PC	51.40%
New Democratic	29.22%
Liberal	12.22%
Representative	5.15%
Others	2.01%

Seats summary
PC	73.49%
New Democratic	19.28%
Liberal	4.82%
Representative	2.41%

== Results by riding ==
Electoral district	Candidates					Incumbent
Electoral district	PC	NDP	Liberal	Representative	Other	Incumbent
Athabasca-Lac La Biche	Bill Kostiw; 3,098; 35.97%	Leo Piquette; 3,372; 39.15%	Don J. Corse; 1,942; 22.55%		Peter Mihailuk (WCC); 184; 2.14%	
Banff-Cochrane	Greg Stevens; 4,536; 65.83%	Ed Fisher; 1,452; 21.07%		Betty Ann Stimson; 436; 6.33%	Bill Deacon (Ind.); 444; 6.44%	Greg Stevens
Barrhead	Kenneth R. Kowalski; 5,092; 57.74%	Larry E. McConnell; 2,303; 26.11%	Mary Lou Ehrenholz; 637; 7.22%	Ferne Nutt; 235; 2.66%	Herb Brent (Ind.); 539; 6.11%	Kenneth R. Kowalski
Bonnyville	Ernie Isley; 3,630; 65.24%	Thomas J. Tucker; 1,663; 29.89%			Vern McCaig (WCC); 256; 4.60%	Ernie Isley
Bow Valley	Tom N. Musgrove; 3,395; 57.82%	Vanore Voaklander; 205; 3.49%	Horace Andrew Olson Jr. 1,046; 17.81%	Martha Andrews; 1,220; 20.78%		Tom N. Musgrove
Calgary-Bow	Neil Webber; 5,392; 55.84%	Scott Jeffrey; 3,336; 34.54%	Annyteh K. Pezuolla; 611; 6.33%		Douglas Attfield (Her.); 269; 2.80%	Neil Webber
Calgary-Buffalo	Brian Craig Lee; 3,437; 34.54%	George Chatsis; 1,089; 10.94%	Sheldon Chumir; 5,242; 52.68%	Colin Svendsen; 153; 1.54%		Brian Craig Lee
Calgary-Currie	Dennis L. Anderson; 5,483; 59.52%	Glenn Miller; 1,654; 17.95%	Rork Hilford; 1,842; 20.00%		Peter Grizans (Ind.); 219; 2.38%	Dennis L. Anderson
Calgary-Egmont	David John Carter; 5,781; 66.90%	Tom Chesterman; 1,740; 20.14%	Bernie C. Tanner; 1,102; 12.75%			David John Carter
Calgary-Elbow	David J. Russell; 4,515; 65.16%	Susan C. Liddy; 1,119; 16.15%	Frank Wishlow; 1,268; 18.30%			David J. Russell
Calgary-Fish Creek	William Edward Payne; 7,852; 69.41%	Kerin Spaargaren; 1,882; 16.64%	Lea Russell; 1,553; 13.73%			William Edward Payne
Calgary-Foothills	Janet Koper; 6,111; 55.29%	Thora Miessner; 2,572; 23.27%	Len Wolstenholme; 1,741; 15.75%	J. Allen Howard; 623; 5.64%		Janet Koper
Calgary-Forest Lawn	Moe Amiri; 2,410; 34.55%	Barry Pashak; 2,492; 35.73%	Gene Czaprowski; 1,111; 15.93%	Douglas Williams; 237; 3.40%	Mikey Graham (Ind.); 271; 3.90% Gerald K. Lee (Ind.); 224; 3.22% Independent Dorothy Bohdan (Ind.); 109; 1.57% Independent; Jim Othen (Ind.); 67; 0.96% Bruce Potter (Comm.); 28; 0.40%	John Zaozirny
Calgary-Glenmore	Dianne Mirosh; 5,718; 60.18%	Kelly Hegg; 1,337; 14.07%	Lois Cummings; 2,033; 21.40%		Larry R Heather (Ind.); 384; 4.04%	Hugh L. Planche
Calgary-McCall	Stanley Kenneth Nelson; 5,418; 62.99%	Ken Richmond; 2,435; 28.31%	John J. Gleason; 730; 8.49%			Stanley Kenneth Nelson
Calgary-McKnight	Eric Charles Musgreave; 4,823; 55.01%	Sandra Botting; 2,610; 29.77%	Carol Reimer; 1,307; 14.91%			Eric Charles Musgreave
Calgary-Millican	Gordon Wells Shrake; 3,204; 47.92%	David Davis Swan; 2,512; 37.57%	James Jude Smith; 588; 8.79%	Barry M. Bernard; 148; 2.21%	Dave Wereschuk (Ind.); 209; 3.13%	Gordon Wells Shrake
Calgary-Montrose	Rick Orman; 4,395; 59.63%	Frank Gereau; 2,035; 27.61%	Roly Thomas; 710; 9.63%	Adrian C. Janssens; 218; 2.96%		
Calgary-Mountain View	Jim Prentice; 5,267; 43.39%	Robert Andrew Hawkesworth; 5,524; 45.51%	Doug Rae; 1,139; 9.38%		Tom Erhart (Ind.); 172; 1.42%	Bohdan Zip
Calgary-North Hill	Frederick Alan Stewart; 5,545; 54.26%	Noel Jantzie; 2,940; 28.77%	Pauline Kay; 1,189; 11.64%	Tom Gorman; 511; 5.00%		Ed Oman
Calgary-North West	Stan Cassin; 7,775; 62.40%	Tom Schepens; 3,376; 27.09%	Dean Biollo; 1,284; 10.30%			Sheila Embury
Calgary-Shaw	Jim Dinning; 6,694; 61.38%	Len Curle; 1,166; 10.69%	Brendan Dunphy; 2,727; 25.01%	Byron L. Chenger; 295; 2.71%		
Calgary-West	Elaine McCoy; 6,846; 64.33%	Joseph Yanchula; 2,354; 22.12%	George Francom; 1,390; 13.06%			Peter Lougheed
Camrose	Ken Rostad; 5,312; 54.91%	Gordon Ekelund; 2,269; 23.45%	Ralph Tate; 758; 7.84%	J.A. (Jim) Watson; 697; 7.20%	Jack Ramsay (WCC); 634; 6.55%	Gordon Stromberg
Cardston	Jack Ady; 2,679; 60.08%	Cynthia Cunningham; 389; 8.72%			Steve Pinchak (Ind.); 1,376; 30.86%	John Thompson
Chinook	Henry Kroeger; 3,796; 79.35%	Lavera Gladys Creasy; 959; 20.05%				Henry Kroeger
Clover Bar	Muriel Abdurahman; 2,811; 27.71%	Ken Robinson; 2,085; 20.55%	Barry Shandro; 444; 4.38%	Walt A. Buck; 4,795; 47.26%		Walt A. Buck
Cypress-Redcliff	Alan Hyland; 2,482; 52.40%	Lew Toole; 558; 11.78%		Lloyd B. Robinson; 1,682; 35.51%		
Drayton Valley	Shirley Cripps; 5,330; 61.00%	Lawrence Dublenko; 2,275; 26.04%	Phil J. Gibeau; 594; 6.80%	Ron Williams; 301; 3.44%	Gordon Reid (WCC); 219; 2.51%	Shirley Cripps
Drumheller	Stan Schumacher; 4,906; 60.97%	Sid Holt; 1,154; 14.34%		Norman A. Stanger; 1,729; 21.49%	Peter Hope (Ind.); 244; 3.03%	Lewis (Mickey) Clark
Dunvegan	Glen Clegg; 4,146; 51.05%	Jim Gurnett; 3,944; 48.56%				
Edmonton-Avonmore	Horst A. Schmid; 4,140; 41.17%	Marie Laing; 4,234; 42.10%	Michael Brings; 1,117; 11.11%	Karl R. Badke; 416; 4.14%	Mike Walker (WCC); 140; 1.39%	Horst A. Schmid
Edmonton-Belmont	Walter R. Szwender; 3,160; 30.19%	Thomas Sigurdson; 4,491; 42.91%	Pat Sembaliuk; 2,486; 23.75%	Bette Davies; 198; 1.89%	Joe Kovacs (Her.); 67; 0.64% David Wallis (Comm.); 39; 0.37%	Walter R. Szwender
Edmonton-Beverly	Bill W. Diachuk; 3,917; 34.30%	Ed W. Ewasiuk; 6,699; 58.66%	Jim Shinkaruk; 784; 6.87%			Bill W. Diachuk
Edmonton-Calder	Tony Falcone; 2,910; 28.82%	Christie Mjolsness; 5,114; 50.65%	Al Iafolla; 1,925; 19.07%		Dave Draginda (WCC); 111; 1.10% Martin Robbert (Comm.); 26; 0.26%	Tom Chambers
Edmonton-Centre	Mary LeMessurier; 3,816; 40.21%	William Roberts; 3,976; 41.89%	Douglas Haydock; 1,384; 14.58%		Fred Marshall (WCC); 182; 1.92% Leonard Stahl (Ind.); 103; 1.09%	Mary LeMessurier
Edmonton-Glengarry	Ihor Broda; 3,720; 35.26%	John Younie; 5,371; 50.91%	Hugh W. Burgess; 1,191; 11.29%	Lou Peterson; 147; 1.39%	Herb Lang (WCC); 99; 0.94%	Rollie Cook
Edmonton-Glenora	Nancy Betkowski; 5,193; 52.33%	Jim Bell; 2,918; 29.40%	Colin P. McDonald; 1,352; 13.62%	C.A. Douglas Ringrose; 312; 3.14%	Alice Elaine Moody (WCC); 133; 1.34%	Lou Hyndman
Edmonton-Gold Bar	Alois Paul Hiebert; 4,150; 28.24%	Randy Morse; 4,142; 28.18%	Bettie Hewes; 6,378; 43.40%			Alois Paul Hiebert
Edmonton-Highlands	David T. King; 3,507; 42.37%	Pam Barrett; 4,159; 50.25%	Naseer A. Chaudhary; 417; 5.04%	Todd R.C. Ross; 83; 1.00%	Naomi Rankin (Comm.); 51; 0.62% Cec Garfin (Her.); 30; 0.36%	David T. King
Edmonton-Jasper Place	Leslie Gordon Young; 4,357; 40.01%	Vair Clendenning; 4,286; 39.36%	Karen Leibovici; 1,947; 17.88%	Michael P. Astle; 157; 1.44%	Curtis Long (WCC); 122; 1.12%	Leslie Gordon Young
Edmonton-Kingsway	Allen Wasnea; 3,491; 38.15%	Alex McEachern; 4,669; 51.02%	Patrick Reid; 896; 9.79%		Bowden John Zachara (Her.); 78; 0.85%	Carl Paproski
Edmonton-Meadowlark	Gerard Joseph Amerongen; 4,222; 36.55%	Muriel Stanley-Venne; 2,315; 20.04%	Grant Mitchell; 4,913; 42.54%	R. (Bob) Genis-Bell; 176; 1.52%	Norm Kyle (WCC); 90; 0.78%	Gerard Joseph Amerongen
Edmonton-Mill Woods	Milt Pahl; 4,004; 41.87%	Gerry Gibeault; 4,103; 42.90%	Philip Lister; 861; 9.00%	Richard Mather; 445; 4.65%	Mike Pawlus (Her.); 132; 1.38%	Milt Pahl
Edmonton-Norwood	Catherine Chichak; 1,942; 25.56%	Ray Martin; 5,272; 69.38%	David R. Long; 359; 4.72%			Ray Martin
Edmonton-Parkallen	Neil S. Crawford; 5,612; 44.43%	Jim Russell; 5,310; 42.04%	Jerry Paschen; 1,100; 8.71%	James Carson; 593; 4.69%		Neil S. Crawford
Edmonton-Strathcona	Julian Koziak; 4,467; 37.47%	Gordon S.D. Wright; 6,443; 54.04%	Peter Schneider; 788; 6.61%	Shane Gordon Venner; 102; 0.86%	Dexter B. Dombro (WCC); 72; 0.60% Robin Boodle (Comm.); 26; 0.22%	Julian Koziak
Edmonton-Whitemud	Donald Ross Getty; 7,436; 57.58%	Tony Higgins; 3,875; 30.01%	Eric Wolfman; 1,135; 8.79%	Bert Beinert; 366; 2.83%	Walter Stack (WCC); 92; 0.71%	Keith Alexander
Fort McMurray	Norman A. Weiss; 4,152; 48.49%	Ann Dort Maclean; 3,391; 39.61%	Shane Davis; 1,010; 11.80%			
Grande Prairie	Bob Elliott; 6,239; 61.43%	Bernie Desrosiers; 3,095; 30.47%		Andy Haugen; 557; 5.48%	Roy Housworth (Ind.); 240; 2.36%	Bob Elliott
Highwood	Harry E. Alger; 5,336; 66.32%	William C. McCutcheon; 1,054; 13.10%		Murray Meszaros; 811; 10.08%		Harry E. Alger
Innisfail	Nigel I. Pengelly; 4,309; 65.83%	Tony Mazurkewich; 1,033; 15.78%		Raymond C. Reckseidler; 411; 6.28%	George Conway-Brown (WCC); 472; 7.21% Jack Lynass (C.O.R.); 303; 4.64%	Nigel I. Pengelly
Lacombe	Ron A. Moore; 4,079; 77.71%	Ken Ling; 1,151; 21.93%				Ron A. Moore
Lesser Slave Lake	Larry R. Shaben; 2,529; 56.90%	Bert Dube; 1,892; 42.56%				Larry R. Shaben
Lethbridge-East	Archibald Dick Johnston; 4,567; 51.98%	Sylvia A. Campbell; 2,188; 24.90%	John I. Boras; 2,009; 22.87%			Archibald Dick Johnston
Lethbridge-West	John Gogo; 3,999; 48.50%	Ed Webking; 2,006; 24.33%	Al Barnhill; 1,579; 19.15%	Douglas Pitt; 532; 6.45%	Nora Galenzoski (C.O.R.); 106; 1.29%	John Gogo
Little Bow	Cliff Wright; 1,805; 30.25%	Christina Tomaschuk; 137; 2.30%	Dean Oseen (C.O.R.); 158; 2.65% Ben Loman; 65; 1.09%	Raymond Albert Speaker; 3,791; 63.54%		Raymond Albert Speaker
Lloydminster	Doug Cherry; 3,580; 69.23%	Gary McCorquodale; 1,567; 30.30%				James Edgar Miller
Macleod	LeRoy Fjordbotten; 4,054; 65.93%	Laurie Fiedler; 759; 12.34%		Ed Shimek; 1,303; 21.19%		LeRoy Fjordbotten
Medicine Hat	James Horsman; 7,717; 65.72%	Stan Chmelyk; 1,373; 11.69%	David J. Carter; 2,624; 22.35%			James Horsman
Olds-Didsbury	Roy Brassard; 5,204; 66.36%	Tom Monto; 823; 10.49%			Elmer Knutson (C.O.R.); 1,785; 22.85%	Stephen Stiles
Peace River	Al (Boomer) Adair; 3,775; 59.81%	Adele Gale Boucher; 2,057; 32.59%		Joseph (Little Joe) Kessler; 291; 4.61%	Anna Pidruchney (Ind.); 174; 2.76%	Al (Boomer) Adair
Pincher Creek-Crowsnest	Frederick Deryl Bradley; 3,134; 51.35%	Mike Cooper; 2,948; 48.30%				Frederick Deryl Bradley
Ponoka-Rimbey	Halvar C. Jonson; 3,601; 61.94%	Pat Byers; 1,138; 19.57%	Mel H. Buffalo; 349; 6.00%		Warren Bloomquist (WCC); 701; 12.06%	
Red Deer-North	Stockwell Day; 2,808; 41.48%	Bruce Beck; 1,279; 18.89%	Donald Campbell; 2,372; 35.04%	Elvin Janzen; 153; 2.26%	Brian Flewwelling (Ind.); 146; 2.16%	
Red Deer-South	John Oldring; 4,023; 56.09%	Connie Barnaby; 1,667; 23.24%	Lionel Lizee; 1,455; 20.29%			
Redwater-Andrew	Steve Zarusky; 3,539; 46.55%	Denis Bobocel; 2,761; 36.31%	Adrianus Kuiper; 309; 4.06%	Michael Senych; 981; 12.90%		George Topolnisky
Rocky Mountain House	John Murray Campbell; 3,844; 53.19%	Dolly (Martin) Brown; 1,266; 17.52%	Bob Paston; 622; 8.61%	Lavern J. Ahlstrom; 1,042; 14.42%	Art Carritt (C.O.R.); 436; 6.05%	John Murray Campbell
Sherwood Park	Peter Elzinga; 6,377; 56.41%	Ted Paszek; 3,183; 28.16%	Steven Lindop; 1,541; 13.63%	Ernie Townsend; 196; 1.73%		
Smoky River	Marvin Moore; 4,793; 64.68%	Martin Cree; 1,546; 20.86%	Colin Nash; 272; 3.67%	Conrad LeBlanc; 773; 10.43%		Marvin Moore
St. Albert	Myrna Fyfe; 4,580; 40.70%	Bryan Strong; 4,700; 41.77%	Thomas Henry Droege; 745; 6.62%	William Ernest Jamison; 1,215; 10.80%		Myrna Fyfe
St. Paul	John Drobot; 3,018; 47.82%	Martin Naundorf; 1,429; 22.64%	George Michaud; 463; 7.34%	Roland F. Rocque; 1,380; 21.87%		John Drobot
Stettler	Brian C. Downey; 3,938; 57.68%	Fred J. Rappel; 1,058; 15.50%	Red Peeples; 1,508; 22.09%		Iris Bourne (WCC); 308; 4.51%	Graham L. Harle
Stony Plain	Jim Heron; 4,535; 43.58%	Rick Hardy; 3,046; 29.27%	Ed Wilson; 1,285; 12.35%	Ernest Clintberg; 1,343; 12.90%	J. Richard Dougherty (WCC); 186; 1.79%	William Frederick Purdy
Taber-Warner	Robert Bogle; 4,483; 66.75%	Jim Renfrow; 756; 11.26%		John Voorhorst; 1,442; 21.47%		Robert Bogle
Three Hills	Connie Osterman; 5,924; 83.20%	Vernal Poole; 1,169; 16.42%				Connie Osterman
Vegreville	Ron Rudkowsky; 3,328; 38.82%	Derek Fox; 3,903; 45.53%	John A. Sawiak; 174; 2.03%	Allen Antoniuk; 1,150; 13.42%		John S. Batiuk
Vermilion-Viking	Steve West; 4,228; 71.36%	Mervin Stephenson; 1,671; 28.20%				Tom Lysons
Wainwright	Robert A. (Butch) Fischer; 4,244; 68.44%	Willy Kelch; 1,106; 17.84%	Joseph A. Vermette; 365; 5.89%		Allen Abrassart (WCC); 475; 7.66%	Robert A. (Butch) Fischer
West Yellowhead	Ian Reid; 3,207; 44.73%	Phil Oakes; 3,005; 41.92%	Laurie Switzer; 749; 10.45%		Lorraine Oberg (WCC); 187; 2.61%	
Westlock-Sturgeon	Lawrence Kluthe; 4,049; 34.84%	Bruce Lennon; 1,996; 17.17%	Nicholas Taylor; 4,523; 38.91%	Tom Carleton; 911; 7.84%	Adam Hauch (C.O.R.); 78; 0.67% Laurent St. Denis (Comm.); 29; 0.25% Stan Pearson (Her.); 25; 0.22%	
Wetaskiwin-Leduc	Donald H. Sparrow; 5,823; 55.57%	M. (Dick) Devries; 3,061; 29.21%	Kathleen Crone; 740; 7.06%	Harold L. Schneider; 488; 4.66%	W.L. (Bud) Iverson (WCC); 208; 1.99% John Tolsma (Ind.); 130; 1.24%	Donald H. Sparrow
Whitecourt	Peter Trynchy; 4,038; 54.07%	Richard Davies; 1,349; 18.06%	Rick Allen; 459; 6.15%	Merv Zadderey; 1,611; 21.57%		Peter Trynchy

== See also ==
- List of Alberta political parties
