= Ernie Jamison =

Canadian politician (1924–2003)

MLA for St. Albert
- In office 1971–1979
- Preceded by: Keith Everitt
- Succeeded by: Myrna Fyfe

Personal details
- Born: February 27, 1924 Edmonton, Alberta
- Died: April 11, 2003 (aged 79) Edmonton, Alberta
- Party: Progressive Conservative Association of Alberta

William Ernest "Ernie" Jamison (February 27, 1924 – April 11, 2003) was a publisher and member of the Legislative Assembly of Alberta.

Jamison grew up in Edmonton. Early in his career, he worked as an ad setter for the Edmonton Bulletin. He went on to acquire the Western Weekly, a magazine that circulated with weekly newspapers around Alberta. In an effort to increase circulation of the magazine, he purchased the St. Albert Gazette from Ronald Harvey in 1966. He continued to publish the paper until his retirement, whereupon he passed it on to his children.

In the 1971 Alberta election, Jamison was one of more than forty new Progressive Conservative MLAs elected as Peter Lougheed swept to power. Jamison was re-elected in the 1975 election, but his performance in office had begun to alienate many members of his party. Former St. Albert mayor Ray Gibbon announced his intention to challenge him party's nomination in 1975, and another former mayor, Richard Plain, blamed Jamison for his defeat in 1977, accusing him of using his control of what was then St. Albert's only newspaper to orchestrate a victory for Ronald Harvey, from whom Jamison had bought the paper eleven years previous. Myrna Fyfe defeated Jamison for the nomination in the 1979 election, as Jamison left the Legislature.

Jamison would run unsuccessfully for provincial office twice more in his career: in the 1982 election he ran as an independent, finishing third as Fyfe was re-elected, while in the 1986 election he finished third while running under the banner of the short-lived Representative Party of Alberta. He also ran federally in the riding of Pembina as an independent in a 1986 by-election, finishing fifth of seven candidate with 2.7% of the vote.

In 2001, Jamison was hospitalized with prostate cancer, which later metastasized to his spine. He died in 2003 from a stroke.

Legislative Assembly of Alberta
Preceded by Keith Everitt	MLA St. Albert; 1971-1979	Succeeded by Myrna Fyfe
