= Tom Musgrove =

Canadian politician

Member of the Legislative Assembly of Alberta
- In office 1982–1993
- Preceded by: Fred Mandeville
- Succeeded by: Lyle Oberg
- Constituency: Bow Valley

Personal details
- Born: July 19, 1927
- Died: June 28, 1997 (aged 69)
- Party: Progressive Conservative

Thomas N. Musgrove (July 19, 1927 – June 28, 1997) was a provincial level politician from Alberta, Canada. He served as a member of the Legislative Assembly of Alberta from 1982 to 1993 sitting with the governing Progressive Conservative caucus.

== Political career ==
Musgrove ran for public office in the 1982 Alberta general election. He won the electoral district of Bow Valley picking it up for the Progressive Conservatives and his first term in office. He ran for a second term in the 1986 Alberta general election defeating future Lieutenant Governor and former Member of Parliament Bud Olson. He ran for his third and final term in office in the 1989 Alberta general election defeating two other candidates and winning the lowest plurality of his career. He retired at dissolution of the Alberta Legislature in 1993.
