= Ronald Moore (Alberta politician) =

Canadian politician

Ronald Armor Moore (July 28, 1925 – January 9, 2010) was a provincial level politician and columnist in Alberta, Canada. He served as a member of the Legislative Assembly of Alberta from 1982 to 1993.

== Early life ==
Moore was involved with fund raising efforts to help purchase Lacombes old Catholic Church for the Lacombe Legion to use as their hall in 1950.

== Political career ==
Moore was elected to his first term in the Alberta Legislature in the 1982 Alberta general election. He won the electoral district of Lacombe defeating three other candidates with a landslide to hold the district for the Progressive Conservatives. On August 1, 1984 Moore opened the Legion Sunset Campground with Minister of Recreation and Parks Peter Trynchy.

Moore won re-election in the 1986 Alberta general election. He defeated New Democrat candidate Ken Ling to win the two race in a landslide. He was re-elected to his third term in office in the 1993 Alberta general election winning a reduced but comfortable plurality.

In his final term in office Moore played a critical impact in the 1992 Alberta Progressive Conservative Leadership election. He is most famously known for delivering critical rural support of 35 Members of the Legislative Assembly of Alberta to help Ralph Klein win the Progressive Conservative leadership against Nancy Betkowski. Moore forced Ralph Klein and Rod Love to promote a fiscally conservative platform to renew the party in the face of deficit budgets and free spending scandals brought on by the leadership of former premier Don Getty. He retired from public office at dissolution of the Legislative Assembly in 1993.

== Late life ==
Moore pushed Lacombe Town Council to establish a Veterans Millennium Project. On September 27, 1999 council passed a motion allowing the planting of Colorado blue spruce tree's and a bronze plaque along a major street to honor war dead. The motion passed along with a fundraiser organized by Moore raised $20,000.00 towards funding the project.

Legislative Assembly of Alberta
Preceded by Jack Cookson	MLA Lacombe; 1982–1993	Succeeded by District Abolished
