= Calgary-Millican =

Defunct provincial electoral district in Alberta, Canada

Coordinates: 51.00°N 114.02°W

Alberta electoral district

Defunct provincial electoral district
- Legislature: Legislative Assembly of Alberta
- District created: 1970
- District abolished: 1993
- First contested: 1971
- Last contested: 1989

Calgary-Millican was a provincial electoral district in Calgary, Alberta, Canada, mandated to return a single member to the Legislative Assembly of Alberta using the first past the post method of voting from 1971 to 1993.

== History ==
The Calgary-Millican electoral district was created in the 1970 electoral boundary re-distribution from part of the Calgary-East and Calgary South electoral districts.

The Calgary-Millican electoral district was abolished in the 1993 electoral boundary re-distribution, where the district was split, with the south part of the riding joined Calgary Shaw and the north merged with Calgary-Forest Lawn to re-form Calgary East electoral district.

It was named after the neighbourhood of Millican, in the Ogden community.

Historically this riding covered much of the same boundaries when it was split in 1989 as Calgary-Fort.

=== Members of the Legislative Assembly (MLAs) ===
Members of the Legislative Assembly for Calgary-Millican
Assembly	Years	Member	Party
See Calgary-East electoral district from 1963-1971 and Calgary-South electoral district from 1963-1971
17th	1971–1975	Arthur J. Dixon	Social Credit
18th	1975–1979	Thomas Charles Donnelly	Progressive Conservative
19th	1979–1982	David J. Carter	Progressive Conservative
20th	1982–1986	Gordon Shrake	Progressive Conservative
21st	1986–1989	Gordon Shrake	Progressive Conservative
21st	1986–1989	Gordon Shrake	Progressive Conservative
See Calgary-East electoral district from 1993-Present

== Election results ==
=== 1971 ===
1971 Alberta general election
Party	Candidate	Votes	%	±%
Social Credit	Arthur J. Dixon	4,539	49.29%	–
Progressive Conservative	Norman Kwong	2,973	32.29%	–
New Democratic	Clarence Lacombe	1,543	16.76%	–
Liberal	Carole Walter	153	1.66%	–
Total		9,208	–	–
Rejected, spoiled and declined		104	–	–
Eligible electors / turnout		15,182	61.34%	–
Source(s) Source: "Calgary-Millican Official Results 1971 Alberta general election". Alberta Heritage Community Foundation.

=== 1975 ===
1975 Alberta general election
Party	Candidate	Votes	%	±%
Progressive Conservative	Thomas Charles Donnelly	4,978	57.83%	25.54%
Social Credit	Arthur J. Dixon	2,114	24.56%	-24.74%
New Democratic	Joseph Yanchula	940	10.92%	-5.84%
Liberal	Jodi Mahoney	512	5.95%	4.29%
Communist	Mike Daniels	43	0.50%	–
Independent	Roger Lavoie	21	0.24%	–
Total		8,608	–	–
Rejected, spoiled and declined		41	–	–
Eligible electors / turnout		17,394	49.72%	–
Progressive Conservative gain from Social Credit		Swing		8.13%
Source(s) Source: "Calgary-Millican Official Results 1975 Alberta general election". Alberta Heritage Community Foundation.

=== 1979 ===
1979 Alberta general election
Party	Candidate	Votes	%	±%
Progressive Conservative	David J. Carter	4,034	62.07%	4.24%
Social Credit	Arthur J. Dixon	1,539	23.68%	-0.88%
New Democratic	Stan Johns	595	9.16%	-1.76%
Liberal	Bob Cox	331	5.09%	-0.85%
Total		6,499	–	–
Rejected, spoiled and declined		N/A	–	–
Eligible electors / turnout		14,052	46.25%	–
Progressive Conservative hold		Swing		2.56%
Source(s) Source: "Calgary-Millican Official Results 1979 Alberta general election". Alberta Heritage Community Foundation.

=== 1982 ===
1982 Alberta general election
Party	Candidate	Votes	%	±%
Progressive Conservative	Gordon Shrake	6,323	68.77%	6.69%
New Democratic	Davis Swan	1,626	17.68%	8.53%
Western Canada Concept	Garnet E. Birch	779	8.47%	–
Independent	Zoritza Kasparian	417	4.54%	–
Communist	Doris Schupp	50	0.54%	–
Total		9,195	–	–
Rejected, spoiled and declined		52	–	–
Eligible electors / turnout		15,723	58.81%	–
Progressive Conservative hold		Swing		6.35%
Source(s) Source: "Calgary-Millican Official Results 1982 Alberta general election". Alberta Heritage Community Foundation.

=== 1986 ===
1986 Alberta general election
Party	Candidate	Votes	%	±%
Progressive Conservative	Gordon Shrake	3,204	48.10%	-20.66%
New Democratic	David Davis Swan	2,512	37.71%	20.03%
Liberal	James Jude Smith	588	8.83%	–
Independent	Dave Wereschuk	209	3.14%	-1.40%
Representative	Barry M. Bernard	148	2.22%	–
Total		6,661	–	–
Rejected, spoiled and declined		25	–	–
Eligible electors / turnout		19,377	34.50%	–
Progressive Conservative hold		Swing		-20.35%
Source(s) Source: "Calgary-Millican Official Results 1986 Alberta general election". Alberta Heritage Community Foundation.

=== 1989 ===
1989 Alberta general election
Party	Candidate	Votes	%	±%
Progressive Conservative	Gordon Shrake	3,840	43.05%	-5.05%
New Democratic	Bill Flookes	3,713	41.63%	3.92%
Liberal	Dale Muti	1,366	15.32%	6.49%
Total		8,919	–	–
Rejected, spoiled and declined		26	–	–
Eligible electors / turnout		20,329	44.00%	–
Progressive Conservative hold		Swing		-4.48%
Source(s) Source: "Calgary-Millican Official Results 1989 Alberta general election". Alberta Heritage Community Foundation.

== See also ==
- List of Alberta provincial electoral districts
- Canadian provincial electoral districts
