= William Edward Payne =

Canadian politician (born 1933)

The Honourable William "Bill" Edward Payne ECA

Member of the Legislative Assembly of Alberta
- In office March 14, 1979 – June 15, 1993
- Preceded by: New District
- Succeeded by: Heather Forsyth
- Constituency: Calgary-Fish Creek

Minister without Portfolio
- In office November 1982 – May 1986

Personal details
- Born: July 4, 1933 (age 93) Windsor, Ontario
- Party: Progressive Conservative
- Occupation: politician

William Edward Payne ECA (born July 4, 1933) is a former provincial politician from Alberta, Canada. He served as a member of the Legislative Assembly of Alberta from 1979 to 1993, sitting with the governing Progressive Conservative caucus. Premier Peter Lougheed appointed Payne to the Executive Council of Alberta. He briefly served as a minister without portfolio from 1982 to 1986.

Payne is a member of the Church of Jesus Christ of Latter-day Saints.

== Political career ==
Payne ran as a Progressive Conservative candidate in the 1979 Alberta general election in the electoral district of Calgary-Fish Creek. He won his first term, defeating three other candidates with a landslide majority. Payne ran for a second term in office in the 1982 Alberta general election. He increased his majority, finishing nearly 15,000 votes ahead of second place candidate Byron Chenger of the Western Canada Concept. After the election Payne was appointed minister without portfolio by Premier Peter Lougheed. He held that cabinet portfolio for a single term.

In the 1986 Alberta general election, Payne won his third term with almost 10,000 fewer votes from his 1982 total. He still finished well ahead, winning the district with a third consecutive landslide. He ran for his fourth and final term in the 1989 Alberta general election. His popular vote dropped again as support for Liberal candidate Wayne Gillis surged, finishing approximately 1,500 votes behind Payne. He retired at dissolution of the Assembly in 1993.
