= Gordon Shrake =

Canadian politician (1937–2024)

Gordon Wells Shrake (February 4, 1937 – May 30, 2024) was a Canadian politician who first served as a City of Calgary Alderman from 1971 until 1982, when he was elected as a member of the Legislative Assembly of Alberta, serving from 1982 to 1993.

== Alderman ==
Shrake was first elected to the Calgary city council on October 25, 1971. He served as a municipal councilor until he resigned after winning a seat in the provincial legislature in 1982.

== MLA ==
While still serving as an Alderman for the City of Calgary, Shrake ran as a Progressive Conservative candidate in the 1982 Alberta general election. He won the electoral district of Calgary Millican defeating New Democrat candidate David Swann by a wide margin. He ran for his second term in office in the 1986 Alberta general election. This race proved to be a lot closer for Shrake as his popular vote was cut in half from 1982. Swann ran against him for the second time, doubling his popular vote, but not gaining enough support to win. Shrake would run for a third and final term in the 1989 Alberta general election. He would gain enough popular support to defeat New Democrat candidate Bill Flookes by just over 100 votes. Shrake retired from provincial politics at the dissolution of the Assembly in 1993.

Shrake died on May 30, 2024, at the age of 87.

Legislative Assembly of Alberta
Preceded by David Carter	MLA Calgary Millican; 1982-1993	Succeeded by District Abolished
