= Alan Hyland =

Canadian politician (1945–2024)

Member of the Legislative Assembly of Alberta
- In office March 26, 1975 – June 15, 1993
- Preceded by: Harry Strom
- Succeeded by: Lorne Taylor
- Constituency: Cypress (1975–1986); Cypress-Redcliff (1986–1993)

Personal details
- Born: July 28, 1945 Medicine Hat, Alberta, Canada
- Died: July 24, 2024 (aged 78) Bow Island, Alberta, Canada
- Party: Progressive Conservative Association of Alberta
- Occupation: farmer

Alan William Hyland (July 28, 1945 – July 24, 2024) was a Canadian municipal and provincial-level politician from Alberta. He served as a member of the Legislative Assembly of Alberta from 1975 to 1993.

== Life and career ==
Hyland ran as a candidate for the Progressive Conservatives in the 1975 Alberta general election. He ran in the Cypress electoral district, that was previously held by former Premier Harry Strom. Hyland won the district, picking it up for his party by winning a closely contested election defeating Social Credit candidate Barry Bernhardt and two other candidates. He was re-elected with a larger majority in the 1979 Alberta general election winning well over 50% of the popular vote. Hyland ran for a third term in office in the 1982 Alberta general election. He secured the largest majority of his political career with the only opposition coming from Independent candidate Orville Reber.

The Cypress electoral district was abolished in 1986 due to redistribution. Hyland ran in the new electoral district of Cypress-Redcliff for the 1986 general election and won a close race over Lloyd Robinson running under the Representative Party banner. Robinson and Hyland would face each other again in the 1989 general election. Hyland would defeat Robinson by 600 votes, who increased his popular support running under the Liberal banner. Hyland retired at dissolution of the Assembly in 1993.

After leaving provincial politics, Hyland became mayor of Bow Island, Alberta.

== Death ==
Hyland died on July 24, 2024, at the age of 78, four days before his 79th birthday.

Legislative Assembly of Alberta
Preceded by Harry Strom	Member of the Legislative Assembly for Cypress; 1975–1986	District abolished
Preceded by Harry Strom	Member of the Legislative Assembly for Cypress-Redcliff; 1986–1993	District abolished
