= John Gogo =

Canadian politician

Member of the Legislative Assembly of Alberta
- In office 1975–1993
- Preceded by: Richard Gruenwald
- Succeeded by: Clint Dunford
- Constituency: Lethbridge West

Personal details
- Born: John Albert Gogo; February 15, 1932 Toronto, Ontario, Canada
- Died: April 5, 2015 (aged 83) Lethbridge, Alberta, Canada
- Party: Progressive Conservative Association of Alberta

John Albert Gogo (February 15, 1932 – April 4, 2015) was a Canadian politician. He was a member of the Legislative Assembly of Alberta from 1975 to 1993 and served several years in the provincial cabinet.

Gogo joined the Canadian Armed Forces in 1949 and saw combat in the Korean War. He attained the rank of sergeant by the time he left the Army in 1962. In 1972 he became President of the Rotary Club of Lethbridge.

Gogo ran in the 1975 Alberta general election as a Progressive Conservative candidate in the riding of Lethbridge West; he defeated incumbent Social Credit MLA Richard Gruenwald by a wide margin. He served as Minister of Advanced Education in the provincial government from November 1985 to December 1992.

On May 31, 2007 Gogo was awarded an honorary doctorate degree from the University of Lethbridge. He died in 2015 in Lethbridge.

Legislative Assembly of Alberta
Preceded by Richard Gruenwald	MLA Lethbridge West; 1975-1993	Succeeded by Clint Dunford
