= 1982 Alberta general election =

- November 2, 1982

79 seats in the Legislative Assembly of Alberta 40 seats were needed for a majority
- Turnout: 66.00%
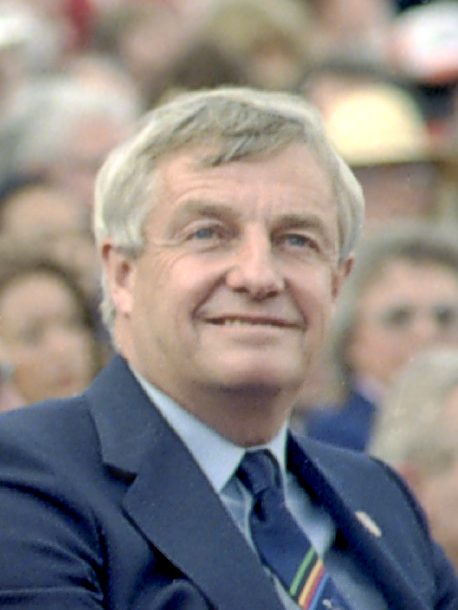

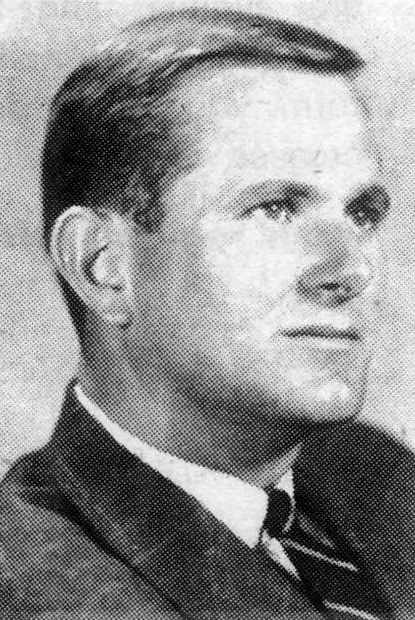
	Majority party	Minority party	Third party
			WCC
Leader	Peter Lougheed	Grant Notley	Gordon Kesler
Party	Progressive Conservative	New Democratic	Western Canada Concept
Leader since	1965	1968	1982
Leader's seat	Calgary-West	Spirit River-Fairview	ran in Highwood (lost)
Last election	74 seats, 57.4%	1 seat, 15.8%	pre-creation
Seats before	73	1	1
Seats won	75	2	0
Seat change	▲2	▲1	▼1
Popular vote	588,485	177,166	111,131
Percentage	62.3%	18.7%	11.8%
Swing	▲4.9%	▲2.9%	—
	Fourth party	Fifth party
	SC	ARM
Leader	George Richardson	Tom Sindlinger
Party	Social Credit	Reform Movement
Leader since	1982	1982
Leader's seat	ran in Whitecourt (lost)	Calgary-Buffalo (lost re-election)
Last election	4 seats, 19.9%	pre-creation
Seats before	1	1
Seats won	0	0
Seat change	▼1	▼1
Popular vote	7,843	6,258
Percentage	0.8%	0.7%
Swing	▼19.1%	—
Premier before election
Peter Lougheed
Progressive Conservative
Premier after election
Peter Lougheed
Progressive Conservative

The 1982 Alberta general election was held on November 2, 1982, to elect members of the Legislative Assembly of Alberta.

== History ==
Less than four years had passed since the Progressive Conservatives won their landslide victory in 1979. Premier Peter Lougheed decided to call a snap election to catch fledgling new parties off guard, most notably the separatist Western Canada Concept which was capitalizing on anger over Lougheed's perceived weakness in dealings with the federal government, in particular his acceptance of the hugely unpopular National Energy Program. The WCC's Gordon Kesler had won a by-election earlier in the year, and Lougheed decided that it would be wise to stage a showdown with the WCC sooner rather than later.

Lougheed then proceeded to mount a campaign based largely on scare tactics, warning Albertans angry with Ottawa but yet uneasy with the WCC that they could end up with a separatist government by voting for a separatist party. Lougheed would also promise to sell the government owned airline Pacific Western Airlines, which the Lougheed government had purchased in 1974. The strategy worked for the Tories, who won their fourth consecutive term in government, and returned to the 62% popular vote level it had attained in the 1975 election. This netted the Tories 75 seats in the legislature—in terms of percentage of seats won, the second-largest majority government in the province's history. In the process, they reduced the opposition to only four MLAs in total.

The Alberta Liberal Party was punished in the wake of the NEP. Barely able to field candidates in a third of the ridings, it went down to one of its worst showings in party history.

The Social Credit Party bottomed out after spending a decade in the wilderness after losing power in 1971. In a harbinger of things to come, Socred leader Robert Curtis Clark returned to the backbench shortly after the 1979 election, and retired from politics in 1981. Clark's old seat of Olds-Didsbury was resoundingly lost to the WCC in the ensuing by-election, dropping the Socreds to only three seats, one short of official party status. In March 1982, Socred parliamentary leader Raymond Speaker announced the Socreds would sit out the election. A resolution was put forward to disband the party, but failed. After the writs were issued for the 1982 election, two of the remaining three Socred MLAs, Speaker and Walt Buck, resigned from the party to run for reelection as independents. The third, Fred Mandeville, opted not to run for reelection. With no incumbents for the first time since 1935 and no full-time leader, Social Credit was only able to run 23 candidates, easily its smallest slate at the time. The party's share of the popular vote fell from almost 20% to less than one per cent. It was shut out of the legislature for the first time since 1935, never to return. Speaker and Buck, however, did win reelection, and later formed the Representative Party of Alberta after being denied opposition status.

The New Democratic Party, led by Grant Notley, became the official opposition when Ray Martin was elected to the legislature. Notley had been the sole NDP MLA for more than a decade.

The WCC, a party that advocated the separation of the four western provinces of Canada to form a new country, had surprised Canadians when Kesler won his by-election and took a seat in the Alberta legislature. Although Kesler lost his seat in this election after he changed electoral districts from Olds-Didsbury and ran in Highwood, the WCC won almost 12% of the popular vote.

The Alberta Reform Movement, a new party founded by ex-Progressive Conservative Tom Sindlinger was caught unaware when the election was called, and ended up losing its only seat in Calgary Buffalo.

== Opinion polls ==
Evolution of voting intentions at provincial level
Polling firm	Last day of survey	Source	PCA	ANDP	WCC	ALP	ASC	Other	Undecided	ME	Sample
Election 1982	November 2, 1982		62.28	18.75	11.76	1.81	0.83				
Alberta Report	September 26, 1982		71	15	7	5	2	—N/a	—N/a	—N/a	2,370
Alberta Report	September 26, 1982		52	17	20	7	3	—N/a	31	—N/a	400
Election 1979	March 14, 1979		57.40	15.75	—	6.16	19.87				

== Results ==
Overall voter turnout was 66.00%.

Party	Party leader	# of candidates	Seats				Popular vote		
Party	Party leader	# of candidates	1979	Diss.	Elected	% Change	#	%	% Change
Progressive Conservative	Peter Lougheed	79	74	73	75	+1.4%	588,485	62.28%	+4.88%
New Democratic	Grant Notley	79	1	1	2	+100%	177,166	18.75%	+3.00%
Independent		34	-	2	2	-	36,590	3.87%	+3.10%
Western Canada Concept	Gordon Kesler	78	*	1	-	*	111,131	11.76%	*
Liberal	Nicholas Taylor	29	-	-	-	-	17,074	1.81%	-4.35%
Social Credit	George Richardson	23	4	1	-	-100%	7,843	0.83%	-19.04%
Alberta Reform Movement	Tom Sindlinger	14	*	1	-	-100%	6,258	0.66%	*
Communist		8	-	-	-	-	389	0.04%	-0.01%
Total		344	79	79	79	-	944,936	100%	
Source: Elections Alberta

Note:

* Party did not nominate candidates in the previous election.

Popular vote
PC	62.28%
New Democratic	18.75%
WCC	11.76%
Liberal	1.81%
Social Credit	0.83%
Others	4.57%

Seats summary
PC	94.94%
New Democratic	2.53%
Independent	2.53%

== Results by riding ==
Electoral district	Candidates					Incumbent
Electoral district	PC	NDP	Western Canada Concept	Liberal	Other	Incumbent
Athabasca	Frank Appleby; 5,342; 56.96%	Ed Caraher; 1,952; 20.81%	Con Sehn; 1,538; 16.40%		Adam Hauch (SoCred); 529; 5.64%	Frank Appleby
Banff-Cochrane	Greg Stevens; 8,369; 72.06%	David Evans; 1,288; 11.09%	Larry Peterson; 1,919; 16.52%			Greg Stevens
Barrhead	Kenneth R. Kowalski; 5,001; 51.37%	Harold E. Wharton; 478; 4.91%	John Thomas Mitchell; 633; 6.50%	Nicholas Taylor; 3,331; 34.22%	Shirley Bassani (SoCred); 240; 2.47% Ernie Charman (ARM); 39; 0.40%	Hugh F. Horner
Bonnyville	Ernie Isley; 4,842; 59.43%	Tom Turner; 2,547; 31.26%	Eric E. Enns; 732; 8.98%			Ernie Isley
Bow Valley	Tom N. Musgrove; 4,541; 60.06%	Bradley Neubauer; 266; 3.52%			Murray Erickson (Ind.); 2,719; 35.96%	Fred T. Mandeville
Calgary-Bow	Neil Webber; 9,412; 70.02%	Catherine Martini; 2,293; 17.06%	Roy P. Rasmusen; 1,059; 7.88%	Floyd Allen; 380; 2.83%	Douglas Stewart Williams (SoCred); 253; 1.88%	Neil Webber
Calgary-Buffalo	Brian Craig Lee; 7,591; 62.01%	Barry Pashak; 1,211; 9.89%	Anita Bozak; 739; 6.04%		Tom Sindlinger (ARM); 2649; 21.64%	Tom Sindlinger
Calgary-Currie	Dennis L. Anderson; 9,701; 75.51%	Glenn Miller; 1,417; 11.03%	Darwin M. Sorenson; 1,018; 7.92%	Rork Hilford; 686; 5.34%		Dennis L. Anderson
Calgary-Egmont	David John Carter; 10,331; 78.18%	Leroy Thompson; 1,128; 8.54%	Richard A. Langen; 1,174; 8.88%	Bernie C. Tanner; 396; 3.00%	Victor Lenko (ARM); 158; 1.20%	Merv Leitch
Calgary-Elbow	David J. Russell; 7,521; 69.64%	Thora Miessner; 1,054; 9.76%	Gregory J. Langen; 829; 7.68%	John S. Webb; 674; 6.24%	Don Carter (Ind.); 520; 4.81% Ray Neilson (SoCred); 172; 1.59%	David J. Russell
Calgary-Fish Creek	William Edward Payne; 17,376; 79.63%	Tom Polmear; 1,501; 6.88%	Byron L. Chenger; 2,252; 10.32%	Alan D.J. Sopczak; 659; 3.02%		William Edward Payne
Calgary-Foothills	Janet Koper; 9,708; 66.92%	Joanne Hedenstrom; 2,249; 15.50%	Robert Moyor; 1,438; 9.91%	Larry Adorjan; 540; 3.72%	Carol Stein (Ind.); 570; 3.93%	Stewart A. McCrae
Calgary-Forest Lawn	John Zaozirny; 9,704; 73.94%	Ken Richmond; 1,478; 11.26%	Henry Hein Braeutigam; 1,244; 9.48%	J.V.W. Gairy; 314; 2.39%	Ella Ayers (SoCred); 294; 2.24% Bruce Potter (Comm); 56; 0.43%	John Zaozirny
Calgary-Glenmore	Hugh L. Planche; 13,835; 77.63%	George Yanchula; 1,532; 8.60%	Brian McClung; 1,864; 10.46%		Barry J. Rust (ARM); 526; 2.95%	Hugh L. Planche
Calgary-McCall	Stanley Kenneth Nelson; 17,493; 76.40%	Dennis Bennett; 2,673; 11.67%	Terry Wolsey; 1,728; 7.55%		Don Bryant (Ind.); 852; 3.72% Grand Tim Majanja (ARM); 120; 0.52%	Andrew Little
Calgary-McKnight	Eric Charles Musgreave; 12,130; 71.54%	Eileen Nesbitt; 2,451; 14.46%	John J. Jasienczyk; 1,332; 7.86%	John J. Gleason; 621; 3.66%	Jerry J. Glowacki (SoCred); 383; 2.26%	Eric Charles Musgreave
Calgary-Millican	Gordon Wells Shrake; 6,323; 68.38%	David Davis Swan; 1,626; 17.58%	Garnet E. Birch; 779; 8.42%		Zoritza Kasparian (Ind.); 417; 4.51% Doris Schupp (Comm); 50; 0.54%	David John Carter
Calgary-Mountain View	Bohdan Zip; 7,187; 57.43%	Phil Elder; 3,372; 26.95%	Stephen B. Keeling; 772; 6.17%	J. Curtis Joynt; 420; 3.36%	Diane Ablonczy (Ind.); 706; 5.64%	Stan Kushner
Calgary-North Hill	Ed Oman; 9,168; 72.50%	Agnes Middleton; 1,753; 13.86%	Gordon Kennard; 968; 7.66%	Dorothy Groves; 701; 5.54%		Ed Oman
Calgary-North West	Sheila Embury; 11,711; 74.85%	Floyd A. Johnson; 1,745; 11.15%	Walter Kostiuk; 1,768; 11.30%		A. Leith McClure (SoCred); 404; 2.58%	Sheila Embury
Calgary-West	Peter Lougheed; 11,668; 78.41%	Ed Smith; 1,175; 7.90%	Bruce Roper; 1,106; 7.43%	Barbara Ann Scott; 598; 4.02%	Leonard Petterson (SoCred); 251; 1.69%	Peter Lougheed
Camrose	Gordon Stromberg; 10,547; 63.53%	Garry Oberg; 3,070; 18.49%	Keith Schmidt; 2,900; 17.47%			Gordon Stromberg
Cardston	John Thompson; 3,738; 59.14%	Leslie N. Howard; 250; 3.96%	Steve Pinchak; 2,309; 36.53%			John Thompson
Chinook	Henry Kroeger; 4,837; 73.54%	Gladys Creasy; 465; 7.07%	Jack Ramsey; 1,266; 19.25%			Henry Kroeger
Clover Bar	Sten Berg; 5,434; 35.67%	David Morris; 1,683; 11.05%	Sig Jorstad; 1,783; 11.71%		Walt A. Buck (Ind.); 6,312; 41.44%	Walt A. Buck
Cypress	Alan Hyland; 4,170; 64.27%	Rudolf Schempp; 637; 9.82%	Gifford Woodcock; 590; 9.09%		Orville Reber (Ind.); 1,080; 16.65%	Alan Hyland
Drayton Valley	Shirley Cripps; 4,906; 66.75%	Lynne Martin; 1,155; 15.71%	George Perdicaris; 1,265; 17.21%			Shirley Cripps
Drumheller	Lewis (Mickey) Clark; 8,148; 68.14%	Gerry Hamilton; 1,124; 9.40%	Vern Hoff; 2,630; 21.99%			Lewis (Mickey) Clark
Edmonton-Avonmore	Horst A. Schmid; 6,606; 52.92%	Kathleen Wright; 4,045; 32.40%	Jake Johnson; 1,275; 10.21%		Leif Oddson (SoCred); 466; 3.73% Rona Drennan (Comm); 40; 0.32%	Horst A. Schmid
Edmonton-Belmont	Walter R. Szwender; 6,579; 54.51%	John Younie; 3,893; 32.25%	Dennis Peter; 986; 8.17%		Elmer Knutson (Ind.); 512; 4.24% Joan Jenkins (Comm); 37; 0.31%	William L. Mack
Edmonton-Beverly	Bill W. Diachuk; 6,894; 50.51%	Winston Gereluk; 5,638; 41.31%	Dexter B. Dombro; 819; 6.00%		Steve Kostiuk (SoCred); 268; 1.96%	Bill W. Diachuk
Edmonton-Calder	Tom Chambers; 8,442; 55.31%	Christie Mjolsness; 5,527; 36.21%	Walter Stack; 1,274; 8.35%			Tom Chambers
Edmonton-Centre	Mary LeMessurier; 5,414; 49.72%	Iain Taylor; 3,578; 32.86%	Larry McIlroy; 812; 7.46%	Brian McKercher; 849; 7.80%	Lawlor J. McKenna (SoCred); 197; 1.81%	Mary LeMessurier
Edmonton-Glengarry	Rollie Cook; 5,997; 58.38%	Garth Stevenson; 3,181; 30.96%	Gordon Reid; 1,037; 10.09%			Rollie Cook
Edmonton-Glenora	Lou Hyndman; 7,724; 61.88%	H.D. (Tony) Smith; 2,555; 20.47%	Fred Marshall; 1,649; 13.21%	Jerry Paschen; 534; 4.28%		Lou Hyndman
Edmonton-Gold Bar	Alois Paul Hiebert; 7,223; 56.65%	Allen Eng; 3,563; 27.94%	Joe Wanner; 996; 7.81%	Laurie Switzer; 567; 4.45%	Chuck Bolton (Ind.); 387; 3.04%	Alois Paul Hiebert
Edmonton-Highlands	David T. King; 5,157; 54.36%	Marilyn Burnett; 3,493; 36.82%	Dave Maetche; 721; 7.60%		Naomi J. Rankin (Comm); 66; 0.70%	David T. King
Edmonton-Jasper Place	Leslie Gordon Young; 6,723; 57.53%	Don Aitken; 3,498; 29.93%	John B. Ludwig; 987; 8.45%		Peter A. Keohan (SoCred); 241; 2.06% G. Crofton (ARM); 179; 1.53%	Leslie Gordon Young
Edmonton-Kingsway	Carl Paproski; 4,294; 41.62%	Alex McEachern; 3,879; 37.59%	Curtis Long; 669; 6.48%	Bill Broad; 318; 3.08%	Mark Byington (Ind.); 950; 9.21% George Klimuk (SoCred); 192; 1.86%	Kenneth R.H. Paproski
Edmonton-Meadowlark	Gerard Joseph Amerongen; 10,817; 58.44%	Robert Henderson; 4,590; 24.80%	Al Wilson; 1,511; 8.16%	Naseer A. Chaudhary; 776; 4.19%	William (Bill) Dickson (Ind.); 423; 2.29% Andy H. Groenink (SoCred); 345; 1.86%	Gerard Joseph Amerongen
Edmonton-Mill Woods	Milt Pahl; 10,095; 55.75%	Gerry Gibeault; 5,159; 28.49%	Dave Fletcher; 1,894; 10.46%	Winston Mohabir; 590; 3.26%	Terry Juba (SoCred); 329; 1.82%	Milt Pahl
Edmonton-Norwood	Tony Falcone; 4,782; 45.25%	Ray Martin; 4,857; 45.96%	John Hudson; 569; 5.38%		George J.P. Wowk (SoCred); 263; 2.49% David Wallis (Comm); 37; 0.35%	Catherine Chichak
Edmonton-Parkallen	Neil S. Crawford; 8,229; 55.30%	Jim Russell; 5,771; 38.78%	Merv Gray; 823; 5.53%		Chris Frazer (Comm); 39; 0.26%	Neil S. Crawford
Edmonton-Sherwood Park	Henry Woo; 8,401; 54.70%	Ted Paszek; 3,462; 22.54%	Al Oeming; 3,029; 19.72%		Al Howell (ARM); 450; 2.93%	Henry Woo
Edmonton-Strathcona	Julian Koziak; 7,105; 47.73%	Gordon S.B. Wright; 6,643; 44.63%	Randy Coombes; 743; 4.99%		Murray W. Scambler (ARM); 279; 1.87% Joe Hill (Comm); 64; 0.43%	Julian Koziak
Edmonton-Whitemud	Keith Alexander; 10,696; 58.98%	Leslie Bella; 4,884; 26.93%	Erika Guidera; 1,209; 6.67%	Philip Lister; 791; 4.36%	Joe Trenchy (Ind.); 291; 1.60% Keith Schultz (SoCred); 241; 1.33%	Peter Knaak
Edson	Ian Reid; 6,003; 56.88%	Eilir Thomas; 3,232; 30.62%	Lynn Lewis; 1,284; 12.17%			Ian Reid
Grande Prairie	Bob Elliott; 9,555; 58.11%	Bernie Desrosiers; 3,280; 19.95%	Jack Smith; 2,249; 13.68%	Colin Nash; 331; 2.01%	Jake Paetkau (Ind.); 504; 3.06% Roy Housworth (SoCred); 494; 3.00%	Elmer Borstad
Highwood	Harry E. Alger; 7,811; 69.89%	William C. McCutcheon; 465; 4.16%	Gordon Kesler; 2,006; 17.95%		Ronald G. Arkes (ARM); 183; 1.64%	George Wolstenholme
Innisfail	Nigel I. Pengelly; 6,684; 70.66%	Lyle B. Bleich; 738; 7.80%	George Conway-Brown; 2,001; 21.15%			Nigel I. Pengelly
Lac La Biche-McMurray	Norman A. Weiss; 6,844; 56.74%	Dermond Travis; 3,481; 28.86%	Jim Williams; 1,021; 8.46%	Roland J. Woodward; 584; 4.84%		Norman A. Weiss
Lacombe	Ron A. Moore; 5,141; 61.12%	Glen R. Nelson; 1,108; 13.17%	Terry Long; 1,339; 15.92%		Howard P. Thompson (Ind.); 811; 9.64%	John William Cookson
Lesser Slave Lake	Larry R. Shaben; 3,150; 57.48%	Gary D. Kennedy; 914; 16.68%	Garth Lodge; 607; 11.08%	Joseph D. Blyan; 466; 8.50%	George Keay (Ind.); 316; 5.77%	Larry R. Shaben
Lethbridge-East	Archibald Dick Johnston; 8,716; 69.57%	Ed McRae; 1,369; 10.93%	Mike Bennison; 1,054; 8.41%	John I. Boras; 962; 7.68%	Paul R. Belanger (ARM); 400; 3.19%	Archibald Dick Johnston
Lethbridge-West	John Gogo; 8,302; 69.37%	Ian Whishaw; 1,844; 15.41%	G.M. Genstad; 938; 7.84%		Jerry Waldern (SoCred); 480; 4.01% Brenda L. Perkins (ARM); 377; 3.15%	John Gogo
Little Bow	Cliff Wright; 2,144; 33.75%	Beth Jantzie; 168; 2.64%	Wayne Lawlor; 851; 13.40%		Raymond Albert Speaker (Ind.); 3,174; 49.97%	Raymond Albert Speaker
Lloydminster	James Edgar Miller; 5,581; 71.86%	Robin Allan; 905; 11.65%	Jerry Butz; 1,249; 16.08%			James Edgar Miller
Macleod	LeRoy Fjordbotten; 6,136; 71.34%	Paul Abilgaard; 546; 6.35%	Ellis Oviatt; 1,293; 15.03%	Inez Watmough; 144; 1.67%		LeRoy Fjordbotten
Medicine Hat	James Horsman; 14,654; 81.20%	Clarence W. Smith; 2,072; 11.48%	David F. Lees; 996; 5.52%		Frank F. Cottingham (Ind.); 286; 1.58%	James Horsman
Olds-Didsbury	Stephen Stiles; 5,096; 46.91%	Roy Agnew; 233; 2.14%	Daryl M. Jaddock; 2,714; 24.98%			Gordon Kesler
Peace River	Al (Boomer) Adair; 4,688; 56.14%	Richard Collins; 1,541; 18.46%	J.A. Jim Kalman; 1,657; 19.84%	Laura M. Deedza; 211; 2.53%	Joseph (Little Joe) Kessler (Ind.); 225; 2.69%	Al (Boomer) Adair
Pincher Creek-Crowsnest	Frederick Deryl Bradley; 4,388; 64.52%	Mike Cooper; 1,636; 24.06%	Dennis Olson; 650; 9.56%	Jerry Potts; 109; 1.60%		Frederick Deryl Bradley
Ponoka	Halvar C. Jonson; 4,031; 50.65%	C.W. (Bill) Loov; 876; 11.01%	Tom Butterfield; 2,646; 33.25%		Paul M. Bateman (ARM); 235; 2.95% Eric Ostergaard (Ind.); 154; 1.94%	Donald J. McCrimmon
Red Deer	Jim McPherson; 10,659; 54.70%	Kendall Dunford; 1,915; 9.83%	Wynne Richard Hanson; 1,468; 7.53%		Bob Mills (Ind.); 5,396; 27.69%	Norman F. Magee
Redwater-Andrew	George Topolnisky; 4,438; 50.98%	Steve Leskiw; 2,507; 28.80%	Roger P. Pullishy; 1,121; 12.88%	Lawrence D. McCallum; 157; 1.80%	Michael Senych (Ind.); 467; 5.36%	George Topolnisky
Rocky Mountain House	John Murray Campbell; 6,443; 65.99%	Dolly Martin; 1,191; 12.20%	Art Carritt; 2,116; 21.67%			John Murray Campbell
Smoky River	Marvin Moore; 3,950; 57.79%	Anne Hemmingway; 1,537; 22.49%	Andrew Blum; 1,316; 19.25%			Marvin Moore
Spirit River-Fairview	Doug Snider; 3,260; 41.61%	Grant W. Notley; 3,443; 43.95%	Dan Fletcher; 1,093; 13.95%			Grant W. Notley
St. Albert	Myrna Fyfe; 12,982; 54.60%	Kurt Hoeberg; 4,438; 18.67%	Murray Sillito; 2,465; 10.37%		William Ernest Jamison (Ind.); 3,406; 14.33% L.D. Callfas (SoCred); 434; 1.83%	Myrna Fyfe
St. Paul	John Drobot; 4,269; 55.97%	Laurent (Jeff) Dubois; 2,872; 37.66%	Iris Bourne; 447; 5.86%			Charles E. Anderson
Stettler	Graham L. Harle; 4,915; 71.40%	Fred J. Rappel; 617; 8.96%	Doug Carmichael; 1,334; 19.38%			Graham L. Harle
Stony Plain	William Frederick Purdy; 10,210; 59.73%	Jim Bell; 2,905; 16.99%	John G. Parkes; 2,337; 13.67%		Ralph Eikeland (SoCred); 299; 1.75% Murray Fuhr (ARM); 202; 1.18%	William Frederick Purdy
Taber-Warner	Robert Bogle; 6,800; 70.97%	Catherine R. McCreary; 486; 5.07%	Ronald Johnson; 1,811; 18.90%		Emil D. Gundlock (ARM); 461; 4.81%	Robert Bogle
Three Hills	Connie Osterman; 8,693; 77.47%	James B. Schleppe; 549; 4.89%	Vern Meek; 1,949; 17.37%			Connie Osterman
Vegreville	John S. Batiuk; 4,526; 53.51%	Bob Sarafinchan; 2,418; 28.59%	Loren Yasinski; 807; 9.54%		Barry M. Bernard (Ind.); 202; 2.39%Robert E. Robert (SoCred); 487; 5.76%	John S. Batiuk
Vermilion-Viking	Tom Lysons; 4,357; 58.20%	Grant Bergman; 1,205; 16.10%	Richard Van Ee; 1,742; 23.27%		Patrick A. Moore (SoCred); 159; 2.12%	Tom Lysons
Wainwright	Robert A. (Butch) Fischer; 4,589; 61.68%	John Wesley Connelly; 476; 6.40%	Bill Veitch; 2,145; 28.83%	Joseph A. Vermette; 218; 2.93%		Charles Stewart
Wetaskiwin-Leduc	Donald H. Sparrow; 12,923; 63.76%	Earl R. Rasmuson; 3,190; 15.74%	Bill Hosford; 3,511; 17.32%		Barry Cook (Ind.); 576; 2.84%	Dallas Schmidt
Whitecourt	Peter Trynchy; 4,635; 51.46%	Richard Davies; 1,220; 13.55%	Andy Lee; 2,276; 25.27%	John M. Powers; 147; 1.63%	George L. Richardson (SoCred); 685; 7.61%	Peter Trynchy

== See also ==
- List of Alberta political parties
