= 1989 Alberta general election =

- March 20, 1989

83 seats in the Legislative Assembly of Alberta 42 seats needed for a majority
- Turnout: 53.60%
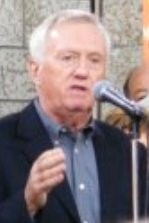

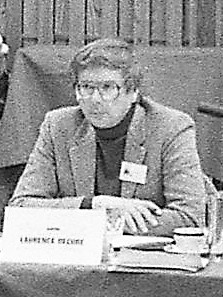
	Majority party	Minority party	Third party
Leader	Don Getty	Ray Martin	Laurence Decore
Party	Progressive Conservative	New Democratic	Liberal
Leader since	November 1, 1985	November 10, 1984	October 9, 1988
Leader's seat	Edmonton-Whitemud (lost re-election)	Edmonton-Norwood	Edmonton-Glengarry
Last election	61 seats, 51.4%	16 seats, 29.2%	4 seats, 12.2%
Seats before	61	16	4
Seats won	59	16	8
Seat change	▼2	±0	▲4
Popular vote	367,244	217,972	237,787
Percentage	44.3%	26.3%	28.7%
Swing	▼7.1%	▼2.9%	▲16.5%
Premier before election
Don Getty
Progressive Conservative
Premier after election
Don Getty
Progressive Conservative

The 1989 Alberta general election was held on March 20, 1989, to elect members of the Legislative Assembly of Alberta.

Many political observers were surprised by the early election call as less than three years had passed since the previous election. Premier Don Getty, in his second election as Progressive Conservative Party leader, led it to its sixth consecutive term in government, although supported by less than half the votes cast in the election.

Despite losing a significant share of the popular vote, the PC's benefited from a split vote between the two main opponents Liberals and NDP. Together those two parties received 55 per cent of the vote to the Conservative's 44 per cent.

The Conservatives sustained a net loss of only two seats in the legislature. Most notably, the premier lost his own seat of Edmonton-Whitemud to Liberal candidate Percy Wickman, the first time that this had happened to a sitting Premier of Alberta since Richard G. Reid in 1935, which had seen the ruling United Farmers of Alberta completely swept from the legislature. The PC's were reduced to just two seats in Edmonton, however despite their losses in urban areas they remained largely dominant in Calgary while their losses were somewhat offset by gains in rural areas, notably at the expense of the moribund Representative Party. Getty himself would quickly return to the Legislature by winning a by-election in a safe rural seat.

The New Democratic Party led by Ray Martin largely held its share of the popular vote, with its gains being balanced by its losses and the party left with the same number of seats (16) as in the previous in the legislature.

The Liberal Party, under new leader Laurence Decore, was the principal beneficiary of the voters' continuing distrust of Don Getty. The Liberals' share of the popular vote increased to over 28%, more than the NDP, but whereas the NDP continued to dominate in Edmonton the Liberal vote was more evenly distributed and the party's legislative caucus increased from four to only eight members.

The Representative Party, which had elected 2 candidates in the previous election, did not run any candidates in 1989 (although it remained registered). Leader Ray Speaker defected to the Progressive Conservatives, while Walt Buck retired. The party disbanded soon after the election.

== Results ==
Overall voter turnout was 53.60%.

Party	Party leader	# of candidates	Seats			Popular vote		
Party	Party leader	# of candidates	1986	Elected	% Change	#	%	% Change
Progressive Conservative	Don Getty	83	61	59	-3.3%	367,244	44.29%	-7.11%
New Democrats	Ray Martin	83	16	16	-	217,952	26.29%	-2.93%
Liberal	Laurence Decore	83	4	8	+100%	237,787	28.68%	+16.46%
Social Credit	Harvey Yuill	6	*	-	*	3,939	0.47%	*
Independent		10	-	-	-	2,162	0.26%	-0.60%
Communist	Norman Brudy	2	-	-	-	85	0.01%	-0.02%
Representative		0	2	-	-100%	0	0.00%	-
Total		267	83	83	-	829,189	100%	
Source: Elections Alberta

Note:

* Party did not nominate candidates in the previous election.

Popular vote
PC	44.29%
Liberal	28.68%
New Democratic	26.29%
Social Credit	0.47%
Others	0.27%

Seats summary
PC	71.08%
New Democratic	19.28%
Liberal	9.64%

== Results by riding ==
Electoral district	Candidates				Incumbent
Electoral district	PC	NDP	Liberal	Other	Incumbent
Athabasca-Lac La Biche	Mike Cardinal; 4,237; 45.07%	Leo Piquette; 3,342; 35.55%	Tom Maccagno; 1,791; 19.05%		Leo Piquette
Banff-Cochrane	Brian Evans; 4,389; 50.82%	Steven Scott; 1,802; 20.86%	Jim N. Tanner; 2,411; 27.91%		Greg Stevens
Barrhead	Kenneth R. Kowalski; 5,294; 57.41%	Harold E. Wharton; 1,673; 18.14%	Dave Perrin; 1,660; 18.00%	J. Harvey Yuill (SoCred); 578; 6.27%	Kenneth R. Kowalski
Bonnyville	Ernie Isley; 3,362; 50.20%	Lori Hall; 1,553; 23.19%	Denis Lapierre; 1,769; 26.41%		Ernie Isley
Bow Valley	Tom N. Musgrove; 3,405; 60.33%	Larry D. Kern; 666; 11.80%	George Timko; 1,561; 27.66%		Tom N. Musgrove
Calgary-Bow	Bonnie Laing; 3,968; 34.76%	Scott Jeffrey; 3,513; 30.77%	Timothy Walter Bardsley; 3,892; 34.09%		Neil Webber
Calgary-Buffalo	Kate Thrasher; 3,601; 31.25%	Iain Dunbar; 877; 7.61%	Sheldon Chumir; 7,014; 60.86%		Sheldon Chumir
Calgary-Currie	Dennis L. Anderson; 5,072; 49.45%	Bruce McGuigan; 1,716; 16.73%	Mairi Matheson; 3,434; 33.48%		Dennis L. Anderson
Calgary-Egmont	David John Carter; 5,272; 52.35%	Vinay Dey; 1,864; 18.51%	Clive R. Mallory; 2,907; 28.87%		David John Carter
Calgary-Elbow	Ralph Klein; 4,505; 49.52%	David Jones; 719; 7.90%	Gilbert J. Clark; 3,682; 40.47%	Larry R Heather (Ind.); 174; 1.91%	David J. Russell
Calgary-Fish Creek	William Edward Payne; 6,996; 47.86%	Tom Polmear; 2,071; 14.17%	Wayne Gillis; 5,517; 37.74%		William Edward Payne
Calgary-Foothills	Patricia Black; 5,341; 37.13%	Theresa Catherine Baxter; 4,133; 28.74%	Harvey Locke; 4,866; 33.83%		Janet Koper
Calgary-Forest Lawn	Moe Amiri; 3,177; 35.01%	Barry Pashak; 3,994; 44.02%	Gene Czaprowski; 1,584; 17.46%	Jim Othen (Ind.); 294; 3.24%	Barry Pashak
Calgary-Glenmore	Dianne Mirosh; 5,189; 45.39%	Barry Bristman; 1,197; 10.47%	Brendan Dunphy; 4,587; 40.12%	Greg Pearson (Ind.); 437; 3.82%	Dianne Mirosh
Calgary-McCall	Stanley Kenneth Nelson; 5,109; 44.53%	Ken Richmond; 3,311; 28.86%	A. Giga; 3,032; 26.42%		Stanley Kenneth Nelson
Calgary-McKnight	Mark Petros; 4,704; 37.91%	Roy Brown; 2,371; 19.11%	Yolande Gagnon; 5,303; 42.74%		Eric Charles Musgreave
Calgary-Millican	Gordon Wells Shrake; 3,840; 42.93%	Bill Flookes; 3,713; 41.51%	Dale Muti; 1,366; 15.27%		Gordon Wells Shrake
Calgary-Montrose	Rick Orman; 5,044; 54.49%	Frank Gereau; 2,585; 27.92%	Jamil Farhat; 1,605; 17.34%		Rick Orman
Calgary-Mountain View	Vicky Adamson; 4,171; 33.22%	Robert Andrew Hawkesworth; 6,469; 51.53%	Kevin Murphy; 1,862; 14.83%		Robert Andrew Hawkesworth
Calgary-North Hill	Frederick Alan Stewart; 4,918; 44.59%	Emily Drzymala; 2,720; 24.66%	Pauline Kay; 3,030; 27.47%	John J. Jasienczyk (Ind.); 328; 2.97%	Frederick Alan Stewart
Calgary-North West	Stan Cassin; 6,985; 41.80%	Kelly Hegg; 2,281; 13.65%	Frank Bruseker; 7,417; 44.38%		Stan Cassin
Calgary-Shaw	Jim Dinning; 7,412; 52.81%	Gordon M. Christie; 1,728; 12.31%	Robert J. (Bob) Crump; 4,865; 34.67%		Jim Dinning
Calgary-West	Elaine McCoy; 6,133; 46.12%	Joseph Yanchula; 2,564; 19.28%	Bernie Myers; 4,550; 34.22%		Elaine McCoy
Camrose	Ken Rostad; 6,494; 63.16%	Bill Scotten; 2,141; 20.82%	Carol Ayers; 1,605; 15.61%		Ken Rostad
Cardston	Jack Ady; 3,483; 74.42%	Don Ferguson; 517; 11.05%	Beth Wendorff; 667; 14.25%		Jack Ady
Chinook	Shirley McClellan; 3,585; 70.98%	H. James Powers; 765; 15.15%	Mel H. Buffalo; 691; 13.68%		Henry Kroeger
Clover Bar	Kurt Gesell; 3,717; 34.53%	W.H. (Skip) Gordon; 3,505; 32.56%	Stephen Lindop; 3,533; 32.82%		Walt A. Buck
Cypress-Redcliff	Alan Hyland; 2,514; 48.87%	Rudolf Schempp; 659; 12.81%	Lloyd B. Robinson; 1,968; 38.26%		Alan Hyland
Drayton Valley	Tom Thurber; 4,563; 45.48%	Lynne Martin; 2,622; 26.13%	G. (Bear) Werschler; 2,826; 28.17%		Shirley Cripps
Drumheller	Stan Schumacher; 5,049; 59.07%	Sid Holt; 1,658; 19.40%	Roger Nelson; 1,800; 21.06%		Stan Schumacher
Dunvegan	Glen Clegg; 4,049; 56.12%	Jim Gurnett; 2,603; 36.08%	R. Gerald Eherer; 550; 7.62%		Glen Clegg
Edmonton-Avonmore	James Albers; 3,831; 30.17%	Marie Laing; 5,290; 41.66%	Don Massey; 3,562; 28.05%		Marie Laing
Edmonton-Belmont	Walter R. Szwender; 3,093; 23.65%	Thomas Sigurdson; 5,319; 40.67%	Cathy Greco; 4,644; 35.51%		Thomas Sigurdson
Edmonton-Beverly	Gary Kump; 3,835; 29.57%	Ed W. Ewasiuk; 6,408; 49.41%	Daryl Robb; 2,520; 19.43%	Bonny Royce (Ind.); 188; 1.45%	Ed W. Ewasiuk
Edmonton-Calder	Aldo De Luca; 2,709; 21.66%	Christie Mjolsness; 5,338; 42.69%	Lance D. White; 4,435; 35.47%		Christie Mjolsness
Edmonton-Centre	Don Clarke; 3,217; 30.29%	William Roberts; 4,440; 41.80%	Mary Molloy; 2,821; 26.56%		William Roberts
Edmonton-Glengarry	John Belzerowski; 3,759; 24.72%	John Younie; 3,974; 26.14%	Laurence Decore; 7,401; 48.67%	Robin Boodle (Comm.); 30; 0.20%	John Younie
Edmonton-Glenora	Nancy Betkowski; 5,128; 47.50%	George Millar; 2,709; 25.09%	Hal Annett; 2,935; 27.19%		Nancy Betkowski
Edmonton-Gold Bar	Cathy Wyatt; 4,381; 30.29%	Chris Tomaschuk; 2,170; 15.00%	Bettie Hewes; 7,833; 54.16%	Naomi Rankin (Comm.); 55; 0.38%	Bettie Hewes
Edmonton-Highlands	Ziad N. Jaber; 2,415; 27.28%	Pam Barrett; 4,997; 56.44%	Ken Kozak; 1,673; 18.90%		Pam Barrett
Edmonton-Jasper Place	Leslie Gordon Young; 4,503; 31.64%	John McInnis; 4,966; 34.90%	Karen Leibovici; 4,747; 33.36%		Leslie Gordon Young
Edmonton-Kingsway	Allen Wasnea; 2,818; 28.92%	Alex McEachern; 4,314; 44.28%	Joan Cowling; 2,585; 26.53%		Alex McEachern
Edmonton-Meadowlark	Joan Majeski; 4,421; 31.24%	William A. (Bill) Mullen; 1,829; 12.92%	Grant Mitchell; 7,877; 55.66%		Grant Mitchell
Edmonton-Mill Woods	Bas Roopnarine; 3,475; 24.73%	Gerry Gibeault; 5,824; 41.44%	Murray W. Scambler; 4,729; 33.65%		Gerry Gibeault
Edmonton-Norwood	Dan Papirnik; 1,519; 20.64%	Ray Martin; 4,229; 57.47%	Luis C. Baptista; 1,594; 21.66%		Ray Martin
Edmonton-Parkallen	Doug Main; 6,169; 40.06%	Jim Selby; 4,979; 32.33%	Nadene Thomas; 4,203; 27.29%		Neil S. Crawford
Edmonton-Strathcona	Jack Scott; 3,724; 28.86%	Gordon S.B. Wright; 6,696; 51.89%	Philip Lister; 2,437; 18.88%		Gordon S.B. Wright
Edmonton-Whitemud	Donald Ross Getty; 8,005; 43.28%	Nao Fernando; 2,099; 11.35%	Percy Wickman; 8,350; 45.14%		Donald Ross Getty
Fort McMurray	Norman A. Weiss; 4,245; 49.30%	Ann Dort-Maclean; 2,740; 31.82%	James Carbery; 1,606; 18.65%		Norman A. Weiss
Grande Prairie	Bob Elliott; 5,319; 52.52%	Evelyn Vardalas; 2,696; 26.62%	Irv Macklin; 1,611; 15.91%	Murray Gauvreau (SoCred); 482; 4.76%	Bob Elliott
Highwood	Don Tannas; 5,481; 60.00%	Janis Belgum; 1,591; 17.42%	Don Dearle; 2,024; 22.16%		Harry E. Alger
Innisfail	Gary Severtson; 4,169; 57.38%	Larry Whaley; 1,294; 17.81%	Bruce A. Jackson; 1,761; 24.24%		Nigel I. Pengelly
Lacombe	Ron A. Moore; 4,014; 59.71%	Cliff Reid; 1,217; 18.10%	Roger Young; 1,467; 21.82%		Ron A. Moore
Lesser Slave Lake	Pearl M. Calahasen; 3,249; 47.51%	Philip G.S. Lukken; 1,294; 18.92%	Denise C. Wahlstrom; 2,286; 33.43%		Larry R. Shaben
Lethbridge-East	Archibald Dick Johnston; 4,993; 49.17%	Sylvia A. Campbell; 2,170; 21.37%	John I. Boras; 2,973; 29.28%		Archibald Dick Johnston
Lethbridge-West	John Gogo; 4,741; 45.33%	Joyce Green; 2,483; 23.74%	Rhonda Ruston; 3,210; 30.69%		John Gogo
Little Bow	Raymond Albert Speaker; 3,907; 79.43%	Keith Ford; 426; 8.66%	Elzien Schopman; 579; 11.77%		Raymond Albert Speaker
Lloydminster	Doug Cherry; 3,584; 66.75%	Gordon E. Swaters; 849; 15.81%	Steve McLachlin; 923; 17.19%		Doug Cherry
Macleod	LeRoy Fjordbotten; 4,459; 67.20%	Mike Dawson; 1,292; 19.47%	Darrell Piehl; 856; 12.90%		LeRoy Fjordbotten
Medicine Hat	James Horsman; 6,465; 40.88%	Wally Regehr; 4,088; 25.85%	Garth Vallely; 5,213; 32.96%		James Horsman
Olds-Didsbury	Roy Brassard; 4,960; 60.01%	Tom Monto; 842; 10.19%	Garfield Marks; 1,182; 14.30%	Ray Young (SoCred); 1249; 15.11%	Roy Brassard
Peace River	Al (Boomer) Adair; 3,749; 57.62%	Adele Gale Boucher; 1,613; 24.79%	Erich Wahl; 1,127; 17.32%		Al (Boomer) Adair
Pincher Creek-Crowsnest	Frederick Deryl Bradley; 3,262; 52.56%	Mike Cooper; 2,119; 34.14%	Stan Stoklosa; 811; 13.07%		Frederick Deryl Bradley
Ponoka-Rimbey	Halvar C. Jonson; 3,729; 59.81%	Doug Hart; 1,667; 26.74%	Ervan Stobbe; 808; 12.96%		Halvar C. Jonson
Red Deer-North	Stockwell Day; 3,652; 48.10%	Gerry Clayton; 1,427; 18.80%	Bernie Fritze; 2,260; 29.77%	Cory Lanterman (Ind.); 231; 3.04%	Stockwell Day
Red Deer-South	John Oldring; 4,637; 49.39%	Linda Ross; 1,840; 19.60%	Roxanne V. Prior; 2,874; 30.61%		John Oldring
Redwater-Andrew	Steve Zarusky; 4,366; 52.83%	Chris Ewasiuk; 2,359; 28.55%	Dennis Holowaychuk; 1,525; 18.45%		Steve Zarusky
Rocky Mountain House	Ty Lund; 4,392; 59.59%	Dolly (Martin) Brown; 1,727; 23.43%	Bob Paston; 1,224; 16.61%		John Murray Campbell
Sherwood Park	Peter Elzinga; 6,462; 46.60%	Ted Paszek; 3,088; 22.27%	John Convey; 4,299; 31.00%		Peter Elzinga
Smoky River	Walter Paszkowski; 3,575; 50.82%	Bill Termeer; 1,721; 24.47%	Duane Dutka; 1,398; 19.87%	Roy Housworth (SoCred); 332; 4.72%	Marvin Moore
St. Albert	Dick Fowler; 6,590; 45.20%	Cheryl Wharton; 3,552; 24.36%	Len Bracko; 4,278; 29.34%	Archie Baldwin (Ind.); 147; 1.01%	Bryan Strong
St. Paul	John Drobot; 2,931; 45.95%	Victor Chrapko; 1,124; 17.62%	Paul Langevin; 2,304; 36.12%		John Drobot
Stettler	Brian C. Downey; 3,875; 57.75%	Fred J. Rappel; 1,089; 16.23%	Frank Pickering; 1,731; 25.80%		Brian C. Downey
Stony Plain	Jim Heron; 4,604; 36.54%	Stan Woloshyn; 4,699; 37.29%	Dan Fitze; 2,732; 21.68%	John Torringa (SoCred); 557; 4.42%	Jim Heron
Taber-Warner	Robert Bogle; 4,932; 73.44%	Charlene Vickers; 782; 11.64%	Patrick (Pat) Flanagan; 981; 14.61%		Robert Bogle
Three Hills	Connie Osterman; 4,986; 56.45%	Fred Mertz; 1,851; 20.96%	Peter Burch; 1,245; 14.10%	Poul Wesch (SoCred); 741; 8.39%	Connie Osterman
Vegreville	Gordon Miller; 3,806; 41.61%	Derek Fox; 4,865; 53.19%	Frederick G. Paasche; 448; 4.90%		Derek Fox
Vermilion-Viking	Steve West; 4,086; 63.44%	Grant Bergman; 1,078; 16.74%	Greg Michaud; 1,252; 19.44%		Steve West
Wainwright	Robert A. (Butch) Fischer; 4,009; 67.54%	Willy Kelch; 1,182; 19.91%	Joseph A. Vermette; 726; 12.23%		Robert A. (Butch) Fischer
West Yellowhead	Ian Reid; 3,109; 36.72%	Jerry J. Doyle; 3,989; 47.12%	Sharron Johnstone; 1,103; 13.03%	Harvey Ball (Ind.); 240; 2.83%	Ian Reid
Westlock-Sturgeon	Leo Seguin; 4,958; 41.08%	Tom Turner; 1,696; 14.05%	Nicholas Taylor; 5,401; 44.75%		Nicholas Taylor
Wetaskiwin-Leduc	Donald H. Sparrow; 5,761; 46.59%	Bruce Hinkley; 3,133; 25.34%	George Carrier; 3,446; 27.87%		Donald H. Sparrow
Whitecourt	Peter Trynchy; 3,877; 49.72%	Gwen E. Symington; 1,456; 18.67%	Jurgen Preugschas; 2,432; 31.19%		Peter Trynchy

== See also ==
- List of Alberta political parties
