= 1979 Alberta general election =

- March 14, 1979

79 seats in the Legislative Assembly of Alberta 40 seats were needed for a majority
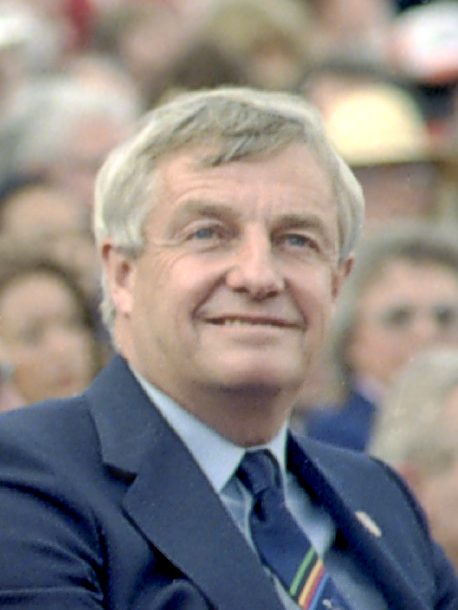

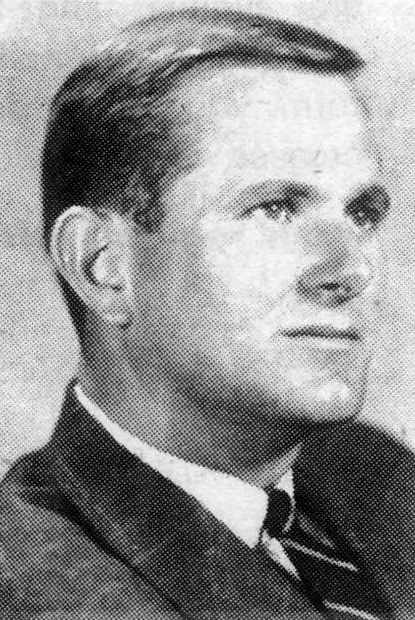
	Majority party	Minority party
		SC
Leader	Peter Lougheed	Robert C. Clark
Party	Progressive Conservative	Social Credit
Leader since	1965	1975
Leader's seat	Calgary-West	Olds-Didsbury
Last election	69 seats, 62.7%	4 seats, 18.2%
Seats before	69	4
Seats won	74	4
Seat change	▲5	±0
Popular vote	408,097	141,284
Percentage	57.4%	19.87%
Swing	▼5.25%	▲1.7%
	Third party	Fourth party
		LIB
Leader	Grant Notley	Nicholas Taylor
Party	New Democratic	Liberal
Leader since	1968	1974
Leader's seat	Spirit River-Fairview	ran in Calgary-Glenmore (lost)
Last election	1 seat, 12.9%	0 seats, 4.98%
Seats before	1	0
Seats won	1	0
Seat change	±0	±0
Popular vote	111,984	43,792
Percentage	15.75%	6.16%
Swing	▲2.81%	▲1.18%
Premier before election
Peter Lougheed
Progressive Conservative
Premier after election
Peter Lougheed
Progressive Conservative

The 1979 Alberta general election was held on March 14, 1979, to elect members of the Legislative Assembly of Alberta, which had been expanded to 79 seats.

The Progressive Conservative Party of Peter Lougheed won its third consecutive term in government. During the campaign, some Progressive Conservatives spoke of winning "79 in '79", i.e., all 79 seats in the legislature. This harkened back to Social Credit's unofficial slogan from the 1963 election, "63 in '63". The Tories came up short of this goal, and actually lost over five percentage points of the popular vote. Nonetheless, they still won an overwhelming majority, with 74 seats.

Social Credit held on to the four seats they had won in the 1975 election, and formed the official opposition in the legislature. Grant Notley, leader of the Alberta New Democratic Party, was the only other opposition member.

== Results ==

Party	Party leader	# of candidates	Seats			Popular Vote		
Party	Party leader	# of candidates	1975	Elected	% Change	#	%	% Change
Progressive Conservative	Peter Lougheed	79	69	74	+7.2%	408,097	57.40%	-5.25%
Social Credit	Robert Curtis Clark	79	4	4	-	141,284	19.87%	+1.70%
New Democrats	Grant Notley	79	1	1	-	111,984	15.75%	+2.81%
Liberal	Nicholas Taylor	78	-	-	-	43,792	6.16%	+1.18%
Independent		8	-	-	-	3,430	0.48%	+0.37%
Independent Conservative		3	-	-	-	1,613	0.23%	+0.05%^{1}
Independent Christian		1	*	-	*	403	0.06%	*
Communist		7	-	-	-	357	0.05%	-0.08%
Total		334	75	79	+5.3%	710,963	100%	
Source: Elections Alberta

Notes:
^{1} Percent compared to Independent Progressive Conservative during the 1975 Election.

^{*} Party did not nominate candidates in the previous election.

Popular vote
PC	57.40%
Social Credit	19.87%
New Democratic	15.75%
Liberal	6.16%
Others	0.82%

Seats summary
PC	93.67%
Social Credit	5.06%
New Democratic	1.27%

== Results by riding ==
Electoral district	Candidates					Incumbent
Electoral district	PC	Social Credit	NDP	Liberal	Other	Incumbent
Athabasca	Frank Appleby; 4,153; 55.39%	Ernest W. Maser; 989; 13.19%	Peter E. Opryshko; 1,792; 23.90%	Robert Blain Logan; 554; 7.39%		Frank Appleby
Banff-Cochrane	Greg Stevens; 5,578; 66.79%	Thomas McArthur; 1,462; 17.51%	Bob Ritchie; 759; 9.09%	Morna F. Schechtel; 543; 6.50%		
Barrhead	Hugh F. Horner; 4,629; 61.73%	David Bouyea; 1,658; 22.11%	Lionel Udenberg; 1,008; 13.44%	John V. Murphy; 136; 1.81%		Hugh F. Horner
Bonnyville	Ernie Isley; 3,468; 49.57%	George Nordstrom; 1,275; 18.22%	Tom Turner; 1,828; 26.13%	Edward Stepanik; 194; 2.77%	Donald Appleby (Ind.); 206; 2.94%	Donald Hansen
Bow Valley	Paul Bartlett; 2,484; 35.92%	Fred T. Mandeville; 4,123; 59.62%	Ron Wickson; 201; 2.91%	Brian Nearing; 86; 1.24%		Fred T. Mandeville
Calgary-Bow	Neil Webber; 7,042; 64.39%	Jim Beale; 1,816; 16.61%	Floyd A. Johnson; 1,361; 12.45%	Clive Scott; 633; 5.79%	Adela Polancec (Comm.); 47; 0.43%	Neil Webber
Calgary-Buffalo	Tom Sindlinger; 6,481; 63.78%	Jim Rocker; 1,432; 14.09%	Brian Rees; 1,052; 10.35%	Lloyd Hamilton; 1,096; 10.79%	David Willis (Comm.); 62; 0.61%	Ronald H. Ghitter
Calgary-Currie	Dennis L. Anderson; 6,885; 59.57%	Charles S. Dunkley; 2,822; 24.42%	Glenn Miller; 1,042; 9.02%	Jerry Arshinoff; 789; 6.83%		Fred H. Peacock
Calgary-Egmont	Merv Leitch; 8,083; 73.30%	Albert Downton; 1,245; 11.29%	Muriel McCreary; 844; 7.65%	Marta Coldham; 833; 7.55%		Merv Leitch
Calgary-Elbow	David J. Russell; 5,941; 65.67%	Patricia (Pat) Sveen; 1,321; 14.60%	William J. Oxendale; 531; 5.87%	John S. Webb; 1,227; 13.56%		David J. Russell
Calgary-Fish Creek	William Edward Payne; 9,187; 75.94%	Al Green; 1,190; 9.84%	Margaret Young; 481; 3.98%	Jerry Sykes; 1,225; 10.13%		
Calgary-Foothills	Stewart A. McCrae; 7,518; 61.89%	Lorraine Law; 2,835; 23.34%	Steve G. Arnett; 982; 8.08%	Catherine M. Fitzpatrick; 789; 6.50%		Stewart A. McCrae
Calgary-Forest Lawn	John Zaozirny; 5,901; 59.39%	Don Howes; 2,263; 22.78%	Doug Murdoch; 813; 8.18%	Marg Bogstie; 284; 2.86%	John Sutherland (Ind.); 577; 5.81% Bruce Potter (Comm.); 47; 0.47%	
Calgary-Glenmore	Hugh L. Planche; 8,212; 55.74%	Ernie Kaszas; 1,280; 8.69%	Neil Ellison; 442; 3.00%	Nicholas Taylor; 4,774; 32.40%		Hugh L. Planche
Calgary-McCall	Andrew Little; 7,918; 70.39%	Jim Richards; 1,757; 15.62%	Dave Hammond; 838; 7.45%	Ron Chahal; 691; 6.14%	Michael J. Parker (Comm.); 20; 0.18%	Andrew Little
Calgary-McKnight	Eric Charles Musgreave; 7,248; 61.61%	Jerry Melchin; 2,684; 22.82%	Jack Dale; 1,097; 9.33%	John J. Gleason; 664; 5.64%		Eric Charles Musgreave
Calgary-Millican	David John Carter; 4,034; 61.80%	Arthur J. Dixon; 1,539; 23.58%	Stan Johns; 595; 9.11%	Bob Cox; 331; 5.07%		Thomas Charles Donnelly
Calgary-Mountain View	Stan Kushner; 5,141; 54.54%	Scott Saville; 1,986; 21.07%	Martin Serediak; 1,455; 15.44%	John Donnachie; 804; 8.53%		John Kushner
Calgary-North Hill	Ed Oman; 6,760; 64.41%	Dennis Shupe; 1,799; 17.14%	Agnes Middleton; 1,052; 10.02%	Dorothy Groves; 747; 7.12%	John J. Jasienczyk (Ind.); 71; 0.68%	Roy Alexander Farran
Calgary-North West	Sheila Embury; 5,976; 61.59%	Harold Gunderson; 2,043; 21.06%	Ken Richmond; 721; 7.43%	George R.D. Goulet; 950; 9.79%		
Calgary-West	Peter Lougheed; 7,825; 72.44%	Frank F. Cottingham; 930; 8.61%	Ed Smith; 699; 6.47%	Barbara Ann Scott; 874; 8.09%	Jacob H. Binnema (Ind. Christian); 406; 3.78%	Peter Lougheed
Camrose	Gordon Stromberg; 7,998; 60.06%	Ralph A. Sorenson; 3,121; 23.44%	Arthur C. Bunney; 1,888; 14.18%	John R. Shores; 278; 2.09%		Gordon Stromberg
Cardston	John Thompson; 2,832; 53.89%	Broyce G. Jacobs; 2,196; 41.79%	Rosemarie M. Buchannan; 102; 1.94%	Paul Shaw; 115; 2.19%		John Thompson
Chinook	Henry Kroeger; 4,024; 66.11%	Arlie Reil; 1,310; 21.52%	John W. Oberg; 406; 6.67%	Sheila Noonan; 314; 5.16%		
Clover Bar	C.G. Thomlinson; 3,947; 34.90%	Walt A. Buck; 6,033; 53.35%	Graham Griffiths; 1,102; 9.75%	Alan M.F. Dunn; 211; 1.87%		Walt A. Buck
Cypress	Alan Hyland; 3,353; 56.90%	Vern Beck; 1,907; 32.36%	Clarence W. Smith; 499; 8.47%	Carl Pattison; 123; 2.09%		Alan Hyland
Drayton Valley	Shirley Cripps; 3,530; 56.75%	Phil Turner; 1,284; 20.64%	Gerry Hutchinson; 1,290; 20.74%	Harold Knopke; 94; 1.51%		Rudolph Zander
Drumheller	Lewis (Mickey) Clark; 5,585; 54.56%	Ken Taylor; 1,913; 18.69%	Ray Garrett; 526; 5.14%	Charles J. Dirk; 209; 2.04%	Vern Hoff (Ind.); 1,927; 18.83%	Gordon Edward Taylor
Edmonton-Avonmore	Horst A. Schmid; 5,382; 53.91%	Walter Zucht; 1,691; 16.94%	Olga Blondheim; 2,363; 23.67%	Betty Ann Dumbeck; 511; 5.12%		Horst A. Schmid
Edmonton-Belmont	William L. Mack; 4,923; 54.90%	Ron Mix; 1,813; 20.22%	Haddie Jahner; 1,769; 19.73%	Charalee Graydon; 369; 4.12%		Albert Edward Hohol
Edmonton-Beverly	Bill W. Diachuk; 3,756; 50.29%	Pat G.A. O'Hara; 854; 11.44%	Gene Mitchell; 2,592; 34.71%	Teresa McKerral; 231; 3.09%		Bill W. Diachuk
Edmonton-Calder	Tom Chambers; 5,205; 58.18%	Dan R. Service; 982; 10.98%	Bill Kobluk; 2,180; 24.37%	Richard Guthrie; 535; 5.98%		Tom Chambers
Edmonton-Centre	Mary LeMessurier; 4,550; 54.19%	Robert J. Dunseith; 838; 9.98%	Harry C. Midgley; 2,273; 27.07%	Leonard Stahl; 704; 8.38%		Gordon Miniely
Edmonton-Glengarry	Rollie Cook; 4,309; 54.95%	Victor Nakonechny; 1,277; 16.29%	David Stewart; 1,489; 18.99%	Ronald John Hayter; 719; 9.17%		
Edmonton-Glenora	Lou Hyndman; 6,597; 61.23%	Patrice Taylor; 1,330; 12.34%	Doug Trace; 1,838; 17.06%	David Panar; 967; 8.97%		Lou Hyndman
Edmonton-Gold Bar	Alois Paul Hiebert; 6,044; 55.93%	Ace Cetinski; 1,397; 12.93%	Kathleen Wright; 2,343; 21.68%	Laurie Switzer; 1,002; 9.27%		William Yurko
Edmonton-Highlands	David T. King; 4,644; 56.28%	Sam Motrich; 770; 9.33%	Clifford Gladue; 2,065; 25.03%	Ted Power; 594; 7.20%	William A. Tuomi (Comm.); 84; 1.02% Roger Lavoie (Ind.); 65; 0.79%	David T. King
Edmonton-Jasper Place	Leslie Gordon Young; 5,049; 60.16%	Ralph Frank Watzke; 1,037; 12.36%	Charlie Wood; 1,735; 20.67%	Gerald F. Paschen; 554; 6.60%		Leslie Gordon Young
Edmonton-Kingsway	Kenneth R.H. Paproski; 4,387; 50.44%	Martin Hattersly; 975; 11.21%	Alex McEachern; 2,563; 29.47%	Dorothy A. Richardson; 684; 7.86%	Eddie Keehn (Ind.); 51; 0.59%	Kenneth R.H. Paproski
Edmonton-Meadowlark	Gerard Joseph Amerongen; 7,075; 59.97%	Russ Forsythe; 1,237; 10.48%	Jim Bell; 2,098; 17.78%	Ron Charko; 904; 7.66%	C.A. Douglas Ringrose (Ind.); 448; 3.80%	Gerard Joseph Amerongen
Edmonton-Mill Woods	Milt Pahl; 4,299; 56.16%	Rudy Rodriques; 573; 7.49%	L. (Les) Owre; 1,552; 20.27%	Rose MacPherson; 989; 12.92%		
Edmonton-Norwood	Catherine Chichak; 3,950; 46.61%	Mike Ekelund; 703; 8.29%	Ray Martin; 3,194; 37.69%	Walter G. Coombs; 486; 5.73%	Kimball Cariou (Comm.); 45; 0.53%	Catherine Chichak
Edmonton-Parkallen	Neil S. Crawford; 6,457; 50.47%	Morley MacCalder; 1,483; 11.59%	Jim Russell; 4,102; 32.06%	Philip Lister; 724; 5.66%		Neil S. Crawford
Edmonton-Sherwood Park	Henry Woo; 6,285; 60.57%	Oran Johnson; 1,594; 15.36%	Jim Denholm; 1,682; 16.21%	Stephen Lindop; 795; 7.66%		
Edmonton-Strathcona	Julian Koziak; 5,464; 44.94%	E.J.C. Charman; 927; 7.62%	Gordon S.B. Wright; 4,808; 39.54%	George Walton; 739; 6.08%	Gerry Ball (Ind. P.C.); 155; 1.28% Joseph Hill (Comm.); 52; 0.43%	Julian Koziak
Edmonton-Whitemud	Peter Knaak; 6,833; 57.54%	Larry Heth; 939; 7.91%	Ted Paszek; 2,122; 17.87%	Don Milliken; 1,964; 16.54%		Donald Ross Getty
Edson	Ian Reid; 4,517; 53.62%	W.L. Land; 676; 8.02%	Ron Hodgins; 2,958; 35.11%	Herbert Maris; 260; 3.09%		Robert W. Dowling
Grande Prairie	Elmer Borstad; 6,313; 50.12%	Donald Wood; 3,380; 26.84%	Campbell Ross; 2,266; 17.99%	Helen Rice; 601; 4.77%		Winston Backus
Highwood	George Wolstenholme; 5,103; 66.35%	Don Dixon; 2,092; 27.20%	William C. McCutcheon; 281; 3.65%	Joan Cowling; 191; 2.48%		George Wolstenholme
Innisfail	Nigel I. Pengelly; 4,263; 55.38%	Stuart Little; 2,921; 37.94%	Tim Guilbault; 371; 4.82%	Janet Gratton; 101; 1.31%		Clifford L. Doan
Lac La Biche-McMurray	Norman A. Weiss; 3,431; 49.68%	Conrad Sehn; 1,347; 19.50%	Claire E. Williscroft; 1,777; 25.73%	Denise Diesel; 320; 4.63%		Ron Tesolin
Lacombe	John William Cookson; 4,458; 64.11%	Elmer Suominen; 1,409; 20.26%	Arthur Wigmore; 717; 10.31%	Roger C. Holteen; 260; 3.74%	Gordon Crofton (Ind.); 85; 1.22%	John William Cookson
Lesser Slave Lake	Larry R. Shaben; 2,313; 45.82%	Peter Moore; 1,743; 34.53%	Mike Poulter; 799; 15.83%	Dan Backs; 171; 3.39%		Larry R. Shaben
Lethbridge-East	Archibald Dick Johnston; 5,870; 59.35%	Roxie McCallum; 1,223; 12.37%	Roger Rickwood; 692; 7.00%	Frank Merkl; 666; 6.73%	Ken Kotkas (Ind. Con.); 1,375; 13.99%	Archibald Dick Johnston
Lethbridge-West	John Gogo; 5,682; 64.60%	Jerry Waldern; 1,625; 18.47%	Ron Clark; 971; 11.04%	Bob Wilson; 511; 5.81%		John Gogo
Little Bow	Richard Papworth; 1,684; 29.37%	Raymond Albert Speaker; 3,748; 65.38%	Beth Jantzie; 236; 4.12%	John W. Fujimargari; 43; 0.75%		Raymond Albert Speaker
Lloydminster	James Edgar Miller; 4,674; 78.49%	Patrick A. Moore; 445; 7.47%	Elinar A. Jonson; 680; 11.42%	Gregory R. Berry; 131; 2.20%		James Edgar Miller
Macleod	LeRoy Fjordbotten; 4,189; 58.79%	Roelof A. Heinen; 2,369; 33.25%	Kathleen M. Cairns; 384; 5.39%	Alfred Saddleback; 171; 2.40%		Thomas James John Walker
Medicine Hat	James Horsman; 10,107; 72.59%	Lee Anderson; 1,904; 13.67%	Frances Ost; 1,134; 8.14%	Louise Mercier; 729; 5.24%		
Olds-Didsbury	Bill Edgar; 2,514; 27.50%	Robert Curtis Clark; 6,399; 70.00%	Gregory Hoffarth; 152; 1.66%	Stephen Shaw; 55; 0.60%		Robert Curtis Clark
Peace River	Al (Boomer) Adair; 3,901; 59.77%	Garry Gaudet; 784; 12.01%	Richard Collins; 1,604; 24.57%	Donald W. Freeland; 234; 3.59%		Al (Boomer) Adair
Pincher Creek-Crowsnest	Frederick Deryl Bradley; 3,567; 60.43%	Robert (Bob) Westrop; 1,503; 25.46%	Ian Downie; 628; 10.64%	Ann Gill; 181; 3.07%		Frederick Deryl Bradley
Ponoka	Donald J. McCrimmon; 3,317; 50.17%	Roy Kinley; 1,856; 28.07%	Bruce A. Beck; 1,279; 19.34%	Gus Itzek; 113; 1.71%		Donald J. McCrimmon
Red Deer	Norman F. Magee; 5,727; 43.14%	Bob Mills; 5,406; 40.72%	Ken McMillan; 1,861; 14.02%	Hubert Bouten; 258; 1.94%		James L. Foster
Redwater-Andrew	George Topolnisky; 3,945; 52.31%	Erwin Hannig; 547; 7.25%	Steve Leskiw; 2,870; 38.05%	Rudolph Pisesky; 148; 1.96%		George Topolnisky
Rocky Mountain House	John Murray Campbell; 4,080; 52.99%	Lavern J. Ahlstrom; 2,628; 34.13%	John Younie; 871; 11.31%	Roger Hamilton; 104; 1.35%		Helen Hunley
Smoky River	Marvin Moore; 3,032; 51.85%	Bernard Lamoureux; 854; 14.60%	Anne Hemmingway; 1,743; 29.81%	Stephen V. Marchand; 214; 3.66%		Marvin Moore
Spirit River-Fairview	Jim Reynolds; 2,668; 39.43%	Aubrey Milner; 356; 5.26%	Grant W. Notley; 3,657; 54.05%	Terry Fletcher; 68; 1.01%		Grant W. Notley
St. Albert	Myrna Fyfe; 9,361; 58.68%	Reginald C. Petch; 1,686; 10.57%	Robert (Bob) Borreson; 3,178; 19.92%	Gerry Thibault; 1,681; 10.54%		William Ernest Jamison
St. Paul	Charles E. Anderson; 3,173; 46.26%	John Hull; 582; 8.49%	Laurent (Jeff) Dubois; 2,854; 41.61%	Orest Boyko; 219; 3.19%		Mick Fluker
Stettler	Graham L. Harle; 4,262; 69.94%	David Thomas; 1,191; 19.54%	Fred J. Rappel; 503; 8.25%	Douglas Cramer; 110; 1.81%		Graham L. Harle
Stony Plain	William Frederick Purdy; 6,927; 58.94%	Oscar Venoasen; 2,274; 19.35%	Sara Johnson; 1,218; 10.36%	Andy R. McKinnon; 1,250; 10.64%	Eleanor T. Louden (Ind. Con.); 83; 0.71%	William Frederick Purdy
Taber-Warner	Robert Bogle; 5,010; 64.98%	Paul Primeau; 2,108; 27.34%	Larry Schowalter; 214; 2.78%	Jessie Snow; 335; 4.35%		Robert Bogle
Three Hills	Connie Osterman; 4,401; 59.32%	Henry Goerzen; 2,660; 35.85%	Hugh Sommerville; 222; 2.99%	Ward Sykes; 124; 1.67%		Allan Warrack
Vegreville	John S. Batiuk; 3,835; 48.99%	Robert E. Robert; 1,210; 15.46%	Harry Babchuk; 2,490; 31.81%	Alan Arthur Vinet; 269; 3.44%		John S. Batiuk
Vermilion-Viking	Tom Lysons; 3,292; 51.46%	Doug Livingstone; 2,087; 32.62%	Grant Bergman; 877; 13.71%	Ralph A. Wilson; 118; 1.84%		Tom Lysons
Wainwright	Charles Stewart; 3,489; 56.36%	Keith Cornish; 2,103; 33.97%	Alan Richards; 509; 8.22%	Sultan Tejani; 77; 1.24%		Charles Stewart
Wetaskiwin-Leduc	Dallas Schmidt; 8,216; 58.69%	Reinhold Ortlieb; 2,702; 19.30%	Earl R. Rasmuson; 2,372; 16.94%	Brian King; 677; 4.84%		Dallas Schmidt
Whitecourt	Peter Trynchy; 3,834; 57.64%	George L. Richardson; 1,214; 18.25%	Ken Forscutt; 1,442; 21.68%			Peter Trynchy

== See also ==
- List of Alberta political parties
