= Julian Koziak =

Canadian politician (born 1940)

The Honourable Julian Koziak ECA

Member of the Legislative Assembly of Alberta
- In office 1971–1986
- Preceded by: none
- Succeeded by: Gordon Wright
- Constituency: Edmonton-Strathcona

Personal details
- Born: Julian Gregory Joseph Koziak; 16 September 1940 (age 86) Edmonton, Alberta
- Party: Progressive Conservative Association of Alberta
- Spouse(s): Barbara Lee Melnychuk (m. 19 Aug 1961)
- Education: University of Alberta

Julian Gregory Joseph Koziak ECA (born 16 September 1940) is a former politician from Alberta, Canada. He served in the Legislative Assembly of Alberta from 1971 to 1986. He was the son of John Harry and Marie (née Woytkiw) Koziak.

== Political career ==
Koziak first ran in the 1971 Alberta general election in the district of Edmonton-Strathcona. He defeated incumbent Social Credit MLA and Minister of Health Joseph Donovan Ross with nearly 50% of the popular vote.

In the 1975 general election he faced New Democrat Gordon Wright for the first time. He easily won the six-way race. After the election, Koziak was appointed Minister of Education by Peter Lougheed.

In the 1979 general election, Koziak won a rematch against Wright by a 5% margin and with 45% of the popular vote. After the election, Lougheed moved Koziak to the Ministry of Consumer and Corporate Affairs.

In the 1982 general election he faced Wright for a third time and defeated him by a slim margin. Both Wright and Koziak increased their share of the popular vote. Koziak was then appointed Minister of Municipal Affairs.

Koziak ran for the leadership of the Progressive Conservative party in 1985 and was defeated by Don Getty on the second ballot. In the 1986 general election he faced Gordon Wright once again; this time he was defeated.

Legislative Assembly of Alberta
Preceded by New District	MLA Edmonton-Strathcona; 1971-1986	Succeeded by Gordon Wright
