= Lewis Clark (Canadian politician) =

Canadian politician

Lewis Mitchell "Mickey" Clark

Member of the Legislative Assembly of Alberta
- In office March 14, 1979 – May 8, 1986
- Preceded by: Gordon Taylor
- Succeeded by: Stanley Schumacher
- Constituency: Drumheller

Personal details
- Born: November 26, 1923 Bassano, Alberta
- Died: September 17, 2003 (aged 79)
- Party: Progressive Conservative
- Occupation: politician

Lewis Mitchell "Mickey" Clark (November 26, 1923 – September 17, 2003) was a provincial politician from Alberta, Canada. He served as a member of the Legislative Assembly of Alberta from 1979 to 1986 sitting with the Progressive Conservative caucus in government.

== Political career ==
Clark ran for a seat to the Legislative Assembly of Alberta as a Progressive Conservative candidate in the Drumheller electoral district for the 1979 Alberta general election. He defeated four other candidates in a hotly contested race to pick up the seat for his party.

Clark ran for a second term in the Assembly in the 1982 Alberta general election. He was easily returned to office defeated two other candidates with a landslide majority.

He retired from provincial level politics at dissolution of the assembly in 1986.
