= Edmonton-Strathcona (provincial electoral district) =

Provincial electoral district in Alberta, Canada

Coordinates: 53.5192°N 113.5049°W

Alberta electoral district
- Edmonton-Strathcona within the City of Edmonton, 2017 boundaries.

Provincial electoral district
- Legislature: Legislative Assembly of Alberta
MLA
Naheed Nenshi
New Democratic
- District created: 1971
- First contested: 1971
- Last contested: 2025 by-election

Demographics
- Census division: Division No. 11
- Census subdivision: Edmonton

Edmonton-Strathcona is a provincial electoral district for the Legislative Assembly of Alberta, Canada. It shares the same name as the federal electoral district of Edmonton Strathcona.

The boundaries of Edmonton-Strathcona include the neighbourhoods of Garneau, Strathcona, Queen Alexandra, Pleasantview, Allendale, Malmo Plains, Empire Park, Bonnie Doon and Idylwylde, and encompasses the historic district of Old Strathcona.

== History ==
The electoral district has existed since 1971, it was created from Strathcona Centre. The boundaries have changed repeatedly.

The 2010 boundary redistribution made some changes to the boundaries. The northwestern corner of the riding had some small alterations with Edmonton-Riverview. The parcel of land that comprised the east portion of the riding to give it its distinctive ell shape was expanded from Whyte Avenue south to 63 Avenue in land that was part of Edmonton-Mill Creek the eastern border was expanded out to run on the Mill Creek Ravine with Edmonton-Gold Bar.

In the 2015 provincial election, it was the only riding in the province that did not have a Wildrose Party candidate.

=== Boundary history ===
41 Edmonton-Strathcona 2003 boundaries
Bordering districts
| North | East | West | South |
|---|---|---|---|
| Edmonton-Gold Bar and Edmonton-Centre | Edmonton-Mill Creek and Edmonton-Mill Woods | Edmonton-Riverview | Edmonton-Rutherford |
| riding map goes here | | | |
Legal description from the Statutes of Alberta 2003, Electoral Divisions Act.
Starting at the intersection of the northerly extension of 111 Street with the right bank of the North Saskatchewan River; then 1. generally northeast along the right bank of the North Saskatchewan River to Connors Road; 2. generally southeast along Connors Road to 90 Avenue; 3. east along 90 Avenue to 75 Street; 4. south along 75 Street to Whyte Avenue (82 Avenue); 5. west along Whyte Avenue (82 Avenue) to Gateway Boulevard; 6. south along Gateway Boulevard to Whitemud Drive; 7. west along Whitemud Drive to the centre line of 111 Street; 8. north along the centre line of 111 Street to 61 Avenue; 9. east along 61 Avenue to 109 Street; 10. north along 109 Street to University Avenue; 11. northwest along University Avenue to 112 Street; 12. north along 112 Street to 87 Avenue; 13. east along 87 Avenue to 111 Street; 14. north along 111 Street and its northerly extension to the starting point.
Note:

45 Edmonton-Strathcona 2010 boundaries
Bordering districts
| North | East | West | South |
|---|---|---|---|
| Edmonton-Centre and Edmonton-Highlands-Norwood | Edmonton-Gold Bar and Edmonton-Mill Creek | Edmonton-Riverview | Edmonton-Mill Woods and Edmonton-Rutherford |
Legal description from the Statutes of Alberta 2010, Electoral Divisions Act.

=== Representation history ===
Edmonton-Strathcona
| Assembly | Years | Member | Party |
|---|---|---|---|
Riding created from Strathcona Centre
| 17th | 1971–1975 | Julian Koziak | Progressive Conservative |
| 18th | 1975–1979 | Julian Koziak | Progressive Conservative |
| 19th | 1979–1982 | Julian Koziak | Progressive Conservative |
| 20th | 1982–1986 | Julian Koziak | Progressive Conservative |
| 21st | 1986–1989 | Gordon Wright | New Democratic |
| 22nd | 1989–1990 | Gordon Wright | New Democratic |
| 22nd | 1990–1993 | Barrie Chivers | New Democratic |
| 23rd | 1993–1997 | Al Zariwny | Liberal |
| 24th | 1997–2001 | Raj Pannu | New Democratic |
| 25th | 2001–2004 | Raj Pannu | New Democratic |
| 26th | 2004–2008 | Raj Pannu | New Democratic |
| 27th | 2008–2012 | Rachel Notley | New Democratic |
| 28th | 2012–2015 | Rachel Notley | New Democratic |
| 29th | 2015–2019 | Rachel Notley | New Democratic |
| 30th | 2019–2023 | Rachel Notley | New Democratic |
| 31st | 2023–2024 | Rachel Notley | New Democratic |
| 31st | 2024–2025 | Vacant | Vacant |
| 31st | 2025–Present | Naheed Nenshi | New Democratic |

The electoral district was created from the constituency of Strathcona-Centre and was first contested in 1971. Changing from a long history of electing Social Credit MLAs in the area, the constituency elected Conservative Julian Koziak from the Conservative landslide of 1971 to a local NDP breakthrough in 1986. In that period, the Conservative candidate was usually elected by a minority of the valid votes, the other votes were split between the SC, Liberal, NDP and other candidates.

Since 1975, the constituency has been one of the more left-leaning ridings in Edmonton and has held by either the NDP (1986–1993, 1997–present) or the Liberals (1993–1997) without interruption since 1986.

The election of 1971 saw a hotly contested three-way race as incumbent Social Credit MLA J. Donovan Ross ran for his sixth term in office. He had served as MLA for the predecessor district Strathcona Centre starting in 1959 and previously as an MLA for the multi-member Edmonton constituency starting in 1952. He was defeated by Progressive Conservative candidate Julian Koziak who won just under half the votes in the constituency. Partly on the strength of a clean sweep of Edmonton, the Tories pushed out Social Credit to win government for the first time. The out-going SC MLA came in second. This was the last good showing of the SC in the district as it drifted off the scene. NDP candidate Timothy Christian polled a strong vote, carrying on the strong showing of the NDP that had previously been shown in that part of Edmonton since the formation of the Alberta NDP in 1962.

Koziak ran for his second term in 1975 and faced a hotly contested race against future NDP MLA Gordon Wright. Koziak was reelected after increasing his share of the vote to 54%, and was appointed to the provincial cabinet by Peter Lougheed in 1975. Koziak and Wright would face each other four more times. Although this was during the height of the Lougheed government's popularity, Wright managed to narrow the margin each time. By 1982 Wright received only 500 fewer votes than Koziak, while Koziak won with about 48 percent of the votes cast.

The 1986 election, which saw the NDP win a record number of seats (16) in the province (up to that time), established the constituency as a stronghold for the NDP. On his sixth attempt for the seat, Wright won in resounding fashion, defeating Koziak by almost 17 points. He won his second term in 1989 with a reduced majority and died a year later on October 18, 1990, leaving the seat vacant. A by-election was held in December 1990 and returned NDP candidate Barrie Chivers with a large majority.

Chivers ran for a second term in office in the 1993 election. He was defeated by Liberal candidate Al Zariwny, who won the riding with just under 40% of the vote. The Liberals swept Edmonton that year, due in part to a massive surge under its leader Laurence Decore, a former Edmonton mayor.

Zariwny did not stand for a second term in office in 1997 and the riding returned NDP candidate Raj Pannu by 58 votes over Liberal candidate Mary McDonald. That race was split almost three ways, with Pannu winning with just 31% of the vote. The third-placing candidate, Progressive Conservative John Logan, finished just 176 votes behind Pannu.

The NDP chose Pannu to be leader of the party in 2000. He ran for a second term a year later in 2001 under the slogan Raj Against the Machine. He was re-elected with a large majority, winning over half the vote. Pannu ceded the leadership of the NDP to Brian Mason in 2004. He ran for his second term in office and won the highest vote count in Edmonton-Strathcona history, with over 60%. Pannu retired from public life at dissolution of the Legislature in 2008. In 2008, the NDP's candidate Rachel Notley won the riding, and in 2012 she was re-elected with the highest share of the vote of any MLA in Alberta, and Premier of Alberta following the results of the 2015 provincial election after succeeding Brian Mason as the leader of the NDP. Notley served in the riding until she resigned in 2024. Her successor as leader of the Alberta NDP, Naheed Nenshi, won the subsequent by-election in 2025.

== Legislative election results ==
=== Elections in the 2020s ===
Alberta provincial by-election, June 23, 2025 Resignation of Rachel Notley
| Party | Candidate | Votes | % | ±% |
|---|---|---|---|---|
| New Democratic | Naheed Nenshi | 7,952 | 82.28 | +2.55 |
| United Conservative | Darby-Rae Crouch | 1,314 | 13.60 | -3.70 |
| Liberal | Don Slater | 195 | 2.02 | – |
| Alberta Party | Samuel Petrov | 115 | 1.19 | – |
| Republican | Ravina Chand | 65 | 0.67 | +0.07 (Note: Change from the Buffalo Party, who rebranded to the Republican Party in 2025.) |
| Wildrose Loyalty Coalition | Jesse Stretch | 24 | 0.25 | -0.28 |
| Total valid votes | | 9,665 | | |
| Total rejected ballots | | | | |
| Turnout | | | | |
| Eligible voters | | | | |
| New Democratic hold | | Swing | | +3.13 |
Source(s) Source: Elections Alberta

2023 Alberta general election
| Party | Candidate | Votes | % | ±% |
|---|---|---|---|---|
| New Democratic | Rachel Notley | 13,980 | 79.73 | +7.63 |
| United Conservative | Emad El-Zein | 3,032 | 17.29 | +0.25 |
| Green | Robert Gooding-Townsend | 324 | 1.85 | +0.74 |
| Buffalo | Andrew Jacobson | 106 | 0.60 | – |
| Wildrose Loyalty Coalition | Robert Nielsen | 93 | 0.53 | – |
| Total | | 17,535 | 98.56 | – |
| Rejected and declined | | 257 | 1.44 | +0.53 |
| Turnout | | 17,792 | 59.62 | -5.40 |
| Eligible voters | | 29,841 | | |
| New Democratic hold | | Swing | | +3.69 |
Source(s) Source: Elections Alberta

=== Elections in the 2010s ===
2019 Alberta general election
| Party | Candidate | Votes | % | ±% |
|---|---|---|---|---|
| New Democratic | Rachel Notley | 14,724 | 72.10 | −8.79 |
| United Conservative | Kulshan Gill | 3,481 | 17.05 | +2.56 (Note: Change from combined Progressive Conservative and Wildrose) |
| Alberta Party | Prem Pal | 1,139 | 5.58 | +5.35 |
| Progressive Conservative | Gary Horan | 297 | 1.45 | −12.41 |
| Liberal | Samantha Hees | 239 | 1.17 | −3.11 |
| Green | Stuart Andrews | 227 | 1.11 | +1.08 |
| Alberta Independence | Ian Smythe | 86 | 0.42 | – |
| Alberta Advantage | Don Edward Meister | 62 | 0.30 | – |
| Communist | Naomi J. Rankin | 61 | 0.30 | – |
| Wildrose | Dale Doan | 57 | 0.28 | -0.35 |
| Independent | Gord McLean | 49 | 0.24 | – |
| Total valid ballots cast | | 20,422 | 99.09 | – |
| Rejected, spoiled and declined | | 188 | 0.91 | |
| Turnout | | 20,610 | 65.03 | |
| Eligible voters | | 31,695 | | |
| New Democratic hold | | Swing | | −5.67 |
Source(s) Source: "44 - Edmonton-Strathcona, 2019 Alberta general election". officialresults.elections.ab.ca. Elections Alberta.

Redistributed results, 2015 Alberta election
| Party | Votes | % |
|---|---|---|
| New Democratic | 14,856 | 80.88 |
| Progressive Conservative | 2,546 | 13.86 |
| Liberal | 787 | 4.28 |
| Wildrose | 115 | 0.63 |
| Alberta Party | 42 | 0.23 |
| Independent | 15 | 0.08 |
| Green | 6 | 0.03 |

2015 Alberta general election
| Party | Candidate | Votes | % | ±% |
|---|---|---|---|---|
| New Democratic | Rachel Notley | 13,592 | 82.42 | +19.84 |
| Progressive Conservative | Shelley Wegner | 2,242 | 13.59 | −6.43 |
| Liberal | Steve Kochan | 658 | 3.99 | −0.43 |
| Total | | 16,492 | 98.86 | – |
| Rejected, spoiled and declined | | 191 | 1.14 | +0.08 |
| Turnout | | 16,683 | 50.59 | -4.03 |
| Eligible voters | | 32,976 | | |
| New Democratic hold | | Swing | | +13.13 |
Source(s) Source: "45 - Edmonton-Strathcona, 2015 Alberta general election". officialresults.elections.ab.ca. Elections Alberta.

2012 Alberta general election
| Party | Candidate | Votes | % | ±% |
|---|---|---|---|---|
| New Democratic | Rachel Notley | 9,496 | 62.58 | +13.25 |
| Progressive Conservative | Emerson Mayers | 3,038 | 20.02 | −5.48 |
| Wildrose | Meagen LaFave | 1,788 | 11.78 | – |
| Liberal | Ed Ramsden | 670 | 4.42 | −16.22 |
| Evergreen | Terry Noel | 183 | 1.21 | −3.34 |
| Total | | 15,175 | 98.94 | – |
| Rejected, spoiled and declined | | 163 | 1.06 | +0.40 |
| Turnout | | 15,338 | 54.62 | +19.38 |
| Eligible voters | | 28,079 | | |
| New Democratic hold | | Swing | | +9.37 |
Source(s) Source: "45 – Edmonton-Strathcona, 2012 Alberta general election". officialresults.elections.ab.ca. Elections Alberta.

=== Elections in the 2000s ===
2008 Alberta general election
| Party | Candidate | Votes | % | ±% |
|---|---|---|---|---|
| New Democratic | Rachel Notley | 5,862 | 49.32 | −11.33 |
| Progressive Conservative | T.J. Keil | 3,031 | 25.50 | +7.09 |
| Liberal | Tim Vant | 2,452 | 20.63 | +5.56 |
| Green | Adrian Cole | 540 | 4.54 | +2.20 |
| Total | | 11,885 | 99.34 | – |
| Rejected, spoiled and declined | | 79 | 0.66 | -0.06 |
| Turnout | | 11,964 | 35.25 | -14.66 |
| Eligible voters | | 33,943 | | |
| New Democratic hold | | Swing | | −9.21 |
Source(s) Source: "41 – Edmonton-Strathcona, 2008 Alberta general election". officialresults.elections.ab.ca. Elections Alberta. The Report on the March 3, 2008 Provincial General Election of the Twenty-seventh Legislative Assembly. Elections Alberta. pp. 336–339.

2004 Alberta general election
| Party | Candidate | Votes | % | ±% |
|---|---|---|---|---|
| New Democratic | Raj Pannu | 7,463 | 60.66 | +10.04 |
| Progressive Conservative | Shannon Stubbs | 2,266 | 18.42 | -15.93 |
| Liberal | Steven Leard | 1,854 | 15.07 | +1.01 |
| Green | Adrian Cole | 288 | 2.34 | – |
| Alberta Alliance | Jeremy Burns | 273 | 2.22 | – |
| Social Credit | Kelly Graham | 160 | 1.30 | – |
| Total | | 12,304 | 99.28 | – |
| Rejected, spoiled and declined | | 89 | 0.72 | +0.31 |
| Turnout | | 12,393 | 49.91 | -7.03 |
| Eligible voters | | 24,830 | | |
| New Democratic hold | | Swing | | +12.99 |
Source(s) Source: Elections Alberta (November 22, 2004). "Edmonton-Strathcona Statement of Official Results 2004 Alberta general election" (PDF).

2001 Alberta general election
| Party | Candidate | Votes | % | ±% |
|---|---|---|---|---|
| New Democratic | Raj Pannu | 6,998 | 50.61 | +18.77 |
| Progressive Conservative | John Logan | 4,749 | 34.35 | +3.82 |
| Liberal | Jim Jacuta | 1,944 | 14.06 | -17.35 |
| Alberta First | James Lakinn | 136 | 0.98 | -3.13 (Note: Change from Social Credit) |
| Total | | 13,827 | 99.59 | – |
| Rejected, spoiled and declined | | 57 | 0.41 | -0.11 |
| Turnout | | 13,884 | 56.95 | +0.48 |
| Eligible voters | | 24,381 | | |
| New Democratic hold | | Swing | | +7.48 |
Source(s) Source: Alberta. Chief Electoral Officer (2001). The report of the Chief Electoral Officer on the 2000 provincial confirmation process and Monday, March 12, 2001, Provincial General Election of the twenty-fifth Legislative Assembly. Edmonton: Alberta Legislative Assembly, Office of the Chief Electoral Officer.

=== Elections in the 1990s ===
1997 Alberta general election
| Party | Candidate | Votes | % | ±% |
|---|---|---|---|---|
| New Democratic | Raj Pannu | 4,272 | 31.84 | +0.99 |
| Liberal | Mary MacDonald | 4,214 | 31.41 | -8.00 |
| Progressive Conservative | John Logan | 4,096 | 30.53 | +6.01 |
| Social Credit | John Forget | 552 | 4.11 | +1.34 |
| Greens | Myles Kitagawa | 236 | 1.76 | +0.24 |
| Natural Law | Eshwar Jagdeo | 47 | 0.35 | -0.30 |
| Total | | 13,417 | 99.48 | – |
| Rejected, spoiled and declined | | 70 | 0.52 | +0.16 |
| Turnout | | 13,487 | 56.46 | -6.55 |
| Eligible voters | | 23,886 | | |
| New Democratic gain from Liberal | | Swing | | +4.50 |
Source(s) Source: Alberta. Chief Electoral Officer (1997). Report of the Chief Electoral Officer, November, 1996 general enumeration and Tuesday, March 11, 1997 general election Twenty-fourth Legislative Assembly. Edmonton: Alberta Legislative Assembly, Office of the Chief Electoral Officer.

1993 Alberta general election
| Party | Candidate | Votes | % | ±% |
|---|---|---|---|---|
| Liberal | Al Zariwny | 6,542 | 39.40 | +15.29 |
| New Democratic | Barrie Chivers | 5,121 | 30.85 | -21.91 |
| Progressive Conservative | Don Grimble | 4,071 | 24.52 | +8.33 |
| Social Credit | Patrick D. Ellis | 460 | 2.77 | +0.37 |
| Greens | Elizabeth Paschen | 253 | 1.52 | -3.02 |
| Natural Law | E. Benjamin Toane | 108 | 0.65 | – |
| Communist | Naomi J. Rankin | 47 | 0.28 | – |
| Total | | 16,602 | 99.64 | – |
| Rejected, spoiled and declined | | 60 | 0.36 | +0.10 |
| Turnout | | 16,662 | 63.02 | +14.38 |
| Eligible voters | | 26,440 | | |
| Liberal gain from New Democratic | | Swing | | +18.60 |
Source(s) Source: Sayers, Anthony M. Canadian Elections Database, 2017, http://canadianelectionsdatabase.ca.

| December 17, 1990 by-election results | | Turnout 48.51% | | Swing | |
| Affiliation | Candidate | Votes | % | Party | Personal |
| New Democratic | Barrie Chivers | 4,927 | 52.76% | 7.08% | |
| Liberal | Nadene Thomas | 2,252 | 24.11% | -1.82% | |
| Progressive Conservative | Eric Young | 1,512 | 16.19% | -9.22% | |
| Greens | Betty Paschen | 424 | 4.54% | | |
| Social Credit | Robert Alford | 224 | 2.40% | | |
| Total | | 9,339 | | | |
| Rejected, spoiled and declined | | 24 | | | |
| Eligible electors / Turnout | | 19,252 | % | | |
| NDP hold | | | | Swing 4.45% | |

=== Elections in the 1980s ===
1989 Alberta general election
| Party | Candidate | Votes | % | ±% |
|---|---|---|---|---|
| New Democratic | Gordon S.B. Wright | 6,696 | 52.08% | -2.07% |
| Progressive Conservative | Jack Scott | 3,724 | 28.96% | -8.58% |
| Liberal | Philip Lister | 2,437 | 18.95% | 12.33% |
| Total | | 12,857 | – | – |
| Rejected, spoiled and declined | | 48 | – | – |
| Eligible electors / turnout | | 21,696 | 59.48% | 2.20% |
| New Democratic hold | | Swing | | 8.26% |
Source(s) Source: "Edmonton-Strathcona Official Results 1989 Alberta general election". Alberta Heritage Community Foundation. Source:Office of the Chief Electoral Officer; Legislative Assembly Office (2006). A Century of Democracy: Elections of the Legislative Assembly of Alberta, 1905-2005. The Centennial Series. Edmonton, AB: Legislative Assembly of Alberta. p. 369. ISBN 0-9689217-8-7. Note:Alberta Heritage Community Foundation incorrectly lists Philip Lister's vote total as 4,237, when it was 2,437.

1986 Alberta general election
| Party | Candidate | Votes | % | ±% |
|---|---|---|---|---|
| New Democratic | Gordon S.B. Wright | 6,443 | 54.15% | 9.37% |
| Progressive Conservative | Julian Koziak | 4,467 | 37.54% | -10.35% |
| Liberal | Peter Schneider | 788 | 6.62% | – |
| Representative | Shane Gordon Venner | 102 | 0.86% | – |
| Western Canada Concept | Dexter B. Dombro | 72 | 0.61% | -4.40% |
| Communist | Robin Boodle | 26 | 0.22% | -0.21% |
| Total | | 11,898 | – | – |
| Rejected, spoiled and declined | | 25 | – | – |
| Eligible electors / Turnout | | 20,815 | 57.28% | -16.35% |
| New Democratic gain from Progressive Conservative | | Swing | | 6.75% |
Source(s) Source: "Edmonton-Strathcona Official Results 1986 Alberta general election". Alberta Heritage Community Foundation.

1982 Alberta general election
| Party | Candidate | Votes | % | ±% |
|---|---|---|---|---|
| Progressive Conservative | Julian Koziak | 7,105 | 47.90% | 2.91% |
| New Democratic | Gordon S.B. Wright | 6,643 | 44.78% | 5.19% |
| Western Canada Concept | Randy Coombes | 743 | 5.01% | – |
| Reform | Murray W. Scambler | 279 | 1.88% | – |
| Communist | Joe Hill | 64 | 0.43% | 0.00% |
| Total | | 14,834 | – | – |
| Rejected, spoiled and declined | | 51 | – | – |
| Eligible electors / turnout | | 20,216 | 73.63% | 6.06% |
| Progressive Conservative hold | | Swing | | -1.14% |
Source(s) Source: "Edmonton-Strathcona Official Results 1982 Alberta general election". Alberta Heritage Community Foundation.

=== Elections in the 1970s ===
1979 Alberta general election
| Party | Candidate | Votes | % | ±% |
|---|---|---|---|---|
| Progressive Conservative | Julian Koziak | 5,464 | 44.99% | -9.46% |
| New Democratic | Gordon S.B. Wright | 4,808 | 39.59% | 10.87% |
| Social Credit | E.J.C. Charman | 927 | 7.63% | -2.83% |
| Liberal | George Walton | 739 | 6.08% | 0.43% |
| Independent PC | Gerry Ball | 155 | 1.28% | – |
| Communist | Joseph Hill | 52 | 0.43% | 0.05% |
| Total | | 12,145 | – | – |
| Rejected, spoiled and declined | | 14 | – | – |
| Eligible electors / turnout | | 17,995 | 67.57% | 12.01% |
| Progressive Conservative hold | | Swing | | -10.16% |
Source(s) Source: "Edmonton-Strathcona Official Results 1979 Alberta general election". Alberta Heritage Community Foundation.

1975 Alberta general election
| Party | Candidate | Votes | % | ±% |
|---|---|---|---|---|
| Progressive Conservative | Julian Koziak | 3,996 | 54.45% | 4.48% |
| New Democratic | Gordon S.B. Wright | 2,108 | 28.72% | 11.40% |
| Social Credit | Betty Horch | 768 | 10.46% | -22.25% |
| Liberal | Arthur Yates | 415 | 5.65% | – |
| Communist | Kimball Cariou | 28 | 0.38% | – |
| Constitutional Socialist | Harry Garfinkel | 24 | 0.33% | – |
| Total | | 7,339 | – | – |
| Rejected, spoiled and declined | | 32 | – | – |
| Eligible electors / turnout | | 13,268 | 55.55% | -14.43% |
| Progressive Conservative hold | | Swing | | 4.24% |
Source(s) Source: "Edmonton-Strathcona Official Results 1975 Alberta general election". Alberta Heritage Community Foundation.

1971 Alberta general election
| Party | Candidate | Votes | % | ±% |
|---|---|---|---|---|
| Progressive Conservative | Julian Koziak | 4,541 | 49.97% | – |
| Social Credit | Joseph Donovan Ross | 2,973 | 32.71% | – |
| New Democratic | Timothy Christian | 1,574 | 17.32% | – |
| Total | | 9,088 | – | – |
| Rejected, spoiled and declined | | 46 | – | – |
| Eligible electors / turnout | | 13,051 | 69.99% | – |
| Progressive Conservative pickup new district. | | | | |
Source(s) Source: "Edmonton-Strathcona Official Results 1971 Alberta general election". Alberta Heritage Community Foundation.

== Referendum results ==
2026 Alberta referendum
| Side | Votes | % |
|---|---|---|
| Remain | 21,332 | 90.35 |
| Referendum | 2,058 | 9.65 |

== Senate nominee election results ==
2004 Alberta Senate nominee election: Edmonton-Strathcona
| Party | Candidate | Votes | % votes | % ballots | Place |
|---|---|---|---|---|---|
| Independent | Link Byfield | 3,780 | 16.52 | 47.76 | 4 |
| Progressive Conservative | Betty Unger | 3,381 | 14.77 | 42.72 | 2 |
| Independent | Tom Sindlinger | 3,221 | 14.07 | 40.70 | 9 |
| Progressive Conservative | Bert Brown | 2,123 | 9.28 | 26.83 | 1 |
| Progressive Conservative | Cliff Breitkreuz | 2,084 | 9.11 | 26.33 | 3 |
| Alberta Alliance | Michael Roth | 1,924 | 8.41 | 24.31 | 7 |
| Progressive Conservative | David Usherwood | 1,667 | 7.28 | 21.06 | 6 |
| Alberta Alliance | Vance Gough | 1,663 | 7.27 | 21.06 | 8 |
| Alberta Alliance | Gary Horan | 1,627 | 7.11 | 20.56 | 10 |
| Progressive Conservative | Jim Silye | 1,418 | 6.18 | 17.92 | 5 |
| Total valid votes / Total valid ballots | | 22,888 | 7,914 | | |
| Rejected, spoiled and declined | | 4,335 | | | |
| Registered voters / Turnout | | 24,830 | 31.87 | | |
Source(s) "Senate Nominee Election 2004 Tabulation of Official Results" (PDF). Elections Alberta. Archived from the original (PDF) on July 4, 2009.

2012 Alberta Senate nominee election: Edmonton-Strathcona
| Party | Candidate | Votes | % votes | % ballots | Place |
|---|---|---|---|---|---|
| Evergreen | Elizabeth Johannson | 3,463 | 13.47 | 31.49 | 7 |
| Progressive Conservative | Doug Black | 3,246 | 12.63 | 29.52 | 1 |
| Independent | Ian Urquhart | 2,959 | 11.51 | 26.91 | 10 |
| Progressive Conservative | Scott Tannas | 2,508 | 9.76 | 22.81 | 2 |
| Progressive Conservative | Mike Shaikh | 2,399 | 9.33 | 21.82 | 3 |
| Independent | Len Bracko | 1,985 | 7.72 | 18.05 | 8 |
| Independent | David Fletcher | 1,770 | 6.89 | 16.10 | 9 |
| Independent | Paul Frank | 1,354 | 5.27 | 12.31 | 11 |
| Independent | William Exelby | 1,328 | 5.17 | 12.08 | 12 |
| Wildrose | Raymond Germain | 1,256 | 4.89 | 11.42 | 5 |
| Wildrose | Rob Gregory | 1,241 | 4.83 | 11.29 | 4 |
| Wildrose | Vitor Marciano | 1,120 | 4.36 | 10.19 | 6 |
| Independent | Perry Chahal | 1,077 | 4.19 | 9.79 | 13 |
| Total valid votes / Total valid ballots | | 25,706 | 10,996 | | |
| Rejected, spoiled and declined | | 3,947 | | | |
| Registered voters / Turnout | | 28,079 | 39.16 | | |
Source(s) Elections Alberta. "Senate Nominee Election Tabulation of Official Results" (PDF).

== Student vote results ==
Participating schools
Strathcona High School

On November 19, 2004, a student vote was conducted at participating Alberta schools to parallel the 2004 Alberta general election results. The vote was designed to educate students and simulate the electoral process for persons who have not yet reached the legal majority. The vote was conducted in 80 of the 83 provincial electoral districts with students voting for actual election candidates. Schools with a large student body that reside in another electoral district had the option to vote for candidates outside of the electoral district then where they were physically located.

2004 Alberta student vote results
| Affiliation | Candidate | Votes | % |
| NDP | Raj Pannu | 350 | 37.35% |
| Liberal | Stephen Leard | 279 | 29.78% |
| Progressive Conservative | Shannon Stubbs | 177 | 18.89% |
| Green | Adrian Cole | 73 | 7.79% |
| Alberta Alliance | Jeremy Burns | 37 | 3.95% |
| Social Credit | Kelly Graham | 21 | 2.24% |
| Total | | 937 | 100% |
| Rejected, spoiled and declined | | 1 | |

2012 Alberta student vote results
| Affiliation | Candidate | Votes | % |
| NDP | Rachel Notley | 588 | 32.54% |
| Progressive Conservative | Emerson Mayers | 461 | 25.51% |
| Liberal | Ed Ramsden | 413 | 22.86% |
| Wildrose | Meagen LeFave | 205 | 11.34% |
| Evergreen | Terry Noel | 140 | 7.75% |
| Total | | 1,807 | 100% |

== See also ==
- List of Alberta provincial electoral districts
- Canadian provincial electoral districts

Legislative Assembly of Alberta
| Preceded by Calgary-Foothills | Constituency represented by the premier of Alberta; 2015–2019 | Succeeded by Calgary-Lougheed |
