= Edmonton-Belmont =

Defunct provincial electoral district in Alberta, Canada

Coordinates: 53.595°N 113.395°W

Alberta electoral district

Defunct provincial electoral district
- Legislature: Legislative Assembly of Alberta
- District created: 1971
- District abolished: 1993
- First contested: 1971
- Last contested: 1989

Edmonton-Belmont was a provincial electoral district in Alberta, Canada, mandated to return a single member to the Legislative Assembly of Alberta using the first past the post method of voting from 1971 to 1993.

== History ==
The Edmonton-Belmont electoral district was created prior to the 1971 Alberta general election from the Edmonton North East electoral district.

The Edmonton-Belmont electoral district was abolished in the 1993 boundary redistribution and was combined with a small portion of Edmonton-Beverly to form Edmonton-Manning electoral district.

=== Members of the Legislative Assembly (MLAs) ===
Members of the Legislative Assembly for Edmonton-Belmont
Assembly	Years	Member	Party
See Edmonton North East electoral district from 1959-1971
17th	1971–1975	Bert Hohol	Progressive Conservative
18th	1975–1979	Bert Hohol	Progressive Conservative
19th	1979–1982	William L. Mack	Progressive Conservative
20th	1982–1986	Walter Richard Szwender	Progressive Conservative
21st	1986–1989	Tom Sigurdson	New Democratic
22nd	1989–1993	Tom Sigurdson	New Democratic
See Edmonton-Manning electoral district from 1993-Present and Edmonton-Beverly-Belmont electoral district from 1993-1997

== Election results ==
=== 1971 ===
1971 Alberta general election
Party	Candidate	Votes	%	±%
Progressive Conservative	Bert Hohol	6,018	50.02%	–
Social Credit	Werner Schmidt	4,052	33.68%	–
New Democratic	Gordon Wright	1,960	16.29%	–
Total		12,030	–	–
Rejected, spoiled and declined		96	–	–
Eligible electors / turnout		16,749	72.40%	–
Progressive Conservative pickup new district.				
Source(s) Source: "Edmonton-Belmont Official Results 1971 Alberta general election". Alberta Heritage Community Foundation.

=== 1975 ===
1975 Alberta general election
Party	Candidate	Votes	%	±%
Progressive Conservative	Bert Hohol	6,662	64.85%	14.82%
New Democratic	Ashley Pachal	1,759	17.12%	0.83%
Social Credit	Victor Nakonechny	1,164	11.33%	-22.35%
Liberal	John Day	661	6.43%	–
Communist	Chris Hansen	27	0.26%	–
Total		10,273	–	–
Rejected, spoiled and declined		21	–	–
Eligible electors / turnout		22,559	45.63%	–
Progressive Conservative hold		Swing		15.69%
Source(s) Source: "Edmonton-Belmont Official Results 1975 Alberta general election". Alberta Heritage Community Foundation.

=== 1979 ===
1979 Alberta general election
Party	Candidate	Votes	%	±%
Progressive Conservative	William L. Mack	4,923	55.48%	-9.37%
Social Credit	Ron Mix	1,813	20.43%	9.10%
New Democratic	Haddie Jahner	1,769	19.93%	2.81%
Liberal	Charalee Graydon	369	4.16%	-2.28%
Total		8,874	–	–
Rejected, spoiled and declined		N/A	–	–
Eligible electors / turnout		18,736	47.36%	–
Progressive Conservative hold		Swing		-6.34%
Source(s) Source: "Edmonton-Belmont Official Results 1979 Alberta general election". Alberta Heritage Community Foundation.

=== 1982 ===
1982 Alberta general election
Party	Candidate	Votes	%	±%
Progressive Conservative	Walter Richard Szwender	6,579	54.79%	-0.68%
New Democratic	John Younie	3,893	32.42%	12.49%
Western Canada Concept	Dennis Peter	986	8.21%	–
Independent	Elmer Knutson	512	4.26%	–
Communist	Joan Jenkins	37	0.31%	–
Total		12,007	–	–
Rejected, spoiled and declined		63	–	–
Eligible electors / turnout		20,341	59.34%	–
Progressive Conservative hold		Swing		-6.34%
Source(s) Source: "Edmonton-Belmont Official Results 1982 Alberta general election". Alberta Heritage Community Foundation.

=== 1986 ===
1986 Alberta general election
Party	Candidate	Votes	%	±%
New Democratic	Tom Sigurdson	4,491	43.01%	10.59%
Progressive Conservative	Walter Richard Szwender	3,160	30.27%	-24.53%
Liberal	Pat Sembaliuk	2,486	23.81%	–
Representative	Bette Davies	198	1.90%	–
Heritage Party	Joe Kovacs	67	0.64%	–
Communist	David Wallis	39	0.37%	0.07%
Total		10,441	–	–
Rejected, spoiled and declined		25	–	–
Eligible electors / turnout		21,669	48.30%	–
New Democratic gain from Progressive Conservative		Swing		-4.81%
Source(s) Source: "Edmonton-Belmont Official Results 1986 Alberta general election". Alberta Heritage Community Foundation.

=== 1989 ===
1989 Alberta general election
Party	Candidate	Votes	%	±%
New Democratic	Tom Sigurdson	5,319	40.74%	-2.27%
Liberal	Cathy Greco	4,644	35.57%	11.76%
Progressive Conservative	Walter Richard Szwender	3,093	23.69%	-6.58%
Total		13,056	–	–
Rejected, spoiled and declined		23	–	–
Eligible electors / turnout		22,860	57.21%	–
New Democratic hold		Swing		-3.79%
Source(s) Source: "Edmonton-Belmont Official Results 1989 Alberta general election". Alberta Heritage Community Foundation.

== See also ==
- List of Alberta provincial electoral districts
- Canadian provincial electoral districts
- Belmont, a neighbourhood in north-east Edmonton
