= Gordon Wright (politician) =

Canadian politician

Gordon Samuel Dales Wright

Member of the Legislative Assembly of Alberta
- In office May 8, 1986 – October 18, 1990
- Preceded by: Julian Koziak
- Succeeded by: Barrie Chivers
- Constituency: Edmonton-Strathcona

Personal details
- Born: June 28, 1927 Kingston, Jamaica
- Died: October 18, 1990 (aged 63) Edmonton, Alberta, Canada
- Party: Alberta NDP
- Occupation: lawyer, politician

Gordon Samuel Dales Wright (June 28, 1927 – October 18, 1990) was a lawyer who served as a Crown Prosecutor for the Attorney General's office, and a politician who served in the Legislative Assembly of Alberta from 1986 until his death in 1990. Born in Kingston, Jamaica, Wright was raised in England and came to Edmonton in 1953.

== Political career ==
Wright joined the Cooperative Commonwealth Federation party in the 1950s. He first ran for the Alberta legislature in the 1967 general election in the electoral district of Edmonton North; he lost to incumbent Social Credit MLA Ethel Wilson.

In 1968 he ran for the leadership of the Alberta NDP and lost to Grant Notley by 27 votes. He then became President of the party, and later held numerous other positions on the party's executive.

In the 1971 general election, Wright ran in the electoral district of Edmonton-Belmont. He lost to Progressive Conservative candidate Bert Hohol.

In the 1975 general election, Wright ran in Edmonton-Strathcona and finished a strong second to incumbent Julian Koziak. He ran against Koziak again in the 1979 general election; he doubled his popular vote since the last election but was unable to defeat him. He ran against Koziak for a third time in the 1982 general election and finished 500 votes behind him in the closest election he'd fought yet.

In the 1986 general election Wright defeated Koziak and became an MLA on his sixth attempt at office. He was re-elected in the 1989 general election.

He died of pancreatic cancer on October 18, 1990, while still in office.
