= Barrie Chivers =

Canadian politician (born 1940)

Member of the Legislative Assembly of Alberta
- In office 1990–1993
- Preceded by: Gordon Wright
- Succeeded by: Al Zariwny
- Constituency: Edmonton-Strathcona

Personal details
- Born: November 8, 1940 (age 85) Ryley, Alberta, Canada
- Party: Alberta NDP
- Education: University of Alberta
- Occupation: lawyer

Barrie Chivers (born November 8, 1940) is a former Canadian politician and current lawyer. He served as a member of the Legislative Assembly of Alberta from 1990 to 1993 sitting with the official opposition Alberta New Democrats.

== Legal career ==
Chivers has been admitted to the law society in Alberta, Northwest Territories, and Nunavut. He founded his first law firm in 1973 Wright, Chivers & Co. to practice criminal and labour law. In 1987 after his partner went into provincial politics he founded Chivers-Greckol exclusively in labour, employment and human rights law. He left his practice in 1990 after winning a seat in the legislature.

After his defeat from office Chivers resumed his legal career with the firm of Chivers Carpenter Lawyers. He also served as President of the Trade Union Lawyers' Association and a former vice president of the Canadian Association of Labour Lawyers.

== Political career ==
Chivers ran for a seat for the first time in the 1971 Alberta general election. He finished third out of four candidates behind Progressive Conservative candidate Bill Diachuk who ended up winning and defeated incumbent Social Credit MLA Lou Heard in the constituency of Edmonton-Beverly.

Chivers would run for a second time in a by-election on December 17, 1990 to fill the vacancy in the electoral district of Edmonton-Strathcona. Chivers won by a comfortable margin to hold the district for the New Democrats.

Chivers would run for a second term in the 1993 Alberta general election. He would face a crowded field of six other candidate and end up being defeated by Liberal candidate Al Zariwny in a closely contested race.
