= Al Zariwny =

Canadian politician

Member of the Alberta Legislative Assembly for Edmonton-Strathcona
- In office June 15, 1993 – February 6, 1997
- Preceded by: Barrie Chivers
- Succeeded by: Raj Pannu

Personal details
- Born: February 3, 1944 (age 82) Thorhild, Alberta, Canada
- Party: Alberta Liberal Party
- Education: University of Alberta
- Occupation: lawyer, teacher

Alfred R. Zariwny (born February 3, 1944) is a former Canadian politician who served as a member of the Legislative Assembly of Alberta from 1993 to 1997. Under the banner of the Liberal Party, he defeated New Democrat MLA Barrie Chivers in the riding of Edmonton-Strathcona. He declined to run for a second term in office and retired at dissolution of the legislature in 1997.

Legislative Assembly of Alberta
Preceded by Barrie Chivers	MLA Edmonton-Strathcona; 1993-1997	Succeeded by Raj Pannu
