= Fred Mandeville =

Canadian politician (1922–2020)

Member of the Legislative Assembly of Alberta
- In office 1967–1971
- Preceded by: William Delday
- Constituency: Bow Valley-Empress
- In office 1971–1982
- Succeeded by: Tom Musgrove
- Constituency: Bow Valley

Personal details
- Born: Frederick Thomas Mandeville; May 3, 1922 Lethbridge, Alberta, Canada
- Died: April 7, 2020 (aged 97) Bow Island, Alberta, Canada
- Party: Social Credit
- Spouse: Jeanine
- Children: 5

Frederick Thomas Mandeville (May 3, 1922 – April 7, 2020) was a politician from Alberta, Canada. He served in the Legislative Assembly of Alberta from 1967 to 1982 as a member of the Social Credit caucus both in government and in opposition. He was the last person to sit in the Alberta Legislature under the Social Credit banner.

== Political career ==
Mandeville was born in Lethbridge, Alberta. He first ran in the 1967 Alberta general election; he won the electoral district of Bow Valley-Empress by 500 votes ahead of Coalition candidate Ben MacLeod to hold the district for the Social Credit party.

Bow Valley-Empress was abolished and Mandeville ran for a second term in the new electoral district of Bow Valley in the 1971 general election. He faced a straight fight against Progressive Conservative candidate Don Murray. Mandeville improved his margin of victory in the new electoral district to pick it up for Social Credit who became the official opposition after the Progressive Conservatives formed government.

Mandeville won his third term in office in the 1975 Alberta general election. His share of the vote dropped slightly but he held his seat comfortably even as almost all other Socred candidates went down to defeat. He defeated two other candidates to retain his seat.

In the 1979 general election Mandeville won the largest share of votes of his career as he defeated three other candidates to keep his seat. During the session, former leader Robert Curtis Clark resigned, and two others, Raymond Speaker and Walt Buck, left the party to sit as independents shortly after the call of the 1982 general election, leaving Mandeville as the sole member of the once-proud party's caucus. Mandeville retired from the legislature at dissolution in 1982; he was the last person to sit in the Alberta Legislative Assembly under the Social Credit banner. He died on April 7, 2020.
