= Tom Lysons =

Canadian politician

Thomas "Tom" Fredrick Lawrence Lysons

Member of the Legislative Assembly of Alberta
- In office March 26, 1975 – May 8, 1986
- Preceded by: Ashley Cooper
- Succeeded by: Steve West
- Constituency: Vermilion-Viking

Personal details
- Born: November 20, 1934 Islay, Alberta
- Died: May 7, 1997 (aged 62)
- Party: Progressive Conservative

Thomas "Tom" Fredrick Lawrence Lysons (November 20, 1934 – May 7, 1997) was a former provincial level politician from Alberta, Canada. He served as a member of the Legislative Assembly of Alberta from 1975 to 1986.

== Political career ==
Lysons ran for a seat to the Alberta Legislature in the 1975 Alberta general election. He won the electoral district of Vermilion-Viking winning a hotly contested race to pick up the district for the governing Progressive Conservative party. He ran for a second term in office in the 1979 Alberta general election this time winning easily after significantly increasing his popular vote. Lysons would win his highest popular vote running for his final term in office in the 1982 Alberta general election. He retired from the legislature at dissolution in 1986.

Lysons died in 1997.
