= Tom Sigurdson =

Canadian politician

Member of the Legislative Assembly of Alberta for Edmonton-Belmont
- In office 1986–1993
- Preceded by: Walter Szwender
- Succeeded by: district abolished

Personal details
- Born: March 7, 1957 (age 69) Vancouver, British Columbia
- Party: Alberta New Democratic Party

Thomas Sigurdson (born March 7, 1957) is a former Canadian provincial level politician. He served as a member of the Legislative Assembly of Alberta from 1986 to 1993. He is a labour activist and organizer for the New Democratic Party in British Columbia. He is currently the executive director for the British Columbia and Yukon Territory Building and Construction Trades Council.

== Political career ==
Sigurdson was elected (re-elected) 1986 Alberta general election as a NDP candidate in the electoral district of Edmonton-Belmont. He defeated incumbent Progressive Conservative MLA Walter Szwender by a comfortable plurality. Swender and Sigurdson would face each other again in the 1989 Alberta general election, Sigurdson improved his popular vote total winning a decisive majority.

Edmonton-Belmont was abolished due to redistribution in 1993. Sigurdson ran for a third term in office in the new Edmonton-Manning electoral district for the 1993 general election. Sigurdson would end up being defeated by Liberal candidate Peter Sekulic.

Sigurdson endorsed Alberta MP Heather McPherson in the 2026 New Democratic Party leadership election.

== Organized labour ==
After leaving politics, Sigurdson became the British Columbia and Yukon Building and Construction Trades Council executive director. He worked as the Training Plan Coordinator for Teamsters Local 213 in Vancouver, British Columbia. He returned as executive director for the BC and Yukon Territory Building and Construction Trades Council in 2011.
