= Gordon Stromberg =

Canadian politician (1927–2008)

MLA for Camrose
- In office 1971–1982
- Preceded by: Chester Sayers
- Succeeded by: Ken Rostad

Personal details
- Born: December 25, 1927 New Norway, Alberta
- Died: September 7, 2008 (aged 80)
- Party: Progressive Conservative

Gordon Emil Stromberg (December 25, 1927 – September 7, 2008) was a provincial and municipal level politician from Alberta, Canada. He served as a member of the Legislative Assembly of Alberta sitting with the governing Progressive Conservative caucus from 1971 to 1986. He served as a municipal councilor for Camrose County from 1986 to 1995.

== Political career ==
Stromberg ran for a seat to the Alberta Legislature for the first time in the 1971 Alberta general election. He won the electoral district of Camrose in a tight race over Social Credit candidate Laurence Rhierson to pick up the district for the Progressive Conservatives who had formed a majority government in that election.

Stromberg ran for a second term in office in the 1975 Alberta general election. His popular vote increased and he won his first landslide as a result. Stromberg would increase his margin of victory for the third straight time in the 1979 Alberta general election. He won his district with nearly 8,000 votes defeating three other candidates.

Stromberg ran for his final term in office in the 1982 Alberta general election. He won a massive landslide winning the highest popular vote of his career. He left provincial politics to run for a seat on the Camrose County Council. He won his first term in the 1986 election and won re-election in 1989 and 1992 before retiring from municipal politics in 1995.
