= William L. Mack =

Canadian politician

William "Bill" L. Mack

Member of the Legislative Assembly of Alberta
- In office March 14, 1979 – November 1, 1982
- Preceded by: Bert Hohol
- Succeeded by: Walter Szwender
- Constituency: Edmonton-Belmont

Personal details
- Born: April 1, 1924
- Died: February 17, 2009 (aged 84)
- Party: Progressive Conservative

William "Bill" L. Mack (April 1, 1924 – February 17, 2009) was a provincial level politician from Alberta, Canada. He served as a member of the Legislative Assembly of Alberta from 1979 to 1982.

== Political career ==
Mack ran for a seat to the Alberta Legislature in the 1979 Alberta general election. He won the electoral district of Edmonton-Belmont by a wide margin to hold it for the governing Progressive Conservative party

Mack retired from provincial politics at dissolution of the assembly in 1982. He died on February 17, 2009.
