= Bert Hohol =

Canadian politician

Member of the Legislative Assembly of Alberta
- In office August 30, 1971 – March 14, 1979
- Preceded by: New District
- Succeeded by: William Mack
- Constituency: Edmonton-Belmont

Minister of Labour and Manpower
- In office September 10, 1971 – March 1975
- Preceded by: Raymond Reierson
- Succeeded by: Neil Crawford

Minister of Advanced Education and Manpower
- In office March 1975 – March 1979
- Preceded by: James Foster
- Succeeded by: Jim Horsman

Personal details
- Born: Albert Edward Hohol; December 27, 1922 Two Hills, Alberta, Canada
- Died: November 17, 2017 (aged 94) Edmonton, Alberta, Canada
- Party: Progressive Conservative

Albert Edward Hohol (December 27, 1922 – November 17, 2017) was a provincial level politician from Alberta, Canada. He was a member of the Legislative Assembly of Alberta from 1971 to 1979, sitting in the governing Progressive Conservative caucus. He served a couple of cabinet portfolios under the Peter Lougheed government.

== Political career ==
Hohol ran for a seat to the Alberta Legislature in the 1971 Alberta general election. He faced a tough race against future Member of Parliament Werner Schmidt and future MLA Gordon Wright. Hohol won the new district by a comfortable majority to pick up the seat for the Progressive Conservative party who formed government in that election.

Premier Peter Lougheed appointed Hohol to the Executive Council of Alberta to serve in his first cabinet. He was given the Minister of Labour and Manpower portfolio. Hohol ran for re-election in the 1975 Alberta general election with ministerial advantage. He was returned to his second term with a landslide. He increased his popular vote while the opposition vote collapsed.

After the election Lougheed changed Hohol's portfolio. He became the Minister of Advanced Education and Manpower. He took over advanced education and kept the manpower portion of his portfolio while giving the Labour portion to Neil Crawford. He retired from provincial politics at dissolution of the assembly in 1979. Hohol died at the age of 94 on November 17, 2017.
