= Walter Szwender =

Canadian politician

Walter Richard Szwender

Member of the Legislative Assembly of Alberta
- In office 1982–1986
- Preceded by: William Mack
- Succeeded by: Tom Sigurdson
- Constituency: Edmonton-Belmont

Personal details
- Born: October 20, 1950 (age 75) Edmonton, Alberta
- Party: Progressive Conservative
- Occupation: Teacher

Walter Richard Szwender is a former provincial level politician and teacher from Alberta, Canada. He was a member of the Legislative Assembly of Alberta from 1982 until 1986.

== Political career ==
Szwender ran for a seat to the Alberta Legislature and was elected to the electoral district of Edmonton-Belmont in the 1982 Alberta general election. He held the seat for the governing Progressive Conservative caucus.

He ran for a second term in office in the 1986 Alberta general election but was defeated in a closely contested race by the New Democrat candidate, Tom Sigurdson. Szwender finished second out of six candidates.

Szwender faced Sigurdson again three years later in the 1989 election in an attempt to retake Edmonton-Belmont and he was once again defeated, this time by a larger margin.

He attempted another come back to the Alberta Legislature by running in the 2004 provincial election in Edmonton Decore as a last-minute replacement after it was revealed that the nominated candidate, Ray Hajar, was a convicted criminal, and had years of unpaid alimony. Swzender ran against the incumbent MLA, Gary Masyk. Both Masyk and Swender were defeated by the Liberal candidate, Bill Bonko.

Szwender is a high school teacher.
