= 1975 Alberta general election =

- March 26, 1975

75 seats in the Legislative Assembly of Alberta 38 seats were needed for a majority
- Turnout: 59.58%
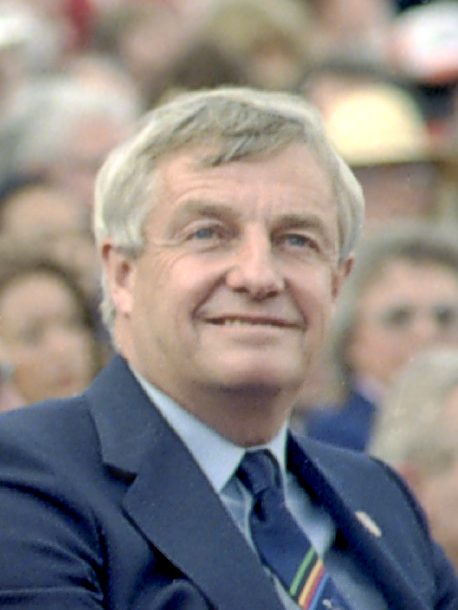

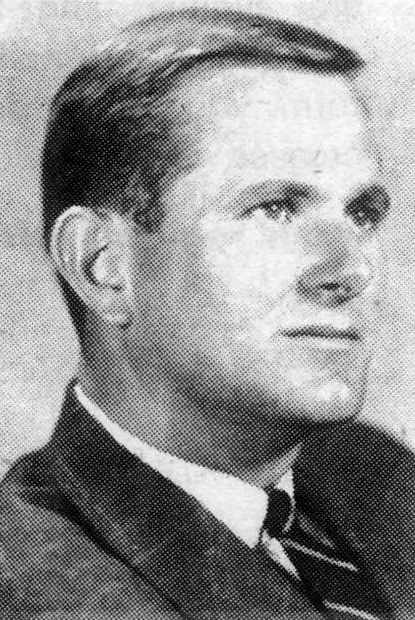
	Majority party	Minority party	Third party
		SC
Leader	Peter Lougheed	Werner Schmidt	Grant Notley
Party	Progressive Conservative	Social Credit	New Democratic
Leader since	1965	1973	1968
Leader's seat	Calgary-West	ran in Taber-Warner (lost)	Spirit River-Fairview
Last election	49 seats, 46.4%	25 seats, 41.1%	1 seats, 11.4%
Seats before	49	25	1
Seats won	69	4	1
Seat change	▲20	▼21	±0
Popular vote	369,764	107,211	76,360
Percentage	62.7%	18.2%	12.9%
Swing	▲16.3%	▼22.9%	▲1.5%
- Popular vote by riding. As this is a first-past-the-post election, seat totals are not determined by total popular vote, but instead by results in each riding.
Premier before election
Peter Lougheed
Progressive Conservative
Premier after election
Peter Lougheed
Progressive Conservative

The 1975 Alberta general election was held on March 26, 1975, to elect members of the Legislative Assembly of Alberta to the 18th Alberta Legislature. The election was called on February 14, 1975 prorogued and dissolved of the 17th Alberta Legislature.

The Progressive Conservative Party led by incumbent Premier Peter Lougheed won its second term in government in a landslide, taking over 62 per cent of the popular vote and winning 69 of the 75 seats in the legislature for a supermajority government.

After 36 years in government from 1935 to 1971—virtually its entire history—the Social Credit Party was unprepared for a role in opposition. It lost over half of its popular vote from the previous election, and was cut down to only four MLAs—just barely holding onto official party status. The only other opposition MLAs was Alberta New Democratic Party leader Grant Notley; independent Gordon Taylor supported the Tories.

== Background ==
The 1971 general election resulted in the Progressive Conservative Party led by Peter Lougheed defeating the Social Credit Party which had governed Alberta continuously for 36 years consecutive years. The Progressive Conservatives defeated the Social Credit Party by 5.3 per cent in the popular vote and formed a majority government.

Social Credit leader and former Premier Harry Strom continued as leader of the opposition until 1973 when he resigned, Strom continued in the legislature until the 1975 election, when he did not seek re-election. In the 1973 leadership election, Werner Schmidt, vice-president of Lethbridge Community College, who didn't hold a seat in the Legislative Assembly, ran against former Highways Minister Gordon Taylor, former Education Minister Robert Curtis Clark, and John Ludwig, dean of business education at Alberta College. Clark, who had the support of half of the party's MLAs, led Schmidt on the first ballot, 583 votes to 512 votes. But in an upset victory, Schmidt won on the second ballot with 814 votes, defeating Clark by 39 votes. Social Credit MLA Gordon Taylor grew detached with the party and supported Lougheed's plan to provide gas lines to rural areas. Taylor left the Social Credit caucus in 1975 just before the election.

The New Democratic Party led by leader Grant Notley captured a single seat in the 1971 general election.

The Alberta Liberal Party failed to capture a single seat in the 1971 general election led by leader Bob Russell. Russell contested the 1973 by-election in Calgary-Foothills finishing a distant fourth with 5.8 per cent of the vote. Russell resigned the leadership of the Liberal Party later in 1974, and was succeeded by Nicholas Taylor.

== Election campaign ==
=== Progressive Conservative ===
Premier Peter Lougheed enjoyed strong support from his home constituency of Calgary-West, meaning he was able to campaign throughout the province.

The Progressive Conservative Party campaigned a platform on administrative competence and promises outlined in an unpassed 1975–76 budget. Leaning on successful negotiations with the federal and Ontario governments and oil companies for the development of oil sands in the Winnipeg Agreement only 11 days before the legislature was dissolved. Other promises included the creation of the Alberta Heritage Savings Trust Fund, reduction of personal income taxes by at least 28 per cent, and increased social program spending, all of which were built on growing non-renewable natural resource revenue resulting from 1970s energy crisis.

Campaign slogans utilized by the Progressive Conservatives included "Lougheed Leadership", "43 Months of Progress", and "Vote Today for Alberta".

The Progressive Conservative government was criticized for interference with the free market, which was exemplified with the 1974 purchase of Pacific Western Airlines for $37.5-million. The Lougheed government was also criticized for significant government spending authorized through Order-in-Council instead of appropriations through the legislature.

=== Social Credit Party ===
The Social Credit Party ran a campaign advocating for the provincial government to provide low-interest loans to Albertans for housing, farming and small business purposes. Social Credit leader Werner Schmidt promoted greater revenue sharing with municipal governments, and more conciliatory stance to negotiations with the federal government, and greater emphasis on free market enterprise. The Social Credit Party referred to themselves as "the Alberta Party" throughout the election, but was unable to gather significant momentum with the phrase.

The Social Credit Party was only able to muster 70 candidates to contest the provinces 75 electoral districts. Many of the candidates focused their advertising dollars and canvassing efforts on highlighting their individual experience and value as a constituent representative rather than emphasizing the Party's platform.

=== New Democratic Party ===
NDP leader Grant Notley was elected to the Spirit River-Fairview district in 1971 by a slim margin in a competitive three-way race. The pressure in his home riding required Notley to do much of his campaigning in his home riding, and not in locations across the province.

Through his efforts in the legislature, Notley gained a reputation as a hard-working, sincere and capable representative and critic of Peter Lougheed. The NDP mustered candidates in all 75 constituencies, and as the only opposition party with a full slate of candidates, the NDP created the election slogan "The Only Real Opposition".

The NDP's campaign strategy did not emphasis socialist programs in the early stages of the campaign, instead focusing on the Lougheed government's agreement with Syncrude for developing the oil sands. Notley and the NDP believed the Syncrude agreement would be the central issue of the election, as the agreement included significant public financial investments. Notley was able to obtain several confidential government documents relating to the Syncrude project's viability which the NDP released throughout the campaign, however the Progressive Conservatives steered away from debate on the subject. Later in the election the NDP brought forward more traditional socialist programs including children's dental care, increasing old age pensions, government run auto insurance and increasing public ownership of utility companies.

=== Liberal ===
The Liberal Party focused its campaign on leader Nick Taylor's charisma and environmental opposition to the Progressive Conservatives industrialization policy. Instead the Liberal Party emphasized that Alberta's economy should be focused on renewable resources such as agriculture, timber, tourism and modern professional skills. The Liberals emphasized their platform through the campaign slogan "The Alternative".

The Liberal Party was able to field 46 candidates in the province's 75 electoral districts, although with a majority of the Party's support coming from Calgary and Edmonton, many of the rural candidates were paper candidates. Much of the Liberal campaign resources were focused on urban candidates, with most of the resources going towards Taylor's Calgary-Glenmore constituency.

== Results ==
The Progressive Conservative Party won a lopsided victory, capturing 62.7 per cent of the vote and 69 of 75 seats in the legislature. The Edmonton Report cover featured a caricature of Peter Lougheed following the victory accompanied with the title "Peter The Greatest".

The Social Credit Party dropped 21 seats (from 25 to 4), capturing 18.2 per cent of the vote. Leader Werner Schmidt failed to capture his own seat in Taber-Warner, capturing 2,418 votes (33.43 per cent), coming second to Progressive Conservative Robert Bogle who captured 4,614 votes (63.78 per cent). Independent Social Credit candidate Gordon Taylor was able to retain his seat. Schmidt resigned as leader of the Social Credit Party days after the election.

The Liberal Party grew to nearly 5 per cent of the popular vote, but secured no seats. Nick Taylor came second in his constituency of Calgary-Glenmore with 4,166 votes, behind the Progressive Conservative candidate Hugh Planche who garnered 10,641 votes. Taylor attributed the Liberal's overall poor performance to the connection with the unpopular federal Liberal Party.

The New Democratic Party leader Grant Notley was able to capture his seat in Spirit River-Fairview with 50.83 per cent of the vote, defeating his only opponent, Progressive Conservative Alex Woronuk. Despite garnering 12.9 per cent of the popular vote, the NDP was only able to capture Notley's seat. The NDP was still somewhat pleased that candidates came second in northern areas of the province and all 16 Edmonton constituencies.

Overall voter turnout in the election was 59.58 per cent.

Party	Party leader	# of candidates	Seats			Popular vote		
Party	Party leader	# of candidates	1971	Elected	% Change	#	%	% Change
Progressive Conservative	Peter Lougheed	75	49	69	+40.8%	369,764	62.65%	+16.25%
Social Credit	Werner Schmidt	70	25	4	-84.0%	107,211	18.17%	-22.93%
New Democrats	Grant Notley	75	1	1	0%	76,360	12.94%	+1.52%
Independent Social Credit		1	*	1	100%	4,428	0.75%	*
Liberal	Nicholas Taylor	46	-	-	-	29,424	4.98%	+3.97%
Independent Progressive Conservative		3	*	-	*	1,059	0.18%	*
Communist		14	*	-	*	768	0.13%	*
Independent		4	-	-		625	0.11%	+1.06%
Independent Liberal		2	*	-	*	416	0.07%	*
Constitutional Socialist	Mike Uhryn	3	*	-	*	115	0.02%	*
Total		293	75	75	-	590,200	100%	
Source: Elections Alberta

Note:

* Party did not nominate candidates in the previous election.

Popular vote
PC	62.65%
Social Credit	18.17%
New Democratic	12.94%
Liberal	4.98%
Others	1.26%

Seats summary
PC	92.00%
Social Credit	5.33%
New Democratic	1.33%
Independent	1.33%

== Results by riding ==
Electoral district	Candidates					Incumbent
Electoral district	PC	Social Credit	NDP	Liberal	Other	Incumbent
Athabasca	Frank Appleby; 3,723; 59.63%	Peter Hupka; 582; 9.32%	Peter E. Opryshko; 1,686; 27.01%	John Murphy; 226; 3.62%		Frank Appleby
Banff	Fred Kidd; 5,221; 68.92%	Merlyn Kirk; 1,129; 14.90%	Wayne Getty; 737; 9.73%	Morna F. Schechtel; 453; 5.98%		
Barrhead	Hugh F. Horner; 3,665; 67.48%	Bill Seatter; 919; 16.92%	Arlington Corbett; 826; 15.21%			Hugh F. Horner
Bonnyville	Donald Hansen; 3,226; 56.66%	George Nordstrom; 1,119; 19.65%	Franklin Foster; 805; 14.14%	Ron Pernarowski; 526; 9.24%		Donald Hansen
Bow Valley	Jim C. George; 1,906; 37.41%	Fred T. Mandeville; 2,992; 58.72%	Syd Evans; 183; 3.59%			Fred T. Mandeville
Calgary-Bow	Neil Webber; 5,251; 52.12%	Roy Wilson; 3,537; 35.11%	Jack Dunbar; 879; 8.72%	Mike Prohaszka; 314; 3.12%	David Whitefield (Comm.); 64; 0.64%	Roy Wilson
Calgary-Buffalo	Ronald H. Ghitter; 6,525; 70.69%	Norman Ashmead; 786; 8.51%	Paula Davies; 877; 9.50%	Maria Eriksen; 962; 10.42%	David Wallis (Comm.); 55; 0.60%	Ronald H. Ghitter
Calgary-Currie	Fred H. Peacock; 6,068; 72.85%	Edwin Ens; 939; 11.27%	Hiram Coulter; 713; 8.56%	Ron Chahal; 586; 7.04%		Fred H. Peacock
Calgary-Egmont	Merv Leitch; 10,867; 75.70%	Lloyd Downey; 1,119; 7.79%	Maureen McCutcheon; 712; 4.96%	Jack Haggarty; 1,634; 11.38%		Merv Leitch
Calgary-Elbow	David J. Russell; 6,159; 73.68%	Bernard Laing; 589; 7.05%	Jack Peters; 449; 5.37%	Sharon Carstairs; 1,149; 13.75%		David J. Russell
Calgary-Foothills	Stewart A. McCrae; 10,917; 67.50%	Bill Campbell; 2,587; 16.00%	Ken Gee; 1,366; 8.45%	Acker Winn (Ind. Lib.); 324; 2.01% Hilda Armstrong; 893; 5.52%	David Gutnick (Comm.); 55; 0.34%	Stewart A. McCrae
Calgary-Glenmore	Hugh L. Planche; 10,641; 65.85%	Ralph Cameron; 838; 5.19%	Bill Peterson; 498; 3.08%	Nicholas Taylor; 4,166; 25.78%		William Daniel Dickie
Calgary-McCall	Andrew Little; 9,102; 64.91%	George Ho Lem; 3,397; 24.22%	Doreen Heath; 997; 7.11%	Garry Willis; 440; 3.14%	Colin Constant (Comm.); 46; 0.33%	George Ho Lem
Calgary-McKnight	Eric Charles Musgreave; 8,586; 67.80%	Allen Howard; 1,572; 12.41%	Ray Martin; 1,747; 13.80%	Pat Smart; 743; 5.87%		Calvin E. Lee
Calgary-Millican	Thomas Charles Donnelly; 4,978; 57.56%	Arthur J. Dixon; 2,114; 24.44%	Joseph Yanchula; 940; 10.87%	Jodi Mahoney; 512; 5.92%	Mike Daniels (Comm.); 43; 0.50% Roger Lavoie (Ind.); 21; 0.24%	Arthur J. Dixon
Calgary-Mountain View	John Kushner; 3,800; 48.76%	Albert W. Ludwig; 2,562; 32.88%	Orrin Kerr; 725; 9.30%	John Sutherland; 576; 7.39%	Joe Hill (Comm.); 56; 0.72%	Albert W. Ludwig
Calgary-North Hill	Roy Alexander Farran; 6,673; 70.51%	Robert A. Simpson; 1,364; 14.41%	Joan Ryan; 723; 7.64%	Dorothy Groves; 584; 6.17%	Stephen Whitefield (Comm.); 60; 0.63%	Roy Alexander Farran
Calgary-West	Peter Lougheed; 8,983; 78.28%	Charles Gray; 1,213; 10.57%	Neil Ellison; 674; 5.87%	Steve Shaw; 564; 4.91%		Peter Lougheed
Camrose	Gordon Stromberg; 6,483; 72.40%	Ray Reid; 1,313; 14.66%	David Moore; 1,141; 12.74%			Gordon Stromberg
Cardston	John Thompson; 2,899; 59.77%	Roy Sprackman; 1,826; 37.65%	Kelty Paul; 115; 2.37%			Edgar W. Hinman
Clover Bar	Murray Finnerty; 3,211; 34.23%	Walt A. Buck; 5,151; 54.90%	Duncan McArthur; 799; 8.52%	David Cooke; 197; 2.10%		Walt A. Buck
Cypress	Alan Hyland; 2,065; 53.21%	Barry Bernhardt; 1,447; 37.28%	Allen Eng; 202; 5.20%		Margaret Dragland (Ind.); 159; 4.10%	Harry E. Strom
Drayton Valley	Rudolph Zander; 3,224; 67.77%	Tom Johnson; 513; 10.78%	Lars Larson; 815; 17.13%	Maurice Duteau; 191; 4.02%		Rudolph Zander
Drumheller	Wayne Ohlhauser; 2,678; 36.29%	Gordon E. Taylor (Ind. SoCred); 4,428; 60.20%	Larry Schowalter; 249; 3.37%			Gordon Edward Taylor
Edmonton-Avonmore	Horst A. Schmid; 4,596; 60.87%	Joe G. Radstaak; 1,341; 17.76%	Neil R. Larsen; 1,141; 15.11%	Ann Mazur; 413; 5.47%	Mike Uhryn (Con. Social.); 47; 0.62%	Horst A. Schmid
Edmonton-Belmont	Albert Edward Hohol; 6,662; 64.72%	Victor Nakonechny; 1,164; 11.31%	Ashley Pachal; 1,759; 17.09%	John Day; 661; 6.42%	Chris Hansen (Comm.); 27; 0.26%	Albert Edward Hohol
Edmonton-Beverly	Bill W. Diachuk; 5,046; 61.81%	Patrick A. Moore; 764; 9.36%	Bill Kobluk; 1,902; 23.30%	Rudolph Pisesky; 374; 4.58%	Paul Jarbeau (Comm.); 60; 0.73%	Bill W. Diachuk
Edmonton-Calder	Tom Chambers; 5,689; 67.96%		Burke Barker; 1,640; 19.59%	Jack Pickett; 620; 7.41%	Keith Lawson (Ind.); 396; 4.73%	Tom Chambers
Edmonton-Centre	Gordon Miniely; 3,996; 61.79%	Gerry Beck; 386; 5.97%	Barry Roberts; 1,125; 17.40%	Ed Molstad; 930; 14.38%		Gordon Miniely
Edmonton-Glenora	Lou Hyndman; 7,735; 74.14%	Al Opstad; 782; 7.50%	Alex McEachern; 1,837; 17.61%		William Askin (Con. Social.); 44; 0.42%	Lou Hyndman
Edmonton-Gold Bar	William Yurko; 5,247; 64.14%	Larry Latter; 982; 12.00%	Grant Arnold; 1,312; 16.04%	Don Hoyda; 579; 7.08%	Harry J. Strynadka (Comm.); 28; 0.34%	William Yurko
Edmonton-Highlands	David T. King; 3,085; 58.66%	Ambrose Holowach; 888; 16.89%	Muriel Venne; 1,129; 21.47%		William A. Tuomi (Comm.); 82; 1.56%	David T. King
Edmonton-Jasper Place	Leslie Gordon Young; 5,436; 66.02%	Don Eastcott; 1,035; 12.57%	Carol Berry; 1,192; 14.48%	Philip Lister; 491; 5.96%		Leslie Gordon Young
Edmonton-Kingsway	Kenneth R.H. Paproski; 4,897; 65.96%	Jake Johnson; 619; 8.34%	Jane Weaver; 1,418; 19.10%	Roy Landreth; 472; 6.36%		Kenneth R.H. Paproski
Edmonton-Meadowlark	Gerard Joseph Amerongen; 6,715; 67.66%	Russ Forsythe; 1,093; 11.01%	Harvey Tilden; 1,406; 14.17%	Vic Yanda; 698; 7.03%		Gerard Joseph Amerongen
Edmonton-Norwood	Catherine Chichak; 4,298; 58.80%	Alfred J. Hooke; 1,045; 14.30%	Howard Rubin; 1,849; 25.29%		Gary Hansen (Comm.); 48; 0.66%	Catherine Chichak
Edmonton-Ottewell	John G. Ashton; 8,807; 70.85%	Irvine Zemrau; 1,559; 12.54%	Jim Denholm; 2,003; 16.11%			John G. Ashton
Edmonton-Parkallen	Neil S. Crawford; 4,810; 62.18%	Glen Carlson; 904; 11.69%	Brian Fish; 1,546; 19.98%	Brian Erickson; 461; 5.96%		Neil S. Crawford
Edmonton-Strathcona	Julian Koziak; 3,996; 54.21%	Betty Horch; 768; 10.42%	Gordon S.B. Wright; 2,108; 28.60%	Arthur Yates; 415; 5.63%	Kimball Cariou (Comm.); 28; 0.38% Harry Garfinkel (Con. Social.); 24; 0.33%	Julian Koziak
Edmonton-Whitemud	Donald Ross Getty; 9,614; 67.66%	Phil Dickson; 1,101; 7.75%	Lila Fahlman; 2,645; 18.61%	Dilys Andersen; 830; 5.84%		Donald Ross Getty
Edson	Robert W. Dowling; 3,872; 64.96%	Ralph Bond; 651; 10.92%	John Lindsay; 1,426; 23.92%			Robert W. Dowling
Grande Prairie	Winston Backus; 6,466; 61.08%	John Baergen; 1,475; 13.93%	Ross Campbell; 1,962; 18.53%	Gordon Astle; 651; 6.15%		Winston Backus
Hanna-Oyen	John Edward Butler; 2,927; 68.61%	Alfred Weik; 817; 19.15%	David Urichuk; 134; 3.14%	Lyall Alexander Curry; 378; 8.86%		Clinton Keith French
Highwood	George Wolstenholme; 4,037; 63.64%	Edward P. Benoit; 1,925; 30.35%	Muriel McCreary; 234; 3.69%	Melbe Cochlan; 125; 1.97%		Edward P. Benoit
Innisfail	Clifford L. Doan; 4,029; 66.27%	Raymond C. Reckseidler; 1,512; 24.87%	Pat Loughlin; 376; 6.18%	Fred Monk; 147; 2.42%		Clifford L. Doan
Lac La Biche-McMurray	Ron Tesolin; 2,859; 52.68%	Ken Cochrane; 560; 10.32%	Ronald Morgan; 530; 9.77%	Jean Davidson; 703; 12.95%	Mike Chandi (Ind. P.C.); 737; 13.68%	Dan Bouvier
Lacombe	John William Cookson; 4,186; 68.42%	Ivan Stonehocker; 1,414; 23.11%	Ed Kamps; 486; 7.94%			John William Cookson
Lesser Slave Lake	Larry R. Shaben; 2,387; 57.91%	Dennis Barton; 921; 22.34%	John Tomkins; 791; 19.19%			Dennis Barton
Lethbridge-East	Archibald Dick Johnston; 7,233; 66.82%	John V. Anderson; 1,915; 17.69%	Bessie Annand; 1,006; 9.29%	Shirley Wilson; 645; 5.96%		John V. Anderson
Lethbridge-West	John Gogo; 3,991; 58.26%	Richard David Gruenwald; 1,914; 27.94%	Ian Whishaw; 812; 11.85%			Richard David Gruenwald
Little Bow	George McMorris; 2,019; 37.08%	Raymond Albert Speaker; 3,132; 57.52%	Wayne Doolittle; 126; 2.31%	Ben Loman; 157; 2.88%		Raymond Albert Speaker
Lloydminster	James Edgar Miller; 4,370; 81.94%		Dave Listoe; 938; 17.59%			James Edgar Miller
Macleod	Thomas James John Walker; 3,671; 55.37%	Leighton E. Buckwell; 2,359; 35.58%	Kathleen M. Cairns; 330; 4.98%	Bill Olafson; 231; 3.48%		Leighton E. Buckwell
Medicine Hat-Redcliff	James Horsman; 5,678; 46.33%	William Wyse; 5,548; 45.27%	Bill Hartley; 417; 3.40%	David Wilkins; 532; 4.34%	Hilory Sorschan (Ind. P.C.); 53; 0.43%	William Wyse
Olds-Didsbury	Kenneth Amthor; 2,860; 38.26%	Robert Curtis Clark; 4,400; 58.86%	Margaret Hinton; 209; 2.80%			Robert Curtis Clark
Peace River	Al (Boomer) Adair; 3,567; 60.76%	Budd Dennis; 897; 15.28%	John Hokanson; 1,292; 22.01%		Vera Lane (Ind. Lib.); 92; 1.57	Al (Boomer) Adair
Pincher Creek-Crowsnest	Frederick Deryl Bradley; 3,209; 59.81%	Charles Duncan Drain; 1,837; 34.24%	David Elliot; 235; 4.38%		Gwen Gyulai (Ind.); 49; 0.91%	Charles Duncan Drain
Ponoka	Donald J. McCrimmon; 3,328; 59.60%	Alvin Goetz; 1,263; 22.62%	Boug Lier; 932; 16.69%			Donald J. McCrimmon
Red Deer	James L. Foster; 6,566; 65.74%	Cecil Spiers; 1,538; 15.40%	Ken McMillan; 1,317; 13.19%	Herb Fielding; 549; 5.50%		James L. Foster
Redwater-Andrew	George Topolnisky; 3,784; 65.60%		Graham Crosbie; 1,824; 31.62%		Neil Stenberg (Comm.); 116; 2.01%	George Topolnisky
Rocky Mountain House	Helen Hunley; 4,119; 65.95%	Harvey Staudinger; 1,537; 24.61%	Morris Jenson; 576; 9.22%			Helen Hunley
Sedgewick-Coronation	Henry Kroeger; 2,757; 56.15%	Ralph A. Sorenson; 1,768; 36.01%	Gladys Creasy; 370; 7.54%			Ralph A. Sorenson
Smoky River	Marvin Moore; 3,446; 60.34%	Obert Amundson; 347; 6.08%	Victor Tardif; 1,778; 31.13%	John Hinks; 119; 2.08%		Marvin Moore
Spirit River-Fairview	Alex Woronuk; 2,918; 48.76%		Grant W. Notley; 3,017; 50.42%			Grant W. Notley
St. Albert	William Ernest Jamison; 6,450; 54.32%	Keith Everitt; 2,221; 18.70%	Earl Toane; 1,591; 13.40%	John Bakker; 1,564; 13.17%		William Ernest Jamison
St. Paul	Mick Fluker; 2,912; 57.05%	John Hull; 848; 16.61%	Pierre M. Vallee; 764; 14.97%	Roland Genereux; 561; 10.99%		Mick Fluker
Stettler	Graham L. Harle; 3,773; 74.95%	James Mah; 866; 17.20%	William Cook; 360; 7.15%			Jack G. Robertson
Stony Plain	William Frederick Purdy; 5,109; 63.31%	Dean Throness; 1,113; 13.79%	Jim Bell; 923; 11.44%	Betty Howery; 628; 7.78%	Arthur Killoran (Ind. P.C.); 269; 3.34%	William Frederick Purdy
Taber-Warner	Robert Bogle; 4,614; 63.59%	Werner G. Schmidt; 2,418; 33.32%	Brian Aman; 202; 2.78%			Douglas Miller
Three Hills	Allan Warrack; 4,268; 69.66%	Bob Sommerville; 1,406; 22.95%	Bruce Potter; 192; 3.13%	Wes Combs; 252; 4.11%		Allan Warrack
Vegreville	John S. Batiuk; 3,644; 53.26%	Ernie Youzwishen; 908; 13.27%	Barney Welsh; 2,270; 33.18%			John S. Batiuk
Vermilion-Viking	Tom Lysons; 2,731; 54.10%	Angus MacMillan; 1,274; 25.24%	Ken Jaremco; 1,019; 20.19%			Ashley H. Cooper
Wainwright	Charles Stewart; 3,039; 58.91%	Bev Penman; 1,616; 31.32%	Harold Tangen; 496; 9.61%			Henry A. Ruste
Wetaskiwin-Leduc	Dallas Schmidt; 7,544; 63.76%	Waldo Siemens; 2,076; 17.55%	Earl R. Rasmuson; 1,662; 14.05%	Pat Green; 522; 4.41%		James D. Henderson
Whitecourt	Peter Trynchy; 3,921; 71.15%	Rig Godwin; 676; 12.27%	John Udchitz; 893; 16.20%			Peter Trynchy

== See also ==
- List of Alberta political parties
