= Laurie Blakeman =

Canadian politician

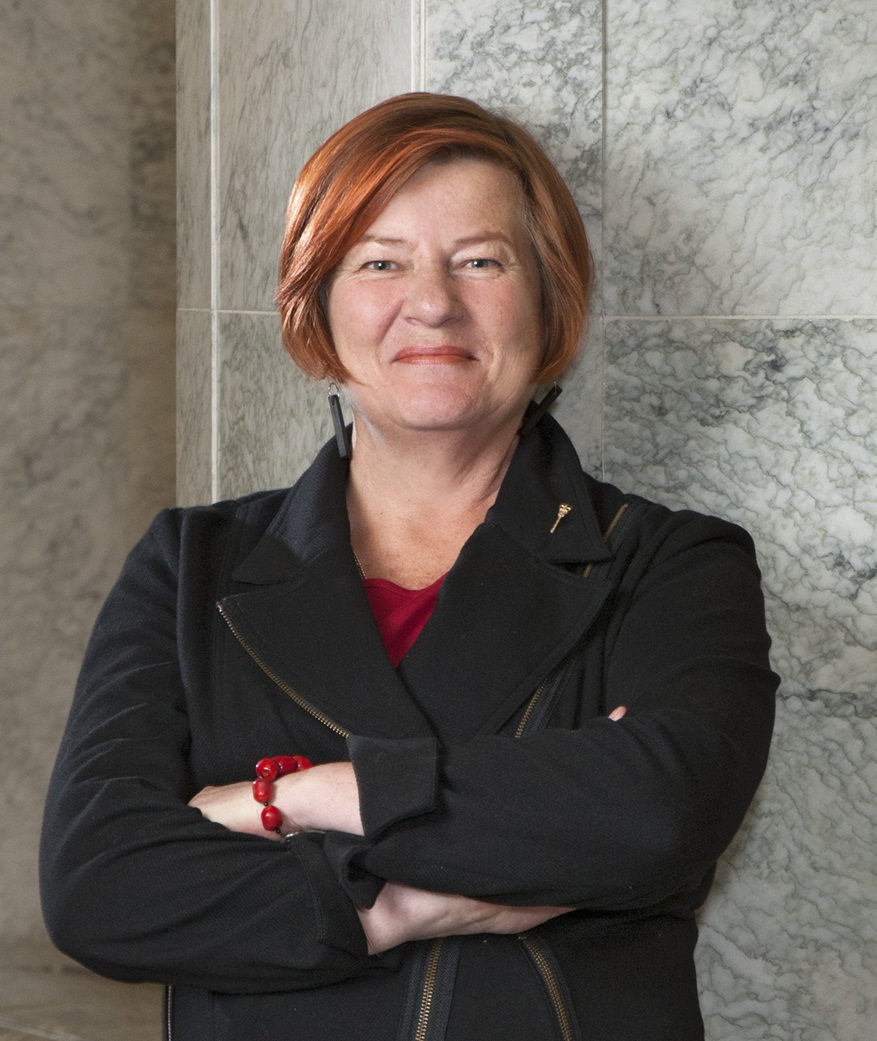

MLA for Edmonton-Centre
- In office March 11, 1997 – May 5, 2015
- Preceded by: Michael Henry
- Succeeded by: David Shepherd

Personal details
- Born: May 23, 1958 (age 68) Edmonton, Alberta, Canada
- Party: Liberal
- Spouse: Ben Henderson
- Education: University of Alberta
- Occupation: Non-profit manager

Laurie Blakeman (born May 23, 1958) is a Canadian politician, who represented the electoral district of Edmonton-Centre in the Legislative Assembly of Alberta. She is a member of the Alberta Liberal Party, and was first elected in the 1997 election.

In 2017, she was appointed as a member of the Veterans Review and Appeal Board for a five-year term.

== Early life ==
She graduated with a bachelor's degree in fine arts in acting and a certificate in public administration from the University of Alberta. Before entering politics, she worked for the Alberta Advisory Council on Women's Issues, the Phoenix Theatre and Theatre Network, the Medical Council of Canada, and the Alberta Snowmobile Association.

== Political career ==
=== Electoral record ===
Blakeman first sought political office in the 1997 provincial election, when she ran as a Liberal candidate in Edmonton-Centre to replace retiring Liberal MLA Michael Henry. She was elected, finishing more than a thousand votes ahead of the second-place finisher, Progressive Conservative Don Weideman. This gap narrowed when Weideman challenged her re-election bid in the 2001 election, but grew to more than three thousand votes in 2004. The 2008 election would bring a new Progressive Conservative Opponent, in Bill Donahue, but a similar result, as Blakeman handily retained her seat. For the 2015 election, Blakeman ran for three political parties, Liberal, Alberta Party and Greens. All to no avail as she lost her seat in the legislature in the 2015 election which saw the NDP sweep to power for the first time.

=== Legislative initiatives ===
In 1997, Blakeman sponsored the Domestic Abuse Act, a private member's bill that never reached second reading. In 1998, she brought forward the Human Rights, Citizenship and Multiculturalism Amendment Act, another private member's bill, which would have expanded the province's anti-discrimination legislation to include sexual orientation as a basis on which discrimination was prohibited (later the same year, the Supreme Court of Canada, in Vriend v. Alberta, ruled Alberta's failure to include this to be in contravention of the Charter of Rights and Freedoms); it too failed to advance to second reading.

In 1999, Blakeman sponsored the Consumers Insurance Company Act, a private bill designed to create a new insurance company, in compliance with the law that new insurance companies could only be created by acts of the legislature. However, the bill faced some opposition from Blakeman's Liberal colleagues, including Linda Sloan, Hugh MacDonald, and Gary Dickson, who expressed concern that the bill might be a step towards privatized medicine. The bill passed.

In 2007, Blakeman sponsored the Healthy Futures Act, which would have required major policy and funding decisions to undergo "health impact assessments", which would look at their impacts on Albertans' health through social and environmental impacts. Blakeman's Liberal colleagues supported the bill, as did the New Democrats (although NDP MLA Ray Martin expressed concern that the bill only required assessment, rather than action, on potential adverse health impacts) and several Progressive Conservatives. Even so, it was defeated through majority opposition of the Progressive Conservatives, many of whom expressed the view that the bill would add nothing meaningful that did not already exist under the existing regulatory framework, while, in the words of PC MLA Dave Rodney, "effectively bring[ing] the decision- making apparatus of the government and this Assembly to a grinding halt."

=== Leadership aspirations ===
After Kevin Taft announced his intention to resign the leadership of the Alberta Liberal Party following its defeat in the 2008 election, Blakeman was one of four MLAs to express interest in running in the ensuing election to replace him. However, in August she announced that she would not do so, citing the cost of a candidacy. She was a candidate in the 2011 leadership election, placing third.

=== Critic portfolios ===
- Liberal Opposition House Leader
- Critic for Environment and Sustainable Resource Development
- Critic for Culture
- Critic for Justice and Solicitor General
- Critic for Municipal Affairs

== Personal life ==
Blakeman is married to former Edmonton city councillor Ben Henderson.

== Election results ==
1997 Alberta general election: Edmonton-Centre
Party	Candidate	Votes	%	±%
Liberal	Laurie Blakeman	4,769	43.96%	-3.63%
Progressive Conservative	Don Weideman	3,634	33.50%	4.74%
New Democratic	Jenn Smith	1,845	17.01%	-2.71%
Social Credit	Alan Cruikshank	420	3.87%	2.17%
Forum	Emil van der Poorten	98	0.90%	–
Natural Law	Richard Johnsen	83	0.77%	-0.03%
Total		10,849	–	–
Rejected, spoiled and declined		43	–	–
Eligible electors / turnout		20,907	52.10%	-1.36%
Liberal hold		Swing		-4.18%
Source(s) Source: "Edmonton-Centre Official Results 1997 Alberta general election". Alberta Heritage Community Foundation.

2001 Alberta general election: Edmonton-Centre
Party	Candidate	Votes	%	±%
Liberal	Laurie Blakeman	5,095	44.01%	0.06%
Progressive Conservative	Don J. Weideman	4,446	38.41%	4.91%
New Democratic	David Eggen	1,959	16.92%	-0.08%
Communist	Naomi Rankin	76	0.66%	–
Total		11,576	–	–
Rejected, spoiled, and declined		74	–	–
Eligible electors / turnout		22,648	51.44%	-0.66%
Liberal hold		Swing		-2.43%
Source(s) Source: "Edmonton-Centre Official Results 2001 Alberta general election". Alberta Heritage Community Foundation.

2004 Alberta general election: Edmonton-Centre
Party	Candidate	Votes	%	±%
Liberal	Laurie Blakeman	6,203	57.07%	13.06%
Progressive Conservative	Don Weideman	2,622	24.12%	-14.28%
New Democratic	Mary Elizabeth Archer	1,319	12.14%	-4.79%
Greens	David J. Parker	333	3.06%	–
Alberta Alliance	Tony Caterina	280	2.58%	–
Social Credit	Linda Clements	112	1.03%	–
Total		10,869	–	–
Rejected, spoiled and declined		81	–	–
Eligible electors / turnout		22,362	48.97%	-2.47%
Liberal hold		Swing		13.67%
Source(s) Source: "Edmonton-Centre Official Results 2004 Alberta general election". Alberta Heritage Community Foundation.

2008 Alberta general election: Edmonton-Centre
Party	Candidate	Votes	%	±%
Liberal	Laurie Blakeman	5,042	44.98%	-12.09%
Progressive Conservative	Bill Donahue	3,291	29.36%	5.23%
New Democratic	Deron Bilous	2,163	19.30%	7.16%
Green	David J. Parker	472	4.21%	–
Wildrose Alliance	James Iverson	200	1.78%	–
Alberta Party	Margaret Saunter	42	0.37%	–
Total		11,210	–	–
Rejected, spoiled and declined		78	–	–
Eligible electors / turnout		30,335	37.21%	-11.76%
Liberal hold		Swing		-8.66%
Source(s) Source: "Elections Alberta 2008 General Election". Elections Alberta.

2012 Alberta general election: Edmonton-Centre
Party	Candidate	Votes	%	±%
Liberal	Laurie Blakeman	5,626	40.37%	-4.61%
Progressive Conservative	Akash Khokhar	4,296	30.82%	1.47%
New Democratic	Nadine Bailey	2,257	16.19%	-3.10%
Wildrose	Barb de Groot	1,758	12.61%	10.83%
Total		13,937	–	–
Rejected, spoiled and declined		102	–	–
Eligible electors / turnout		28,358	49.51%	12.30%
Liberal hold		Swing		-3.04%
Source(s) Source: "Elections Alberta 2012 General Election". Elections Alberta.

2015 Alberta general election: Edmonton-Centre
Party	Candidate	Votes	%	±%
New Democratic	David Shepherd	8,983	54.39%	38.19%
Liberal	Laurie Blakeman	4,199	25.42%	-14.95%
Progressive Conservative	Catherine Keill	2,228	13.49%	-17.34%
Wildrose	Joe Byram	772	4.67%	-7.94%
Independent	Greg Keating	295	1.79%	–
Independent	Rory Joe Koopmans	40	0.24%	–
Total		16,517	–	–
Rejected, spoiled and declined		64	–	–
Eligible electors / turnout		34,976	47.41%	-2.10%
New Democratic gain from Liberal		Swing		9.71%
Source(s) Source: "Elections Alberta 2015 General Election". Elections Alberta.
