= Marlin Schmidt =

Canadian politician (born 1978)

The Honourable Marlin Schmidt ECA MLA
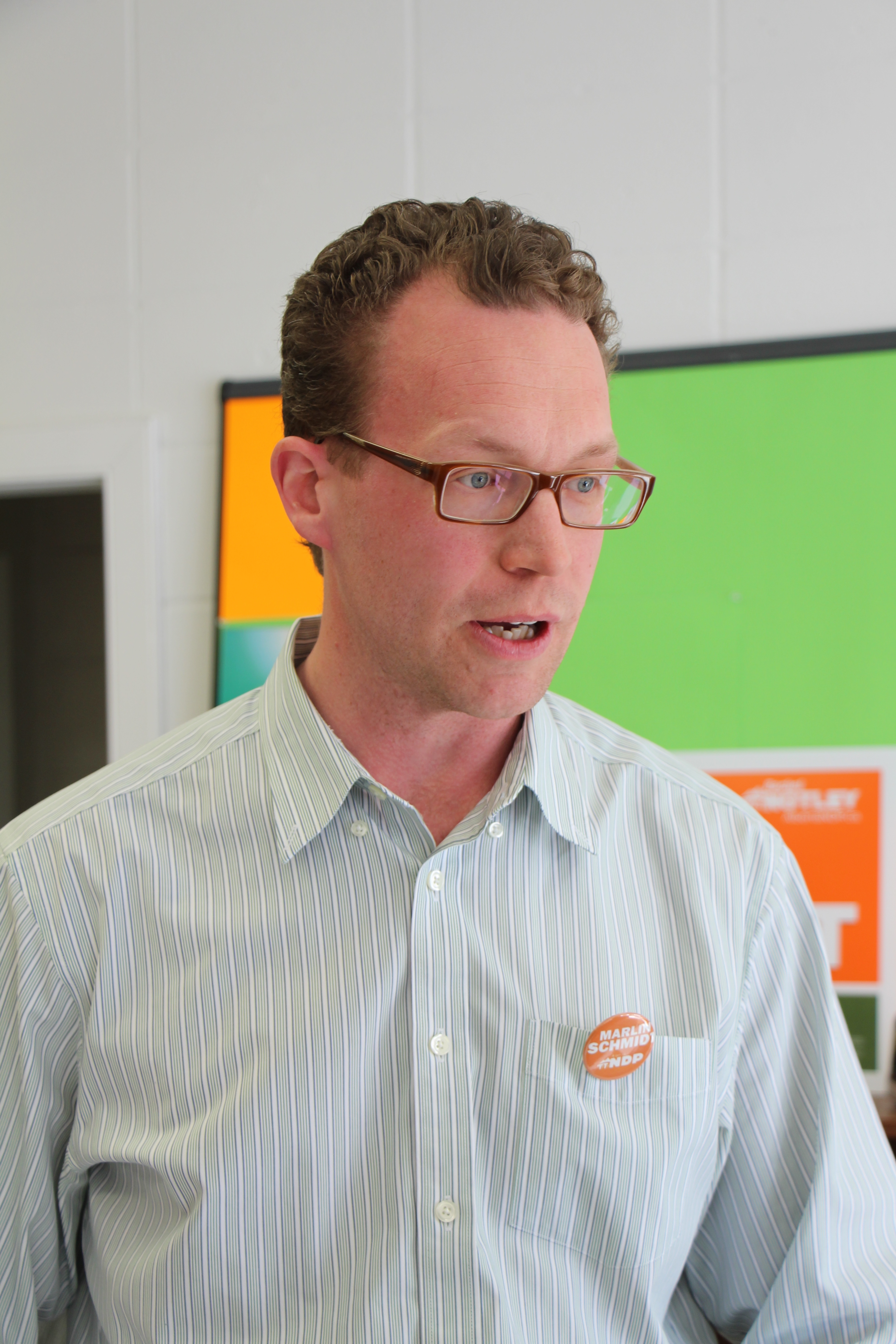

Alberta Minister of Advanced Education
- In office 2 February 2016 – 30 April 2019
- Premier: Rachel Notley
- Preceded by: Lori Sigurdson
- Succeeded by: Demetrios Nicolaides

Member of the Legislative Assembly of Alberta for Edmonton-Gold Bar
- Incumbent
- Assumed office 5 May 2015
- Preceded by: David Dorward

Personal details
- Born: 16 October 1978 (age 48) Edmonton, Alberta, Canada
- Party: Alberta New Democratic Party
- Occupation: Hydrogeologist

Marlin Schmidt ECA MLA (born 16 October 1978) is a Canadian politician who currently represents the electoral district of Edmonton-Gold Bar in the Legislative Assembly of Alberta. First elected in the 2015 Alberta general election, Schmidt served as the Minister of Advanced Education in the New Democratic Party (NDP) government led by Rachel Notley.

Prior to serving with the Legislative Assembly, Schmidt specialized in site remediation for over a decade. From 2008 to 2015 he worked for Alberta Environment as a soil and groundwater contamination specialist, and previous to this, he worked as a remediation specialist, beginning in 2002. He holds a master of science degree in applied environmental geosciences from University of Tübingen in Germany and a bachelor of science from Queen's University in Kingston.

Schmidt drew criticism in July 2020 for comments he made in the Legislature about the late British Prime Minister Margaret Thatcher. His remarks were in opposition to a bill proposed by the governing United Conservative Party that modified the province's referendum laws, which Schmidt said Thatcher would have opposed. Schmidt went on to say that he "count[s] on enjoying the fact that Margaret Thatcher is still dead" and regretted she had died "probably 30 years too late". The comments were deemed "totally inappropriate," by the Speaker of the Legislature, which prompted Schmidt to withdraw his comments and apologize.

On 15 June 2026, Schmidt announced that he would not be standing for re-election in the 32nd Alberta general election.

== Electoral history ==
=== 2023 general election ===
2023 Alberta general election: Edmonton-Gold Bar
Party	Candidate	Votes	%	±%
New Democratic	Marlin Schmidt	15,508	69.48	+10.00
United Conservative	Miles Berry	6,174	27.66	-1.64
Independent	Graham Lettner	321	1.44	–
Green	Ernestina Malheiro	316	1.42	+0.41
Total		22,319	99.36	–
Rejected and declined		144	0.64	
Turnout		22,463	63.31	
Eligible voters		35,481		
New Democratic hold		Swing		+5.82
Source(s) Source: Elections Alberta

=== 2019 general election ===
2019 Alberta general election: Edmonton-Gold Bar
Party	Candidate	Votes	%	±%
New Democratic	Marlin Schmidt	14,562	59.48%	-9.40%
United Conservative	David C. Dorward	7,174	29.30%	+4.31%
Alberta Party	Diana Ly	2,008	8.20%	5.23%
Liberal	Steve Kochan	315	1.29%	-1.86%
Green	Tanya Herbert	247	1.01%	–
Alberta Independence	Vincent Loyer	176	0.72%	–
Total		24,482	–	–
Rejected, spoiled and declined		27	64	16
Eligible electors / turnout		35,555	68.98%	7.94%
New Democratic hold		Swing		-10.05%
Source(s) Source: "33 - Edmonton-Gold Bar, 2019 Alberta general election". officialresults.elections.ab.ca. Elections Alberta.

=== 2015 general election ===
2015 Alberta general election: Edmonton-Gold Bar
Party	Candidate	Votes	%	±%
New Democratic	Marlin Schmidt	15,349	68.89%	40.17%
Progressive Conservative	David C. Dorward	4,147	18.61%	-14.35%
Wildrose	Justin J. James	1,422	6.38%	-9.21%
Liberal	Ronald Brochu	702	3.15%	-16.91%
Alberta Party	Cristina Stasia	662	2.97%	1.27%
Total		22,282	–	–
Rejected, spoiled and declined		96	25	16
Eligible electors / turnout		36,688	61.04%	-1.25%
New Democratic gain from Progressive Conservative		Swing		23.01%
Source(s) Source: "35 - Edmonton-Gold Bar, 2015 Alberta general election". officialresults.elections.ab.ca. Elections Alberta.

=== 2012 general election ===
2012 Alberta general election: Edmonton-Gold Bar
Party	Candidate	Votes	%	±%
Progressive Conservative	David C. Dorward	6,701	32.97%	-4.64%
New Democratic	Marlin Schmidt	5,836	28.71%	14.96%
Liberal	Josipa Petrunic	4,078	20.06%	-24.83%
Wildrose Alliance	Linda Carlson	3,169	15.59%	–
Alberta Party	Dennis O'Neill	345	1.70%	–
Evergreen	David J. Parker	198	0.97%	–
Total		20,327	–	–
Rejected, spoiled and declined		144	18	1
Eligible electors / turnout		32,868	62.29%	14.43%
Progressive Conservative gain from Liberal		Swing		-1.51%
Source(s) Source: "35 - Edmonton-Gold Bar, 2012 Alberta general election". officialresults.elections.ab.ca. Elections Alberta.
