= David J. Parker =

Canadian politician

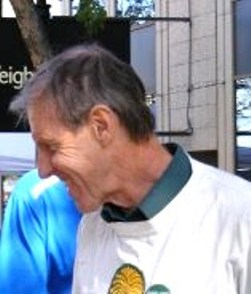
Parker campaigning during the 2008 federal election

David James Parker (born 1947) is a politician from Alberta, Canada. He was the leader of the Alberta Greens from 1996 to 2001. He has also been a perennial candidate running in federal and provincial elections.

== Political career ==
Parker first ran for a seat in the Legislative Assembly of Alberta in the 1993 Alberta general election. He ran in the electoral district of Edmonton-Gold Bar. He was defeated finishing second last in a field of six candidates. Liberal incumbent Bettie Hewes won the electoral district with a landslide majority.

Parker became leader of the Alberta Greens in 1996. As leader of the party he ran for office in the 1997 Alberta general election in Gold Bar for the second time. He was easily defeated by Hugh MacDonald losing some of his previous votes and finishing second last with 97 votes. He finished just ahead of Natural Law leader Maury Shapka. Parker stepped down as leader in 2001.

Parker ran for a seat in the House of Commons of Canada in the 2004 Canadian federal election in Edmonton Centre for the federal Greens. He won almost 5% of the popular vote finishing fourth. A few months later Parker ran in the provincial Edmonton Centre electoral district in the 2004 Alberta general election. He won fourth place well behind incumbent Laurie Blakeman. He ran again in Edmonton Centre two years later in the 2006 Canadian federal election this time marginally increasing his popular vote but still finishing a distant fourth place. Parker most recently ran for a second time in the provincial Edmonton Centre electoral district in the 2008 Alberta general election again finishing a distant fourth.

In the 2008 federal election, he placed fourth in the Edmonton Centre riding.

== Electoral history ==
2012 Alberta general election: Edmonton-Gold Bar
Party	Candidate	Votes	%	±%
Progressive Conservative	David C. Dorward	6,701	32.97%	-4.64%
New Democratic	Marlin Schmidt	5,836	28.71%	14.96%
Liberal	Josipa Petrunic	4,078	20.06%	-24.83%
Wildrose Alliance	Linda Carlson	3,169	15.59%	–
Alberta Party	Dennis O'Neill	345	1.70%	–
Evergreen	David J. Parker	198	0.97%	–
Total		20,327	–	–
Rejected, spoiled and declined		144	18	1
Eligible electors / turnout		32,868	62.29%	14.43%
Progressive Conservative gain from Liberal		Swing		-1.51%
Source(s) Source: "35 - Edmonton-Gold Bar, 2012 Alberta general election". officialresults.elections.ab.ca. Elections Alberta.

Party political offices
Preceded by Betty Paschen	Leader of the Alberta Greens; 1996-2001	Succeeded by George Read
