= Edmonton-Centre =

Defunct provincial electoral district in Alberta, Canada

Coordinates: 53.54°N 113.56°W

Alberta electoral district
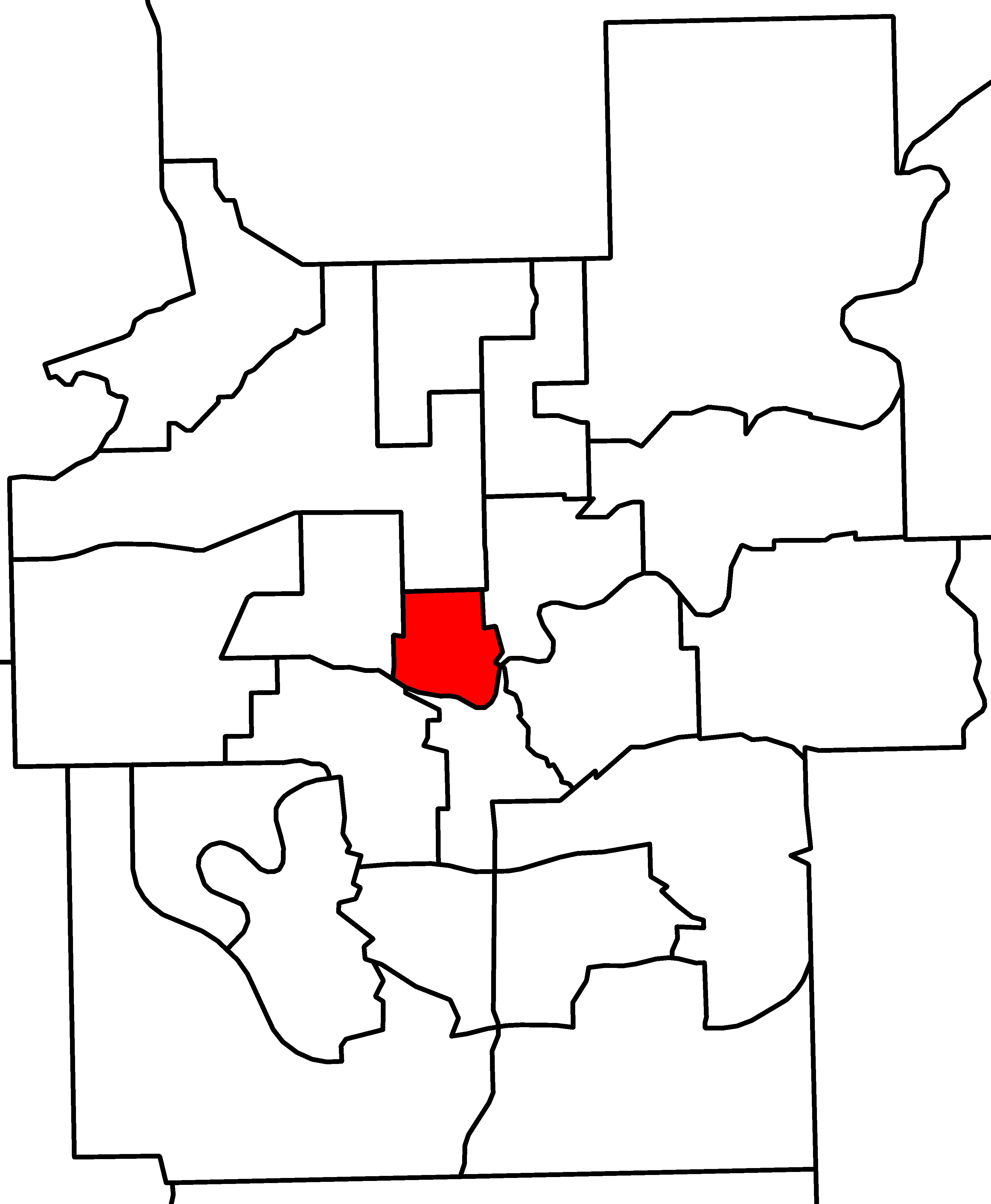
- 2010 boundaries

Defunct provincial electoral district
- Legislature: Legislative Assembly of Alberta
- District created: 1957
- District abolished: 2019
- First contested: 1959
- Last contested: 2015

Edmonton-Centre (styled Edmonton Centre from 1959 to 1971) was a provincial electoral district in Alberta, Canada, mandated to return a single member to the Legislative Assembly of Alberta using the first past the post method of voting from 1959 to 2019.

== History ==
The electoral district of Edmonton-Centre was created in the 1957 boundary redistribution that saw the ridings of Edmonton and Calgary broken up into single member electoral districts when the province reintroduced first past the post.

The 2010 electoral boundary re-distribution kept the riding mostly the same as 2003 except for a realignment on the eastern boundary where it was pushed back to 104 Street instead of completely running along 97 Street like it did before the change.

=== Boundary history ===
28 Edmonton-Centre 2003 boundaries
Bordering districts
North	East	West	South
Edmonton-Calder	Edmonton-Highlands-Norwood, Edmonton-Gold Bar	Edmonton-Glenora	Edmonton-Riverview, Edmonton-Strathcona
riding map goes here		map in relation to other districts in Alberta goes here	
Legal description from Electoral Divisions Act, S.A. 2003, c. E-4.1
Starting at the intersection of 111 Avenue with the northerly extension of 121 Street; then 1. east along 111 Avenue to 97 Street; 2. southeast along 97 Street and its extension to the right bank of the North Saskatchewan River; 3. in a south westerly direction along the right bank to Groat Road Bridge; 4. northeast across Groat Road Bridge to Victoria Park Road; 5. northeasterly along Victoria Park Road to the southerly extension of 124 Street; 6. north along the extension and 124 Street to Stony Plain Road; 7. southeast along Stony Plain Road to 121 Street; 8. north along 121 Street and its northerly extension to the starting point.
Note:

31 Edmonton-Centre 2010 boundaries
Bordering districts
North	East	West	South
Edmonton-Calder	Edmonton-Gold Bar and Edmonton-Highlands-Norwood	Edmonton-Glenora	Edmonton-Riverview and Edmonton-Strathcona
Legal description from the Statutes of Alberta 2010, Electoral Divisions Act.

=== Electoral history ===
Members of the Legislative Assembly for Edmonton-Centre
Assembly	Years	Member	Party
See Edmonton 1921-1959
14th	1959–1963	Ambrose Holowach	Social Credit
15th	1963–1967	Ambrose Holowach	Social Credit
16th	1967–1971	Ambrose Holowach	Social Credit
17th	1971–1975	Gordon Miniely	Progressive; Conservative
18th	1975–1979	Gordon Miniely	Progressive; Conservative
19th	1979–1982	Mary LeMessurier	Progressive; Conservative
20th	1982–1986	Mary LeMessurier	Progressive; Conservative
21st	1986–1989	William Roberts	New Democrat
22nd	1989–1993	William Roberts	New Democrat
23rd	1993–1997	Michael Henry	Liberal
24th	1997–2001	Laurie Blakeman	Liberal
25th	2001–2004	Laurie Blakeman	Liberal
26th	2004–2008	Laurie Blakeman	Liberal
27th	2008–2012	Laurie Blakeman	Liberal
28th	2012–2015	Laurie Blakeman	Liberal
29th	2015–2019	David Shepherd	New Democrat
See Edmonton-City Centre after 2019

The electoral district of Edmonton-Centre is currently the oldest continuous active provincial electoral district in the city of Edmonton. It has a long history going back to 1959 when the single transferable vote super districts of Edmonton and Calgary were abolished in favour of single member districts.

Over the years, candidates from four different parties have been elected in the district without being able to return after being defeated. From 1959 to 1986 the riding returned MLA's sitting with governing parties in Alberta while the later years past 1986 MLAs have been returned from the official opposition.

The first elected MLA was Social Credit candidate Ambrose Holowach who had previously served as a Member of Parliament sitting with the federal wing of Social Credit from 1953 to 1958. Holowach was re-elected twice more and served a ministerial portfolio as Provincial Secretary in the governments of Ernest Manning and Harry Strom from 1962 to 1971.

The 1971 election would bring great change to the province and to Edmonton-Centre. Holowach did not run for re-election and the riding was won by Progressive Conservative candidate Gordon Miniely. His party would form government for the first time that year and Miniely would serve in the Peter Lougheed cabinet until he retired from office after his second term in 1979.

Mary LeMessurier would be the third elected representative of the riding. First elected in 1979 she would also be appointed to cabinet like her two predecessors before her. She served as Minister of Culture in the Lougheed government and kept her portfolio briefly after Don Getty became Premier in 1985. She would run for re-election in 1986 but face a stunning defeat by NDP candidate William Roberts.

The NDP party would form the official opposition after electing a record size caucus in 1986. Roberts held his office for two terms before retiring in 1993. That election saw the NDP vote collapse in the district and across the province with NDP candidate Kay Hurtig finishing third place.

After the NDP defeat from opposition in 1993 and the surge of the Liberal party under Laurence Decore the district became a Liberal stronghold, with Michael Henry becoming the first MLA for his party. Henry did not run a second term in office in the 1997 election. The new Liberal candidate was Laurie Blakeman who held the district with a reduced majority.

In the 2015 Alberta General Election NDP Candidate David Shepherd was elected with 54% of the vote.

== Legislative election results ==
=== 1959 ===
1959 Alberta general election
Party	Candidate	Votes	%	±%
Social Credit	Ambrose Holowach	3,912	46.74%	–
Progressive Conservative	Gerard Amerongen	2,185	26.11%	–
Liberal	Laurette Douglas	1,684	20.12%	–
Co-operative Commonwealth	Robert Atkin	589	7.04%	–
Total		8,370	–	–
Rejected, spoiled and declined		38	–	–
Eligible electors / turnout		15,357	54.75%	–
Social Credit pickup new district.				
Source(s) Source: "Edmonton-Centre Official Results 1959 Alberta general election". Alberta Heritage Community Foundation.

=== 1963 ===
1963 Alberta general election
Party	Candidate	Votes	%	±%
Social Credit	Ambrose Holowach	3,378	47.70%	0.96%
Progressive Conservative	Gerard Amerongen	1,492	21.07%	-5.04%
Liberal	Joseph A. Tannous	1,219	17.21%	-2.91%
New Democratic	Alex Szchechina	993	14.02%	6.98%
Total		7,082	–	–
Rejected, spoiled and declined		21	–	–
Eligible electors / turnout		15,211	46.70%	-8.05%
Social Credit hold		Swing		3.00%
Source(s) Source: "Edmonton-Centre Official Results 1963 Alberta general election". Alberta Heritage Community Foundation.

=== 1967 ===
1967 Alberta general election
Party	Candidate	Votes	%	±%
Social Credit	Ambrose Holowach	3,146	39.53%	-8.17%
Progressive Conservative	Harold W. Veale	2,558	32.14%	11.08%
New Democratic	Henry Tomaschuk	1,313	16.50%	2.48%
Liberal	Joseph A. Tannous	747	9.39%	-7.83%
Independent	G.A. (Pat) O'Hara	194	2.44%	–
Total		7,958	–	–
Rejected, spoiled and declined		83	–	–
Eligible electors / turnout		15,904	50.56%	3.86%
Social Credit hold		Swing		-9.62%
Source(s) Source: "Edmonton-Centre Official Results 1967 Alberta general election". Alberta Heritage Community Foundation.

=== 1971 ===
1971 Alberta general election
Party	Candidate	Votes	%	±%
Progressive Conservative	Gordon Miniely	5,281	58.48%	26.33%
Social Credit	Gerry Mulhall	2,622	29.03%	-10.50%
New Democratic	Linda Gaboury	931	10.31%	-6.19%
Liberal	Leonard Stahl	197	2.18%	-7.21%
Total		9,031	–	–
Rejected, spoiled and declined		38	–	–
Eligible electors / turnout		13,008	69.72%	19.16%
Progressive Conservative gain from Social Credit		Swing		11.03%
Source(s) Source: "Edmonton-Centre Official Results 1971 Alberta general election". Alberta Heritage Community Foundation.

=== 1975 ===
1975 Alberta general election
Party	Candidate	Votes	%	±%
Progressive Conservative	Gordon Miniely	3,996	62.08%	3.60%
New Democratic	Barry Roberts	1,125	17.48%	7.17%
Liberal	Ed Molstad	930	14.45%	12.27%
Social Credit	Gerry Beck	386	6.00%	-23.04%
Total		6,437	–	–
Rejected, spoiled and declined		30	–	–
Eligible electors / turnout		13,645	47.39%	-22.32%
Progressive Conservative hold		Swing		7.58%
Source(s) Source: "Edmonton-Centre Official Results 1975 Alberta general election". Alberta Heritage Community Foundation.

=== 1979 ===
1979 Alberta general election
Party	Candidate	Votes	%	±%
Progressive Conservative	Mary LeMessurier	4,550	54.39%	-7.69%
New Democratic	Harry Cassidy Midgley	2,273	27.17%	9.70%
Social Credit	Robert J. (Bob) Dunseith	838	10.02%	4.02%
Liberal	Leonard Stahl	704	8.42%	-6.03%
Total		8,365	–	–
Rejected, spoiled and declined		32	–	–
Eligible electors / turnout		17,665	47.53%	0.14%
Progressive Conservative hold		Swing		-8.69%
Source(s) Source: "Edmonton-Centre Official Results 1979 Alberta general election". Alberta Heritage Community Foundation.

=== 1982 ===
1982 Alberta general election
Party	Candidate	Votes	%	±%
Progressive Conservative	Mary LeMessurier	5,414	49.90%	-4.49%
New Democratic	Iain Taylor	3,578	32.98%	5.80%
Liberal	Brian McKercher	849	7.82%	-0.59%
Western Canada Concept	Larry McIlroy	812	7.48%	–
Social Credit	Lawlor J. McKenna	197	1.82%	-8.20%
Total		10,850	–	–
Rejected, spoiled and declined		39	–	–
Eligible electors / turnout		17,701	61.52%	13.98%
Progressive Conservative hold		Swing		-5.15%
Source(s) Source: "Edmonton-Centre Official Results 1982 Alberta general election". Alberta Heritage Community Foundation.

=== 1986 ===
1986 Alberta general election
Party	Candidate	Votes	%	±%
New Democratic	William Roberts	3,976	42.03%	9.05%
Progressive Conservative	Mary LeMessurier	3,816	40.33%	-9.56%
Liberal	Douglas Haydock	1,384	14.63%	6.80%
Western Canada Concept	Fred Marshall	182	1.92%	-5.56%
Independent	Leonard Stahl	103	1.09%	–
Total		9,461	–	–
Rejected, spoiled and declined		30	–	–
Eligible electors / turnout		20,144	47.12%	-14.40%
New Democratic gain from Progressive Conservative		Swing		-7.62%
Source(s) Source: "Edmonton-Centre Official Results 1986 Alberta general election". Alberta Heritage Community Foundation.

=== 1989 ===
1989 Alberta general election
Party	Candidate	Votes	%	±%
New Democratic	William Roberts	4,440	41.88%	-0.14%
Progressive Conservative	Don Clarke	3,217	30.35%	-9.99%
Liberal	Mary Molloy	2,821	26.61%	11.98%
Independent	Carol Pylypow	72	0.68%	-0.41%
Independent	Leonard Stahl	51	0.48%	-0.61%
Total		10,601	–	–
Rejected, spoiled and declined		21	–	–
Eligible electors / turnout		20,344	52.21%	5.10%
New Democratic hold		Swing		4.92%
Source(s) Source: "Edmonton-Centre Official Results 1989 Alberta general election". Alberta Heritage Community Foundation.

=== 1993 ===
1993 Alberta general election
Party	Candidate	Votes	%	±%
Liberal	Michael Henry	5,656	47.59%	20.98%
Progressive Conservative	John Wheelwright	3,418	28.76%	-1.59%
New Democratic	Kay Hurtig	2,343	19.71%	-22.17%
Social Credit	Wes Warren	202	1.70%	–
Natural Law	Ric Johnsen	95	0.80%	–
Independent	Clayton Leigh Van Horne	83	0.70%	–
Independent	John R. Lakusta	48	0.40%	–
Independent	Carol Lena Pylypow	40	0.34%	–
Total		11,885	–	–
Rejected, spoiled, and declined		41	–	–
Eligible electors / turnout		22,308	53.46%	1.25%
Liberal gain from New Democratic		Swing		3.65%
Source(s) Source: "Edmonton-Centre Official Results 1993 Alberta general election". Alberta Heritage Community Foundation.

=== 1997 ===
1997 Alberta general election
Party	Candidate	Votes	%	±%
Liberal	Laurie Blakeman	4,769	43.96%	-3.63%
Progressive Conservative	Don Weideman	3,634	33.50%	4.74%
New Democratic	Jenn Smith	1,845	17.01%	-2.71%
Social Credit	Alan Cruikshank	420	3.87%	2.17%
Forum	Emil van der Poorten	98	0.90%	–
Natural Law	Richard Johnsen	83	0.77%	-0.03%
Total		10,849	–	–
Rejected, spoiled and declined		43	–	–
Eligible electors / turnout		20,907	52.10%	-1.36%
Liberal hold		Swing		-4.18%
Source(s) Source: "Edmonton-Centre Official Results 1997 Alberta general election". Alberta Heritage Community Foundation.

=== 2001 ===
2001 Alberta general election
Party	Candidate	Votes	%	±%
Liberal	Laurie Blakeman	5,095	44.01%	0.06%
Progressive Conservative	Don J. Weideman	4,446	38.41%	4.91%
New Democratic	David Eggen	1,959	16.92%	-0.08%
Communist	Naomi Rankin	76	0.66%	–
Total		11,576	–	–
Rejected, spoiled, and declined		74	–	–
Eligible electors / turnout		22,648	51.44%	-0.66%
Liberal hold		Swing		-2.43%
Source(s) Source: "Edmonton-Centre Official Results 2001 Alberta general election". Alberta Heritage Community Foundation.

=== 2004 ===
2004 Alberta general election
Party	Candidate	Votes	%	±%
Liberal	Laurie Blakeman	6,203	57.07%	13.06%
Progressive Conservative	Don Weideman	2,622	24.12%	-14.28%
New Democratic	Mary Elizabeth Archer	1,319	12.14%	-4.79%
Greens	David J. Parker	333	3.06%	–
Alberta Alliance	Tony Caterina	280	2.58%	–
Social Credit	Linda Clements	112	1.03%	–
Total		10,869	–	–
Rejected, spoiled and declined		81	–	–
Eligible electors / turnout		22,362	48.97%	-2.47%
Liberal hold		Swing		13.67%
Source(s) Source: "Edmonton-Centre Official Results 2004 Alberta general election". Alberta Heritage Community Foundation.

=== 2008 ===
2008 Alberta general election
Party	Candidate	Votes	%	±%
Liberal	Laurie Blakeman	5,042	44.98%	-12.09%
Progressive Conservative	Bill Donahue	3,291	29.36%	5.23%
New Democratic	Deron Bilous	2,163	19.30%	7.16%
Green	David J. Parker	472	4.21%	–
Wildrose Alliance	James Iverson	200	1.78%	–
Alberta Party	Margaret Saunter	42	0.37%	–
Total		11,210	–	–
Rejected, spoiled and declined		78	–	–
Eligible electors / turnout		30,335	37.21%	-11.76%
Liberal hold		Swing		-8.66%
Source(s) Source: "Elections Alberta 2008 General Election". Elections Alberta.

=== 2012 ===
2012 Alberta general election
Party	Candidate	Votes	%	±%
Liberal	Laurie Blakeman	5,626	40.37%	-4.61%
Progressive Conservative	Akash Khokhar	4,296	30.82%	1.47%
New Democratic	Nadine Bailey	2,257	16.19%	-3.10%
Wildrose	Barb de Groot	1,758	12.61%	10.83%
Total		13,937	–	–
Rejected, spoiled and declined		102	–	–
Eligible electors / turnout		28,358	49.51%	12.30%
Liberal hold		Swing		-3.04%
Source(s) Source: "Elections Alberta 2012 General Election". Elections Alberta.

=== 2015 ===
2015 Alberta general election
Party	Candidate	Votes	%	±%
New Democratic	David Shepherd	8,983	54.39%	38.19%
Liberal	Laurie Blakeman	4,199	25.42%	-14.95%
Progressive Conservative	Catherine Keill	2,228	13.49%	-17.34%
Wildrose	Joe Byram	772	4.67%	-7.94%
Independent	Greg Keating	295	1.79%	–
Independent	Rory Joe Koopmans	40	0.24%	–
Total		16,517	–	–
Rejected, spoiled and declined		64	–	–
Eligible electors / turnout		34,976	47.41%	-2.10%
New Democratic gain from Liberal		Swing		9.71%
Source(s) Source: "Elections Alberta 2015 General Election". Elections Alberta.

== Senate nominee election results ==
=== 2004 ===
2004 Senate nominee election results: Edmonton-Centre				Turnout 48.64%	
Affiliation	Candidate	Votes	% votes	% ballots	Rank
Progressive Conservative	Betty Unger	3,325	15.69%	44.45%	2
Independent	Link Byfield	3,211	15.15%	42.92%	4
Independent	Tom Sindlinger	2,520	11.89%	33.69%	9
Progressive Conservative	Bert Brown	2,304	10.87%	30.80%	1
Progressive Conservative	Cliff Breitkreuz	2,004	9.46%	26.79%	3
Alberta Alliance	Michael Roth	1,759	8.30%	23.51%	7
Progressive Conservative	David Usherwood	1,646	7.77%	22.00%	6
Alberta Alliance	Vance Gough	1,515	7.15%	20.25%	8
Alberta Alliance	Gary Horan	1,502	7.09%	20.08%	10
Progressive Conservative	Jim Silye	1,406	6.63%	18.79%	5
Total votes		21,192	100%		
Total ballots		7,481	2.83 votes per ballot		
Rejected, spoiled and declined		3,395			

Voters had the option of selecting four candidates on the ballot

== Student vote results ==
=== 2004 ===
Participating schools
Centre High School
Oliver School
Victoria School of Performing and Visual Arts

On November 19, 2004, a student vote was conducted at participating Alberta schools to parallel the 2004 Alberta general election results. The vote was designed to educate students and simulate the electoral process for persons who have not yet reached the legal majority. The vote was conducted in 80 of the 83 provincial electoral districts with students voting for actual election candidates. Schools with a large student body that reside in another electoral district had the option to vote for candidates outside of the electoral district then where they were physically located.

2004 Alberta student vote results
Affiliation	Candidate	Votes	%
NDP	Mary Elizabeth Archer	218	37.65%
Liberal	Laurie Blakeman	152	26.25%
Green	David Parker	103	17.79%
Progressive Conservative	Don Weideman	66	11.40%
Alberta Alliance	Tony Caterina	22	3.80%
Social Credit	Linda Clements	18	3.11%
Total		579	100%
Rejected, spoiled and declined		10	

=== 2012 ===
2012 Alberta student vote results
Affiliation	Candidate	Votes	%
Progressive Conservative	Akash Khokhar		%
Wildrose	Barb de Groot		
Liberal	Laurie Blakeman		%
NDP	Nadine Bailey		%
Total			100%

== See also ==
- List of Alberta provincial electoral districts
- Canadian provincial electoral districts
- Edmonton Centre, a federal electoral district in Alberta, Canada
