= Edmonton-Riverview =

Provincial electoral district in Alberta, Canada

Alberta electoral district
- Edmonton-Riverview within the City of Edmonton, 2017 boundaries

Provincial electoral district
- Legislature: Legislative Assembly of Alberta
MLA
Lori Sigurdson
New Democratic
- District created: 1996
- First contested: 1997
- Last contested: 2023

Edmonton Riverview is a provincial electoral district in Alberta, Canada. The district is mandated to return a single member to the Legislative Assembly of Alberta using the first past the post method of voting. Created in the 1997 boundary redistribution, the district includes re-distributed areas of the Edmonton-Glenora, Edmonton-Strathcona, and Edmonton-Whitemud.

Neighbourhoods in this riding include: Windsor Park, Belgravia, Parkallen, Crestwood, Laurier Heights, and Parkview. Edmonton-Riverview remains one of the more affluent ridings in Edmonton, featuring some of the city's most expensive real estate.

The riding is currently represented by New Democrat Lori Sigurdson.

== History ==
The electoral district was created in the 1996 boundary redistribution out of parts of Edmonton-Glenora and Edmonton-Strathcona. The 2010 boundary redistribution saw the riding change on its western boundary with the boundary between Whitemud Drive and 87 Avenue moving west to run along 170 Street, in land that was part of Edmonton-Meadowlark. The northeast corner of the riding was also revised to have the boundary move along the right bank instead of the left bank of the North Saskatchewan River.

=== Boundary history ===
39 Edmonton-Riverview 2003 boundaries
Bordering districts
North	East	West	South
Edmonton-Centre, Edmonton-Glenora	Edmonton-Strathcona	Edmonton-Meadowlark	Edmonton-McClung, Edmonton-Rutherford, Edmonton-Whitemud
riding map goes here			
Legal description from the Statutes of Alberta 2003, Electoral Divisions Act
Starting at the intersection of 156 Street with Stony Plain Road; then 1. east along Stony Plain Road to MacKinnon Ravine at 148 Street; 2. southeast along MacKinnon Ravine to the left bank of the North Saskatchewan River; 3. east along the left bank of the North Saskatchewan River to Groat Road Bridge; 4. southwest across Groat Road Bridge to the right bank of the North Saskatchewan River; 5. generally east along the right bank of the North Saskatchewan River to the northerly extension of 111 Street; 6. south along the extension and 111 Street to 87 Avenue; 7. west along 87 Avenue to 112 Street; 8. south along 112 Street to University Avenue; 9. southeast along University Avenue to 109 Street; 10. south along 109 Street to 61 Avenue; 11. west along 61 Avenue to the centre line of 111 Street; 12. south along the centre line of 111 Street to Whitemud Drive; 13. west along Whitemud Drive to Whitemud Creek; 14. north along Whitemud Creek to Fox Drive; 15. west along Fox Drive to Whitemud Drive; 16. north and west along Whitemud Drive to 159 Street; 17. north along 159 Street to 87 Avenue; 18. west along 87 Avenue to 163 Street; 19. north along 163 Street to 95 Avenue; 20. east along 95 Avenue to 156 Street; 21. north along 156 Street to the starting point.
Note:

42 Edmonton-Riverview 2010 boundaries
Bordering districts
North	East	West	South
Edmonton-Centre and Edmonton-Glenora	Edmonton-Strathcona	Edmonton-Meadowlark, Edmonton-McClung and Edmonton-Whitemud	Edmonton-Rutherford
Legal description from the Statutes of Alberta 2010, Electoral Divisions Act

=== Electoral history ===
Members of the Legislative Assembly for Edmonton-Riverview
Assembly	Years	Member	Party
See Edmonton-Glenora 1971-1997 and Edmonton-Strathcona 1971-1997
24th	1997-2001	Linda Sloan	Liberal
25th	2001-2004	Kevin Taft	Liberal
26th	2004-2008	Kevin Taft	Liberal
27th	2008–2012	Kevin Taft	Liberal
28th	2012–2015	Steve Young	Progressive Conservative
29th	2015–2019	Lori Sigurdson	New Democratic
30th	2019–2023	Lori Sigurdson	New Democratic
31st	2023–	Lori Sigurdson	New Democratic

The first election held in 1997 saw Liberal candidate Linda Sloan elected as the first representative. Sloan defeated Progressive Conservative candidate Gwen Harris by over 900 votes. Sloan declined to seek a second term.

The 2001 election saw Liberal candidate and best-selling author Kevin Taft run against Progressive Conservative candidate and former Edmonton City Councilor Wendy Kinsella. Taft won almost half the popular vote earning 49% in the race.

Taft would later become leader of the Alberta Liberals he stood for a second term in office in the 2004 election. Taft easily defeated Progressive Conservative candidate and future MLA Fred Horne taking almost 65% of the vote.

He was re-elected again in 2008 and resigned his leadership position after the Progressive Conservatives made big gains at the Liberals expense throughout the province.

== Legislative election results ==
=== Elections in the 1990s ===
1997 Alberta general election
Party	Candidate	Votes	%
Liberal	Linda Sloan	6,066	42.12
Progressive Conservative	Gwen Harris	5,122	35.57
New Democratic	Donna Fong	2,261	15.70
Social Credit	David Prenoslo	805	5.59
Communist	Naomi Rankin	61	0.42
Total valid votes		14,402	
Rejected, spoiled and declined		56	
Registered electors		23,040	
Turnout		14,458	62.75
Liberal pickup new district.			
Source(s) "1997 General Election". Elections Alberta. Archived from the original on February 14, 2012.

=== Elections in the 2000s ===
2001 Alberta general election
Party	Candidate	Votes	%	±%
Liberal	Kevin Taft	7,420	49.68	+7.56
Progressive Conservative	Wendy Kinsella	5,883	39.39	+3.82
New Democratic	Doug McLachlan	1,469	9.83	-5.87
Greens	Jerry Paschen	165	1.10	
Total valid votes		14,937		
Rejected, spoiled and declined		56		
Registered electors		23,208		
Turnout		14,993	64.20	+1.45
Liberal hold		Swing		+1.87
Source(s) "2001 Statement of Official results Edmonton-Riverview" (PDF). Elections Alberta.

2004 Alberta general election
Party	Candidate	Votes	%	±%
Liberal	Kevin Taft	10,280	65.48	+15.80
Progressive Conservative	Fred Horne	3,575	22.77	-16.62
New Democratic	Donna Martyn	1,058	6.74	-3.09
Greens	John Lackey	357	2.27	+1.17
Alberta Alliance	David Edgar	313	1.99	
Social Credit	David Power	116	0.75	
Total valid votes		15,699		
Rejected, spoiled and declined		91		
Registered electors		25,060		
Turnout		15,790	63.01	-1.19
Liberal hold		Swing		+16.21
Source(s) "Edmonton-Riverview Statement of Official Results 2004 Alberta general election" (PDF). Elections Alberta.

2008 Alberta general election
Party	Candidate	Votes	%	±%
Liberal	Kevin Taft	7,471	50.61	−14.87
Progressive Conservative	Wendy Andrews	5,171	35.03	+12.26
New Democratic	Erica Bullwinkle	1,284	8.70	+1.96
Greens	Cameron Wakefield	506	3.43	+1.16
Wildrose Alliance	Kyle Van Hauwaert	329	2.23	+0.24
Total		14,761		
Rejected, spoiled and declined		36		
Eligible electors		31,130		
Turnout		14,797	47.53	-15.48
Liberal hold		Swing		−13.57
Source(s) The Report on the March 3, 2008 Provincial General Election of the Twenty-seventh Legislative Assembly. Elections Alberta. July 28, 2008. pp. 328–331.

=== Elections in the 2010s ===
2012 Alberta general election
Party	Candidate	Votes	%	±%
Progressive Conservative	Steve Young	7,288	39.59	+4.56
Liberal	Arif Khan	4,202	22.83	-27.78
New Democratic	Lori Sigurdson	3,892	21.14	+12.44
Wildrose	John Corie	2,721	14.78	+12.55
Alberta Party	Timothy Wong	306	1.66	
Total valid votes		18,409		
Rejected, spoiled, and declined		203		
Registered electors		28,975		
Turnout		18,612	64.23	+16.70
Progressive Conservative gain from Liberal		Swing		+16.17
Source(s) Elections Alberta. "Electoral Division Results: Edmonton-Riverview".

2015 Alberta general election
Party	Candidate	Votes	%	±%
New Democratic	Lori Sigurdson	12,108	62.78	+41.64
Progressive Conservative	Steve Young	3,732	19.35	-20.24
Liberal	Donna Wilson	1,416	7.34	-15.49
Wildrose	Ian Crawford	1,350	7.00	-7.78
Alberta Party	Brandon Beringer	487	2.53	+0.87
Green	Sandra Lange	135	0.70	
Independent	Glenn Miller	59	0.31	
Total valid votes		19,287		
Rejected, spoiled, and declined		128		
Registered electors		31,416		
Turnout		19,415	61.80	-2.43
New Democratic gain from Progressive Conservative		Swing		+30.94
Source(s) Elections Alberta. "Electoral Division Results: Edmonton-Riverview".

2019 Alberta general election
Party	Candidate	Votes	%	±%
New Democratic	Lori Sigurdson	12,234	55.9%	-6.88%
United Conservative	Kara Barker	6,508	29.8%	+3.45%
Alberta Party	Katherine O'Neill	2,503	11.4%	+8.87%
Liberal	Indy Randhawa	299	1.4%	-5.94%
Independence	Corey MacFadden	190	0.9%	--
Independent	Rob Bernshaw	135	0.6%	--
Total valid votes		21,869		
Rejected, spoiled and declined		58	70	11
Registered electors and turnout		33,012	66.5%	
New Democratic hold		Swing		
Source(s) "2019 Provincial General Election Results". Elections Alberta.

=== 2023 ===
2023 Alberta general election
Party	Candidate	Votes	%	±%
New Democratic	Lori Sigurdson	12,875	67.06	+11.12
United Conservative	Terry Vankka	5,564	28.98	-0.78
Liberal	Eric Champagne	413	2.15	+0.78
Green	Robin George	347	1.81	–
Total		19,199	99.05	–
Rejected and declined		185	0.95	
Turnout		19,384	63.34	
Eligible voters		30,603		
New Democratic hold		Swing		+5.95
Source(s) Source: Elections Alberta

== Senate nominee election results ==
=== 2004 ===
2004 Senate nominee election results: Edmonton-Riverview				Turnout 63.24%	
Affiliation	Candidate	Votes	% votes	% ballots	Rank
Progressive Conservative	Betty Unger	4,789	16.78%	47.54%	2
Independent	Link Byfield	4,390	15.38%	43.58%	4
Progressive Conservative	Bert Brown	3,304	11.58%	32.80%	1
Independent	Tom Sindlinger	2,987	10.47%	29.65%	9
Progressive Conservative	Cliff Breitkreuz	2,960	10.37%	29.39%	3
Alberta Alliance	Michael Roth	2,236	7.84%	22.20%	7
Alberta Alliance	Gary Horan	2,111	7.40%	20.96%	10
Progressive Conservative	David Usherwood	2,067	7.24%	20.52%	6
Alberta Alliance	Vance Gough	1,882	6.59%	18.68%	8
Progressive Conservative	Jim Silye	1,814	6.35%	18.01%	5
Total votes		28,540	100%		
Total ballots		10,073	2.83 votes per ballot		
Rejected, spoiled and declined		5,776			

Voters had the option of selecting four candidates on the ballot.

== Student vote results ==
=== 2004 ===
Participating schools
Avalon Junior High School
Crestwood Junior High
Laurier Heights School
Meadowlark Elementary School
St Paul School
St Rose School

On November 19, 2004 a student vote was conducted at participating Alberta schools to parallel the 2004 Alberta general election results. The vote was designed to educate students and simulate the electoral process for persons who had not yet reached the legal majority. The vote was conducted in 80 of the 83 provincial electoral districts, with students voting for actual election candidates. Schools with a large student body that resided in another electoral district had the option to vote for candidates outside of the electoral district than where they were physically located.

2004 Alberta student vote results
Affiliation	Candidate	Votes	%
Liberal	Kevin Taft	721	52.63%
NDP	Donna Martyn	204	14.89%
Green	John Lackey	186	13.58%
Progressive Conservative	Fred Horne	169	12.33%
Social Credit	David Power	53	3.87%
Alberta Alliance	David Edgar	37	2.70%
Total		1,370	100%
Rejected, spoiled and declined		25	

== See also ==
- List of Alberta provincial electoral districts
- Canadian provincial electoral districts
