= Edmonton-Gold Bar =

Provincial electoral district in Alberta, Canada

Coordinates: 53.5588°N 113.4663°W

Alberta electoral district
- Edmonton-Gold Bar within the City of Edmonton, 2017 boundaries.

Provincial electoral district
- Legislature: Legislative Assembly of Alberta
MLA
Marlin Schmidt
New Democratic
- District created: 1971
- First contested: 1971
- Last contested: 2023

Edmonton-Gold Bar is a provincial electoral district, in Alberta, Canada. The district is one of 87 in the province mandated to return a single member to the Legislative Assembly of Alberta using the first past the post method of voting. The district is primarily urban and located in the central east portion of city of Edmonton. It was created in the 1971 boundary redistribution from part of Strathcona East. In addition to its namesake neighbourhood of Gold Bar, the riding also contains the neighbourhoods of Capilano, Fulton Place, Terrace Heights, Forest Heights, Ottewell, Kenilworth, Holyrood, Avonmore, King Edward Park, Cloverdale, Bonnie Doon, Idylwylde, and Strathearn.

The district is currently represented by Marlin Schmidt of the Alberta NDP.

== History ==
The electoral district was created in the 1971 boundary redistribution from the old electoral district of Strathcona East.

The 2010 boundary redistribution saw significant changes to the riding. All the land north of the North Saskatchewan River was ceded to Edmonton-Highlands-Norwood, while the south boundary was moved from 92 Avenue to 82 Avenue to the Canadian Pacific Rail line to 63 Avenue into Edmonton-Mill Creek. The west boundary changed from Connors Road to travel through the Mill Creek Ravine. Its neighbour to the west is Edmonton-Strathcona.

=== Boundary history ===
32 Edmonton-Gold Bar 2003 boundaries
Bordering districts
North	East	West	South
Edmonton-Highlands-Norwood	Sherwood Park	Edmonton-Calder and Edmonton-Centre	Edmonton-Mill Creek and Edmonton-Strathcona
riding map goes here			
Legal description from the Statutes of Alberta 2003, Electoral Divisions Act.
Starting at the intersection of 97 Street with Norwood Boulevard; then 1. northeast along Norwood Boulevard and 112 Avenue to the Light Rail Transit (LRT) Line; 2. southwest along the LRT line to 84 Street; 3. south along 84 Street to Jasper Avenue; 4. northeast along Jasper Avenue to 82 Street; 5. south along the extension of 82 Street to the right bank of the North Saskatchewan River; 6. east along the right bank of the North Saskatchewan River to the east Edmonton city boundary; 7. south, east and south along the Edmonton city boundary to 92 Avenue; 8. west along 92 Avenue to 50 Street; 9. south along 50 Street to 90 Avenue; 10. northwest along 90 Avenue to Connors Road; 11. northwest along Connors Road to the Low Level Bridge and the right bank of the North Saskatchewan River; 12. northeast along the right bank of the North Saskatchewan River to the southerly extension of 97 Street; 13. north along the extension and 97 Street to the starting point.
Note:

35 Edmonton-Gold Bar 2010 boundaries
Bordering districts
North	East	West	South
Edmonton-Beverly-Clareview and Edmonton-Highlands-Norwood	Sherwood Park	Edmonton-Centre and Edmonton-Strathcona	Edmonton-Mill Creek
Note: Boundary descriptions were not used in the 2010 redistribution

=== Representation history ===
Members of the Legislative Assembly for Edmonton-Gold Bar
Assembly	Years	Member	Party
See: Strathcona East 1959-1971
17th	1971–1975	William Yurko	Progressive Conservative
18th	1975–1979	William Yurko	Progressive Conservative
18th	1979	Vacant	
19th	1979–1982	Al Hiebert	Progressive Conservative
20th	1982–1986	Al Hiebert	Progressive Conservative
21st	1986–1989	Bettie Hewes	Liberal
22nd	1989–1993	Bettie Hewes	Liberal
23rd	1993–1997	Bettie Hewes	Liberal
24th	1997–2001	Hugh MacDonald	Liberal
25th	2001–2004	Hugh MacDonald	Liberal
26th	2004–2008	Hugh MacDonald	Liberal
27th	2008–2012	Hugh MacDonald	Liberal
28th	2012–2015	David Dorward	Progressive Conservative
29th	2015–2019	Marlin Schmidt	New Democratic
30th	2019–2023	Marlin Schmidt	New Democratic
31st	2023–	Marlin Schmidt	New Democratic

The electoral district was created in the 1971 boundary redistribution. The election that year saw Strathcona East incumbent Progressive Conservative MLA William Yurko run here due to his old seat being abolished.

Yurko faced two other candidates in the election held that year and won the new district with a comfortable majority to pick up the seat for his party. After the election Premier Peter Lougheed appointed Yurko as a cabinet minister. He ran for a second term in the 1975 general election. Yurko won a bigger percentage despite losing some of his popular vote as the opposition vote collapsed.

Yurko resigned from his cabinet post in 1978 with the intention of seeking the nomination the Progressive Conservative nomination in Edmonton East for the 1979 federal election. He won the nomination and resigned his seat in early 1979.

The election in 1979 saw Progressive Conservative candidate Al Hiebert easily win a four cornered race to hold the open seat for his party. Hiebert was re-elected with a larger majority in the 1982 general election.

The 1986 election in the district saw a major upset with Hiebert getting defeated by Liberal candidate Bettie Hewes who managed to increase the Liberal vote in the district by over 5800 votes. Hewes won a stronger majority when she was re-elected to her second term in the 1989 general election. She won a landslide running for her third term winning the highest popular vote of any candidate in the 1993 general election. After the election Hewes briefly served as a leader of the opposition and of the Liberal party. She did not run for re-election in 1997 and retired at dissolution of the assembly.

Since 2015, the representative for Edmonton Goldbar has been Marlin Schmidt of the Alberta New Democratic Party.

== Legislative election results ==
=== 1971 ===
1971 Alberta general election
Party	Candidate	Votes	%	±%
Progressive Conservative	William Yurko	5,789	54.36%	–
Social Credit	William F. Young	3,778	35.48%	–
New Democratic	Tom Hennessey	1,082	10.16%	–
Total		10,649	–	–
Rejected, spoiled and declined		51	–	–
Eligible electors / Turnout		14,401	74.30%	–
Progressive Conservative pickup new district.				
Source(s) Source: "Edmonton-Gold Bar Official Results 1971 Alberta general election". Alberta Heritage Community Foundation.

=== 1975 ===
1975 Alberta general election
Party	Candidate	Votes	%	±%
Progressive Conservative	William Yurko	5,247	64.40%	10.03%
New Democratic	Grant Arnold	1,312	16.10%	5.94%
Social Credit	Larry Latter	982	12.05%	-23.43%
Liberal	Don Hoyda	579	7.11%	–
Communist	Harry J. Strynadka	28	0.34%	–
Total		8,148	–	–
Rejected, spoiled and declined		33	–	–
Eligible electors / Turnout		14,191	57.65%	-16.65%
Progressive Conservative hold		Swing		14.70%
Source(s) Source: "Edmonton-Gold Bar Official Results 1975 Alberta general election". Alberta Heritage Community Foundation.

=== 1979 ===
1979 Alberta general election
Party	Candidate	Votes	%	±%
Progressive Conservative	Alois Paul Hiebert	6,044	56.04%	-8.36%
New Democratic	Kathleen Wright	2,343	21.72%	5.62%
Social Credit	Ace Cetinski	1,397	12.95%	0.90%
Liberal	Laurie Switzer	1,002	9.29%	2.18%
Total		10,786	–	–
Rejected, spoiled and declined		20	–	–
Eligible electors / Turnout		17,599	61.40%	3.75%
Progressive Conservative hold		Swing		-6.99%
Source(s) Source: "Edmonton-Gold Bar Official Results 1979 Alberta general election". Alberta Heritage Community Foundation.

=== 1982 ===
1982 Alberta general election
Party	Candidate	Votes	%	±%
Progressive Conservative	Alois Paul Hiebert	7,223	56.71%	0.68%
New Democratic	Allen Eng	3,563	27.98%	6.25%
Western Canada Concept	Joe Wanner	996	7.82%	–
Liberal	Laurie Switzer	567	4.45%	-4.84%
Independent	Chuck Bolton	387	3.04%	–
Total		12,736	–	–
Rejected, spoiled and declined		15	–	–
Eligible electors / Turnout		17,838	71.48%	10.08%
Progressive Conservative hold		Swing		-2.79%
Source(s) Source: "Edmonton-Gold Bar Official Results 1982 Alberta general election". Alberta Heritage Community Foundation.

=== 1986 ===
1986 Alberta general election
Party	Candidate	Votes	%	±%
Liberal	Bettie Hewes	6,378	43.48%	39.02%
Progressive Conservative	Alois Paul Hiebert	4,150	28.29%	-28.42%
New Democratic	Randy Morse	4,142	28.23%	0.26%
Total		14,670	–	–
Rejected, spoiled and declined		27	–	–
Eligible electors / Turnout		23,659	62.12%	-9.36%
Liberal gain from Progressive Conservative		Swing		-6.77%
Source(s) Source: "Edmonton-Gold Bar Official Results 1986 Alberta general election". Alberta Heritage Community Foundation.

=== 1989 ===
1989 Alberta general election
Party	Candidate	Votes	%	±%
Liberal	Bettie Hewes	7,833	54.25%	10.77%
Progressive Conservative	Cathy Wyatt	4,381	30.34%	2.05%
New Democratic	Chris Tomaschuk	2,170	15.03%	-13.21%
Communist	Naomi J. Rankin	55	0.38%	–
Total		14,439	–	–
Rejected, spoiled and declined		23	–	–
Eligible electors / Turnout		22,708	63.69%	1.57%
Liberal hold		Swing		4.36%
Source(s) Source: "Edmonton-Gold Bar Official Results 1989 Alberta general election". Alberta Heritage Community Foundation.

=== 1993 ===
1993 Alberta general election
Party	Candidate	Votes	%	±%
Liberal	Bettie Hewes	10,605	59.19%	4.94%
Progressive Conservative	John Szumlas	4,721	26.35%	-3.99%
New Democratic	Lorraine Crawford	1,820	10.16%	-4.87%
Social Credit	David H. Friesen	516	2.88%	–
Greens	David J. Parker	165	0.92%	–
Natural Law	Roni Shapka	90	0.50%	–
Total		17,917	–	–
Rejected, spoiled and declined		36	–	–
Eligible electors / Turnout		27,205	65.99%	2.30%
Liberal hold		Swing		4.47%
Source(s) Source: "Edmonton-Gold Bar Official Results 1993 Alberta general election". Alberta Heritage Community Foundation.

=== 1997 ===
1997 Alberta general election
Party	Candidate	Votes	%	±%
Liberal	Hugh MacDonald	7,528	48.62%	-10.57%
Progressive Conservative	Susan Green	5,819	37.58%	11.23%
New Democratic	Walter Heneghan	1,970	12.72%	2.56%
Greens	David J. Parker	92	0.59%	-0.33%
Natural Law	Maury Shapka	75	0.48%	-0.02%
Total		15,484	–	–
Rejected, spoiled and declined		18	33	5
Eligible electors / Turnout		23,145	67.00%	1.01%
Liberal hold		Swing		-10.90%
Source(s) Source: "Edmonton-Gold Bar Official Results 1997 Alberta general election". Alberta Heritage Community Foundation.

=== 2001 ===
2001 Alberta general election
Party	Candidate	Votes	%	±%
Liberal	Hugh MacDonald	7,654	51.07%	2.45%
Progressive Conservative	David Fletcher	5,981	39.91%	2.33%
New Democratic	Peter Cross	1,159	7.73%	-4.99%
Greens	Margaret Marean	193	1.29%	0.69%
Total		14,987	–	–
Rejected, spoiled and declined		16	16	5
Eligible electors / Turnout		23,337	64.31%	-2.69%
Liberal hold		Swing		0.06%
Source(s) Source: "Edmonton-Gold Bar Official Results 2001 Alberta general election". Alberta Heritage Community Foundation.

=== 2004 ===
Sukhi Randhawa won the Conservative nomination for Edmonton Gold Bar but later withdrew his candidacy. A new nomination meeting was held.

2004 Alberta general election
Party	Candidate	Votes	%	±%
Liberal	Hugh MacDonald	8,798	62.65%	11.58%
Progressive Conservative	Manjit Dhaliwal	2,572	18.32%	-21.59%
New Democratic	Keith Turnbull	1,967	14.01%	6.27%
Alberta Alliance	Delmar Hunt	538	3.83%	–
Independent	Dave Dowling	167	1.19%	–
Total		14,042	–	–
Rejected, spoiled and declined		74	27	5
Eligible electors / Turnout		25,326	55.76%	-8.55%
Liberal hold		Swing		16.59%
Source(s) Source:

=== 2008 ===
2008 Alberta general election
Party	Candidate	Votes	%	±%
Liberal	Hugh MacDonald	6,279	44.89%	-17.77%
Progressive Conservative	David C. Dorward	5,261	37.61%	19.29%
New Democratic	Sherry McKibben	1,923	13.75%	-0.26%
Green	Dave Zylstra	525	3.75%	–
Total		13,988	–	–
Rejected, spoiled and declined		51	28	2
Eligible electors / Turnout		29,343	47.85%	-7.91%
Liberal hold		Swing		-18.53%
Source(s) Source: "32 - Edmonton-Gold Bar, 2008 Alberta general election". officialresults.elections.ab.ca. Elections Alberta.

=== 2012 ===
2012 Alberta general election
Party	Candidate	Votes	%	±%
Progressive Conservative	David C. Dorward	6,701	32.97%	-4.64%
New Democratic	Marlin Schmidt	5,836	28.71%	14.96%
Liberal	Josipa Petrunic	4,078	20.06%	-24.83%
Wildrose Alliance	Linda Carlson	3,169	15.59%	–
Alberta Party	Dennis O'Neill	345	1.70%	–
Evergreen	David J. Parker	198	0.97%	–
Total		20,327	–	–
Rejected, spoiled and declined		144	18	1
Eligible electors / turnout		32,868	62.29%	14.43%
Progressive Conservative gain from Liberal		Swing		-1.51%
Source(s) Source: "35 - Edmonton-Gold Bar, 2012 Alberta general election". officialresults.elections.ab.ca. Elections Alberta.

=== 2015 ===
2015 Alberta general election
Party	Candidate	Votes	%	±%
New Democratic	Marlin Schmidt	15,349	68.89%	40.17%
Progressive Conservative	David C. Dorward	4,147	18.61%	-14.35%
Wildrose	Justin J. James	1,422	6.38%	-9.21%
Liberal	Ronald Brochu	702	3.15%	-16.91%
Alberta Party	Cristina Stasia	662	2.97%	1.27%
Total		22,282	–	–
Rejected, spoiled and declined		96	25	16
Eligible electors / turnout		36,688	61.04%	-1.25%
New Democratic gain from Progressive Conservative		Swing		23.01%
Source(s) Source: "35 - Edmonton-Gold Bar, 2015 Alberta general election". officialresults.elections.ab.ca. Elections Alberta.

=== 2019 ===
2019 Alberta general election
Party	Candidate	Votes	%	±%
New Democratic	Marlin Schmidt	14,562	59.48%	-9.40%
United Conservative	David C. Dorward	7,174	29.30%	+4.31%
Alberta Party	Diana Ly	2,008	8.20%	5.23%
Liberal	Steve Kochan	315	1.29%	-1.86%
Green	Tanya Herbert	247	1.01%	–
Alberta Independence	Vincent Loyer	176	0.72%	–
Total		24,482	–	–
Rejected, spoiled and declined		27	64	16
Eligible electors / turnout		35,555	68.98%	7.94%
New Democratic hold		Swing		-10.05%
Source(s) Source: "33 - Edmonton-Gold Bar, 2019 Alberta general election". officialresults.elections.ab.ca. Elections Alberta.

=== 2023 ===
2023 Alberta general election
Party	Candidate	Votes	%	±%
New Democratic	Marlin Schmidt	15,508	69.48	+10.00
United Conservative	Miles Berry	6,174	27.66	-1.64
Independent	Graham Lettner	321	1.44	–
Green	Ernestina Malheiro	316	1.42	+0.41
Total		22,319	99.36	–
Rejected and declined		144	0.64	
Turnout		22,463	63.31	
Eligible voters		35,481		
New Democratic hold		Swing		+5.82
Source(s) Source: Elections Alberta

== Senate nominee election results ==
=== 2004 ===
2004 Senate nominee election results: Edmonton-Gold Bar				Turnout 55.03%	
Affiliation	Candidate	Votes	% votes	% ballots	Rank
Progressive Conservative	Betty Unger	4,350	15.59%	44.84%	2
Independent	Link Byfield	3,970	14.23%	40.92%	4
Progressive Conservative	Bert Brown	2,986	10.70%	30.78%	1
Independent	Tom Sindlinger	2,895	10.37%	29.84%	9
Progressive Conservative	Cliff Breitkreuz	2,875	10.30%	29.64%	3
Alberta Alliance	Michael Roth	2,594	9.30%	26.74%	7
Alberta Alliance	Vance Gough	2,342	8.39%	24.14%	8
Alberta Alliance	Gary Horan	2,251	8.07%	23.20%	10
Progressive Conservative	David Usherwood	1,956	7.01%	20.16%	6
Progressive Conservative	Jim Silye	1,688	6.04%	17.40%	5
Total votes		27,907	100%		
Total ballots		9,701	2.88 votes per ballot		
Rejected, spoiled and declined		4,235			

Voters had the option of selecting four candidates on the ballot

== Student vote results ==
=== 2004 ===
Participating schools
Austin O'Brien High School
Braemar School
McNally High School
Ottewell School
St. Gabriel School

On November 19, 2004, a student vote was conducted at participating Alberta schools to parallel the 2004 Alberta general election results. The vote was designed to educate students and simulate the electoral process for persons who have not yet reached the legal majority. The vote was conducted in 80 of the 83 provincial electoral districts with students voting for actual election candidates. Schools with a large student body that reside in another electoral district had the option to vote for candidates outside of the electoral district then where they were physically located.

2004 Alberta student vote results
Affiliation	Candidate	Votes	%
Liberal	Hugh MacDonald	477	47.23%
NDP	Keith Turnbull	214	21.19%
Progressive Conservative	Manjit Dhaliwal	202	20.00%
Alberta Alliance	Delmar Hunt	89	8.81%
Independent	Dave Dowling	28	2.77%
Total		1,010	100%
Rejected, spoiled and declined		43	

=== 2012 ===
2012 Alberta student vote results
Affiliation	Candidate	Votes	%
Progressive Conservative	David Dorward		%
Wildrose	Linda Carlson		
Liberal	Josipa Petrunic		%
Alberta Party	Dennis O’Neill		
NDP	Marlin Schmidt		%
Total			100%

== See also ==
- List of Alberta provincial electoral districts
- Canadian provincial electoral districts
