= Betty Paschen =

Canadian environmentalist and politician (1927–2019)

Elizabeth Emily Paschen (February 26, 1927 - March 14, 2019) was a Canadian environmentalist and former provincial level politician from Alberta, Canada. She served as Leader of the Alberta Greens from its founding in 1990 to 1996.

== Political career ==
Paschen became leader of the Alberta Greens after founder Norman Conrad moved out of the province. She first ran for provincial office in a by-election held in the Edmonton-Strathcona electoral district on October 18, 1990. Paschen received 4.54% of the vote and finished fifth out of sixth place, losing to Barrie Chivers a candidate for the New Democrats. She finished ahead of Social Credit leader Robert Alford.

Paschen lead the party into the 1993 Alberta general election. The party did not make much of an impact as it only fielded a slate of 11 candidates winning 0.20% of the popular vote and finishing second last over all. Paschen ran for a second time in Edmonton-Strathcona. Her popular vote was cut in half from the by-election and she only took 1.5% of the popular vote.

After retiring from provincial politics, Paschen moved to Ontario and became a wind farm operator.

Paschen died on March 14, 2019.

Party political offices
Preceded by Norman Conrad	Leader of the Alberta Greens; 1990-1996	Succeeded by David Parker
