= David Shepherd (Canadian politician) =

Canadian politician (born 1973)

David Shepherd MLA
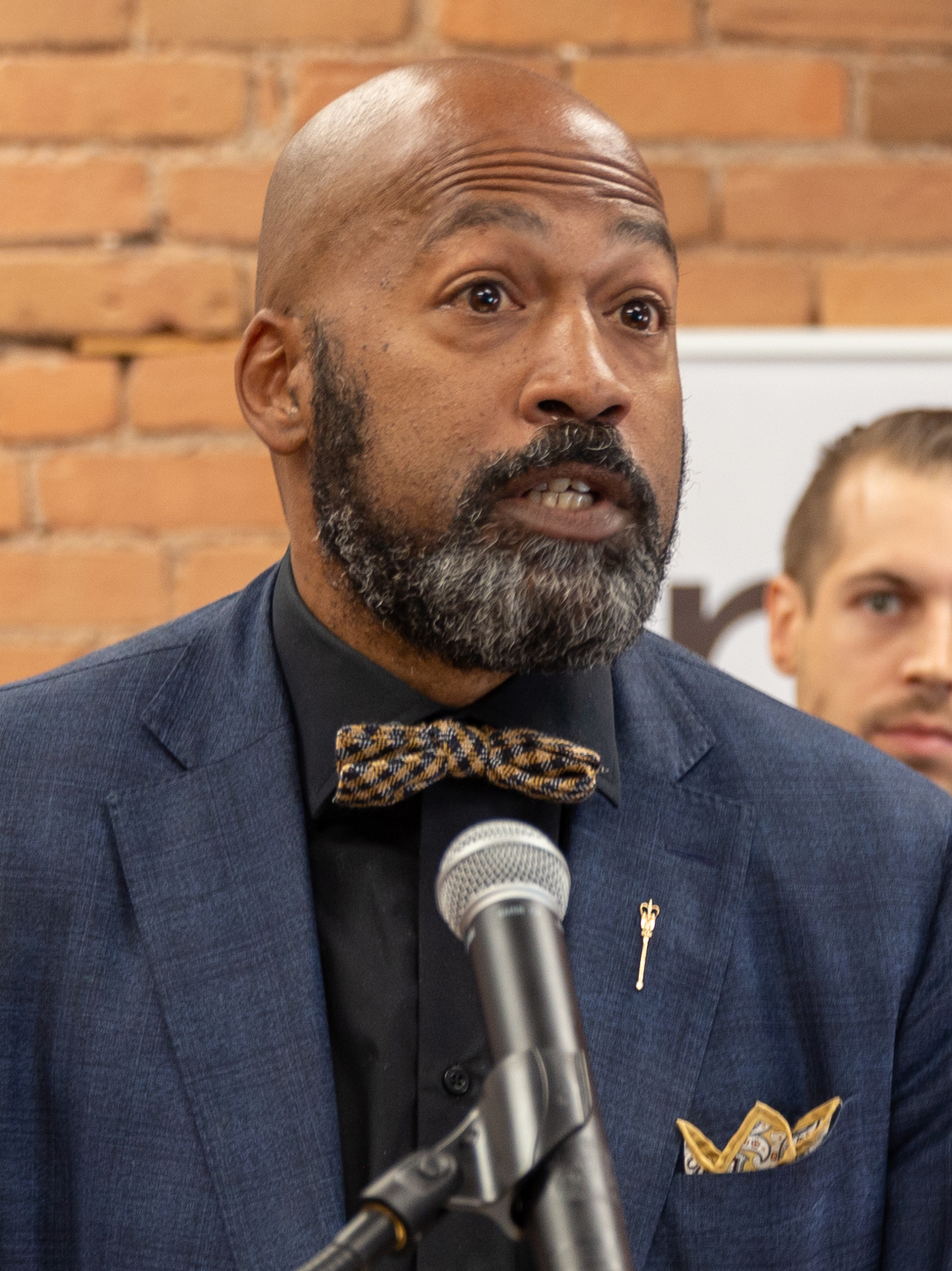
- Shepherd in 2019

Member of the Legislative Assembly of Alberta for Edmonton-City Centre Edmonton-Centre 2015–2019
- Incumbent
- Assumed office May 5, 2015
- Preceded by: Laurie Blakeman

Personal details
- Born: June 19, 1973 (age 53) Edmonton, Alberta
- Party: Alberta New Democratic Party
- Education: Royal Roads University, MacEwan University
- Occupation: Communications professional

David Murray Shepherd (born 1973) is a Canadian politician who was elected in the 2015 Alberta general election to the Legislative Assembly of Alberta to represent the electoral district of Edmonton-Centre, and re-elected in the 2019 Alberta general election to represent its successor district, Edmonton-City Centre.

== Personal life ==
Shepherd has a Bachelors of Arts in Professional Communications from Royal Roads University where he received the Chancellor's award in 2014. He also has a diploma in music performance and live sound recording from MacEwan University. Shepherd worked in a variety of jobs such as taxpayer service agent, salesperson, musician and studio engineer.

Before being elected, Shepherd worked in the Communications field as a trainer/facilitator for the Canada Revenue Agency, and advisor and writer for the North Edge Business Association, Communications Officer for the City of Edmonton and a writer for Alberta Health.

During his time as a musician, David played piano and keyboards for the Mike McDonald Band, the James Murdoch Band, Tanyss Nixi and others. He also performed his own music and, in 2010, released a solo album, Gotta Leave Where You're From.

Shepherd is an avid cyclist and volunteered for the Edmonton Bike Coalition as a spokesperson and organizer.

== Political Work ==
In 2017, David worked with then Minister of Culture and Tourism, Ricardo Miranda, to secure a proclamation making Alberta the fourth province in Canada to recognize February as Black History Month. He also worked with the then-Speaker of the Legislature, Bob Wanner, to host the first celebration of Black History Month at the Alberta Legislature. It is now an annual event.

After his reelection in 2019, David was named the Critic for Health for the Alberta NDP Caucus. He remained in that role until January 2024. In September 2024, he was appointed as the Alberta NDP Caucus' Shadow Minister for Public Safety and Emergency Services and Deputy House Leader.

== Electoral history ==
=== 2023 general election ===
2023 Alberta general election: Edmonton-City Centre
Party	Candidate	Votes	%	±%
New Democratic	David Shepherd	12,431	74.89	+8.87
United Conservative	Richard Wong	3,691	22.24	+0.46
Green	David Clark	476	2.87	+1.21
Total		16,598	98.84	–
Rejected and declined		195	1.16	
Turnout		16,793	51.00	
Eligible voters		32,928		
New Democratic hold		Swing		+4.21
Source(s) Source: Elections Alberta

=== 2019 general election ===
2019 Alberta general election: Edmonton-City Centre
Party	Candidate	Votes	%	±%
New Democratic	David Shepherd	13,598	66.0%	+11.59%
United Conservative	Lily Le	4,485	21.8%	+3.68%
Alberta Party	Bob Philp	1,907	9.3%	--
Green	Chris Alders	342	1.7%	--
Independence	John R. Morton	169	0.8%	--
Independent	Blake N. Dickinson	95	0.5%	--
Total valid votes		20,596		
Rejected, spoiled, and declined		191	76	22
Registered electors and turnout		38,887	53.5%	
New Democratic hold		Swing		%
Source(s) "2019 Provincial General Election Results". Elections Alberta.

=== 2015 general election ===
2015 Alberta general election: Edmonton-Centre
Party	Candidate	Votes	%	±%
New Democratic	David Shepherd	8,983	54.39%	38.19%
Liberal	Laurie Blakeman	4,199	25.42%	-14.95%
Progressive Conservative	Catherine Keill	2,228	13.49%	-17.34%
Wildrose	Joe Byram	772	4.67%	-7.94%
Independent	Greg Keating	295	1.79%	–
Independent	Rory Joe Koopmans	40	0.24%	–
Total		16,517	–	–
Rejected, spoiled and declined		64	–	–
Eligible electors / turnout		34,976	47.41%	-2.10%
New Democratic gain from Liberal		Swing		9.71%
Source(s) Source: "Elections Alberta 2015 General Election". Elections Alberta.
