= David Dorward =

Alberta politician

The Honourable David C. Dorward ECA
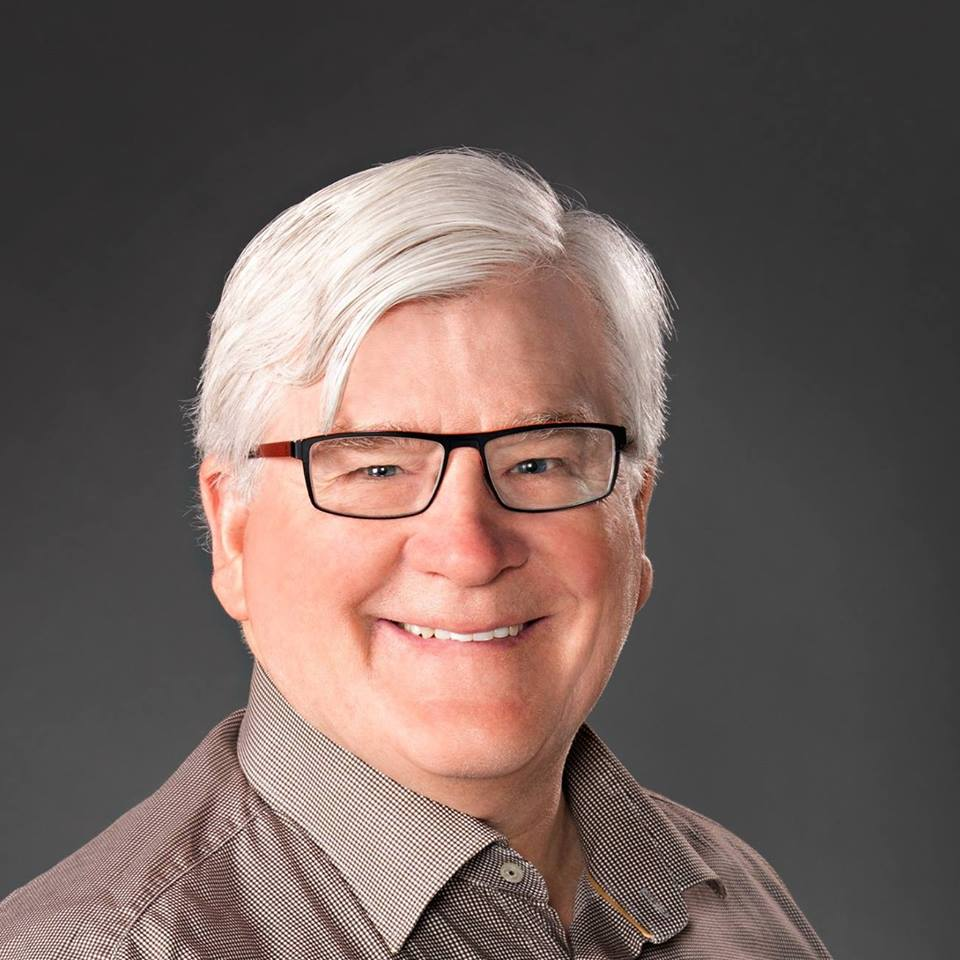

Member of the Legislative Assembly of Alberta for Edmonton-Gold Bar
- In office April 23, 2012 – May 5, 2015
- Preceded by: Hugh MacDonald
- Succeeded by: Marlin Schmidt

Personal details
- Born: January 22, 1952 (age 74) Edmonton, Alberta, Canada
- Party: United Conservative Party

David Cameron Dorward ECA (born January 22, 1952) is a Canadian politician who represented the electoral district of Edmonton-Gold Bar in the Legislative Assembly of Alberta from 2012 to 2015. He has lived in Alberta since the mid 1950s and currently resides in Edmonton.

Dorward was the approved United Conservative Party candidate for the electoral riding of Edmonton-Gold Bar for the 2019 Alberta provincial election.

== Background ==
Dorward served in the Alberta cabinet with Premier Jim Prentice. He is a graduate of the Northern Alberta Institute of Technology and the University of Alberta. David Cameron DORWARD, FCPA, FCA is registered as a member of the Chartered Professional Accountants of Alberta (CPA Alberta).

Dorward has contributed to the community through various volunteer and community works including sitting on various local and provincial boards. This includes coaching youth basketball and organizing basketball programs for communities within the electoral division of Edmonton-Gold Bar. Dorward received the Top 50 Alumni award, chosen for the differences he made within our communities.

In 2005, Dorward led and founded the initiative that raised $38M for the building of the Saville Community Sports Centre (GO Centre), a 195,000-square-foot GO Centre located at the University of Alberta south campus area. The center was opened for use in September 2011.

Dorward is a member of the Church of Jesus Christ of Latter-day Saints.

== Political career ==
Dorward ran for mayor of Edmonton in the 2010 Edmonton municipal election. He finished in second place and was defeated by Stephen Mandel.

Two years later Dorward ran for a seat to the Legislative Assembly of Alberta in the electoral district of Edmonton-Gold Bar as a Progressive Conservative candidate. He defeated five other candidates to win the seat for his party, before being defeated by the NDP's Marlin Schmidt.

As an MLA for the Legislative Assembly of Alberta, Dorward held various roles including:

- Associate Minister of Aboriginal Relations (Reporting to the Premier)
- Deputy Government House Whip
- Member of the Treasury Board.
- Deputy Chair of the Select Special Conflicts of Interest Act Review Committee
- Deputy Chair of the Standing Committee on Public Accounts
- Member of the Special Standing Committee on Members’ Services
- Member of the Standing Committee on Alberta’s Economic Future
- Member of the Standing Committee on the Alberta Heritage Savings Trust Fund

In 2017, the United Conservative Party was formed under Jason Kenney in a historic merger of the Progressive Conservative Party and the Wildrose Party, with 95% approval.

In March 2019, leading up to the Alberta provincial election, Dorward's transphobic social media comments from 2016 resurfaced. Dorward responded to these comments in a short online apology, stating that "while [he] was not alone in sharing this belief at the time, [he is] relieved that such fears have not been validated in the following three years." To be specific, these comments involved him stating his concerns that transgender bathroom laws would permit young men to walk into girl's restrooms whenever they were so inclined.

== Electoral record ==
=== 2019 general election ===
2019 Alberta general election: Edmonton-Gold Bar
Party	Candidate	Votes	%	±%
New Democratic	Marlin Schmidt	14,562	59.48%	-9.40%
United Conservative	David C. Dorward	7,174	29.30%	+4.31%
Alberta Party	Diana Ly	2,008	8.20%	5.23%
Liberal	Steve Kochan	315	1.29%	-1.86%
Green	Tanya Herbert	247	1.01%	–
Alberta Independence	Vincent Loyer	176	0.72%	–
Total		24,482	–	–
Rejected, spoiled and declined		27	64	16
Eligible electors / turnout		35,555	68.98%	7.94%
New Democratic hold		Swing		-10.05%
Source(s) Source: "33 - Edmonton-Gold Bar, 2019 Alberta general election". officialresults.elections.ab.ca. Elections Alberta.

=== 2015 general election ===
2015 Alberta general election: Edmonton-Gold Bar
Party	Candidate	Votes	%	±%
New Democratic	Marlin Schmidt	15,349	68.89%	40.17%
Progressive Conservative	David C. Dorward	4,147	18.61%	-14.35%
Wildrose	Justin J. James	1,422	6.38%	-9.21%
Liberal	Ronald Brochu	702	3.15%	-16.91%
Alberta Party	Cristina Stasia	662	2.97%	1.27%
Total		22,282	–	–
Rejected, spoiled and declined		96	25	16
Eligible electors / turnout		36,688	61.04%	-1.25%
New Democratic gain from Progressive Conservative		Swing		23.01%
Source(s) Source: "35 - Edmonton-Gold Bar, 2015 Alberta general election". officialresults.elections.ab.ca. Elections Alberta.

=== 2012 general election ===
2012 Alberta general election: Edmonton-Gold Bar
Party	Candidate	Votes	%	±%
Progressive Conservative	David C. Dorward	6,701	32.97%	-4.64%
New Democratic	Marlin Schmidt	5,836	28.71%	14.96%
Liberal	Josipa Petrunic	4,078	20.06%	-24.83%
Wildrose Alliance	Linda Carlson	3,169	15.59%	–
Alberta Party	Dennis O'Neill	345	1.70%	–
Evergreen	David J. Parker	198	0.97%	–
Total		20,327	–	–
Rejected, spoiled and declined		144	18	1
Eligible electors / turnout		32,868	62.29%	14.43%
Progressive Conservative gain from Liberal		Swing		-1.51%
Source(s) Source: "35 - Edmonton-Gold Bar, 2012 Alberta general election". officialresults.elections.ab.ca. Elections Alberta.
