= George Read (Alberta politician) =

Canadian politician

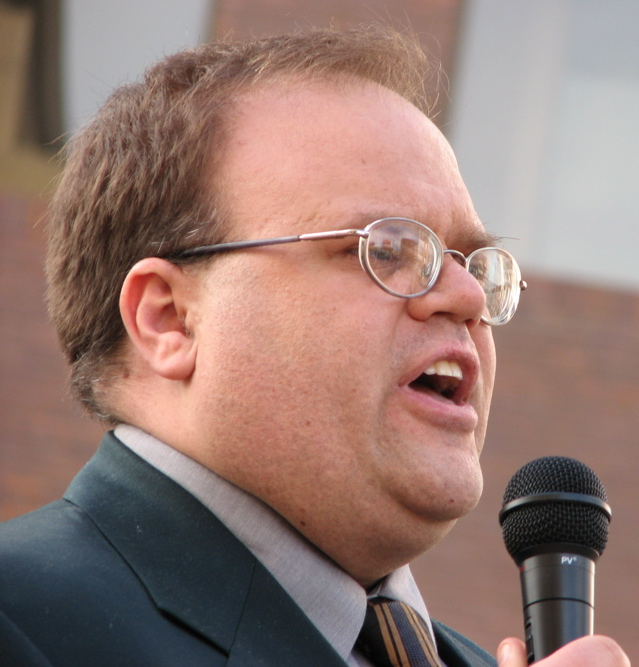
George Read speaking at a Canadians For Kyoto rally in Calgary, Alberta, Canada, on March 11, 2007.

George Read is a Canadian politician who was the former leader of the Alberta Greens and formerly a key organizer for the federal Green Party of Canada (GPC) in Alberta.

== Green Party organizing ==
Read led the provincial and federal Green Parties in Alberta during a period (what period) of growth in support for the parties. Prior to his involvement, the Green Party remained well below 1% of the vote in Alberta. (Source needed)

=== Alberta Greens ===
Read was elected leader of the Alberta Greens at the provincial convention held in Red Deer on November 1, 2003. Read won the position against incumbent David Parker.

=== Green Party of Canada ===
Read brought together organizers for the Green Party of Canada who recruited the first full slate of Green candidates in Alberta for the 2004 federal election.

In that election, the Green Party of Canada received a higher percentage of votes in Alberta than in other provinces: the party won 6.3% of the popular vote in the province, and approximately 10% in the ridings of Calgary Centre-North (third highest Green vote percentage in Canada) and Calgary South Centre (fourth highest in Canada). Some commentators ascribed this to the relatively weak position of the Liberal Party of Canada and New Democratic Party in Alberta.

Read was the National campaign manager of the Green Party of Canada for the 2006 Federal election.

Read participated in a committee to decide staff changes in the GPC as of November 2006. One of the positions it would decide would be the National Campaign Manager.

== Election campaigns ==
In June 2004, he ran for election as the Green Party of Canada candidate in the federal riding of Calgary Southeast, finishing just behind the NDP candidate.

He ran for the provincial Greens in the Calgary-Egmont riding in the 2004 Alberta provincial election. Finishing just behind the Alberta Alliance and ahead of the NDP.

He was the Alberta Greens candidate in the June 12, 2007, by-election for the riding of Calgary Elbow.

Read was the leader of the Alberta Greens in the Mar 3rd 2008 provincial election. He ran in the riding of Calgary Northwest and received 4.95% of the vote. The Alberta Greens moved from 2.8% of the vote in 2004 to 4.6% of the vote in 2008 under Reads Leadership.

The Alberta Greens ran 79 candidates in 2008 up from 49 candidates in 2004.

=== Partial electoral history ===
Alberta provincial by-election, June 12, 2007: Calgary-Elbow Resignation of Ralph Klein on January 15, 2007
Party	Candidate	Votes	%	±%
Liberal	Craig Cheffins	4,823	45.77	+9.24
Progressive Conservative	Brian Heninger	4,039	38.33	−13.15
Green	George Read	590	5.60	+0.66
Alberta Alliance	Jane Morgan	439	4.17	+0.56
New Democratic	Al Brown	348	3.30	+0.75
Social Credit	Trevor Grover	175	1.66	+1.15
Independent	Jeff Willerton	124	1.17	—
Total valid votes		10,538	—	—
Rejected, spoiled and declined		13	25	3
Eligible electors / turnout		30,538	34.64	—
Liberal gain from Progressive Conservative		Swing		+11.20
Source(s) Alberta. Chief Electoral Officer (2007). Report on the June 12, 2007 By-elections: Calgary-Elbow & Drumheller-Stettler (Report). Edmonton: Legislative Assembly of Alberta; Chief Electoral Officer.

== Personal history ==
Read was born and raised Feb 29, 1972 in Calgary, Alberta, Canada.

As a youth, he was a member of Scouts Canada, which he credits with giving him a love of the outdoors.

He graduated with a Bachelor of Arts in Political Science/Management from the University of Calgary.

He has also been active for many years with the Sierra Club of Canada, in Calgary.

== See also ==
- List of Green party leaders in Canada

Party political offices
Preceded by David Parker	Leader of the Alberta Greens; 2003 - 2008	Succeeded by Joe Anglin
