= Steve Young (Alberta politician) =

Canadian politician

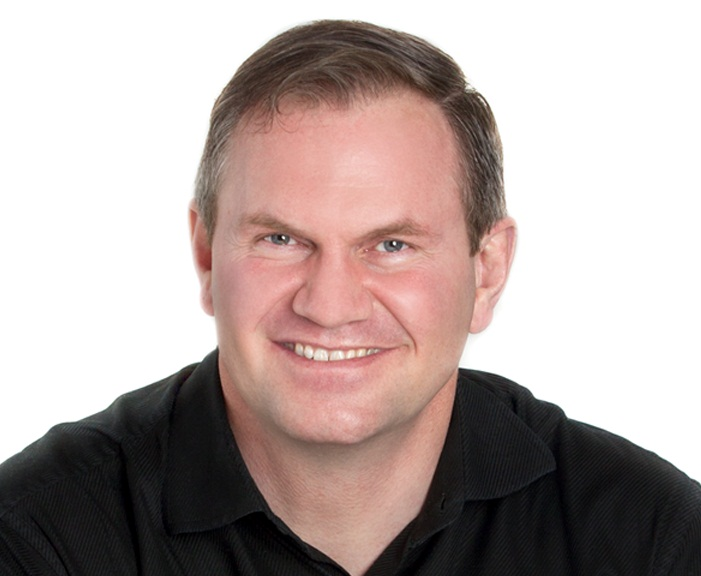

MLA for Edmonton-Riverview
- In office April 23, 2012 – May 5, 2015
- Preceded by: Kevin Taft
- Succeeded by: Lori Sigurdson

Personal details
- Born: May 17, 1969 (age 57) Calgary, Alberta
- Party: Progressive Conservative
- Spouse(s): Leanne Young, Q.C.
- Children: Abbey and Taylor
- Education: University of Alberta
- Occupation: Law Instructor, Former Police Officer

Steven Keith Young (born May 17, 1969) is a Canadian politician who served as the Member of the Legislative Assembly of Alberta representing the electoral district of Edmonton-Riverview from 2012 until his defeat in 2015. He was first elected April 23, 2012, and subsequently appointed to the role of the Chief Government Whip.

== Early life ==
Young was born in Calgary, Alberta and after moving to the Edmonton area grew up on an acreage south east of Sherwood Park in Strathcona County.

Hockey was a strong interest and saw him play Major Junior Hockey in the Western Hockey League from 1986 to 1990. The New York Islanders selected Young in the 1989 NHL entry draft in round 5, 90th overall.

Young attended the University of Alberta and played for the Alberta Golden Bears Hockey Team. While there, he earned a bachelor's degree in education (B.Ed.), won three Canada West League Championships (1990–91, 1991–92, 1992–93), and a CIS National Title (1991–92).

== Electoral history ==
2015 Alberta general election: Edmonton-Riverview
Party	Candidate	Votes	%	±%
New Democratic	Lori Sigurdson	12,108	62.78	+41.64
Progressive Conservative	Steve Young	3,732	19.35	-20.24
Liberal	Donna Wilson	1,416	7.34	-15.49
Wildrose	Ian Crawford	1,350	7.00	-7.78
Alberta Party	Brandon Beringer	487	2.53	+0.87
Green	Sandra Lange	135	0.70	
Independent	Glenn Miller	59	0.31	
Total valid votes		19,287		
Rejected, spoiled, and declined		128		
Registered electors		31,416		
Turnout		19,415	61.80	-2.43
New Democratic gain from Progressive Conservative		Swing		+30.94
Source(s) Elections Alberta. "Electoral Division Results: Edmonton-Riverview".

2012 Alberta general election: Edmonton-Riverview
Party	Candidate	Votes	%	±%
Progressive Conservative	Steve Young	7,288	39.59	+4.56
Liberal	Arif Khan	4,202	22.83	-27.78
New Democratic	Lori Sigurdson	3,892	21.14	+12.44
Wildrose	John Corie	2,721	14.78	+12.55
Alberta Party	Timothy Wong	306	1.66	
Total valid votes		18,409		
Rejected, spoiled, and declined		203		
Registered electors		28,975		
Turnout		18,612	64.23	+16.70
Progressive Conservative gain from Liberal		Swing		+16.17
Source(s) Elections Alberta. "Electoral Division Results: Edmonton-Riverview".
