= Michael Henry (Alberta politician) =

Canadian politician (born 1955)

Michael Henry (born 1955) is a former politician from Alberta, Canada. He served in the Legislative Assembly of Alberta from 1993 to 1997.

== Political career ==
Henry ran for the Alberta legislature in the 1993 general election in the electoral district of Edmonton-Centre for the Liberals. He won by 2000 votes over Progressive Conservative John Wheelwright. He did not run for a second term in office and retired at dissolution of the legislature in 1997.

== Late life ==
After his service in the legislature, Henry joined MacEwan University, a public four-year undergraduate baccalaureate institution in Edmonton, where he was the associate dean of the School of Business. He then went to Thompson Rivers University in Kamloops, British Columbia, where he is dean of the School of Business and Economics. He is a partner in a consulting firm, Abells Henry Public Affairs and a partner in the Canada Asia Synergy Group.

Legislative Assembly of Alberta
Preceded by William Roberts	MLA Edmonton-Centre; 1993–1997	Succeeded by Laurie Blakeman
