= Mary LeMessurier =

Canadian politician (1929–2018)

Mary J. LeMessurier

MLA for Edmonton Centre
- In office 1979–1986
- Preceded by: Gordon Miniely
- Succeeded by: William Roberts

Minister of Culture
- In office March 1979 – May 1986
- Preceded by: Horst Schmid
- Succeeded by: Dennis Anderson

Personal details
- Born: Mary Jean Murray; June 12, 1929 Montreal, Quebec, Canada
- Died: March 11, 2018 (aged 88) Edmonton, Alberta, Canada
- Party: Progressive Conservative

Mary Jean LeMessurier (née Murray; June 12, 1929 – March 11, 2018) was a politician from Alberta, Canada. She served in the Legislative Assembly of Alberta from 1979 to 1986 as a member of the Progressive Conservative caucus. She served as Minister of Culture under Premier Peter Lougheed.

== Political career ==
LeMessurier was first elected to the Alberta Legislature in the 1979 general election. She won the electoral district of Edmonton-Centre to hold it for the Progressive Conservative party. After the election Premier Peter Lougheed appointed her Minister of Culture.

LeMessurier was re-elected in the 1982 election. On June 12, 1985 she declared Alberta Government House a provincial historical site. She kept her portfolio after Don Getty became premier in November 1985. She was defeated in the 1986 general election by William Roberts.

After her defeat, she served as Agent General of Alberta for six years. On October 21, 1998, she was appointed to the Order of Canada.
