= William Roberts (Alberta politician) =

Canadian politician

Member of the Legislative Assembly of Alberta for Edmonton-Centre
- In office 1986–1993
- Preceded by: Mary LeMessurier
- Succeeded by: Michael Henry

Personal details
- Born: July 22, 1954 (age 72) Hamilton, Ontario
- Party: Alberta New Democratic Party

William Roberts (born July 22, 1954) is a former provincial level politician from Alberta, Canada. He served as a member of the Legislative Assembly of Alberta from 1986 to 1993.

== Political career ==
Roberts ran for office as a New Democrat candidate in the 1986 Alberta general election. He defeated incumbent Progressive Conservative MLA Mary LeMessurier by a margin of 160 votes. Roberts ran for a second term in office in the 1989 Alberta general election. In his second election he improved his margin of victory and won a comfortable plurality on a three-way split defeating five other candidates. Roberts retired at dissolution of the Legislature in 1993.
