= Edmonton-City Centre =

Provincial electoral district in Alberta, Canada

Alberta electoral district
- Edmonton-City Centre within the City of Edmonton (2017 boundaries)

Provincial electoral district
- Legislature: Legislative Assembly of Alberta
MLA
David Shepherd
New Democratic
- District created: 2017
- First contested: 2019
- Last contested: 2023

Demographics
- Population (2016): 47,715
- Area (km²): 12.3
- Pop. density (per km²): 3,879.3

Edmonton-City Centre is a provincial electoral district in Alberta, Canada. The district is one of 87 districts mandated to return a single member (MLA) to the Legislative Assembly of Alberta using the first past the post method of voting. The current MLA is David Shepherd, first elected in the 2019 Alberta election.

== Geography ==
The district is located in central Edmonton, containing the city's downtown core as well as the neighbourhoods of Wîhkwêntôwin, Rossdale, Queen Mary Park, Central McDougall, Spruce Avenue, and Westwood, also including the main campus of MacEwan University.

== History ==
Edmonton-City Centre
Assembly	Years	Member	Party
Riding created from Edmonton-Calder and Edmonton-Centre
30th	2019–2023	David Shepherd	New Democratic
31st	2023–Present	David Shepherd	New Democratic

The district was created in 2017 when the Electoral Boundaries Commission recommended renaming Edmonton-Centre (to reduce confusion with similarly named federal districts). The commission also extended its border north to the Yellowhead Highway between 97 St NW and 109 St NW, adding the Northern Alberta Institute of Technology's main campus to the riding.

== Electoral results ==
Redistributed results, 2015 Alberta general election
Party	Votes	%
New Democratic	10,108	56.17%
Liberal	4,256	23.65%
Progressive Conservative	2,406	13.37%
Wildrose	892	4.96%
Others	335	1.86%

2019 Alberta general election
Party	Candidate	Votes	%	±%
New Democratic	David Shepherd	13,598	66.0%	+11.59%
United Conservative	Lily Le	4,485	21.8%	+3.68%
Alberta Party	Bob Philp	1,907	9.3%	--
Green	Chris Alders	342	1.7%	--
Independence	John R. Morton	169	0.8%	--
Independent	Blake N. Dickinson	95	0.5%	--
Total valid votes		20,596		
Rejected, spoiled, and declined		191	76	22
Registered electors and turnout		38,887	53.5%	
New Democratic hold		Swing		%
Source(s) "2019 Provincial General Election Results". Elections Alberta.

2023 Alberta general election
Party	Candidate	Votes	%	±%
New Democratic	David Shepherd	12,431	74.89	+8.87
United Conservative	Richard Wong	3,691	22.24	+0.46
Green	David Clark	476	2.87	+1.21
Total		16,598	98.84	–
Rejected and declined		195	1.16	
Turnout		16,793	51.00	
Eligible voters		32,928		
New Democratic hold		Swing		+4.21
Source(s) Source: Elections Alberta

== See also ==
- List of Alberta provincial electoral districts
- Canadian provincial electoral districts
