= Kevin Taft =

Canadian politician

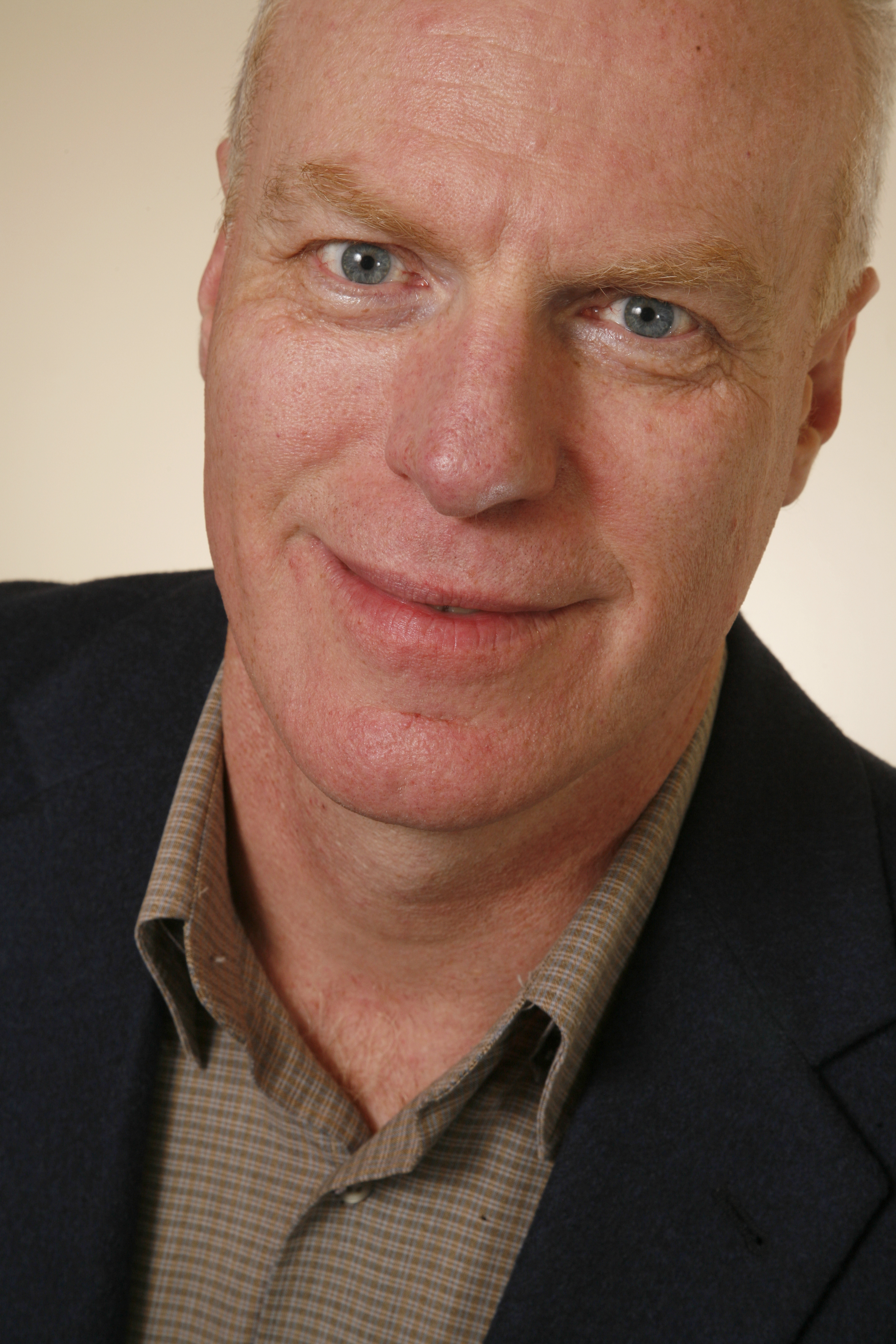
- Taft in 2017

Leader of the Official Opposition in Alberta
- In office 27 March 2004 – 14 December 2008
- Preceded by: Ken Nicol
- Succeeded by: David Swann

Leader of the Alberta Liberal Party
- In office 2004 – 13 December 2008
- Preceded by: Don Massey (interim)
- Succeeded by: David Swann

Member of the Legislative Assembly of Alberta for Edmonton Riverview
- In office 12 March 2001 – 23 April 2012
- Preceded by: Linda Sloan
- Succeeded by: Steve Young

Personal details
- Born: 9 September 1955 (age 71) Saskatoon, Saskatchewan, Canada
- Party: Alberta Liberal
- Spouse: Jeanette Boman
- Children: 2
- Education: University of Alberta; University of Warwick
- Profession: Consultant

Kevin Taft (born 9 September 1955) is an author, consultant, speaker, and former provincial politician in Alberta, Canada. Prior to his election, he worked in various public policy roles (1973–2000) in the Government of Alberta, private and non-profit sectors, in the areas of health, energy, and economic policy. From 1986 to 1991 he was CEO of the ExTerra Foundation, which conducted paleontological expeditions in China's Gobi Desert, Alberta's badlands, and the Canadian Arctic. He is the author of five books as well as several research studies and articles on political and economic issues in Alberta. In the mid-late 1990s Dr. Taft wrote two books critical of the ruling Progressive Conservatives. The Premier of Alberta at the time (Ralph Klein) insulted Taft in the Alberta Legislature, which solidified Taft's desire to run for office to defend his perspective on public policy. He was an Alberta Liberal member of the Legislative Assembly of Alberta from 2001 to 2012, and Leader of the Official Opposition from 2004 to 2008. Taft is currently an author, speaker, and consultant. He is father to two adult sons and currently resides in Edmonton, Alberta, Canada with his partner Jeanette Boman.

== Education ==
Taft has a B.A. in Political Science and Master's Degree in Community Development from the University of Alberta. He received a Ph.D. (1998) in Business from the University of Warwick in England.

== Career ==
=== Early career ===
Taft has worked as a consultant and policy analyst in both the public and private sectors. His professional career began in 1973 at the age of eighteen when Peter Lougheed's Progressive Conservative cabinet appointed him a member of the Alberta Health Facilities Review Committee. His position on the committee involved investigating and monitoring Alberta's hospitals and nursing homes, and reporting through the committee to the Legislative Assembly of Alberta. Taft left the committee in 1982. He also worked as a planning consultant with the Alberta Hospital Association and on the Alberta government's Nursing Home Review Panel task force from 1981 to 1982. In 1983, he became Coordinator of Planning, Research, and Evaluation for the Edmonton Region of Alberta Social Services and Community Health, where he remained until 1986.

=== Work with the ExTerra Foundation ===
Taft was the chief executive officer of the ExTerra Foundation from 1986 to 1991, where he oversaw a team that planned and developed the Canada-China Dinosaur Project. The project's scientific partners were the Tyrrell Museum of Palaeontology, the Canadian Museum of Nature, and the Institute of Vertebrate Palaeontology and Paleoanthropology of the Chinese Academy of Sciences. The project was conceived and initiated by anthropologist Brian Noble and palaeontologist Philip J. Currie. Noble, who named the Foundation and lead the international team from 1983 to 1989, invited Taft to become a co-founding member of Ex Terra's Board in 1984. The project included a multimillion-dollar series of expeditions that formed "one of the biggest dinosaur hunts in history". It also included books, internationally televised films, and eventually an international touring exhibit.

The joint Canadian-Chinese expeditions went to China's Gobi Desert, Alberta's badlands, and the Canadian arctic. At the time, China was just beginning to open to international visitors, and the Gobi Desert expeditions were the first involving westerners since the 1930s.

The project discovered several new dinosaur species and yielded a large number of scientific papers, including a special edition of the Canadian Journal of Earth Sciences.

Taft resigned from ExTerra in 1991 when it encountered financial shortfalls.

=== Consulting work ===
From 1991 to 2000, Taft worked as a consultant, researcher, and speaker through his firm Taft Research and Communications. His primary focuses were health care policy, energy, and economic policy.

Taft consulted extensively with the Alberta Ministry Responsible for Seniors from 1991 to 1993, an experience that prompted him to write his first book, Shredding the Public Interest, in 1997. In it, Taft challenged the provincial government's claims that spending on public services was soaring. The book was reviewed nationally, and became a bestseller. Shredding the Public Interest placed Taft in the public eye, and cemented his reputation as a government critic. The book generated province-wide debate, attracting public criticism and avid defenders. Premier Klein publicly called Taft a communist, and suggested he should run for political office if he felt he had enough support. Shredding the Public Interest topped local bestseller charts and appeared on national bestselling charts as well. It remained on the Financial Post's national bestseller list for 14 weeks, and was named Trade Book of the Year by the Alberta Book Publishers' Association in 1998.

In 1999, Taft co-authored a study criticizing the deregulation of Alberta's electricity system, and in 1999 and 2000, he wrote two studies arguing against privatizing Epcor, Edmonton's public electricity utility. In large part because of this research, Edmonton's city council of the day eventually dropped its plans to sell Epcor in a narrow 7–6 vote. Edmonton never sold the utility, and remains Epcor's sole shareholder.

Taft published his second book with co-author Gillian Steward, Clear Answers: The Economics and Politics of For-Profit Medicine, in 2000. In it, they argue "There is overwhelming evidence that private health care hasn't worked elsewhere and won't work in Alberta", that private healthcare would increase costs and lengthen waiting lists, that privatization of healthcare is irreversible, and that it would allow American healthcare providers to compete with Alberta's public system. The book also argues that the provincial government had systematically starved the public health system in order to make private healthcare a tempting alternative to the public model. The book, like its predecessor, topped local bestseller lists and appeared on national bestseller lists.

=== Career in politics ===
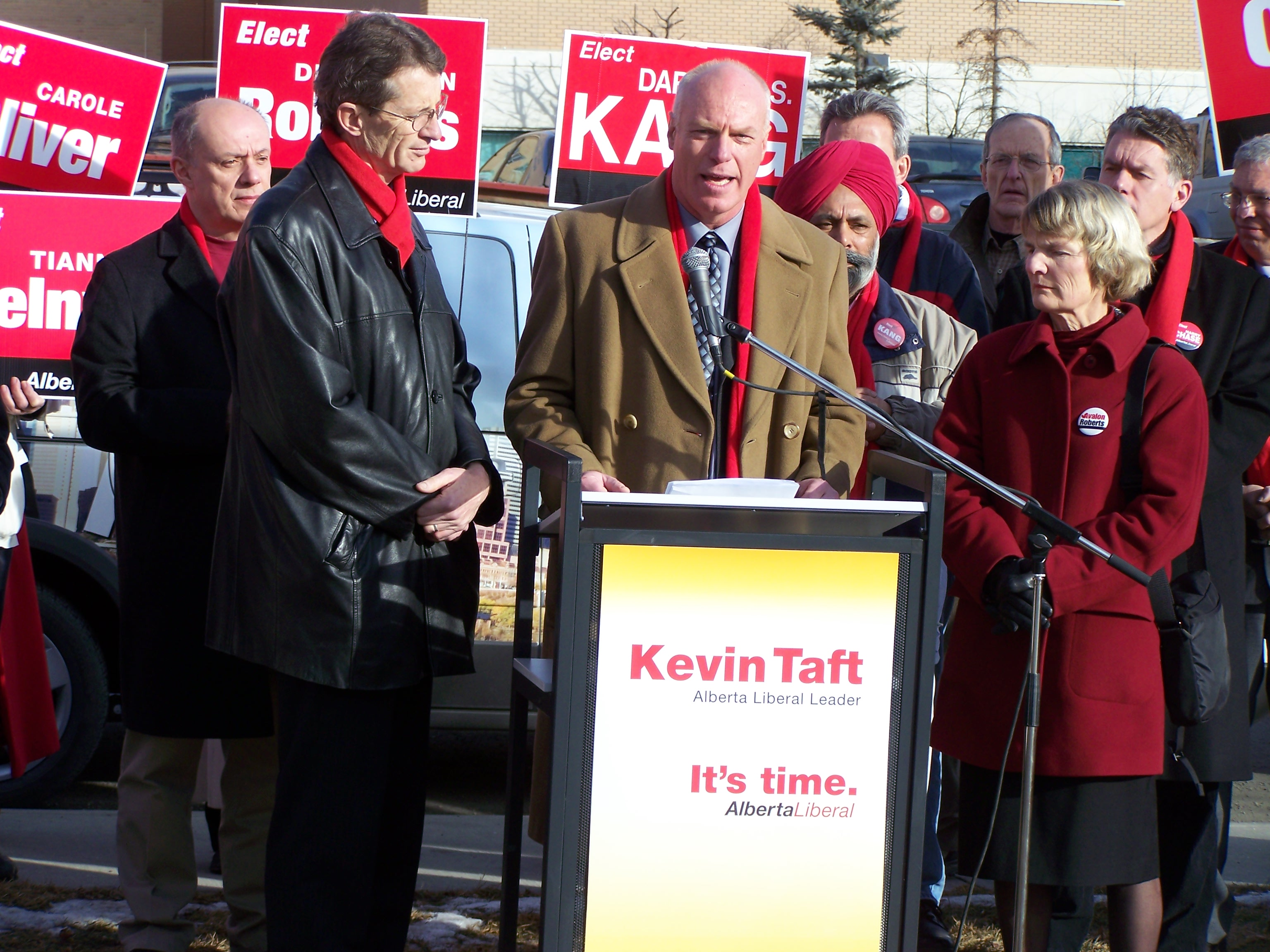
Kevin Taft making a campaign speech in Calgary during the 2008 provincial election

In December 2000, Taft announced he would seek the Alberta Liberal Party nomination for the next provincial election, "citing his frustration with Tory policies in health care and power deregulation". He won the nomination for Edmonton-Riverview in January 2001. He was elected, defeating Progressive Conservative candidate and former city councillor Wendy Kinsella.

Three years later, in the spring of 2004, Ken Nicol resigned as leader of the Alberta Liberal Party, and Taft was soon elected to replace him. Taft was generally given credit for his tenacity in the legislature. Despite leading a party saddled with a $900,000 debt, he helped his party more than double its seats in the election from 7 before the election call to 16. The Alberta Liberals regained seats in Edmonton, and made a breakthrough in the traditionally conservative city of Calgary. Taft also saw his support in Edmonton Riverview solidify; he received more votes than all other candidates, of any party, in the 2004 election.

He published his third book, Democracy Derailed in 2007. It focussed on what he perceived as the broken state of Alberta's democracy. The book "provides plenty of examples of pettiness and arrogance" from Ralph Klein's government, and criticized the government's record on dealing with whistle blowers. Taft described the situation as "a widespread breakdown of accountability [... that's] become part of the political culture". Taft also suggested 35 ways to fix the problem. Democracy Derailed topped local bestseller lists.

In the 2008 election, the Liberal Party won only nine seats in an election marked for its record low voter turnout. On 26 June 2008, Taft announced that he would step down as leader of the Alberta Liberal Party. He was publicly praised, and thanked for his service to the province. Taft remained as an MLA until the 2012 provincial election, when he did not seek re-election.

=== Post-political career ===
In January 2012, just before leaving office, Taft published Follow the Money, his fourth book. Research for the book was supported by two economists: Professor Melville Macmillan and Dr. Junaid Jahagir. Drawing heavily on economic data from Statistics Canada, the book challenges the notion that the Alberta government's spending on public services is far higher than other provinces. Taft shows that total Alberta corporate profits are consistently double or more the rates in the rest of Canada or the United States. In contrast, spending on public services in Alberta is in the normal range, and the government has failed to increase the value of the Heritage Trust Fund. Like its predecessors, Follow the Money topped local bestseller lists. The book was also shortlisted for the Alberta Book Publishers Association Trade Non-Fiction Book of the Year in 2013.

Between 2011 and 2012, Taft, his wife Jeanette Boman and two other partners designed and constructed a three-home net-zero-ready infill residential project in Edmonton called "Belgravia Green". Boman called it "our one small way of saying we believe that we can make a difference as individuals". The homes are designed and built with the aim of reducing net energy use to near zero. The homes were built by Effect Home Builders, and one of them won the 2012 Canadian Home Builders' Association National Green Home Award.

Taft spent 2012–2017 as volunteer chair of a team overseeing the $1.6 million re-development of Belgravia community hall in Edmonton as a fully accessible, multi-purpose, solar powered community centre.

After his retirement from politics, Taft continues working as an author, consultant, and public speaker while volunteering substantial time in his community.

=== Oil's Deep State ===
In 2014, Taft was invited to spend three weeks at the Whitlam Institute at Western Sydney University in Australia, to write and speak on the effects of the fossil fuel industry on democracy in the context of global warming. In September 2014, he published the paper "Fossil Fuels, Global Warming and Democracy: A Report from a Scene of the Collision", in the Whitlam Institute's Perspectives series.

Developing his ideas further, Taft published his fifth book, Oil’s Deep State: How the Petroleum Industry Undermines Democracy and Stops Action on Global Warming -- in Alberta, and in Ottawa (James Lorimer Publishers), in September 2017. The book, written for a general audience, draws on numerous sources for a wide-ranging look at the effects of Canada's petroleum industry on democratic institutions such as the civil service, political parties and academia. His analysis uses theories of democracy and regulatory capture to advance a theory of the "deep state", arguing that the petroleum industry in Canada has captured so many democratic institutions that it has blocked the capacities of the governments of Alberta and Canada to effectively address global warming. He has toured and spoken extensively in support of his book.

== Electoral record ==
2001 Alberta general election Edmonton Riverview
Party	Candidate	Votes	%	±%
Liberal	Kevin Taft	7,420	49.7	–
Progressive Conservative	Wendy Kinsella	5,883	39.4	–
New Democrat	Doug McLachlan	1,469	9.8	–
Green	Jerry Paschen	165	1.1	–

2004 Alberta general election Edmonton Riverview
Party	Candidate	Votes	%	±%
Liberal	Kevin Taft	10,280	65.5	15.8
Progressive Conservative	Fred Horne	3,575	22.8	-16.6
New Democrat	Donna Martyn	1,058	6.7	-3.1
Green	John Lackey	357	2.3	1.2
Alberta Alliance	David Edgar	313	2.0	–
Social Credit	David Power	116	0.7	–

2008 Alberta general election: Edmonton-Riverview
Party	Candidate	Votes	%	±%
Liberal	Kevin Taft	7,471	50.61	−14.87
Progressive Conservative	Wendy Andrews	5,171	35.03	+12.26
New Democratic	Erica Bullwinkle	1,284	8.70	+1.96
Greens	Cameron Wakefield	506	3.43	+1.16
Wildrose Alliance	Kyle Van Hauwaert	329	2.23	+0.24
Total		14,761		
Rejected, spoiled and declined		36		
Eligible electors		31,130		
Turnout		14,797	47.53	-15.48
Liberal hold		Swing		−13.57
Source(s) The Report on the March 3, 2008 Provincial General Election of the Twenty-seventh Legislative Assembly. Elections Alberta. 28 July 2008. pp. 328–331.

== Bibliography ==
- Oil's Deep State; How the Petroleum Industry Undermines Democracy and Stops Action on Global Warming -- in Alberta, and in Ottawa. James Larimer Publishers. Toronto (2017)
- Follow the Money: Where is Alberta's Wealth Going?. Coauthored with Mel McMillan. Brush Education (2012).
- Democracy Derailed: The Breakdown of Government Accountability in Alberta, and How to Get it Back on Track. Red Deer Press (2007).
- Clear Answers: The Economics and Politics of For-Profit Medicine. Coauthored with Gillian Steward. Duval House Publishing, University of Alberta Press, The Parkland Institute (2000).
- Shredding the Public Interest. University of Alberta Press (1997).
