= Lori Sigurdson =

Canadian politician (born 1961)

The Honourable Lori Sigurdson ECA MLA
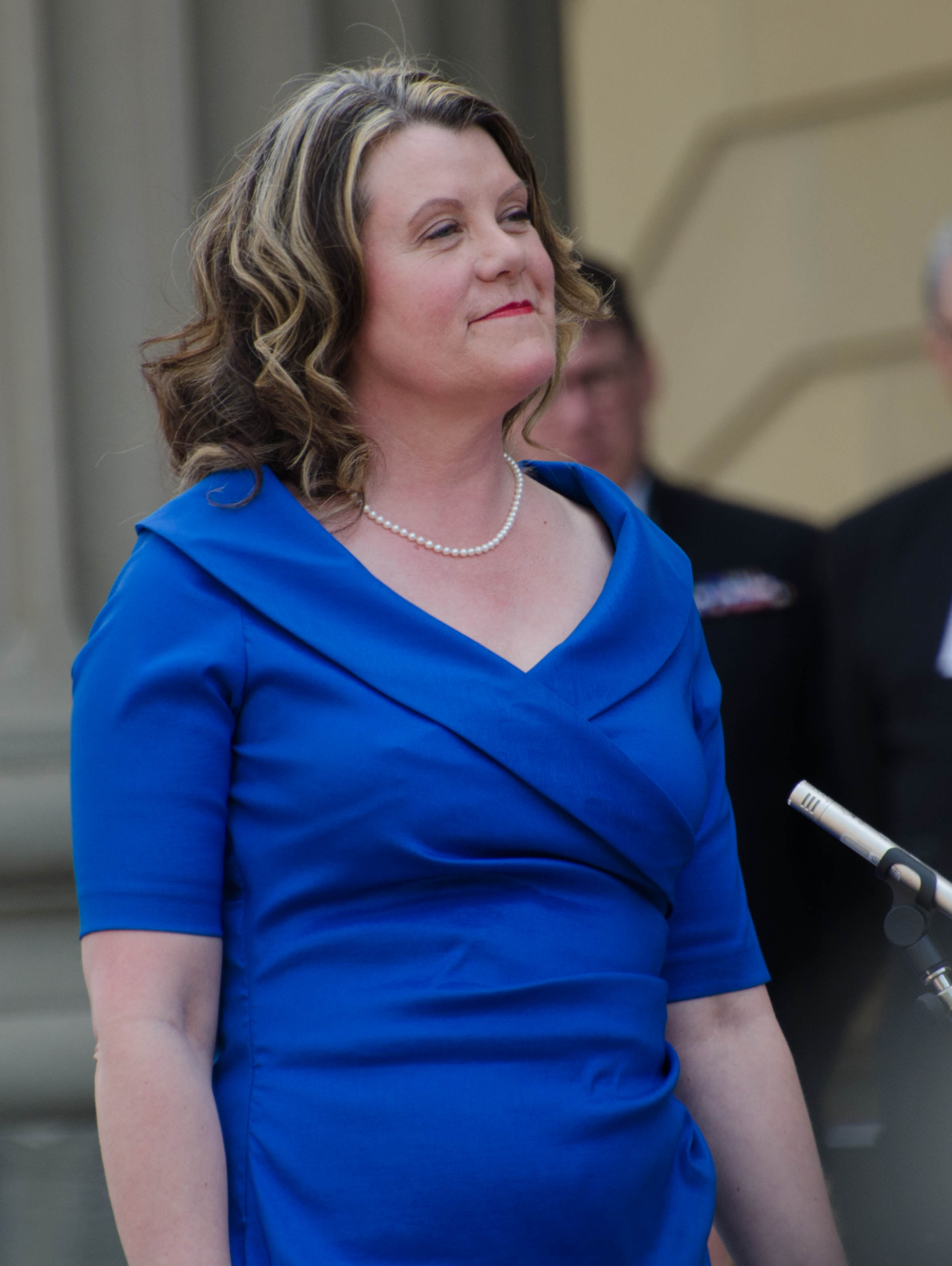
- Sigurdson in May 2015

Alberta Minister of Seniors and Housing
- In office February 2, 2016 – April 30, 2019
- Premier: Rachel Notley
- Preceded by: Jonathan Denis
- Succeeded by: Josephine Pon

Member of the Legislative Assembly of Alberta for Edmonton-Riverview
- Incumbent
- Assumed office May 5, 2015
- Preceded by: Steve Young

Alberta Minister of Labour
- In office May 24, 2015 – February 2, 2016
- Premier: Rachel Notley
- Preceded by: Ric McIver
- Succeeded by: Christina Gray

Personal details
- Born: January 31, 1961 (age 65) Winnipeg, Manitoba
- Party: Alberta New Democratic Party
- Education: University of Alberta (BA); University of Calgary (BSW, MSW)
- Occupation: Social Worker, University instructor, Politician

Lori Dawn Sigurdson (born January 31, 1961, in Winnipeg, Manitoba) is a Canadian politician who was elected in the 2015 Alberta general election to the Legislative Assembly of Alberta representing the electoral district of Edmonton-Riverview. She was Minister of Advanced Education and Minister of Labour from May 24, 2015, to February 2, 2016, and Minister of Seniors and housing until March 20, 2019. MLA Sigurdson was re-elected on April 16, 2019 and in 2023. She was the Official Opposition Critic for Seniors and Housing. As of June 21, 2024, she was the Official Opposition critic for Seniors Issues as well as for Continuing Care and Homecare.

== Personal life ==
Sigurdson holds a Bachelor of Arts in Political Science from the University of Alberta as well as Bachelor and Masters of Social Work degrees from the University of Calgary. Sigurdson served as a social worker, working in child welfare casework as a supervisor in the Government of Alberta public service, a mental health therapist with Alberta Catholic School Services, as well as in community development and social policy. After working in social work for 25 years, Sigurdson was an instructor of social work at the University of Calgary, MacEwan University and NorQuest College.

Sigurdson has also served as the director of the Bissell Centre and the manager of professional affairs for the Alberta College of Social Workers. She was awarded the John Hutton Memorial Award for social action and policy in 2017 for her outstanding contributions to the profession of social work.

== Electoral history ==
=== 2023 general election ===
2023 Alberta general election: Edmonton-Riverview
Party	Candidate	Votes	%	±%
New Democratic	Lori Sigurdson	12,875	67.06	+11.12
United Conservative	Terry Vankka	5,564	28.98	-0.78
Liberal	Eric Champagne	413	2.15	+0.78
Green	Robin George	347	1.81	–
Total		19,199	99.05	–
Rejected and declined		185	0.95	
Turnout		19,384	63.34	
Eligible voters		30,603		
New Democratic hold		Swing		+5.95
Source(s) Source: Elections Alberta

=== 2019 general election ===
2019 Alberta general election: Edmonton-Riverview
Party	Candidate	Votes	%	±%
New Democratic	Lori Sigurdson	12,234	55.9%	-6.88%
United Conservative	Kara Barker	6,508	29.8%	+3.45%
Alberta Party	Katherine O'Neill	2,503	11.4%	+8.87%
Liberal	Indy Randhawa	299	1.4%	-5.94%
Independence	Corey MacFadden	190	0.9%	--
Independent	Rob Bernshaw	135	0.6%	--
Total valid votes		21,869		
Rejected, spoiled and declined		58	70	11
Registered electors and turnout		33,012	66.5%	
New Democratic hold		Swing		
Source(s) "2019 Provincial General Election Results". Elections Alberta.

=== 2015 general election ===
2015 Alberta general election: Edmonton-Riverview
Party	Candidate	Votes	%	±%
New Democratic	Lori Sigurdson	12,108	62.78	+41.64
Progressive Conservative	Steve Young	3,732	19.35	-20.24
Liberal	Donna Wilson	1,416	7.34	-15.49
Wildrose	Ian Crawford	1,350	7.00	-7.78
Alberta Party	Brandon Beringer	487	2.53	+0.87
Green	Sandra Lange	135	0.70	
Independent	Glenn Miller	59	0.31	
Total valid votes		19,287		
Rejected, spoiled, and declined		128		
Registered electors		31,416		
Turnout		19,415	61.80	-2.43
New Democratic gain from Progressive Conservative		Swing		+30.94
Source(s) Elections Alberta. "Electoral Division Results: Edmonton-Riverview".

=== 2012 general election ===
2012 Alberta general election: Edmonton-Riverview
Party	Candidate	Votes	%	±%
Progressive Conservative	Steve Young	7,288	39.59	+4.56
Liberal	Arif Khan	4,202	22.83	-27.78
New Democratic	Lori Sigurdson	3,892	21.14	+12.44
Wildrose	John Corie	2,721	14.78	+12.55
Alberta Party	Timothy Wong	306	1.66	
Total valid votes		18,409		
Rejected, spoiled, and declined		203		
Registered electors		28,975		
Turnout		18,612	64.23	+16.70
Progressive Conservative gain from Liberal		Swing		+16.17
Source(s) Elections Alberta. "Electoral Division Results: Edmonton-Riverview".
