= Hugh MacDonald (Canadian politician) =

Canadian politician

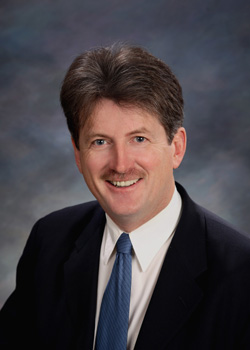

MLA for Edmonton-Gold Bar
- In office March 11, 1997 – April 23, 2012
- Preceded by: Bettie Hewes
- Succeeded by: David Dorward

Personal details
- Born: August 5, 1955 (age 70) Souris, Prince Edward Island, Canada
- Party: Liberal
- Occupation: business owner

Hugh MacDonald (born August 5, 1955) is a Canadian politician, who represented the electoral district of Edmonton-Gold Bar in the Legislative Assembly of Alberta. He is a member of the Alberta Liberal Party. On September 27, 2011, he announced he would not seek re-election.

== Background ==
Born August 5, 1955, he spent 20 years working in Alberta's petroleum industry as a boilermaker and small business owner prior to becoming an MLA.

== Political career ==
MacDonald was first elected as a Member of the Alberta Legislature in the general election of 1997. He was elected to his second term for Edmonton-Gold Bar on March 12, 2001, his third on November 22, 2004, and, most recently, to his fourth term on March 3, 2008. In addition, MacDonald was the critic for Advanced Education and Technology, Employment and Immigration and Infrastructure.

MacDonald served as chair of the Public Accounts Committee and as a member of the following committees:

Alberta Heritage Savings Trust Fund Legislative Offices Committee Private Bills Committee Standing Committee on Public Safety and Services Select Special Chief Electoral Officer Search Committee

He has served as chair of the Standing Committee on Public Accounts and as a member of the Select Special Ethics Commissioner Search Committee and the Personal Information Protection Act Review Committee. MacDonald has also served as the Official Opposition critic for Agriculture, Food and Rural Development, Energy, the Heritage Savings Trust Fund, Human Resources and Employment and Government Services.

Additionally, he has served as a member of the standing committees on Law and Regulations and Privileges and Elections, Standing Orders and Printing. MacDonald has assumed Official Opposition critic positions including:

Critic responsible for Employment and Immigration Critic responsible for Infrastructure

In 2011, MacDonald ran for leader of the Alberta Liberal Party, coming second to Raj Sherman.

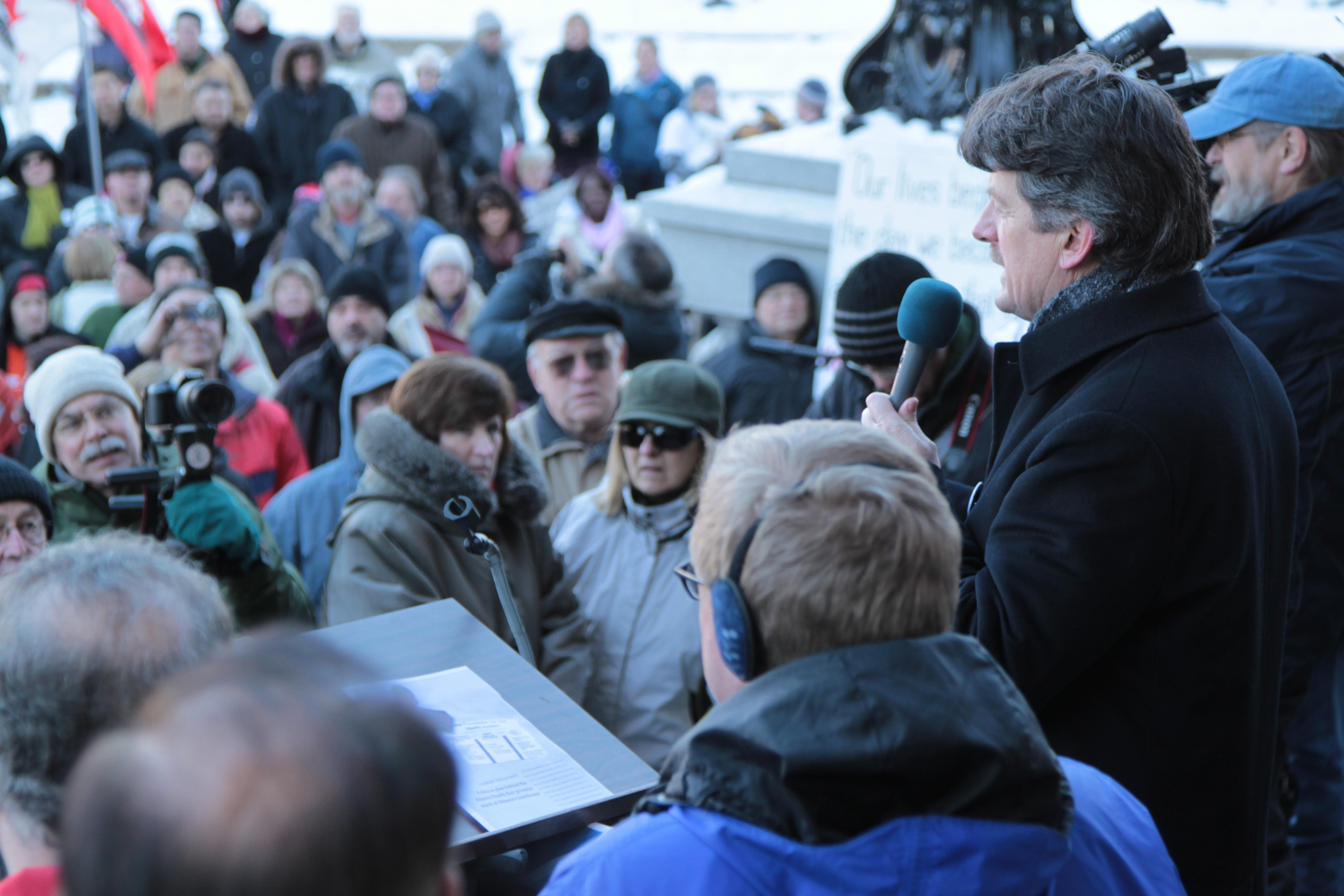
Liberal MLA Hugh MacDonald
