= Alberta Greens =

Former political party in Alberta, Canada

- Former provincial party
- Founded: 1986
- Dissolved: July 16, 2009
- Succeeded by: Evergreen Party of Alberta
- Ideology: Green politics
- National affiliation: Green Party of Canada
- Colours: Green

Website
- albertagreens.ca

The Alberta Greens, also known as the Green Party of Alberta, was a provincial political party in the province of Alberta, Canada.

The Alberta Greens were formed in 1986 and received official party status on April 6, 1990. The party was affiliated with Green parties throughout the world, and with the federal Green Party of Canada.

The party had been polling between 3% and 9% from 2006 to 2009. The party often polled ahead of the Wildrose Alliance Party of Alberta and had also placed third in two polls done by Leger Marketing and the Strategic Counsel ahead of both the Wildrose Party and Alberta New Democratic Party.

The party dissolved in July 2009 at the request of the new executive when it was unable to file financial returns with Elections Alberta as required by law. The party executive established a non-profit association in hopes of re-establishing the party after the next election.

== Foundation ==
Norman Conrad ran for the Calgary Centre seat in the House of Commons of Canada as a Green Party of Canada candidate in the 1988 federal election. He placed fifth out of seven candidates with 670 votes.

After the federal election, Conrad and his supporters believed there should be a Green Party registered on the provincial level. He led the effort to get the Alberta Greens registered by Elections Alberta. After the party became registered in 1990 he moved out of the province.

== The last years of the party ==
The Alberta Greens elected a new leader, George Read, in November 2003. Read has a degree in political science from the University of Calgary. He also served as the President of the Federal Green Party in Alberta from 2001 to 2003, and as the National Campaign Manager for the Green Party of Canada from 2005 to 2006.

In the 2004 provincial election, the Greens' support increased by nearly 1000%. 49 ridings had Green candidates, where three candidates received more than 1,000 votes, and one candidate in the riding of Banff-Cochrane, received 15% of the vote, While Edwin Erickson was the only candidate to place second in the Drayton Valley-Calmar riding. Eleven others broke the 5% threshold that had previously been a barrier for Green support.

Polling done by various research companies during and leading up to the 2008 provincial election put the Alberta Greens anywhere between 5% and 9%. The Greens had also polled as high as 22% or second place in Northern Alberta during the campaign. The party ran almost a full slate in the 2008 provincial election for the first time in party history and also fielded 18 more candidates than the newly formed Wildrose Alliance Party which had a seat in the previous legislature.

In the 2008 election, the Greens captured 4.6% of the vote, gaining more than 1.8%. The Greens were also the only opposition party to rise in popular support on election night, The Greens ran on a budget of just under $110,000. The Greens had hoped for a breakthrough, but because of increased Conservative support were unable to achieve this. The best results came from Lacombe-Ponoka 22.9%, Drayton Valley-Calmar 19.3%, and Banff-Cochrane 14.1%. Another accomplishment in 2008 was having more than 2/3 of Green candidates placing fourth or better, compared to just half in 2004. Despite this rise in popular support, the party went from 5.5% in 2004 to 4.9% in 2008 in the city of Calgary.

Fair Vote Canada released a press release shortly after election night, stating that if proportional representation had been used, the Greens would have had four seats instead of zero.

On September 27, 2008, at the regular annual general meeting, the party was subject to what has been described as an attempted takeover. The party executive, with a quorum of members, decided to end the meeting and move it to a time that would allow broader participation by the membership, increased notice for proposed changes, and increased transparency in the issues being brought forward. Another meeting was held the same day, in the same location, and chaired by Sean Maw (who was not a member of the party executive at the time of the meeting). At that second meeting, voting was conducted on executive positions and constitutional amendments. Both sides of the contention claimed their meeting to be valid and the other not, leading to a dispute about the legitimate leadership of the party.

In December 2008, longtime party leader George Read chose to withdraw his claim to leadership, leaving Joe Anglin the interim leader.

In the spring of 2009, deputy leader Edwin Erickson quit the Greens to become involved with the renewal of the Alberta Party.

On April 1, 2009, the executive of the Party failed to file an Annual Financial Statement with Elections Alberta, as required by law. As a result, the party was deregistered on July 16, 2009, and would be unable to run candidates in the next election.

== Attempt to re-found the party ==
Following the de-registration of the party, a new independent group dedicated to 'Green Principles' formed the Vision 2012 Society, as required by Elections Alberta, in order to form a new party. The Vision 2012 Society held an annual general meeting on June 25, 2011, in Red Deer to elect an executive, and to raise a petition asking Elections Alberta to register the "Evergreen Party of Alberta". The Evergreen Party of Alberta later voted to change its name to the Green Party of Alberta in 2012.

== 2008 platform ==
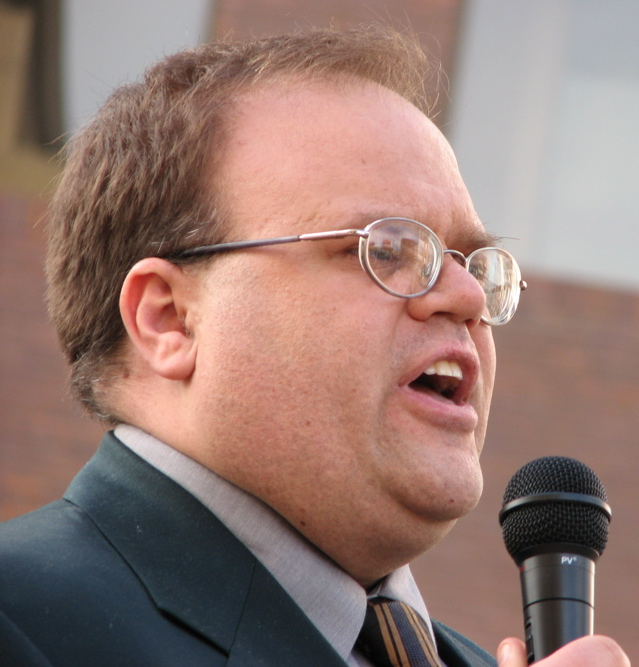
George Read, Leader of the Alberta Greens during the 2008 general election

In the party's last election platform, the Alberta Greens highlighted subsidized housing and paid tuition for health-care students in the launch of their 2008 election platform.

To tackle affordable housing in the province, the Greens proposed a model of subsidized housing used in Vancouver. In Vancouver they built subsidized housing and then they've given it to housing co-operatives or non-profit organizations to maintain.

On health care, the Greens said they would pay the tuition of those studying to become health-care professionals — if they promise to remain in the province for seven years after they graduate.

The party proposed to institute a province-wide transportation plan focusing on rail lines, including light-rail transit between Calgary and Edmonton, and an upgrade of the rail line to Fort McMurray because they use 20 per cent less fuel than vehicles on roads.

Other platform promises included:

- Increasing the number of doctors in the province (thus decreasing hospital waiting times) by paying the university tuition fees for health care workers who stay in the province for seven years.
- Diversifying Alberta's energy economy by supporting renewable resource technology such as solar, wind and geothermal energy.
- Ensuring the lowest post secondary tuition fees in Canada.
- Establishing fixed dates for provincial elections and the right to recall MLAs.

The theme for the campaign was 'Making Albertans Happier, Healthier and Wealthier'.

== Election results ==
Election	Leader	Candidates	Votes	%	Seats	+/-	Position	Government
1993	Betty Paschen	11 / 83	1,995	0.20%	0 / 83	0	▲8th	—
1997	David Parker	7 / 83	1,039	0.11%	0 / 83	0	▲6th	—
2001	David Parker	10 / 83	2,085	0.28%	0 / 83	0	6th	—
2004	George Read	49 / 83	24,588	2.75%	0 / 83	0	▲5th	—
2008	George Read	79 / 83	43,563	4.58%	0 / 83	0	5th	—
See Green Party of Alberta 2012-present

Source: "Elections Alberta"

== Leaders ==
- Norman Conrad (1987–1990)
- Betty Paschen (1990–1995)
- David Parker (1995–2003)
- George Read (2003–2008)
- Joe Anglin Interim Leader (2008–2009)

== See also ==
- List of Green party leaders in Canada
- List of political parties in Alberta
- List of Alberta general elections
- List of Green politicians who have held office in Canada
