= Calgary-Beddington =

Provincial electoral district in Alberta, Canada

Alberta electoral district
- Calgary-Beddington within the City of Calgary (2017 boundaries)

Provincial electoral district
- Legislature: Legislative Assembly of Alberta
MLA
Amanda Chapman
New Democratic
- District created: 2017
- First contested: 2019
- Last contested: 2023

Demographics
- Population (2016): 50,220
- Area (km²): 27.6
- Pop. density (per km²): 1,819.6

Calgary-Beddington is a provincial electoral district in the city of Calgary, Alberta, Canada. The district is one of 87 districts mandated to return a single member (MLA) to the Legislative Assembly of Alberta using the first past the post method of voting. The seat has been held by Amanda Chapman of the New Democratic Party since the 2023 Alberta election.

== Geography ==
The district is located in northern Calgary, containing the neighbourhoods of Huntington Hills, Beddington Heights, Sandstone Valley, Country Hills, MacEwan, and Hidden Valley. The riding also includes Nose Hill Park, which lies to the south and west of the residential areas.

== History ==
Members for Calgary-Beddington
Assembly	Years	Member	Party
See Calgary-Mackay-Nose Hill 2012–2019
30th	2019–2023	Josephine Pon	United Conservative
31st	2023–present	Amanda Chapman	New Democratic

The Calgary-Beddington electoral district was created in 2017 when the Electoral Boundaries Commission recommended renaming Calgary-Mackay-Nose Hill and changing its shape, removing its northern area but adding neighbourhoods from Calgary-Foothills and Calgary-Northern Hills. The Commission chose the name Beddington for this district because it "would most readily identify its location to residents in Calgary." The boundaries of the new electoral district in 2017 would have a population of 50,220, 7% above the provincial average of 46,803.

In the 2019 Alberta general election, United Conservative Party candidate Josephine Pon would defeat NDP candidate Amanda Chapman by 3,807 votes. Pon gained the nomination for the Calgary-Beddington electoral district after Randy Kerr was removed by the UCP for failure to be "forthcoming" during the Alberta Election Commissioner's investigation into the Jeff Callaway leadership campaign for the UCP. On April 30, 2019, Premier Jason Kenney would appoint Pon to Cabinet as the Minister of Seniors and Housing.

Pon was unseated by Amanda Chapman from the NDP in the 2023 Alberta general election.

== Electoral results ==
2023 Alberta general election
Party	Candidate	Votes	%	±%
New Democratic	Amanda Chapman	10,269	49.66	+13.95
United Conservative	Josephine Pon	9,726	47.04	-6.07
Alberta Party	Wayne Jackson	473	2.29	-5.93
Liberal	Zarnab Shahid Zafar	210	1.02	-0.67
Total		20,678	99.32	–
Rejected and declined		142	0.68	
Turnout		20,820	58.28	
Eligible voters		35,724		
New Democratic gain from United Conservative		Swing		+10.01
Source(s) Source: Elections Alberta

2019 Alberta general election
Party	Candidate	Votes	%	±%	Expenditures
United Conservative	Josephine Pon	11,625	53.11	-3.74	$31,776
New Democratic	Amanda Chapman	7,818	35.71	-0.93	$15,589
Alberta Party	Carol-Lynn Darch	1,799	8.22	–	$2,014
Liberal	Chandan Tadavalkar	370	1.69	-2.91	$1,651
Alberta Independence	Tom Grbich	161	0.74	–	$500
Independent	Alexander Dea	117	0.53	–	$1,101
Total		21,890	99.53	–	
Rejected, spoiled and declined		103	0.47	–	
Turnout		21,993	63.12		
Eligible voters		34,845			
United Conservative notional hold		Swing		-1.41	
Source(s) Source: Elections Alberta Note: Expenses is the sum of "Election Expenses", "Other Expenses" and "Transfers Issued". The Elections Act limits "Election Expenses" to $50,000.

Redistributed results, 2015 Alberta general election
Party	Votes	%
New Democratic	6,982	36.64
Progressive Conservative	5,547	29.11
Wildrose	5,286	27.74
Liberal	876	4.60
Green	364	1.91
Source(s) Source: Ridingbuilder

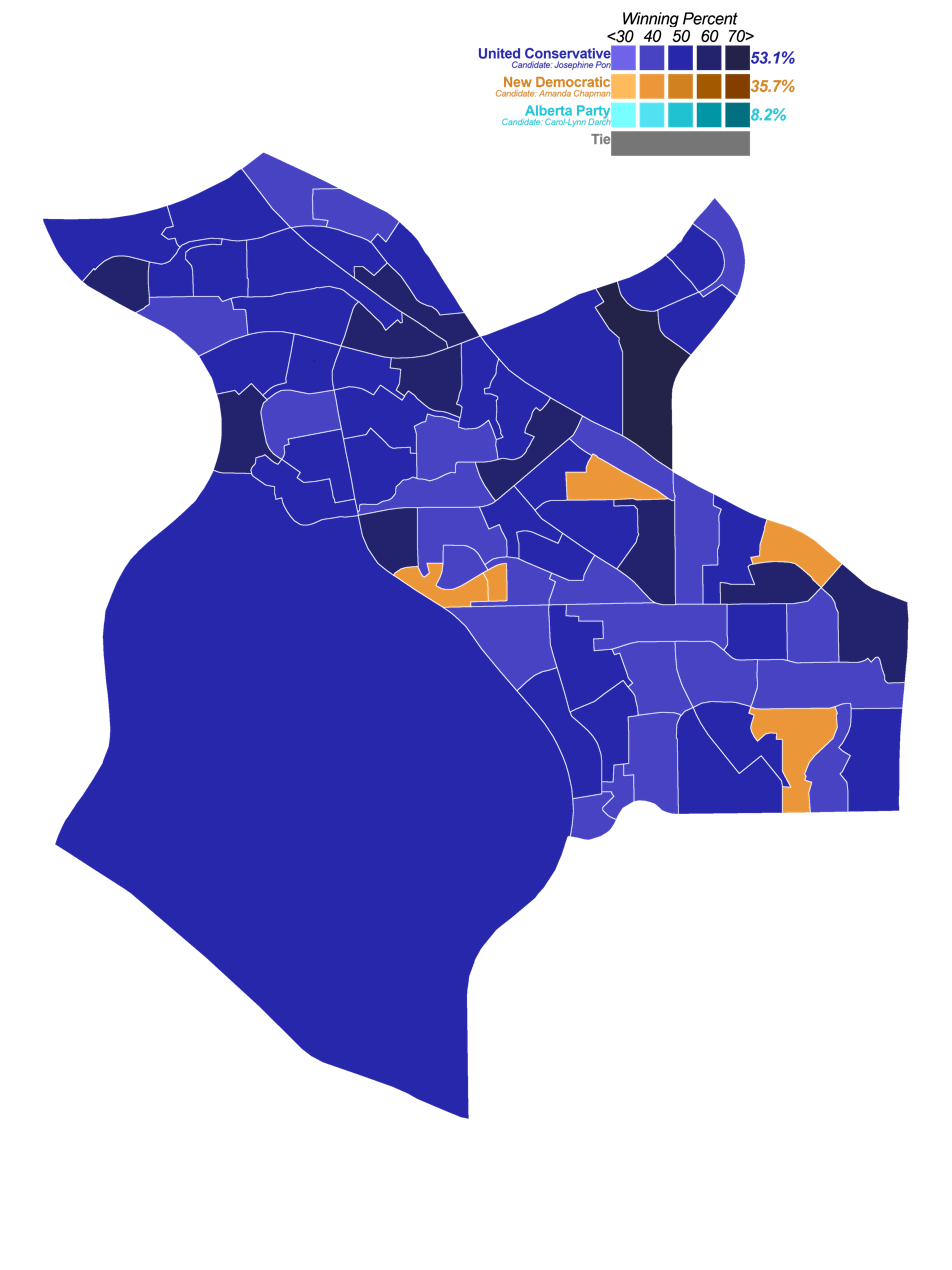
Results by polling division

== See also ==
- List of Alberta provincial electoral districts
- Canadian provincial electoral districts
