= Stewart McCrae (politician) =

Canadian politician

Member of the Legislative Assembly of Alberta
- In office 1973–1982
- Preceded by: Len Werry
- Succeeded by: Janet Koper
- Constituency: Calgary-Foothills

Minister without Portfolio Responsible for Calgary affairs
- In office March 1975 – March 1979

Minister of Government Services
- In office March 1979 – November 1982
- Preceded by: Horst Schmid
- Succeeded by: Pat Nelson

Personal details
- Born: Stewart Alden McCrae; December 30, 1929 Gladstone, Manitoba
- Died: September 2, 2015 (aged 85) Calgary, Alberta
- Party: Progressive Conservative

Stewart Alden McCrae (December 30, 1929 – September 2, 2015) was a provincial level politician from Alberta, Canada. He served as a member of the Legislative Assembly of Alberta from 1973 to 1982 sitting with the governing Progressive Conservative caucus. During his time in office he served a couple different cabinet portfolio's in the Peter Lougheed government.

== Early life ==
Stewart Alden McCrae was born in 1929 and raised in Gladstone, Manitoba. He grew up in the province and went to the University of Manitoba to complete his post secondary education, attaining a degree in Law. He articled in Winnipeg, Manitoba at the lawfirm of Tallin & Kristiansen. He moved to Calgary in 1957 and started work as a Division Land Manager for a petroleum company. He had three kids and also served as President of the Brentwood Home and School Association.

== Political career ==
McCrae ran for election to the Alberta Legislature in a by-election held in the electoral district of Calgary-Foothills. He defeated Social Credit leader Werner Schmidt and three other candidates in a closely contested race to win his seat. He ran for re-election a couple years later in the 1975 Alberta general election doubling his vote and defeating five other candidates in a landslide.

After the provincial election McCrae was appointed to the Executive Council of Alberta by Premier Peter Lougheed. He became a Minister without Portfolio responsible for Calgary affairs. McRae ran for a third term in the 1979 Alberta general election. His popular vote dropped quite a bit from his 1975 result, he still however won a landslide victory.

McCrae became the Minister of Government Services in 1979 and held that portfolio until he retired from provincial politics at dissolution of the assembly in 1982. He died on September 2, 2015, in Calgary, Alberta from cancer.
