= Karen McPherson =

Canadian politician (born 1966)

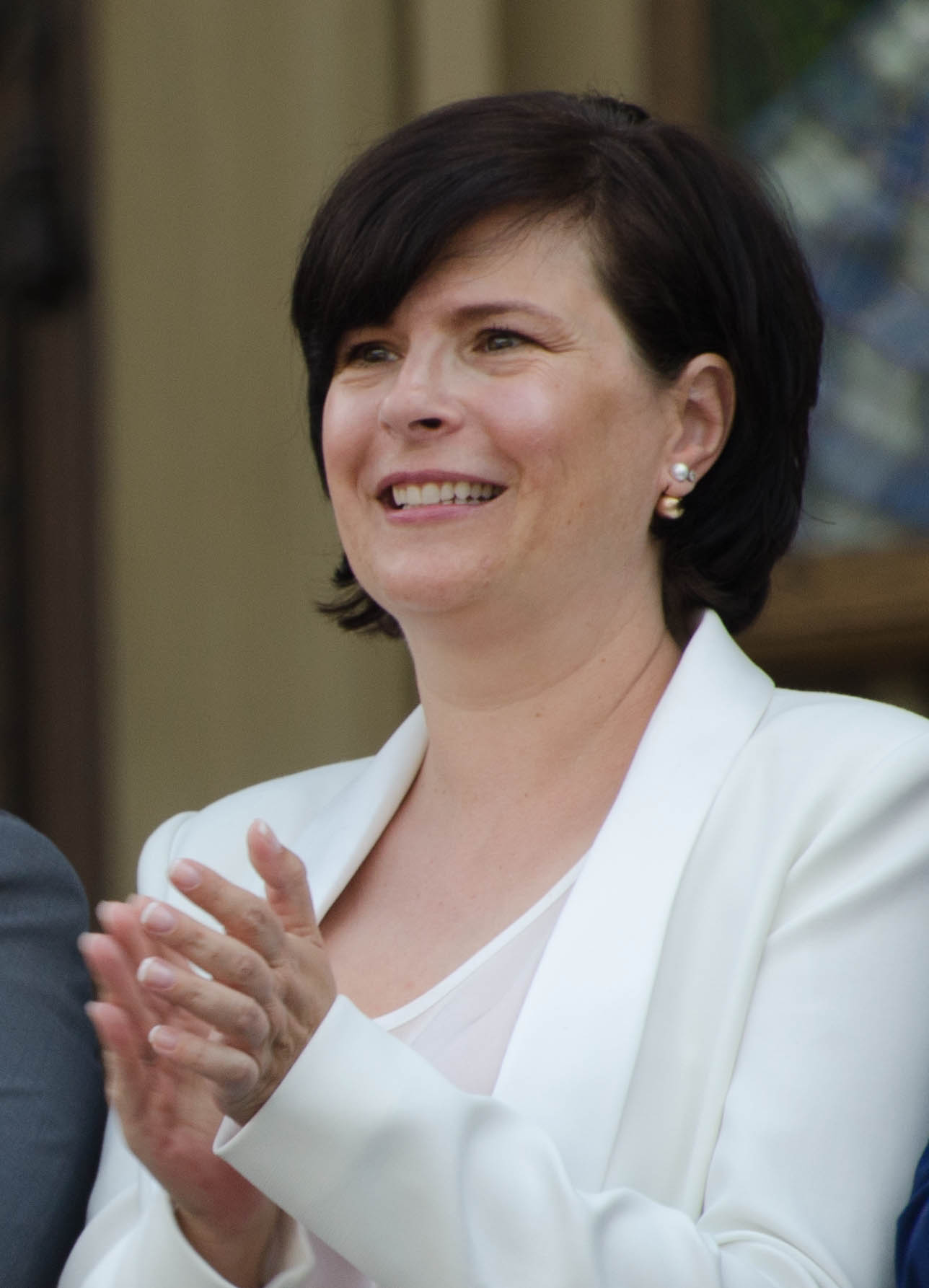
- McPherson in May 2015

Member of the Legislative Assembly of Alberta for Calgary-Mackay-Nose Hill
- In office May 5, 2015 – March 19, 2019
- Preceded by: Neil Brown
- Succeeded by: district abolished

Personal details
- Born: 1966 or 1967 (age 58–59) Edmonton, Alberta
- Party: Alberta Party (2017-present)
- Other political affiliations: New Democratic (2015–2017)
- Occupation: Business Analyst/Entrepreneur

Karen Margaret McPherson (born 1966) is a Canadian politician who was elected in the 2015 Alberta general election to the Legislative Assembly of Alberta representing the electoral district of Calgary-Mackay-Nose Hill with a plurality of votes under the first-past-the-post system. On October 4, 2017, McPherson announced she was leaving the NDP to sit as an Independent. Weeks later, she announced that she was joining the caucus of the Alberta Party, becoming its second MLA.

In March 2019 she announced that she would not seek re-election. She was succeeded by United Conservative Josephine Pon; the Alberta Party candidate took less than 9% of the votes.

== Electoral history ==
=== 2015 general election ===
2015 Alberta general election: Calgary-Mackay-Nose Hill
Party	Candidate	Votes	%	±%
New Democratic	Karen McPherson	6,177	36.86%	30.94%
Wildrose	Kathy Macdonald	4,914	29.32%	-9.07%
Progressive Conservative	Neil Brown	4,585	27.36%	-19.11%
Liberal	Prab Lashar	768	4.58%	-3.19%
Green	Sandy Kevin Aberdeen	316	1.89%	–
Total		16,760	–	–
Rejected, spoiled and declined		91	–	–
Eligible electors / turnout		34,487	48.86%	-0.05%
New Democratic gain from Progressive Conservative		Swing		-0.27%
Source(s) Source: "19 - Calgary-Mackay-Nose Hill Official Results 2015 Alberta general election". officialresults.elections.ab.ca. Elections Alberta.

== Advocacy ==
Bill 2, An Act to Remove Barriers for Survivors of Sexual and Domestic Violence, was introduced by NDP MLA Kathleen Ganley on March 7, 2017. If passed, Bill 2 would allow survivors of sexual assault and sexual misconduct who wish to sure their attackers to file civil claims at any point, removing the standard two-year deadline for civil actions.

In April 2017, during the Second Reading of Bill 2, Karen McPherson spoke publicly about her experience with sexual violence and spoke in support of Bill 2. This was the first time MLA McPherson spoke publicly about her lived experience with sexual violence.
