= Calgary-Edgemont =

Provincial electoral district in Alberta, Canada

Alberta electoral district
- Calgary-Edgemont within the City of Calgary (2017 boundaries)

Provincial electoral district
- Legislature: Legislative Assembly of Alberta
MLA
Julia Hayter
New Democratic
- District created: 2017
- First contested: 2019
- Last contested: 2023

Demographics
- Population (2016): 50,803
- Area (km²): 19.2
- Pop. density (per km²): 2,646

Calgary-Edgemont is a provincial electoral district in Alberta, Canada. The district is one of 87 districts mandated to return a single member (MLA) to the Legislative Assembly of Alberta using the first past the post method of voting. It was contested for the first time in the 2019 Alberta election.

== Geography ==
The district is located in northwestern Calgary, containing the neighbourhoods of Dalhousie, Edgemont, Ranchlands, Hawkwood, and Hamptons.

== History ==
Members for Calgary-Edgemont
Assembly	Years	Member	Party
See Calgary-Hawkwood 2012–2019
30th	2019–2023	Prasad Panda	UCP
31st	2023–present	Julia Hayter	NDP

The district was created in 2017 when the Electoral Boundaries Commission recommended renaming Calgary-Hawkwood and shifting its boundaries eastward into Calgary-Foothills and Calgary-Varsity, losing the Silver Springs, Citadel and Arbour Lake neighbourhoods while gaining Dalhousie, Edgemont, and Hamptons. The riding is one of the more populous districts created in this redistribution, resulting from the commission's decision not to divide any of its communities.

== Electoral results ==
=== 2023 ===
2023 Alberta general election
Party	Candidate	Votes	%	±%
New Democratic	Julia Hayter	11,681	49.30	+15.27
United Conservative	Prasad Panda	11,397	48.10	-4.75
Alberta Party	Allen Schultz	488	2.06	-8.82
Wildrose Loyalty Coalition	Nan Barron	66	0.28	–
Solidarity Movement	Miles Williams	64	0.27	–
Total		23,696	99.23	–
Rejected and declined		184	0.77	
Turnout		23,880	65.75	
Eligible voters		36,322		
New Democratic gain from United Conservative		Swing		+10.01
Source(s) Source: Elections Alberta

=== 2019 ===
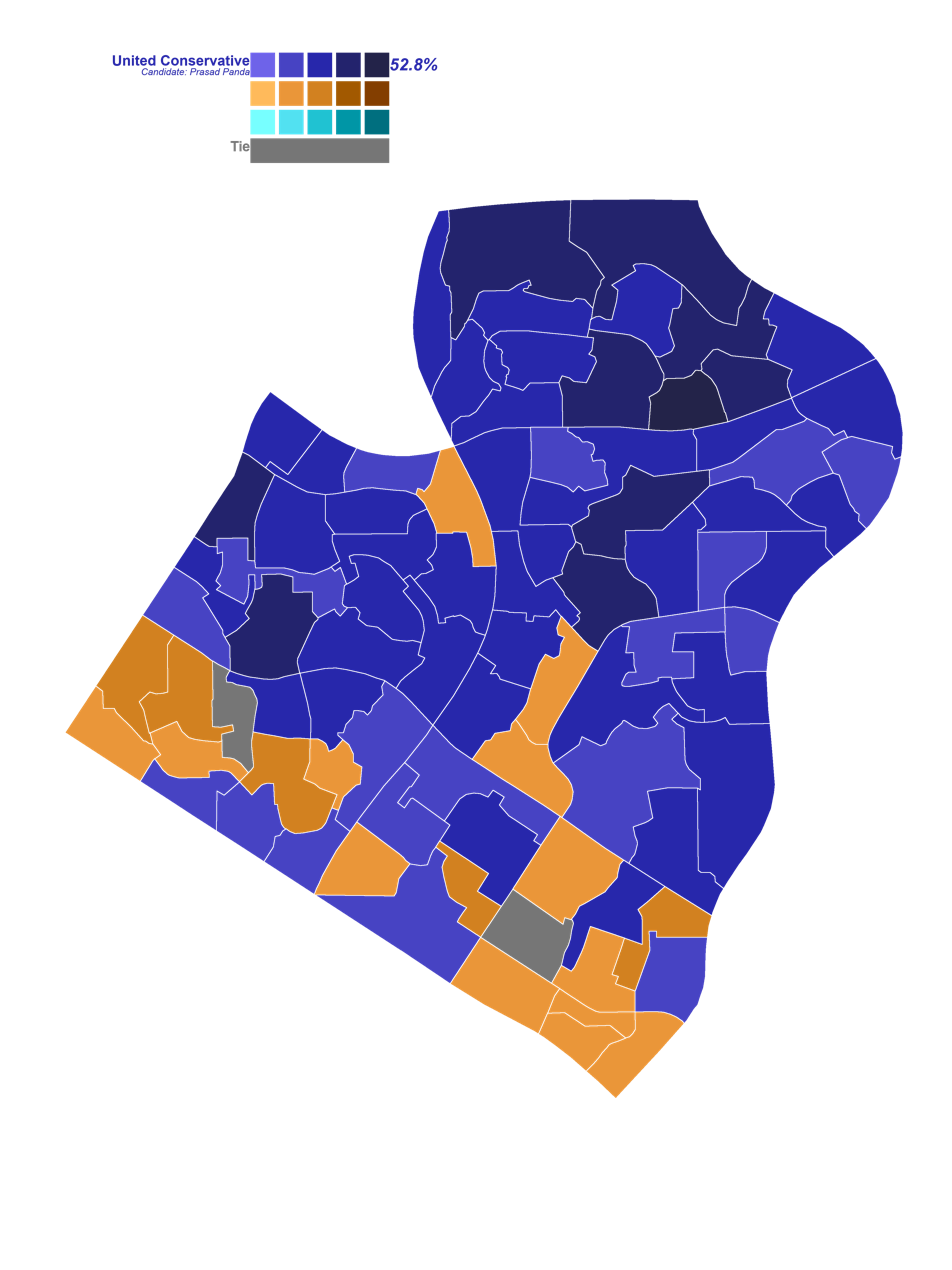
Results by Polling Division

2019 Alberta general election
Party	Candidate	Votes	%	±%	Expenditures
United Conservative	Prasad Panda	13,308	52.84	-3.19	$60,021
New Democratic	Julia Hayter	8,570	34.03	+0.53	$40,725
Alberta Party	Joanne Gui	2,740	10.88	+9.12	$39,339
Liberal	Graeme Maitland	305	1.21	-5.15	$500
Green	Carl Svoboda	155	0.62	-1.57	$500
Alberta Independence	Tomasz Kochanowicz	106	0.42	–	$852
Total		25,184	98.83	–	
Rejected, spoiled and declined		299	1.17		
Turnout		25,483	70.11		
Eligible voters		36,346			
United Conservative notional hold		Swing		-1.86	
Source(s) Source: Elections Alberta Note: Expenses is the sum of "Election Expenses", "Other Expenses" and "Transfers Issued". The Elections Act limits "Election Expenses" to $50,000.

=== 2015 ===
Redistributed results, 2015 Alberta election
Party	Votes	%
Progressive Conservative	7,983	38.28
New Democratic	6,986	33.50
Wildrose	3,706	17.75
Liberal	1,326	6.36
Green	456	2.19
Alberta Party	366	1.76
Social Credit	35	0.17
Source(s) Source: Ridingbuilder

== See also ==
- List of Alberta provincial electoral districts
- Canadian provincial electoral districts
