= Jamie Kleinsteuber =

Canadian politician

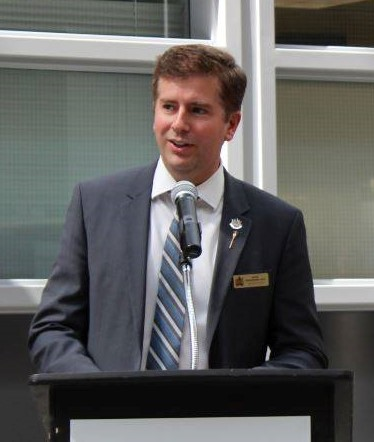
- Kleinsteuber at The HYRS Program - 2017

Member of the Legislative Assembly of Alberta for Calgary-Northern Hills
- In office May 5, 2015 – March 19, 2019
- Preceded by: Teresa Woo-Paw
- Succeeded by: district abolished

Personal details
- Born: Kingston, Ontario, Canada
- Party: Alberta New Democratic Party
- Occupation: Airline employee

Jamie Kleinsteuber is a Canadian politician who was elected in the 2015 Alberta general election to the Legislative Assembly of Alberta, representing the electoral district of Calgary-Northern Hills.

== Political career ==
Kleinsteuber moved to Cochrane, Alberta in 2010 and became active in politics. He ran in the 2012 Alberta general election as the Alberta NDP candidate for Banff-Cochrane. In 2015, he moved to the Panorama Hills neighbourhood in Calgary, and ran in the 2015 Alberta general election - winning the seat in Calgary-Northern Hills, when the provincial NDP swept to a majority.

Kleinsteuber served as member of the Standing Committee on Private Bills, the Standing Committee on Resource Stewardship, and the Standing Committee on Legislative Offices (including the Select Special Ombudsman and Public Interest Commissioner Search Committee & the Select Special Auditor General Search Committee).

=== Community Advocacy as MLA ===
==== North Calgary High School ====
The community of Northern Hills in Calgary had been expecting a high school to be built for over a decade. In 2015, North Calgary High was in position #27 on the CBE: Three-Year School Capital Plan 2015–2018. Kleinsteuber advocated for the high school with engaged families, the Northern Hills Community Association and parents in the Advocates for North Calgary High School. In 2019, North Calgary High was in position #3 on the CBE: Three-Year School Capital Plan 2019–2022, and received Design Funding for a new Calgary High School (Coventry Hills), CBE, Grades 10–12.

==== Vivo for Healthier Generations Expansion ====
Reaching near capacity, Vivo for Healthier Generations (a not-for-profit community recreation centre in NE Calgary) had been advocating for an investment to help the facility expand by adding on to its existing facilities. Kleinsteuber joined with Vivo for Healthier Generations, and other community members, to secure provincial funding in the form of a $15 million investment over three years to aid in expanding the facility by 50%.

==== Coventry Hills Elementary ====
Coventry Hills/Country Hills Village Elementary (now, Northern Lights School) was considered an urgent priority, and Kleinsteuber joined Finance Minister Joe Ceci to announce the funding of four new elementary schools in March 2017.

==== Calgary Green Line Funding to North Pointe ====
As a strong advocate for public transportation, Kleinsteuber supported the Calgary Green Line project by working with the Northern Hills Community Association and the LRT on the Green Foundation to ensure the project extended all the way to North Pointe.

While the commitment of $1.53-billion by the province was only designated for the first phase of the Green Line, Transportation and Infrastructure Minister Brian Mason did not rule out future funding in order to complete a further 26 kilometres to North Pointe terminal.

== Personal life ==
Kleinsteuber was born in Kingston, Ontario and grew up in Wellington, Ontario.

He graduated from the Prince Edward Collegiate Institute, Picton, Ontario.

After high school, he moved to Ottawa to attend university. During his studies at the University of Ottawa, he began his career in the airline industry.

Kleinsteuber graduated in May 1999 with a Bachelor of Arts (Conc. History/ Conc. Public Policy and Public Management).

== Electoral history ==
2015 Alberta general election: Calgary-Northern Hills
Party	Candidate	Votes	%
New Democratic	Jamie Kleinsteuber	6,641	38.2
Progressive Conservative	Teresa Woo-Paw	5,343	30.7
Wildrose	Prasad Panda	4,392	25.3
Liberal	Harry Lin	1,000	5.8
Total valid votes		17,376	100.0
Rejected, spoiled and declined		160	
Turnout		17,536	46.1
Eligible voters		38,004	
Source: Elections Alberta

2012 Alberta general election: Banff-Cochrane
Party	Candidate	Votes	%	±%
Progressive Conservative	Ron Casey	6,632	41.82%	-7.52%
Wildrose	Tom Copithorne	5,933	37.41%	–
Liberal	Peter Helfrich	2,234	14.09%	-14.65%
New Democratic	Jamie Kleinsteuber	1,059	6.68%	0.68%
Total		15,858	–	–
Rejected, spoiled and declined		135	–	–
Eligible electors / turnout		28,663	55.80%	18.48%
Progressive Conservative hold		Swing		-8.10%
Source(s) Source: "49 - Banff-Cochrane Official Results 2012 Alberta general election". Elections Alberta.
