= Julia Hayter =

Canadian politician from Alberta

Julia Hayter MLA
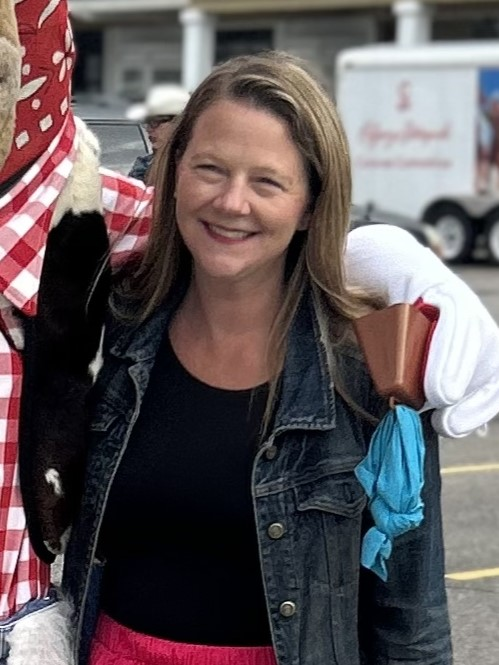
- Hayter in 2023

Member of the Legislative Assembly of Alberta for Calgary-Edgemont
- Incumbent
- Assumed office May 29, 2023
- Preceded by: Prasad Panda

Personal details
- Born: November 28, 1974 (age 51) Edmonton, Alberta, Canada
- Party: NDP
- Education: College of New Caledonia
- Occupation: Education assistant

Julia Hayter is Canadian politician from the Alberta New Democratic Party who was elected as a Member of the Legislative Assembly of Alberta for Calgary-Edgemont in the 2023 Alberta general election.

== Life and career ==
Hayter received a developmental disability certificate from the College of New Caledonia in Prince George, British Columbia.

Hayter has worked extensively on election campaigns around the Calgary area, as well as having worked as a constituency assistant for a Member of the Legislative Assembly of Alberta.

== Work in the community ==
MLA Hayter has an ongoing period poverty drive raising awareness for menstrual inequality. “Access to period products is a basic necessity and should not be considered a luxury.”

== Provincial politics ==
During the Fall sitting of the 31st legislative session, Hayter sponsored Motion 503, which addressed universal access to free prescription contraception. Hayter introduced Bill 208, The Psycho-Educational Assessment Act The bill was intended to address issues relating to access to psycho-educational assessments by creating a school psychological services committee.

== Electoral history ==
2023 Alberta general election: Calgary-Edgemont
Party	Candidate	Votes	%	±%
New Democratic	Julia Hayter	11,681	49.30	+15.27
United Conservative	Prasad Panda	11,397	48.10	-4.75
Alberta Party	Allen Schultz	488	2.06	-8.82
Wildrose Loyalty Coalition	Nan Barron	66	0.28	–
Solidarity Movement	Miles Williams	64	0.27	–
Total		23,696	99.23	–
Rejected and declined		184	0.77	
Turnout		23,880	65.75	
Eligible voters		36,322		
New Democratic gain from United Conservative		Swing		+10.01
Source(s) Source: Elections Alberta

2019 Alberta general election: Calgary-Edgemont
Party	Candidate	Votes	%	±%	Expenditures
United Conservative	Prasad Panda	13,308	52.84	-3.19	$60,021
New Democratic	Julia Hayter	8,570	34.03	+0.53	$40,725
Alberta Party	Joanne Gui	2,740	10.88	+9.12	$39,339
Liberal	Graeme Maitland	305	1.21	-5.15	$500
Green	Carl Svoboda	155	0.62	-1.57	$500
Alberta Independence	Tomasz Kochanowicz	106	0.42	–	$852
Total		25,184	98.83	–	
Rejected, spoiled and declined		299	1.17		
Turnout		25,483	70.11		
Eligible voters		36,346			
United Conservative notional hold		Swing		-1.86	
Source(s) Source: Elections Alberta Note: Expenses is the sum of "Election Expenses", "Other Expenses" and "Transfers Issued". The Elections Act limits "Election Expenses" to $50,000.
