= Calvin Lee =

Canadian politician (born 1939)

Calvin Everett Lee

Member of the Legislative Assembly of Alberta
- In office 1971–1975
- Preceded by: New district
- Succeeded by: Eric Musgreave
- Constituency: Calgary-McKnight

Personal details
- Born: August 19, 1939 (age 86) Birsay, Saskatchewan
- Party: Progressive Conservative
- Occupation: politician

Calvin Everett Lee (born August 19, 1939) was a provincial level politician from Alberta, Canada. He served as a member of the Legislative Assembly of Alberta from 1971 to 1975 sitting with the governing Progressive Conservative caucus.

== Political career ==
Lee ran for a seat to the Alberta Legislature in the 1971 Alberta general election. He faced three other candidates in the new electoral district of Calgary-McKnight. Lee won the hotly contested race finishing ahead of Social Credit candidate Jim Richards to pick up the district for the Progressive Conservatives who formed government in that election.

Lee would retire from provincial politics at dissolution of the assembly in 1975.
