= Yolande Gagnon =

Canadian politician

Member of the Legislative Assembly of Alberta
- In office 1989–1993
- Preceded by: Eric Musgreave
- Succeeded by: District Abolished
- Constituency: Calgary-McKnight

Personal details
- Party: Alberta Liberal

Yolande Gagnon is a former provincial level politician from Alberta, Canada. She served as a member of the Legislative Assembly of Alberta from 1989 to 1993.

== Political career ==
Gagnon ran for a seat in the Alberta Legislature in the 1989 Alberta general election. She won the electoral district of Calgary-McKnight by a slim margin in a hotly contested three-way race over Progressive Conservative candidate Mark Petros.

Her electoral district was abolished due to redistribution. Gagnon ran for a second term in office in the new electoral district of Calgary Nose Creek for the 1993 Alberta general election. She was defeated by Progressive Conservative candidate Gary Mar in a closely contested race.
