= Neil Brown (Canadian politician) =

Canadian politician

MLA for Calgary-Nose Hill
- In office November 22, 2004 – May 5, 2015
- Preceded by: New district
- Succeeded by: Karen McPherson

Personal details
- Born: Roderick Neil Brown; 1947 or 1948 (age 78–79) Calgary, Alberta
- Party: Progressive Conservative
- Education: University of Calgary; University of Alaska; McGill University

Roderick Neil Brown, Q.C. is a lawyer, biologist, Canadian politician and former Member of the Legislative Assembly of Alberta, representing the constituency of Calgary-Nose Hill as a Progressive Conservative.

== Early life ==
Brown was born in Calgary, and earned a Bachelor of Science in biology from the University of Calgary in 1971. He subsequently earned a Master of Science in zoology from the University of Alaska in 1974 and a Ph.D. in biology from McGill University in 1977. He worked as an assistant professor of biology at Trent University before returning to the University of Calgary to earn his Bachelor of Laws, which he received in 1982. He worked for McLaws and Company (now Parlee McLaws LLP) in civil litigation before opening his own practice in 1987.

== Political career ==
Brown first sought election in the 2004 provincial election, when he ran as the Progressive Conservative candidate in the newly formed Calgary-Nose Hill. He defeated his closest challenger, Liberal Len Borowski, by more than 1,500 votes. During his first term, in addition to his responsibilities as an MLA, Brown served as chair of both the Private Bills Committee and the Conflicts of Interest Act Review Committee. He was also a member of the Cabinet Policy Committee on Resources and the Environment, the Standing Committee on Government Services, the MLA Committee on AISH Review, the MLA Committee on Métis Harvesting, the Agenda and Priorities Committee, the Public Accounts Committee, and the Legislative Review Committee. He also served as chair of the Alberta Forestry Research Institute.

Brown faced Borowski again in the 2008 election, and defeated him by a similar margin.

Currently, in addition to his duties as MLA for Calgary-Nose Hill, Brown serves as chair of the Private Bills Committee and is a member of the Standing Committee on Public Safety and Services. He also holds the position of chair of the Cabinet Policy Committee on Public Safety and Services with Responsibilities to the departments of Executive Council, Treasury Board, Justice, Aboriginal Relations, Solicitor General and Public Security, and Service Alberta.

=== Legislative initiatives ===
Although he has never been a cabinet minister, Brown has sponsored a large number of government bills, all of which have passed through the legislature. The Business Corporations Amendment Act was a 2005 bill that made a variety of changes to the management of corporations domiciled in Alberta, including prohibiting accountants who owned shares in a corporation from acting as its auditor. Liberals Mo Elsalhy, Harry B. Chase, and Dan Backs spoke in support of the bill, although New Democrat Raj Pannu expressed concern that a provision that created unlimited liability corporations would flood Alberta with de facto American corporations that were registered in Alberta but did their business elsewhere. This bill was followed by the Business Corporations Amendment Act (No. 2), which provided protection for minority shareholders in the event that a corporation was converted to unlimited liability over opposition, and which clarified the period during which former shareholders in unlimited liability corporations remained liable. It passed with Liberal support, although Pannu expressed concern that the new protections were not sufficient. Also in 2005, Brown sponsored the Employment Pension Plans Amendment Act, which implemented uncontroversial changes to the regulation of private pensions and which received support from all parties.

Brown sponsored two government bills in 2006. The Persons with Developmental Disabilities Community Governance Amendment Act dissolved the Persons with Developmental Disabilities Provincial Board and transferred its authority to the Minister of Seniors and Community Supports, while expanding the authority of the six regional boards. MLAs from all parties, including Liberals Bharat Agnihotri, Hugh MacDonald, and Bridget Pastoor, Alberta Alliance leader Paul Hinman, and New Democrats Ray Martin, Brian Mason, and Raj Pannu, supported the bill. The Health Information Amendment Act made a number of changes to the conditions under which health information would be disclosed, including preventing the automatic reporting of private information to American authorities under the PATRIOT Act. New Democrats Pannu and David Eggen and Liberals Elsalhy, Pastoor, and Bruce Miller spoke in favour of the bill, although Liberal Laurie Blakeman expressed reservations that the content of the bill didn't reflect the recommendations of the legislature's special committee whose work led to the bill.

In 2007, Brown sponsored one of the new Ed Stelmach government's flagship pieces of legislation, the Conflicts of Interest Amendment Act, which lengthened the cooling off period during which cabinet ministers and other high-ranking members of government to engage in certain activities after leaving the government's employment. It also placed a requirement on MLAs that they report any personal litigation in which they were engaged, and was supported by all parties. The same year he sponsored the Limitation Statutes Amendment Act, which was also supported by the opposition and which amended Alberta's statute of limitations for some civil matters. Finally, Brown sponsored the Appeal Procedures Statutes Amendment Act. This bill made some amendments to the procedures of the Alberta Court of Appeal. It was supported by Liberals Elsalhy and Maurice Tougas, but Pannu expressed some concern with a provision that would have made the keeping of transcripts of procedures discretionary.

== Personal life ==
Brown has made a number of notable contributions to the public sector; he served on the Board of Governors and Senate of The University of Calgary, was Past-president of the Alumni Association of The University of Calgary, and was member of Student Legal Aid at The University of Calgary. He also held the titles of Vice-president and chair of his Community Association, Associate (voting) member of the Royal Canadian Legion for over 25 years, Director of the Midnapore Church of England Society (historic site), and Lecturer at the Historic Calgary Week of Chinook Country Historical Society. Brown also volunteered with the Booster Club of Thorncliffe-Greenview Community Association and canvassed for the Canadian Cancer Society, the Kidney Foundation, the Heart and Stroke Foundation, and the Alberta Lung Association.

In recognition of his commendable work, he has received a number of prestigious awards and honours including: National Research Council of Canada Scholar, National Sciences and Engineering Research Council grant, Chief Justice McGillivray Shield (University of Calgary, Faculty of Law), President's Citation (University of Calgary Students’ Union), Award of Merit Honoree (Alumni Association of the University of Calgary), Canada 125 Medal for Service to Community and Canada, and the Alberta Centennial medal for outstanding service to Alberta.

Brown enjoys various activities such as curling, canoeing, hunting, and fishing, in addition to creative writing, reading, and traveling. He identifies John A. Macdonald and Winston Churchill as his political heroes.

2012 Alberta General Election results (Calgary-McKay-Nose Hill)	Turnout 48.9%		
Affiliation	Candidate	Votes	%
Progressive Conservative	Neil Brown	6,604	46.5%
Liberal	Don Thompson	1,105	7.8%
Wildrose Alliance	Roy M. Alexander	5,445	38.4%
Alberta Party	Jason Webster	207	1.5%
NDP	Anne Wilson	840	5.9%

== Election results ==
2004 Alberta general election: Calgary-Nose Hill
Party	Candidate	Votes	%	±%
Progressive Conservative	Neil Brown	4,372	47.01%	–
Liberal	Len Borowski	2,607	28.03%	–
Alberta Alliance	Bill McGregor	1,009	10.85%	–
Greens	John Johnson	583	6.27%	–
New Democratic	Dirk Huysman	549	5.90%	–
Social Credit	Raymond (Chick) Hurst	180	1.94%	–
Total		9,300	–	–
Rejected, spoiled and declined		46	–	–
Eligible electors / turnout		23,572	39.65%	–
Progressive Conservative pickup new district.				
Source(s) Source:"Calgary-Nose Hill Statement of Official Results 2004 Alberta general election" (PDF). Elections Alberta.

2008 Alberta general election: Calgary-Nose Hill
Party	Candidate	Votes	%	±%
Progressive Conservative	Neil Brown	4,586	49.24%	2.23%
Liberal	Len Borowski	2,761	29.65%	1.61%
Wildrose Alliance	John A. Murdoch	954	10.24%	-0.61%
Green	Nick Burman	624	6.70%	0.43%
New Democratic	Tristan Ridley	388	4.17%	-1.74%
Total		9,313	–	–
Rejected, spoiled and declined		27	–	–
Eligible electors / turnout		26,387	35.40%	-4.25%
Progressive Conservative hold		Swing		0.31%
Source(s) Source: The Report on the March 3, 2008 Provincial General Election of the Twenty-seventh Legislative Assembly (PDF). Elections Alberta. 28 July 2008. pp. 252–255.

2012 Alberta general election: Calgary-Mackay-Nose Hill
Party	Candidate	Votes	%	±%
Progressive Conservative	Neil Brown	6,604	46.47%	–
Wildrose	Roy M. Alexander	5,455	38.39%	–
Liberal	Don Thompson	1,105	7.78%	–
New Democratic	Anne Wilson	840	5.91%	–
Alberta Party	Jason Webster	207	1.46%	–
Total		14,211	–	–
Rejected, spoiled and declined		69	–	–
Eligible electors / turnout		29,193	48.92%	–
Progressive Conservative pickup new district.				
Source(s) Source: "19 - Calgary-Mackay-Nose Hill Official Results 2012 Alberta general election". officialresults.elections.ab.ca. Elections Alberta.

2015 Alberta general election: Calgary-Mackay-Nose Hill
Party	Candidate	Votes	%	±%
New Democratic	Karen McPherson	6,177	36.86%	30.94%
Wildrose	Kathy Macdonald	4,914	29.32%	-9.07%
Progressive Conservative	Neil Brown	4,585	27.36%	-19.11%
Liberal	Prab Lashar	768	4.58%	-3.19%
Green	Sandy Kevin Aberdeen	316	1.89%	–
Total		16,760	–	–
Rejected, spoiled and declined		91	–	–
Eligible electors / turnout		34,487	48.86%	-0.05%
New Democratic gain from Progressive Conservative		Swing		-0.27%
Source(s) Source: "19 - Calgary-Mackay-Nose Hill Official Results 2015 Alberta general election". officialresults.elections.ab.ca. Elections Alberta.
