= Calgary-Nose Creek =

Defunct provincial electoral district in Alberta, Canada

Coordinates: 51.13°N 114.11°W

Alberta electoral district

Defunct provincial electoral district
- Legislature: Legislative Assembly of Alberta
- District created: 1993
- District abolished: 2004
- First contested: 1993
- Last contested: 2001

Calgary-Nose Creek was a provincial electoral district in Calgary, Alberta, Canada, mandated to return a single member to the Legislative Assembly of Alberta using the first past the post method of voting from 1993 to 2004.

== History ==
The Calgary-Nose Creek electoral district was created during the 1993 electoral boundary re-distribution from the Calgary-McKnight electoral district.

The Calgary-Nose Creek electoral district would be dissolved in the 2003 Alberta boundary re-distribution and would be re-distributed into the Calgary-Mackay and Calgary-Nose Hill electoral districts.

The riding was named for the Nose Creek that winds its way through the northern part of Calgary.

=== Members of the Legislative Assembly (MLAs) ===
Members of the Legislative Assembly for Calgary-Nose Creek
| Assembly | Years | Member | Party |
|---|---|---|---|
See Calgary-McKnight electoral district from 1971-1993
| 20th | 1993–1997 | Gary Mar | Progressive Conservative |
| 22nd | 1997–2001 | Gary Mar | Progressive Conservative |
| 23rd | 2001–2004 | Gary Mar | Progressive Conservative |
See Calgary-Mackay electoral district from 2004-2012 and Calgary-Nose Hill electoral district from 2004-2012

== Election results ==
=== 1993 ===
1993 Alberta general election
| Party | Candidate | Votes | % | ±% |
|---|---|---|---|---|
| Progressive Conservative | Gary Mar | 6,974 | 53.66% | – |
| Liberal | Yolande Gagnon | 5,057 | 38.91% | – |
| New Democratic | Albert Sole | 789 | 6.07% | – |
| Natural Law | Ray Harris | 176 | 1.35% | – |
| Total | | 12,996 | – | – |
| Rejected, spoiled and declined | | 33 | – | – |
| Eligible electors / turnout | | 22,672 | 57.47% | – |
| Progressive Conservative pickup new district. | | | | |
Source(s) Source: "Calgary-Nose Creek Official Results 1993 Alberta general election". Alberta Heritage Community Foundation.

=== 1997 ===
1997 Alberta general election
| Party | Candidate | Votes | % | ±% |
|---|---|---|---|---|
| Progressive Conservative | Gary Mar | 7,815 | 64.48% | 10.82% |
| Liberal | Peter Willott | 2,894 | 23.88% | -15.03% |
| Social Credit | Greg Greene | 715 | 5.90% | – |
| New Democratic | Doral Johnson | 696 | 5.74% | -0.33% |
| Total | | 12,120 | – | – |
| Rejected, spoiled and declined | | 28 | – | – |
| Eligible electors / turnout | | 26,461 | 45.91% | -11.56% |
| Progressive Conservative hold | | Swing | | 12.93% |
Source(s) Source: "Calgary-Nose Creek Official Results 1997 Alberta general election". Alberta Heritage Community Foundation.

=== 2001 ===
2001 Alberta general election
| Party | Candidate | Votes | % | ±% |
|---|---|---|---|---|
| Progressive Conservative | Gary Mar | 11,997 | 74.81% | 10.33% |
| Liberal | Peter Willott | 3,263 | 20.35% | -3.53% |
| New Democratic | Eileen Nesbitt | 776 | 4.84% | -0.90% |
| Total | | 16,036 | – | – |
| Rejected, spoiled, and declined | | 51 | – | – |
| Eligible electors / turnout | | 33,778 | 47.63% | 1.72% |
| Progressive Conservative hold | | Swing | | 6.93% |
Source(s) Source: "Calgary-Nose Creek Official Results 2001 Alberta general election". Alberta Heritage Community Foundation.

== See also ==
- List of Alberta provincial electoral districts
- Canadian provincial electoral districts
