= Calgary-Northern Hills =

Provincial electoral district in Alberta, Canada

Alberta electoral district
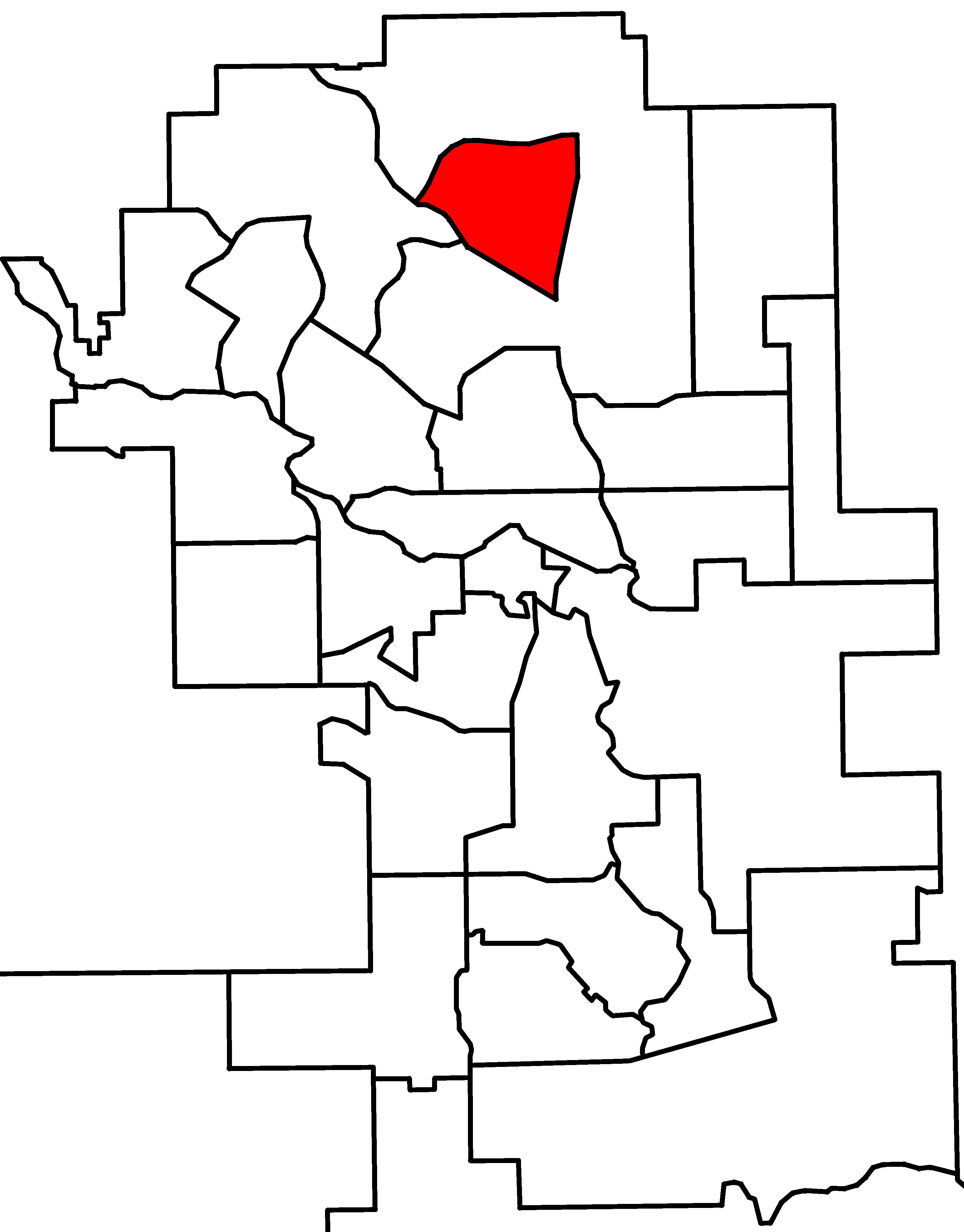
- 2010 boundaries

Defunct provincial electoral district
- Legislature: Legislative Assembly of Alberta
- District created: 2010
- District abolished: 2019
- First contested: 2012
- Last contested: 2015

Calgary-Northern Hills was a provincial electoral district in Calgary, Alberta, Canada. The district was created in the 2010 boundary redistribution and is mandated to return a single member to the Legislative Assembly of Alberta using the first past the post voting system. It was dissolved in the 2017 boundary redistribution.

== History ==
The electoral district was created in the 2010 Alberta boundary re-distribution. It was created from Calgary-Mackay which was split to make this district while the rest was merged with Calgary-Nose Hill to make Calgary-Mackay-Nose Hill. The district was dissolved into Calgary-North and Calgary-North East by the 2017 Electoral Boundaries Commission.

=== Boundary history ===
23 Calgary-Northern Hills 2010 boundaries
Bordering districts
North	East	West	South
Calgary-Mackay-Nose Hill	Calgary-Mackay-Nose Hill	Calgary-Foothills	Calgary-Mackay-Nose Hill
Legal description from the Statutes of Alberta 2010, Electoral Divisions Act.

=== Electoral history ===
Calgary-Northern Hills
Assembly	Years	Member	Party
Riding created from Calgary-Mackay
28th	2012–2015	Teresa Woo-Paw	Progressive Conservative
29th	2015–2019	Jamie Kleinsteuber	New Democratic
Riding dissolved into Calgary-North and Calgary-North East

The predecessor district Calgary-Mackay returned Progressive Conservative candidates. The current incumbent is Jamie Kleinsteuber who was first elected in 2015 in the riding of Calgary-MacKay.

== Legislative election results ==
=== 2012 ===
2012 Alberta general election
Party	Candidate	Votes	%
Progressive Conservative	Teresa Woo-Paw	6,144	49.02%
Wildrose	Prasad Panda	4,637	37.00%
Liberal	Kirstin Morrell	1,058	8.44%
New Democratic	Stephanie Westlund	694	5.54%

=== 2015 ===
2015 Alberta general election
Party	Candidate	Votes	%
New Democratic	Jamie Kleinsteuber	6,641	38.2
Progressive Conservative	Teresa Woo-Paw	5,343	30.7
Wildrose	Prasad Panda	4,392	25.3
Liberal	Harry Lin	1,000	5.8
Total valid votes		17,376	100.0
Rejected, spoiled and declined		160	
Turnout		17,536	46.1
Eligible voters		38,004	
Source: Elections Alberta

== Student vote results ==
=== 2012 ===
2012 Alberta student vote results
Affiliation	Candidate	Votes	%
Progressive Conservative	Teresa Woo-Paw		%
Wildrose	Prasad Panda		
Liberal	Kirstin Morrell		%
NDP	Stephanie Westlund		%
Social Credit			%
Total			100%

== See also ==
- List of Alberta provincial electoral districts
- Canadian provincial electoral districts
