= Calgary-Nose Hill (provincial electoral district) =

Defunct provincial electoral district in Alberta, Canada

Coordinates: 51.102°N 114.085°W

Alberta electoral district
- 2004 boundaries

Defunct provincial electoral district
- Legislature: Legislative Assembly of Alberta
- District created: 2004
- District abolished: 2012
- First contested: 2004
- Last contested: 2008

Calgary-Nose Hill was a provincial electoral district in Calgary, Alberta, Canada, mandated to return a single member to the Legislative Assembly of Alberta using the first past the post method of voting from 2004 to 2012.

== Calgary-Nose Hill history ==
The Calgary-Nose Hill electoral district was created in the 2003 electoral boundary re-distribution from portions of Calgary-Foothills, Calgary-North Hill and Calgary-Nose Creek electoral districts. The riding was named after Nose Hill Park in Calgary.

The Calgary-Nose Hill electoral district would be dissolved in the 2010 Alberta boundary re-distribution and would be re-distributed into the Calgary-Mackay-Nose Hill electoral district.

=== Boundary history ===
21 Calgary-Nose Hill 2003 boundaries
Bordering districts
North	East	West	South
Calgary-Mackay	Calgary-McCall	Calgary-Foothills	Calgary-North Hill, Calgary-Varsity
riding map goes here		map in relation to other districts in Alberta goes here	
Legal description from the Statutes of Alberta 2003, Electoral Divisions Act
Starting at the intersection of Shaganappi Trail NW with the westerly extension of Utility Right of Way (UR/W) 9011734 (lying along the north boundary of Nose Hill Park); then 1. southeast along UR/W 9011734 to MacEwan Park View NW; 2. east along MacEwan Park View NW to MacEwan Glen Drive NW; 3. east along MacEwan Glen Drive NW and Berkshire Boulevard NW to Beddington Trail NW; 4. southeast along Beddington Trail NW and Beddington Trail NE to Deerfoot Trail NE; 5. south along Deerfoot Trail NE to McKnight Boulevard NE; 6. west along McKnight Boulevard NE, McKnight Boulevard NW and 48 Avenue NW to North Haven Drive NW; 7. north and northwest along North Haven Drive to 14 Street NW; 8. south along 14 Street NW to John Laurie Boulevard NW; 9. northwest along John Laurie Boulevard NW to Shaganappi Trail NW; 10. north along Shaganappi Trail NW to the starting point.
Note:

Members of the Legislative Assembly for Calgary-Nose Hill
Assembly	Years	Member	Party
See Calgary-Foothills, 1971–2004, Calgary-North Hill 1971-2004 and Calgary-Nose Creek 1993-2004
26th	2004–2008	Neil Brown	Progressive Conservative
27th	2008–2012	Neil Brown	Progressive Conservative
See Calgary-Mackay-Nose Hill electoral district from 2012-2019

=== Electoral history ===
The electoral district was created from parts of three different riding's in the 2004 boundary redistribution. The first election held in 2004 saw Progressive Conservative candidate Neil Brown pick up the district with under half (47%) of the popular vote. He defeated a field of four other candidates.

Brown stood for re-election against four other candidates in the 2008 general election. He was returned to power with a slight increase in his popular vote but still won under 50%.

== Legislative election results ==
=== 2004 ===
2004 Alberta general election
Party	Candidate	Votes	%	±%
Progressive Conservative	Neil Brown	4,372	47.01%	–
Liberal	Len Borowski	2,607	28.03%	–
Alberta Alliance	Bill McGregor	1,009	10.85%	–
Greens	John Johnson	583	6.27%	–
New Democratic	Dirk Huysman	549	5.90%	–
Social Credit	Raymond (Chick) Hurst	180	1.94%	–
Total		9,300	–	–
Rejected, spoiled and declined		46	–	–
Eligible electors / turnout		23,572	39.65%	–
Progressive Conservative pickup new district.				
Source(s) Source:"Calgary-Nose Hill Statement of Official Results 2004 Alberta general election" (PDF). Elections Alberta.

=== 2008 ===
2008 Alberta general election
Party	Candidate	Votes	%	±%
Progressive Conservative	Neil Brown	4,586	49.24%	2.23%
Liberal	Len Borowski	2,761	29.65%	1.61%
Wildrose Alliance	John A. Murdoch	954	10.24%	-0.61%
Green	Nick Burman	624	6.70%	0.43%
New Democratic	Tristan Ridley	388	4.17%	-1.74%
Total		9,313	–	–
Rejected, spoiled and declined		27	–	–
Eligible electors / turnout		26,387	35.40%	-4.25%
Progressive Conservative hold		Swing		0.31%
Source(s) Source: The Report on the March 3, 2008 Provincial General Election of the Twenty-seventh Legislative Assembly (PDF). Elections Alberta. July 28, 2008. pp. 252–255.

== Senate nominee election results ==
=== 2004 ===
2004 Senate nominee election results: Calgary-Nose Hill				Turnout 39.74%	
Affiliation	Candidate	Votes	% votes	% ballots	Rank
Progressive Conservative	Bert Brown	4,144	17.47%	51.88%	1
Progressive Conservative	Jim Silye	3,138	13.23%	39.29%	5
Progressive Conservative	Betty Unger	2,941	12.40%	36.82%	2
Independent	Link Byfield	2,390	10.08%	29.92%	4
Progressive Conservative	Cliff Breitkreuz	2,151	9.07%	26.93%	3
Progressive Conservative	David Usherwood	2,013	8.49%	25.20%	6
Alberta Alliance	Vance Gough	1,841	7.76%	23.05%	8
Independent	Tom Sindlinger	1,761	7.43%	22.05%	9
Alberta Alliance	Michael Roth	1,712	7.22%	21.44%	7
Alberta Alliance	Gary Horan	1,624	6.85%	20.33%	10
Total votes		23,715	100%		
Total ballots		7,987	2.97 votes per ballot		
Rejected, spoiled and declined		1,381			

Voters had the option of selecting four candidates on the ballot.

== 2004 student vote results ==
Participating schools
John G. Diefenbaker High School
Sir John A Macdonald Junior High School
St. Hubert School

On November 19, 2004, a student vote was conducted at participating Alberta schools to parallel the 2004 Alberta general election results. The vote was designed to educate students and simulate the electoral process for persons who had not yet reached the legal majority. The vote was conducted in 80 of the 83 provincial electoral districts, with students voting for actual election candidates. Schools with a large student body who resided in another electoral district had the option to vote for candidates outside of the electoral district than where they were physically located.

2004 Alberta student vote results
Affiliation	Candidate	Votes	%
Progressive Conservative	Neil Brown	133	27.65%
Liberal	Len Borowski	107	22.25%
NDP	Dick Huysman	92	19.13%
Green	John Johnson	66	13.72%
Alberta Alliance	Bill McGregor	60	12.47%
Social Credit	Raymond Hurst	23	4.78%
Total		481	100%
Rejected, spoiled and declined		4	

== See also ==
- List of Alberta provincial electoral districts
- Canadian provincial electoral districts
