= Hidden Valley, Calgary =

Hidden Valley
- Neighbourhood
- Location of Hidden Valley in Calgary
- Coordinates: 51°08′48″N 114°07′07″W
- Country: Canada
- Province: Alberta
- City: Calgary
- Quadrant: NW
- Ward: 3
- Established: 1990

Government
  - Mayor: Jeromy Farkas
  - Administrative body: Calgary City Council
  - Councillor: Andrew Yule (Independent)

Area
  - Total: 3.2 km^{2} (1.2 sq mi)
- Elevation: 1,135 m (3,724 ft)

Population (2006)
  - Total: 11,858
  - Average Income: $78,127
- Website: Hidden Valley Community Association

Hidden Valley is a residential neighbourhood in the northwest quadrant of Calgary, Alberta. It is located close to the northern edge of the city and is bordered by Stoney Trail to the north, Beddington Trail to the east, Country Hills Boulevard to the south, and Shaganappi Trail to the west. The neighbourhood contains one elementary school, two middle schools, and a small shopping centre. The Hidden Valley Community Association runs multiple annual events for Hidden Valley residents, including pumpkin carving contests and Easter egg hunts.

Hidden Valley was established in 1990. It is represented in the Calgary City Council by the Ward 3 councillor.

== History ==
Hidden Valley was the vicinity of a double homicide in July 2018.

The first house built in Hidden Valley was in 1991.

== Demographics ==
In the City of Calgary's 2012 municipal census, Hidden Valley had a population of 11,799 living in 3,867 dwellings, a 1.2% increase from its 2011 population of 11,657. With a land area of 4.3 km^{2} (1.7 sq mi), it had a population density of 2,740/km^{2} (7,110/sq mi) in 2012.

Residents in this community had a median household income of $78,127 in 2000, and there were 6.4% low-income residents living in the neighbourhood. As of 2000, 20.6% of the residents were immigrants. All buildings were single-family detached homes, and 2.1% of the housing was used for renting.

== Education ==
The community is served by public schools Hidden Valley Elementary (K-3), Valley Creek Middle (4-9), Crescent Heights High (10-12) and Catholic schools St. Elizabeth Seton (K-9), and Notre Dame High School (10-12), with the Hidden Valley, Valley Creek, and St. Elizabeth Seton being located directly within the neighbourhood itself.

== Politics ==
Hidden Valley covered by the Provincial Electoral District Calgary-Beddington represented in the Legislative Assembly of Alberta by Amanda Chapman of the Alberta New Democratic Party.

== See also ==
- List of neighbourhoods in Calgary
