= Eric Musgreave =

Canadian politician

Eric Charles Musgreave

Member of the Legislative Assembly of Alberta
- In office March 26, 1975 – March 19, 1989
- Preceded by: Calvin Lee
- Succeeded by: Yolande Gagnon
- Constituency: Calgary-McKnight

Alderman on Calgary City Council
- In office 1967–1974

Personal details
- Born: July 21, 1921 Condor, Alberta
- Died: June 16, 2000 (aged 78) Calgary, Alberta
- Party: Progressive Conservative
- Spouse: Betty Patricia Diane Smith
- Children: four
- Education: Carleton University (BComm)

Eric Charles Musgreave (July 21, 1921 – June 16, 2000) was a politician from Alberta, Canada. He served as a member of the Legislative Assembly of Alberta from 1975 to 1989 sitting with the governing Progressive Conservative caucus and as an Alderman on Calgary City Council from 1967 to 1974.

== Early life ==
Musgreave was born on July 21, 1921, in Condor, Alberta to Frank and Louisa Musgreave. He was educated at Western Canada High School in Calgary, Alberta. Musgreave enlisted with the Royal Canadian Air Force during the Second World War.

Musgreave attended Carleton University following the War, earning a Bachelor in Commerce and began working at Imperial Oil in Calgary.

== Political career ==
Musgreave was elected as Alderman on Calgary City Council for Ward 1 in the 1969 Calgary municipal election. He served three more terms before entering provincial politics.

Musgreave ran for a seat to the Alberta Legislature for the first time in the 1967 Alberta general election. He was defeated by Social Credit incumbent Lee Leavitt. He made another attempt to win a seat in the 1975 Alberta general election, this time in the electoral district of Calgary-McKnight. This time, Musgreave was successful as he defeated future MLA Ray Martin and two other candidates with a landslide victory.

Musgreave was returned for a second term in the 1979 Alberta general election. His popular support dropped slightly but he still won the electoral district convincingly. His largest victory came in the 1982 Alberta general election when he was returned for a third term. He defeated four other candidates and won the district with 10,000 votes over his second place competitor Eileen Nesbitt of the New Democrats.

The 1986 general election saw Musgreave's popularity plummet and his popular vote drop by almost two thirds. He still won the three-way race by doubling second place Sandra Botting from the New Democrats vote. Musgreave retired from provincial politics at the dissolution of the assembly in 1989. He died of a stroke in 2000.
