= Prasad Panda =

Canadian politician

The Honourable Prasad Panda ECA
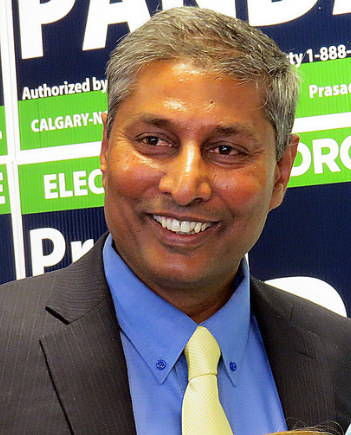
- Panda in 2015

Minister of Transportation
- In office June 21, 2022 – October 24, 2022
- Premier: Jason Kenney
- Preceded by: Rajan Sawhney
- Succeeded by: Devin Dreeshen

Minister of Infrastructure
- In office April 30, 2019 – June 21, 2022
- Premier: Jason Kenney
- Preceded by: Sandra Jansen
- Succeeded by: Nicholas Milliken

Member of the Legislative Assembly of Alberta for Calgary-Edgemont (Calgary-Foothills; 2015–2019)
- In office September 3, 2015 – May 29, 2023
- Preceded by: Jim Prentice
- Succeeded by: Julia Hayter

Personal details
- Born: 1962 or 1963 (age 62–63) Sangam Jagarlamudi, Andhra Pradesh, India
- Party: United Conservative
- Other political affiliations: Wildrose (until 2017)
- Occupation: Professional engineer

Prasad Panda ECA is a Canadian politician who was elected to the Legislative Assembly of Alberta in a 2015 by-election, replacing former Alberta Premier Jim Prentice, and the 2019 Alberta general elections to represent the electoral district of Calgary-Foothills.

He is a member of the United Conservative Party. With his party forming majority government Panda joined the Executive Council of Alberta as the Minister of Infrastructure beginning on April 30, 2019.

== Background ==
Prasad Panda was born in Sangam Jagarlamudi, Andhra Pradesh, India. Since coming to Canada, Panda has spent his entire life living in his constituency of Calgary-Edgemont. Panda holds a bachelor's degree in Mechanical Engineering and is a professional engineer by trade. He worked in the energy sector for 28 years, during which time he held senior management positions with Reliance Industries Ltd. and Suncor Energy Inc. Panda was a key member of the project management teams that built world-scale projects worth over $100 billion, including petroleum, petrochemical, power, pipelines, marine infrastructure, and oil sands projects. He is a member of Association of Professional Engineers and Geoscientists of Alberta (APEGA).

Panda is the president of the Telugu Association of Calgary and as the first vice-president of the India-Canada Association of Calgary. Panda also organizes an annual food drive for Calgary Veterans.

== Political career ==
Panda was a member of the Wildrose Party and defeated former Calgary city councillor and Alberta NDP MLA Bob Hawkesworth by 1598 votes, winning 38.3% of all votes cast.

In 2017, Panda joined the United Conservative Party and became the party's energy critic. Panda introduced Motion 505, a resolution calling on the federal government to ban the import of oil from countries with a poor human rights or environmental record, and to facilitate pipelines within Canada to ensure better prices for Alberta oil.

Panda ran in the 2019 Alberta general election and was elected to represent the electoral district of Calgary-Edgemont. He is a member of the United Conservative Party. With his party forming a majority government, Panda joined the Executive Council of Alberta as the Minister of Infrastructure, beginning on April 30, 2019.

In October 2021, Panda sponsored and introduced Bill 73, the Infrastructure Accountability Act. The bill aims to increase transparency and accountability by setting a guiding framework for long-term, priority-based public infrastructure planning. It also legislates a governance framework to guide how capital projects are prioritized, as well as the development of a 20-Year Strategic Capital Plan, which will help guide the government's infrastructure decisions over the long-term. The bill passed on the 7th of December 2021, and it is the only bill sponsored by Panda while he was in the cabinet.

Panda ran for re-election in the 2023 Alberta general election to represent the electoral district of Calgary-Edgemont. He lost his seat to Julia Hayter from the NDP, who received 34.03% of the vote in the 2019 Alberta general elections in the same riding.

== Electoral history ==
2023 Alberta general election: Calgary-Edgemont
| Party | Candidate | Votes | % | ±% |
|---|---|---|---|---|
| New Democratic | Julia Hayter | 11,681 | 49.30 | +15.27 |
| United Conservative | Prasad Panda | 11,397 | 48.10 | -4.75 |
| Alberta Party | Allen Schultz | 488 | 2.06 | -8.82 |
| Wildrose Loyalty Coalition | Nan Barron | 66 | 0.28 | – |
| Solidarity Movement | Miles Williams | 64 | 0.27 | – |
| Total | | 23,696 | 99.23 | – |
| Rejected and declined | | 184 | 0.77 | |
| Turnout | | 23,880 | 65.75 | |
| Eligible voters | | 36,322 | | |
| New Democratic gain from United Conservative | | Swing | | +10.01 |
Source(s) Source: Elections Alberta

2019 Alberta general election: Calgary-Edgemont
| Party | Candidate | Votes | % | ±% | Expenditures |
|---|---|---|---|---|---|
| United Conservative | Prasad Panda | 13,308 | 52.84 | -3.19 | $60,021 |
| New Democratic | Julia Hayter | 8,570 | 34.03 | +0.53 | $40,725 |
| Alberta Party | Joanne Gui | 2,740 | 10.88 | +9.12 | $39,339 |
| Liberal | Graeme Maitland | 305 | 1.21 | -5.15 | $500 |
| Green | Carl Svoboda | 155 | 0.62 | -1.57 | $500 |
| Alberta Independence | Tomasz Kochanowicz | 106 | 0.42 | – | $852 |
| Total | | 25,184 | 98.83 | – | |
| Rejected, spoiled and declined | | 299 | 1.17 | | |
| Turnout | | 25,483 | 70.11 | | |
| Eligible voters | | 36,346 | | | |
| United Conservative notional hold | | Swing | | -1.86 | |
Source(s) Source: Elections Alberta Note: Expenses is the sum of "Election Expenses", "Other Expenses" and "Transfers Issued". The Elections Act limits "Election Expenses" to $50,000.

=== Calgary-Foothills ===
Alberta provincial by-election, September 3, 2015: Calgary-Foothills Voiding of general election results due to Jim Prentice disclaiming his seat
| Party | Candidate | Votes | % | ±% |
|---|---|---|---|---|
| Wildrose | Prasad Panda | 4,877 | 38.35 | +20.24 |
| New Democratic | Bob Hawkesworth | 3,270 | 25.71 | -6.65 |
| Progressive Conservative | Blair Houston | 2,746 | 21.59 | -18.74 |
| Liberal | Ali Bin Zahid | 791 | 6.22 | -0.94 |
| Alberta Party | Mark Taylor | 610 | 4.80 | +4.80 |
| Green | Janet Keeping | 377 | 2.96 | +0.92 |
| Independent | Antoni Grochowski | 46 | 0.36 | – |
| Total valid votes | | 12,717 | | |
| Total rejected, unmarked and declined ballots | | | | |
| Turnout | | | 39.48 | |
| Eligible voters | | 32,212 | | |
| Wildrose gain from Progressive Conservative | | Swing | | +19.49 |

=== Calgary-Northern Hills ===
2015 Alberta general election: Calgary-Northern Hills
| Party | Candidate | Votes | % |
|---|---|---|---|
| New Democratic | Jamie Kleinsteuber | 6,641 | 38.2 |
| Progressive Conservative | Teresa Woo-Paw | 5,343 | 30.7 |
| Wildrose | Prasad Panda | 4,392 | 25.3 |
| Liberal | Harry Lin | 1,000 | 5.8 |
| Total valid votes | | 17,376 | 100.0 |
| Rejected, spoiled and declined | | 160 | |
| Turnout | | 17,536 | 46.1 |
| Eligible voters | | 38,004 | |
Source: Elections Alberta

2012 Alberta general election: Calgary-Northern Hills
| Party | Candidate | Votes | % |
|---|---|---|---|
| Progressive Conservative | Teresa Woo-Paw | 6,144 | 49.02% |
| Wildrose | Prasad Panda | 4,637 | 37.00% |
| Liberal | Kirstin Morrell | 1,058 | 8.44% |
| New Democratic | Stephanie Westlund | 694 | 5.54% |

Alberta provincial government of Jason Kenney
Cabinet post (1)
| Predecessor | Office | Successor |
|---|---|---|
| Sandra Jansen | Minister of Infrastructure; April 30, 2019– | Incumbent |
