= Calgary-Mackay =

Defunct provincial electoral district in Alberta, Canada

Coordinates: 51.13°N 114.10°W

Alberta electoral district
- 2004 boundaries

Defunct provincial electoral district
- Legislature: Legislative Assembly of Alberta
- District created: 2004
- District abolished: 2012
- First contested: 2004
- Last contested: 2008

Calgary-Mackay was a provincial electoral district in Calgary, Alberta, Canada, mandated to return a single member to the Legislative Assembly of Alberta using the first past the post method of voting from 2004 to 2012.

== History ==
The Calgary-MacKay electoral district was created in the 2003 electoral boundary re-distribution from the Calgary-Nose Creek electoral district.

The Calgary-MacKay electoral district would be dissolved in the 2010 Alberta boundary re-distribution and would be re-distributed into the Calgary-Northern Hills and Calgary-Mackay-Nose Hill electoral districts.

=== Boundary history ===
15 Calgary-Mackay 2003 boundaries
Bordering districts
North	East	West	South
Foothills-Rocky View	Calgary-McCall, Airdrie-Chestermere	Calgary-Foothills	Calgary-Nose Hill
riding map goes here		map in relation to other districts in Alberta goes here	
Legal description from the Statutes of Alberta 2003, Electoral Divisions Act.
Starting at the intersection of the north Calgary city boundary with Simons Valley Road NW; then 1. east along the city boundary to Deerfoot Trail NE; 2. generally south and southwest along Deerfoot Trail NE to Beddington Trail NE; 3. generally northwest along Beddington Trail NE and Beddington Trail NW to Berkshire Boulevard NW; 4. southwest along Berkshire Boulevard NW to MacEwan Glen Drive NW; 5. in a generally westerly direction along MacEwan Glen Drive NW to MacEwan Park View NW; 6. west along MacEwan Park View NW and its westerly extension to Utility Right of Way (UR/W) 9011734 (lying along the north boundary of Nose Hill Park); 7. west along the UR/W 9011734 and its westerly extension to Shaganappi Trail NW; 8. north along Shaganappi Trail NW to Country Hills Boulevard NW; 9. east along Country Hills Boulevard NW to Beddington Trail NW; 10. northwest along Beddington Trail NW and Simons Valley Road NW to the starting point.

=== Members of the Legislative Assembly (MLAs) ===
Members of the Legislative Assembly for Calgary-Mackay
Assembly	Years	Member	Party
See Calgary-Nose Creek electoral district from 1993-2004
26th	2004–2008	Gary Mar	Progressive Conservative
27th	2008–2012	Teresa Woo-Paw	Progressive Conservative
See Calgary-Northern Hills electoral district from 2012-present and Calgary-Mackay-Nose Hill electoral district from 2012-2019

== Legislative election results ==
=== 2004 ===
2004 Alberta general election
Party	Candidate	Votes	%	±%
Progressive Conservative	Gary Mar	5,575	56.17%	–
Liberal	Darryl G. Hawkins	2,617	26.37%	–
Alberta Alliance	Shawn Hubbard	626	6.31%	–
New Democratic	Giorgio Cattabeni	462	4.65%	–
Greens	David McTavish	445	4.48%	–
Independent	Paul Martin	200	2.02%	–
Total		9,925	–	–
Rejected, spoiled and declined		49	–	–
Eligible electors / turnout		27,866	35.79%	–
Progressive Conservative pickup new district.				
Source(s) Source: "Calgary-Mackay Official Results 2004 Alberta general election". Alberta Heritage Community Foundation.

=== 2008 ===
2008 Alberta general election
Party	Candidate	Votes	%	±%
Progressive Conservative	Teresa Woo-Paw	6,247	48.40%	-7.77%
Liberal	Tianna Melnyk	4,048	31.36%	4.99%
Wildrose	Rob Gregory	1,609	12.47%	6.15%
Green	Ryan Smith	578	4.48%	0.00%
New Democratic	Daena Diduck	426	3.30%	-1.35%
Total		12,908	–	–
Rejected, spoiled and declined		54	–	–
Eligible electors / turnout		37,883	34.22%	-1.58%
Progressive Conservative hold		Swing		-6.38%
Source(s) Source: "15 - Calgary-Mackay Official Results 2008 Alberta general election". officialresults.elections.ab.ca. Elections Alberta.

== Senate nominee election results ==
=== 2004 ===
2004 Senate nominee election results: Calgary-Mackay				Turnout 36.10%	
Affiliation	Candidate	Votes	% votes	% ballots	Rank
Progressive Conservative	Bert Brown	4,367	16.55%	50.71%	1
Progressive Conservative	Betty Unger	3,766	14.26%	43.74%	2
Progressive Conservative	Jim Silye	3,690	13.97%	42.85%	5
Progressive Conservative	David Usherwood	2,886	10.93%	33.51%	6
Progressive Conservative	Cliff Breitkreuz	2,644	10.01%	30.71%	3
Independent	Link Byfield	2,191	8.30%	25.44%	4
Alberta Alliance	Vance Gough	1,851	7.01%	21.50%	8
Alberta Alliance	Michael Roth	1,770	6.70%	20.56%	7
Alberta Alliance	Gary Horan	1,632	6.18%	18.95%	10
Independent	Tom Sindlinger	1,613	6.09%	18.73%	9
Total votes		26,410	100%		
Total ballots		8,611	3.07 votes per ballot		
Rejected, spoiled and declined		1,449			
27,886 eligible electors

Voters had the option of selecting four candidates on the ballot.

== 2004 student vote results ==
Participating schools
Brentwood Elementary
Monseignor N. Anderson School

On November 19, 2004, a student vote was conducted at participating Alberta schools to parallel the 2004 Alberta general election results. The vote was designed to educate students and simulate the electoral process for persons who have not yet reached the legal majority. The vote was conducted in 80 of the 83 provincial electoral districts with students voting for actual election candidates. Schools with a large student body that reside in another electoral district had the option to vote for candidates outside of the electoral district than where they were physically located.

2004 Alberta student vote results
Affiliation	Candidate	Votes	%
Progressive Conservative	Gary Mar	18	58.07%
Liberal	Darryl Hawkins	7	12.90%
Green	David McTavish	4	22.58%
Independent	Paul Martin	2	6.45%
NDP	Giorgio Cattabeni	0	0.00%
Alberta Alliance	Shawn Hubbard	0	0.00%
Total		31	
Rejected, spoiled and declined		0	

== See also ==
- List of Alberta provincial electoral districts
- Canadian provincial electoral districts
