= Teresa Woo-Paw =

Canadian politician

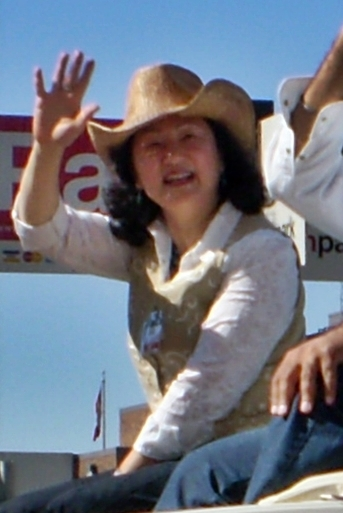

Member of the Legislative Assembly of Alberta for Calgary-Northern Hills
- In office March 3, 2008 – May 5, 2015
- Preceded by: Gary Mar
- Succeeded by: Jamie Kleinsteuber

Personal details
- Born: October 29, 1958 (age 67) Hong Kong
- Party: Alberta Party
- Other political affiliations: Progressive Conservative
- Spouse: Borick
- Children: 3
- Education: University of Calgary
- Occupation: Community Organizer
- Website: http://teresawoopaw.ca/

Teresa Yan-Yi Woo-Paw (simplified Chinese: 鲍胡嫈仪; traditional Chinese: 鮑胡嫈儀; pinyin: Bào-Hú Yīngyí; born October 29, 1958) is a Canadian politician and former Member of the Legislative Assembly of Alberta representing the constituency of Calgary-Northern Hills as a Progressive Conservative.

== Early life ==
Woo-Paw was born in Hong Kong. She graduated from the University of Calgary in 1982 with a Bachelor of Social Work degree and has been an active member of the Calgary-Mackay community for more than 30 years.

== Professional career ==
Prior to her election to the legislature, Woo-Paw was employed as a private consultant providing diversity training, program facilitation and instruction. Throughout her career, she has worked for the Calgary Health Region, Cultural Diversity Institute, United Way of Calgary, the Canadian Red Cross, Calgary Board of Education, the Calgary Immigrant Women's Association and the Calgary Immigrant Aid Society. She has also founded six organizations, and served with several others. Amongst them are:

- Calgary Chamber of Voluntary Organizations
- Calgary Chinese Cultural Centre
- Alberta Wild Rose Foundation
- Society for Cultural And Multicultural Programs
- Calgary Chinese Community Service Association (founding member)
- Southern Alberta Asian Heritage Foundation (founding member)
- Ethno-Cultural Council of Calgary (founding Co-Chair)

== Political career ==
Woo-Paw first sought public office in 1995 for the position of Public School Board Trustee for Wards 3 and 4 with the Calgary Board of Education (CBE), of which she was also the Chair. She ran for the position of Member of the Legislative Assembly of Alberta for the first time in the 2008 provincial election in the constituency of Calgary-Mackay. In that election, she received 48% of the vote. Woo-Paw served as deputy-chair of the Standing Committee on Private Bills as well as a member of the Cabinet Policy Committee on Public Safety and Services, the Standing Committee on Public Safety and Services, and the Standing Committee on Public Accounts.

In 2013, Woo-Paw was a member of the Executive Council of Alberta.

== Personal life ==
Woo-Paw is married to Borick Paw. The couple has three adult children: Jadine, Jason and Cordelia. Her active community involvement has earned her many prestigious awards including the Alberta Centennial Commemorative Award, the Queen's Jubilee Award for Multiculturalism and Community Services, the YWCA's Women of Distinction Award, the Immigrant of Distinction Award and Canada 125th Commemorative Award for Community Services.

== Election results ==
2008 Alberta general election: Calgary-Mackay
Party	Candidate	Votes	%	±%
Progressive Conservative	Teresa Woo-Paw	6,247	48.40%	-7.77%
Liberal	Tianna Melnyk	4,048	31.36%	4.99%
Wildrose	Rob Gregory	1,609	12.47%	6.15%
Green	Ryan Smith	578	4.48%	0.00%
New Democratic	Daena Diduck	426	3.30%	-1.35%
Total		12,908	–	–
Rejected, spoiled and declined		54	–	–
Eligible electors / turnout		37,883	34.22%	-1.58%
Progressive Conservative hold		Swing		-6.38%
Source(s) Source: "15 - Calgary-Mackay Official Results 2008 Alberta general election". officialresults.elections.ab.ca. Elections Alberta.

2012 Alberta general election: Calgary-Northern Hills
Party	Candidate	Votes	%
Progressive Conservative	Teresa Woo-Paw	6,144	49.02%
Wildrose	Prasad Panda	4,637	37.00%
Liberal	Kirstin Morrell	1,058	8.44%
New Democratic	Stephanie Westlund	694	5.54%

2015 Alberta general election: Calgary-Northern Hills
Party	Candidate	Votes	%
New Democratic	Jamie Kleinsteuber	6,641	38.2
Progressive Conservative	Teresa Woo-Paw	5,343	30.7
Wildrose	Prasad Panda	4,392	25.3
Liberal	Harry Lin	1,000	5.8
Total valid votes		17,376	100.0
Rejected, spoiled and declined		160	
Turnout		17,536	46.1
Eligible voters		38,004	
Source: Elections Alberta
