= Gary Mar =

Canadian politician (born 1962)

The Honourable Gary G. Mar ECA KC
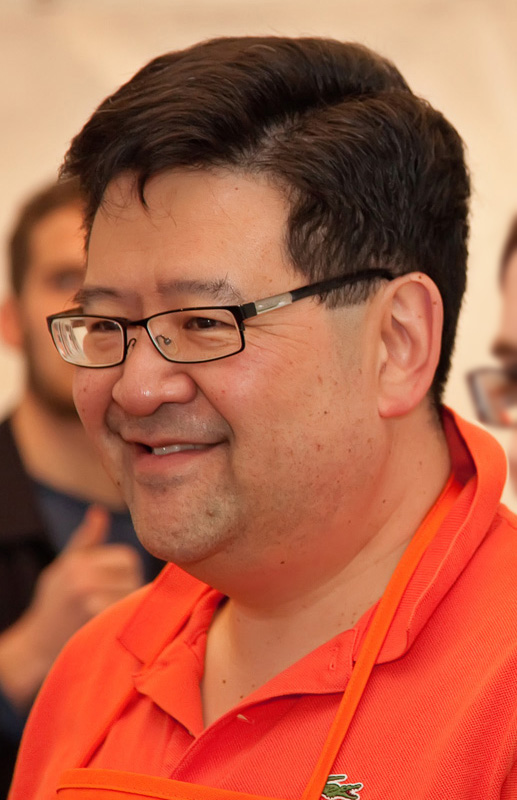

Alberta Trade Representative to Asia
- In office October 2011 – June 30, 2015

Minister-Counsellor of the Province of Alberta to the United States of America
- In office September 27, 2007 – March 16, 2011
Alberta Executive Council
Minister of Intergovernmental Relations
In office April 6, 2006 – December 14, 2006
Premier	Ralph Klein
Preceded by	Ed Stelmach
Succeeded by	Guy Boutilier
Minister of Health and Wellness
In office June 7, 2000 – November 24, 2004
Premier	Ralph Klein
Preceded by	Halvar Jonson
Succeeded by	Iris Evans
Minister of the Environment
In office May 26, 1999 – June 6, 2000
Premier	Ralph Klein
Preceded by	Ty Lund
Succeeded by	Halvar Jonson
Minister of Education
In office May 31, 1996 – May 26, 1999
Premier	Ralph Klein
Preceded by	Halvar Jonson
Succeeded by	Lyle Oberg
Minister of Community Development
In office November 25, 2004 – April 6, 2006
Premier	Ralph Klein
Preceded by	Gene Zwozdesky
Succeeded by	Denis Ducharme
In office June 30, 1993 – May 31, 1996
Premier	Ralph Klein
Preceded by	Dianne Mirosh
Succeeded by	Shirley McClellan
Parliamentary constituencies
Member of the Legislative Assembly of Alberta for Calgary Mackay (Calgary Nose Creek; 1993–2004)
In office June 15, 1993 – November 28, 2007
Preceded by	Riding established
Succeeded by	Teresa Woo-Paw

Personal details
- Born: Gary Glen Mar; July 26, 1962 (age 64) Calgary, Alberta
- Party: Progressive Conservative
- Spouse: Nancy
- Children: 3
- Education: University of Calgary, University of Alberta

Gary Glen Mar ECA KC, (simplified Chinese: 马健威; traditional Chinese: 馬健威; pinyin: Mǎ Jiànwēi; born July 26, 1962) is a Canadian businessman and former politician in Alberta. He is currently the president and CEO of the Canada West Foundation.

Mar served as a Member of the Legislative Assembly of Alberta from 1993 to 2007 and prior to his diplomatic postings held several Cabinet portfolios – Community Development; Health and Wellness; Education; Environment; and International and Intergovernmental Relations. On December 3, 2007, he was appointed the Official Representative for Alberta in Washington, D.C., and worked in the Canadian Embassy with the official title of Minister-Counsellor of the Province of Alberta to the United States. In March 2011, he resigned his post in order to seek the leadership of the Progressive Conservative Association of Alberta in its 2011 leadership election which he ultimately lost.

Gary Mar was appointed as the Province of Alberta's Representative in Asia on October 14, 2011. He led the province's strategic outreach efforts from his post in Hong Kong, from where he oversaw the province's five other Asia offices in Beijing, Shanghai, Tokyo, Seoul and Taiwan.

After more than 20 years as an Alberta politician and government official, Gary Mar's public sector career came to an end on June 30, 2015, when his contract as Alberta's representative in Asia expired, amid criticism of the former provincial Progressive Conservative administration's payout of $140,000 as part of a contract it signed with Mar in December 2011.

== Early life ==
Mar was born in Calgary, Alberta as the grandson of Chinese immigrants who came to what is now Alberta before it became a province. He was named after actor Gary Cooper and astronaut John Glenn. The son and grandson of entrepreneurs, Mar spent his early years working in his family's restaurants and other businesses. He graduated with a Bachelor of Commerce (Finance) at the University of Calgary (1984) and Bachelor of Laws at the University of Alberta (1987).

Before serving Albertans as an elected Member of the Alberta Legislature, Mar practiced general law in Calgary, Alberta. He was appointed Queen's Counsel in 1994, an honorary designation conferred by the Crown in Commonwealth countries and recognized by the courts. He was the youngest person in the Commonwealth to be appointed Queen's Counsel. From 1987 to 1990 Mar worked at the law firm MacKimmie Matthews, Barristers and Solicitors in Calgary and corporate, commercial, and real estate law at Code Hunter, Barristers and Solicitors from 1990 to 1992.

== Political career ==
At the age of 30, Mar was first elected the Alberta Legislature in the 1993 general election. He won the electoral district of Calgary Nose Creek defeating incumbent Liberal MLA Yolande Gagnon. He served for 14 years as an MLA, winning four consecutive elections in Calgary, Alberta and has held several Cabinet portfolios. Premier Ralph Klein had campaigned on a debt-reduction platform, and in his first years as a Cabinet Minister in Klein's government he developed and reinforced his fiscal management and commitment to balanced budgeting. During his 14 years as MLA, he has had well-rounded experience serving as Minister of Community Development; Health and Wellness; Education; Environment; and International and Intergovernmental Relations, which has covered responsibility for the arts, amateur sport, seniors, education, environment, provincial parks, health care, Alberta's centennial celebrations, Alberta's international offices and international relations, and Alberta's relations with other governments within Canada. He was a member of the Alberta Heritage Savings Trust Fund Committee, the Members’ Services Committee and the Cabinet Policy Committee on Managing Growth Pressures.

=== Cabinet Minister ===
As Minister of Environment, he served as co-chair of Climate Change Central, a public/private partnership formed in response to the international agreement on climate change. He led efforts to create a new provincial park in the Spray Valley to protect this unique and vulnerable area of Alberta's Rocky Mountains.

As Minister of Education, Mar introduced First Things First...Our Children, an initiative that focused on school children of all ages. It made a commitment to ensuring children can read well by grade 3, and focused on high standards for junior and senior high school students, keeping them in school and ensuring they have the skills they need when they graduate.

As Minister of Health and Wellness, he was instrumental in a number of changes to the system with long-lasting results, introducing a series of reforms to Alberta's health care system that focused on patients and delivered improved care at lower costs, including a province-wide electronic health record system, an innovative pilot project to reduce wait times for hip and knee surgeries, and the creation of 500 new training spaces for doctors, nurses and technicians. He ensured primary care networks, in which physicians lead a team of health care professionals. This interdisciplinary, community-accessible approach became the focus of the health system. He reduced the number of health regions; took steps with electronic health records, negotiated for different funding from the federal government of Canada, and worked with the physicians union to create a controversial model for their pay.

As Minister of International and Intergovernmental Relations, Mar led the Alberta at the Smithsonian project in 2006 which included Alberta as the first Canadian province ever featured at the Smithsonian Folklife Festival. Leading up to the Folklife Festival, Alberta Week in Washington included forums and meetings between Alberta leaders and U.S. decision makers and policy makers in Washington, D.C.

=== Official Representative for Alberta in Washington, D.C. ===
On September 27, 2007, Mar was named Alberta Envoy in Washington, D.C. Over four years, he led U.S. senators, congressmen and industry members to tour Alberta's oil sands, and promoted Alberta energy, agriculture and other products and opportunities in Washington and across the United States, speaking at conferences and symposiums, and representing Alberta at meetings and discussions. During his time in Washington, Mar was focused on raising awareness and knowledge among American political leaders about Alberta's economic strengths and its emergence as a world leader in the supply of reliable, clean, safe energy. He traveled and spoke to a number of state legislatures to inform them about the responsible development of the oil sands.

=== 2011 PC leadership election ===
On March 16, 2011, after resigning his post in Washington, Mar announced he was seeking the leadership of the Alberta Progressive Conservative Party. As a leadership candidate, he was the front-runner and caucus favourite. Although he received the most votes on the first and second ballots - achieving 40.76% of the votes on the first ballot and 42.51% of the votes on the second ballot - because he did not receive more than 50% of the vote, under the rules at the time voters' second preference votes were added and Alison Redford was declared the winner, with Mar losing the race.

== Alberta's Representative in Asia ==
Mar was named Alberta's trade envoy to Asia on October 14, 2011.

For the 2014 Winter Olympics, Mar, together with B.C.'s representative in Asia, Ben Stewart, asked the Canadian consulate in Hong Kong to allow CBC with a live-feed of men's gold medal hockey game, for the more than 300,000 Canadians in Hong Kong. "I miss home," said Mar, adding his mom lives in Calgary and his mother-in-law is in Edmonton. "That's the hardest part of the transition but in terms of being familiar with Hong Kong and the area here, I'm comfortable with that. Nancy is comfortable here."

== Controversies ==
As Minister of Health and Wellness, Mar hired his former executive assistant, Kelley Charlebois, through his consulting firm, to provide advice and support to him and the department. Over 3 years, the dollar value of the advice and travel added up to $389,000 No contract was required or awarded. During question period in the Legislative Assembly of Alberta, Dr. Kevin Taft, Leader of the Official Opposition, asked what reports were provided by Charlebois Consulting had produced for the government, Mar responded that "there are no reports as such."
