= Calgary-McKnight (provincial electoral district) =

Defunct provincial electoral district in Alberta, Canada

Coordinates: 51.09°N 114.08°W

Alberta electoral district

Defunct provincial electoral district
- Legislature: Legislative Assembly of Alberta
- District created: 1971
- District abolished: 1993
- First contested: 1971
- Last contested: 1989

Calgary-McKnight was a provincial electoral district in Alberta, Canada, mandated to return a single member to the Legislative Assembly of Alberta using the first past the post method of voting from 1971 to 1993.

== History ==
The Calgary-McKnight electoral district was created in the 1971 electoral boundary re-distribution from a merger of Calgary-North and Calgary Queens Park. In the 1993 electoral boundary re-distribution, Calgary-McKnight expanded and was renamed to Calgary Nose Creek. Calgary-McKnight was named because McKnight Boulevard the main east west artery in the north at the time, cut through the middle of the riding.

=== Members of the Legislative Assembly (MLAs) ===
Members of the Legislative Assembly for Calgary-McKnight
Assembly	Years	Member	Party
See Calgary-North electoral district from 1959-1971 and Calgary Queens Park electoral district from 1963-1971
17th	1971–1975	Calvin Lee	Progressive Conservative
18th	1975–1979	Eric C. Musgreave	Progressive Conservative
19th	1979–1982	Eric C. Musgreave	Progressive Conservative
20th	1982–1986	Eric C. Musgreave	Progressive Conservative
21st	1986–1989	Eric C. Musgreave	Progressive Conservative
22nd	1989–1993	Yolande Gagnon	Liberal
See Calgary Nose Creek electoral district from 1993-2004

== Legislative election results ==
=== 1971 ===
1971 Alberta general election: Calgary-McKnight
Party	Candidate	Votes	%	±%
Progressive Conservative	Calvin Lee	6,134	47.75%	–
Social Credit	Jim Richards	5,368	41.79%	–
New Democratic	Walter H. Siewert	1,097	8.54%	–
Liberal	Philip T. Keuber	246	1.92%	–
Total		12,845	–	–
Rejected, spoiled and declined		58	–	–
Eligible electors / turnout		17,756	72.67%	–
Progressive Conservative pickup new district.				
Source(s) Source: "Calgary-McKnight Official Results 1971 Alberta general election". Alberta Heritage Community Foundation.

=== 1975 ===
1975 Alberta general election: Calgary-McKnight
Party	Candidate	Votes	%	±%
Progressive Conservative	Eric C. Musgreave	8,586	67.88%	20.13%
New Democratic	Ray Martin	1,747	13.81%	5.27%
Social Credit	Allen Howard	1,572	12.43%	-29.36%
Liberal	Pat Smart	743	5.87%	3.96%
Total		12,648	–	–
Rejected, spoiled and declined		15	–	–
Eligible electors / turnout		21,556	58.74%	-13.92%
Progressive Conservative hold		Swing		24.05%
Source(s) Source: "Calgary-McKnight Official Results 1975 Alberta general election". Alberta Heritage Community Foundation.

=== 1979 ===
1979 Alberta general election: Calgary-McKnight
Party	Candidate	Votes	%	±%
Progressive Conservative	Eric C. Musgreave	7,248	61.99%	-5.90%
Social Credit	Jerry Melchin	2,684	22.95%	10.53%
New Democratic	Jack Dale	1,097	9.38%	-4.43%
Liberal	John J. Gleason	664	5.68%	-0.20%
Total		11,693	–	–
Rejected, spoiled and declined		N/A	–	–
Eligible electors / turnout		22,044	53.04%	-5.70%
Progressive Conservative hold		Swing		-7.52%
Source(s) Source: "Calgary-McKnight Official Results 1979 Alberta general election". Alberta Heritage Community Foundation.

=== 1982 ===
1982 Alberta general election: Calgary-McKnight
Party	Candidate	Votes	%	±%
Progressive Conservative	Eric C. Musgreave	12,130	71.70%	9.72%
New Democratic	Eileen Nesbitt	2,451	14.49%	5.11%
Western Canada Concept	John Jasienczyk	1,332	7.87%	–
Liberal	John J. Gleason	621	3.67%	-2.01%
Social Credit	Jerry J. Glowacki	383	2.26%	-20.69%
Total		16,917	–	–
Rejected, spoiled and declined		39	–	–
Eligible electors / turnout		29,771	56.95%	3.91%
Progressive Conservative hold		Swing		9.09%
Source(s) Source: "Calgary-McKnight Official Results 1982 Alberta general election". Alberta Heritage Community Foundation.

=== 1986 ===
1986 Alberta general election: Calgary-McKnight
Party	Candidate	Votes	%	±%
Progressive Conservative	Eric C. Musgreave	4,823	55.18%	-16.52%
New Democratic	Sandra Botting	2,610	29.86%	15.37%
Liberal	Carol Reimer	1,307	14.95%	11.28%
Total		8,740	–	–
Rejected, spoiled and declined		27	–	–
Eligible electors / turnout		25,480	34.41%	-22.55%
Progressive Conservative hold		Swing		-15.95%
Source(s) Source: "Calgary-McKnight Official Results 1986 Alberta general election". Alberta Heritage Community Foundation.

=== 1989 ===
1989 Alberta general election: Calgary-McKnight
Party	Candidate	Votes	%	±%
Liberal	Yolande Gagnon	5,303	42.84%	27.89%
Progressive Conservative	Mark Petros	4,704	38.00%	-17.18%
New Democratic	Roy Brown	2,371	19.15%	-10.71%
Total		12,378	–	–
Rejected, spoiled and declined		29	–	–
Eligible electors / turnout		26,617	46.61%	12.21%
Liberal gain from Progressive Conservative		Swing		-10.24%
Source(s) Source: "Calgary-McKnight Official Results 1989 Alberta general election". Alberta Heritage Community Foundation.

== See also ==
- List of Alberta provincial electoral districts
- Canadian provincial electoral districts
