= Calgary-Mackay-Nose Hill =

Defunct provincial electoral district in Alberta, Canada

Alberta electoral district
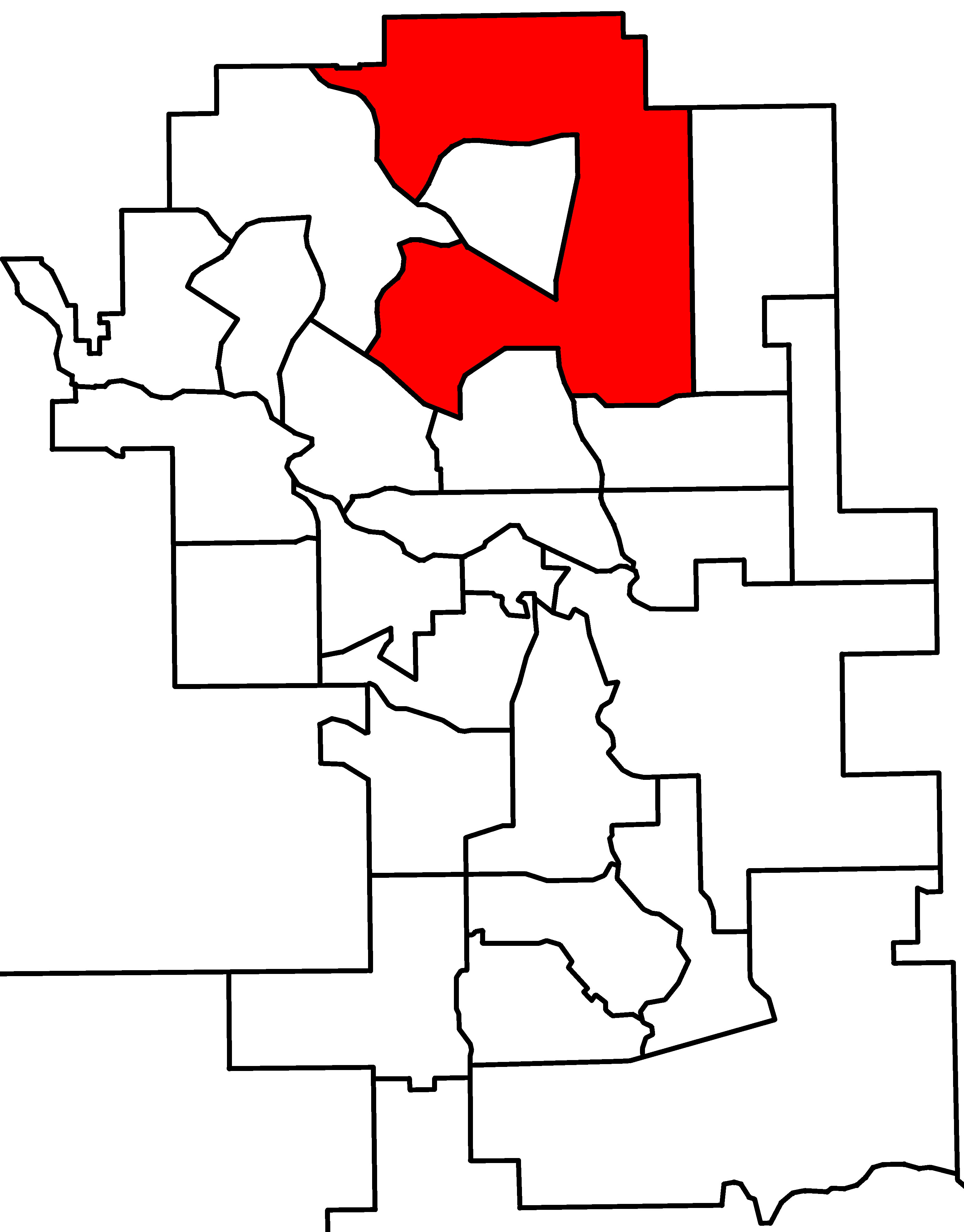
- 2010 boundaries

Defunct provincial electoral district
- Legislature: Legislative Assembly of Alberta
- District created: 2010
- District abolished: 2019
- First contested: 2012
- Last contested: 2015

Calgary-Mackay-Nose Hill was a provincial electoral district in Calgary, Alberta, Canada, mandated to return a single member to the Legislative Assembly of Alberta using the first past the post method of voting from 2012 to 2019.

== History ==
The electoral district was created in the 2010 Alberta boundary re-distribution. It was created when Calgary-Mackay and Calgary-Nose Hill were merged along with a large chunk of Calgary-McCall.

The Calgary-Mackay-Nose Hill electoral district was dissolved in the 2017 electoral boundary re-distribution into Calgary-Beddington and Calgary-North electoral districts ahead of the 2019 Alberta general election.

=== Boundary history ===
19 Calgary-Mackay-Nose Hill 2010 boundaries
Bordering districts
North	East	West	South
Chestermere-Rocky View	Calgary-McCall	Calgary-Foothills and Calgary-Northern Hills	Calgary-Cross, Calgary-Klein and Calgary-Varsity
Legal description from the Statutes of Alberta 2010, Electoral Divisions Act

=== Electoral history ===
Members of the Legislative Assembly for Calgary-Mackay-Nose Hill
Assembly	Years	Member	Party
See Calgary-Mackay 2004–2012 Calgary-McCall 1971–2012; Calgary-Nose Hill 2004–2012
28th	2012–2015	Neil Brown	Progressive Conservative
29th	2015–2017	Karen McPherson	New Democratic
29th	2017	Karen McPherson	Independent
29th	2017–2019	Karen McPherson	Alberta Party
See Calgary-Beddington and Calgary-North 2019–

The antecedent electoral districts that comprise Calgary-Mackay-Nose Hill generally returned Progressive Conservative candidates for many years. Progressive Conservative MLA Neil Brown was the first elected member for the electoral district in 2012. Neil Brown would be defeated by New Democratic MLA Karen McPherson in 2015. McPherson would leave the NDP caucus in 2017 and join the Alberta Party a week later.

== Legislative election results ==
=== 2012 ===
2012 Alberta general election
Party	Candidate	Votes	%	±%
Progressive Conservative	Neil Brown	6,604	46.47%	–
Wildrose	Roy M. Alexander	5,455	38.39%	–
Liberal	Don Thompson	1,105	7.78%	–
New Democratic	Anne Wilson	840	5.91%	–
Alberta Party	Jason Webster	207	1.46%	–
Total		14,211	–	–
Rejected, spoiled and declined		69	–	–
Eligible electors / turnout		29,193	48.92%	–
Progressive Conservative pickup new district.				
Source(s) Source: "19 - Calgary-Mackay-Nose Hill Official Results 2012 Alberta general election". officialresults.elections.ab.ca. Elections Alberta.

=== 2015 ===
2015 Alberta general election
Party	Candidate	Votes	%	±%
New Democratic	Karen McPherson	6,177	36.86%	30.94%
Wildrose	Kathy Macdonald	4,914	29.32%	-9.07%
Progressive Conservative	Neil Brown	4,585	27.36%	-19.11%
Liberal	Prab Lashar	768	4.58%	-3.19%
Green	Sandy Kevin Aberdeen	316	1.89%	–
Total		16,760	–	–
Rejected, spoiled and declined		91	–	–
Eligible electors / turnout		34,487	48.86%	-0.05%
New Democratic gain from Progressive Conservative		Swing		-0.27%
Source(s) Source: "19 - Calgary-Mackay-Nose Hill Official Results 2015 Alberta general election". officialresults.elections.ab.ca. Elections Alberta.

== Student vote results ==
=== 2012 ===
2012 Alberta student vote results
Affiliation	Candidate	Votes	%
Progressive Conservative	Neil Brown		%
Wildrose	Roy Alexander		
Liberal	Don Thompson		%
Alberta Party	Jason Webster		
NDP	Anne Wilson		%
Social Credit			%
Total			100%

== See also ==
- List of Alberta provincial electoral districts
- Canadian provincial electoral districts
