= Janet Koper =

Canadian politician (1931–1988)

Janet Shirley Koper

Member of the Legislative Assembly of Alberta
- In office 1982–1988
- Preceded by: Stewart McCrae
- Succeeded by: Pat Nelson
- Constituency: Calgary-Foothills

Personal details
- Born: July 22, 1931 Edmonton, Alberta
- Died: December 18, 1988 (aged 57)
- Party: Progressive Conservative
- Occupation: educator for 17 years, politician for 5 years

Janet Shirley Koper (July 22, 1931 – December 18, 1988) was a provincial level politician from Alberta, Canada. She served as a member of the Alberta Legislature from 1982 to 1988 sitting as a member of the governing Progressive Conservative caucus.

== Political career ==
Koper started her career as an educator, principal, and later a superintendent for the Calgary Public School Board. She ran for a seat to the Alberta Legislature for the first time in the 1982 Alberta general election. She won handily defeating four other candidates to hold the Calgary-Foothills electoral district for the governing Progressive Conservative caucus. During her term as MLA, Janet sponsored three crucial bills: The Public Health Act, The Child Transportation Safety Act, and the Maintenance Enforcement Act.

She was re-elected with a reduced majority to her second term in the 1986 Alberta general election. She died of cancer while still holding office in 1988.
