= Josephine Pon =

Canadian politician

The Honourable Josephine Pon ECA
- 盤世寶

Alberta Minister of Seniors and Housing
- In office April 30, 2019 – June 9, 2023
- Preceded by: Lori Sigurdson
- Succeeded by: Jason Nixon

Member of the Legislative Assembly of Alberta for Calgary-Beddington
- In office April 16, 2019 – May 29, 2023
- Preceded by: New district
- Succeeded by: Amanda Chapman

Personal details
- Born: British Hong Kong
- Party: United Conservative Party
- Education: University of Liverpool
- Occupation: Business Management

Josephine Pon ECA is a Canadian politician who was elected in the 2019 Alberta general election to represent the electoral district of Calgary-Beddington in the 30th Alberta Legislature. She is a member of the United Conservative Party. She was a member of the Standing Committee on the Alberta Heritage Savings Trust Fund and the Special Standing Committee on Members' Services. She previously was Alberta's Minister of Seniors and Housing from 2019 to 2022.

== Background ==
Pon was born in Hong Kong. She immigrated to Alberta, Canada in 1981, living her following years in Edmonton then eventually in Calgary with a career in banking before pursuing her political career. According to election promotion material from the 2019 Alberta provincial election, Pon worked in banking for over 20 years, in roles such as Account Manager in Personal/Commercial banking and Regional Manager, Business Development responsible for Multicultural Banking in the Prairie Region with Scotiabank working with more than 230 branches as well as 3,000 staff in and around the Prairie Region. Between 2013 and 2016 she was the chair of the board of directors for Immigrant Services Calgary (ISC) helping over 27,000 immigrants over 50 programs each year. She also worked at Canada Mortgage and Housing Corporation (CMHC), a crown corporation in mortgage insurance, as an International Trade Consultant as well as in the Assisted Housing department in the Prairie Region. Shortly before the election, she was Vice President of the Taste of Asia Group, which comprises five restaurants in Canada and well over 150 employees, claiming to assist in providing insight to the reality of the economic situation involving business and restaurant owners.

== Political career ==
On April 16, 2019, Pon was elected as the United Conservative Party MLA for Calgary-Beddington. She defeated Communications & Marketing Consultant, Alberta NDP candidate Amanda Chapman by 3807 votes, winning 53.1% of all votes cast.

Shortly after the election, Premier Jason Kenney appointed her as Alberta's Minister of Seniors and Housing, vowing to ensure that Albertans and seniors have access to affordable housing and have the resources they need. Since her appointment, she has worked on reforming conventional methods of application and management of provincial benefits such as mailing, faxing or dropping-off to a more senior friendly digital option. She has also made efforts to advance housing projects in Alberta, saying "Investing in affordable housing is vital to helping more low-income Albertans get on the path to financial stability."

Pon announced her affordable housing plan on Nov. 21, 2019, as a way to reduce red tape for Albertan applicants. On November 1, 2021, Pon announced the tabling of Bill 78: The Alberta Housing Amendment Act, which will allow the government to enter into "joint ventures" with for profit private companies in an effort to attract more investment to expand and improve affordable housing.

As part of a partnership with the federal Government of Canada, Pon announced a $444 million investment to fund rent support for nearly 35,500 households in Alberta.

The United Conservative Party of Alberta announced Josephine Pon would be their candidate for Calgary-Beddington in the 2023 Alberta general election. She lost her seat in the general election to the same Alberta NDP candidate, Amanda Chapman again.

She tried be the Conservative candidate in Calgary Skyview in the 2025 federal election but the party appointed someone else.

== Electoral record ==
2023 Alberta general election: Calgary-Beddington
Party	Candidate	Votes	%	±%
New Democratic	Amanda Chapman	10,269	49.66	+13.95
United Conservative	Josephine Pon	9,726	47.04	-6.07
Alberta Party	Wayne Jackson	473	2.29	-5.93
Liberal	Zarnab Shahid Zafar	210	1.02	-0.67
Total		20,678	99.32	–
Rejected and declined		142	0.68	
Turnout		20,820	58.28	
Eligible voters		35,724		
New Democratic gain from United Conservative		Swing		+10.01
Source(s) Source: Elections Alberta

2019 Alberta general election: Calgary-Beddington
Party	Candidate	Votes	%	±%	Expenditures
United Conservative	Josephine Pon	11,625	53.11	-3.74	$31,776
New Democratic	Amanda Chapman	7,818	35.71	-0.93	$15,589
Alberta Party	Carol-Lynn Darch	1,799	8.22	–	$2,014
Liberal	Chandan Tadavalkar	370	1.69	-2.91	$1,651
Alberta Independence	Tom Grbich	161	0.74	–	$500
Independent	Alexander Dea	117	0.53	–	$1,101
Total		21,890	99.53	–	
Rejected, spoiled and declined		103	0.47	–	
Turnout		21,993	63.12		
Eligible voters		34,845			
United Conservative notional hold		Swing		-1.41	
Source(s) Source: Elections Alberta Note: Expenses is the sum of "Election Expenses", "Other Expenses" and "Transfers Issued". The Elections Act limits "Election Expenses" to $50,000.

Alberta provincial government of Jason Kenney
Cabinet post (1)
Predecessor	Office	Successor
Lori Sigurdson	Minister of Seniors & Housing; April 30, 2019–October 11, 2022	Jeremy Nixon
