= Calgary-Foothills (electoral district) =

Provincial electoral district in Alberta, Canada

Coordinates: 51.16°N 114.16°W

Alberta electoral district
- Calgary-Foothills within the City of Calgary, 2017 boundaries

Provincial electoral district
- Legislature: Legislative Assembly of Alberta
MLA
Court Ellingson
New Democratic
- District created: 1971
- First contested: 1971
- Last contested: 2023

Demographics
- Population (2011): 43,015
- Census division(s): Division No. 6, Alberta
- Census subdivision(s): Calgary

Calgary-Foothills is a provincial electoral district for the Legislative Assembly of Alberta, Canada. It is located in the northwest corner of Calgary. It elected six consecutive Progressive Conservative MLAs from its creation in 1971 until ousted Premier Jim Prentice disclaimed his winning seat on the 2015 general election night, later electing a member of the Wildrose in the following by-election.

The riding contains the neighbourhoods of Edgemont, Hidden Valley, Hamptons and the Symons Valley neighbourhoods of Sage Hill, Nolan Hill, Sherwood and Kincora.

== History ==
The electoral district of Calgary-Foothills was created in the 1971 boundary redistribution from most of the area that comprised the old electoral district of Calgary Bowness.

The 2010 boundary redistribution saw only minor revisions made to the electoral district. The district's northern boundary was moved northward, adding a rural portion of Foothills-Rocky View riding, where the city of Calgary annexed new land. The district lost the neighbourhood of Citadel which was moved into the new riding of Calgary-Hawkwood.

From 1993 to 2004, the riding included the neighbourhoods of Hamptons, Hidden Valley, Edgermont, MacEwan, Dalhousie and Brentwood as well as Nose Hill Park.

=== Boundary history ===
10 Calgary-Foothills 2003 boundaries
Bordering districts
North	East	West	South
Foothills-Rocky View	Calgary-Mackay and Calgary-Nose Hill	Calgary-North West and Foothills-Rocky View	Calgary-Varsity
riding map goes here			
Legal description from the Statutes of Alberta 2003, Electoral Divisions Act.
Starting at the intersection of the north Calgary city boundary with the west Calgary city boundary; then 1. east along the north city boundary to Simons Valley Road NW; 2. south along Simons Valley Road NW and Beddington Trail NW to Country Hills Boulevard NW; 3. west along Country Hills Boulevard NW to Shaganappi Trail NW; 4. southwest along Shaganappi Trail NW to John Laurie Boulevard NW; 5. northwest along John Laurie Boulevard NW to Sarcee Trail NW; 6. north along Sarcee Trail NW to Country Hills Boulevard NW; 7. northwest along Country Hills Boulevard NW to 112 Avenue NW; 8. west along 112 Avenue NW to the west Calgary city boundary; 9. north along the west Calgary city boundary to the starting point.
Note:

11 Calgary-Foothills 2010 boundaries
Bordering districts
North	East	West	South
Chestermere-Rocky View	Calgary-Mackay-Nose Hill and Calgary-Northern Hills	Chestermere-Rocky View	Calgary-Hawkwood, Calgary-North West and Calgary-Varsity
Legal description from the Statutes of Alberta 2010, Electoral Divisions Act.

=== Representation history ===
Calgary-Foothills
Assembly	Years	Member	Party
Riding created from Calgary Bowness
17th	1971–1973	Len Werry	Progressive Conservative
17th	1973–1975	Stewart McCrae	Progressive Conservative
18th	1975–1979	Stewart McCrae	Progressive Conservative
19th	1979–1982	Stewart McCrae	Progressive Conservative
20th	1982–1986	Janet Koper	Progressive Conservative
21st	1986–1989	Janet Koper	Progressive Conservative
22nd	1989–1993	Pat Nelson	Progressive Conservative
23rd	1993–1997	Pat Nelson	Progressive Conservative
24th	1997–2001	Pat Nelson	Progressive Conservative
25th	2001–2004	Pat Nelson	Progressive Conservative
26th	2004–2008	Len Webber	Progressive Conservative
27th	2008–2012	Len Webber	Progressive Conservative
28th	2012–2014	Len Webber	Progressive Conservative
28th	2014–2014	Len Webber	Independent
28th	2014–2015	Jim Prentice	Progressive Conservative
29th	2015–2019	Prasad Panda	Wildrose
29th	2017–2019	Prasad Panda	United Conservative
30th	2019–2023	Jason Luan	United Conservative
31st	2023–Present	Court Ellingson	New Democratic

Calgary-Foothills was created in 1971 mostly from the predecessor district Calgary Bowness. That district had previously returned Social Credit MLA's from 1959 and 1963 and returned Progressive Conservative candidate Len Werry in the 1967 election. That district was abolished in 1971 and Werry ran as the incumbent in Foothills in the election held that year. He won the new district with over half the popular vote to take the new district for his party. Premier Peter Lougheed who had just formed government appointed Werry as Minister of Telephones and Utilities. On February 25, 1973, he died in a car accident resulting in a by-election several months later.

The 1973 by-election featured a number of Alberta political party leaders. The riding returned Progressive Conservative candidate Stewart McCrae who held the riding with 44% of the popular vote. He defeated Social Credit leader Werner Schmidt who finished a strong second. The results of the by-election proved devastating to the Social Credit party who suffered from internal problems after Schmidt was unable to win a seat.

McCrae ran for a second term in the 1975 general election. He was re-elected with a landslide majority and appointed to cabinet by Lougheed after the election as the Minister responsible for Calgary Affairs. He was re-elected for his third term in the 1979 general election and kept his seat in cabinet this time becoming Minister of Government Services. McCrae retired at dissolution of the assembly in 1982.

The third representative was Janet Koper who was returned as a Progressive Conservative candidate in the 1982 general election with a landslide majority. She was re-elected in the 1986 election with a reduced majority. On December 18, 1988, Koper died. The electoral district remained vacant until the March 1989 election.

Pat Black was fourth representative in the riding. She was returned in the 1989 election holding the district was just 37% of the popular vote. She was appointed to the provincial cabinet as Minister of Energy when Premier Ralph Klein took power in 1992. She was reelected with a solid majority in 1993 and kept her seat in cabinet.

Black won her third term in office in the 1997 election with over 60% of the popular vote. After the election she became the new Minister of Economic Development and Tourism. In 1998 she got married and changed her last name to Nelson. In 1999 she was shuffled to be the Minister of Government Services. Nelson won re-election to her fourth term in the 2001 election winning a very large majority. She became the Minister of Finance until she retired from public office dissolution of the assembly in 2004.

The 2004 election returned Progressive Conservative candidate Len Webber. He won his second and third terms in 2008 and 2012. In March 2014 Webber left the PC caucus to sit as an independent. Webber resigned from the legislature thus giving Premier Jim Prentice, the new leader of the Progressive Conservative Party, an opportunity to seek the seat in a by-election in 2014. In the 2015 provincial election, Prentice led the Progressive Conservative government to defeat but retained his seat. Nevertheless, he resigned both the party leadership and his seat in the legislature, upon the announcement of the election results.

The subsequent by-election elected Prasad Panda of the Wildrose Party, who was the first non-PC MLA returned from Calgary-Foothills. In second place was NDP candidate Bob Hawkesworth, with PC candidate Blair Houston finishing third overall.

== Legislative election results ==
=== 1971 ===
1971 Alberta general election
Party	Candidate	Votes	%	±%
Progressive Conservative	Len F. Werry	7,693	51.47%	–
Social Credit	Jay Salmon	5,885	39.37%	–
New Democratic	James Staples	1,370	9.17%	–
Total		14,948	–	–
Rejected, spoiled and declined		26	–	–
Eligible electors / Turnout		18,624	80.40%	–
Progressive Conservative pickup new district.				
Source(s) Source: "Calgary-Foothills Official Results 1971 Alberta general election". Alberta Heritage Community Foundation.

=== 1973 by-election ===
Alberta provincial by-election, June 25, 1973: Calgary-Foothills Death of Len Werry
Party	Candidate	Votes	%	±%
Progressive Conservative	Stewart McCrae	5,576	44.40%	-10.07%
Social Credit	Werner Schmidt	4,167	33.18%	-6.19%
New Democratic	Nancy Eng	2,079	16.55%	7.39%
Liberal	Robert Russell	725	5.77%	
Independent	Glenn Pylypa	13	0.10%	
Total		12,560		
Rejected, spoiled and declined		Unknown		
Eligible electors / Turnout		21,303	%	
Progressive Conservative hold		Swing		-8.13%

Modernization Society of Alberta candidate source: Calgary Herald June 26, 1973

=== 1975 ===
1975 Alberta general election
Party	Candidate	Votes	%	±%
Progressive Conservative	Stewart A. McCrae	10,917	67.63%	23.23%
Social Credit	Bill Campbell	2,587	16.03%	-17.15%
New Democratic	Ken Gee	1,366	8.46%	8.09%
Liberal	Hilda Armstrong	893	5.53%	-0.24%
Independent Liberal	Acker Winn	324	2.01%	–
Communist	David Gutnick	55	0.34%	–
Total		16,142	–	–
Rejected, spoiled and declined		31	–	–
Eligible electors / Turnout		24,776	65.28%	
Progressive Conservative hold		Swing		19.75%
Source(s) Source: "Calgary-Foothills Official Results 1975 Alberta general election". Alberta Heritage Community Foundation.

=== 1979 ===
1979 Alberta general election
Party	Candidate	Votes	%	±%
Progressive Conservative	Stewart A. McCrae	7,518	62.01%	-5.62%
Social Credit	Lorraine Law	2,835	23.38%	7.36%
New Democratic	Steve G. Arnett	982	8.10%	-0.36%
Liberal	Catherine M. Fitzpatrick	789	6.51%	0.98%
Total		12,124	–	–
Rejected, spoiled and declined		23	–	–
Eligible electors / Turnout		19,210	63.23%	-2.04%
Progressive Conservative hold		Swing		-6.49%
Source(s) Source: "Calgary-Foothills Official Results 1979 Alberta general election". Alberta Heritage Community Foundation.

=== 1982 ===
1982 Alberta general election
Party	Candidate	Votes	%	±%
Progressive Conservative	Janet Koper	9,708	66.93%	4.92%
New Democratic	Joanne Hedenstrom	2,249	15.50%	7.41%
Western Canada Concept	Robert Moyor	1,438	9.91%	–
Independent	Carol Stein	570	3.93%	–
Liberal	Larry Adorjan	540	3.72%	-2.78%
Total		14,505	–	–
Rejected, spoiled and declined		1	–	–
Eligible electors / Turnout		21,217	68.37%	5.14%
Progressive Conservative hold		Swing		6.40%
Source(s) Source: "Calgary-Foothills Official Results 1982 Alberta general election". Alberta Heritage Community Foundation.

=== 1986 ===
1986 Alberta general election
Party	Candidate	Votes	%	±%
Progressive Conservative	Janet Koper	6,111	55.32%	-11.61%
New Democratic	Thora Miessner	2,572	23.28%	7.78%
Liberal	Len Wolstenholme	1,741	15.76%	12.04%
Representative	J. Allen Howard	623	5.64%	–
Total		11,047	–	–
Rejected, spoiled and declined		6	–	–
Eligible electors / Turnout		22,786	48.51%	-19.86%
Progressive Conservative hold		Swing		-9.69%
Source(s) Source: "Calgary-Foothills Official Results 1986 Alberta general election". Alberta Heritage Community Foundation.

=== 1989 ===
1989 Alberta general election
Party	Candidate	Votes	%	±%
Progressive Conservative	Patricia Black	5,341	37.25%	-18.07%
Liberal	Harvey Locke	4,866	33.93%	18.17%
New Democratic	Theresa Catherine Baxter	4,133	28.82%	5.54%
Total		14,340	–	–
Rejected, spoiled and declined		43	–	–
Eligible electors / turnout		23,779	60.49%	11.98%
Progressive Conservative hold		Swing		-14.36%
Source(s) Source: "Calgary-Foothills Official Results 1989 Alberta general election". Alberta Heritage Community Foundation.

=== 1993 ===
1993 Alberta general election
Party	Candidate	Votes	%	±%
Progressive Conservative	Patricia Black	8,129	52.80%	15.56%
Liberal	Frances Wright	6,146	39.92%	5.99%
New Democratic	Don McMillan	965	6.27%	-22.55%
Natural Law	Anna Novikov	155	1.01%	–
Total		15,395	–	–
Rejected, spoiled and declined		26	–	–
Eligible electors / Turnout		23,041	66.93%	6.44%
Progressive Conservative hold		Swing		4.78%
Source(s) Source: "Calgary-Foothills Official Results 1993 Alberta general election". Alberta Heritage Community Foundation.

=== 1997 ===
1997 Alberta general election
Party	Candidate	Votes	%	±%
Progressive Conservative	Patricia Black	8,849	60.43%	7.63%
Liberal	Albert W. Ludwig	4,339	29.63%	-10.29%
Social Credit	Kevin Davidson	735	5.02%	–
New Democratic	Brenda Wadey	720	4.92%	-1.35%
Total		14,643	–	–
Rejected, spoiled and declined		21	12	0
Eligible electors / Turnout		28,518	51.42%	-15.51%
Progressive Conservative hold		Swing		8.96%
Source(s) Source: "Calgary-Foothills Official Results 1997 Alberta general election". Alberta Heritage Community Foundation. Alberta. Chief Electoral Officer (1997). Report of the Chief Electoral Officer, November, 1996 general enumeration and Tuesday, March 11, 1997 general election Twenty-fourth Legislative Assembly. Edmonton: Alberta Legislative Assembly, Office of the Chief Electoral Officer.

=== 2001 ===
2001 Alberta general election
Party	Candidate	Votes	%	±%
Progressive Conservative	Pat Nelson	12,070	67.41%	6.98%
Liberal	Harry B. Chase	5,051	28.21%	-1.42%
New Democratic	Jon Adams	784	4.38%	-0.54%
Total		17,905	–	–
Rejected, spoiled and declined		45	32	9
Eligible electors / Turnout		34,208	52.50%	1.08%
Progressive Conservative hold		Swing		4.20%
Source(s) Source: "Calgary-Foothills Official Results 2001 Alberta general election". Alberta Heritage Community Foundation. Alberta. Chief Electoral Officer (2001). The report of the Chief Electoral Officer on the 2000 provincial confirmation process and Monday, March 12, 2001, Provincial General Election of the twenty-fifth Legislative Assembly. Edmonton: Alberta Legislative Assembly, Office of the Chief Electoral Officer.

=== 2004 ===
2004 Alberta general election
Party	Candidate	Votes	%	±%
Progressive Conservative	Len Webber	5,819	56.77%	-10.64%
Liberal	Stephen Jenuth	3,561	34.74%	6.53%
Alberta Alliance	Vincent S. Jansen-Van Doorn	472	4.60%	–
New Democratic	Malcolm Forster	398	3.88%	-0.50%
Total		10,250	–	–
Rejected, spoiled and declined		20	27	3
Eligible electors / Turnout		27,739	37.03%	-15.46%
Progressive Conservative hold		Swing		-8.59%
Source(s) Source: "00 - Calgary-Foothills (electoral district". officialresults.elections.ab.ca. Elections Alberta. 2004. Alberta. Chief Electoral Officer (2005). Report of the Chief Electoral Officer on the General Enumeration and General Election of the Twenty-sixth Legislative Assembly (Report). Edmonton: Alberta Legislative Assembly, Office of the Chief Electoral Officer.

=== 2008 ===
2008 Alberta general election
Party	Candidate	Votes	%	±%
Progressive Conservative	Len Webber	6,088	48.20%	-8.57%
Liberal	Mike Robinson	4,909	38.86%	4.12%
Wildrose Alliance	Kevin Legare	972	7.70%	–
Green	Ian D. Groll	411	3.25%	–
New Democratic	Stephanie Sundberg	251	1.99%	-1.90%
Total		12,631	–	–
Rejected, spoiled and declined		36	23	2
Eligible electors / Turnout		33,083	38.29%	1.26%
Progressive Conservative hold		Swing		-6.35%
Source(s) Source: "10 - Calgary-Foothills (electoral district)". officialresults.elections.ab.ca. Elections Alberta. Chief Electoral Officer (2008). The Report on the March 3, 2008 Provincial General Election of the Twenty-Seventh Legislative Assembly (Report). Edmonton, Alta.: Elections Alberta. pp. 206–209.

=== 2012 ===
2012 Alberta general election
Party	Candidate	Votes	%	±%
Progressive Conservative	Len Webber	8,251	53.65%	5.46%
Wildrose Alliance	Dustin Nau	5,135	33.39%	25.70%
Liberal	Kurt Hansen	1,414	9.19%	-29.67%
New Democratic	Jennifer Carkner	578	3.76%	1.77%
Total		15,378	–	–
Rejected, spoiled and declined		120	39	2
Eligible electors / Turnout		29,806	52.00%	13.71%
Progressive Conservative hold		Swing		5.46%
Source(s) Source: "11 - Calgary-Foothills, 2012 Alberta general election". officialresults.elections.ab.ca. Elections Alberta. Chief Electoral Officer (2012). The Report of the Chief Electoral Officer on the 2011 Provincial Enumeration and Monday, April 23, 2012 Provincial General Election of the Twenty-eighth Legislative Assembly (PDF) (Report). Edmonton, Alta.: Elections Alberta. Archived (PDF) from the original on May 6, 2021.

=== 2014 by-election ===
Alberta provincial by-election, October 27, 2014: Calgary-Foothills Resignation of Len Webber on September 28, 2014
Party	Candidate	Votes	%	±%
Progressive Conservative	Jim Prentice	6,912	58.37	+4.71
Wildrose	Kathy Macdonald	3,545	29.94	-3.46
Liberal	Robert Prcic	458	3.87	-5.33
New Democratic	Jennifer Burgess	444	3.75	-0.01
Green	Polly Knowlton Cockett	248	2.09	—
Alberta Party	Michelle Glavine	212	1.79	—
Independent	Dave Woody Phillips	23	0.19	—
Total		11,842	—	—
Rejected, spoiled and declined		14	33	19
Eligible electors / turnout		32,743	36.27	—
Progressive Conservative hold		Swing		+4.72
Source(s) Alberta. Chief Electoral Officer (2015). Report on the October 27, 2014 By-elections in: Calgary-Elbow, Calgary-Foothills, Calgary-West, Edmonton-Whitemud (PDF) (Report). Edmonton: Legislative Assembly of Alberta; Chief Electoral Officer. ISBN 978-098653678-6.

=== 2015 ===
2015 Alberta general election
Party	Candidate	Votes	%	±%
Progressive Conservative	Jim Prentice	7,163	40.33%	-18.04%
New Democratic	Anne Wilson	5,748	32.36%	28.61%
Wildrose	Keelan Frey	3,216	18.11%	-11.83%
Liberal	Ali Bin Zahid	1,271	7.16%	-3.29%
Green	Janet Keeping	363	2.04%	-0.05%
Total		17,761	–	–
Rejected, spoiled and declined		52	28	13
Eligible electors / turnout		34,000	52.43%	
Progressive Conservative hold		Swing		-6.15%
Source(s) Because Jim Prentice disclaimed his right to become an MLA before the end of the appeal period for the official results, this riding's election was declared void. Source: "11 - Calgary-Foothills, 2015 Alberta general election". officialresults.elections.ab.ca. Elections Alberta. Chief Electoral Officer (2016). 2015 General Election. A Report of the Chief Electoral Officer (PDF) (Report). Edmonton, Alta.: Elections Alberta.

=== 2015 by-election ===
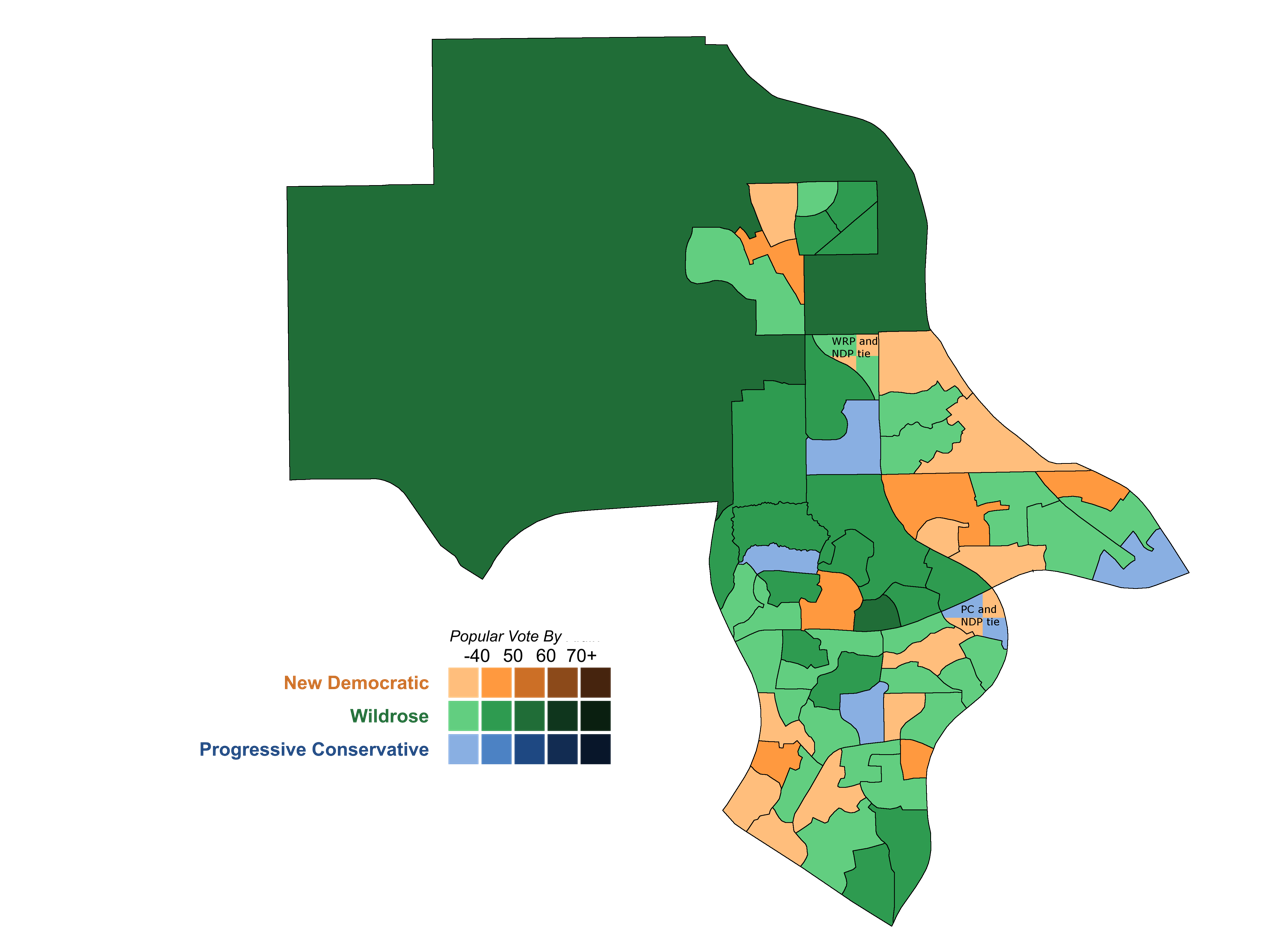
Results by polling division, 2015

Alberta provincial by-election, September 3, 2015: Calgary-Foothills Voiding of general election results due to Jim Prentice disclaiming his seat.
Party	Candidate	Votes	%	±%
Wildrose	Prasad Panda	4,872	38.25	+20.14
New Democratic	Bob Hawkesworth	3,274	25.70	-6.64
Progressive Conservative	Blair Houston	2,760	21.67	-18.82
Liberal	Ali Bin Zahid	792	6.22	-0.94
Alberta Party	Mark Taylor	615	4.83	+4.83
Green	Janet Keeping	378	2.97	+0.93
Independent	Antoni Grochowski	46	0.36	–
Total valid votes		12,737	–	–
Rejected, spoiled and declined		26	10	2
Eligible electors / turnout		33,728	37.76%	-14.67%
Wildrose gain from Progressive Conservative		Swing		+20.14
Source(s) Alberta. Chief Electoral Officer (2016). Report of the Chief Electoral Officer on the September 3, 2015 By-election in Calgary-Foothills and the March 22, 2016 By-election in Calgary-Greenway (PDF) (Report). Edmonton: Legislative Assembly of Alberta; Chief Electoral Officer. pp. 14–17. ISBN 978-0-9949577-1-9.

=== 2019 ===
2019 Alberta general election
Party	Candidate	Votes	%	±%	Expenditures
United Conservative	Jason Luan	12,277	56.99%	-2.93%	$92,648
New Democratic	Sameena Arif	6,985	32.42%	6.72%	$15,707
Alberta Party	Jennifer Wyness	1,680	7.80%	2.97%	$6,082
Liberal	Andrea Joyce	379	1.76%	-4.46%	$500
Freedom Conservative	Kari Pomerleau	142	0.66%	–	$1,802
Alberta Independence	Kyle Miller	80	0.37%	–	$514
Total		21,543	–	–	
Rejected, spoiled and declined		125	46	8	
Eligible electors / turnout		32,774	66.14%		
United Conservative hold		Swing			
Source(s) Source: Elections Alberta Note: Expenses is the sum of "Election Expenses", "Other Expenses" and "Transfers Issued". The Elections Act limits "Election Expenses" to $50,000.

=== 2023 ===
2023 Alberta general election: Calgary-Foothills
Party	Candidate	Votes	%	±%
New Democratic	Court Ellingson	11,054	49.92	+17.50
United Conservative	Jason Luan	10,793	48.74	-8.24
Independent	Keenan Demontigny	190	0.86	–
Solidarity Movement	Kami Dass	105	0.47	–
Total		22,142	99.27	–
Rejected and declined		162	0.73	
Turnout		22,304	61.95	
Eligible voters		36,006		
New Democratic gain from United Conservative		Swing		+12.87
Source(s) Source: Elections Alberta

== Senate nominee election results ==
=== 2004 ===
2004 Senate nominee election results: Calgary-Foothills				Turnout 37.13%	
Affiliation	Candidate	Votes	% votes	% ballots	Rank
Progressive Conservative	Bert Brown	4,540	16.89%	53.05%	1
Progressive Conservative	Betty Unger	4,004	14.90%	46.79%	2
Progressive Conservative	Jim Silye	3,965	14.75%	46.33%	5
Progressive Conservative	David Usherwood	2,928	10.89%	34.21%	6
Progressive Conservative	Cliff Breitkreuz	2,680	9.97%	31.32%	3
Independent	Link Byfield	2,344	8.72%	27.39%	4
Independent	Tom Sindlinger	1,796	6.68%	20.99%	9
Alberta Alliance	Vance Gough	1,673	6.22%	19.55%	8
Alberta Alliance	Michael Roth	1,566	5.83%	18.30%	7
Alberta Alliance	Gary Horan	1,386	5.15%	16.20%	10
Total votes		26,882	100%		
Total ballots		8,558	3.14 votes per ballot		
Rejected, spoiled and declined		1,741			
27,739 eligible electors

Voters had the option of selecting four candidates on the ballot

== Student vote results ==
=== 2004 ===
Participating schools
Jerry Potts Elementary

On November 19, 2004, a student vote was conducted at participating Alberta schools to parallel the 2004 Alberta general election results. The vote was designed to educate students and simulate the electoral process for persons who have not yet reached the legal majority. The vote was conducted in 80 of the 83 provincial electoral districts with students voting for actual election candidates. Schools with a large student body that reside in another electoral district had the option to vote for candidates outside of the electoral district then where they were physically located.

2004 Alberta student vote results
Affiliation	Candidate	Votes	%
Progressive Conservative	Len Webber	28	39.44%
Liberal	Stephen Jenuth	17	23.94%
New Democratic	Malcolm Forster	14	19.72%
Alberta Alliance	Vincent Jansen van Doorn	12	16.90%
Total		71	100%
Rejected, spoiled and declined		2	

== See also ==
- List of Alberta provincial electoral districts
- Canadian provincial electoral districts
