= Sir John A Macdonald Junior High School =

Sir John A. Macdonald

Location
- 6600 - 4 Street NW; Calgary, Alberta, T2K 1C2; Canada; 51.1115°N 114.0702°W

Information
- School type: Public
- Motto: Together we make a difference
- Founded: 1966
- School board: Calgary Board of Education
- Superintendent: David Stevenson
- Area trustee: Lynn Ferguson
- Principal: Michelle Hornby
- Grades: 7-9
- Enrollment: 642 (2015-2016)
- Language: English
- Area: Area II
- Colours: Yellow and Black
- Mascot: Mustang
- Website: school.cbe.ab.ca/school/SirJohnAMacdonald

Sir John A. Macdonald Junior High School (SJAM) is a Junior High School in Calgary, Alberta, Canada. It was founded in 1967 and named after the first prime minister of Canada Sir John Alexander Macdonald. The school has 4 core subjects: math, science, social studies and language arts. There are also many options students can choose from: food, fashion, art, industrial arts, guitar, band, drama, yearbook, communication technology and information processing. This school has a total of 32 classrooms.

== Community ==
SJAM has a diverse community and is designated for several different areas of Calgary. Most of the school's events have a charitable component. The students of SJAM find that it is a great school in the terms of Teachers and Community, but found that it needed more funding for renovations.

== Facilities ==
In 2000 the School facility evaluation project found that the buildings in the school were in need of major renovation.

== Health and nutrition ==
A school survey in 2001 revealed that the students were making their nutrition break into a healthy food break. The school proceeded to remove food with poor nutritional value and instituted "Fitness Weekdays" into their physical education program. Starting in 2005 the school participated in a Calgary region health program for schools, designed to show the importance of proper diet and an active lifestyle to students. The school even placed timers on their vending machines so that only healthy food was available during the mornings.

The group "Action on Smoking and Health" visited the school in 2006 to warn the students about the dangers of smoking. There was concern about the visibility of tobacco displays for children, which they called Powerwall advertising.
