= Amanda Chapman =

Canadian politician from Alberta

Amanda Chapman MLA

Member of the Legislative Assembly of Alberta for Calgary-Beddington
- Incumbent
- Assumed office May 29, 2023
- Preceded by: Josephine Pon

Personal details
- Party: NDP
- Education: Haskayne School of Business
- Occupation: Communications consultant

Amanda Chapman is a Canadian politician from the Alberta New Democratic Party who was elected as a Member of the Legislative Assembly of Alberta for Calgary-Beddington in the 2023 Alberta general election. As of June 21, 2024, she serves as the Official Opposition critic for Education and for Services to Children with Disabilities.

Chapman has a business degree from the Haskayne School of Business at the University of Calgary.

== Electoral history ==
2023 Alberta general election: Calgary-Beddington
Party	Candidate	Votes	%	±%
New Democratic	Amanda Chapman	10,269	49.66	+13.95
United Conservative	Josephine Pon	9,726	47.04	-6.07
Alberta Party	Wayne Jackson	473	2.29	-5.93
Liberal	Zarnab Shahid Zafar	210	1.02	-0.67
Total		20,678	99.32	–
Rejected and declined		142	0.68	
Turnout		20,820	58.28	
Eligible voters		35,724		
New Democratic gain from United Conservative		Swing		+10.01
Source(s) Source: Elections Alberta

2019 Alberta general election: Calgary-Beddington
Party	Candidate	Votes	%	±%	Expenditures
United Conservative	Josephine Pon	11,625	53.11	-3.74	$31,776
New Democratic	Amanda Chapman	7,818	35.71	-0.93	$15,589
Alberta Party	Carol-Lynn Darch	1,799	8.22	–	$2,014
Liberal	Chandan Tadavalkar	370	1.69	-2.91	$1,651
Alberta Independence	Tom Grbich	161	0.74	–	$500
Independent	Alexander Dea	117	0.53	–	$1,101
Total		21,890	99.53	–	
Rejected, spoiled and declined		103	0.47	–	
Turnout		21,993	63.12		
Eligible voters		34,845			
United Conservative notional hold		Swing		-1.41	
Source(s) Source: Elections Alberta Note: Expenses is the sum of "Election Expenses", "Other Expenses" and "Transfers Issued". The Elections Act limits "Election Expenses" to $50,000.
