= Pat Nelson (Alberta politician) =

Canadian politician

The Honourable Pat Nelson ECA

MLA for Calgary-Foothills
- In office March 20, 1989 – November 22, 2004
- Preceded by: Janet Koper
- Succeeded by: Len Webber

Personal details
- Party: Progressive Conservative

Patricia Nelson ECA née Black is a former provincial level politician from Alberta, Canada. As a member of the ruling Progressive Conservative Party of Alberta, she served as a Member of the Legislative Assembly of Alberta for the Calgary-Foothills electoral district from 1989 to 2004. During this time she served as a minister in a number of portfolios: Energy, Economic Development and Tourism, Government Services, and Finance. She also served as Deputy Government House Leader and as a member of Treasury Board.

== Political career ==
Black was elected to the Legislative Assembly of Alberta for the first time in a hotly contested three-way race in the 1989 Alberta general election. She won her second term in office in the 1993 Alberta general election, winning in a landslide. She won her third term in office in the 1997 Alberta general election, again by a large majority, married in 1998 and changed her surname to Nelson.

Nelson won her fourth term in office with another massive landslide victory in the 2001 Alberta general election.

During her years as finance minister in the governments of Premier Ralph Klein, Nelson oversaw the retirement of the Alberta provincial debt.

Legislative Assembly of Alberta
Preceded by Janet Koper	MLA Calgary Foothills; 1989–2004	Succeeded by Len Webber
