= 24th Alberta Legislature =

- Majority parliament
- Apr. 14, 1997 – Feb. 12, 2001

Parliament leaders
- Premier: Ralph Klein; December 14, 1992 – December 14, 2006
- Cabinet: Klein cabinet
- Leader of the Opposition: Howard Sapers; April 17, 1998 – March 12, 2001

Party caucuses
- Government: Progressive Conservative Association
- Opposition: Liberal Party
- Recognized: New Democratic Party

Legislative Assembly
- Speaker of the Assembly: Ken Kowalski; April 14, 1997 – May 23, 2012
- Government House leader: Dave Hancock; May 26, 1999 – November 24, 2006
- Members: 83 MLA seats

Sovereign
- Monarch: Elizabeth II; February 6, 1952 – September 8, 2022
- Lieutenant governor: Hon. Bud Olson; 17 April 1996 – 10 February 2000
- Hon. Lois Hole; 10 February 2000 – 6 January 2005

Sessions
- 1st session April 14, 1997 – January 26, 1998
- 2nd session January 27, 1998 – February 15, 1999
- 3rd session February 16, 1999 – February 16, 2000
- 4th session February 17, 2000 – February 11, 2001
- 5th session February 12, 2001 – February 12, 2001
← 23rd	→ 25th

The 24th Alberta Legislative Assembly was in session from April 14, 1997, to February 12, 2001, with the membership of the assembly determined by the results of the 1997 Alberta general election held on March 11, 1997. The Legislature officially resumed on April 14, 1997, and continued until the fifth session was prorogued and dissolved on February 12, 2001, prior to the 2001 Alberta general election on March 12, 2001.

Alberta's twenty-fourth government was controlled by the majority Progressive Conservative Association of Alberta, led by Premier Ralph Klein. The Official Opposition was led by Howard Sapers of the Liberal Party. The Speaker was Ken Kowalski.

== Party standings after the 24th General Election ==
****	****	****	****	****	****	****	****	****	****	****	****	****	****	****	****	****
****	****	****	****	****	****	****	****	****	****	****	****	****
****	****	****	****	****	****	****	****	****	****	****	****	****	****	****	****
****
****
****
****	****	****	****	****	****	****	****	****	****	****	****	****	****	****	****	****
****	****	****	****	****	****	****	****	****	****	****	****	****	****	****	****	****
****	****	****	****	****	****	****	****	****	****	****	****	****	****	****	****	****

== Members elected ==
For complete electoral history, see individual districts

24th Alberta Legislative Assembly
District	Member	Party	First elected/ previously elected	No.# of term(s)
Athabasca-Wabasca	Mike Cardinal	Progressive Conservative	1989	3rd term
Airdrie-Rocky View	Carol Haley	Progressive Conservative	1993	2nd term
Banff-Cochrane	Janis Tarchuk	Progressive Conservative	1997	1st term
Barrhead-Westlock	Ken Kowalski	Progressive Conservative	1979	6th term
Bonnyville-Cold Lake	Denis Ducharme	Progressive Conservative	1997	1st term
Calgary-Bow	Bonnie Laing	Progressive Conservative	1989	3rd term
Calgary-Buffalo	Gary Dickson	Liberal	1992	3rd term
Calgary-Cross	Yvonne Fritz	Progressive Conservative	1993	2nd term
Calgary-Currie	Jocelyn Burgener	Progressive Conservative	1993	2nd term
Calgary-East	Moe Amery	Progressive Conservative	1993	2nd term
Calgary-Egmont	Denis Herard	Progressive Conservative	1993	2nd term
Calgary-Elbow	Ralph Klein	Progressive Conservative	1989	3rd term
Calgary-Fish Creek	Heather Forsyth	Progressive Conservative	1993	2nd term
Calgary-Foothills	Pat Black^{1}	Progressive Conservative	1989	3rd term
Calgary-Fort	Wayne Cao	Progressive Conservative	1997	1st term
Calgary-Glenmore	Ron Stevens	Progressive Conservative	1997	1st term
Calgary-Lougheed	Marlene Graham	Progressive Conservative	1997	1st term
Calgary-McCall	Shiraz Shariff	Progressive Conservative	1995	2nd term
Calgary-Montrose	Hung Pham	Progressive Conservative	1993	2nd term
Calgary-Mountain View	Mark Hlady	Progressive Conservative	1993	2nd term
Calgary-North Hill	Richard Magnus	Progressive Conservative	1993	2nd term
Calgary-North West	Greg Melchin	Progressive Conservative	1997	1st term
Calgary-Nose Creek	Gary Mar	Progressive Conservative	1993	2nd term
Calgary-Shaw	Jon Havelock	Progressive Conservative	1993	2nd term
Calgary-Varsity	Murray Smith	Progressive Conservative	1993	2nd term
Calgary-West	Karen Kryczka	Progressive Conservative	1997	1st term
Cardston-Taber-Warner	Ron Hierath	Progressive Conservative	1993	2nd term
Clover Bar-Fort Saskatchewan	Rob Lougheed	Progressive Conservative	1997	1st term
Cypress-Medicine Hat	Lorne Taylor	Progressive Conservative	1993	2nd term
Drayton Valley-Calmar	Tom Thurber	Progressive Conservative	1989	3rd term
Drumheller-Chinook	Shirley McClellan	Progressive Conservative	1987	4th term
Dunvegan	Glen Clegg	Progressive Conservative	1986	4th term
Edmonton-Beverly-Clareview	Julius Yankowsky	Progressive Conservative	1993 (Note: First elected as a Liberal)	2nd term
Edmonton-Calder	Lance White	Liberal	1993	2nd term
Edmonton-Castle Downs	Pamela Paul	Liberal	1997	1st term
Edmonton-Castle Downs	Pamela Paul	Independent	1997	1st term
Edmonton-Centre	Laurie Blakeman	Liberal	1997	1st term
Edmonton-Ellerslie	Debby Carlson	Liberal	1993	2nd term
Edmonton-Glengarry	Bill Bonner	Liberal	1997	1st term
Edmonton-Glenora	Howard Sapers	Liberal	1993	2nd term
Edmonton-Gold Bar	Hugh MacDonald	Liberal	1997	1st term
Edmonton-Highlands	Pam Barrett	NDP	1986, 1997	3rd term*
Edmonton-Highlands	Brian Mason (2000)	NDP	2000	1st term
Edmonton-Manning	Ed Gibbons	Liberal	1997	1st term
Edmonton-McClung	Grant Mitchell	Liberal	1986	4th term
Edmonton-McClung	Nancy MacBeth (1998)	Liberal	1986, (Note: Edmonton-Glenora (First elected as Progressive Conservative)) 1998	3rd term*
Edmonton-Meadowlark	Karen Leibovici	Liberal	1993	2nd term
Edmonton-Mill Creek	Gene Zwozdesky	Liberal	1993	2nd term
Edmonton-Mill Creek	Gene Zwozdesky	Independent	1993	2nd term
Edmonton-Mill Creek	Gene Zwozdesky	Progressive Conservative	1993	2nd term
Edmonton-Mill Woods	Don Massey	Liberal	1993	2nd term
Edmonton-Norwood	Sue Olsen	Liberal	1997	1st term
Edmonton-Riverview	Linda Sloan	Liberal	1997	1st term
Edmonton-Rutherford	Percy Wickman	Liberal	1989	3rd term
Edmonton-Strathcona	Raj Pannu	NDP	1997	1st term
Edmonton-Whitemud	David Hancock	Progressive Conservative	1997	1st term
Fort McMurray	Guy C. Boutilier	Progressive Conservative	1997	1st term
Grande Prairie-Smoky	Walter Paszkowski	Progressive Conservative	1989	3rd term
Grande Prairie-Wapiti	Wayne Jacques	Progressive Conservative	1993	2nd term
Highwood	Don Tannas	Progressive Conservative	1989	3rd term
Innisfail-Sylvan Lake	Gary Severtson	Progressive Conservative	1989	3rd term
Lac La Biche-St. Paul	Paul Langevin	Progressive Conservative	1993	2nd term
Lacombe-Stettler	Judy Gordon	Progressive Conservative	1993	2nd term
Lesser Slave Lake	Pearl Calahasen	Progressive Conservative	1989	3rd term
Leduc	Albert Klapstein	Progressive Conservative	1997	1st term
Lethbridge-East	Ken Nicol	Liberal	1993	2nd term
Lethbridge-West	Clint Dunford	Progressive Conservative	1993	2nd term
Little Bow	Barry McFarland	Progressive Conservative	1992	3rd term
Livingstone-Macleod	David Coutts	Progressive Conservative	1993	2nd term
Medicine Hat	Rob Renner	Progressive Conservative	1993	2nd term
Olds-Didsbury-Three Hills	Richard Marz	Progressive Conservative	1997	1st term
Peace River	Gary Friedel	Progressive Conservative	1993	2nd term
Ponoka-Rimbey	Halvar Jonson	Progressive Conservative	1982	5th term
Red Deer-North	Stockwell Day	Progressive Conservative	1986	4th term
Red Deer-North	Mary Anne Jablonski (2000)	Progressive Conservative	2000	1st term
Red Deer-South	Victor Doerksen	Progressive Conservative	1993	2nd term
Redwater	Dave Broda	Progressive Conservative	1997	1st term
Rocky Mountain House	Ty Lund	Progressive Conservative	1989	3rd term
Sherwood Park	Iris Evans	Progressive Conservative	1997	1st term
St. Albert	Mary O'Neill	Progressive Conservative	1997	1st term
Spruce Grove-Sturgeon-St. Albert	Colleen Soetaert	Liberal	1993	2nd term
Stony Plain	Stan Woloshyn	Progressive Conservative	1989 (Note: First elected as a NDP)	3rd term
Strathmore-Brooks	Lyle Oberg	Progressive Conservative	1993	2nd term
Vegreville-Viking	Ed Stelmach	Progressive Conservative	1993	2nd term
Vermilion-Lloydminster	Steve West	Progressive Conservative	1986	4th term
Wainwright	Robert Fischer	Progressive Conservative	1982	5th term
West Yellowhead	Ivan Strang	Progressive Conservative	1997	1st term
Wetaskiwin-Camrose	LeRoy Johnson	Progressive Conservative	1997	1st term
Whitecourt-Ste. Anne	Peter Trynchy	Progressive Conservative	1971	8th term

Note:

- ^{1} Pat Black later changed her last name to Nelson.

== Standings changes since the 24th general election ==
Number of members per party by date	1997	1998				1999	2000				
Number of members per party by date	Mar 11	May 11	Jun 17	Jul ?	Aug ?	Nov 15	Feb 2	Jun 12	Jul 11	Sep 25	Oct 4
Progressive Conservative	63				64				63	64	
Liberal	18	17	18	17		16					15
New Democratic	2						1	2			
Independent	0			1	0	1					
Total members	83	82	83				82	83	82	83	82
Vacant	0	1	0				1	0	1	0	1
Government Majority	43	44	43		45		46	45	44	45	46

1. May 11, 1998 Grant Mitchell, Edmonton McClung resigns.
2. June 17, 1998 Nancy MacBeth, Edmonton-McClung elected in a by-election.
3. July 1998 Gene Zwozdesky, Edmonton Mill Creek sits as an independent.
4. August 1998 Gene Zwozdesky, Edmonton-Mill Creek joins the Progressive Conservative caucus.
5. November 15, 1999 Pamela Paul-Zobaric, Edmonton Castle Downs sits as an independent.
6. February 2, 2000 Pam Barrett, Edmonton-Highlands resigns.
7. June 12, 2000 Brian Mason, Edmonton-Highlands elected in a by-election.
8. July 11, 2000 Stockwell Day, Red Deer-North resigns.
9. September 25, 2000 Mary Anne Jablonski, Red Deer-North elected in a by-election.
10. October 4, 2000 Sue Olsen, Edmonton-Norwood resigns to run in federal election.
