= 23rd Alberta Legislature =

Canadian Legislative Assembly

- Majority parliament
- Aug. 30, 1993 – Feb. 11, 1997

Parliament leaders
- Premier: Ralph Klein; 14 December 1992 - 14 December 2006
- Cabinet: Klein cabinet
- Leader of the Opposition: Laurence Decore; June 15, 1993 – July 15, 1994
- Grant Mitchell; November 12, 1994 – April 17, 1998

Party caucuses
- Government: Progressive Conservative Association
- Opposition: Liberal Party

Legislative Assembly
- Speaker of the Assembly: Stanley Schumacher; 30 August 1993 - 17 April 1997
- Members: 83 MLA seats

Sovereign
- Monarch: Elizabeth II; February 6, 1952 – September 8, 2022
- Lieutenant governor: Hon. Gordon Towers; 11 March 1991 - 17 April 1996
- Hon. Bud Olson; 17 April 1996 - 10 February 2000

Sessions
- 1st session August 30, 1993 – February 9, 1994
- 2nd session February 10, 1994 – February 12, 1995
- 3rd session February 13, 1995 – February 12, 1996
- 4th session February 13, 1996 – February 9, 1997
- 5th session February 10, 1997 – February 11, 1997
← 22nd	→ 24th

The 23rd Alberta Legislative Assembly was in session from August 30, 1993, to February 11, 1997, with the membership of the assembly determined by the results of the 1993 Alberta general election held on June 15, 1993. The Legislature officially resumed on August 30, 1993, and continued until the fifth session was prorogued and dissolved on February 11, 1997, prior to the 1997 Alberta general election on March 11, 1997.

Alberta's twenty-second government was controlled by the majority Progressive Conservative Association of Alberta, led by Premier Ralph Klein. The Official Opposition was led by Laurence Decore of the Liberal Party, and later Grant Mitchell. The Speaker was Stanley Schumacher.

== Bills ==
=== Freedom of Information and Protection of Privacy Act ===
The Freedom of Information and Protection of Privacy Act (FOIP Act) is the freedom of information and privacy act for Alberta, Canada. It was passed by the Alberta Legislature in June 1994 and came into force on October 1, 1995.

=== Civil Enforcement Act ===
The Civil Enforcement Act, S.A. 1994, c.C-10.5, is a law in Alberta, Canada. The law gave responsibility for seizures, evictions, repossessions, and enforcing court orders to authorized civil enforcement agencies. Sheriffs' Offices throughout the province closed, but The Office of the Sheriff - Civil Enforcement was created under the Court Services Division of Alberta Justice to monitor the civil enforcement agency activities and respond to complaints. The Act was proclaimed in force on January 1, 1996.

=== Electric Utilities Act ===
The Electric Utilities Act (1996) effective January 1, 1996, which created Power Pool of Alberta, a wholesale market clearing entity. The Power Pool was a not for profit entity that operated the "competitive wholesale market including dispatch of generation." The Electric Utilities Act stipulated all electric energy bought and sold in Alberta had to be exchanged through the Power Pool which "served as an independent, central, open access pool." It functioned as a "spot market intending to match the demand with the lowest cost supply and establish an hourly pool price." Alberta was the first Canadian province to implement a deregulated electricity market. Competitive wholesale markets were being fostered in the 1990s as part of the liberalization process of the 1990s changing some parameters such as the unbundling of generation, transmission and distribution functions of incumbent utilities. Local distribution utilities, either investor- or municipally owned, retained the obligation to supply and the 6 largest utilities were assigned a share of the output of existing generators at a fixed price.

== Party standings after the 23rd General Election ==
****	****	****	****	****	****	****	****	****	****	****	****	****	****	****
****	****	****	****	****	****	****	****	****	****	****	****	****	****	****
****	****	****	****	****	****	****	****	****	****	****	****	****	****	****
****
****
****
****	****	****	****	****	****	****	****	****	****	****	****	****	****	****
****	****	****	****	****	****	****	****	****	****	****	****	****	****	****
****	****	****	****	****	****	****	****	****	****	****	****	****	****	****

Affiliation	Members
Progressive Conservative Party	51
Liberal Party	32
Total	83

== Members elected ==
For complete electoral history, see individual districts

23rd Alberta Legislative Assembly
District	Member	Party	First elected/ previously elected	No.# of term(s)
Athabasca-Wabasca	Mike Cardinal	Progressive Conservative	1989	2nd term
Banff-Cochrane	Brian Evans	Progressive Conservative	1989	2nd term
Barrhead-Westlock	Ken Kowalski	Progressive Conservative	1979	5th term
Bonnyville	Leo Vasseur	Liberal	1993	1st term
Bow Valley	Lyle Oberg	Progressive Conservative	1993	1st term
Calgary-Bow	Bonnie Laing	Progressive Conservative	1989	2nd term
Calgary-Buffalo	Gary Dickson	Liberal	1992	2nd term
Calgary-Cross	Yvonne Fritz	Progressive Conservative	1993	1st term
Calgary-Currie	Jocelyn Burgener	Progressive Conservative	1993	1st term
Calgary-East	Moe Amery	Progressive Conservative	1993	1st term
Calgary-Egmont	Denis Herard	Progressive Conservative	1993	1st term
Calgary-Elbow	Ralph Klein	Progressive Conservative	1989	2nd term
Calgary-Fish Creek	Heather Forsyth	Progressive Conservative	1993	1st term
Calgary-Foothills	Pat Black^{1}	Progressive Conservative	1989	2nd term
Calgary-Glenmore	Dianne Mirosh	Progressive Conservative	1986	3rd term
Calgary-Lougheed	Jim Dinning	Progressive Conservative	1986	3rd term
Calgary-McCall	Harry Sohal	Progressive Conservative	1993	1st term
Calgary-McCall	Shiraz Shariff (1995)	Progressive Conservative	1995	1st term
Calgary-Montrose	Hung Pham	Progressive Conservative	1993	1st term
Calgary-Mountain View	Mark Hlady	Progressive Conservative	1993	1st term
Calgary-North Hill	Richard Magnus	Progressive Conservative	1993	1st term
Calgary-North West	Frank Bruseker	Liberal	1989	2nd term
Calgary-Nose Creek	Gary Mar	Progressive Conservative	1993	1st term
Calgary-Shaw	Jon Havelock	Progressive Conservative	1993	1st term
Calgary-Varsity	Murray Smith	Progressive Conservative	1993	1st term
Calgary-West	Danny Dalla-Longa	Liberal	1993	1st term
Cardston-Chief Mountain	Jack Ady	Progressive Conservative	1986	3rd term
Chinook	Shirley McClellan	Progressive Conservative	1987	3rd term
Clover Bar-Fort Saskatchewan	Muriel Abdurahman	Liberal	1993	1st term
Cypress-Medicine Hat	Lorne Taylor	Progressive Conservative	1993	1st term
Drayton Valley-Calmar	Tom Thurber	Progressive Conservative	1989	2nd term
Drumheller	Stanley Schumacher	Progressive Conservative	1986	3rd term
Dunvegan	Glen Clegg	Progressive Conservative	1986	3rd term
Edmonton-Avonmore	Gene Zwozdesky	Liberal	1993	1st term
Edmonton-Beverly-Belmont	Julius Yankowsky	Liberal	1993	1st term
Edmonton-Beverly-Belmont	Julius Yankowsky	Progressive Conservative	1993	1st term
Edmonton-Centre	Michael Henry	Liberal	1993	1st term
Edmonton-Ellerslie	Debby Carlson	Liberal	1993	1st term
Edmonton-Glengarry	Laurence Decore	Liberal	1989	2nd term
Edmonton-Glenora	Howard Sapers	Liberal	1993	1st term
Edmonton-Gold Bar	Bettie Hewes	Liberal	1986	3rd term
Edmonton-Highlands-Beverly	Alice Hanson	Liberal	1993	1st term
Edmonton-Manning	Peter Sekulic	Liberal	1993	1st term
Edmonton-Mayfield	Lance White	Liberal	1993	1st term
Edmonton-McClung	Grant Mitchell	Liberal	1986	3rd term
Edmonton-Meadowlark	Karen Leibovici	Liberal	1993	1st term
Edmonton-Mill Woods	Don Massey	Liberal	1993	1st term
Edmonton-Norwood	Andrew Beniuk	Liberal	1993	1st term
Edmonton-Norwood	Andrew Beniuk	Independent	1993	1st term
Edmonton-Norwood	Andrew Beniuk	Progressive Conservative	1993	1st term
Edmonton-Roper	Sine Chadi	Liberal	1993	1st term
Edmonton-Rutherford	Percy Wickman	Liberal	1989	2nd term
Edmonton-Strathcona	Al Zariwny	Liberal	1993	1st term
Edmonton-Whitemud	Mike Percy	Liberal	1993	1st term
Fort McMurray	Adam Germain	Liberal	1993	1st term
Grande Prairie-Smoky	Walter Paszkowski	Progressive Conservative	1989	2nd term
Grande Prairie-Wapiti	Wayne Jacques	Progressive Conservative	1993	1st term
Highwood	Don Tannas	Progressive Conservative	1989	2nd term
Innisfail-Sylvan Lake	Gary Severtson	Progressive Conservative	1989	2nd term
Lac La Biche-St. Paul	Paul Langevin	Liberal	1993	1st term
Lac La Biche-St. Paul	Paul Langevin	Independent	1993	1st term
Lac La Biche-St. Paul	Paul Langevin	Progressive Conservative	1993	1st term
Lacombe-Stettler	Judy Gordon	Progressive Conservative	1993	1st term
Lesser Slave Lake	Pearl Calahasen	Progressive Conservative	1989	2nd term
Leduc	Terry Kirkland	Liberal	1993	1st term
Lethbridge-East	Ken Nicol	Liberal	1993	1st term
Lethbridge-West	Clint Dunford	Progressive Conservative	1993	1st term
Little Bow	Barry McFarland	Progressive Conservative	1992	2nd term
Medicine Hat	Rob Renner	Progressive Conservative	1993	1st term
Olds-Didsbury	Roy Brassard	Progressive Conservative	1986	3rd term
Peace River	Gary Friedel	Progressive Conservative	1993	1st term
Pincher Creek-Macleod	David Coutts	Progressive Conservative	1993	1st term
Ponoka-Rimbey	Halvar Jonson	Progressive Conservative	1982	4th term
Red Deer North	Stockwell Day	Progressive Conservative	1986	3rd term
Red Deer South	Victor Doerksen	Progressive Conservative	1993	1st term
Redwater	Nicholas Taylor	Liberal	1986	3rd term
Redwater	Mary Anne Balsillie (1996)	Liberal	1996	1st term
Rocky Mountain House	Ty Lund	Progressive Conservative	1989	2nd term
Sherwood Park	Bruce Collingwood	Liberal	1993	1st term
St. Albert	Len Bracko	Liberal	1993	1st term
Spruce Grove-Sturgeon-St. Albert	Colleen Soetaert	Liberal	1993	1st term
Stony Plain	Stan Woloshyn	Progressive Conservative	1989 (Note: First elected as a NDP)	2nd term
Taber-Warner	Ron Hierath	Progressive Conservative	1993	1st term
Three Hills-Airdrie	Carol Haley	Progressive Conservative	1993	1st term
Vegreville-Viking	Ed Stelmach	Progressive Conservative	1993	1st term
Vermilion-Lloydminster	Steve West	Progressive Conservative	1986	3rd term
Wainwright	Robert Fischer	Progressive Conservative	1982	4th term
West Yellowhead	Duco Van Binsbergen	Liberal	1993	1st term
Wetaskiwin-Camrose	Ken Rostad	Progressive Conservative	1986	3rd term
Whitecourt-Ste. Anne	Peter Trynchy	Progressive Conservative	1971	7th term

Note:

- ^{1} Pat Black later changed her last name to Nelson.

== Standings changes since the 23rd general election ==
Membership changes in the 23rd Assembly
Date	Member Name	District	Party	Reason
November 15, 1994	Harry Sohal	Calgary-McCall	Progressive Conservative	Death of member.
1995	Paul Langevin	Lac La Biche-St. Paul	Progressive Conservative	Crosses the floor from the Liberals to the Progressive Conservatives
March 7, 1996	Nicholas Taylor	Redwater	Liberal	Resigned to be appointed to the Senate of Canada.
