= 25th Alberta Legislature =

Canadian Legislative Assembly

- Majority parliament
- April 9, 2001 – October 25, 2004

Parliament leaders
- Premier: Ralph Klein; December 14, 1992 – December 14, 2006
- Cabinet: Klein cabinet
- Leader of the Opposition: Ken Nicol; March 12, 2001 – March 14, 2004

Party caucuses
- Government: Progressive Conservative Association
- Opposition: Liberal Party
- Recognized: New Democratic Party
- Unrecognized: Alberta Alliance

Legislative Assembly
- Speaker of the Assembly: Ken Kowalski; April 14, 1997 – May 23, 2012
- Government House Leader: Dave Hancock; May 26, 1999 – November 24, 2006
- Members: 83 MLA seats

Sovereign
- Monarch: Elizabeth II; February 6, 1952 – September 8, 2022
- Lieutenant Governor: Hon. Lois Hole; February 10, 2000 – January 6, 2005

Sessions
- 1st session April 9, 2001 – November 29, 2001
- 2nd session February 26, 2002 – December 4, 2002
- 3rd session February 18, 2003 – December 3, 2003
- 4th session February 17, 2004 – October 24, 2004
← 24th	→ 26th

The 25th Alberta Legislative Assembly was in session from April 9, 2001, to October 25, 2004, with the membership of the assembly determined by the results of the 2001 Alberta general election held on March 12, 2001. The Legislature officially resumed on April 9, 2001, and continued until the fourth session was prorogued and dissolved on October 25, 2004, prior to the 2004 Alberta general election on November 22, 2004.

Alberta's twenty-fifth government was controlled by the majority Progressive Conservative Association of Alberta, led by Premier Ralph Klein. The Official Opposition was led by Ken Nicol of the Liberal Party. The Speaker was Ken Kowalski. With the exception of the three MLAs listed below, all members held their seats until dissolution of the legislature.

== History ==
The 25th Legislative Assembly was ushered in with a massive Progressive Conservative majority, with Alberta being dubbed Ralph's World following the 2001 general election. The official opposition Liberals began a turbulent period that would see the party go through four leaders.

The third party Alberta New Democrats also changed leaders in July 2004 with the retirement of Raj Pannu and choice of Brian Mason as new leader.

Towards the end of the legislature for the first time since 1985, a new party caucus was formed. Edmonton-Norwood MLA Gary Masyk would cross the floor to the Alberta Alliance which had been formed in 2002 and registered in 2003 creating the caucus for that party. His reason for leaving was the Premier's interference in the 2004 federal election that coincided with a sharp decline in poll numbers that kept the federal Conservatives from winning the election. His electoral district was also abolished in the 2004 Alberta electoral boundary re-distribution.

Support the Progressive Conservatives softened through the reign of the Assembly but still remained high during the 2004 general election.

== Bills ==
=== Adult Interdependent Relationships Act ===
The Adult Interdependent Relationships Act (S.A. 2002, c. A-4.5) was passed by the Alberta Legislature on December 4, 2002, and proclaimed in force on June 1, 2003. The act did not amend Alberta's Marriage Act, but did amend 69 other Alberta laws following the 1999 landmark Supreme Court of Canada ruling in the case of M. v. H., which essentially required all provinces to extend the benefits of common-law marriage to same-sex couples, under the equality provisions of Section Fifteen of the Canadian Charter of Rights and Freedoms. Owing to the conservative political climate in the province, the government of Alberta was slow to respond, but in 2000 Alberta did amend the provincial Marriage Act to specifically limit marriage to different-sex couples. The Act was based on the January 2002 Alberta Law Reform Institute recommendations in Recognition of Rights and Obligations in Same-Sex Relationships which was funded in part by the provincial government.

=== Electoral Divisions Act ===
The Electoral Divisions Act (S.A. 2003, c. E-4.1) was passed by the Alberta Legislature during the third session, and received Royal Assent on May 15, 2003. The Act implemented the recommendations of the Final Report of the Electoral Boundaries Commission, chaired by former Social Credit MLA and Alberta's Ethics Commissioner Robert Curtis Clark which delineated the new electoral boundaries for the upcoming 2004 Alberta general election and the 26th Alberta Legislature. The new electoral boundaries retained a total of 83 seats, with Calgary gaining two seats, Edmonton losing one seat, and one of the "special consideration" divisions (due to its isolation, it is allowed to have a population below 75% of the provincial average) was eliminated, leaving Dunvegan-Central Peace the last remaining special consideration district.

== Members of the 25th Legislature by district ==
District	Member	Party	First elected/ previously elected	No.# of term(s)	Notes
Athabasca-Wabasca	Mike Cardinal	Progressive Conservative	1989	4th term	
Airdrie-Rocky View	Carol Haley	Progressive Conservative	1993	3rd term	
Banff-Cochrane	Janis Tarchuk	Progressive Conservative	1997	2nd term	
Barrhead-Westlock	Ken Kowalski	Progressive Conservative	1979	7th term	
Bonnyville-Cold Lake	Denis Ducharme	Progressive Conservative	1997	2nd term	
Calgary-Bow	Alana DeLong	Progressive Conservative	2001	1st term	
Calgary-Buffalo	Harvey Cenaiko	Progressive Conservative	2001	1st term	
Calgary-Cross	Yvonne Fritz	Progressive Conservative	1993	3rd term	
Calgary Currie	Jon Lord	Progressive Conservative	2001	1st term	
Calgary-East	Moe Amery	Progressive Conservative	1993	3rd term	
Calgary-Egmont	Denis Herard	Progressive Conservative	1993	3rd term	
Calgary Elbow	Ralph Klein	Progressive Conservative	1989	4th term	
Calgary Fish Creek	Heather Forsyth	Progressive Conservative	1993	3rd term	
Calgary-Foothills	Pat Nelson	Progressive Conservative	1989	4th term	
Calgary-Fort	Wayne Cao	Progressive Conservative	1997	2nd term	
Calgary-Glenmore	Ron Stevens	Progressive Conservative	1997	2nd term	
Calgary Lougheed	Marlene Graham	Progressive Conservative	1997	2nd term	
Calgary McCall	Shiraz Shariff	Progressive Conservative	1995	3rd term	
Calgary Montrose	Hung Pham	Progressive Conservative	1993	3rd term	
Calgary-Mountain View	Mark Hlady	Progressive Conservative	1993	3rd term	
Calgary-North Hill	Richard Magnus	Progressive Conservative	1993	3rd term	
Calgary North West	Greg Melchin	Progressive Conservative	1997	2nd term	
Calgary Nose Creek	Gary Mar	Progressive Conservative	1993	3rd term	
Calgary Shaw	Cindy Ady	Progressive Conservative	2001	1st term	
Calgary-Varsity	Murray Smith	Progressive Conservative	1993	3rd term	
Calgary West	Karen Kryczka	Progressive Conservative	1997	2nd term	
Cardston-Taber-Warner	Broyce Jacobs	Progressive Conservative	2001	1st term	
Clover Bar-Fort Saskatchewan	Rob Lougheed	Progressive Conservative	1997	2nd term	
Cypress-Medicine Hat	Lorne Taylor	Progressive Conservative	1993	3rd term	
Drayton Valley-Calmar	Tony Abbott	Progressive Conservative	2001	1st term	
Drumheller-Chinook	Shirley McClellan	Progressive Conservative	1987	5th term	
Dunvegan	Hector Goudreau	Progressive Conservative	2001	1st term	
Edmonton-Beverly-Clareview	Julius Yankowsky	Progressive Conservative	1993 (Note: First elected as a Liberal)	3rd term	
Edmonton-Calder	Brent Rathgeber	Progressive Conservative	2001	1st term	
Edmonton Castle Downs	Thomas Lukaszuk	Progressive Conservative	2001	1st term	
Edmonton Centre	Laurie Blakeman	Liberal	1997	2nd term	
Edmonton Ellerslie	Debby Carlson	Liberal	1993	3rd term	Resigned
Edmonton Ellerslie	Vacant at dissolution				
Edmonton-Glengarry	Bill Bonner	Liberal	1997	2nd term	
Edmonton-Glenora	Drew Hutton	Progressive Conservative	2001	1st term	
Edmonton-Gold Bar	Hugh MacDonald	Liberal	1997	2nd term	
Edmonton-Highlands	Brian Mason	NDP	2000	2nd term	
Edmonton Manning	Tony Vandermeer	Progressive Conservative	2001	1st term	
Edmonton-McClung	Mark Norris	Progressive Conservative	2001	1st term	
Edmonton Meadowlark	Bob Maskell	Progressive Conservative	2001	1st term	
Edmonton Mill Creek	Gene Zwozdesky	Progressive Conservative	1993	3rd term	
Edmonton-Mill Woods	Don Massey	Liberal	1993	3rd term	
Edmonton-Norwood	Gary Masyk	Progressive Conservative	2001	1st term	Crossed the floor
Edmonton-Norwood	Gary Masyk	Alberta Alliance	2001	1st term	Crossed the floor
Edmonton Riverview	Kevin Taft	Liberal	2001	1st term	
Edmonton Rutherford	Ian McClelland	Progressive Conservative	2001	1st term	
Edmonton-Strathcona	Raj Pannu	NDP	1997	2nd term	
Edmonton-Whitemud	David Hancock	Progressive Conservative	1997	2nd term	
Fort McMurray	Guy Boutilier	Progressive Conservative	1997	2nd term	
Grande Prairie-Smoky	Mel Knight	Progressive Conservative	2001	1st term	
Grande Prairie-Wapiti	Gordon Graydon	Progressive Conservative	2001	1st term	
Highwood	Don Tannas	Progressive Conservative	1989	4th term	
Innisfail-Sylvan Lake	Luke Ouellette	Progressive Conservative	2001	1st term	
Lac La Biche-St. Paul	Ray Danyluk	Progressive Conservative	2001	1st term	
Lacombe-Stettler	Judy Gordon	Progressive Conservative	1993	3rd term	
Lesser Slave Lake	Pearl Calahasen	Progressive Conservative	1989	4th term	
Leduc	Albert Klapstein	Progressive Conservative	1997	2nd term	
Lethbridge-East	Ken Nicol	Liberal	1993	3rd term	Resigned
Lethbridge-East	Vacant at dissolution				
Lethbridge-West	Clint Dunford	Progressive Conservative	1993	3rd term	
Little Bow	Barry McFarland	Progressive Conservative	1992	4th term	
Livingstone-Macleod	David Coutts	Progressive Conservative	1993	3rd term	
Medicine Hat	Rob Renner	Progressive Conservative	1993	3rd term	
Olds-Didsbury-Three Hills	Richard Marz	Progressive Conservative	1997	2nd term	
Peace River	Gary Friedel	Progressive Conservative	1993	3rd term	
Ponoka-Rimbey	Halvar Jonson	Progressive Conservative	1982	6th term	
Red Deer North	Mary Anne Jablonski	Progressive Conservative	2000	2nd term	
Red Deer South	Victor Doerksen	Progressive Conservative	1993	3rd term	
Redwater	Dave Broda	Progressive Conservative	1997	2nd term	
Rocky Mountain House	Ty Lund	Progressive Conservative	1989	4th term	
Sherwood Park	Iris Evans	Progressive Conservative	1997	2nd term	
St. Albert	Mary O'Neill	Progressive Conservative	1997	2nd term	
Spruce Grove-Sturgeon-St. Albert	Doug Horner	Progressive Conservative	2001	1st term	
Stony Plain	Stan Woloshyn	Progressive Conservative	1989 (Note: First elected as a NDP)	4th term	
Strathmore-Brooks	Lyle Oberg	Progressive Conservative	1993	3rd term	
Vegreville-Viking	Ed Stelmach	Progressive Conservative	1993	3rd term	
Vermilion-Lloydminster	Lloyd Snelgrove	Progressive Conservative	2001	1st term	
Wainwright	Robert Fischer	Progressive Conservative	1982	6th term	Resigned
Wainwright	Doug Griffiths (2002)	Progressive Conservative	2002	1st term	Elected by-election
West Yellowhead	Ivan Strang	Progressive Conservative	1997	2nd term	
Wetaskiwin-Camrose	LeRoy Johnson	Progressive Conservative	1997	2nd term	
Whitecourt-Ste. Anne	George VanderBurg	Progressive Conservative	2001	1st term	

== Standings changes during the 25th Assembly ==
Number of members per party by date	2001		2002	2004		
Number of members per party by date	Mar 12	Dec 31	Apr 8	May 25	May 28	Jun 29
Progressive Conservative	74	73	74			73
Liberal	7			6	5	
New Democratic	2					
Alberta Alliance	0					1
Total members	83	82	83	82	81	
Vacant	0	1	0	1	2	
Government Majority	65	64	65	66	67	65

1. December 31, 2001 Robert Fischer, Wainwright resigns
2. April 8, 2002 Doug Griffiths, Wainwright elected in a by-election
3. May 25, 2004 Ken Nicol, Lethbridge-East resigns to run in a federal election
4. May 28, 2004 Debby Carlson, Edmonton Ellerslie resigned to run in a federal election
5. June 29, 2004 Gary Masyk, Edmonton Norwood crossed the floor to the Alberta Alliance
