= 2001 Alberta general election =

← 1997	March 12, 2001	2004 →

83 seats in the Legislative Assembly of Alberta 42 seats needed for a majority
- Turnout: 53.38%
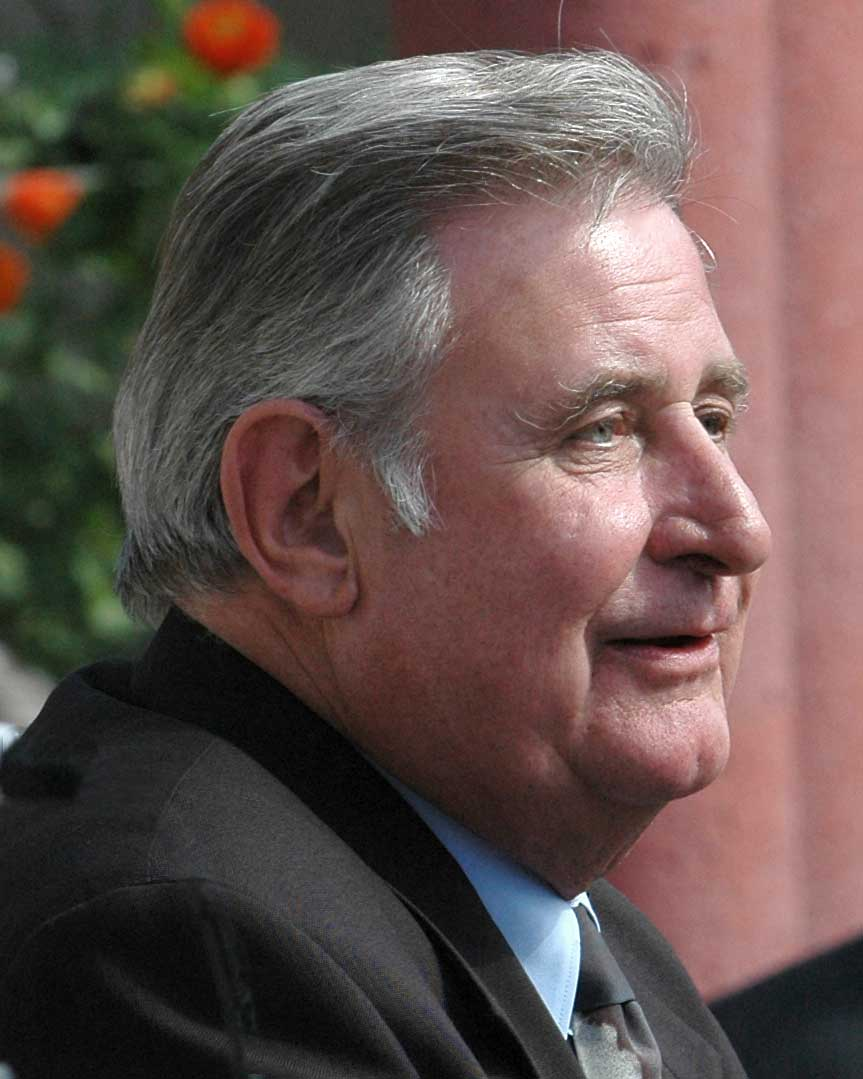

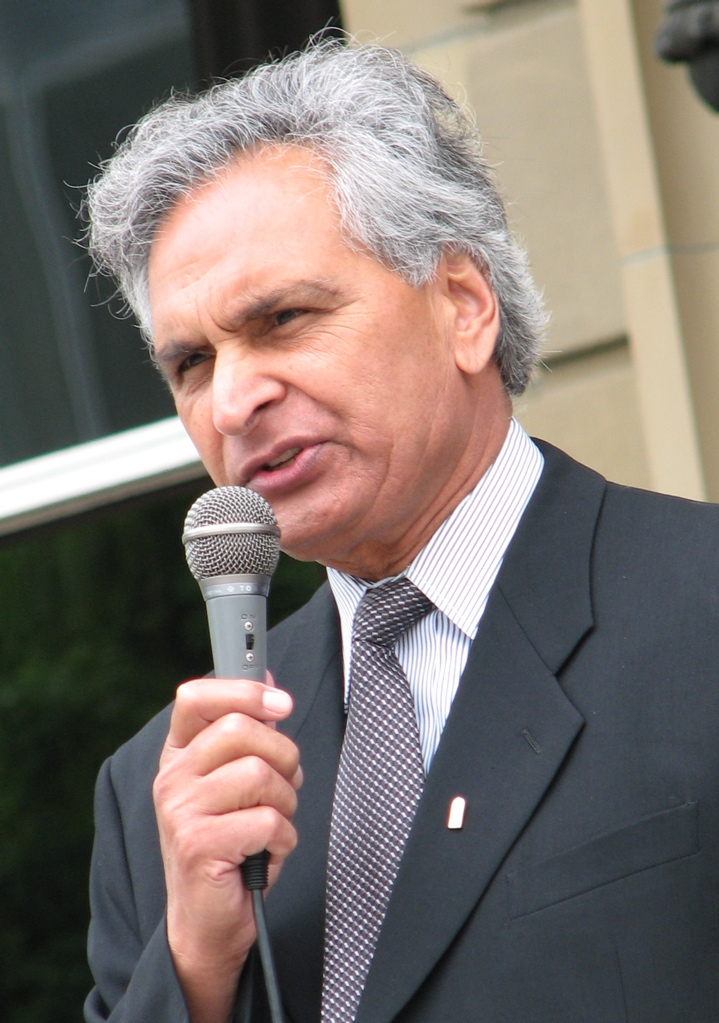
	Majority party	Minority party	Third party
		LIB
Leader	Ralph Klein	Nancy MacBeth	Raj Pannu
Party	Progressive Conservative	Liberal	New Democratic
Leader since	December 14, 1992	April 18, 1998	November 5, 2000
Leader's seat	Calgary-Elbow	Edmonton-McClung (lost re-election)	Edmonton-Strathcona
Last election	63 seats, 51.2%	18 seats, 32.8%	2 seats, 8.8%
Seats before	64	15	2
Seats won	74	7	2
Seat change	▲10	▼8	±0
Popular vote	627,252	276,854	81,339
Percentage	61.9%	27.3%	8.0%
Swing	▲10.7%	▼5.5%	▼0.8%
Premier before election
Ralph Klein
Progressive Conservative
Premier after election
Ralph Klein
Progressive Conservative

The 2001 Alberta general election was held on March 12, 2001 to elect members of the Legislative Assembly of Alberta.

The incumbent Alberta Progressive Conservative Party, led by Ralph Klein, won a strong majority for its tenth consecutive term in government. In addition to increasing its share of the popular vote to almost 62%, the PC Party won a majority of seats in Edmonton for the first time since 1982. In the process, they reduced the opposition to only nine MLAs in total. It was the Tories' biggest majority since the height of the Peter Lougheed era.

The Liberal Party lost 11 seats and ran up a large debt. Its leader, Nancy MacBeth, was defeated in her riding.

The New Democratic Party, led by Raj Pannu, hoped to make gains at the expense of the Liberals in Edmonton and replace them as the official opposition. This did not materialize, but the party did manage to maintain its share of the popular vote and held onto their two seats in the legislature. The NDP attempted to attract young voters with the slogan, "Raj against the Machine".

The right-wing Alberta First Party, contesting its first election, failed to win any seats or come close to winning any. The Social Credit Party, led by James Albers, was unable to build on its moderate success in the 1997 election, and sank back into obscurity. Socred leader Lavern Ahlstrom, however, performed well in Rocky Mountain House and finished second behind the incumbent Ty Lund.

== Opinion polls ==
Evolution of voting intentions at provincial level
Polling firm	Last day of survey	Source	PCA	ALP	ANDP	Other	ME	Sample
Election 2001	March 12, 2001		61.9	27.3	8.0			
Pollara	December 1997		57	—	—	—	—	—
Election 1997	March 11, 1997		51.17	32.75	8.81			

== Results ==
Overall voter turnout was 53.38%.

Party		Party leader	# of candidates	Seats			Popular vote			
Party		Party leader	# of candidates	1997	Dissolution	Elected	% Change	#	%	% Change
Progressive Conservative		Ralph Klein	83	63	64	74	+17.5%	627,252	61.91%	+10.74%
Liberal		Nancy MacBeth	83	18	15	7	-61.1%	276,854	27.33%	-5.42%
New Democrats		Raj Pannu	83	2	2	2	-	81,339	8.03%	-0.78%
Independent			29	-	1	-	-	10,528	1.04%	+0.93%
Alberta First		John Reil	16	*	-	-	*	8,851	0.87%	*
Social Credit	Coalition	James Albers	12	-	-	-	-	5,361	0.53%	-6.31%
Alberta Party	Coalition	Fred Schorning	12	-	-	-	-	5,361	0.53%	-6.31%
Green		David Parker	10	-	-	-	-	2,850	0.28%	+0.17%
Communist		Naomi Rankin	2	-	-	-	-	117	0.01%	x
Vacant				*	1					
Total			318	83	83	83	-	1,013,152	100%	

Notes:

* Party did not nominate candidates in the previous election.

x - less than 0.005% of the popular vote.

Popular vote
PC	61.91%
Liberal	27.33%
New Democratic	8.03%
Others	2.73%

Seats summary
PC	89.16%
Liberal	8.43%
New Democratic	2.41%

== Results by riding ==
Electoral district	Candidates				Incumbent
Electoral district	PC	Liberal	NDP	Other	Incumbent
Airdrie-Rocky View	Carol Louise Haley; 13,195; 79.79%	Carol L'Abbee; 2,043; 12.35%	Christopher Hill; 592; 3.58%	Tom Humble (Ind.); 683; 4.13%	Carol Louise Haley
Athabasca-Wabasca	Mike Cardinal; 4,238; 66.62%	Al Wurfel; 1,264; 19.87%	Colin Piquette; 606; 9.53%	David Klassen (SoCred); 153; 2.41% Ian Hopfe (Green); 94; 1.48%	Mike Cardinal
Banff-Cochrane	Janis Tarchuk; 9,418; 69.94%	Norman Kent; 2,147; 15.95%	Cathy Harrop; 1,311; 9.74%	Cory Morgan (Ind.); 538; 4.00%	Janis Tarchuk
Barrhead-Westlock	Kenneth R. Kowalski; 7,183; 69.06%	Laurie Hodge; 1,259; 12.10%	Suzanne Forbes; 569; 5.47%	Jeff Willerton (SoCred); 1352; 13.00%	Kenneth R. Kowalski
Bonnyville-Cold Lake	Denis Ducharme; 5,641; 70.37%	Ronald Young; 1,755; 21.89%	Ellen Ulfsten; 313; 3.90%	James William Skretteberg (Ind.); 275; 3.43%	Denis Ducharme
Calgary-Bow	Alana S. DeLong; 8,274; 63.82%	Kelly McDonnell; 3,230; 24.91%	Jeff Bayliss; 858; 6.62%	Margaret (Peggy) Askin (Ind.); 184; 1.42% Jan Triska (Green); 394	Bonnie Laing
Calgary-Buffalo	Harvey Cenaiko; 5,582; 53.92%	Brian Edy; 4,135; 39.94%	Neil McKinnon; 473; 4.57%	Dave Schwartz (SoCred); 113; 1.09%	Gary Dickson
Calgary-Cross	Yvonne Fritz; 6,816; 74.67%	Keith Jones; 1,836; 20.11%	Ramiro Mora; 441; 4.83%		Yvonne Fritz
Calgary-Currie	Jon Lord; 6,922; 61.75%	Pat Murray; 2,667; 23.79%	Garth Mundle; 1,114; 9.94%	J. Bruce Miller (Ind.); 434; 3.87%	Jocelyn Burgener
Calgary-East	Moe Amery; 6,038; 70.32%	Brendan Dunphy; 2,010; 23.41%	Giorgio Cattabeni; 328; 3.82%	Alan Schoonover (Ind.); 109; 1.27% Jason Devine (Comm.); 41	Moe Amery
Calgary-Egmont	Denis Herard; 10,338; 74.08%	Wayne Lenhardt; 2,613; 18.72%	Shawn Christie; 567; 4.06%	Bradley R. Lang (Ind.); 399; 2.86%	Denis Herard
Calgary-Elbow	Ralph Klein; 10,213; 66.68%	Harold Swanson; 4,533; 29.59%	Mathew Zachariah; 369; 2.41%	Monier Rahall (Ind.); 166; 1.08%	Ralph Klein
Calgary-Fish Creek	Heather Forsyth; 9,716; 74.39%	Marc Doll; 2,853; 21.84%	Ryan Todd; 465; 3.56%		Heather Forsyth
Calgary-Foothills	Pat Nelson; 12,070; 67.21%	Harry B. Chase; 5,051; 28.13%	Jon Adams; 784; 4.37%		Patricia Black
Calgary-Fort	Wayne Cao; 6,740; 68.29%	Brian Huskins; 2,004; 20.30%	Vinay Dey; 501; 5.08%	Raymond (Chick) Hurst (SoCred); 160; 1.62% Michael Alvarez-Toye (Green); 121; 1.23% Metro Peter Demchynski (Ind.); 102; 1.04% Brian Slater (Ind.); 100; 1.02% Wyatt McIntyre (Ab. First); 99; 1.00%	Wayne Cao
Calgary-Glenmore	Ron Stevens; 9,678; 67.51%	Michael Broadhurst; 3,708; 25.86%	Jennifer Stewart; 441; 3.08%	James S. Kohut (Green); 467; 3.27%	Ron Stevens
Calgary-Lougheed	Marlene Graham; 8,952; 73.95%	Pete Montgomery; 2,538; 20.97%	Marc Power; 577; 4.77%		Marlene Graham
Calgary-McCall	Shiraz Shariff; 6,558; 69.94%	John Phillips; 2,082; 22.20%	Preet Sihota; 449; 4.79%	Darryl Elvers (Ab. First); 139; 1.48% Rory M. Cory (SoCred); 121; 1.29%	Shiraz Shariff
Calgary-Montrose	Hung Pham; 6,329; 70.35%	Art Danielson; 2,093; 23.27%	Robert Scobel; 543; 6.04%		Hung Pham
Calgary-Mountain View	Mark Hlady; 6,462; 60.23%	Jennifer Spencer; 2,610; 24.33%	Keith Purdy; 1,637; 15.26%		Mark Hlady
Calgary-North Hill	Richard Charles Magnus; 7,034; 63.60%	Darryl G. Hawkins; 2,529; 22.87%	Christine McGregor; 1,067; 9.65%	Darcy Kraus (Ab. First); 404; 3.65%	Richard Charles Magnus
Calgary-North West	Greg Melchin; 15,292; 71.38%	Paul Allard; 4,971; 23.21%	Patricia Alward; 828; 3.87%	Douglas A. Picken (SoCred); 299; 1.40%	Greg Melchin
Calgary-Nose Creek	Gary Mar; 11,997; 74.58%	Peter Willott; 3,263; 20.28%	Eileen Nesbitt; 776; 4.82%		Gary Mar
Calgary-Shaw	Cindy Ady; 20,306; 80.60%	Jim McPherson; 3,595; 14.27%	Ryan Falkenberg; 729; 2.89%	Peter Singleton (Ab. First); 222; 0.88% Kevin Agar (Ind.); 153>br/>0.61% Darren Popik (Ind.); 151; 0.60%	Jonathan Niles Havelock
Calgary-Varsity	Murray D. Smith; 8,173; 59.14%	Carrol Jaques; 3,938; 28.49%	Susan Scott; 1,309; 9.47%	Tavis Du Preez (Green)<by/>334; 2.90%	Murray D. Smith
Calgary-West	Karen Kryczka; 12,866; 72.92%	Lorne B. Neudorf; 3,459; 19.60%	Greg Klassen; 1,263; 7.16%		Karen Kryczka
Cardston-Taber-Warner	Broyce G. Jacobs; 5,256; 53.58%	Ron Hancock; 1,747; 17.81%	Suzanne Sirias; 240; 2.45%	John Reil (Ab. First); 2557; 26.07%	Ron Hierath
Clover Bar-Fort Saskatchewan	Rob Lougheed; 9,674; 62.59%	W.H. (Skip) Gordon; 4,606; 29.80%	Merrill Stewart; 1,142; 7.39%		Rob Lougheed
Cypress-Medicine Hat	Lorne Taylor; 7,222; 72.71%	Beverley Britton Clarke; 2,074; 20.88%	Cliff Anten; 598; 6.02%		Lorne Taylor
Drayton Valley-Calmar	Tony Abbott; 7,673; 68.29%	Roger Coles; 2,229; 19.84%	Mark Patty; 588; 5.23%	Roger Stefura (Ind.); 729; 6.49%	Tom Thurber
Drumheller-Chinook	Shirley McClellan; 6,684; 72.77%	Greg Pyra; 0,921; 10.03%	Gerry Hamilton; 546; 5.94%	Eileen Walker (Ind.); 819; 8.92% Peter Smits (SoCred); 184; 2.00%	Shirley McClellan
Dunvegan	Hector G. Goudreau; 5,857; 67.02%	Bruce Rutley; 1,888; 21.60%	Yvonne Sinkevich; 508; 5.81%	Ron (Earl) Miller (Ind.); 248; 2.85% Fred Euler (Ind.); 208; 2.39%	Glen Clegg
Edmonton-Beverly-Clareview	Julius E. Yankowsky; 4,732; 45.61%	Bauni Mackay; 3,290; 31.71%	Elisabeth Ballermann; 1,985; 19.13%	Ken Shipka (Ind.)>br/>211; 2.04% Teo Zanetic (Ab. First); 92; 0.89% Tanya Gill (Ind.); 56; 0.54%	Julius E. Yankowsky
Edmonton-Calder	Brent Rathgeber; 5,128; 41.90%	Lance D. White; 4,654; 38.03%	Christine Burdett; 2,432; 19.87%		Lance D. White
Edmonton-Castle Downs	Thomas A. Lukaszuk; 5,971; 51.03%	Boris Yaremko; 4,479; 38.28%	Michael Charrois; 1,235; 10.56%		Pamela Paul
Edmonton-Centre	Don J. Weideman; 4,446; 38.16%	Laurie Blakeman; 5,095; 43.73%	David Eggen; 1,959; 16.82%	Naomi J. Rankin (Comm.); 76; 0.66%	Laurie Blakeman
Edmonton-Ellerslie	Sukhi Randhawa; 4,209; 41.95%	Debby Carlson; 4,481; 44.66%	Deborah Morrison; 1,299; 12.95%		Debby Carlson
Edmonton-Glengarry	Andrew Beniuk; 4,715; 44.85%	Bill Bonner; 4,784; 45.51%	Shane Watt; 1,004; 9.55%		Bill Bonner
Edmonton-Glenora	Drew Hutton; 5,515; 45.57%	Howard Sapers; 5,328; 44.03%	Guy Desrosiers; 1,232; 10.18%		Howard Sapers
Edmonton-Gold Bar	David Fletcher; 5,981; 39.85%	Hugh MacDonald; 7,654; 51.00%	Peter Cross; 1,159; 7.72%	Margaret Marean (Green); 193; 1.29%	Hugh MacDonald
Edmonton-Highlands	Robert Bilida; 3,477; 34.51%	Kim Cassady; 1,921; 19.07%	Brian Mason; 4,641; 46.07%		Brian Mason
Edmonton-Manning	Tony Vandermeer; 5,903; 45.44%	Ed Gibbons; 5,523; 42.51%	Hana Razga; 1,538; 11.84%		Ed Gibbons
Edmonton-McClung	Mark P. Norris; 6,976; 50.41%	Nancy J. MacBeth; 5,920; 42.78%	Lorne Dach; 804; 5.81%	Patrick D. Ellis (Ind.); 133; 0.96%	Nancy J. MacBeth
Edmonton-Meadowlark	Bob Maskell; 6,108; 48.50%	Karen Leibovici; 5,674; 45.06%	Mike Hudema; 636; 5.05%	Peggy Morton (Ind.); 144; 1.14%	Karen Leibovici
Edmonton-Mill Creek	Gene Zwozdesky; 8,085; 55.51%	Bharat Agnihotri; 4,229; 29.04%	Edwin Villania; 1,893; 13.00%	Kyle Harvey (Ab. First); 220; 1.51% Harlan Light (Green); 97; 0.67%	Gene Zwozdesky
Edmonton-Mill Woods	Carl Benito; 4,402; 43.69%	Don Massey; 4,920; 48.83%	Mel H. Buffalo; 725; 7.20%		Don Massey
Edmonton-Norwood	Gary Masyk; 3,304; 38.06%	Brian Bechtel; 3,164; 36.45%	Harvey Voogd; 2,196; 25.30%		Sue Olsen
Edmonton-Riverview	Wendy Kinsella; 5,883; 39.29%	Kevin Taft; 7,420; 49.55%	Doug McLachlan; 1,469; 9.81%	Jerry Paschen (Green); 165; 1.10%	Linda Sloan
Edmonton-Rutherford	Ian McClelland; 6,173; 48.08%	Rick Miller; 5,558; 43.29%	Shane MacDonald; 1,071; 8.34%		Percy Wickman
Edmonton-Strathcona	John Logan; 4,749; 34.27%	Jim Jacuta; 1,944; 14.03%	Raj Pannu; 6,998; 50.50%	James Lakinn (Ab. First); 136; 0.98%	Raj Pannu
Edmonton-Whitemud	David Hancock; 10,884; 58.45%	Bruce King; 6,503; 34.92%	Katie Oppen Benschop; 1,178; 6.33%		David Hancock
Fort McMurray	Guy C. Boutilier; 5,914; 64.36%	John S. Vyboh; 1,759; 19.14%	Lyn Gorman; 1,498; 16.30%		Guy C. Boutilier
Grande Prairie-Smoky	Mel Knight; 6,241; 67.51%	Barry Robinson; 1,777; 19.22%	Leon R. Pendleton; 842; 9.11%	Dennis Young (Ind.); 380; 4.11%	Walter Paszkowski
Grande Prairie-Wapiti	Gordon J. Graydon; 5,674; 65.40%	Ray Stitsen; 1,489; 17.16%	Elroy Deimert; 819; 9.44%	Ivo Noga (SoCred); 432; 4.98% Terry Dueck (Ind.); 136; Robert Weberg (Ind.); 112; 1.29%	Wayne Jacques
Highwood	Don Tannas; 13,321; 79.71%	Leonard Borowski; 2,000; 11.97%	Gunhild Hoogensen; 773; 4.63%	Julie Walker (Green); 581; 3.48%	Don Tannas
Innisfail-Sylvan Lake	Luke Ouellette; 9,725; 74.40%	Garth E. Davis; 2,652; 20.29%	Eileen Clancy Teslenko; 651; 4.98%		Gary Severtson
Lac La Biche-St. Paul	Ray Danyluk; 5,335; 59.92%	Vital Ouellette; 3,195; 35.88%	John Williams; 356; 4.00%		Paul Langevin
Lacombe-Stettler	Judy Gordon; 8,221; 70.00%	Doug McDavid; 2,500; 21.29%	Lorenzo Fiorito; 455; 3.87%	Douglas R. Chitwood (Ind.); 554; 4.72%	Judy Gordon
Leduc	Albert Klapstein; 9,235; 66.69%	Joyce Assen; 3,575; 25.82%	Leilani O'Malley; 957; 6.91%		Albert Klapstein
Lesser Slave Lake	Pearl M. Calahasen; 4,766; 73.80%	Rick Noel; 1,429; 22.13%	Doris Bannister; 232; 3.59%		Pearl M. Calahasen
Lethbridge-East	Ron Carroll; 4,704; 36.87%	Ken Nicol; 6,939; 54.39%	Gaye Metz; 542; 4.25%	Mark Ogden (Ab. First); 554; 4.34%	Ken Nicol
Lethbridge-West	Clint Dunford; 6,685; 47.97%	Leslie Vaala; 5,496; 39.43%	Mark Sandilands; 1,062; 7.62%	Brian Stewart (Ab. First); 662; 4.75%	Clint Dunford
Little Bow	Barry McFarland; 6,881; 64.70%	Arij Langstraat; 2,534; 23.82%	Andrea Enes; 319; 3.00%	Jon Koch (Ind.); 885; 8.32%	Barry McFarland
Livingstone-Macleod	David Coutts; 6,340; 60.47%	Ernie Patterson; 3,035; 28.95%	James Tweedie; 553; 5.27%	Larry Lybbert (Ab. First); 519; 4.95%	David Coutts
Medicine Hat	Rob Renner; 8,109; 61.80%	Karen Charlton; 4,166; 31.75%	Luke Lacasse; 787; 6.00%		Rob Renner
Olds-Didsbury-Three Hills	Richard Marz; 10,553; 80.51%	Gayleen Roelfsema; 1,663; 12.69%	Brenda L. Dyck; 383; 2.92%	Nicholas Semmler (SoCred); 460; 3.51%	Richard Marz
Peace River	Gary Friedel; 3,782; 64.29%	Susan Callihoo; 1,544; 26.25%	Steve Crocker; 338; 5.75%	John Iftody (Ab. First); 206; 3.50%	Gary Friedel
Ponoka-Rimbey	Halvar C. Jonson; 6,797; 71.87%	Tim Falkiner; 1,296; 13.70%	Linda Roth; 574; 6.07%	Charles Park (Ind.); 764; 8.08%	Halvar C. Jonson
Red Deer-North	Mary Anne Jablonski; 5,025; 57.04%	Norm McDougall; 3,110; 35.30%	Jim Guthrie; 309; 3.51%	Patti Argent (Ab. First); 356; 4.04%	Mary Anne Jablonski
Red Deer-South	Victor Doerksen; 7,684; 59.93%	Garfield Marks; 3,927; 30.63%	Erika Bullwinkle; 512; 3.99%	Bob Argent (Ab. First); 459; 3.58% Ryan Lamarche (Ind.); 203; 1.58%	Victor Doerksen
Redwater	Dave Broda; 7,319; 58.14%	Andrew Raczynski; 3,924; 31.17%	Mike Radojcic; 658; 5.23%	Tony Ollenberger (Ab. First); 647; 5.14%	Dave Broda
Rocky Mountain House	Ty Lund; 7,820; 70.27%	Wijnand Horemans; 1,171; 10.52%	Doug Mac Angus; 408; 3.67%	Lavern J. Ahlstrom (SoCred); 1705; 15.32%	Ty Lund
Sherwood Park	Iris Evans; 13,243; 64.03%	Louise Rogers; 5,787; 27.98%	Chris Harwood; 1,606; 7.76%		Iris Evans
Spruce Grove-Sturgeon-St. Albert	Doug Horner; 8,010; 55.23%	Colleen Soetaert; 5,832; 40.22%	Dale Apostal; 616; 4.25%		Colleen Soetaert
St. Albert	Mary O'Neill; 9,537; 52.50%	Len Bracko; 7,479; 41.17%	Michelle Mungall; 1,122; 6.18%		Mary O'Neill
Stony Plain	Stan Woloshyn; 9,197; 67.06%	Monika Cappis; 3,228; 23.54%	Stephen Lindop; 1,261; 9.19%		Stan Woloshyn
Strathmore-Brooks	Lyle Oberg; 8,585; 74.92%	Barry Morishita; 1,774; 15.48%	Don MacFarlane; 290; 2.53%	Christopher Sutherland (Ind.); 511; 4.46% Rudy Martens (SoCred); 273; 2.38%	Lyle Oberg
Vegreville-Viking	Ed Stelmach; 7,191; 60.63%	Ross Demkiw; 3,391; 28.59%	Greg Kurulok; 1,243; 10.48%		Ed Stelmach
Vermilion-Lloydminster	Lloyd Snelgrove; 6,978; 73.01%	David Tschorn; 0,980; 10.25%	Raymond Stone; 976; 10.21%	Grant West (Ab. First); 589; 6.16%	Steve West
Wainwright	Robert A. (Butch) Fischer; 6,910; 63.53%	Ronald Williams; 1,269; 11.67%	Lilas I. Lysne; 420; 3.86%	Jerry D. Barber (Ab. First); 1,394; 12.82% Jeff Newland (Ind.); 868; 7.98%	Robert A. (Butch) Fischer
West Yellowhead	Ivan J. Strang; 5,763; 59.10%	Lyle Benson; 3,180; 32.61%	Noel Lapierre; 801; 8.21%		Ivan J. Strang
Wetaskiwin-Camrose	LeRoy Johnson; 9,090; 72.25%	Stewart Larkin; 1,671; 13.28%	Philip Penrod; 1,420; 11.29%	Ben Lussier (Ind.); 382; 3.04%	LeRoy Johnson
Whitecourt-Ste. Anne	George VanderBurg; 7,579; 68.41%	Derril Butler; 2,890; 26.09%	Wade Franko; 570; 5.15%		Peter Trynchy
