= John Reil =

Canadian politician

The Honourable John Reil

Leader of The Alberta First Party
- In office 2000–2004
- Preceded by: Randy Thornstein

President of the Alberta Social Credit Party
- In office 1997–1999
- Succeeded by: Vacant

Founding-President of the Alberta First Party
- In office 1999–2000

John Reil (born 1949) is a former Canadian provincial politician, who served as leader of the Alberta First Party.

== Political career ==
Reil ran as a candidate for the Social Credit Party of Alberta in the 1997 Alberta general election. He ran in the electoral district of St. Albert and was defeated by Mary O'Neill who picked up the district for the Progressive Conservatives over incumbent Len Bracko. Reil had been serving as the Social Credit party President until he left in 1999 along with Leader Randy Thorsteinson and helped to found the Alberta First Party. This move came after the Socreds restricted involvement of Mormons in running the party.

Reil served as Alberta First's founding President until he was elected as the leader for the party at a convention held on January 22, 2000. In June of that year he contested a by-election held after Pam Barrett resigned after her near-death experience in the dentist chair. Reil managed to take 3% of the popular vote, but was soundly defeated by NDP candidate Brian Mason. Reil contested the 2001 Alberta general election in the electoral district of Cardston-Taber-Warner. He finished second with a respectable showing to Broyce Jacobs.

Reil left the Alberta First Party and ran for the leadership of the Alberta Liberal Party in 2004. He was defeated in a three-way race by Kevin Taft.
