= Edmonton-Glengarry =

Defunct provincial electoral district in Alberta, Canada

Coordinates: 53.596°N 113.479°W

Alberta electoral district

Defunct provincial electoral district
- Legislature: Legislative Assembly of Alberta
- District created: 1979
- District abolished: 2003
- First contested: 1979
- Last contested: 2001

Edmonton-Glengarry was a provincial electoral district in Alberta, Canada, mandated to return a single member to the Legislative Assembly of Alberta using the first past the post method of voting from 1979 to 2004.

== History ==
=== Members of the Legislative Assembly (MLAs) ===
Members of the Legislative Assembly for Edmonton-Glengarry
| Assembly | Years | Member | Party |
|---|---|---|---|
See St. Albert electoral district from 1905-1979, Edmonton-Belmont electoral district from 1971-1979 and Edmonton-Calder electoral district from 1971-1979
| 19th | 1979–1982 | Rollie Cook | Progressive Conservative |
| 20th | 1982–1986 | Rollie Cook | Progressive Conservative |
| 21st | 1986–1989 | John Younie | New Democratic |
| 21st | 1989–1993 | Laurence Decore | Liberal |
| 22nd | 1993–1997 | Laurence Decore | Liberal |
| 23rd | 1997–2001 | Bill Bonner | Liberal |
| 24th | 2001–2004 | Bill Bonner | Liberal |
See Edmonton-Decore electoral district from 2004-Present and Edmonton-Calder electoral district from 2004-2019

== Election results ==
=== 1979 ===
1979 Alberta general election
| Party | Candidate | Votes | % | ±% |
|---|---|---|---|---|
| Progressive Conservative | Rollie Cook | 4,309 | 55.29% | – |
| New Democratic | David Stewart | 1,489 | 19.10% | – |
| Social Credit | Victor Nakonechny | 1,277 | 16.38% | – |
| Liberal | Ron Hayter | 719 | 9.23% | – |
| Total | | 7,794 | – | – |
| Rejected, spoiled and declined | | N/A | – | – |
| Eligible electors / turnout | | 15,055 | 51.77% | – |
| Progressive Conservative pickup new district. | | | | |
Source(s) Source: "Edmonton-Glengarry Official Results 1979 Alberta general election". Alberta Heritage Community Foundation.

=== 1982 ===
1982 Alberta general election
| Party | Candidate | Votes | % | ±% |
|---|---|---|---|---|
| Progressive Conservative | Rollie Cook | 5,997 | 58.71% | 3.42% |
| New Democratic | Garth Stevenson | 3,181 | 31.14% | 12.04% |
| Western Canada Concept | Gordon Reid | 1,037 | 10.15% | – |
| Total | | 10,215 | – | – |
| Rejected, spoiled and declined | | 58 | – | – |
| Eligible electors / turnout | | 16,441 | 62.48% | – |
| Progressive Conservative hold | | Swing | | -4.31% |
Source(s) Source: "Edmonton-Glengarry Official Results 1982 Alberta general election". Alberta Heritage Community Foundation.

=== 1986 ===
1986 Alberta general election
| Party | Candidate | Votes | % | ±% |
|---|---|---|---|---|
| New Democratic | John Younie | 5,371 | 51.02% | 19.88% |
| Progressive Conservative | Ihor Broda | 3,720 | 35.33% | -23.37% |
| Liberal | Hugh W. Burgess | 1,191 | 11.31% | – |
| Representative | Lou Peterson | 147 | 1.40% | – |
| Western Canada Concept | Herb Lang | 99 | 0.94% | -9.21% |
| Total | | 10,528 | – | – |
| Rejected, spoiled and declined | | 22 | – | – |
| Eligible electors / turnout | | 23,650 | 44.61% | – |
| New Democratic gain from Progressive Conservative | | Swing | | -5.94% |
Source(s) Source: "Edmonton-Glengarry Official Results 1986 Alberta general election". Alberta Heritage Community Foundation.

=== 1989 ===
1989 Alberta general election
| Party | Candidate | Votes | % | ±% |
|---|---|---|---|---|
| Liberal | Laurence Decore | 7,401 | 48.81% | 37.49% |
| New Democratic | John Younie | 3,974 | 26.21% | -24.81% |
| Progressive Conservative | John Belzerowski | 3,759 | 24.79% | -10.55% |
| Communist | Robin Boodle | 30 | 0.20% | – |
| Total | | 15,164 | – | – |
| Rejected, spoiled and declined | | 41 | – | – |
| Eligible electors / turnout | | 25,246 | 60.23% | – |
| Liberal gain from New Democratic | | Swing | | 3.46% |
Source(s) Source: "Edmonton-Glengarry Official Results 1989 Alberta general election". Alberta Heritage Community Foundation.

=== 1993 ===
1993 Alberta general election
| Party | Candidate | Votes | % | ±% |
|---|---|---|---|---|
| Liberal | Laurence Decore | 7,548 | 66.08% | 17.27% |
| Progressive Conservative | Don Clarke | 2,669 | 23.37% | -1.42% |
| New Democratic | Greg Reimer | 1,088 | 9.52% | -16.68% |
| Natural Law | Linda Sikora | 118 | 1.03% | – |
| Total | | 11,423 | – | – |
| Rejected, spoiled, and declined | | 41 | – | – |
| Eligible electors / turnout | | 19,955 | 57.45% | – |
| Liberal hold | | Swing | | 10.06% |
Source(s) Source: "Edmonton-Glengarry Official Results 1993 Alberta general election". Alberta Heritage Community Foundation.

=== 1997 ===
1997 Alberta general election
| Party | Candidate | Votes | % | ±% |
|---|---|---|---|---|
| Liberal | Bill Bonner | 4,765 | 47.36% | -18.72% |
| Progressive Conservative | Don Clarke | 3,474 | 34.53% | 11.16% |
| New Democratic | William Kobluk | 1,366 | 13.58% | 4.05% |
| Social Credit | Barbie-Jo Williams | 335 | 3.33% | – |
| Natural Law | David Sharkey | 76 | 0.76% | -0.28% |
| Independent | Carl Williams | 46 | 0.46% | – |
| Total | | 10,062 | – | – |
| Rejected, spoiled and declined | | 43 | – | – |
| Eligible electors / turnout | | 19,506 | 51.80% | – |
| Liberal hold | | Swing | | -14.94% |
Source(s) Source: "Edmonton-Glengarry Official Results 1997 Alberta general election". Alberta Heritage Community Foundation.

=== 2001 ===
2001 Alberta general election
| Party | Candidate | Votes | % | ±% |
|---|---|---|---|---|
| Liberal | Bill Bonner | 4,784 | 45.55% | -1.81% |
| Progressive Conservative | Andrew Beniuk | 4,715 | 44.89% | 10.37% |
| New Democratic | Shane Watt | 1,004 | 9.56% | -4.02% |
| Total | | 10,503 | – | – |
| Rejected, spoiled, and declined | | 9 | – | – |
| Eligible electors / turnout | | 21,763 | 48.30% | – |
| Liberal hold | | Swing | | -6.09% |
Source(s) Source: "Edmonton-Glengarry Official Results 2001 Alberta general election". Alberta Heritage Community Foundation.

== See also ==
- List of Alberta provincial electoral districts
- Canadian provincial electoral districts
- Glengarry, a community in Edmonton
