= Drumheller-Chinook =

Defunct provincial electoral district in Alberta, Canada

Alberta electoral district

Defunct provincial electoral district
- Legislature: Legislative Assembly of Alberta
- District created: 1996
- District abolished: 2004
- First contested: 1997
- Last contested: 2001

Drumheller-Chinook was a provincial electoral district in Alberta, Canada, mandated to return a single member to the Legislative Assembly of Alberta using the first-past-the-post method of voting from 1997 to 2004.

== History ==
The electoral district was created in the 1996 boundary redistribution from the Drumheller and Chinook electoral districts. The electoral district would be combined with Lacombe-Stettler to form Drumheller-Stettler in 2003.

=== Members of the Legislative Assembly (MLAs) ===
Members of the Legislative Assembly for Drumheller-Chinook
Assembly	Years	Member	Party
See Drumheller electoral district from 1971-1997 and Chinook electoral district from 1979-1997
24th	1997–2001	Shirley McClellan	Progressive Conservative
25th	2001–2004	Shirley McClellan	Progressive Conservative
See Drumheller-Stettler electoral district from 2004-Present

== Electoral history ==
=== 1997 ===
1997 Alberta general election
Party	Candidate	Votes	%	±%
Progressive Conservative	Shirley McClellan	6,063	63.48%	–
Social Credit	Dale Trefz	2,056	21.53%	–
Liberal	Einar Davison	1,432	14.99%	–
Total		9,551	–	–
Rejected, spoiled and declined		30	–	–
Eligible electors / turnout		16,133	59.39%	–
Progressive Conservative pickup new district.				
Source(s) Source: "Drumheller-Chinook Official Results 1997 Alberta general election". Alberta Heritage Community Foundation.

=== 2001 ===
2001 Alberta general election
Party	Candidate	Votes	%	±%
Progressive Conservative	Shirley McClellan	6,684	73.02%	9.54%
Liberal	Greg Pyra	921	10.06%	-4.93%
Independent	Eileen Walker	819	8.95%	–
New Democratic	Gerry Hamilton	546	5.96%	–
Social Credit	Peter Smits	184	2.01%	-19.52%
Total		9,154	–	–
Rejected, spoiled, and declined		31	–	–
Eligible electors / turnout		16,066	57.17%	–
Progressive Conservative hold		Swing		10.50%
Source(s) Source: "Drumheller-Chinook Official Results 2001 Alberta general election". Alberta Heritage Community Foundation.

== See also ==
- List of Alberta provincial electoral districts
- Canadian provincial electoral districts
- Drumheller, Alberta, town in south-eastern Alberta
