= Jack Flaherty (politician) =

Canadian politician (1933–2025)

Member of the Legislative Assembly of Alberta for St. Albert
- In office November 22, 2004 – March 3, 2008
- Preceded by: Mary O'Neill
- Succeeded by: Ken Allred

Personal details
- Born: October 4, 1933 Edmonton, Alberta, Canada
- Died: September 24, 2025 (aged 91) Calgary, Alberta, Canada
- Party: Alberta Liberal Party
- Education: University of Alberta
- Occupation: Educator

John Kevin Flaherty (October 4, 1933 – September 24, 2025) was a Canadian politician who served as a member of the Legislative Assembly of Alberta.

== Biography ==
Born in Edmonton in 1933, Flaherty graduated with a Bachelor of Education, a Bachelor of Physical Education, and a Master's of Education from the University of Alberta. He worked as a teacher in Edmonton and Red Deer before becoming a consultant for the government's Department of Education. He later became an administrator, acting as associate superintendent of schools in Edmonton and the superintendent of schools in Fort McMurray.

Flaherty first ran for office in the 2004 Alberta provincial election, when he ran for the Alberta Liberal Party in St. Albert against incumbent Progressive Conservative Mary O'Neill. Flaherty won an upset victory of just over four hundred votes.

Once in office, Flaherty became the Liberal education critic, in which capacity he has argued that provincially mandated achievement tests should no longer be given to grade three students, and that the government should put increased focus on diagnostic testing of children at that age. He has also advocated for a broader range of programs for high school students and better support for vocational programs. In March 2007, he sponsored the School (Restrictions on Fees and Fundraising) Amendment Act (Bill 208), which would prohibit schools from charging fees or conducting fund-raising for the support of curricular activities. The bill was defeated in May 2007.

In September 2006, Flaherty announced that he would seek re-election during the next provincial election. However, he was defeated by the Progressive Conservative candidate, former city councillor Ken Allred. He died in Calgary on September 24, 2025, at the age of 91.
