= Lacombe-Stettler =

Defunct provincial electoral district in Alberta, Canada

Alberta electoral district

Defunct provincial electoral district
- Legislature: Legislative Assembly of Alberta
- District created: 1993
- District abolished: 2004
- First contested: 1993
- Last contested: 2001

Lacombe-Stettler was a provincial electoral district in Alberta, Canada, mandated to return a single member to the Legislative Assembly of Alberta using the first-past-the-post method of voting from 1993 to 2004.

== History ==
The Lacombe-Stettler electoral district was formed in 1993 combining portions of the Lacombe and Stettler electoral districts. The district is named after the city of Lacombe and the town of Stettler.

The Lacombe-Stettler electoral district was abolished following the 2003 electoral boundary re-distribution. The district was split with portions of the district were combined with portions of Ponoka-Rimbey to form Lacombe-Ponoka, and other portions combined with Drumheller-Chinook to form Drumheller-Stettler.

=== Members of the Legislative Assembly (MLAs) ===
Members of the Legislative Assembly for Lacombe-Stettler
| Assembly | Years | Member | Party |
|---|---|---|---|
See Lacombe electoral district from 1905-1993 and Stettler electoral district from 1909-1993
| 23rd | 1993–1997 | Judy Gordon | Progressive Conservative |
| 24th | 1997–2001 | Judy Gordon | Progressive Conservative |
| 25th | 2001–2004 | Judy Gordon | Progressive Conservative |
See Drumheller-Stettler electoral district from 2003-Present and Lacombe-Ponoka electoral district from 2003-Present

== Election results ==
=== 1993 ===
1993 Alberta general election
| Party | Candidate | Votes | % | ±% |
|---|---|---|---|---|
| Progressive Conservative | Judy Gordon | 6,596 | 57.80% | – |
| Liberal | Ed Whiteside | 3,001 | 26.30% | – |
| New Democratic | Rolf Pritchard | 730 | 6.40% | – |
| Social Credit | R. Ryan Handley | 687 | 6.02% | – |
| Independent | Doug Chitwood | 397 | 3.48% | – |
| Total | | 11,411 | – | – |
| Rejected, spoiled, and declined | | 19 | – | – |
| Eligible electors / turnout | | 18,398 | 62.13% | – |
| Progressive Conservative pickup new district. | | | | |
Source(s) Source: "Lacombe-Stettler Official Results 1993 Alberta general election". Alberta Heritage Community Foundation.

=== 1997 ===
1997 Alberta general election
| Party | Candidate | Votes | % | ±% |
|---|---|---|---|---|
| Progressive Conservative | Judy Gordon | 6,414 | 61.74% | 3.94% |
| Social Credit | Bob Argent | 1,725 | 16.61% | 10.59% |
| Liberal | Garfield Marks | 1,181 | 11.37% | -14.93% |
| New Democratic | Lynne Gendron | 1,068 | 10.28% | 3.88% |
| Total | | 10,388 | – | – |
| Rejected, spoiled and declined | | 21 | – | – |
| Eligible electors / turnout | | 19,153 | 54.35% | – |
| Progressive Conservative hold | | Swing | | 6.82% |
Source(s) Source: "Lacombe-Stettler Official Results 1997 Alberta general election". Alberta Heritage Community Foundation.

=== 2001 ===
2001 Alberta general election
| Party | Candidate | Votes | % | ±% |
|---|---|---|---|---|
| Progressive Conservative | Judy Gordon | 8,221 | 70.09% | 8.34% |
| Liberal | Doug McDavid | 2,500 | 21.31% | 9.94% |
| Independent | Douglas R. Chitwood | 554 | 4.72% | – |
| New Democratic | Lorenzo Fiorito | 455 | 3.88% | -6.40% |
| Total | | 11,730 | – | – |
| Rejected, spoiled and declined | | 15 | – | – |
| Eligible electors / turnout | | 21,103 | 55.66% | – |
| Progressive Conservative hold | | Swing | | 1.82% |
Source(s) Source: "Lacombe-Stettler Official Results 2001 Alberta general election". Alberta Heritage Community Foundation.

== See also ==
- List of Alberta provincial electoral districts
- Canadian provincial electoral districts
