= Edmonton-Norwood =

Defunct provincial electoral district in Alberta, Canada

Coordinates: 53.56°N 113.49°W

Alberta electoral district

Defunct provincial electoral district
- Legislature: Legislative Assembly of Alberta
- District created: 1959
- District abolished: 2004
- First contested: 1959
- Last contested: 2001

Edmonton-Norwood was a provincial electoral district in Alberta, Canada, mandated to return a single member to the Legislative Assembly of Alberta using the first past the post method of voting from 1959 to 2004.

== History ==
The Edmonton-Norwood electoral district was created from the Edmonton district in 1959 and was abolished in 2004 when it merged with Edmonton-Highlands to form Edmonton-Highlands-Norwood. The district was a swing riding and was held by every major party in Alberta. The district has seen a couple of floor crossings and was the only urban seat held by the Alberta Alliance Party.

In 2004, Gary Masyk ran a campaign to save the district from being abolished, and to reduce the effect of Edmonton losing seats to Calgary.

=== Members of the Legislative Assembly (MLAs) ===
Assembly	Years	Member	Party
See Edmonton 1921-1959
14th	1959-1963	William Tomyn	Social Credit
15th	1963-1967	William Tomyn	Social Credit
16th	1967-1971	William Tomyn	Social Credit
17th	1971-1975	Catherine Chichak	Progressive Conservative
18th	1975-1979	Catherine Chichak	Progressive Conservative
19th	1979-1982	Catherine Chichak	Progressive Conservative
20th	1982-1986	Ray Martin	NDP
21st	1986-1989	Ray Martin	NDP
22nd	1989-1993	Ray Martin	NDP
23rd	1993-1995	Andrew Beniuk	Liberal
23rd	1995-1996	Andrew Beniuk	Independent
23rd	1996-1997	Andrew Beniuk	Progressive Conservative
24th	1997-2000	Sue Olsen	Liberal
24th	2000-2001	Vacant	
25th	2001-2004	Gary Masyk	Progressive Conservative
25th	2004	Gary Masyk	Alberta Alliance
See Edmonton-Highlands-Norwood 2004-present

== Election results ==
=== 1959 ===
1959 Alberta general election
Party	Candidate	Votes	%	±%
Social Credit	William Tomyn	5,071	54.77%	–
Liberal	P. W. Bill Jones	1,522	16.44%	–
Progressive Conservative	Nestor Marchyshyn	1,482	16.01%	–
Co-operative Commonwealth	Frank G. McCoy	932	10.07%	–
Labor-Progressive	W. A. Tuomi	251	2.71%	–
Total		9,258	–	–
Rejected, spoiled and declined		48	–	–
Eligible electors / turnout		16,659	55.86%	–
Social Credit pickup new district.				
Source(s) Source: "Edmonton-Norwood Official Results 1959 Alberta general election". Alberta Heritage Community Foundation.

=== 1963 ===
1963 Alberta general election
Party	Candidate	Votes	%	±%
Social Credit	William Tomyn	3,905	47.94%	-6.84%
Liberal	J. Laurier Picard	1,628	19.99%	3.55%
New Democratic	Ronald W. Downey	1,330	16.33%	6.26%
Progressive Conservative	J. Gordon Ozarko	1,190	14.61%	-1.40%
Communist	Walter Makowecki	93	1.14%	–
Total		8,146	–	–
Rejected, spoiled and declined		14	–	–
Eligible electors / turnout		16,027	50.91%	-4.95%
Social Credit hold		Swing		-5.19%
Source(s) Source: "Edmonton-Norwood Official Results 1963 Alberta general election". Alberta Heritage Community Foundation.

=== 1967 ===
1967 Alberta general election
Party	Candidate	Votes	%	±%
Social Credit	William Tomyn	3,450	43.64%	-4.30%
New Democratic	Grant Notley	2,433	30.77%	14.44%
Progressive Conservative	Ronald W. Downey	2,023	25.59%	10.98%
Total		7,906	–	–
Rejected, spoiled and declined		116	–	–
Eligible electors / turnout		15,082	53.19%	2.28%
Social Credit hold		Swing		-7.54%
Source(s) Source: "Edmonton-Norwood Official Results 1967 Alberta general election". Alberta Heritage Community Foundation.

=== 1971 ===
1971 Alberta general election
Party	Candidate	Votes	%	±%
Progressive Conservative	Catherine Chichak	4,334	43.75%	18.16%
Social Credit	Irene Domecki	3,618	36.52%	-7.11%
New Democratic	Sam Lee	1,954	19.73%	-11.05%
Total		9,906	–	–
Rejected, spoiled and declined		199	–	–
Eligible electors / turnout		15,953	63.34%	10.15%
Progressive Conservative gain from Social Credit		Swing		-2.82%
Source(s) Source: "Edmonton-Norwood Official Results 1971 Alberta general election". Alberta Heritage Community Foundation.

=== 1975 ===
1975 Alberta general election
Party	Candidate	Votes	%	±%
Progressive Conservative	Catherine Chichak	4,298	59.36%	15.61%
New Democratic	Howard Rubin	1,849	25.54%	5.81%
Social Credit	Alfred Hooke	1,045	14.43%	-22.09%
Communist	Gary Hansen	48	0.66%	–
Total		7,240	–	–
Rejected, spoiled and declined		70	–	–
Eligible electors / turnout		15,619	46.80%	-16.54%
Progressive Conservative hold		Swing		13.30%
Source(s) Source: "Edmonton-Norwood Official Results 1975 Alberta general election". Alberta Heritage Community Foundation.

=== 1979 ===
1979 Alberta general election
Party	Candidate	Votes	%	±%
Progressive Conservative	Catherine Chichak	3,950	47.15%	-12.22%
New Democratic	Ray Martin	3,194	38.12%	12.58%
Social Credit	Mike Ekelund	703	8.39%	-6.04%
Liberal	Walter G. Coombs	486	5.80%	–
Communist	Kimball Cariou	45	0.54%	-0.13%
Total		8,378	–	–
Rejected, spoiled and declined		97	–	–
Eligible electors / turnout		16,231	52.21%	5.41%
Progressive Conservative hold		Swing		-12.40%
Source(s) Source: "Edmonton-Norwood Official Results 1979 Alberta general election". Alberta Heritage Community Foundation.

=== 1982 ===
1982 Alberta general election
Party	Candidate	Votes	%	±%
New Democratic	Ray Martin	4,857	46.22%	8.10%
Progressive Conservative	Tony Falcone	4,782	45.51%	-1.64%
Western Canada Concept	John Hudson	569	5.41%	–
Independent	Georg J.P. Wowk	263	2.50%	–
Communist	David Wallis	37	0.35%	-0.19%
Total		10,508	–	–
Rejected, spoiled and declined		59	–	–
Eligible electors / turnout		17,050	61.98%	9.85%
New Democratic gain from Progressive Conservative		Swing		-4.15%
Source(s) Source: "Edmonton-Norwood Official Results 1982 Alberta general election". Alberta Heritage Community Foundation.

=== 1986 ===
1986 Alberta general election
Party	Candidate	Votes	%	±%
New Democratic	Ray Martin	5,272	69.62%	23.39%
Progressive Conservative	Catherine Chichak	1,942	25.64%	-19.86%
Liberal	David R. Long	359	4.74%	–
Total		7,573	–	–
Rejected, spoiled and declined		26	–	–
Eligible electors / turnout		15,632	48.61%	-13.36%
New Democratic hold		Swing		21.63%
Source(s) Source: "Edmonton-Norwood Official Results 1986 Alberta general election". Alberta Heritage Community Foundation.

=== 1989 ===
1989 Alberta general election
Party	Candidate	Votes	%	±%
New Democratic	Ray Martin	4,229	57.60%	-12.02%
Liberal	Luis C. Baptista	1,594	21.71%	16.97%
Progressive Conservative	Dan Papirnik	1,519	20.69%	-4.95%
Total		7,342	–	–
Rejected, spoiled and declined		16	–	–
Eligible electors / turnout		15,068	48.83%	0.22%
New Democratic hold		Swing		-4.04%
Source(s) Source: "Edmonton-Norwood Official Results 1989 Alberta general election". Alberta Heritage Community Foundation.

=== 1993 ===
1993 Alberta general election
Party	Candidate	Votes	%	±%
Liberal	Andrew Beniuk	4,944	42.76%	21.05%
New Democratic	Ray Martin	3,749	32.43%	-25.17%
Progressive Conservative	Fay Orr	2,517	21.77%	1.08%
Social Credit	Alan Cruikshank	264	2.28%	–
Natural Law	Maury Shapka	88	0.76%	–
Total		11,562	–	–
Rejected, spoiled, and declined		49	–	–
Eligible electors / turnout		22,844	50.83%	2.00%
Liberal gain from New Democratic		Swing		-12.78%
Source(s) Source: "Edmonton-Norwood Official Results 1993 Alberta general election". Alberta Heritage Community Foundation.

=== 1997 ===
1997 Alberta general election
Party	Candidate	Votes	%	±%
Liberal	Sue Olsen	3,357	36.52%	-6.24%
New Democratic	Sherry McKibben	2,767	30.10%	-2.32%
Progressive Conservative	Andrew Beniuk	2,583	28.10%	6.33%
Social Credit	Ray Loyer	485	5.28%	2.99%
Total		9,192	–	–
Rejected, spoiled and declined		41	–	–
Eligible electors / turnout		18,068	51.10%	0.27%
Liberal hold		Swing		-1.96%
Source(s) Source: "Edmonton-Norwood Official Results 1997 Alberta general election". Alberta Heritage Community Foundation.

=== 2001 ===
2001 Alberta general election
Party	Candidate	Votes	%	±%
Progressive Conservative	Gary Masyk	3,304	38.13%	10.03%
Liberal	Brian Bechtel	3,164	36.52%	0.00%
New Democratic	Harvey Voogd	2,196	25.35%	-4.76%
Total		8,664	–	–
Rejected, spoiled and declined		16	–	–
Eligible electors / turnout		19,343	44.87%	-6.23%
Progressive Conservative gain from Liberal		Swing		-2.40%
Source(s) Source: "Edmonton-Norwood Official Results 2001 Alberta general election". Alberta Heritage Community Foundation.

== Floor crossings ==
1. Andrew Beniuk removed from the Liberal Caucus and sits as an independent June 23, 1995.
2. Andrew Beniuk joins the Progressive Conservative Caucus 1996
3. Gary Masyk crosses the floor to the Alberta Alliance Party June 29, 2004.

== See also ==
- List of Alberta provincial electoral districts
- Canadian provincial electoral districts
