= 1997 Alberta general election =

- March 11, 1997

83 seats in the Legislative Assembly of Alberta 42 seats needed for a majority
- Turnout: 53.75%
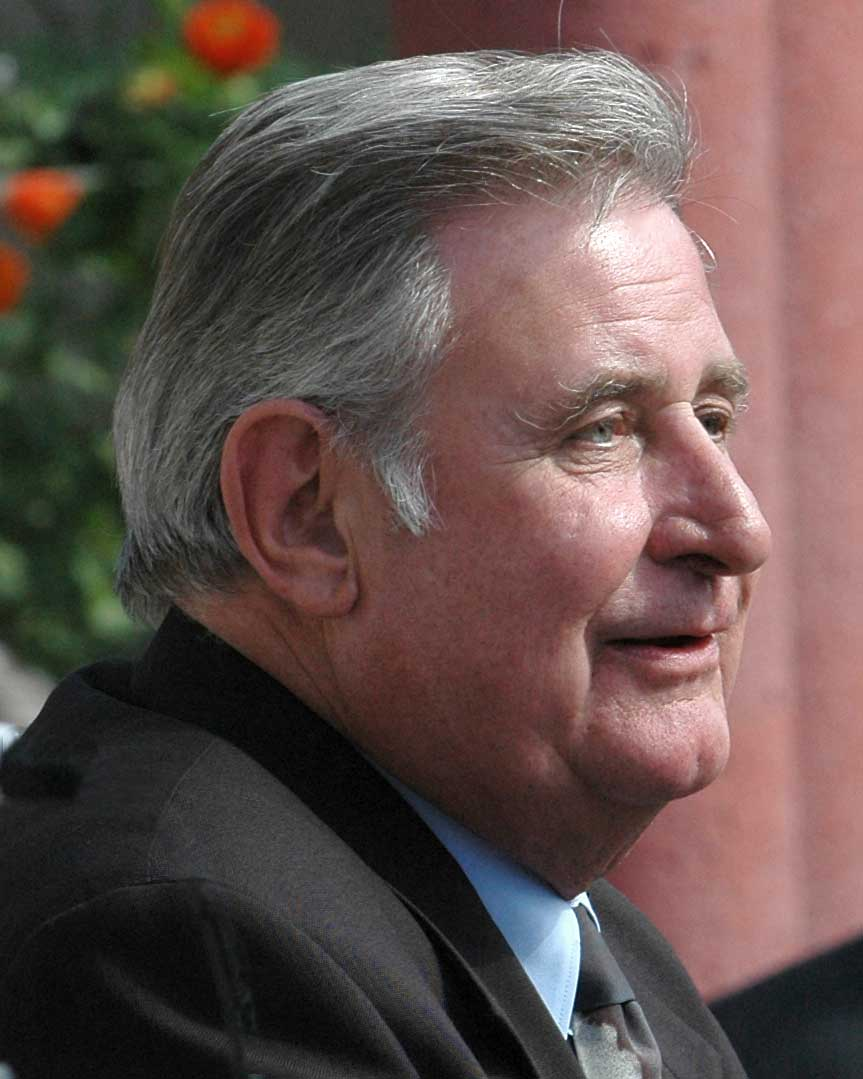
	Majority party	Minority party
		LIB
Leader	Ralph Klein	Grant Mitchell
Party	Progressive Conservative	Liberal
Leader since	December 14, 1992	November 13, 1994
Leader's seat	Calgary-Elbow	Edmonton-McClung
Last election	51 seats, 44.49%	32 seats, 39.73%
Seats before	52	31
Seats won	63	18
Seat change	▲11	▼13
Popular vote	483,914	309,748
Percentage	51.17%	32.75%
Swing	▲6.7%	▼6.98%
	Third party	Fourth party
	NDP	SC
Leader	Pam Barrett	Randy Thorsteinson
Party	New Democratic	Social Credit
Leader since	1996	1993
Leader's seat	Edmonton-Highlands	ran in Red Deer-South (lost)
Last election	0 seats, 11.01%	0 seats, 2.41%
Seats before	0	0
Seats won	2	0
Seat change	▲2	0
Popular vote	83,292	64,667
Percentage	8.81%	6.84%
Swing	▼2.2%	▲4.43%
Premier before election
Ralph Klein
Progressive Conservative
Premier after election
Ralph Klein
Progressive Conservative

The 1997 Alberta general election was held on March 11, 1997, to elect members of the Legislative Assembly of Alberta.

The Progressive Conservative government led by Premier Ralph Klein won its eighth consecutive mandate going back to 1971, increasing its share of votes and seats in the Legislature relative to the previous election in 1993. The Liberal Party retained Official Opposition status, though it lost nearly half its seats. After an electoral wipeout in 1993, the NDP returned to the Legislature by winning two seats.

== Background ==
The Progressive Conservative Association had governed Alberta since 1971, and premier Ralph Klein led the party into his second general election as party leader. The previous election in 1993 was the best result for the Liberal Party since its last electoral victory in 1917.

This was the second consecutive election fought on a new set of electoral boundaries, due to an Alberta Court of Appeal decision that was critical of the map created in 1992. The government amended the Electoral Boundaries Commission Act, introducing the present system where the commission is made up of a justice from the Court, two members appointed by the governing party, and two members appointed by the official opposition. A new Commission was created, which issued its recommendations for a new set of electoral boundaries in 1996.

== Opinion polls ==
Evolution of voting intentions at provincial level
Polling firm	Last day of survey	Source	PCA	ALP	ANDP	Other	ME	Sample
Election 1997	March 11, 1997		51.17	32.75	8.81	7.27		
Angus Reid	January 25, 1997		63	24	11	3	3.5	801
Angus Reid	August 28, 1995		64	25	6	5	3.5	811
Election 1993	June 15, 1993		44.49	39.73	11.01	4.77		

== Results ==
Ralph Klein's second election as leader of the PCs was considerably more successful than his first. The party won over half the popular vote, and 63 of the 83 seats in the legislature for its eighth consecutive term in government. The party continued to dominate in Calgary and rural areas, and managed to regain a foothold in Edmonton where it won two seats.

The Liberal Party of Grant Mitchell lost about 7% of the popular vote it had won in the 1993 election. The party's legislative caucus was reduced from 32 members to 18.

Pam Barrett led the New Democratic Party back into the legislature with two seats (both in Edmonton), despite winning an even smaller share of the popular vote than in 1993.

The Social Credit Party also re-emerged, placing a strong second in several rural ridings, but did not win any seats.

Overall voter turnout was 53.75%.

Party	Party leader	# of candidates	Seats			Popular vote		
Party	Party leader	# of candidates	1993	Elected	% Change	#	%	% Change
Progressive Conservative	Ralph Klein	83	51	63	+23.5%	483,914	51.17%	+6.68%
Liberal	Grant Mitchell	83	32	18	-43.8%	309,748	32.75%	-6.98%
New Democratic	Pam Barrett	77	-	2		83,292	8.81%	-2.20%
Social Credit	Randy Thorsteinson	70	-	-	-	64,667	6.84%	+4.43%
Natural Law	Maury Shapka	16	-	-	-	1,303	0.14%	-0.37%
Green	David Parker	7	-	-	-	1,039	0.11%	-0.09%
Independent		6	-	-	-	1,092	0.11%	-0.82%
Forum	William Finn	4	*	-	*	597	0.06%	*
Communist	Naomi Rankin	1	-	-	-	61	0.01%	x
Total		347	83	83	-	945,713	100%	
Source: Elections Alberta

Notes:

* Party did not nominate candidates in the previous election.

x – less than 0.005% of the popular vote

Popular vote
PC	51.17%
Liberal	32.75%
New Democratic	8.81%
Social Credit	6.84%
Others	0.43%

Seats summary
PC	75.90%
Liberal	21.69%
New Democratic	2.41%

== Results by riding ==
Electoral district	Candidates					Incumbent
Electoral district	PC	Liberal	NDP	Social Credit	Other	Incumbent
Airdrie-Rocky View	Carol Louise Haley; 8,492; 68.93%	James Welsh; 2,197; 17.83%	Doris Bannister; 482; 3.91%	Peter Smits; 1,125; 9.13%		
Athabasca-Wabasca	Mike Cardinal; 3,380; 58.65%	Tony Mercredi; 1,481; 25.70%	Dean Patriquin; 300; 5.21%	Curtis Gunderson; 468; 8.12%	Harlan Light (Green); 100; 1.74%	Mike Cardinal
Banff-Cochrane	Janis Tarchuk; 7,180; 60.96%	Judy Stewart; 3,151; 26.75%	Jeff Eamon; 754; 6.40%	Scott Mudford; 661; 5.61%		Brian Evans
Barrhead-Westlock	Kenneth R. Kowalski; 6,195; 60.49%	Dale Greig; 2,130; 20.80%	Joe Woytowich; 643; 6.28%	J. Harvey Yuill; 1,244; 12.15%		Kenneth R. Kowalski
Bonnyville-Cold Lake	Denis Ducharme; 4,593; 58.32%	Leo Vasseur; 2,323; 29.50%		Robert Kratchmer; 948; 12.04%		
Calgary-Bow	Bonnie Laing; 6,664; 54.07%	Mark Dickerson; 4,091; 33.19%	Brent Johner; 1,144; 9.28%		Ronnie Shapka (Nat. Law); 158; 1.28% David Crowe (Green); 187; 1.52%	Bonnie Laing
Calgary-Buffalo	Terri-Lynn Bradford; 4,115; 43.52%	Gary Dickson; 4,310; 45.58%	Neil McKinnon; 547; 5.79%	Raymond Neilson; 300; 3.17%	Ralph Holt (Nat. Law); 115; 1.22%	Gary Dickson
Calgary-Cross	Yvonne Fritz; 5,964; 66.88%	Keith Jones; 2,456; 27.54%		Maurizio Terrigno; 467; 5.24%		Yvonne Fritz
Calgary-Currie	Jocelyn Burgener; 5,952; 53.83%	Mairi Matheson; 3,636; 32.88%	Liz Blackwood; 712; 6.44%	Jeff Townsend; 610; 5.52%	Richard Shelford (Nat. Law); 109; 0.99%	Jocelyn Burgener
Calgary-East	Moe Amery; 4,857; 59.78%	Kelly McDonnell; 1,990; 24.49%	Marg Elliot; 609; 7.50%	Raymond (Chick) Hurst; 613; 7.54%		Moe Amery
Calgary-Egmont	Denis Herard; 8,842; 64.48%	Pam York; 3,336; 24.33%	Larry Kowalchuk; 654; 4.77%	Douglas Cooper; 836; 6.10%		Denis Herard
Calgary-Elbow	Ralph Klein; 8,237; 57.78%	Harold Swanson; 5,195; 36.44%	Shawn Christie; 307; 2.15%	Lera G. Shirley; 421; 2.95%	Frank Haika (Nat. Law); 75; 0.53%	Ralph Klein
Calgary-Fish Creek	Heather Forsyth; 8,274; 66.47%	Marie Cameron; 3,020; 24.26%	Muriel Turner-Wilkinson; 348; 2.80%	Jeff Willerton; 778; 6.25%		Heather Forsyth
Calgary-Foothills	Patricia Black; 8,849; 60.35%	Albert W. Ludwig; 4,339; 29.59%	Brenda Wadey; 720; 4.91%	Kevin Davidson; 735; 5.01%		Patricia Black
Calgary-Fort	Wayne Cao; 4,410; 48.53%	Shirley-Anne Reuben; 2,817; 31.00%	Ken Sahil; 891; 9.81%	Bren Blanchet; 916; 10.08%		
Calgary-Glenmore	Ron Stevens; 8,247; 58.02%	Wayne Stewart; 4,919; 34.61%	Grace Johner; 435; 3.06%	Vernon Cook; 583; 4.10%		Dianne Mirosh
Calgary-Lougheed	Marlene Graham; 7,761; 65.89%	Darryl G. Hawkins; 2,906; 24.67%	Mara Vogel; 533; 4.53%	Hub Blanchet; 560; 4.75%		Jim Dinning
Calgary-McCall	Shiraz Shariff; 5,118; 58.67%	Amar Singh; 2,701; 30.96%		Rory M. Cory; 876; 10.04%		Harry Sohal
Calgary-Montrose	Hung Pham; 4,556; 58.56%	Diane Danielson; 2,576; 33.11%		Christopher Dick; 536; 6.89%	Neeraj Varma (Nat. Law); 94; 1.21%	Hung Pham
Calgary-Mountain View	Mark Hlady; 5,468; 48.36%	Patricia Ennis; 3,269; 28.91%	Gordon M. Christie; 2,085; 18.44%	Jason Nicholas; 450; 3.98%		Mark Hlady
Calgary-North Hill	Richard Charles Magnus; 6,379; 58.36%	John Schmale; 3,297; 30.16%	Jason Ness; 1,183; 10.82%			Richard Charles Magnus
Calgary-North West	Greg Melchin; 9,190; 53.19%	Frank Bruseker; 7,226; 41.82%	Jeff Pattinson; 342; 1.98%	Douglas A. Picken; 503; 2.91%		Frank Bruseker
Calgary-Nose Creek	Gary Mar; 7,815; 64.33%	Peter Willott; 2,894; 23.82%	Doral Johnson; 696; 5.73%	Greg Greene; 715; 5.89%		Gary Mar
Calgary-Shaw	Jonathan Niles Havelock; 12,304; 75.21%	Sharon L. Howe; 2,860; 17.48%	Shawn Keown; 485; 2.96%	Michael Roth; 624; 3.81%	Almas Walden (Nat. Law); 69; 0.42%	Jonathan Niles Havelock
Calgary-Varsity	Murray D. Smith; 7,232; 51.34%	Carrol Jaques; 5,414; 38.43%	Dirk Huysman; 640; 4.54%	Mike Bressers; 646; 4.59%	Joel Ashworth (Green); 132; 0.94%	Murray D. Smith
Calgary-West	Karen Kryczka; 8,478; 56.18%	Paul Adams; 4,995; 33.10%	Rudy Rogers; 534; 3.54%	Craig Chandler; 1,070; 7.09%		Danny Dalla-Longa
Cardston-Taber-Warner	Ron Hierath; 5,157; 59.06%	James Jackson; 1,471; 16.85%	Suzanne Sirias; 518; 5.93%	Ken Rose; 1,568; 17.96%		
Clover Bar-Fort Saskatchewan	Rob Lougheed; 6,864; 47.61%	Muriel Abdurahman; 6,364; 44.14%	Michael Berezowsky; 922; 6.39%		Max Cornelssen (Ind.); 235; 1.63%	Muriel Abdurahman
Cypress-Medicine Hat	Lorne Taylor; 5,754; 63.18%	Beverley Britton Clarke; 2,217; 24.34%	Don Crisall; 383; 4.21%	Maurice Perron; 728; 7.99%		Lorne Taylor
Drayton Valley-Calmar	Tom Thurber; 6,492; 60.41%	Moe Hamdon; 2,912; 27.10%	Tom Fuller; 823; 7.66%		Roy Andresen (Ind.); 488; 4.55%	Tom Thurber
Drumheller-Chinook	Shirley McClellan; 6,063; 63.28%	Einar B. Davison; 1,432; 14.95%		Dale Trefz; 2,056; 21.46%		
Dunvegan	Glen Clegg; 5,149; 54.56%	Fred Trotter; 3,314; 35.11%	Margaret McCuaig-Boyd; 961; 10.18%			Glen Clegg
Edmonton-Beverly-Clareview	Julius E. Yankowsky; 3,484; 34.93%	Johanne Tardif; 3,127; 31.35%	Bill Stephenson; 2,842; 28.49%	Doug Smith; 376; 3.77%	Andy Chichak (Ind.); 100; 1.00% William Finn (Forum); 29; 0.29%	
Edmonton-Calder	Lynn Faulder; 3,860; 32.32%	Lance D. White; 4,802; 40.21%	Alex McEachern; 3,250; 27.21%			
Edmonton-Castle Downs	Ihor Broda; 4,373; 40.43%	Pamela Paul; 4,456; 41.20%	Peter Johnsen; 1,494; 13.81%	David H. Friesen; 460; 4.25%		
Edmonton-Centre	Don Weiderman; 3,634; 33.36%	Laurie Blakeman; 4,769; 43.78%	Jenn Smith; 1,845; 16.94%	Alan Cruikshank; 420; 3.86%	Emil van der Poorten (Forum); 98; 0.90% Richard Johnsen (Nat. Law); 83; 0.76%	Michael Henry
Edmonton-Ellerslie	Jasbeer Singh; 2,641; 25.96%	Debby Carlson; 5,752; 56.54%	Henry Johns; 913; 8.97%	Ken Way; 840; 8.26%		Debby Carlson
Edmonton-Glengarry	Don Clarke; 3,474; 34.38%	Bill Bonner; 4,765; 47.15%	William Kobluk; 1,366; 13.52%	Barbie-Jo Williams; 335; 3.32%	David Sharkey (Nat. Law); 76; 0.75% Carl Williams (Ind.); 46; 0.46%	Laurence Decore
Edmonton-Glenora	Kim MacKenzie; 4,368; 36.18%	Howard Sapers; 5,785; 47.92%	Arlene Young; 1,198; 9.92%	Jon Dykstra; 630; 5.22%	Sam Thomas (Nat. Law); 69; 0.57%	Howard Sapers
Edmonton-Gold Bar	Susan Green; 5,819; 37.52%	Hugh MacDonald; 7,528; 48.55%	Walter Heneghan; 1,970; 12.70%		David J. Parker (Green); 92; 0.59% Maury Shapka (Nat. Law); 75; 0.48%	Bettie Hewes
Edmonton-Highlands	Jim Campbell; 2,793; 24.96%	Chris Smith; 2,284; 20.41%	Pam Barrett; 5,638; 50.38%	Tim Friesen; 419; 3.74%		
Edmonton-Manning	Tony Vandermeer; 4,358; 35.44%	Ed Gibbons; 5,140; 41.80%	Hana Razga; 2,229; 18.13%	R. Jordan Harris; 524; 4.26%		Peter Sekulic
Edmonton-McClung	Michael Mooney; 5,259; 40.71%	Grant Mitchell; 6,322; 48.94%	Richard Vanderberg; 713; 5.52%	Patrick D. Ellis; 542; 4.20%	Wade McKinley (Nat. Law); 61; 0.47%	Grant Mitchell
Edmonton-Meadowlark	Laurie Pushor; 4,672; 38.72%	Karen Leibovici; 6,047; 50.11%	Terry McNally; 831; 6.89%	Aaron Hinman; 435; 3.60%	Geoff Toane (Nat. Law); 55; 0.46%	Karen Leibovici
Edmonton-Mill Creek	Sukhi Randhawa; 3,679; 28.23%	Gene Zwozdesky; 6,757; 51.84%	Stephen Crocker; 1,804; 13.84%	Christie Forget; 776; 5.95%		
Edmonton-Mill Woods	Ziad N. Jaber; 2,993; 29.97%	Don Massey; 5,113; 51.19%	Ricardo Acuna; 1,266; 12.68%	John Filp; 546; 5.47%	Raymond Boyko (Green); 52; 0.52%	Don Massey
Edmonton-Norwood	Andrew Beniuk; 2,583; 27.98%	Sue Olsen; 3,357; 36.36%	Sherry McKibben; 2,767; 29.97%	Ray Loyer; 485; 5.25%		Andrew Beniuk
Edmonton-Riverview	Gwen Harris; 5,122; 35.43%	Linda Sloan; 6,066; 41.96%	Donna Fong; 2,261; 15.64%	David Prenoslo; 805; 5.57%	William Chapman (Nat. Law); 87; 0.60% Naomi Rankin (Comm.); 61; 0.42%	
Edmonton-Rutherford	Brenda Platzer; 5,078; 38.91%	Percy Wickman; 6,007; 46.03%	Will Hodgson; 1,156; 8.86%	David Lincoln; 674; 5.16%	Ian Zaharko (Ind.); 19; 0.15%	Percy Wickman
Edmonton-Strathcona	John Logan; 4,096; 30.44%	Mary MacDonald; 4,214; 31.31%	Raj Pannu; 4,272; 31.74%	John Forget; 552; 4.10%	Eshwar Jagdeo (Nat. Law); 47; 0.35% Myles Kitagawa (Green); 236; 1.75%	Al Zariwny
Edmonton-Whitemud	David Hancock; 7,973; 50.79%	Corky Meyer; 5,953; 37.92%	Charan Khehra; 1,012; 6.45%	Kevin Bialobzyski; 635; 4.04%	Randy T. Fritz (Nat. Law); 59; 0.38%	Mike Percy
Fort McMurray	Guy C. Boutilier; 5,420; 55.64%	John S. Vyboh; 4,008; 41.14%	Rodney McCallum; 280; 2.87%			Adam Germain
Grande Prairie-Smoky	Walter Paszkowski; 5,753; 64.49%	John A. Croken; 1,995; 22.36%	Linda Smith; 1,143; 12.81%			Walter Paszkowski
Grande Prairie-Wapiti	Wayne Jacques; 5,592; 63.08%	Ray Stitsen; 2,003; 22.59%	Campbell Ross; 1,247; 14.07%			Wayne Jacques
Highwood	Don Tannas; 9,551; 69.76%	Howard Paulsen; 1,944; 14.20%	Hugh Logie; 592; 4.32%	John Bergen; 1,566; 11.44%		Don Tannas
Innisfail-Sylvan Lake	Gary Severtson; 7,012; 59.53%	Raymond C. Reckseidler; 2,206; 18.73%	Linda Neilson; 583; 4.95%	Carl Thorsteinson; 1,960; 16.64%		Gary Severtson
Lac La Biche-St. Paul	Paul Langevin; 4,799; 53.71%	Vital Ouellette; 2,901; 32.47%	Grace Johnston; 419; 4.69%	Peter Tychkowsky; 483; 5.41%	Don Ronaghan (Forum); 191; 2.14% Louis Real Theriault (Ind.); 114; 1.28%	Paul Langevin
Lacombe-Stettler	Judy Gordon; 6,414; 61.62%	Garfield Marks; 1,181; 11.35%	Lynne Gendron; 1,068; 10.26%	Bob Argent; 1,725; 16.57%		Judy Gordon
Leduc	Albert Klapstein; 6,857; 51.42%	Terry Kirkland; 4,797; 35.97%	Bill Schlacht; 767; 5.75%	Henry Neumann; 891; 6.68%		Terry Kirkland
Lesser Slave Lake	Pearl M. Calahasen; 3,389; 60.33%	Ralph Chalifoux; 1,139; 20.28%	Glenn Laboucan; 442; 7.87%	Robert J. Alford; 624; 11.11%		Pearl M. Calahasen
Lethbridge-East	Leah Waters; 3,813; 29.46%	Ken Nicol; 7,578; 58.54%	Inga Jesswein; 674; 5.21%	Jonathan Williams; 853; 6.59%		Ken Nicol
Lethbridge-West	Clint Dunford; 5,679; 45.23%	Leslie Vaala; 4,765; 37.95%	Tom Hovan; 806; 6.42%	Brian Stewart; 1,043; 8.31%	Don Ferguson (Green); 240; 1.91%	Clint Dunford
Little Bow	Barry McFarland; 6,726; 69.17%	Alida Hess; 2,075; 21.34%	Marko Hilgersom; 868; 8.93%			Barry McFarland
Livingstone-Macleod	David Coutts; 5,337; 50.84%	Ernie Patterson; 3,924; 37.38%	Gwen De Maere; 508; 4.84%	Bob Bysouth; 703; 6.70%		
Medicine Hat	Rob Renner; 5,853; 51.48%	Trevor Butts; 3,232; 28.43%	George Peterson; 1,065; 9.37%	Dale Glasier; 1,177; 10.35%		Rob Renner
Olds-Didsbury-Three Hills	Richard Marz; 6,958; 56.95%	Dave Herbert; 1,562; 12.78%	Anne Wilson; 247; 2.02%	Don MacDonald; 3,422; 28.01%		
Peace River	Gary Friedel; 3,745; 61.25%	Bruce MacKeen; 2,323; 37.99%				Gary Friedel
Ponoka-Rimbey	Halvar C. Jonson; 5,750; 63.80%	Joshua Phillpotts; 912; 10.12%	Liz Wetheral; 879; 9.75%	Randy Jones; 1,439; 15.97%		Halvar C. Jonson
Red Deer-North	Stockwell Day; 4,683; 55.37%	Norm McDougall; 2,547; 30.11%	Linda Kaiser; 560; 6.62%	E. Patricia Argent; 655; 7.74%		Stockwell Day
Red Deer-South	Victor Doerksen; 5,751; 46.91%	Larry Pimm; 4,966; 40.51%	Joanne Stanley; 367; 2.99%	Randy Thorsteinson; 1,145; 9.34%		Victor Doerksen
Redwater	Dave Broda; 5,297; 43.76%	Mary Anne Balsillie; 4,980; 41.14%	Tom Turner; 737; 6.09%	Don Bell; 987; 8.15%	E. Benjamin Toane (Nat. Law); 71; 0.59%	Nicholas Taylor
Rocky Mountain House	Ty Lund; 5,610; 54.69%	Roxanne V. Prior; 880; 8.58%	Christine McMeckan; 481; 4.69%	Lavern J. Ahlstrom; 3,264; 31.82%		Ty Lund
Sherwood Park	Iris Evans; 8,610; 47.80%	Bruce Collingwood; 8,305; 46.11%	Vaughn Dyrland; 1,064; 5.91%			Bruce Collingwood
Spruce Grove-Sturgeon-St. Albert	Gary Swinamer; 5,388; 42.52%	Colleen Soetaert; 6,275; 49.51%	Thomas Elchuk; 476; 3.76%	Clinton Day; 491; 3.87%		Colleen Soetaert
St. Albert	Mary O'Neill; 6,696; 43.53%	Len Bracko; 6,680; 43.43%	Chris Samuel; 1,198; 7.79%	John Reil; 781; 5.08%		Len Bracko
Stony Plain	Stan Woloshyn; 6,267; 48.85%	Peter Marchiel; 3,906; 30.44%	Felice Young; 895; 6.98%	Pat Hansard; 1,742; 13.58%		Stan Woloshyn
Strathmore-Brooks	Lyle Oberg; 7,235; 72.40%	Roger Nelson; 1,272; 12.73%	Richard Knutson; 600; 6.00%	Dan Borden; 862; 8.63%		
Vegreville-Viking	Ed Stelmach; 6,090; 49.71%	Ross Demkiw; 3,639; 29.70%	Greg Kurulok; 1,684; 13.74%	Clifford Gundermann; 810; 6.61%		Ed Stelmach
Vermilion-Lloydminster	Steve West; 5,616; 55.33%	Pat Gulak; 2,787; 27.46%	Wes Neumeier; 602; 5.93%	Jeff Newland; 1,125; 11.08%		Steve West
Wainwright	Robert A. (Butch) Fischer; 6,232; 52.61%	Ronald Williams; 1,568; 13.24%	Lilas I. Lysne; 668; 5.64%	Jerry D. Barber; 3,348; 28.27%		Robert A. (Butch) Fischer
West Yellowhead	Ivan J. Strang; 4,498; 41.96%	Duco Van Binsbergen; 3,795; 35.40%	Glenn Taylor; 2,130; 19.87%	John Ahlstrom; 275; 2.57%		Duco Van Binsbergen
Wetaskiwin-Camrose	LeRoy Johnson; 7,244; 58.39%	Jody Saddleback; 1,166; 9.40%	Rick Jantz; 2,060; 16.60%	Karen Richert; 1,622; 13.07%	Bruce Hinkley (Forum); 279; 2.26%	Ken Rostad
Whitecourt-Ste. Anne	Peter Trynchy; 5,759; 54.12%	Sara Lynn Burrough; 2,954; 27.76%	Chauncey Featherstone; 704; 6.62%	Earle Cunningham; 1,183; 11.12%		Peter Trynchy

== See also ==
- List of Alberta political parties
