= John Younie =

Canadian politician

Member of the Legislative Assembly of Alberta
- In office 1986–1989
- Preceded by: Rollie Cook
- Succeeded by: Laurence Decore
- Constituency: Edmonton-Glengarry

Personal details
- Born: March 30, 1950 (age 76) Olds, Alberta
- Party: Alberta New Democrats

John Younie (born March 3, 1950) is a former provincial level politician from Alberta, Canada. He served as a member of the Legislative Assembly of Alberta for a single term from 1986 to 1989 and sat as a member of the New Democrats caucus when they held official opposition status.

== Political career ==
Younie ran for a seat in the Alberta Legislature in the 1979 Alberta general election in the electoral district of Rocky Mountain House. He finished a distant third place out of four candidates behind future Social Credit leader Lavern Ahlstrom and John Murray Campbell who won the district.

He would make another attempt to win a seat by running in the 1986 Alberta general election. He won a hotly contested race in the electoral district of Edmonton-Glengarry by a safe margin defeating four other candidates.

Younie ran for a second term in the 1989 Alberta general election but was defeated in a landslide by Laurence Decore who had become leader of the Liberals the previous year.
