= Rollie Cook =

Canadian politician

Roland "Rollie" David Bertram Cook

Member of the Legislative Assembly of Alberta
- In office 1979–1986
- Preceded by: New District
- Succeeded by: John Younie
- Constituency: Edmonton-Glengarry

Personal details
- Born: March 22, 1952 (age 74) Edmonton, Alberta
- Party: Progressive Conservative

Roland "Rollie" David Bertram Cook (born March 22, 1952) was a provincial level politician from Alberta, Canada. He served as a member of the Legislative Assembly of Alberta from 1979 to 1986.

== Early life ==
Roland Cook was born in Edmonton, Alberta on March 22, 1952. He later moved to Calgary and attended Western Canada High School. After graduating he moved back to Edmonton and attended the University of Alberta. He graduated with a B.A. in History and Political Science. He worked for the leadership campaign for Joe Clark who won the leadership of the Progressive Conservative Party of Canada and later became Prime Minister of Canada. He continued his campaign experience working for Congressman Morris Udall's campaign for the Democratic Party Presidential nomination.

While working for Congressman Udall, he co-chaired the 1986 Udall campaign in Westchester County and the Bronx in New York State. He volunteered for the Jimmy Carter campaign in the state of Maine. He also attended The University of Laval and Paul Valéry University in France. After his post secondary education he was hired by a Public Relations Firm in Alberta.

== Political career ==
Cook ran for a seat for the first time in the 1979 Alberta general election. He easily won the new electoral district of Edmonton-Glengarry to pick it up for the governing Progressive Conservative party. At the age of 26, he was the youngest member of the Assembly. He served on the Heritage Savings and Trust Committee and was a member of the caucus committee on law and regulation. Cook won a second term in office in the 1982 Alberta general election. He managed to increase his popular vote, but faced a significant challenge from New Democrat candidate Garth Stevenson. In his first term he served as a delegate for Alberta for two of the constitutional conferences which led to the new amending formula for the Canadian Constitution and the Canadian Charter of Rights.

Cook was defeated in a nomination race to run again in 1986. After being defeated in the nomination race, Cook left provincial politics at the dissolution of the legislature in 1986. He taught at the Chemical Engineering University in Beijing China for two years from 1989 to 1991. He returned to Canada, worked in international trade and then retired to a small mixed farm on Salt Spring Island where he worked to restore an old farm raise sheep, ducks and organic vegetables and share good food and good times with family and friends.
