= Terry Kirkland =

Canadian politician

Member of the Legislative Assembly of Alberta for Leduc
- In office 1993–1997
- Preceded by: James Henderson
- Succeeded by: Albert Klapstein

Personal details
- Born: February 12, 1948 (age 78) Alberta, Canada
- Party: Alberta Liberal Party

Terry F. Kirkland (born February 12, 1948) is a former provincial politician from Alberta, Canada. He was a member of the Legislative Assembly of Alberta from 1993 to 1997.

== Political career ==
Kirkland was elected to the Alberta Legislature in the 1993 Alberta general election. He defeated the incumbent MLA, Donald H. Sparrow, to win the reconstituted Leduc electoral district for the Liberals. He ran for a second term in office in the 1997 Alberta general election but was defeated by the Progressive Conservative candidate, Albert Klapstein.

Kirkland attempted to win a seat in the Edmonton-Highlands by-election held on June 12, 2000, but was defeated by NDP candidate Brian Mason.
