= Andrew Beniuk =

Canadian politician

Andrew George Beniuk (born April 26, 1944) is a former provincial level politician from Alberta, Canada. He served as a Member of the Alberta Legislature from 1993 until 1997 and has since tried to regain his seat twice since being defeated.

== Political career ==
Beniuk was elected to his first term in the Alberta Legislature in the 1993 Alberta general election. He defeated NDP Leader Ray Martin in a surprise win to pick up Edmonton-Norwood for the Liberals. On June 23, 1995 Beniuk was removed from the Liberal caucus and sat as an Independent. He joined the Progressive Conservatives in 1996. Beniuk ran for re-election in the 1997 Alberta general election but was defeated by Sue Olsen of his former party. Beniuk tried to regain his seat in the 2001 Alberta general election but was defeated by Bill Bonner in the Edmonton-Glengarry electoral district. In 2008 he attempted to repeat his 1993 feat and ran against NDP leader Brian Mason in Edmonton Highlands-Norwood. He was easily defeated by Mason.

Legislative Assembly of Alberta
Preceded by Ray Martin	MLA for Edmonton-Norwood; 1993–1997	Succeeded by Sue Olsen
