= Albert Klapstein =

Canadian politician (born 1940)

Member of the Legislative Assembly of Alberta for Leduc
- In office 1997–2004
- Preceded by: Terry Kirkland
- Succeeded by: district abolished

Personal details
- Born: November 28, 1940 (age 85) Edmonton, Alberta, Canada
- Died: April 15, 2023
- Party: Progressive Conservative Association of Alberta

Albert Klapstein (born November 28, 1940) is a former provincial level politician from Alberta, Canada. He served as a member of the Legislative Assembly of Alberta from 1997 until 2004.

== Political career ==
Klapstein was elected to the Alberta Legislature in the 1997 Alberta general election. He defeated incumbent Liberal MLA Terry Kirkland in a hotly contested election to pick up the Leduc electoral district for the Progressive Conservatives. He was reelected to his second term, winning a landslide in the 2001 Alberta general election.

Klapstein was appointed as an ex officio member by Minister of Agriculture, Food and Rural Development Shirley McClellan in July 2000. This appointment came under investigation by the ethics commissioner Robert Clark in 2003 as a breach of the Conflict of Interest Act. After the investigation, Klapstein was found to have breached the Act but no penalties were imposed.

Klapstein did not run for reelection at the dissolution of the assembly in 2004 after losing the nomination race for the new riding of Leduc-Beaumont-Devon to George Rogers.
