= Colleen Soetaert =

Canadian politician

Member of the Legislative Assembly of Alberta
- In office June 15, 1993 – March 12, 2001
- Preceded by: New District
- Succeeded by: Doug Horner
- Constituency: Spruce Grove-Sturgeon-St. Albert

Personal details
- Born: April 7, 1956 (age 70) Westlock, Alberta
- Party: Liberal

Colleen Marie Soetaert is a former provincial politician from Alberta, Canada. She served as a member of the Legislative Assembly of Alberta from 1993 until 2001 sitting with the Liberal caucus in opposition.

== Political career ==
Soetaert ran for a seat to the Alberta Legislature for the first time in the 1993 Alberta general election. She won the new electoral district of Spruce Grove-Sturgeon-St. Albert just north of Edmonton picking up the district for the Liberals. Soetart won the tight race finishing 1,400 votes ahead of second place Progressive Conservative candidate Norm Kluthe. There were two other candidates rounding out the field.

Soetaert was re-elected to her second term in the Legislature increasing her vote total in the 1997 Alberta general election. Despite winning a larger vote, her percentage of the popular vote dropped as she won with just under half of the popular vote. Progressive Conservative candidate Gary Swinamer finished a close second and two other candidates rounded out the field.

Soetaert ran for a third term in office in the 2001 Alberta general election. She was defeated by Progressive Conservative candidate Doug Horner who won by a margin of almost 3,000 votes. She was shocked about her defeat and told supporters in her campaign office that "God must want me somewhere else".

== Late life ==
After her defeated from provincial politics Soetaert founded the West Sturgeon Aging in Place Foundation which raised 8 million dollars to build the West Country Hearth retirement home. She also performs in live theater productions.
