= Sue Olsen =

Canadian politician

Sue Olsen is a former provincial level politician from Alberta, Canada. She served as a member of the Legislative Assembly of Alberta from 1997 until 2001.

== Political career ==
Olsen was elected to the Alberta Legislature in the 1997 Alberta general election. She defeated incumbent Andrew Beniuk to win her only term in office.

Olsen resigned her seat in the Alberta Legislature to run for a seat in the House of Commons of Canada in the electoral district of Edmonton Centre-East as a federal Liberal candidate in the 2000 federal election. The election was closely contested but, Olsen lost by 3000 votes to incumbent Member of Parliament Peter Goldring.

Legislative Assembly of Alberta
Preceded by Andrew Beniuk	MLA Edmonton Norwood; 1997–2001	Succeeded by Gary Masyk
