= Gary Severtson =

Canadian politician

Member of the Legislative Assembly of Alberta
- In office 1989–1993
- Preceded by: Nigel Pengelly
- Constituency: Innisfail
- In office 1993–2001
- Succeeded by: Luke Ouellette
- Constituency: Innisfail-Sylvan Lake

Personal details
- Born: March 18, 1944 (age 82) Innisfail, Alberta
- Party: Progressive Conservative
- Occupation: Farmer

Gary N. Severtson (born March 18, 1944) is a former farmer, and provincial level politician from Alberta, Canada. He served as a member of the Legislative Assembly of Alberta from 1989 to 2001.

== Early life ==
Severtson had been working as a farmer since the 1960s. In 1982 he joined the Olds College Board of Governors and served his first stint until 1989.

== Political career ==
Severtson was elected to the Alberta Legislature in the 1989 Alberta general election. He won the Innisfail electoral district easily over two other candidates. Innisfail was abolished due to redistribution, he ran in the new Innisfail-Sylvan Lake electoral district and won his second term in office in the 1993 Alberta general election. He would defeat five candidates in that election including George Flake who went on to lead the Alberta Political Alliance.

Severtson introduced Bill 212 The Teaching Profession Amendment Act. The bill was opposed strongly by the Alberta Teachers Association as it would have made membership in the union optional for those in the teaching profession. The bill was withdrawn voluntarily but was later reintroduced in February 1995 as Bill 210. The second bill was defeated on second reading 56 to 12 on a recorded division.

In September 1995 Severtson along with four other MLA's joined the board of directors for 668344 Alberta Ltd. founded by Calgary Shaw MLA Jon Havelock. The company became unofficially known as Tory Oil. The company drew the attention of ethics Commissioner Robert Clark who had a public show down with Havelock in 1997.

Severtson was re-elected to his third term in the 1997 Alberta general election. He won the district with the largest plurality of his electoral career defeating three other candidates. In 1997 Severtson chaired the School Facilities Task Force. The task force under his leadership wrote a report after extensive public consultation. The report warned about student population growth in under served areas and lack of money for infrastructure. The report was submitted to be enacted by former Minister of Finance Gary Mar. He retired at dissolution of the Legislature in 2001.

== Late life ==
After retiring from provincial politics, Severtson re-joined the Olds College Board of Governors.
