= Richard Marz =

Canadian politician

Member of the Legislative Assembly of Alberta
- In office March 11, 1997 – April 23, 2012
- Preceded by: new district
- Succeeded by: Bruce Rowe
- Constituency: Olds-Didsbury-Three Hills

Personal details
- Born: April 30, 1944 (age 81) Three Hills, Alberta
- Party: Progressive Conservative
- Spouse: Janis
- Children: LaVonne and Rick
- Occupation: farmer

Richard Marz (born April 30, 1944, in Three Hills, Alberta) is a Canadian politician who was the Member of the Legislative Assembly of Alberta representing the constituency of Olds-Didsbury-Three Hills as a Progressive Conservative.

== Early life ==
Marz was born and raised in Three Hills, Alberta. After high school, he worked in the oil patch and briefly joined the Calgary Police Service. Since 1966, he has operated a farm in the Three Hills area.

== Political career ==
Before entering provincial politics, Marz was active in municipal politics. He was elected as councillor in the municipal district of Kneehill in 1980. Marz served as a councillor for 17 years, including six years as deputy reeve and seven years as reeve. During this period, Marz was a founding member of the Provincial Health Council and a chair of the Central Alberta Association of Municipal Districts and Counties. He has served as a board member for the Didsbury General and Auxiliary Hospital and Three Hills Health Care Centre.

During his third term, Marz was elected Deputy Speaker and Chair of Committees. He chaired numerous committees since taking office in 1997, including the Standing Committee on Community Services, the Employability Council, the Farm Assessment and Taxation Committee, and the Labour Relations Code Review Committee.

Marz was elected to his fourth term representing the constituency of Olds-Didsbury-Three Hills in the 2008 provincial election, receiving 64 per cent of the vote. During that term he served as deputy chair of the Select Special Ethics Commissioner Search Committee, and sat on the Cabinet Policy Committee on the Economy; the Agenda and Priorities Committee; the Legislative Offices Committee; the Privileges and Elections, Standing Orders and Printing Committee; and the Standing Committee on the Economy.

== Personal life ==
Marz lives on a farm near Three Hills with his wife, Janis. The couple has two adult children, LaVonne and Rick, and four grandchildren.

He has been involved in the Disabled Transportation Society, the Three Hills and District Seed Plant, the Trochu Gun Club and the Three Hills Rodeo Committee.

== Election results ==
1997 Alberta general election: Olds-Didsbury-Three Hills
Party	Candidate	Votes	%
Progressive Conservative	Richard Marz	6,958	57.08
Social Credit	Don MacDonald	3,422	28.07
Liberal	Dave Herbert	1,562	12.81
New Democratic	Anne Wilson	247	2.03
Total		12,189	99.63
Rejected, spoiled and declined		45	0.37
Turnout		12,234	61.69
Eligible voters		19,830	
Progressive Conservative pickup new district.			
Source(s) Source: "Olds-Didsbury-Three Hills Official Results 1997 Alberta general election". Elections Alberta.

2001 Alberta general election: Olds-Didsbury-Three Hills
Party	Candidate	Votes	%	±%
Progressive Conservative	Richard Marz	10,553	80.81	+23.73
Liberal	Gayleen Roelfsema	1,663	12.73	-0.08
Social Credit	Nicholas Semmler	460	3.52	-24.55
New Democratic	Brenda L. Dyck	383	2.93	+0.91
Total		13,059	99.59	–
Rejected, spoiled and declined		54	0.41	+0.04
Turnout		13,113	61.30	-0.39
Eligible voters		21,391		
Progressive Conservative hold		Swing		+11.90
Source(s) Source: "Olds-Didsbury-Three Hills Official Results 2001 Alberta general election". Alberta Heritage Community Foundation. "Electoral Division of Olds-Didsbury-Three Hills Statement of Official Results". Elections Alberta.

2004 Alberta general election: Olds-Didsbury-Three Hills
Party	Candidate	Votes	%	±%
Progressive Conservative	Richard Marz	7,277	59.40	-21.41
Alberta Alliance	Gordon Quantz	2,023	16.51	–
Liberal	Tony Vonesch	1,336	10.91	-1.83
Separation	Brian Vasseur	746	6.09	–
Green	Sarah Henckel-Sutmoller	469	3.83	–
New Democratic	Christopher Davies	257	2.10	-0.84
Social Credit	Myrna Kissick	143	1.17	-2.36
Total		12,251	99.43	–
Rejected, spoiled and declined		70	0.57	+0.16
Turnout		12,321	56.73	-4.57
Eligible voters		21,718		
Progressive Conservative hold		Swing		-18.96
Source(s) Source: "Olds-Didsbury-Three Hills Statement of Official Results 2004 Alberta general election" (PDF). Elections Alberta.

2008 Alberta general election: Olds-Didsbury-Three Hills
Party	Candidate	Votes	%	±%
Progressive Conservative	Richard Marz	7,837	64.06	+4.67
Wildrose	Curt Engel	2,572	21.03	+4.51
Liberal	Tony Vonesch	1,038	8.49	-2.42
Green	Kate Haddow	518	4.23	+0.41
New Democratic	Andy Davies	268	2.19	+0.09
Total		12,233	99.52	–
Rejected, spoiled and declined		59	0.48	-0.09
Turnout		12,292	47.20	-9.53
Eligible voters		26,040		
Progressive Conservative hold		Swing		+0.08
Source(s) Source: "Olds-Didsbury-Three Hills Official Results 2008 Alberta general election". Elections Alberta.
