= Gary Masyk =

Canadian businessman and politician

Gary Masyk (born 1960) is a businessman and politician in Alberta, Canada.

Born in High Prairie, Masyk owned Garco Oilfield Service and Masyk Lumber Company before entering politics. He was elected to the Legislative Assembly of Alberta as a Progressive Conservative to represent Edmonton–Norwood in 2001.

Masyk once attracted controversy when he advocated sending criminals to work in salt mines. Masyk is probably best known for his highly controversial comments that ran in an Edmonton Journal column on February 27, 2003; elaborating on his proposal to send repeat offenders to Russian salt mines, Masyk seemingly praised the hardline intimidation tactics employed in Soviet Union gulags during the Stalinist era. Appearing to disparage human rights, Masyk was forced by Premier Ralph Klein to issue an apology on the following day.

On June 29, 2004, Masyk left the Tory caucus after Premier Klein's health care policies became an issue and, according to Masyk, a factor in the outcome of the 2004 federal election. Masyk blamed Klein for the federal Conservative Party's defeat, and joined the upstart Alberta Alliance. He became that party's first Member of the Legislative Assembly (MLA). However, it was more likely that Masyk's defection was an act of defiance to a party that chastised him and removed his seat from the Edmonton electoral map, making it difficult for Masyk to gain a new Conservative nomination.

Before the 26th Alberta general election, the Edmonton Norwood electoral district was merged with Edmonton Highlands. Although Masyk sought re-election in the November 22 vote, he ran in Edmonton—Decore to avoid a run against Alberta New Democratic Party leader, Brian Mason.

The Alliance proved to have little support in a city that was more interested in supporting a tight three-way race between the Tories, Liberals and NDP. On election day, Masyk placed fourth. Despite Masyk's loss, he was replaced in the Legislature by Paul Hinman from Cardston-Taber-Warner as the sole Alliance representative.

Legislative Assembly of Alberta
Preceded by Sue Olsen	MLA Edmonton Norwood; 2001–2004	Succeeded by District Abolished
