= Bill Bonner (politician) =

Canadian politician

Bill Bonner is a former provincial level politician. He was a member of the Legislative Assembly of Alberta from 1997 to 2004.

== Political career ==
Bonner was elected to the Legislative Assembly of Alberta in the 1997 Alberta general election. He won the electoral district of Edmonton-Glengarry by over 1,000 votes over Don Clarke of the Progressive Conservatives and four other candidates. Bonner was re-elected to a second term in the 2001 Alberta general election. He won by 69 votes over former the MLA Andrew Beniuk. The race was the closest of the 2001 general election. Bonner retired at the end of his second term in office.

Legislative Assembly of Alberta
Preceded by Laurence Decore	MLA Edmonton-Glengarry; 1997-2004	Succeeded by District Abolished
