= Paul Langevin (politician) =

Canadian politician

Paul Andre Joseph Langevin (January 15, 1942 – November 11, 2008) was a provincial politician from Alberta, Canada.

== Political career ==
Langevin first ran as a Liberal candidate in the St. Paul electoral district in the 1989 Alberta general election. He was defeated by incumbent Progressive Conservative MLA John Drobot.

Langevin ran for the Liberals a second time and was elected to the Alberta Legislature in the 1993 Alberta general election winning the new riding of Lac La Biche-St. Paul. He won the riding defeating two other candidates in a closely contested race. In 1994 he left the Liberal caucus and sat as an Independent. On April 24, 1995 he joined the Progressive Conservatives giving up Independent status. He ran for a second term in office in the 1997 Alberta general election. He won re-election with a reduced popular vote in a six way race.

On October 5, 2000, he announced a $1.2 million project to build the Lakeland Interpretive Centre and Regional Leisure Complex and a quarter of a million dollar grant to restore the Lac La Biche Mission Historic Site as part of the provinces centennial celebrations. Langevin retired from provincial politics at dissolution of the Assembly in 2001.

== Honours ==
Langevin held the Order of La Pléiade from the Assembly of La Francophonie.

On November 11, 2008, Paul Langevin died in St. Paul, Alberta, at the age of 66.

Legislative Assembly of Alberta
Preceded by New District	MLA Lac La Biche-St. Paul; 1993–2001	Succeeded by Ray Danyluk
