= Mary O'Neill (Canadian politician) =

Canadian politician (born 1941)

Member of the Legislative Assembly of Alberta for St. Albert
- In office March 11, 1997 – November 22, 2004
- Preceded by: Len Bracko
- Succeeded by: Jack Flaherty

Personal details
- Born: November 7, 1941 (age 84) Toronto, Ontario, Canada
- Party: Progressive Conservative Association of Alberta
- Spouse: John Stafford O'Neill (m. 1975; died 2023)
- Children: 2
- Occupation: Teacher

Mary O'Neill (née Paterson; born November 7, 1941) is a politician and former member of the Legislative Assembly of Alberta.

O'Neill graduated from the University of Toronto with a Bachelor of Arts, and subsequently received her teaching certification from the Ontario College of Education. She taught in both public and private schools. After retiring from teaching, she worked as a realtor and served as a school trustee with the Greater St. Albert Catholic Schools. She was married to John Stafford "Jack" O'Neill, who was chief commissioner of the Alberta Human Rights Commission. They had two children.

In the 1997 provincial election, O'Neill was the Progressive Conservative candidate in the riding of St. Albert, where she faced Liberal incumbent Len Bracko. In the closest race of the election, O'Neill defeated Bracko by 16 votes. In a rematch during the 2001 election, O'Neill increased her lead over Bracko to more than two thousand votes in her successful bid for re-election.

In office, O'Neill was best known for sponsoring the School Trustee Statutes Amendment Act, 2002, which proposed to prohibit teachers from serving as school trustees anywhere in the province (at the time, teachers were only prohibited from serving as trustees in the district in which they taught). The Act was passed by the legislature, but was struck down as contravening the Charter of Rights and Freedoms by the Alberta Court of Queen's Bench two years later. O'Neill also served as a member of one of the Ralph Klein government's "truth squads", formed to defend the government's highly controversial Health Care Protection Act (Bill 11). She chaired the 2000 Fees and Charges Review Committee, which made recommendations on a wide variety of government-assessed fees.

In the 2004 provincial election, O'Neill was defeated by Liberal Jack Flaherty. Since her defeat, she has served on the University of Alberta Senate, on the Northern Alberta Institute of Technology Board of Governors, and as the Executive Director of the Glenrose Rehabilitation Hospital Foundation. She has remained politically active, organizing the first debate of the 2006 Progressive Conservative leadership election and endorsing Brent Rathgeber in his bid to secure the Conservative Party of Canada nomination in Edmonton—St. Albert. In May 2007, O'Neill quelled speculation that she would run in the next provincial election, stating that she wasn't interested.

Preceded by Len Bracko	MLA St. Albert; 1997-2004	Succeeded by Jack Flaherty
