= Wayne Jacques =

Canadian politician

Wayne Jacques is a former provincial level politician from Alberta, Canada. He served as a member of the Legislative Assembly of Alberta from 1993 to 2001.

== Political career ==
Jacques was elected to the Alberta Legislature in the 1993 Alberta general election. He won a closely contested three-way election finishing 500 votes higher than second place Dwight Logan, a candidate for the Liberals. He won his second term in office with a more decisive margin defeating two other candidates in the 1997 Alberta general election. On October 2, 2000, Jacques and Grande Prairie Smoky MLA Walter Paszkowski jointly announced a 1.2 million dollar centennial grant to upgrade the Grande Prairie Museum. He retired from provincial politics at dissolution of the Legislature in 2001.

Legislative Assembly of Alberta
Preceded by New District	MLA Grande Prairie Wapiti; 1993-2001	Succeeded by Gordon Graydon
