= Don Tannas =

Canadian politician (1938–2023)

MLA for Highwood
- In office March 20, 1989 – November 22, 2004
- Preceded by: Harry Alger
- Succeeded by: George Groeneveld

Personal details
- Born: April 25, 1938 Marwayne, Alberta, Canada
- Died: November 26, 2023 (aged 85) Calgary, Alberta, Canada
- Party: Progressive Conservative
- Children: Scott Tannas; Bruce Tannas

Donald Alfred Tannas (April 25, 1938 – November 26, 2023) was a Canadian provincial politician from Alberta. He served as a Member of the Alberta Legislature from 1989 until 2004. He was born in Marwayne, Alberta.

== Life and career ==
Tannas had a long history of being politically active. He ran for the Progressive Conservative nomination for Highwood in 1974 but lost to George Wolstenholme. He worked on the campaigns for Wolstenholme and later Harry Alger. He worked to fund-raise for the party and later served as President of the Highwood PC Association. After Alger announced his retirement, he ran for the PC nomination again in 1989 and won.

Tannas was first elected to the Alberta Legislature in the 1989 Alberta general election. He won a comfortable majority holding the Highwood electoral district for the Progressive Conservatives over Don Dearle of the Liberals and Janice Belgum of the New Democrats. He won his second term with a landslide majority in the 1993 Alberta general election defeating three other candidates. Tannas improved his plurality to sweep into office for a third term in the 1997 Alberta general election. Tannas won the biggest plurality of his political career taking almost 80% of the vote in the 2001 Alberta general election. He served as Deputy Speaker in his fourth term. He retired at the dissolution of the Assembly in 2004.

His son Scott Tannas was appointed to the Senate of Canada for the province of Alberta on March 25, 2013.

== Death ==
Don Tannas died at a hospital in Calgary on November 26, 2023, at the age of 85.

Legislative Assembly of Alberta
Preceded by Harry Alger	MLA Highwood; 1989–2004	Succeeded by George Groeneveld
