= Judy Gordon =

Canadian politician (1948–2020)

Judith Dawn Gordon (February 19, 1948 – December 1, 2020) was a provincial and municipal level politician from Alberta, Canada. She has served as a Member of the Legislative Assembly of Alberta, and as mayor of Lacombe.

== Provincial political career ==
Gordon ran for a seat in the Alberta Legislature after serving as mayor of Lacombe from 1989 to 1993. She won the new electoral district of Lacombe-Stettler in the 1993 Alberta general election winning easily defeating five other candidates to earn her first term in provincial office. She was elected to her second term in the 1997 Alberta general election. Her popular vote slightly decreased but she won her seat with a much bigger margin. Gordon was re-elected to a landslide winning her third term in office in the 2001 Alberta general election. She retired from her seat at dissolution in 2004 citing a hectic work schedule, the commute to Edmonton and redistribution of her electoral district.

== Mayor of Lacombe ==
Gordon had served her first term as mayor of Lacombe from 1989 to 1993 she left to run as a Member of the Alberta Legislature in 1993. She was elected to her second stint as mayor of Lacombe in the 2004 municipal election. She defeated incumbent mayor Bill McQuesten in a hotly contested three-way race winning by a plurality of 41 votes.

Gordon was elected to her third term by acclamation in the 2007 Lacombe municipal election.

She announced her retirement as mayor in 2010. Gordon died on December 1, 2020, at the age of 72.

Legislative Assembly of Alberta
Preceded by New District	MLA Lacombe-Stettler; 1993-2004	Succeeded by District Abolished
