= Richard Magnus =

Canadian politician (born 1950)

MLA for Calgary North Hill
- In office June 15, 1993 – March 3, 2008
- Preceded by: Fred Stewart
- Succeeded by: Kyle Fawcett

Personal details
- Born: July 30, 1950 (age 76) Goose Bay, Newfoundland and Labrador
- Party: Progressive Conservative Association of Alberta

Richard Magnus (born July 31, 1950) is a Canadian politician currently living in Alberta, Canada.

== Career ==
Magnus served as a municipal alderman for Calgary City Council representing Ward 4 from 1989 until his resignation in 1993. He was elected to the Legislative Assembly of Alberta in the 1993 Alberta general election to represent the Progressive Conservatives for Calgary North Hill. He served four terms in the legislature before declining to seek re-election in the 2008 election.

In 2001 he ran as a mayoral candidate in the 2001 Calgary municipal elections. He ended up finishing third in a hotly contested race, behind Dave Bronconnier and Bev Longstaff.

In late 2007, Magnus announced he would not seek reelection as an MLA in the next provincial election.
