= Jon Havelock =

Canadian politician

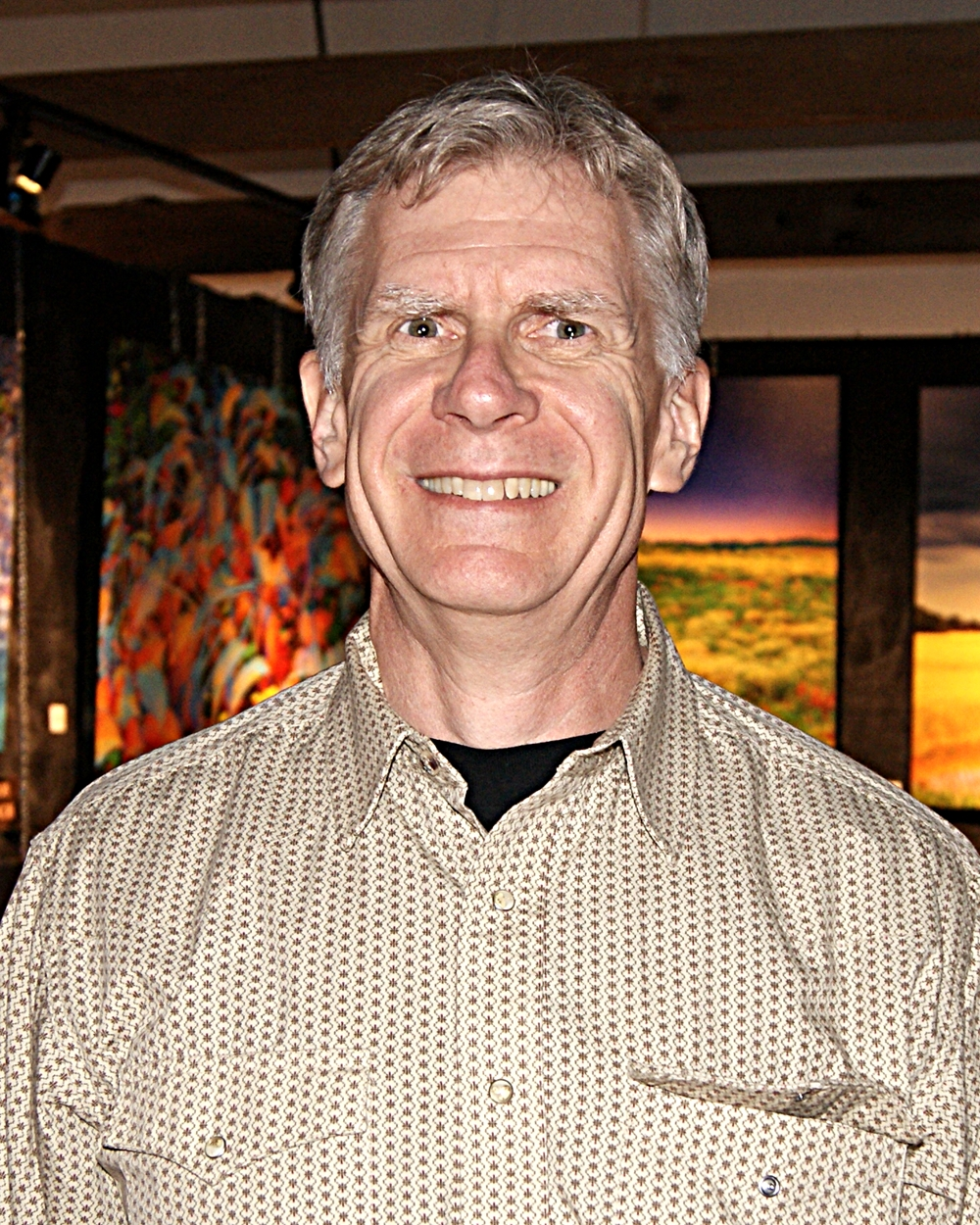
Jonathan Havelock in 2011

Jonathan Niles Havelock ECA is a former politician who served as an MLA and provincial Cabinet Minister from Alberta, Canada.

Jon Havelock was elected as the Progressive Conservative Association of Alberta member for Calgary Shaw in the 1993 Alberta general election after the former member of the riding Jim Dinning, switched ridings to Calgary Lougheed.

He was re-elected in 1997 and held the Justice Minister and Attorney General cabinet portfolios until 1999, when he moved to the Economic Development and Tourism portfolios. He retired from politics in 2001.

In addition to being a provincial MLA, Havelock has served on Calgary Municipal council as a school board trustee and an Alderman.

He currently serves as President of Strategic Relations Inc.

Legislative Assembly of Alberta
Preceded by Jim Dinning	MLA Calgary Shaw; 1993-2001	Succeeded by Cindy Ady
Political offices
Preceded by Leslie Pears	Calgary Alderman Ward 5; 1986-1988	Succeeded by Yvonne Fritz
