= Denis Herard =

Canadian politician (1944–2023)

The Honourable Denis Herard ECA

Member of the Legislative Assembly of Alberta
- In office 1993–2008
- Preceded by: David J. Carter
- Succeeded by: Jonathan Denis
- Constituency: Calgary-Egmont

Personal details
- Born: March 28, 1944 Edmonton, Alberta, Canada
- Died: September 6, 2023 (aged 79) Calgary, Alberta, Canada
- Party: Progressive Conservative Association of Alberta

Denis Herard ECA (March 28, 1944 – September 6, 2023) was a Canadian politician from Alberta who served as a Progressive Conservative Association of Alberta MLA for Calgary-Egmont. He was French-Canadian, with fore-fathers coming majorly from Quebec.

Herard was first elected to the Legislative Assembly of Alberta in the 1993 Alberta general election. He served four terms as a back bench MLA for the Progressive Conservatives. On April 6, 2006, Herard was sworn into the Executive Council of Alberta as the Minister of Advanced Education after Lyle Oberg was asked to leave caucus.

In late 2007, Herard announced he would not seek re-election in the next provincial election. He died on September 6, 2023, at the age of 79.
