= Ken Nicol =

Ken Nicol may refer to:

- Ken Nicol (musician) (born 1951), British guitar player, vocalist and songwriter
- Ken Nicol (politician) (born 1944), Canadian politician and academic
