= Rob Miyashiro =

Canadian politician

Rob Miyashiro MLA
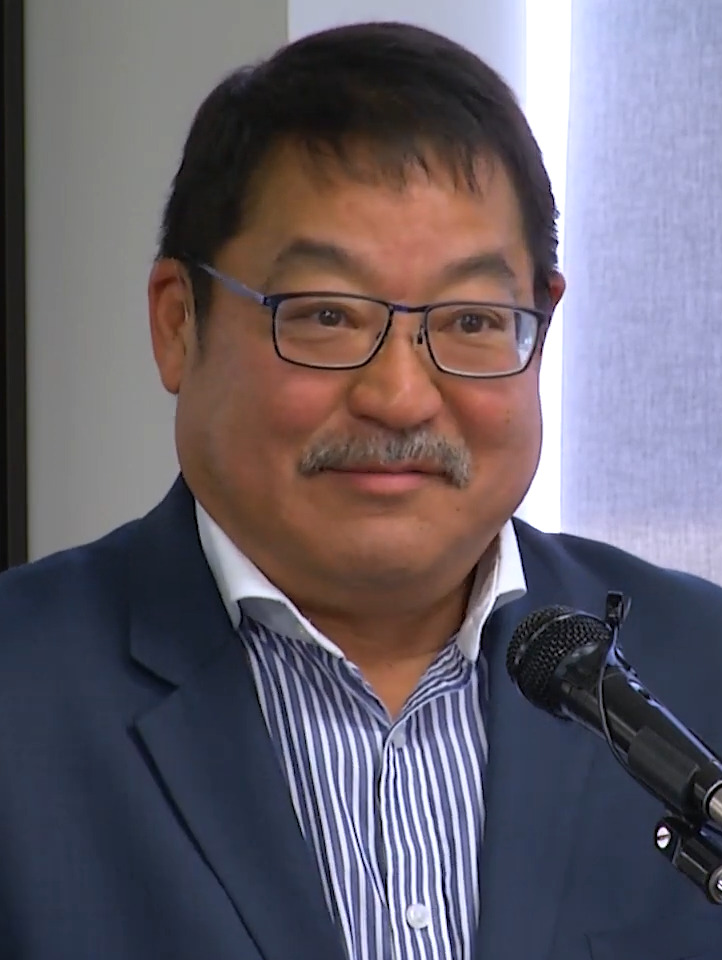
- Miyashiro in 2023

Member of the Legislative Assembly of Alberta for Lethbridge-West
- Incumbent
- Assumed office December 18, 2024
- Preceded by: Shannon Phillips

Lethbridge City Councillor
- In office October 28, 2013 – October 25, 2021

Personal details
- Born: March 19, 1962 (age 64) Lethbridge, Alberta, Canada
- Party: NDP (since 2021); Liberal (until 2012)
- Children: 3
- Education: University of Lethbridge
- Occupation: Executive director, politician

Robert Seiko Miyashiro MLA is a Canadian politician who was elected Member of the Legislative Assembly of Alberta for Lethbridge-West in 2024. A member of the Alberta New Democratic Party. He previously served as a member of the Lethbridge City Council from 2013 to 2021.

Miyashiro was a candidate for the Alberta NDP in the 2023 Alberta provincial election in the neighbouring riding of Lethbridge-East, where he lost to incumbent cabinet minister Nathan Neudorf by 636 votes. He also ran as a candidate for the Alberta Liberal Party in the 2012 Alberta general election in Lethbridge-East, coming in third place.

Prior to entering politics, Miyashiro worked in the human services sector for over 40 years, and was most recently the executive director of the Lethbridge Senior Citizens Organization.

== Personal life ==
Miyashiro is a third-generation Japanese-Canadian and Okinawan-Canadian. His mother was a school teacher and his father was a sheet metal worker. Miyashiro was born in Lethbridge and raised in nearby Taber, Alberta. He attended the University of Lethbridge.

== Electoral history ==
Alberta provincial by-election, Lethbridge-West: December 18, 2024: Lethbridge-West
| Party | Candidate | Votes | % | ±% |
|---|---|---|---|---|
| New Democratic | Rob Miyashiro | 7,239 | 53.4% | -0.5 |
| United Conservative | John Middleton-Hope | 6,089 | 44.9% | +2.4 |
| Alberta Party | Layton Veverka | 233 | 1.7% | -0.2 |
| Total valid votes | | 13,561 | | |
| Rejected, spoiled, and declined | | | | |
| Eligible electors | | 37,096 | -25.21% | |
| New Democratic hold | | Swing | | -0.5 |

2023 Alberta general election: Lethbridge-East
| Party | Candidate | Votes | % | ±% |
|---|---|---|---|---|
| United Conservative | Nathan Neudorf | 10,998 | 50.34 | -2.06 |
| New Democratic | Rob Miyashiro | 10,362 | 47.43 | +8.73 |
| Liberal | Helen McMenamin | 488 | 2.23 | -0.02 |
| Total | | 21,848 | 99.26 | – |
| Rejected and declined | | 163 | 0.74 | |
| Turnout | | 22,011 | 57.70 | |
| Eligible voters | | 38,150 | | |
| United Conservative hold | | Swing | | -5.40 |
Source(s) Source: Elections Alberta

2012 Alberta general election: Lethbridge-East
| Party | Candidate | Votes | % | ±% |
|---|---|---|---|---|
| Progressive Conservative | Bridget Pastoor | 6,599 | 40.95 | +1.74 |
| Wildrose | Kent Prestage | 5,146 | 31.93 | +25.71 |
| Liberal | Rob Miyashiro | 2,364 | 14.67 | -31.75 |
| New Democratic | Tom Moffatt | 2,007 | 12.45 | +6.74 |
| Total valid votes | | 16,116 | 99.00 | |
| Rejected, spoiled, and declined | | 163 | 1.00 | |
| Registered electors / turnout | | 31,817 | 51.16 | +15.79 |
| Progressive Conservative gain from Liberal | | Swing | | -11.99 |
Source(s) Elections Alberta. "Electoral Division Results - Lethbridge-East".
