= Pastoor =

Pastoor is a surname. Notable people with the surname include:

- Alex Pastoor (born 1966), Dutch football player and manager
- Bridget Pastoor (born 1940), Canadian politician
