= Shannon Phillips =

Canadian politician (born 1975)

The Honourable Shannon Phillips ECA

Critic, Finance
- In office May 13, 2019 – July 1, 2024
- Leader: Rachel Notley
- Succeeded by: Court Ellingson

Minister of Environment and Parks of Alberta
- In office May 24, 2015 – April 30, 2019
- Premier: Rachel Notley
- Preceded by: Kyle Fawcett
- Succeeded by: Jason Nixon

Member of the Legislative Assembly of Alberta for Lethbridge-West
- In office May 5, 2015 – July 1, 2024
- Preceded by: Greg Weadick
- Succeeded by: Rob Miyashiro

Personal details
- Born: September 4, 1975 (age 51)
- Party: Alberta New Democratic Party
- Children: 2
- Education: University of Alberta
- Occupation: economic policy analyst, journalist, consultant
- Portfolio: Minister of Environment & Minister for the Status of Women

Shannon Rosella Phillips ECA (born September 4, 1975) is a Canadian politician who was elected in the 2015, 2019, and 2023 Alberta general elections to represent the electoral district of Lethbridge-West in the 29th, 30th, and 31st Alberta Legislatures, respectively. She is a member of the Alberta New Democratic Party. During the NDP government of 2015–2019, she served as Minister of Environment and Parks, Minister Responsible for the Status of Women, Minister Responsible for Climate Change and as the Deputy Government House Leader. Phillips resigned as an MLA effective July 1, 2024.

== Personal life ==
Phillips' mother was a physics teacher in Spruce Grove, where Phillips grew up with her parents and younger sister. Phillips graduated from the University of Alberta with a Bachelor of Arts degree in political science with honours in 1999 and with a Master of Arts in 2002.

Phillips is an economic policy analyst who worked for the Alberta Federation of Labour for five years prior to political life, where she did much work on energy and environment-related matters. She also served as chair of the group Womanspace Lethbridge for five years. Phillips is an activist, a feminist, and is in favour of organized labour. Phillips organized her first protest at age 17, which was successful in fighting Spruce Grove's curfew imposed on teenagers.

Phillips played roller derby for the Deathbridge Derby Dames team as Gnome Stompsky, an homage to American political writer and activist Noam Chomsky. Her derby number, 4746, reflects the number of votes she received when she ran unsuccessfully for the Alberta NDP in the 2012 provincial election, her first campaign. Phillips is conversational in French and is a mother of two sons.

== Career ==
In 2000, Phillips worked on Brian Mason's by-election campaign in Edmonton-Highlands-Norwood. She was a University of Alberta political science grad interning in the office of Brian Mason and worked as a communication aide during the early years Ralph Klein was premier of Alberta.

=== Member of the Alberta Legislature ===
Phillips previously ran in the 2012 general election, losing to Progressive Conservative (PC) incumbent Greg Weadick. She came second by approximately seven percentage points, taking 30 percent of the votes.

Phillips was successful in the 2015 general election, defeating Greg Weadick by almost 30%. Until then, since 1975, the Lethbridge-West district had been electing a PC MLA, mostly by plurality. On May 24, 2015, she was sworn in as the Minister of Environment and Parks and Minister Responsible for the Status of Women in the Alberta Cabinet. After the United Conservative Party formed government in 2019, she was succeeded by Jason Nixon and Leela Aheer. She also served as Minister Responsible for Climate Change and as the Deputy Government House Leader.

In opposition, she served in critic roles, including finance. She was also re-elected as an MLA in 2019 general election and 2023. Phillips resigned as an MLA effective July 1, 2024, having opted out of the Alberta New Democrats leadership race following the retirement of Rachel Notley as leader, believing that she had accomplished enough in politics, had unnamed opportunities in the private sector and wanted to spend more time with her two teenage sons. The provincial by-election to replace her was held in December 2024.

=== Outside politics ===
On August 21, 2024, she announced she would be joining the University of Lethbridge Department of Political Science as Adjunct Faculty at the start of the Fall 2024 term. She is also a partner with Meredith, Boessenkool and Phillips Policy Advisors.

=== Policy advocacy ===
Phillips has advocated on numerous issues, including Indigenous land claims, consultation and relations, climate change, human rights, technology industry programs (artificial intelligence strategy), renewable energy procurement, support for small and local breweries, public service wages and women's economic equality. Phillips is an advocate for labour relations and bargaining rights. Phillips is an advocate for the Water Act, which protects Water Act license holders to first-in-time, first-in-right system that protects investments in irrigation, a benefit to farmers. Phillips has been advocating for Lethbridge's Supervised injection site (Safe Consumption Site) to expand for safe intox and detox support, as well as supportive housing.

Shannon Phillips and Premier Rachel Notley released a climate change policy plan in 2015, which included a carbon price to be $30 per tonne by 2018, coal-fired power plants to be phased out by 2030, emissions from oil sands to be capped at 100 megatonnes per year, methane emissions to be reduced by 45% by 2025 in the oil & gas sector, and 30% of all electricity to be renewable generated by 2030. Phillips' first act as Environment Minister was to ensure quality oil sands monitoring and that the chief scientist that is in charge of the report makes it public, and not to the Minister.

In the early days of the United Conservative Party (UCP) government that displaced the NDP's government at the 2019 Alberta general election, Phillips spoke against Bill 1 - The Act to Repeal the Carbon Tax. Phillips spoke and voted against Bill 8, which she and others gave the sarcastic nickname "Bill Hate".

Phillips is an ally to the LGBTQ+ community and has spoken for and the protection of LGBTQ+ rights and freedoms, as she has strongly voted against the UCP Bill 8 - The Education Amendment Act, which would remove protections for LGBTQ+ youth from being outed by school staff or administration whenever a child joins a gay–straight alliance (GSA). Phillips recalls growing up in a homophobic community where her peer confided in her their fears of being killed if the public were to fight out that they were gay, which greatly influenced Phillips' advocacy for GSAs.

== In the news ==
On June 24, 2016, the Wildrose Party (Note: The Wildrose and Progressive Conservative Association of Alberta merged to form the United Conservative Party on October 28, 2017.) said during question period that Phillips' editorial work for a 2004 book by Greenpeace activist Mike Hudema, entitled An Action a Day Keeps Global Capitalism Away, would "make the business and industrial sectors even more jittery about the agenda of the new NDP government." Phillips, who wrote the foreword and did some copy editing, said she did not contribute to the content.

On January 8, 2018, Phillips was in the news because of a Tweet, which Phillips said was sent by her assistant, in support of a Green Challenge by Environment Lethbridge, in which the Lethbridge organization called on all Albertans to undertake five actions for 30 days from January 15 through February 15. This included "unplugging electronics, refraining from idling vehicles, using reusable shopping bags, reducing shower time, and going meatless for one day each week." Rich Smith, executive director of Alberta Beef Producers, said that Environment Lethbridge's Green Challenge which suggested eating less meat was clearly done with "good intentions" but was misinformed as "going meatless for one day a week" would not "reduce people's environmental impact substantially."

On January 5, 2019, following alleged bullying and intimidation of the proposed Bighorn Wildland Provincial Park supporters, Minister Phillips issued a statement announcing that public consultations that were planned for Drayton Valley, Edmonton, Red Deer, and Sundre, would be cancelled and with announcements of alternative consultations. The proposed region, situated between Banff National Park and Jasper National Park, would provide a vast and critical wildlife corridor for numerous wildlife species, including sensitive species, such as bull trout (Alberta's provincial fish), wolverine, and grizzly bears, that would extend from Yellowstone National Park in Wyoming in the south to the Yukon in Northern Canada. According to a January 7, 2019 article in The Globe and Mail, some residents of Rocky Mountain House, a town of 7,000, led by UCP Member of the Legislative Assembly of Alberta (MLA) for Rimbey-Rocky Mountain House-Sundre, Jason Nixon, oppose the creation of the park. Nixon has made unfounded claims that the plan is a "foreign-funded plot to wall off the back country to Albertans who call the region home".

In January 2019, Phillips was criticized in the media for misleading Albertans, alleging the Royal Canadian Mounted Police advised her to cancel public consultations when no such advisement occurred. • In regards to Phillips' remarks, RCMP spokesman Fraser Logan issued a written statement via email, stating: “Alberta RCMP did not provide any official advice to Alberta Environment and Parks regarding the Bighorn public consultations.” Logan stated, “We can confirm we have been contacted by some members of the public who wanted the police to be aware of some concerning social media interactions around the Bighorn public consultation,” said the RCMP. “Alberta RCMP can confirm that we do not have any ongoing investigations relating to the consultations.”

On October 1, 2019, reporter Carrie Tait of The Globe and Mail reported that families of the athletes involved in the Humboldt Broncos bus crash in 2018 are urging the (UCP) not to ease training standards for semi-truck drivers. According to reporting, Minister Devin Dreeshen and Premier Jason Kenney indicated their support for relaxing those training standards for semi-truck drivers in some sectors including farmers. Ryan Straschnitzki, a player who was paralyzed in the crash, has since praised the new training standards and called for higher standards instead of lower standards, saying "The better the safety, the more lives that can be saved.” Toby Boulet, a leading voice among the parents of the players in the crash for increased training standards, said "I would love to hear Mr Devin Dreeshen's views and the views of any other[s] who are placing the value of a truck full of grain over my son’s life." Phillips sided with the players and their families, saying, "It is unfortunate that Jason Kenney doesn’t care about the perspective of family members of the Humboldt Broncos... There has got to be a way for him to address those safety concerns rather than throwing them out in the name of a red tape fantasy.”

In July 2020, two members of the Lethbridge Police Service were demoted for inappropriately using their police jobs in 2017 to follow and photograph Phillips, then the Minister of Environment and Parks of Alberta. Phillips was in the process of meeting with stakeholders in the lead-up to the formation of Castle Provincial Park, where the two officers had an interest in off-road vehicle driving. One of the officers took photos of the meeting and ran a police check on the stakeholder; the photo was later published on Facebook under a pseudonym alongside criticism of the NDP government. After an investigation by the Medicine Hat Police Service, charges were laid against the two officers, who admitted to the misconduct charges.

In 2025, Phillips stated that she would support the federal Liberal Party candidate in her riding of Lethbridge. Ahead of the 2026 federal NDP leadership election, she endorsed Heather McPherson and emerged as a critic of Avi Lewis.

== Electoral history ==
=== 2023 general election ===
2023 Alberta general election: Lethbridge-West
Party	Candidate	Votes	%	±%
New Democratic	Shannon Phillips	12,082	53.92	+8.70
United Conservative	Cheryl Seaborn	9,525	42.51	-1.78
Alberta Party	Braham Luddu	425	1.90	-5.34
Liberal	Pat Chizek	375	1.67	-0.21
Total		22,407	98.99	–
Rejected, spoiled and declined		228	1.01	+0.42
Turnout		22,635	61.77	-7.01
Eligible voters		36,642		
New Democratic hold		Swing		+5.24
Source(s) Source: Elections Alberta

=== 2019 general election ===
2019 Alberta general election: Lethbridge-West
Party	Candidate	Votes	%	±%
New Democratic	Shannon Phillips	11,016	45.22	-14.12
United Conservative	Karri Flatla	10,790	44.29	+7.01
Alberta Party	Zac Rhodenizer	1,763	7.24	--
Liberal	Patricia Chizek	460	1.89	-1.49
Independence	Ben Maddison	332	1.36	--
Total valid votes		24,361	99.42	
Rejected, spoiled, and declined		143	0.58	-0.37
Turnout		24,504	68.79	+13.26
Eligible voters		35,623		
New Democratic hold		Swing		-10.57
Source(s) Elections Alberta. "Electoral Division Results - Lethbridge-West".

=== 2015 general election ===
2015 Alberta general election: Lethbridge-West
Party	Candidate	Votes	%	±%
New Democratic	Shannon Phillips	11,114	59.34	+29.40
Progressive Conservative	Greg Weadick	3,938	20.97	-15.69
Wildrose	Ron Bain	3,063	16.31	-10.41
Liberal	Sheila Pyne	634	3.38	-2.18
Total valid votes		18,779	99.05	
Rejected, spoiled, and declined		181	0.95	-0.08
Registered electors / turnout		34,146	55.53	+0.81
New Democratic gain from Progressive Conservative		Swing		+22.54
Source(s) Elections Alberta. "Electoral Division Results - Lethbridge-West".

=== 2012 general election ===
2012 Alberta general election: Lethbridge-West
Party	Candidate	Votes	%	±%
Progressive Conservative	Greg Weadick	5,810	36.66	-7.03
New Democratic	Shannon Phillips	4,746	29.95	+19.65
Wildrose	Kevin Kinahan	4,235	26.72	+19.25
Liberal	Bal Boora	881	5.56	-29.57
Alberta Party	David Walters	177	1.12	–
Total valid votes		15,849	98.97	
Rejected, spoiled, and declined		165	1.03	+0.62
Turnout		16,014	54.72	+20.84
Eligible voters		29,267		
Progressive Conservative hold		Swing		-13.34
Source(s) Elections Alberta. "Electoral Division Results - Lethbridge-West".
