= 2024 Lethbridge-West provincial by-election =

Provincial by-election in Alberta, Canada

- December 18, 2024

Seat of Lethbridge-West
- Turnout: 36.06% ▼25.71pp
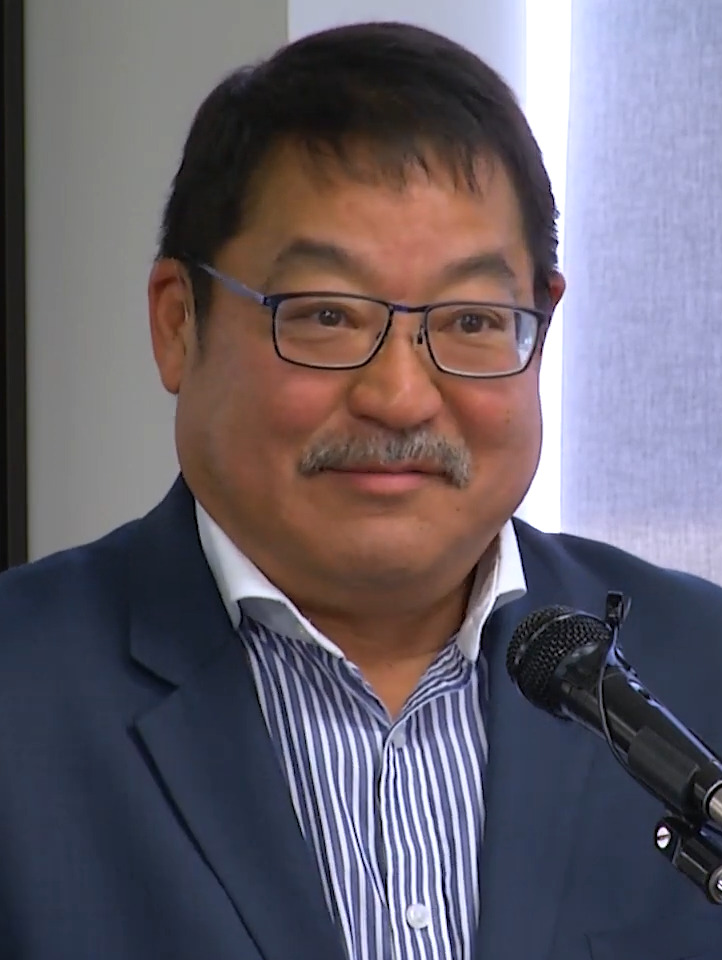
	First party	Second party
		UCP
Candidate	Rob Miyashiro	John Middleton-Hope
Party	New Democratic	United Conservative
Popular vote	7,238	6,093
Percentage	53.35%	44.91%
Swing	▼0.57pp	▲2.40pp
MLA before election
Shannon Phillips
New Democratic
Elected MLA
Rob Miyashiro
New Democratic

The 2024 Lethbridge-West provincial by-election was held on December 18, 2024 following the resignation of New Democratic Party (NDP) member of the Legislative Assembly of Alberta Shannon Phillips. The NDP successfully held onto the seat.

== Background ==
Shannon Phillips represented the constituency since 2015. She resigned her seat in summer 2024 citing family reasons. Premier Danielle Smith called the by-election on November 20, scheduling it for December 18. Voting stations were opened on December 18 with official results announced on December 28.

== Candidates ==
The NDP candidate was Rob Miyashiro, who served on Lethbridge City Council from 2013 to 2021, and contested Lethbridge-East in the 2023 Alberta general election.

The United Conservative Party (UCP) candidate was Lethbridge city councillor John Middleton-Hope. He is a former police officer and Lethbridge police chief. He beat Erin Leclerc and Shauna Gruninger in the nomination race.

== Campaign ==
Issues in the by-election include healthcare, pensions and affordable housing.

== Results ==
Alberta provincial by-election, Lethbridge-West: December 18, 2024: Lethbridge-West
Party	Candidate	Votes	%	±%
New Democratic	Rob Miyashiro	7,238	53.35	-0.57
United Conservative	John Middleton-Hope	6,093	44.91	+2.40
Alberta Party	Layton Veverka	237	1.75	-0.15
Total valid votes		13,568	99.46	-
Rejected, spoiled, and declined		74	0.54	-0.47
Turnout		13,642	36.06	-25.71
Eligible voters		37,828		
New Democratic hold		Swing		-1.49
Source(s) Source: Elections Alberta

== 2023 result ==
2023 Alberta general election: Lethbridge-West
Party	Candidate	Votes	%	±%
New Democratic	Shannon Phillips	12,082	53.92	+8.70
United Conservative	Cheryl Seaborn	9,525	42.51	-1.78
Alberta Party	Braham Luddu	425	1.90	-5.34
Liberal	Pat Chizek	375	1.67	-0.21
Total		22,407	98.99	–
Rejected, spoiled and declined		228	1.01	+0.42
Turnout		22,635	61.77	-7.01
Eligible voters		36,642		
New Democratic hold		Swing		+5.24
Source(s) Source: Elections Alberta

== See also ==
- List of Alberta by-elections
