= Weadick =

Weadick is a surname. Notable people with the surname include:

- Greg Weadick (born 1954), Canadian politician in Alberta
- Guy Weadick (1885-1953), Canadian-American cowboy actor
