= Nathan Neudorf =

Canadian politician

The Honourable Nathan Neudorf ECA MLA
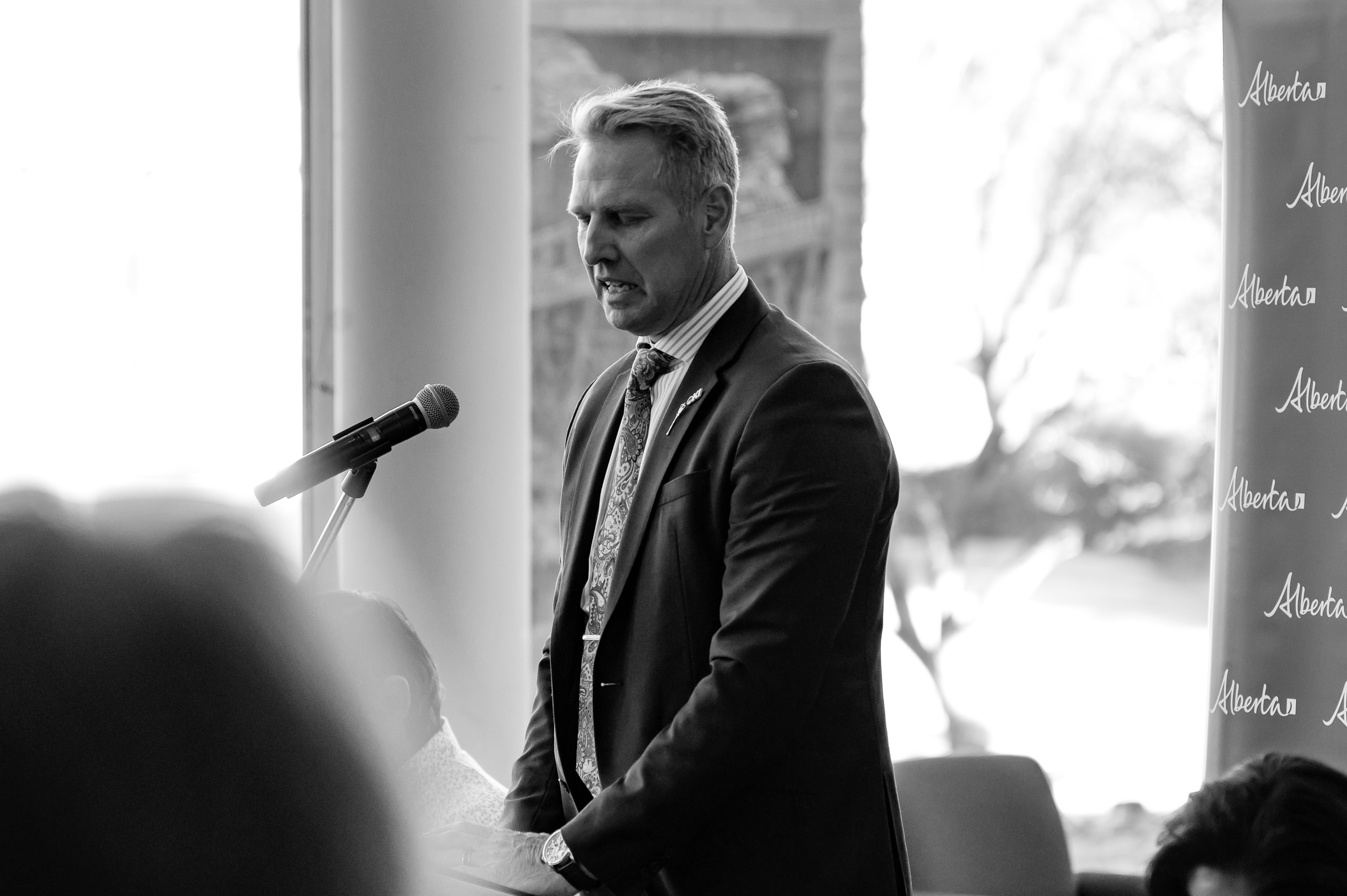
- Neudorf in 2020

Minister of Assisted Living and Social Services
- Incumbent
- Assumed office May 21, 2026
- Premier: Danielle Smith
- Preceded by: Jason Nixon

Minister of Affordability and Utilities
- In office June 9, 2023 – May 21, 2026
- Premier: Danielle Smith
- Preceded by: Matt Jones
- Succeeded by: RJ Sigurdson

Deputy Premier of Alberta
- In office October 24, 2022 – June 9, 2023 Serving with Kaycee Madu
- Premier: Danielle Smith
- Preceded by: Sarah Hoffman (2016)
- Succeeded by: Mike Ellis

Minister of Infrastructure
- In office October 24, 2022 – June 9, 2023
- Premier: Danielle Smith
- Preceded by: Nicholas Milliken
- Succeeded by: Peter Guthrie

Member of the Legislative Assembly of Alberta for Lethbridge-East
- Incumbent
- Assumed office April 16, 2019
- Preceded by: Maria Fitzpatrick

Personal details
- Party: United Conservative Party
- Occupation: Businessman

Nathan Neudorf ECA MLA is a Canadian politician who has served as the Minister of Assisted Living and Community Supports of Alberta since 2026. He was elected in the 2019 Alberta general election to represent the electoral district of Lethbridge-East in the 30th Alberta Legislature. Neudorf was previously deputy premier from 2022 to 2023.

== Political career ==
Neudorf originally sought the UCP nomination in Livingstone-Macleod in 2019 but came second to Roger Reid who went on to be elected for that riding. Neudorf then sough the UCP nomination in Lethbridge-East ultimately becoming the UCP candidate. He was elected as the Lethbridge-East MLA in 2019.

As MLA, Neudorf supported the $3,384,900 provincial contribution to the Lethbridge housing project for Indigenous women. A 64-unit seniors’ community also opened in Lethbridge with Neudorf speaking of how there had been a problem with seniors’ housing for some time in the city and hoped the $15.8 million facility would help address that.

On February 4, 2022, Neudorf wrote an open letter calling for an end to the restriction exception program implemented by the provincial government in response to COVID-19. Neudorf described how he had received over 3000 calls, emails and messages from concerned Albertans throughout the province about the restrictions. Less than a week later the provincial government removed the restriction exemption program, being part of their step 1 approach of reopening.

Besides being deputy premier, he had also been Minister of Infrastructure and Parliamentary Secretary for Multiculturalism. Neudorf also was Vice-Chair of the Building Communities Cabinet Policy Committee and was active on the Treasury Board Committee as well as the Emergency Management Cabinet Committee. Previously Neudorf was on a variety of other committees including the Special Standing Committee on Members’ Services, Standing Committee on Alberta’s Economic Future, Standing Committee on Privileges and Elections, Standing Orders and Printing, Select Special Public Health Act Review Committee, Special Standing Committee on Members’ Services, Standing Committee on Families and Communities, Standing Committee on Private Bills and Private Members’ Public Bills as well as Standing Committee on Public Accounts.

Part of Neudorf’s focus was infrastructure, providing $6.508 billion to municipal infrastructure, $3.542 billion to capital maintenance and renewal, and $3.1 billion to health care services. Minister Neudorf said “Over the next three years, Alberta’s government is investing $23 billion into public infrastructure through the 2023 Capital Plan. By building and revitalizing hospitals, schools, courthouses and other public facilities, we are investing in the critical infrastructure projects that Albertans need and help keep people working”.

Neudorf supported Danielle Smith in the 2022 United Conservative Party leadership election.

He narrowly won re-election in the 2023 Alberta general election in Lethbridge-East over the NDP's Rob Miyashiro, a former Lethbridge city councillor. He later became Minister of Affordability and Utilities.

A recall petition against Neudorf was approved by Elections Alberta on November 14, 2025. Signature collection runs from November 26, 2025, to February 23, 2026, requiring 13,207 signatures.

== Personal life ==
Neudorf has four daughters and one son. Before being elected Neudorf spent much of his life working in the construction industry, serving on a variety of boards within the field. Neudorf and his wife Deanne live with their five children in Lethbridge.

== Electoral history ==
=== 2023 general election ===
2023 Alberta general election: Lethbridge-East
Party	Candidate	Votes	%	±%
United Conservative	Nathan Neudorf	10,998	50.34	-2.06
New Democratic	Rob Miyashiro	10,362	47.43	+8.73
Liberal	Helen McMenamin	488	2.23	-0.02
Total		21,848	99.26	–
Rejected and declined		163	0.74	
Turnout		22,011	57.70	
Eligible voters		38,150		
United Conservative hold		Swing		-5.40
Source(s) Source: Elections Alberta

=== 2019 general election ===
2019 Alberta general election: Lethbridge-East
Party	Candidate	Votes	%	±%
United Conservative	Nathan Neudorf	11,883	52.40	+6.28
New Democratic	Maria Fitzpatrick	8,775	38.70	-8.79
Alberta Party	Ally Taylor	1,054	4.65	--
Liberal	Devon Hargreaves	512	2.26	-4.14
Independence	John W. McCanna	453	2.00	--
Total valid votes		22,677	99.20	
Rejected, spoiled, and declined		183	0.80	+0.38
Turnout		22,860	66.91	+13.36
Eligible voters		34,167		
United Conservative gain from New Democratic		Swing		+7.54
Source(s) Elections Alberta. "Electoral Division Results - Lethbridge-East".
