= Maurice Tougas =

Canadian politician

MLA for Edmonton-Meadowlark
- In office 2004–2008
- Preceded by: Bob Maskell
- Succeeded by: Raj Sherman

Personal details
- Born: February 19, 1956 (age 70) Edmonton, Alberta, Canada
- Party: Liberal
- Occupation: journalist

Maurice Tougas (born February 19, 1956) is a Canadian politician, who formerly represented the electoral district of Edmonton Meadowlark in the Legislative Assembly of Alberta. He is a member of the Liberal Party. He was first elected in the 2004 election, when he defeated incumbent Progressive Conservative Bob Maskell, but did not seek re-election at the conclusion of his term.

Before entering politics, Tougas wrote a weekly column for the Edmonton Examiner. He resigned from this position when he declared his candidacy in 2004, in order to avoid any conflicts of interest. He was a columnist and editor for the Edmonton alternative weekly SEE magazine until the magazine ceased publication in 2011.

Tougas' 2004 campaign was distinguished by being one of the lowest budget successful campaigns in recent provincial election history, spending less than $5400.
