= 2011 Alberta Liberal Party leadership election =

- September 10, 2011
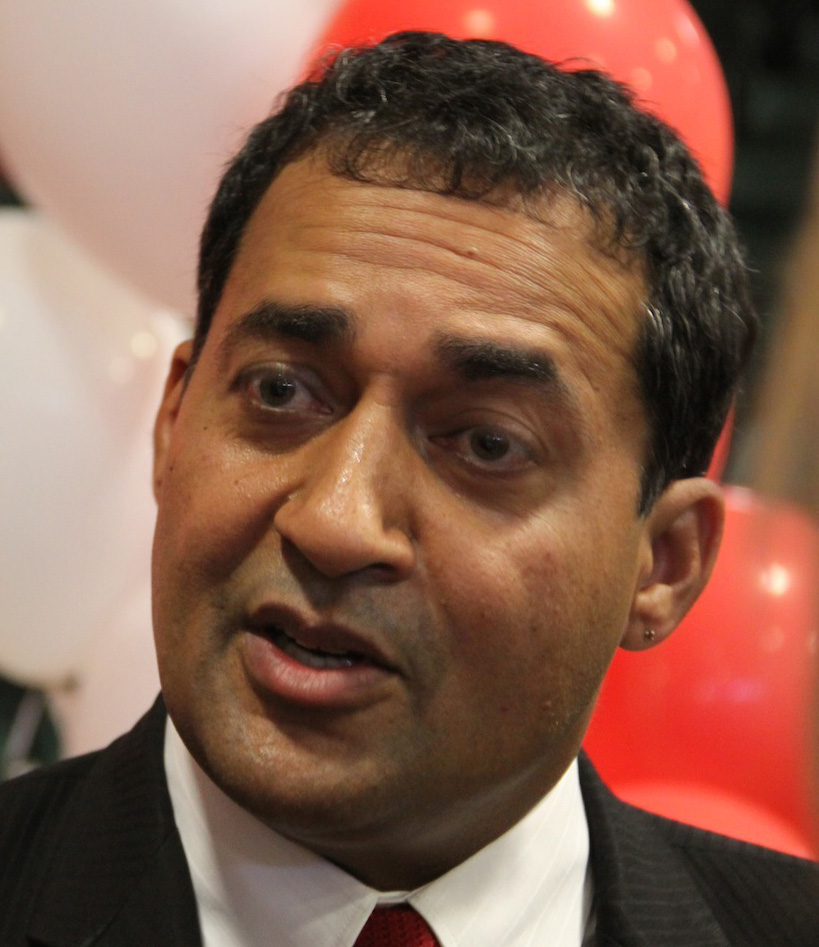

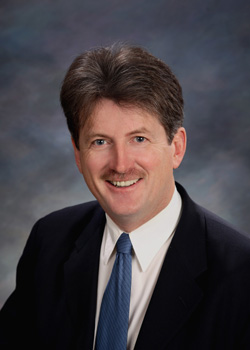

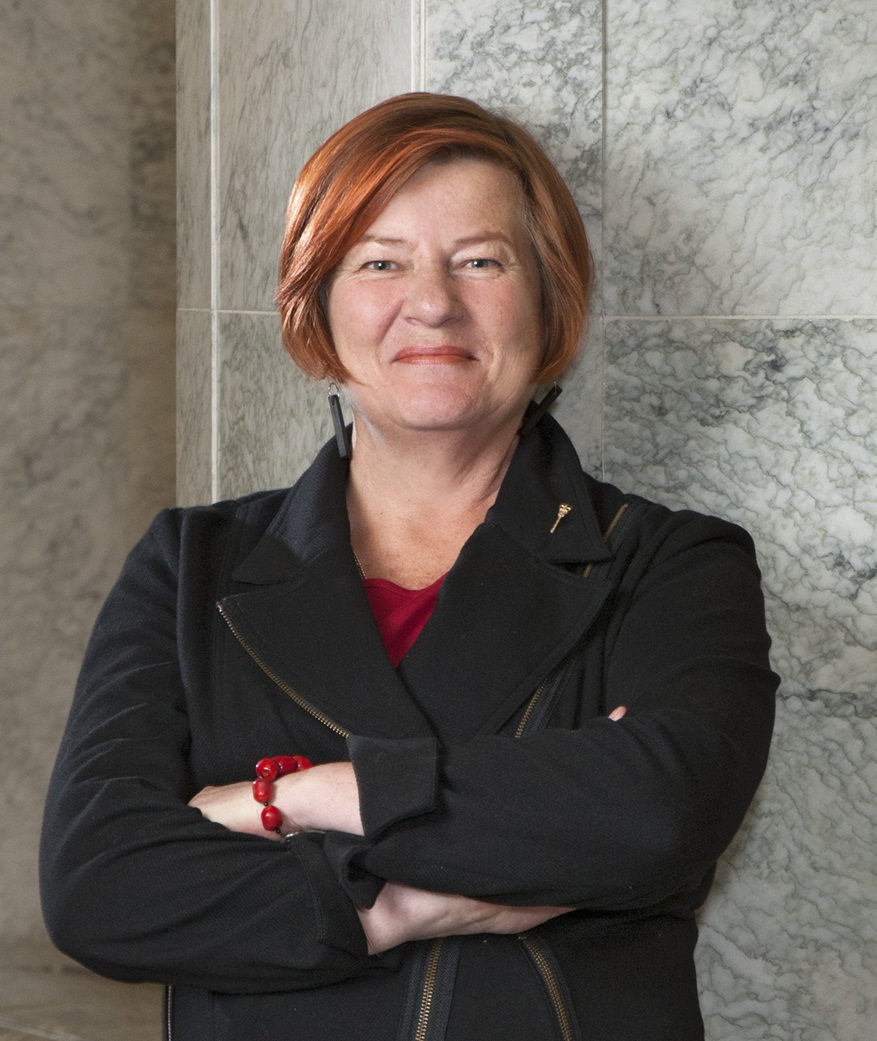
Candidate	Raj Sherman	Hugh MacDonald	Laurie Blakeman
Party	Liberal	Liberal	Liberal
Popular vote	4,684	2,239	854
Percentage	54%	26%	9%
Candidate	Bill Harvey	Bruce Payne
Party	Liberal	Liberal
Popular vote	626	197
Percentage	7%	2%
Leader before election
David Swann
Elected Leader
Raj Sherman

2011 Alberta Liberal Party leadership election
- Date: September 10, 2011
- Resigning leader: David Swann
- Won by: Raj Sherman
- Ballots: 1
- Candidates: 5

An election for the leadership of the Alberta Liberal Party was held on September 10, 2011, which was caused by David Swann's announcement on February 1, 2011, of his intention to resign as leader. The election is the party's second since the 2008 election. MLA Raj Sherman was elected on the first ballot. An open nomination system was used in which any Albertan could vote in the election, even if they were not party members.

Because of a Progressive Conservative leadership election, the PCs elected a new leader on October 1, 2011. The media were speculating that the new PC leader, who would become Premier, may call a snap election rather than wait until 2013. This did not come to fruition, however, and Alison Redford stated that a general election would be held in the spring.

== Timeline ==
- February 1: David Swann announces his resignation
- May 28–29: Liberal Party General Convention
- August 1: Close of nominations
- September 10: Polling and leadership announcement

== Candidates ==
At the close of nominations, there were five candidates for leader:

- Laurie Blakeman, MLA
- Bill Harvey
- Hugh MacDonald, MLA
- Bruce Payne, a Calgary businessman
- Raj Sherman, MLA

== Results ==
Candidate	Votes	Percentage
Raj Sherman	4,684	54%
Hugh MacDonald	2,239	26%
Laurie Blakeman	854	9%
Bill Harvey	626	7%
Bruce Payne	197	2%
Total	8,640	
