= John Victor Anderson =

Canadian politician

Member of the Legislative Assembly of Alberta
- In office 1971–1975
- Preceded by: New district
- Succeeded by: Archibald Johnston
- Constituency: Lethbridge-East

Personal details
- Born: John Victor Prunkle; August 14, 1918 Medicine Hat, Alberta
- Died: December 31, 1982 (aged 64)
- Party: Social Credit
- Occupation: politician

John Victor Anderson (August 8, 1918 – December 31, 1982) was a provincial level politician from Alberta, Canada. He served as a member of the Legislative Assembly of Alberta from 1971 to 1975 sitting with the Social Credit caucus in the official opposition.

== Political career ==
Anderson ran for a seat to the Alberta Legislature in the 1971 Alberta general election. He ran in the new electoral district of Lethbridge-East as a candidate for the Social Credit party and faced two other candidates. Anderson won the race by a comfortable margin to pick up the district for Social Credit who was defeated from government in that election. Anderson faced a strong challenge by Progressive Conservative candidate Richard Barton but still beat him by almost a thousand votes.

Anderson ran for a second term in the 1975 Alberta general election. He faced three other candidates and finished second after his popular vote collapsed. He was defeated in a landslide by Archibald Johnston, losing his seat by over 5000 votes.
