= Maria Fitzpatrick =

Canadian politician

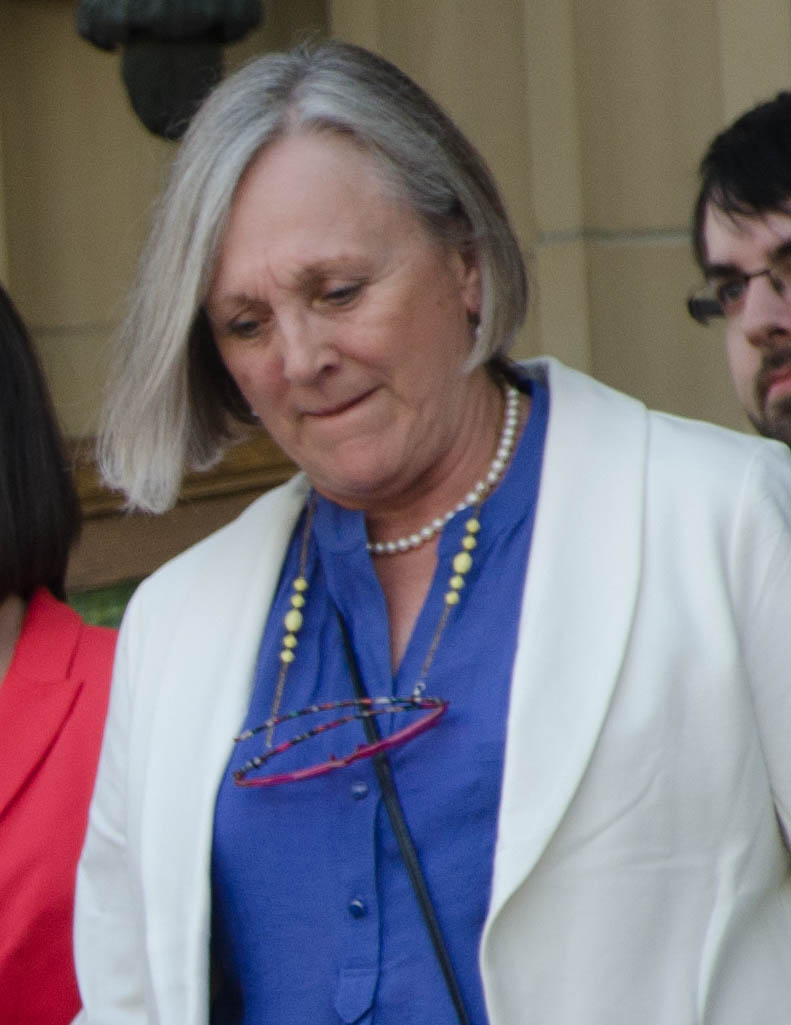
- Fitzpatrick in May 2015

Member of the Legislative Assembly of Alberta for Lethbridge-East
- In office May 5, 2015 – March 19, 2019
- Preceded by: Bridget Pastoor
- Succeeded by: Nathan Neudorf

Personal details
- Born: February 18, 1949 (age 77) St. John's, Newfoundland and Labrador
- Party: Alberta New Democratic Party
- Occupation: Corrections officer, athlete

Maria Michelle Fitzpatrick (born February 18, 1949) is a Canadian politician who was elected in the 2015 Alberta general election to the Legislative Assembly of Alberta representing the electoral district of Lethbridge-East.

== Early life ==
Fitzpatrick was born and raised in St. John's, Newfoundland and Labrador. She is a former sprinter who competed in the Canada Summer Games, Canadian Track and Field Championships, National University Indoor Championships, Halifax Highland Games, Antigonish Highland Games, and Royal Canadian Legion Provincial Championships. In 1969, she was named the Athlete of the Year for St. John's. She later coached various track and field teams in the Yukon, Northwest Territories, and Alberta. In 2005, she was named to the Newfoundland and Labrador Athletics Association Hall of Fame. Fitzpatrick is a trustee on the Lethbridge Labour Council, vice president of the Canadian Federation of University Women, and chair of the regional women's committee of the Public Service Alliance of Canada. She worked for 32 years with the Correctional Service of Canada, most recently as a project officer.

== Political career ==
In November 2015, during debate on a private member's bill to improve supports for victims of domestic violence, Fitzpatrick spoke in the legislature about her own experience, having been married to an abusive husband in the 1970s. She earned a standing ovation in the legislature for her speech, and the bill unanimously passed second reading soon afterward.

== Electoral history ==
=== 2019 general election ===
2019 Alberta general election: Lethbridge-East
Party	Candidate	Votes	%	±%
United Conservative	Nathan Neudorf	11,883	52.40	+6.28
New Democratic	Maria Fitzpatrick	8,775	38.70	-8.79
Alberta Party	Ally Taylor	1,054	4.65	--
Liberal	Devon Hargreaves	512	2.26	-4.14
Independence	John W. McCanna	453	2.00	--
Total valid votes		22,677	99.20	
Rejected, spoiled, and declined		183	0.80	+0.38
Turnout		22,860	66.91	+13.36
Eligible voters		34,167		
United Conservative gain from New Democratic		Swing		+7.54
Source(s) Elections Alberta. "Electoral Division Results - Lethbridge-East".

=== 2015 general election ===
2015 Alberta general election: Lethbridge-East
Party	Candidate	Votes	%	±%
New Democratic	Maria Fitzpatrick	8,918	47.49	+35.04
Progressive Conservative	Tammy Perlich	4,743	25.26	-15.69
Wildrose	Kent Prestage	3,918	20.86	-11.07
Liberal	Bill West	1,201	6.40	-8.27
Total valid votes		18,780	99.58	
Rejected, spoiled, and declined		80	0.42	-0.58
Registered electors / turnout		35,224	53.54	+2.38
New Democratic gain from Progressive Conservative		Swing		+25.37
Source(s) Elections Alberta. "Electoral Division Results - Lethbridge-East".
