= Lethbridge-West =

Provincial electoral district in Alberta, Canada

Coordinates: 49.7°N 112.8°W

Alberta electoral district
- Lethbridge-West within the City of Lethbridge, 2017 boundaries

Provincial electoral district
- Legislature: Legislative Assembly of Alberta
MLA
Rob Miyashiro
New Democratic
- District created: 1971
- First contested: 1971
- Last contested: 2024 by-election

Demographics
- Census division: Division No. 2
- Census subdivision: Lethbridge

Lethbridge-West is an Alberta provincial electoral district, covering the western half of the city of Lethbridge, including all of West Lethbridge. Under the Alberta electoral boundary re-distribution of 2004, 13 Street forms most of the dividing line between Lethbridge-East and Lethbridge West. Scenic Drive and 16 Avenue South form a small part of the boundary. Clockwise from Lethbridge-East, the constituency is bounded at the city limits by Taber-Warner, by Cardston-Siksika and then again by Taber-Warner.

The Member of the Legislative Assembly for this district is New Democrat Rob Miyashiro.

== History ==
The electoral district was created in the 1971 boundary redistribution from the old electoral district of Lethbridge when it was split in half. It also took in territory from the riding of Macleod from west of the Oldman River.

The 2010 boundary redistribution made some minor revisions to equalize the population between West and East. North of St. Edward Blvd the boundary was pushed west from 13 Street to Stafford Drive.

=== Boundary history ===
65 Lethbridge-East 2003 boundaries
Bordering districts
North	East	West	South
Little Bow	Lethbridge-East	Livingstone-Macleod	Little Bow
riding map goes here		map in relation to other districts in Alberta goes here	
Legal description from the Statutes of Alberta 2003, Electoral Divisions Act.
Starting at the right bank of the Oldman River and the north Lethbridge city boundary; then 1. east along the city boundary to 13 Street North; 2. south along 13 Street North and 13 Street South to 16 Avenue South; 3. west along 16 Avenue South to Scenic Drive South; 4. southeast along Scenic Drive South to the east boundary of Sec. 30 in Twp. 8, Rge. 21 W4; 5. south along Secs. 30, 19 and 18 in the Twp. to the right bank of the Oldman River; 6. upstream along the right bank to the north boundary of Sec. 16, Twp. 8, Rge. 22 W4; 7. east along the north boundary to the west Lethbridge city boundary; 8. north, east and northeast along the west city boundary to the starting point.
Note:

69 Lethbridge-West 2010 boundaries
Bordering districts
North	East	West	South
Little Bow	Lethbridge-East	Cardston-Taber-Warner	Little Bow
Legal description from the Statutes of Alberta 2010, Electoral Divisions Act.

=== Representation history ===
Lethbridge-West
Assembly	Years	Member	Party
Riding created from Lethbridge and Macleod
17th	1971–1975	Richard Gruenwald	Social Credit
18th	1975–1979	John Gogo	Progressive Conservative
19th	1979–1982	John Gogo	Progressive Conservative
20th	1982–1986	John Gogo	Progressive Conservative
21st	1986–1989	John Gogo	Progressive Conservative
22nd	1989–1993	John Gogo	Progressive Conservative
23rd	1993–1997	Clint Dunford	Progressive Conservative
24th	1997–2001	Clint Dunford	Progressive Conservative
25th	2001–2004	Clint Dunford	Progressive Conservative
26th	2004–2008	Clint Dunford	Progressive Conservative
27th	2008–2012	Greg Weadick	Progressive Conservative
28th	2012–2015	Greg Weadick	Progressive Conservative
29th	2015–2019	Shannon Phillips	New Democratic
30th	2019–2023	Shannon Phillips	New Democratic
31st	2023–2024	Shannon Phillips	New Democratic
31st	2024–present	Rob Miyashiro	New Democratic

The electoral district was created in 1971 from the old Lethbridge district when it was split in half. Prior to 1971 the city returned candidates from a number of different banners. The first representative returned in the election held that year was Social Credit candidate Richard Gruenwald who won the district with well over half of the popular vote.

Gruenwald would run for a second term in the 1975 election and would be defeated finishing a distant second place behind Progressive Conservative candidate John Gogo who took almost 60% of the popular vote. Gogo would win his next two terms in 1979 and 1982 with increasing majorities achieving almost 70% of the popular vote.

Gogo would lose significant popularity upon re-election to his fourth term in 1986. He would fall from 70% the previous election to under half. He would hold his seat for a final term in 1989 when he took just over 45% of the popular vote. In his last term in office Premier Don Getty appointed Gogo as Minister of Advanced education He held that until 1992. Gogo retired from dissolution of the Assembly in 1993.

The 1993 election saw a hotly contested race between Progressive Conservative candidate Clint Dunford and Liberal candidate Michael Dietrich. Dunford won by a razor thin margin of just over 100 votes to hold the seat for his party and taking just over 41% of the popular vote.

Dunford was re-elected in 1997 winning a slightly higher plurality. After the election he was appointed to the provincial cabinet by Premier Ralph Klein as Minister of Advanced Education and Career Development. In 1999 he was shuffled to the Minister of Human Resources and Employment portfolio.

Dunford ran for his third term in 2001 increasing his plurality slightly taking 48% of the popular vote and kept his cabinet post. He ran for his fourth term in office in 2004 and fell to an all-time low holding his seat with just 39% of the popular vote. After that election he was shuffled to the Minister of Economic Development until 2006. Dunford retired from the legislature in 2008.

The fourth representative returned from the riding was Progressive Conservative candidate Greg Weadick who won his first term as MLA in 2008, and was re-elected in 2012, but was defeated in the 2015 general election by Shannon Phillips of the NDP. In 2019, Phillips held onto the riding with a reduced margin of victory over the second-place finishing UCP candidate with just 45% of the popular vote.

== Legislative election results ==
=== Elections in the 2020s ===
Alberta provincial by-election, Lethbridge-West: December 18, 2024
Party	Candidate	Votes	%	±%
New Democratic	Rob Miyashiro	7,238	53.35	-0.57
United Conservative	John Middleton-Hope	6,093	44.91	+2.40
Alberta Party	Layton Veverka	237	1.75	-0.15
Total valid votes		13,568	99.46	
Rejected, spoiled, and declined		74	0.54	-0.47
Turnout		13,642	36.06	-25.71
Eligible voters		37,828		
New Democratic hold		Swing		-1.49
Source(s) Source: Elections Alberta

2023 Alberta general election
Party	Candidate	Votes	%	±%
New Democratic	Shannon Phillips	12,082	53.92	+8.70
United Conservative	Cheryl Seaborn	9,525	42.51	-1.78
Alberta Party	Braham Luddu	425	1.90	-5.34
Liberal	Pat Chizek	375	1.67	-0.21
Total		22,407	98.99	–
Rejected, spoiled and declined		228	1.01	+0.42
Turnout		22,635	61.77	-7.01
Eligible voters		36,642		
New Democratic hold		Swing		+5.24
Source(s) Source: Elections Alberta

=== Elections in the 2010s ===
2019 Alberta general election
Party	Candidate	Votes	%	±%
New Democratic	Shannon Phillips	11,016	45.22	-14.12
United Conservative	Karri Flatla	10,790	44.29	+7.01
Alberta Party	Zac Rhodenizer	1,763	7.24	--
Liberal	Patricia Chizek	460	1.89	-1.49
Independence	Ben Maddison	332	1.36	--
Total valid votes		24,361	99.42	
Rejected, spoiled, and declined		143	0.58	-0.37
Turnout		24,504	68.79	+13.26
Eligible voters		35,623		
New Democratic hold		Swing		-10.57
Source(s) Elections Alberta. "Electoral Division Results - Lethbridge-West".

2015 Alberta general election
Party	Candidate	Votes	%	±%
New Democratic	Shannon Phillips	11,114	59.34	+29.40
Progressive Conservative	Greg Weadick	3,938	20.97	-15.69
Wildrose	Ron Bain	3,063	16.31	-10.41
Liberal	Sheila Pyne	634	3.38	-2.18
Total valid votes		18,779	99.05	
Rejected, spoiled, and declined		181	0.95	-0.08
Registered electors / turnout		34,146	55.53	+0.81
New Democratic gain from Progressive Conservative		Swing		+22.54
Source(s) Elections Alberta. "Electoral Division Results - Lethbridge-West".

2012 Alberta general election
Party	Candidate	Votes	%	±%
Progressive Conservative	Greg Weadick	5,810	36.66	-7.03
New Democratic	Shannon Phillips	4,746	29.95	+19.65
Wildrose	Kevin Kinahan	4,235	26.72	+19.25
Liberal	Bal Boora	881	5.56	-29.57
Alberta Party	David Walters	177	1.12	–
Total valid votes		15,849	98.97	
Rejected, spoiled, and declined		165	1.03	+0.62
Turnout		16,014	54.72	+20.84
Eligible voters		29,267		
Progressive Conservative hold		Swing		-13.34
Source(s) Elections Alberta. "Electoral Division Results - Lethbridge-West".

=== Elections in the 2000s ===
2008 Alberta general election
Party	Candidate	Votes	%	±%
Progressive Conservative	Greg Weadick	5,002	43.69	+3.84
Liberal	Bal Boora	4,022	35.13	+2.34
New Democratic	James Moore	1,179	10.30	-1.96
Wildrose	Matt Fox	855	7.47	-0.78
Greens	Brennan Tilley	392	3.42	-0.05
Total votes		11,450	99.59	
Rejected, spoiled and declined		47	0.41	-0.17
Turnout		11,497	33.88	-11.62
Eligible voters		33,94		
Progressive Conservative hold		Swing		+0.75
Source(s) "65 - LETHBRIDGE-WEST". Elections Alberta.

2004 Alberta general election
Party	Candidate	Votes	%	±%
Progressive Conservative	Clint Dunford	4,411	39.85	-8.22
Liberal	Bal Boora	3,629	32.78	-6.74
New Democratic	Mark Sandlands	1,357	12.26	+4.62
Alberta Alliance	Merle Terlesky	913	8.25	
Greens	Andrew Sheridan	385	3.48	
Social Credit	Scott Sawatsky	375	3.39	
Total valid votes		11,070	99.43	
Rejected, spoiled and declined		64	0.57	+0.42
Turnout		11,134	45.50	-11.20
Eligible voters		24,471		
Progressive Conservative hold		Swing		-0.74
Source(s) "Lethbridge-West". Canadian Elections Database.

2001 Alberta general election
Party	Candidate	Votes	%	±%
Progressive Conservative	Clint Dunford	6,685	48.08	+2.76
Liberal	Leslie Vaala	5,496	39.53	+1.51
New Democratic	Mark Sandilands	1,062	7.64	+1.21
Alberta First	Brian Stewart	662	4.76	-3.56
Total valid votes		13,905	99.85	
Rejected, spoiled, and declined		21	0.15	
Turnout		13,926	56.70	+1.12
Eligible voters		24,561		
Progressive Conservative hold		Swing		+0.63
Source(s) "Lethbridge-West". Canadian Elections Database.

=== Elections in the 1990s ===
1997 Alberta general election
Party	Candidate	Votes	%	±%
Progressive Conservative	Clint Dunford	5,679	45.31	+3.39
Liberal	Leslie Vaala	4,765	38.02	-2.92
Social Credit	Brian Stewart	1,043	8.32	
New Democratic	Tom Hovan	806	6.43	-2.35
Greens	Don Ferguson	240	1.91	
Total valid votes		12,533		
Eligible electors / Turnout		22,549	55.58	+0.38
Progressive Conservative hold		Swing		+3.15
Source(s) "Lethbridge-West". Canadian Elections Database.

1993 Alberta general election
Party	Candidate	Votes	%	±%
Progressive Conservative	Clint Dunford	4,643	41.92	-3.52
Liberal	Michael Dietrich	4,534	40.94	+10.17
New Democratic	Jacqueline Preyde	973	8.78	-15.01
Independent	Jason Kempt	926	8.36	
Total		11,076	99.56	
Rejected, spoiled and declined		49	0.44	+0.25
Turnout		11,125	55.20	+7.23
Eligible voters		20,154		
Progressive Conservative hold		Swing		-6.84
Source(s) "Lethbridge-West". Canadian Elections Database.

=== Elections in the 1980s ===
1989 Alberta general election
Party	Candidate	Votes	%	±%
Progressive Conservative	John Gogo	4,741	45.44	-3.20
Liberal	Rhonda Ruston	3,210	30.76	+11.56
New Democratic	Joyce Green	2,483	23.80	-0.60
Total valid votes		10,434	99.75	
Rejected, spoiled and declined		26	0.25	-0.03
Turnout		10,460	47.97	+9.68
Eligible voters		21,805		
Progressive Conservative hold		Swing		-7.38
Source(s) "Lethbridge-West". Canadian Elections Database.

1986 Alberta general election
Party	Candidate	Votes	%	±%
Progressive Conservative	John Gogo	3,999	48.64	-20.89
New Democratic	Ed Webking	2,006	24.40	+8.96
Liberal	Nora Galenzoski	1,579	19.20	
Representative	Douglas Pitt	532	6.47	+2.45
Confederation of Regions	Nora Galenzoski	106	1.29	
Total valid votes		8,222	99.72	
Rejected, spoiled and declined		23	0.28	+0.06
Turnout		8,245	38.29	-23.39
Eligible voters		21,535		
Progressive Conservative hold		Swing		-14.92
Source(s) "Lethbridge-West". Canadian Elections Database.

1982 Alberta general election
Party	Candidate	Votes	%	±%
Progressive Conservative	John Gogo	8,302	69.53	+4.88
New Democratic	Ian Whishaw	1,844	15.44	+4.39
Western Canada Concept	G.M. Genstad	938	7.86	
Social Credit	Jerry Waldern	480	4.02	-14.47
Alberta Reform Movement	Brenda Perkins	377	3.16	
Total valid votes		11,941	99.78	
Rejected, spoiled and declined		26	0.22	+0.14
Turnout		11,967	61.68	+7.10
Eligible voters		19,403		
Progressive Conservative hold		Swing		+0.24
Source(s) "Lethbridge-West". Canadian Elections Database.

=== Elections in the 1970s ===
1979 Alberta general election
Party	Candidate	Votes	%	±%
Progressive Conservative	John Gogo	5,682	64.65	+5.23
Social Credit	Jerry Waldern	1,625	18.49	-10.01
New Democratic	Ron Clark	971	11.05	-1.04
Liberal	Bob Wilson	511	5.81	
Total valid votes		8,789	99.92	
Rejected, spoiled and declined		7	0.08	-1.86
Turnout		8,796	54.58	-9.92
Eligible voters		16,117		
Progressive Conservative hold		Swing		+7.62
Source(s) "Letbridge-West Official Results 1979 Alberta general election". Alberta Heritage Community Foundation. Archived from the original on December 8, 2010.

1975 Alberta general election
Party	Candidate	Votes	%	±%
Progressive Conservative	John Gogo	3,991	59.42	+23.17
Social Credit	Richard Gruenwald	1,914	28.49	-26.43
New Democratic	Ian Whishaw	812	12.09	+3.26
Total valid votes		6,717	98.06	
Rejected, spoiled and declined		133	1.94	+0.96
Turnout		6,850	64.49	-8.76
Eligible voters		10,621		
Progressive Conservative gain from Social Credit		Swing		+24.80
Source(s) "Lethbridge-West". Canadian Elections Database.

1971 Alberta general election
Party	Candidate	Votes	%
Social Credit	Richard Gruenwald	4,169	54.93
Progressive Conservative	R.J. Gray	2,751	36.25
New Democratic	Klaas Buijert	670	8.83
Total valid votes		7,590	99.02
Rejected, spoiled and declined		75	0.98
Turnout		7,665	73.25
Eligible voters		10,464	
Social Credit pickup new district.			
Source(s) "Lethbridge-West". Canadian Elections Database.

== Senate nominee election results ==
=== 2004 ===
2004 Senate nominee election results: Lethbridge-West				Turnout 45.59%	
Candidate	Votes	% votes	% ballots	Rank	
Progressive Conservative	Bert Brown	3,233	13.26%	38.29%	1
Independent	Link Byfield	2,946	12.08%	34.89%	4
Progressive Conservative	Betty Unger	2,906	11.92%	34.41%	2
Independent	Tom Sindlinger	2,741	11.24%	32.46%	9
Alberta Alliance	Vance Gough	2,263	9.28%	26.80%	8
Alberta Alliance	Michael Roth	2,205	9.04%	26.11%	7
Progressive Conservative	Cliff Breitkreuz	2,169	8.90%	25.69%	3
Progressive Conservative	David Usherwood	2,043	8.38%	24.20%	6
Progressive Conservative	Jim Silye	1,970	8.08%	23.33%	5
Alberta Alliance	Gary Horan	1,905	7.82%	22.56%	10
Total votes		24,381	100%		
Total ballots		8,444	2.89 votes per ballot		
Rejected, spoiled and declined		2,712			

Voters had the option of selecting four candidates on the ballot

== Student vote results ==
=== 2004 ===
Participating schools
GS Lakie Middle School

On November 19, 2004, a student vote was conducted at participating Alberta schools to parallel the 2004 Alberta general election results. The vote was designed to educate students and simulate the electoral process for persons who have not yet reached the legal majority. The vote was conducted in 80 of the 83 provincial electoral districts with students voting for actual election candidates. Schools with a large student body that reside in another electoral district had the option to vote for candidates outside of the electoral district then where they were physically located.

2004 Alberta student vote results
Affiliation	Candidate	Votes	%
Progressive Conservative	Clint Dunford	184	34.26%
Liberal	Bal Boora	133	24.77%
NDP	Mark Sandilands	75	13.97%
Green	Andrew Sheridan	61	11.36%
Social Credit	Scott Sawatsky	44	8.19%
Alberta Alliance	Merle Terlesky	40	7.45%
Total		537	100%
Rejected, spoiled and declined		19	

== See also ==
- List of Alberta provincial electoral districts
- Canadian provincial electoral districts
