= Archibald D. Johnston =

Canadian politician

Member of the Legislative Assembly of Alberta
- In office 1975–1993
- Preceded by: John Victor Anderson
- Succeeded by: Ken Nicol
- Constituency: Lethbridge-East

Personal details
- Born: March 5, 1940 Lethbridge, Alberta, Canada
- Died: June 25, 2003 (aged 63) Paris, France
- Party: Progressive Conservative Association of Alberta
- Education: University of Alberta
- Occupation: accountant

Archibald (Dick) Johnston (March 5, 1940 – June 25, 2003) was a provincial politician from Alberta, Canada. He served as a member of the Legislative Assembly of Alberta from 1975 to 1993.

== Political career ==
Johnston ran for a seat in the Alberta Legislature in the 1975 Alberta general election as a candidate for the Progressive Conservative Party in the Lethbridge East electoral district. He won the race with a landslide majority, defeating incumbent Social Credit MLA John Anderson and two other candidates to win his first term in office. After the election, Premier Peter Lougheed appointed Johnston to the cabinet as Minister of Municipal Affairs.

Johnston stood for a second term and won the 1979 Alberta general election; his plurality dropped but he still easily defeated four other candidates. After winning his second term Lougheed moved him to be the new Minister of Intergovernmental Relations. He stood for a third term in office in the 1982 Alberta general election. He won the largest popular vote of his career, taking the district in a landslide and defeating four other candidates. He was then moved to his third portfolio as the Minister of Advanced Education and Technology.

Johnston ran for his fourth term in the 1986 Alberta general election, losing almost half of his popular vote from the previous general election but still taking the district comfortably. After the election, Johnston was appointed to his most valuable portfolio yet as the Minister of Finance, holding that post until Ralph Klein became Premier in 1992. He stood for office for one more term, in the 1989 Alberta general election. He was returned to office, his popular vote rebounding slightly from 1986. The two opposition candidates saw marginal increased support. He retired at dissolution of the Assembly in 1993.

Johnston died on June 25, 2003, in Paris, France.

Legislative Assembly of Alberta
Preceded by John Victor Anderson	MLA Lethbridge East; 1975-1993	Succeeded by Ken Nicol
