= Raj Sherman =

Canadian politician (born 1965)

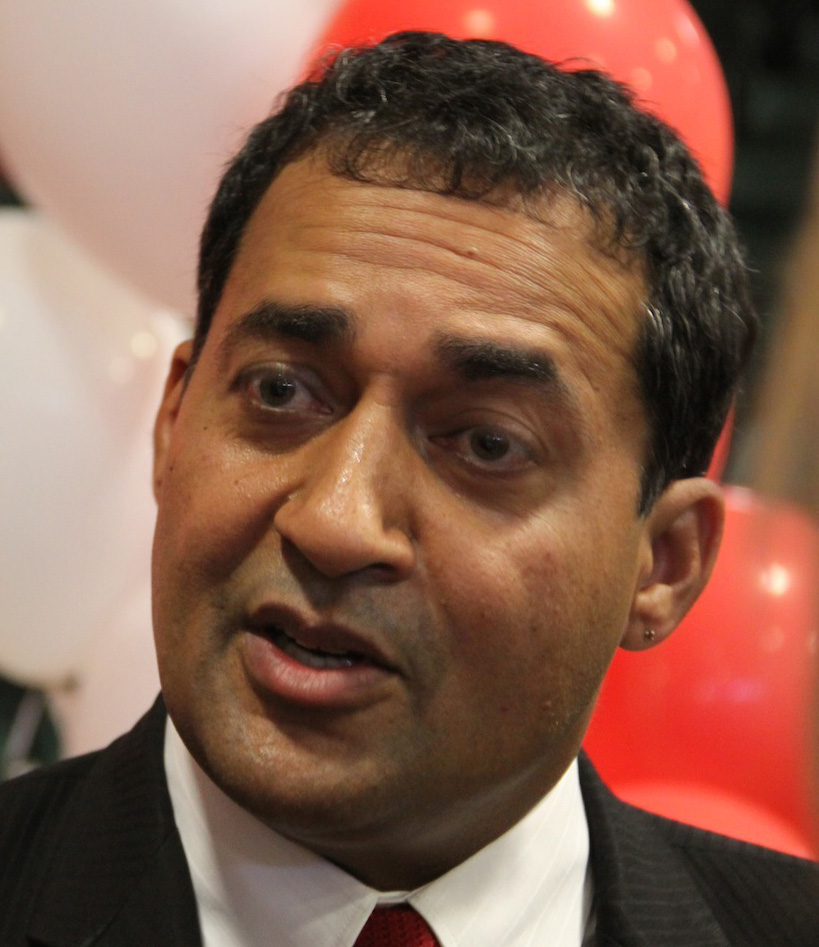
- Sherman in 2011

Leader of the Opposition in Alberta
- In office September 12, 2011 – April 23, 2012
- Preceded by: David Swann
- Succeeded by: Danielle Smith

Leader of the Alberta Liberal Party
- In office September 10, 2011 – January 26, 2015
- Preceded by: David Swann
- Succeeded by: David Swann (interim)

Member of the Legislative Assembly of Alberta for Edmonton-Meadowlark
- In office March 3, 2008 – May 5, 2015
- Preceded by: Maurice Tougas
- Succeeded by: Jon Carson

Personal details
- Born: 1965 (age 60–61) Rajasthan, India
- Party: United Conservative (since 2022)
- Other political affiliations: Liberal (2011–2022); Independent (2010–2011); Progressive Conservative Association (2008–2010)
- Education: University of Alberta
- Occupation: Emergency physician

Rajnish K. "Raj" Sherman (born 1965) is a Canadian politician from Alberta and former Liberal Member of the Legislative Assembly of Alberta for Edmonton-Meadowlark; which he formerly represented as a Progressive Conservative. Sherman was elected leader of the Liberal Party on September 10, 2011, and led the party through the 2012 provincial election. He announced his immediate resignation on January 26, 2015, and that he would not be running for a third term as MLA in the next provincial election.

== Early life ==
Sherman was born in 1965 in India but grew up in Squamish, British Columbia after moving there in 1975. As a youngster, he delivered newspapers for The Vancouver Sun and The Province. The third of four sons, Sherman moved to Canada from India at a young age. He moved to Edmonton in the early 1980s to attend the University of Alberta. He graduated from faculty of medicine in 1990, specializing in family and emergency medicine. In addition to being a doctor, Sherman was also a clinical lecturer at the University of Alberta and president of the Emergency Physicians of Alberta within the Alberta Medical Association.

== Political career ==
Sherman first sought public office in the March 2008 provincial election in the constituency of Edmonton-Meadowlark. The seat was left vacant after incumbent Liberal MLA Maurice Tougas retired. Sherman, running as a Progressive Conservative candidate, won the riding comfortably, receiving 2,752 votes over his closest rival, Liberal Debbie Cavaliere. After his election, he was named parliamentary assistant to the Minister of Health and Wellness, Ron Liepert. He also served as a member of the Standing Committee on Health and the Standing Committee on Privileges and Elections, Standing Orders and Printing. He works as an emergency department doctor on Sundays.

In November 2010, Sherman criticized the government for emergency department wait times in Alberta. He was suspended from the Progressive Conservative caucus and sat as an independent MLA. The following spring, he announced his intention to seek the Alberta Liberal Party leadership. At the 2011 leadership convention, he was elected on the first ballot. He became the first Visible Minority to lead the Alberta Liberal Party and the first Hindu to lead a Canadian political party.

In the 2012 Alberta election, Sherman was successful in retaining his seat of Edmonton-Meadowlark with 35.5% of the vote, this time as a member of the Liberal Party. He defeated PC candidate Bob Maskell by 118 votes (0.8%). In the election, the Liberals fell from Official Opposition to third party status behind the PCs and Wildrose. Despite losing almost 17% of the popular vote in a very hotly contested election, the vote was concentrated in enough ridings to retain 5 of their previous MLA's and keep ahead of the NDP. The Liberals lost Edmonton-Riverview, Edmonton-Gold Bar and Calgary-Varsity to the Progressive Conservatives due to tactical voting and the retirement of the incumbent MLAs.

Sherman announced his immediate resignation as Liberal leader on January 26, 2015, citing personal reasons and also announced that he would not run for re-election as an MLA but would remain in the legislature until the next election. Sherman was under investigation by Elections Alberta after allegations he breached political contribution limits by donating more than $15,000 to the party and resigned prior to the results of the investigation being released.

In 2022, he attempted to enter the United Conservative Party leadership election. He requested an exemption to run in the race for not being a party member for 6 months, but it was rejected by the UCP Leadership Election Committee.

In February 2023, he won the UCP nomination in Edmonton-Whitemud against Varun Chandrasekar and David Masieyi. He would be defeated by NDP incumbent Rakhi Pancholi.

== Personal life ==
Sherman has coached soccer and basketball, served as the director for the Society of Helping Lives in Poverty, and is a past member of the McKernan housing community. He received a gold pin for his service with STARS and a bronze medal from the Alberta Northwest Lifesaving Society. In his spare time, Sherman enjoys sports, travel and the arts.

While in medical school, Sherman married at the age 21 and had two children. The marriage ended several years later in part, Sherman says, because as a young doctor he "was never home."

== Election results ==
=== 2023 general election ===
2023 Alberta general election: Edmonton-Whitemud
Party	Candidate	Votes	%	±%
New Democratic	Rakhi Pancholi	12,797	60.40	+11.22
United Conservative	Raj Sherman	7,799	36.81	-2.63
Liberal	Donna Wilson	370	1.75	–
Green	Cheri Hawley	221	1.04	–
Total		21,187	99.29	–
Rejected and declined		152	0.71	
Turnout		21,339	64.65	
Eligible voters		33,005		
New Democratic hold		Swing		+6.92
Source(s) Source: Elections Alberta

UCP Edmonton-Whitemud nomination contest: February 23, 2023

Candidate	Votes	%
Raj Sherman	322	78.0
Varun Chandrasekar	84	20.3
David Masieyi	7	1.7
Total	413	100.0

=== 2012 general election ===
2012 Alberta general election: Edmonton-Meadowlark
Party	Candidate	Votes	%	±%
Liberal	Raj Sherman	5,149	35.48	+5.08
Progressive Conservative	Bob Maskell	5,031	34.67	-20.16
Wildrose	Rick Newcombe	2,977	20.52	+17.80
New Democratic	Bridget Stirling	1,092	7.53	-1.44
Alberta Party	Neil Mather	262	1.81	–
Total		14,511	–	–
Rejected, spoiled and declined		82	–	–
Eligible electors / turnout		27,506	53.05%	13.55%
Liberal gain from Progressive Conservative		Swing		-11.81%
Source(s) Source: "Elections Alberta 2012 General Election". Elections Alberta.

=== 2008 general election ===
2008 Alberta general election: Edmonton-Meadowlark
Party	Candidate	Votes	%	±%
Progressive Conservative	Raj Sherman	6,174	54.83%	15.36%
Liberal	Debbie Cavaliere	3,423	30.40%	-10.86%
New Democratic	Pascal Ryffel	1,010	8.97%	-3.18%
Green	Amanda Doyle	347	3.08%	0.82%
Wildrose	Richard Guyon	306	2.72%	–
Total		11,260	–	–
Rejected, spoiled and declined		38	–	–
Eligible electors / turnout		28,602	39.50%	-5.79%
Progressive Conservative gain from Liberal		Swing		11.32%
Source(s) Source: "Elections Alberta 2008 General Election". Elections Alberta.
