= Edmonton-Meadowlark =

Defunct provincial electoral district in Alberta, Canada

Coordinates: 53.54°N 113.65°W

Alberta electoral district
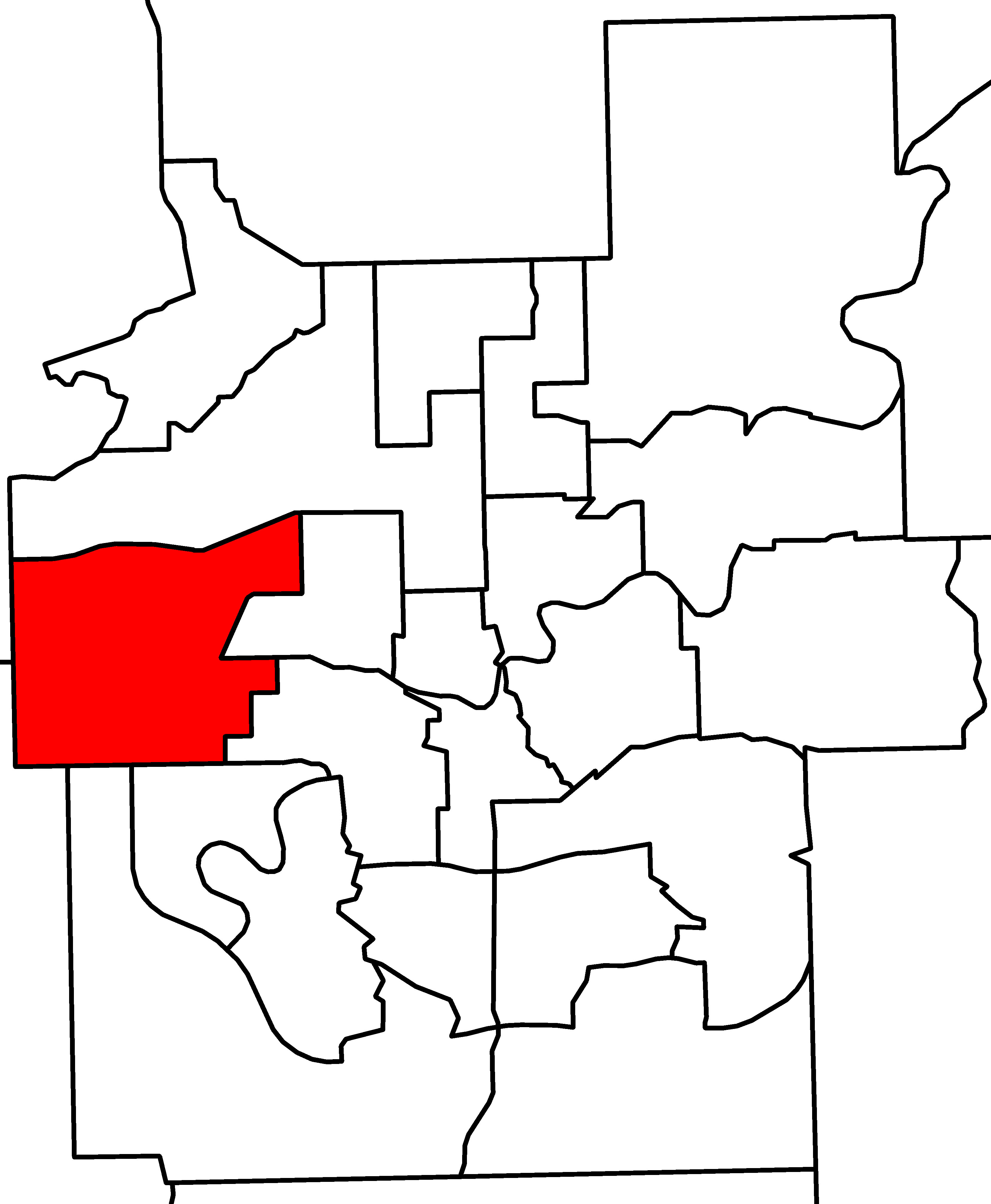
- 2010 boundaries

Defunct provincial electoral district
- Legislature: Legislative Assembly of Alberta
- District created: 1971
- District abolished: 2019
- First contested: 1971
- Last contested: 2015

Edmonton Meadowlark was a provincial electoral district in Alberta, Canada, mandated to return a single member to the Legislative Assembly of Alberta using the first past the post method of voting from 1971 to 2019.

The electoral district located on the western edge of Edmonton was created in the 1971 boundary redistribution from the old electoral districts of Edmonton Jasper Place and Edmonton West.

The district has switched support between Progressive Conservative and Liberal candidates with regular frequency since it was created, a trend broken by the election of the New Democrat MLA Jon Carson in the 2015 general election.

== History ==
The electoral district was created in the 1971 boundary redistribution from the old electoral districts of Edmonton Jasper Place and Edmonton West. The 1993 redistribution would see the district go through a significant redrawing as most of the riding which was south of Whitemud Drive would be moved into the new district of Edmonton-McClung. The riding remained a rectangle shape between Whitemud and Stony Plain road with little changes made in 1996 and 2003.

The 2010 electoral boundary re-distribution would see a significant change as the riding was extended well beyond Stony Plain road up to Yellowhead Trail into land that was once in Edmonton-Calder and Edmonton-Glenora.

=== Boundary history ===
36 Edmonton-Meadowlark 2003 boundaries
Bordering districts
North	East	West	South
Edmonton-Calder and Edmonton-Glenora	Edmonton-Riverview	Stony Plain and Spruce Grove-Sturgeon-St. Albert	Edmonton-McClung
riding map goes here			
Legal description from the Electoral Divisions Act, S.A. 2003, c. E-4.1
Starting at the intersection of the west Edmonton city boundary with Stony Plain Road; then 1. east along Stony Plain Road to 156 Street; 2. south along 156 Street to 95 Avenue; 3. west along 95 Avenue to 163 Street; 4. south along 163 Street to 87 Avenue; 5. east along 87 Avenue to 159 Street; 6. south along 159 Street to Whitemud Drive; 7. west along Whitemud Drive to the west Edmonton city boundary; 8. west and north along the west city boundary to the starting point.
Note:

39 Edmonton-Meadowlark 2010 boundaries
Bordering districts
North	East	West	South
Edmonton-Calder	Edmonton-Glenora and Edmonton-Riverview	Spruce Grove-St. Albert and Stony Plain	Edmonton-McClung and Edmonton-South West
Legal description from the Statutes of Alberta 2010, Electoral Divisions Act.

=== Electoral history ===
Members of the Legislative Assembly for Edmonton-Meadowlark
Assembly	Years	Member	Party
See: Edmonton Jasper Place and Edmonton West 1963–1971
17th	1971–1975	Gerard Amerongen	Progressive Conservative
18th	1975–1979	Gerard Amerongen	Progressive Conservative
19th	1979–1982	Gerard Amerongen	Progressive Conservative
20th	1982–1986	Gerard Amerongen	Progressive Conservative
21st	1986–1989	Grant Mitchell	Liberal
22nd	1989–1993	Grant Mitchell	Liberal
23rd	1993–1997	Karen Leibovici	Liberal
24th	1997–2001	Karen Leibovici	Liberal
25th	2001–2004	Bob Maskell	Progressive Conservative
26th	2004–2008	Maurice Tougas	Liberal
27th	2008–2010	Raj Sherman	Progressive Conservative
27th	2010–2011	Raj Sherman	Independent
27th	2011	Raj Sherman	Independent Liberal
27th	2011–2012	Raj Sherman	Liberal
28th	2012–2015	Raj Sherman	Liberal
29th	2015–2019	Jon Carson	New Democratic
See: Edmonton-West Henday and Edmonton-McClung 2019–

The electoral district was created in the 1971 boundary redistribution. The election held that year saw Progressive Conservative candidate Gerard Amerongen pickup the new district for his party. He was successful after running as a candidate in various districts since the 1950s. Amerongen was elected as Speaker of the Assembly when it met for its first session after the election in 1972.

Amerongen won re-election with increasing majorities three more times in the 1975, 1979 and 1982 general elections. He ran for a fifth term in the 1986 general election but was defeated in a shocking upset by Liberal candidate Grant Mitchell. This was only the second time in Alberta history that the Speaker of the legislature had been defeated.

Mitchell was re-elected to his second term with a large majority in the 1989 general election. He ran for re-election in the Edmonton-McClung after redistricting created the new district out of most of the old land that covered Meadowlark. The new boundaries of Meadowlark returned Liberal candidate Karen Leibovici who won her first term with a substantial majority to hold the seat for her party.

Leibovici won her second term (in a closely contested race in the 1997 general election) defeating Progressive Conservative candidate Laurie Pushor. In the 2001 general election she was defeated by Progressive Conservative candidate, Bob Maskell, who won by 600 votes to pick up the district.

Maskell would only stay for a single term in office as he was defeated by Maurice Tougas in the 2004 general election. Tougas did not stand for re-election in 2008 due to frustrations with being an opposition MLA, and Progressive Conservative candidate Raj Sherman picked up the open district.

Sherman was removed from the Progressive Conservative caucus after making unsubstantiated allegations against the Alberta Government regarding abuses against staff working under Alberta Health Services. He at first sat as an independent on November 22, 2010, than on March 15, 2011, he began caucusing with the Liberal caucus as an independent. He was elected as leader of the provincial Liberals on September 10, 2011, and became a full member of the Liberal caucus two days later. He was re-elected in the 2012 provincial election and decided to retire from politics in 2015.

Like the rest of the city, Edmonton-Meadowlark swung hard to the NDP in that election, with Jon Carson easily capturing the seat. The riding was abolished for the 2019 election, replaced by Edmonton-West Henday.

== Legislative election results ==
=== 1971 ===
1971 Alberta general election
Party	Candidate	Votes	%	±%
Progressive Conservative	Gerard Amerongen	6,371	56.66%	–
Social Credit	Alexander Romaniuk	3,839	34.14%	–
New Democratic	Alan J. Idiens	1,035	9.20%	–
Total		11,245	–	–
Rejected, spoiled and declined		28	–	–
Eligible electors / turnout		15,944	70.70%	–
Progressive Conservative pickup new district.				
Source(s) Source: "Edmonton-Meadowlark Official Results 1971 Alberta general election". Alberta Heritage Community Foundation.

=== 1975 ===
1975 Alberta general election
Party	Candidate	Votes	%	±%
Progressive Conservative	Gerard Amerongen	6,715	67.75%	11.09%
New Democratic	Harvey Tilden	1,406	14.18%	4.98%
Social Credit	Russ Forsythe	1,093	11.03%	-23.11%
Liberal	Vic Yanda	698	7.04%	–
Total		9,912	–	–
Rejected, spoiled and declined		13	–	–
Eligible electors / turnout		19,714	50.34%	-20.36%
Progressive Conservative hold		Swing		15.52%
Source(s) Source: "Edmonton-Meadowlark Official Results 1975 Alberta general election". Alberta Heritage Community Foundation.

=== 1979 ===
1979 Alberta general election
Party	Candidate	Votes	%	±%
Progressive Conservative	Gerard Amerongen	7,075	60.15%	-7.59%
New Democratic	Jim Bell	2,098	17.84%	3.65%
Social Credit	Russ Forsythe	1,237	10.52%	-0.51%
Liberal	Ron Charko	904	7.69%	0.64%
Independent	C.A. Doug Ringrose	448	3.81%	–
Total		11,762	–	–
Rejected, spoiled and declined		36	–	–
Eligible electors / turnout		23,118	51.03%	0.69%
Progressive Conservative hold		Swing		-5.62%
Source(s) Source: "Edmonton-Meadowlark Official Results 1979 Alberta general election". Alberta Heritage Community Foundation.

=== 1982 ===
1982 Alberta general election
Party	Candidate	Votes	%	±%
Progressive Conservative	Gerard Amerongen	10,817	58.59%	-1.56%
New Democratic	Robert Henderson	4,590	24.86%	7.02%
Western Canada Concept	Ai (Bud) Wilson	1,511	8.18%	–
Liberal	N.A. Chaudhary	776	4.20%	-3.48%
Independent	Wm. (Bill) Dickson	423	2.29%	–
Social Credit	Andy H. Groenink	345	1.87%	-8.65%
Total		18,462	–	–
Rejected, spoiled and declined		46	–	–
Eligible electors / turnout		29,252	63.27%	12.24%
Progressive Conservative hold		Swing		-4.29%
Source(s) Source: "Edmonton-Meadowlark Official Results 1982 Alberta general election". Alberta Heritage Community Foundation.

=== 1986 ===
1986 Alberta general election
Party	Candidate	Votes	%	±%
Liberal	Grant Mitchell	4,913	42.59%	38.39%
Progressive Conservative	Gerard Amerongen	4,222	36.60%	-21.99%
New Democratic	Muriel Stanley Venne	2,135	18.51%	-6.35%
Representative	R. (Bob) Genis-Bell	176	1.53%	–
Western Canada Concept	Norm Kyle	90	0.78%	-7.40%
Total		11,536	–	–
Rejected, spoiled and declined		14	–	–
Eligible electors / turnout		23,485	49.18%	-14.09%
Liberal gain from Progressive Conservative		Swing		-13.87%
Source(s) Source: "Edmonton-Meadowlark Official Results 1986 Alberta general election". Alberta Heritage Community Foundation.

=== 1989 ===
1989 Alberta general election
Party	Candidate	Votes	%	±%
Liberal	Grant Mitchell	7,877	55.76%	13.17%
Progressive Conservative	Joan Majeski	4,421	31.29%	-5.30%
New Democratic	William A. (Bill) Mullen	1,829	12.95%	-5.56%
Total		14,127	–	–
Rejected, spoiled and declined		25	–	–
Eligible electors / turnout		25,251	56.05%	6.86%
Liberal hold		Swing		9.24%
Source(s) Source: "Edmonton-Meadowlark Official Results 1989 Alberta general election". Alberta Heritage Community Foundation.

=== 1993 ===
1993 Alberta general election
Party	Candidate	Votes	%	±%
Liberal	Karen Leibovici	7,215	56.51%	0.75%
Progressive Conservative	Laurie Pushor	3,978	31.16%	-0.14%
New Democratic	William (Bill) Mullen	1,111	8.70%	-4.25%
Social Credit	Norm Case	354	2.77%	–
Natural Law	Margo Cochlan	110	0.86%	–
Total		12,768	–	–
Rejected, spoiled, and declined		25	–	–
Eligible electors / turnout		22,094	57.90%	1.86%
Liberal hold		Swing		0.44%
Source(s) Source: "Edmonton-Meadowlark Official Results 1993 Alberta general election". Alberta Heritage Community Foundation.

=== 1997 ===
1997 Alberta general election
Party	Candidate	Votes	%	±%
Liberal	Karen Leibovici	6,047	50.22%	-6.28%
Progressive Conservative	Laurie Pushor	4,672	38.80%	7.65%
New Democratic	Terri McNally	831	6.90%	-1.80%
Social Credit	Aaron Hinman	435	3.61%	0.84%
Natural Law	Geoff Toane	55	0.46%	-0.40%
Total		12,040	–	–
Rejected, spoiled and declined		27	–	–
Eligible electors / turnout		21,488	56.16%	-1.75%
Liberal hold		Swing		-6.97%
Source(s) Source: "Edmonton-Meadowlark Official Results 1997 Alberta general election". Alberta Heritage Community Foundation.

=== 2001 ===
2001 Alberta general election
Party	Candidate	Votes	%	±%
Progressive Conservative	Bob Maskell	6,108	48.62%	9.82%
Liberal	Karen Leibovici	5,674	45.17%	-5.06%
New Democratic	Mike Hudema	636	5.06%	-1.84%
Independent	Peggy Morton	144	1.15%	–
Total		12,562	–	–
Rejected, spoiled and declined		31	–	–
Eligible electors / turnout		22,491	55.99%	-0.17%
Progressive Conservative gain from Liberal		Swing		-3.98%
Source(s) Source: "Edmonton-Meadowlark Official Results 2001 Alberta general election". Alberta Heritage Community Foundation.

=== 2004 ===
2004 Alberta general election
Party	Candidate	Votes	%	±%
Liberal	Maurice Tougas	4,435	41.26%	-3.90%
Progressive Conservative	Bob Maskell	4,242	39.47%	-9.16%
New Democratic	Lance Burns	1,306	12.15%	7.09%
Alberta Alliance	Aaron Campbell	446	4.15%	–
Greens	Amanda Doyle	243	2.26%	–
Independent	Peggy Morton	76	0.71%	-0.44%
Total		10,748	–	–
Rejected, spoiled and declined		51	–	–
Eligible electors / turnout		23,845	45.29%	-10.70%
Liberal gain from Progressive Conservative		Swing		-0.83%
Source(s) Source: "Edmonton-Meadowlark Official Results 2004 Alberta general election". Alberta Heritage Community Foundation.

=== 2008 ===
2008 Alberta general election
Party	Candidate	Votes	%	±%
Progressive Conservative	Raj Sherman	6,174	54.83%	15.36%
Liberal	Debbie Cavaliere	3,423	30.40%	-10.86%
New Democratic	Pascal Ryffel	1,010	8.97%	-3.18%
Green	Amanda Doyle	347	3.08%	0.82%
Wildrose	Richard Guyon	306	2.72%	–
Total		11,260	–	–
Rejected, spoiled and declined		38	–	–
Eligible electors / turnout		28,602	39.50%	-5.79%
Progressive Conservative gain from Liberal		Swing		11.32%
Source(s) Source: "Elections Alberta 2008 General Election". Elections Alberta.

=== 2012 ===
2012 Alberta general election
Party	Candidate	Votes	%	±%
Liberal	Raj Sherman	5,149	35.48	+5.08
Progressive Conservative	Bob Maskell	5,031	34.67	-20.16
Wildrose	Rick Newcombe	2,977	20.52	+17.80
New Democratic	Bridget Stirling	1,092	7.53	-1.44
Alberta Party	Neil Mather	262	1.81	–
Total		14,511	–	–
Rejected, spoiled and declined		82	–	–
Eligible electors / turnout		27,506	53.05%	13.55%
Liberal gain from Progressive Conservative		Swing		-11.81%
Source(s) Source: "Elections Alberta 2012 General Election". Elections Alberta.

=== 2015 ===
2015 Alberta general election
Party	Candidate	Votes	%	±%
New Democratic	Jon Carson	9,796	56.96%	49.43%
Progressive Conservative	Katherine O'Neill	3,924	22.82%	-11.85%
Wildrose	Amber Maze	1,972	11.47%	-9.05%
Liberal	Dan Bildhauer	1,507	8.76%	-26.72%
Total		17,199	–	–
Rejected, spoiled and declined		57	–	–
Eligible electors / turnout		31,865	54.15%	1.10%
New Democratic gain from Liberal		Swing		16.66%
Source(s) Source: "Elections Alberta 2015 General Election". Elections Alberta.

== Senate nominee election results ==
=== 2004 ===
2004 Senate nominee election results: Edmonton-Meadowlark				Turnout 45.36%	
Affiliation	Candidate	Votes	% votes	% ballots	Rank
Progressive Conservative	Betty Unger	4,528	17.12%	51.41%	2
Independent	Link Byfield	3,161	11.95%	35.89%	4
Progressive Conservative	Bert Brown	3,100	11.72%	35.20%	1
Progressive Conservative	Cliff Breitkreuz	2,929	11.07%	33.25%	3
Alberta Alliance	Michael Roth	2,285	8.64%	25.94%	7
Independent	Tom Sindlinger	2,173	8.21%	24.67%	9
Alberta Alliance	Gary Horan	2,114	7.99%	24.00%	10
Alberta Alliance	Vance Gough	2,107	7.96%	23.92%	8
Progressive Conservative	David Usherwood	2,104	7.95%	23.89%	6
Progressive Conservative	Jim Silye	1,955	7.39%	22.20%	5
Total votes		26,456	100%		
Total ballots		8,808	3.00 votes per ballot		
Rejected, spoiled and declined		2,008			

Voters had the option of selecting four candidates on the ballot

== Student vote results ==
=== 2004 ===
Participating schools
Aldergrove Elementary
Aurora Charter School
Centennial Elementary
St Thomas More School
H.E. Beriault School
St. Francis Xavier School

On November 19, 2004, a student vote was conducted at participating Alberta schools to parallel the 2004 Alberta general election results. The vote was designed to educate students and simulate the electoral process for persons who have not yet reached the legal majority. The vote was conducted in 80 of the 83 provincial electoral districts with students voting for actual election candidates. Schools with a large student body that reside in another electoral district had the option to vote for candidates outside of the electoral district then where they were physically located.

2004 Alberta student vote results
Affiliation	Candidate	Votes	%
Liberal	Maurice Tougas	363	33.24%
Progressive Conservative	Bob Maskell	330	30.22%
NDP	Lance Burns	214	19.60%
Green	Amanda Doyle	131	12.00%
Alberta Alliance	Aaron Campbell	38	3.48%
Independent	Peggy Morton	16	1.46%
Total		1,092	100%
Rejected, spoiled and declined		31	

=== 2012 ===
2012 Alberta student vote results
Affiliation	Candidate	
Progressive Conservative	Bob Maskell	
Wildrose	Rick Newcombe	
Liberal	Raj Sherman	
NDP	Bridget Stirling	
Total		100%

== See also ==
- List of Alberta provincial electoral districts
- Canadian provincial electoral districts
