= Clint Dunford =

Canadian politician (1943–2021)

Member of the Legislative Assembly of Alberta
- In office June 15, 1993 – March 3, 2008
- Preceded by: John Gogo
- Succeeded by: Greg Weadick
- Constituency: Lethbridge West

Personal details
- Born: Clinton Earl Dunford; February 21, 1943 Dauphin, Manitoba, Canada
- Died: October 14, 2021 (aged 78) Lethbridge, Alberta, Canada
- Party: Progressive Conservative Association of Alberta

Clinton Earl Dunford (February 21, 1943 – October 14, 2021) was a Canadian politician in Lethbridge, Alberta. He was first elected in 1993 as the Member of the Legislative Assembly for Lethbridge West, and elected to his fourth term on November 22, 2004. He did not seek re-election in the 2008 election.

He served as Minister of Alberta Advanced Education and Career Development, Minister of Alberta Human Resources and Employment and Minister of Economic Development, and he was responsible for the Personnel Administration Office, the Alberta Labour Relations Board, Workers Compensation Board, and Appeals Commission for Alberta Workers Compensation.

Dunford was raised in Portreeve, Saskatchewan. He held a bachelor's degree, majoring in economics, from the University of Calgary. Before his MLA career, he was president and owner of CED Consulting Ltd. in Lethbridge.

Dunford was diagnosed with incurable cancer (Multiple Myeloma) in November 2005. He continued to work while undergoing cancer treatment in Edmonton, receiving a stem cell transplant in April 2006.

Dunford died on October 14, 2021, at the age of 78. He lived in Lethbridge with his wife Gwen. He had one son, three stepsons, and nine grandchildren.
