= Gerard Amerongen =

Canadian politician and lawyer

Speaker of the Legislative Assembly of Alberta
- In office 1971–1986
- Preceded by: Arthur J. Dixon
- Succeeded by: David J. Carter

Member of the Legislative Assembly of Alberta for Edmonton-Meadowlark
- In office 1971–1986
- Succeeded by: Grant Mitchell

Personal details
- Born: Gerard Joseph Taets van Amerongen; July 18, 1914 Winnipeg, Manitoba, Canada
- Died: April 21, 2013 (aged 98) Edmonton, Alberta, Canada
- Party: Progressive Conservative
- Education: University of Alberta
- Profession: lawyer

Gerard Joseph Taets van Amerongen (July 18, 1914 – April 21, 2013) was a politician and lawyer from Alberta, Canada.

He was born in 1914 in Winnipeg and grew up in Edmonton. He graduated in law from the University of Alberta. He first ran for the Legislative Assembly of Alberta in the 1955 provincial election, as the Progressive Conservative candidate in the Edmonton district. He finished 18th on the first ballot and was eliminated in transfers.

He ran in the next three provincial general elections in various districts and was defeated each time. He was first elected in the 1971 provincial election in the district of Edmonton-Meadowlark. He was appointed Speaker and held that position until 1986 when he was defeated in his riding by Grant Mitchell, who later became leader of the Alberta Liberal Party.

Amerongen was the second sitting speaker to be defeated in Alberta but the first sitting speaker to be defeated while his party retained a majority government.

He operated a law firm in Edmonton until 2007.

== Bibliography ==
- Perry, Sandra E.; Footz, Valerie L. (2006). A Higher Duty : Speakers of the Legislative Assemblies of the North-West Territories and Alberta, 1888-2005. Edmonton, Alberta: Legislative Assembly of Alberta. ISBN 0-9689217-3-6.

Legislative Assembly of Alberta
Preceded by New District	MLA Edmonton-Meadowlark; 1971-1986	Succeeded by Grant Mitchell
Preceded by Arthur J. Dixon	Speaker of the Alberta Legislative Assembly; 1972-1986	Succeeded by David J. Carter
