= Lethbridge-East =

Provincial electoral district in Alberta, Canada

Alberta electoral district
- Lethbridge-East within the City of Lethbridge, 2017 boundaries

Provincial electoral district
- Legislature: Legislative Assembly of Alberta
MLA
Nathan Neudorf
United Conservative
- District created: 1971
- First contested: 1971
- Last contested: 2023

Demographics
- Census subdivision(s): Lethbridge

Lethbridge-East is a provincial electoral district in Alberta, Canada, covering the eastern half of the city of Lethbridge. The district is one of 87 in the province mandated to return a single member to the Legislative Assembly of Alberta using the first past the post method of voting. The electoral district was created in the 1971 boundary redistribution when the old Lethbridge district was split into this district and Lethbridge-West.

The current representative for Lethbridge-East is United Conservative Nathan Neudorf, who won his first term on April 16, 2019. Prior to him it was held by New Democrat Maria Fitzpatrick, from 2015 to 2019, Liberal-turned-PC Bridget Pastoor from 2004 to 2015 and Liberal Ken Nicol from 1993 to 2004. Progressive Conservatives and Social Credit representatives have also held this district in the past.

== History ==
The electoral district was created in the 1971 boundary redistribution when the old electoral district of Lethbridge was split in half.

The 2010 boundary redistribution made some minor revisions to equalize the population between West and East. North of St. Edward Blvd the boundary was pushed west from 13 Street to Stafford Drive.

=== Boundary history ===
64 Lethbridge-East 2003 boundaries
Bordering districts
North	East	West	South
Little Bow	Little Bow	Lethbridge-West	Little Bow
riding map goes here		map in relation to other districts in Alberta goes here	
Legal description from the Statutes of Alberta 2003, Electoral Divisions Act.
Starting at the intersection of 13 Street North and the north Lethbridge city boundary; then 1. generally east, south and west along the city boundary to the right bank of the Oldman River; 2. north along the right bank to the east boundary of Sec. 18 in Twp. 8, Rge. 21 W4; 3. north along the east boundary of Secs. 18, 19 and 30 in the Twp. to Scenic Drive; 4. northwest along Scenic Drive to 16 Avenue South; 5. east along 16 Avenue South to 13 Street South; 6. north along 13 Street South and 13 Street North to the starting point.
Note:

68 Lethbridge-East 2010 boundaries
Bordering districts
North	East	West	South
Little Bow	Little Bow	Lethbridge-West	Little Bow
Legal description from the Statutes of Alberta 2010, Electoral Divisions Act.

=== Representation history ===
Lethbridge-East
Assembly	Years	Member	Party
Riding created from Lethbridge
17th	1971–1975	John Anderson	Social Credit
18th	1975–1979	Archibald Johnston	Progressive Conservative
19th	1979–1982	Archibald Johnston	Progressive Conservative
20th	1982–1986	Archibald Johnston	Progressive Conservative
21st	1986–1989	Archibald Johnston	Progressive Conservative
22nd	1989–1993	Archibald Johnston	Progressive Conservative
23rd	1993–1997	Ken Nicol	Liberal
24th	1997–2001	Ken Nicol	Liberal
25th	2001–2004	Ken Nicol	Liberal
25th	2004–2004	Vacant	Vacant
26th	2004–2008	Bridget Pastoor	Liberal
27th	2008–2011	Bridget Pastoor	Liberal
27th	2011–2012	Bridget Pastoor	Progressive Conservative
28th	2012–2015	Bridget Pastoor	Progressive Conservative
28th	2015–2019	Maria Fitzpatrick	New Democratic
30th	2019–2023	Nathan Neudorf	United Conservative
31st	2023–Present	Nathan Neudorf	United Conservative

The electoral district was created in the 1971 boundary redistribution. The first election that year saw a hotly contested race between Social Credit candidate John Anderson and Progressive Conservative candidate Richard Barton. Anderson won by just under a thousand votes to pick up the new seat for his party despite Social Credit losing government that year.

Anderson would be defeated in the 1975 general election by Archibald Johnston who won in a landslide. He would be appointed to the provincial cabinet by Premier Peter Lougheed after the election. He was re-elected to his second term in the 1979 election with a smaller majority.

The 1982 general election saw Johnston win the biggest majority of his career and the history of the district. He was re-elected to a fourth term in the 1986 general election and a fifth term in the 1989 general election. He held a cabinet post until 1992 when Ralph Klein became Premier. He retired at dissolution of the assembly in 1993.

The 1993 general election saw Liberal candidate Ken Nicol elected here in a closely contested race. Nicol won re-election in 1997 with a larger majority. He held his seat for a third term in the 2001 election and became Liberal leader later that year. Nicol resigned on May 25, 2004, to run for a seat to the House of Commons of Canada in the 2004 Canadian federal election.

The 2004 election saw Liberal candidate Bridget Pastoor win a closely contested race over Rod Fong to hold the district for her party. She was re-elected in 2008 as a Liberal, but crossed the floor to the Tories in 2011 and was reelected as a Tory in 2012. In 2015, Pastoor announced she would not seek re-election in the 2015 general election.

The 2015 election saw Maria Fitzpatrick of the NDP elected as MLA for Lethbridge-East. However, she was defeated after one term in office by Nathan Neudorf of the United Conservative Party on April 16, 2019.

== Legislative election results ==
=== 1971 ===
1971 Alberta general election results		Turnout 75.40%		Swing	
Affiliation	Candidate	Votes	%	Party	Personal
Social Credit	John Anderson	5,341	50.77%		
Progressive Conservative	Richard Barton	4,374	41.58%		
New Democratic	Douglas Poile	805	7.65%		
Total		10,520			
Rejected, spoiled and declined		105			
Eligible electors / Turnout		14,092	%		
Social Credit gain		Swing		N/A	

=== 1975 ===
1975 Alberta general election results		Turnout 64.09%		Swing	
Affiliation	Candidate	Votes	%	Party	Personal
Progressive Conservative	Archibald Johnston	7,233	66.98%	16.21%	
Social Credit	John Anderson	1,915	17.73%	-33.04%	
New Democratic	Bessie Annand	1,006	9.32%	1.67%	
Liberal	Shirley Wilson	645	5.97%	*	
Total		10,799			
Rejected, spoiled and declined		26			
Eligible electors / Turnout		16,891	%		
Progressive Conservative gain from Social Credit		Swing		24.63%	

=== 1979 ===
1979 Alberta general election results		Turnout 62.04%		Swing	
Affiliation	Candidate	Votes	%	Party	Personal
Progressive Conservative	Archibald Johnston	5,870	59.74%	-7.24%	
Independent Conservative	Ken Kotkas	1,375	13.99%	*	
Social Credit	Roxie McCallum	1,223	12.45%	-5.28%	
New Democratic	Roger Rickwood	692	7.04%	-2.28%	
Liberal	Frank Merkl	666	6.78%	0.81%	
Total		9,826			
Rejected, spoiled and declined		64			
Eligible electors / Turnout		15,941	%		
Progressive Conservative hold		Swing		-10.62%	

=== 1982 ===
1982 Alberta general election results		Turnout 69.52%		Swing	
Affiliation	Candidate	Votes	%	Party	Personal
Progressive Conservative	Archibald Johnston	8,716	69.72%	9.98%	
New Democratic	Ed McRae	1,369	10.95%	3.91%	
Western Canada Concept	Mike Bennison	1,054	8.43%	*	
Liberal	John Boras	962	7.70%	0.92%	
Alberta Reform Movement	Paul Belanger	400	3.20%	*	
Total		12,501			
Rejected, spoiled and declined		27			
Eligible electors / Turnout		18,020	%		
Progressive Conservative hold		Swing		6.95%	

=== 1986 ===
1986 Alberta general election results		Turnout 46.18%		Swing	
Affiliation	Candidate	Votes	%	Party	Personal
Progressive Conservative	Archibald Johnston	4,567	52.11%	-17.61%	
New Democratic	Sylvia Campbell	2,188	24.97%	14.02%	
Liberal	John Boras	2,009	22.92%	15.22%	
Total		8,764			
Rejected, spoiled and declined		22			
Eligible electors / Turnout		19,024	%		
Progressive Conservative hold		Swing		-15.82%	

=== 1989 ===
1989 Alberta general election results		Turnout 46.18%		Swing	
Affiliation	Candidate	Votes	%	Party	Personal
Progressive Conservative	Archibald Johnston	4,993	49.26%	-2.85%	
Liberal	John Boras	2,973	29.33%	6.41%	
New Democratic	Sylvia Campbell	2,170	21.41%	-3.56%	
Total		10,136			
Rejected, spoiled and declined		18			
Eligible electors / Turnout		18,970	%		
Progressive Conservative hold		Swing		-4.63%	

=== 1993 ===
1993 Alberta general election results		Turnout 50.97%		Swing	
Affiliation	Candidate	Votes	%	Party	Personal
Liberal	Ken Nicol	6,114	48.14%	18.81%	
Progressive Conservative	Patricia Bunn	5,092	40.09%	-9.17%	
New Democratic	Larry Conley	1,495	11.77%	-9.64%	
Total		12,701			
Rejected, spoiled and declined		75			
Eligible electors / Turnout		22,124	%		
Liberal pickup from Progressive Conservative				Swing 13.99%	

=== 1997 ===
1997 Alberta general election results		Turnout 55.29%		Swing	
Affiliation	Candidate	Votes	%	Party	Personal
Liberal	Ken Nicol	7,578	58.66%	10.52%	
Progressive Conservative	Leah Waters	3,813	29.52%	-10.57%	
Social Credit	Jonathan Williams	853	6.60%		
New Democratic	Inga Jesswein	674	5.22%	-6.55%	
Total		12,918			
Rejected, spoiled and declined		75			
Eligible electors / Turnout		23,413	%		
Liberal hold				Swing 10.55%	

=== 2001 ===
2001 Alberta general election results		Turnout 53.14%		Swing	
Affiliation	Candidate	Votes	%	Party	Personal
Liberal	Ken Nicol	6,939	54.47%	-4.19%	
Progressive Conservative	Ron Carroll	4,704	36.93%	7.41%	
Alberta First	Mark Ogden	554	4.35%		
New Democratic	Gaye Metz	542	4.25%	-0.97%	
Total		12,739			
Rejected, spoiled and declined		35			
Eligible electors / Turnout		24,040	%		
Liberal hold				Swing -5.80%	

=== 2004 ===
2004 Alberta general election
Party	Candidate	Votes	%	±%
Liberal	Bridget Pastoor	5,338	41.93%	−12.54%
Progressive Conservative	Rod Fong	4,703	36.94%	0.01%
Alberta Alliance	Brian Stewart	1,472	11.56%	*
New Democratic	Gaye Metz	606	4.76%	0.51%
Green	Erin Matthews	360	2.83%	*
Social Credit	Derin Popik	252	1.98%	*
Total		12,731	100%	
Rejected, spoiled and declined		84		
Eligible Electors / turnout		26,430	48.49%	
Liberal hold		Swing		−6.28%
Source: "Lethbridge-East Statement of Official Results 2004 Alberta general election" (PDF). Elections Alberta.

=== 2008 ===
2008 Alberta general election results		Turnout 35.37%		Swing	
Affiliation	Candidate	Votes	%	Party	Personal
Liberal	Bridget Pastoor	5,582	46.42%	4.49%	
Progressive Conservative	Jason Herasemluk	4,715	39.21%	2.27%	
Wildrose Alliance	Grant Shaw	748	6.22%	-5.34%	
New Democratic	Tom Moffat	687	5.71%	0.95%	
Green	Helen McMenamin	292	2.44%	-0.39%	*
Total		12,024			
Rejected, spoiled, and declined		70			
Eligible electors / Turnout		34,190	%		
Liberal hold				Swing 3.38%	

=== 2012 ===
2012 Alberta general election
Party	Candidate	Votes	%	±%
Progressive Conservative	Bridget Pastoor	6,599	40.95	+1.74
Wildrose	Kent Prestage	5,146	31.93	+25.71
Liberal	Rob Miyashiro	2,364	14.67	-31.75
New Democratic	Tom Moffatt	2,007	12.45	+6.74
Total valid votes		16,116	99.00	
Rejected, spoiled, and declined		163	1.00	
Registered electors / turnout		31,817	51.16	+15.79
Progressive Conservative gain from Liberal		Swing		-11.99
Source(s) Elections Alberta. "Electoral Division Results - Lethbridge-East".

=== 2015 ===
2015 Alberta general election
Party	Candidate	Votes	%	±%
New Democratic	Maria Fitzpatrick	8,918	47.49	+35.04
Progressive Conservative	Tammy Perlich	4,743	25.26	-15.69
Wildrose	Kent Prestage	3,918	20.86	-11.07
Liberal	Bill West	1,201	6.40	-8.27
Total valid votes		18,780	99.58	
Rejected, spoiled, and declined		80	0.42	-0.58
Registered electors / turnout		35,224	53.54	+2.38
New Democratic gain from Progressive Conservative		Swing		+25.37
Source(s) Elections Alberta. "Electoral Division Results - Lethbridge-East".

=== 2019 ===
2019 Alberta general election
Party	Candidate	Votes	%	±%
United Conservative	Nathan Neudorf	11,883	52.40	+6.28
New Democratic	Maria Fitzpatrick	8,775	38.70	-8.79
Alberta Party	Ally Taylor	1,054	4.65	--
Liberal	Devon Hargreaves	512	2.26	-4.14
Independence	John W. McCanna	453	2.00	--
Total valid votes		22,677	99.20	
Rejected, spoiled, and declined		183	0.80	+0.38
Turnout		22,860	66.91	+13.36
Eligible voters		34,167		
United Conservative gain from New Democratic		Swing		+7.54
Source(s) Elections Alberta. "Electoral Division Results - Lethbridge-East".

=== 2023 ===
2023 Alberta general election
Party	Candidate	Votes	%	±%
United Conservative	Nathan Neudorf	10,998	50.34	-2.06
New Democratic	Rob Miyashiro	10,362	47.43	+8.73
Liberal	Helen McMenamin	488	2.23	-0.02
Total		21,848	99.26	–
Rejected and declined		163	0.74	
Turnout		22,011	57.70	
Eligible voters		38,150		
United Conservative hold		Swing		-5.40
Source(s) Source: Elections Alberta

== Senate nominee election results ==
=== 2004 ===
2004 Senate nominee election results: Lethbridge-East				Turnout 48.48%	
Affiliation	Candidate	Votes	% votes	% ballots	Rank
Progressive Conservative	Bert Brown	3,586	13.65%	37.45%	1
Independent	Link Byfield	3,179	12.10%	33.20%	4
Progressive Conservative	Betty Unger	2,921	11.12%	30.50%	2
Independent	Tom Sindlinger	2,876	10.95%	30.03%	9
Alberta Alliance	Vance Gough	2,528	9.62%	26.40%	8
Alberta Alliance	Michael Roth	2,525	9.61%	26.37%	7
Progressive Conservative	Cliff Breitkreuz	2,323	8.84%	24.26%	3
Alberta Alliance	Gary Horan	2,212	8.42%	23.10%	10
Progressive Conservative	David Usherwood	2,094	7.97%	21.87%	6
Progressive Conservative	Jim Silye	2,027	7.72%	21.17%	5
Total votes		26,271	100%		
Total ballots		9,576	2.74 votes per ballot		
Rejected, spoiled and declined		3,236			

Voters had the option of selecting four candidates on the ballot

== Student vote results ==
=== 2004 ===
Participating schools
Catholic Central High School
Emmanuel Christian School
Lethbridge Christian School
Lethbridge Collegiate Institute
Our Lady of the Assumption School
Winston Churchill High School

On November 19, 2004, a student vote was conducted at participating Alberta schools to parallel the 2004 Alberta general election results. The vote was designed to educate students and simulate the electoral process for persons who have not yet reached the legal majority. The vote was conducted in 80 of the 83 provincial electoral districts with students voting for actual election candidates. Schools with a large student body that reside in another electoral district had the option to vote for candidates outside of the electoral district then where they were physically located.

2004 Alberta student vote results
Affiliation	Candidate	Votes	%
Progressive Conservative	Rod Fong	690	35.53%
Liberal	Bridget Pastoor	351	18.07%
NDP	Gaye Metz	275	14.16%
Alberta Alliance	Brian Stewart	269	13.85%
Green	Erin Matthews	249	12.82%
Social Credit	Derin Popik	108	5.57%
Total		1,942	100%
Rejected, spoiled and declined		72	

== See also ==
- List of Alberta provincial electoral districts
- Canadian provincial electoral districts
