= Ken Nicol (politician) =

Canadian politician and academic

Ken Nicol MLA

Leader of the Official Opposition in Alberta
- In office March 15, 2001 – March 26, 2004
- Preceded by: Nancy MacBeth
- Succeeded by: Kevin Taft

Leader of the Alberta Liberal Party
- In office 2001–2004
- Preceded by: Nancy MacBeth
- Succeeded by: Don Massey (interim)

MLA for Lethbridge East
- In office June 15, 1993 – 2004
- Preceded by: Archibald D. Johnston
- Succeeded by: Bridget Pastoor

Personal details
- Born: May 3, 1944 (age 81) Lethbridge, Alberta
- Party: Alberta Liberal Party
- Profession: Academic

Ken Nicol (born May 3, 1944) is a Canadian politician and academic.

He served as the MLA for Lethbridge-East from 1993 to 2004. During his final three years, he was the leader of the Alberta Liberal Party, and leader of the official opposition in the Legislative Assembly of Alberta. He was credited with bringing a more conciliatory approach in the legislature, different from his predecessor Nancy MacBeth, however his soft-spoken nature did not help the party rise in polls.

He left provincial politics to run for the federal Liberals in the riding of Lethbridge in 2004, but lost in a landslide to incumbent Rick Casson.

Nicol is currently an associate professor at the University of Lethbridge.
