= Bob Maskell =

Canadian politician (1940–2021)

MLA for Edmonton-Meadowlark
- In office 2001–2004
- Preceded by: Karen Leibovici
- Succeeded by: Maurice Tougas

Personal details
- Born: May 27, 1940
- Died: April 14, 2021 (aged 80) Edmonton, Alberta, Canada
- Party: Progressive Conservative Association of Alberta
- Education: University of Alberta
- Occupation: educator

Robert Maskell (May 27, 1940 – April 14, 2021) was a teacher and provincial level politician from Alberta, Canada. He served as a member of the Legislative Assembly of Alberta from 2001 until 2004.

== Early life ==
Maskell earned a Bachelor of Education degree at the University of Alberta. He became a teacher and then a principal at Jasper Place Composite High School and moved on to become the principal at the prestigious Victoria School of Performing and Visual Arts.

== Political career ==
Maskell was elected to the Alberta Legislature in the 2001 Alberta general election. He defeated incumbent Liberal MLA Karen Leibovici to pick up Edmonton-Meadowlark for the Progressive Conservatives. He ran for a second term in office in the 2004 Alberta general election but was defeated by less than a couple hundred votes by Maurice Tougas a candidate for the Liberals.

Maskell tried to regain his seat in the 2012 Alberta general election, losing out to Liberal Leader Raj Sherman by 118 votes. He died in 2021.
