= Greg Weadick =

Canadian politician

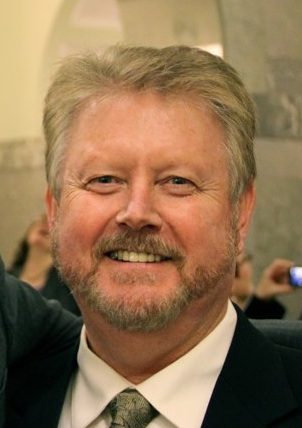
- Greg Weadick in 2011

Member of the Legislative Assembly of Alberta for Lethbridge-West
- In office March 3, 2008 – May 5, 2015
- Preceded by: Clint Dunford
- Succeeded by: Shannon Phillips

Personal details
- Born: February 7, 1954 (age 72) Fergus, Ontario
- Party: Progressive Conservative
- Spouse: Joanne
- Children: Josh and Lauren
- Education: University of Lethbridge

Gregory William Weadick (born February 7, 1954) is a Canadian politician and former Member of the Legislative Assembly of Alberta representing the constituency of Lethbridge-West as a Progressive Conservative.

== Early life ==
Weadick has deep roots in his community as a fourth-generation Lethbridgian. He earned a Bachelor of Science from the University of Lethbridge in 1976, before beginning his career as a certified irrigation design consultant. Weadick has been successful in small business, and is co-owner of Yardworks & Tileworks and president of Frontier Irrigation Inc. He was the founding president of Lethbridge Youth Services and 5th-on-5th Youth Services.

== Political career ==
Weadick was elected to three 3-Year Terms as Alderman for the City of Lethbridge Serving on Lethbridge City Council from October 1992 to October 2001. During this time He Chaired and Served on Numerous Provincial and Municipal boards and commissions, including Lethbridge Police Commission, Lethbridge and District Exhibition Board. Weadick won his provincial seat in Lethbridge-West in 2008, where he received 44 percent of the vote. He chairs the Cabinet Policy Committee on the Economy and is a member of the Special Standing Committee on Members Services and the Standing Committee on the Economy.

Weadick was called by Ed Stelmach to serve in the Cabinet as Minister of Advanced Education and Technology. As a Cabinet member, he played a leading role in implementing the Stelmach agenda.

Before entering provincial politics, Weadick was active in municipal government. He served as a city councillor in Lethbridge for nine years, starting in 1991. He was instrumental behind the "pay as you go" budget-balancing strategy. During this time, Weadick participated in Provincial Task Forces on police funding and air transportation.

In 1997, Weadick ran unsuccessfully for the former federal Progressive Conservative Party of Canada in the Lethbridge electoral district.

== Personal life ==
Weadick lives in Lethbridge with his wife, Joanne. Their two children, Josh and Lauren, attend the University of Lethbridge.

Weadick is one of the founders of the Lethbridge Rotary Dragon Boat Festival, founding president of the Lethbridge Youth Foundation and 5th on 5th Youth Services. He spent several years as director of the Lethbridge and District Chamber of Commerce and is a Rotarian.

== Election results ==
2008 Alberta general election: Lethbridge-West
Party	Candidate	Votes	%	±%
Progressive Conservative	Greg Weadick	5,002	43.69	+3.84
Liberal	Bal Boora	4,022	35.13	+2.34
New Democratic	James Moore	1,179	10.30	-1.96
Wildrose	Matt Fox	855	7.47	-0.78
Greens	Brennan Tilley	392	3.42	-0.05
Total votes		11,450	99.59	
Rejected, spoiled and declined		47	0.41	-0.17
Turnout		11,497	33.88	-11.62
Eligible voters		33,94		
Progressive Conservative hold		Swing		+0.75
Source(s) "65 - LETHBRIDGE-WEST". Elections Alberta.

2012 Alberta general election: Lethbridge-West
Party	Candidate	Votes	%	±%
Progressive Conservative	Greg Weadick	5,810	36.66	-7.03
New Democratic	Shannon Phillips	4,746	29.95	+19.65
Wildrose	Kevin Kinahan	4,235	26.72	+19.25
Liberal	Bal Boora	881	5.56	-29.57
Alberta Party	David Walters	177	1.12	–
Total valid votes		15,849	98.97	
Rejected, spoiled, and declined		165	1.03	+0.62
Turnout		16,014	54.72	+20.84
Eligible voters		29,267		
Progressive Conservative hold		Swing		-13.34
Source(s) Elections Alberta. "Electoral Division Results - Lethbridge-West".

2015 Alberta general election: Lethbridge-West
Party	Candidate	Votes	%	±%
New Democratic	Shannon Phillips	11,114	59.34	+29.40
Progressive Conservative	Greg Weadick	3,938	20.97	-15.69
Wildrose	Ron Bain	3,063	16.31	-10.41
Liberal	Sheila Pyne	634	3.38	-2.18
Total valid votes		18,779	99.05	
Rejected, spoiled, and declined		181	0.95	-0.08
Registered electors / turnout		34,146	55.53	+0.81
New Democratic gain from Progressive Conservative		Swing		+22.54
Source(s) Elections Alberta. "Electoral Division Results - Lethbridge-West".
