= Bridget Pastoor =

Canadian politician

Bridget A. Pastoor
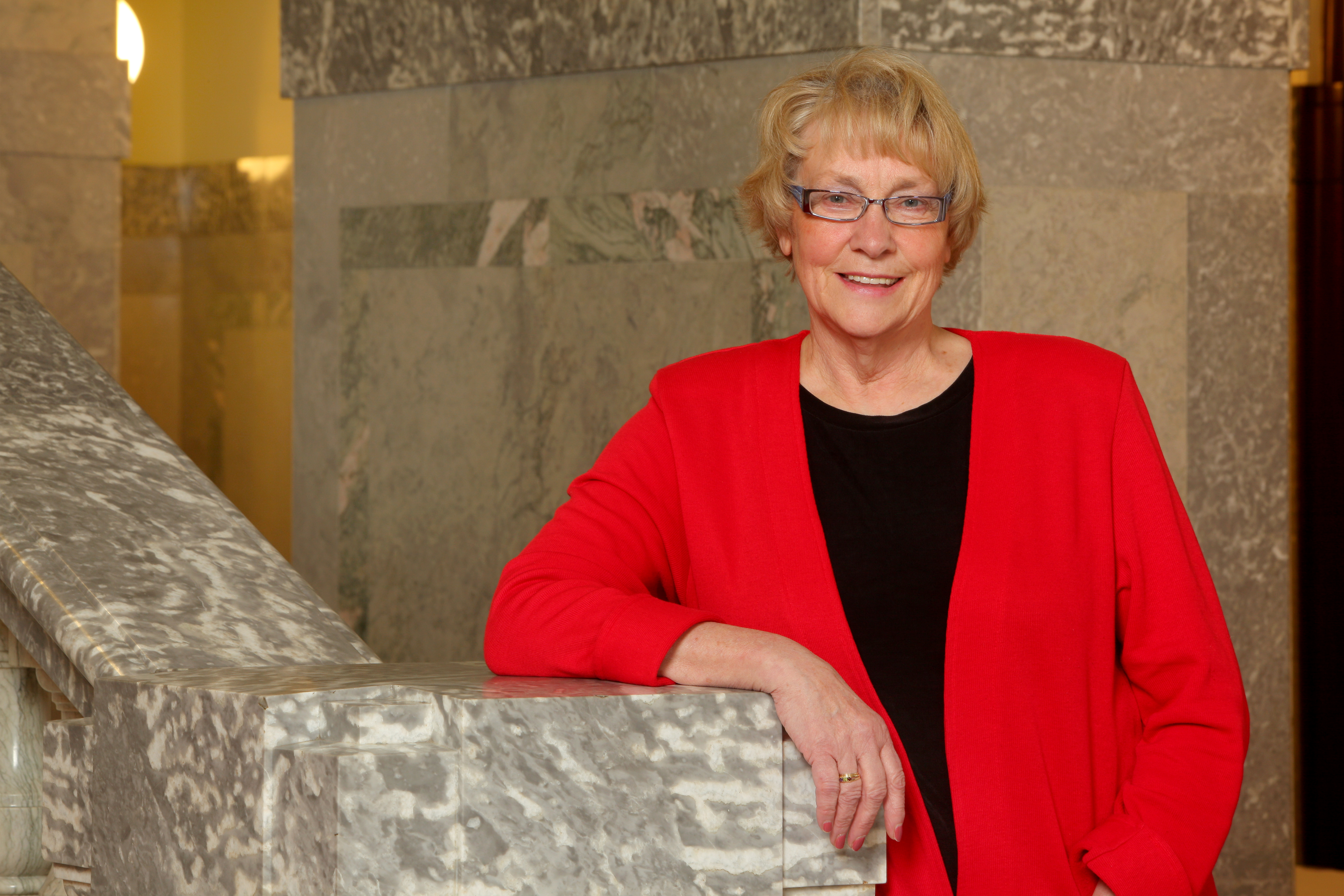

MLA for Lethbridge-East
- In office November 22, 2004 – May 5, 2015
- Preceded by: Ken Nicol
- Succeeded by: Maria Fitzpatrick

Personal details
- Born: Bridget Antoinette Brennan; April 13, 1940 (age 86) Saint Boniface, Manitoba
- Party: Progressive Conservative (before 2004, 2011-present); Liberal Party (2004-2011)

Bridget Antoinette Brennan Pastoor (born April 13, 1940) is a Canadian politician who served as a member of the Alberta legislative assembly from 22 November 2004 to May 5, 2015.

Pastoor began her political life when she ran in the 1998 election for a seat on the Lethbridge City Council in Lethbridge, Alberta. After serving two terms on city council and with the resignation of Alberta Liberal Party leader Ken Nicol, she decided to run in the 2004 provincial election to take his place in the Lethbridge-East riding. She won the riding with 5,340 votes, beating her nearest competitor Rod Fong by 637 votes.

== Political career ==
Pastoor was elected to her first term as a Member of the Legislative Assembly of Alberta for the constituency of Lethbridge-East on November 22, 2004. She was re-elected on March 3, 2008.

On November 21, 2011, Pastoor crossed the floor to join the Progressive Conservative government of Premier Alison Redford. She had actually been active in the PCs for most of the 1970s and 1980s, and had been a close friend of Redford for many years. Rumours that she was considering crossing the floor had begun in 2009 and in 2010 she admitted to considering switching parties.

Pastoor was re-elected in the 2012 provincial election under the Progressive Conservative banner.

In January 2015 she announced she would not seek another term.

== Personal life ==
In her farewell speech to the Alberta Legislature on March 26, 2015, Pastoor noted she had three daughters, two of whom were elected members of city councils in Alberta: Bridget Mearns, Lethbridge City Council and Florence Christophers, Okotoks Town Council. She also mentioned she was a grandmother and great-grandmother.
