= Rocky Mountain House (electoral district) =

Defunct provincial electoral district in Alberta, Canada

Coordinates: 52.1°N 116.5°W

Alberta electoral district
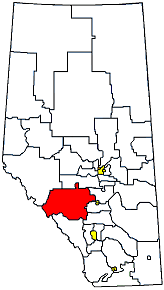
- 2004 boundaries

Defunct provincial electoral district
- Legislature: Legislative Assembly of Alberta
- District created: 1940
- District abolished: 2012
- First contested: 1940
- Last contested: 2008

Rocky Mountain House was a provincial electoral district in Alberta, Canada, mandated to return a single member to the Legislative Assembly of Alberta from 1940 to 2012.

== History ==
The district was one of 83 current districts mandated to return a single member to the Legislative Assembly of Alberta using the first past the post method of voting since 1959. Prior to that Single Transferable Vote was in use but no contest in this district went to a second round of counting.

The district, which was located in central western rural Alberta, was created from parts of four electoral districts in the 1940 boundary redistribution. It is named after the town of Rocky Mountain House.

The district elected Progressive Conservative MLAs since 1971. Prior to that it was represented by Alf Hooke. It was only held by four representatives.

The district was replaced in the 2010 Alberta electoral boundary re-distribution with Rimbey-Rocky Mountain House-Sundre.

=== Boundary history ===
73 Rocky Mountain House 2003 boundaries
Bordering districts
North	East	West	South
Drayton Valley-Calmar, West Yellowhead	Innisfail-Sylvan Lake, Lacombe-Ponoka, Olds-Didsbury-Three Hills	West Yellowhead	Banff-Cochrane
riding map goes here		map in relation to other districts in Alberta goes here	
Legal description from the Statutes of Alberta 2003, Electoral Divisions Act.
Starting at the intersection of the east boundary of Rge. 19 W5 and the north boundary of Twp. 44; then 1. east along the north boundary to the west boundary of O’Chiese Indian Reserve No. 203; 2. north, east and south along the boundary to the north boundary of Twp. 44; 3. east along the north boundary to the right bank of the North Saskatchewan River; 4. downstream along the right bank to the east boundary of Rge. 8 W5; 5. south along the east boundary to the north boundary of Twp. 44; 6. east along the north boundary to the east boundary of Sec. 5, Twp. 45, Rge. 4 W5; 7. north along the east boundary of Secs. 5, 8 and 17 to the north boundary of Sec. 16 in the Twp.; 8. east along the north boundary of Secs. 16, 15, 14 and 13 in the Twp. and east along the north boundary of Secs. 18, 17 and 16 in Twp. 45, Rge. 3 W5 to the intersection with Highway 20; 9. southeast along Highway 20 to the north boundary of Twp. 42; 10. west along the north boundary of Twp. 42 to the east boundary of Rge. 3 W5; 11. south along the east boundary of Rge. 3 W5 to the north boundary of Twp. 41; 12. east along the north boundary of Twp. 41 to the east shore of Gull Lake; 13. south along the east shore of Gull Lake to the north boundary of Twp. 40; 14. east along the north boundary of Twp. 40 to the east boundary of Rge. 28 W4; 15. south along the east boundary of Rge. 28 W4 to the right bank of the Blind Man River (at Sec. 12, Twp. 39, Rge. 28 W4); 16. upstream along the right bank of the Blind Man River to the east boundary of Sec. 15 in Twp. 39, Rge. 28 W4; 17. south along the east boundary of Sec. 15 to the north boundary of Sec. 10; 18. west along the north boundary of Secs. 10, 9 and 8 in the Twp. and the north boundary of Secs. 12, 11, 10, 9, 8 and 7 in Twp. 39, Rge. 1 to the east boundary of Rge. 2 W5; 19. north along the east boundary of Rge. 2 W5 to the north boundary of the south half of Sec. 13 in Twp. 39, Rge. 2 W5; 20. west along the north boundary of the south half of Sec. 13 to the east boundary of Sec. 14 in the Twp.; 21. south along the east boundary of Secs. 14, 11 and 2 to the north boundary of the south half of Sec. 2 in the Twp.; 22. west along the north boundary of the south half of Secs. 2, 3, 4, 5 and 6 to the east boundary of the west half of Sec. 6 in the Twp.; 23. south along the east boundary to the north boundary of Twp. 38 (Highway 11); 24. west along the north boundary of Twp. 38 (Highway 11) to the right bank of the Medicine River; 25. downstream along the right bank to the east boundary of Sec. 26 in Twp. 38, Rge. 3 W5; 26. south along the east boundary of Sec. 26 to the north boundary of Sec. 23; 27. west along the north boundary of Sec. 23 to the east boundary of the west half of Sec. 23 in the Twp.; 28. south along the east boundary to the north boundary of the south half of Sec. 23 in the Twp.; 29. west along the north boundary of the south half to the east boundary of Sec. 22 in the Twp.; 30. south along the east boundary to the north boundary of Sec. 15 in the Twp.; 31. west along the north boundary of Secs. 15, 16, 17 and 18 in the Twp. to the east boundary of Rge. 4 W5; 32. south along the east boundary to the north boundary of Sec. 25 in Twp. 36, Rge. 4 W5; 33. west along the north boundary of Secs. 25, 26, 27, 28, 29 and 30 in the Twp. to the east boundary of Rge. 5 W5; 34. south along the east boundary to the north boundary of Sec. 6 in Twp. 36, Rge. 4 W5; 35. east along the north boundary of Secs. 6, 5 and 4 to the east boundary of Sec. 4 in the Twp.; 36. south along the east boundary of Sec. 4 in the Twp. and the east boundary of Secs. 33, 28, 21, 16, 9 and 4 in Twp. 35 and the east boundary of Secs. 33 and 28 in Twp. 34, Rge. 4 W5 to the north boundary of Sec. 22 in the Twp.; 37. east along the north boundary of Secs. 22 and 23 to the east boundary of Sec. 23 in the Twp.; 38. south along the east boundary of Secs. 23 and 14 to the north boundary of Sec. 12 in the Twp.; 39. east along the north boundary to the east boundary of Rge. 4 W5; 40. south along the east boundary to Highway 27; 41. westerly along Highway 27 to Highway 22; 42. south along Highway 22 to the north boundary of Twp. 30; 43. west along the north boundary to the east boundary of Rge. 6 W5; 44. north along the east boundary of Rge. 6 to the north boundary of Sec. 12 in Twp. 31; 45. west along the north boundary of Secs. 12, 11 and 10 to the east boundary of Sec. 16; 46. north along the east boundary of Secs. 16, 21, 28 and 33 to the north boundary of Twp. 31; 47. west along the north boundary of Twp. 31 to the intersection with the right bank of the Red Deer River; 48. upstream along the right bank to the intersection with the east boundary of Rge. 8 W5; 49. south along the east boundary of Rge. 8 to the north boundary of Twp. 30; 50. west along the north boundary of Twp. 30 to the east boundary of Banff National Park; 51. in a generally northwesterly direction along the park boundary to the intersection with Rge. 19 W5; 52. project a line southwest from the east boundary of Rge. 19 to the Alberta-British Columbia boundary at its intersection with the north boundary of Twp. 32; 53. in a generally westerly and northerly direction along the Alberta-British Columbia boundary to the intersection with the south Jasper National Park boundary; 54. in a northeasterly direction along the park boundary to the right bank of the Brazeau River; 55. downstream along the right bank to the north boundary of Twp. 43; 56. east along the north boundary to the east boundary of Rge. 19 W5; 57. north along the east boundary to the starting point.
Note:

Members of the Legislative Assembly for Rocky Mountain House
See Edson 1913-1940, Innisfail 1905-1940, Red Deer 1905-1940 and Lacombe 1905-1940
Assembly	Years	Member	Party
9th	1940–1944	Alfred Hooke	Social Credit
10th	1944–1948	Alfred Hooke	Social Credit
11th	1948–1952	Alfred Hooke	Social Credit
12th	1952–1955	Alfred Hooke	Social Credit
13th	1955–1959	Alfred Hooke	Social Credit
14th	1959–1963	Alfred Hooke	Social Credit
15th	1963–1967	Alfred Hooke	Social Credit
16th	1967–1971	Alfred Hooke	Social Credit
17th	1971–1975	Helen Hunley	Progressive; Conservative
18th	1975–1979	Helen Hunley	Progressive; Conservative
19th	1979–1982	John Campbell	Progressive; Conservative
20th	1982–1986	John Campbell	Progressive; Conservative
21st	1986–1989	John Campbell	Progressive; Conservative
22nd	1989–1993	Ty Lund	Progressive; Conservative
23rd	1993–1997	Ty Lund	Progressive; Conservative
24th	1997–2001	Ty Lund	Progressive; Conservative
25th	2001–2004	Ty Lund	Progressive; Conservative
26th	2004–2008	Ty Lund	Progressive; Conservative
27th	2008–2012	Ty Lund	Progressive; Conservative
See Rimbey-Rocky Mountain House-Sundre 2012-present

=== Electoral history ===
The electoral district of Rocky Mountain House was created from parts of four different districts in the 1940 boundary re-distribution. The first election held that year saw Social Credit incumbent Alfred Hooke switch from the Red Deer provincial electoral district. He won his second term in office easily defeating two other candidates on the first ballot.

Hooke would be appointed to the first of his many cabinet portfolios as Provincial Secretary by Premier Ernest Manning in 1943. He would run for a third term and his first with ministerial advantage in the 1944 general election winning a larger majority. In 1945 Hooke also became the Minister of Economic Affairs.

The 1948 general election saw Hooke win his fourth straight term in office and third in the district, with a landslide over Co-operative Commonwealth candidate Ray Schmidt. Hooke won re-election five more times in 1952, 1955, 1959, 1963, and 1967.

Pundits had been predicting that Hooke would be defeated in the 1967 general election after a rift grew in the Social Credit party when national Social Credit leader Robert Thompson nominated an independent candidate to run against Hooke. He won the election easily. Hooke served in cabinet until 1968 when Harry Strom became Premier. He was not invited back to cabinet and retired at dissolution of the assembly in 1971.

The second representative in the district was elected in the 1971 general election. Progressive Conservative candidate Helen Hunley defeated Social Credit Harvey Staudinger to pick up the seat for her party. She was appointed to the first cabinet of Premier Peter Lougheed after the election. Hunley was re-elected in the 1975 defeating Staudinger for the second time with a larger victory. She remained in cabinet and retired from the legislature at dissolution in 1979. Hunley would be appointed remained in politics as she was appointed Lieutenant Governor in 1985.

Hunley was replaced in the legislature by Progressive Conservative candidate John Campbell in the 1979 general election. He won election twice more in 1982 and 1986 with large majorities.

The last representative in the district is Progressive Conservative MLA Ty Lund. Lund won the seat in the 1989 election for the first time with a landslide margin to hold the seat for his party. He was re-elected with a bigger majority in the 1993 election. Premier Ralph Klein appointed Lund to cabinet for the first time on September 15, 1994, as Minister of Environment.

He was re-elected four more times in 1997, 2001, 2004, and 2008. He kept serving various cabinet portfolio's until Premier Ed Stelmach took office in 2006.

The riding is notable for the electoral performances of Social Credit candidate Lavern Ahlstrom, who would later lead the party. Despite the party's minor status in recent times, Ahlstrom consistently polled well above his party's average in the elections he contested.

== Legislative election results ==
=== 1940 ===
1940 Alberta general election
Party	Candidate	Votes	%	±%
Social Credit	Alfred J. Hooke	2,477	52.26%	–
Independent	Tom Sigurdson	1,496	31.56%	–
Co-operative Commonwealth	Gus Maki	767	16.18%	–
Total		4,740	–	–
Rejected, spoiled and declined		224	–	–
Eligible electors / turnout		7,156	69.37%	–
Social Credit pickup new district.				
Source(s) Source: "Rocky Mountain House Official Results 1940 Alberta general election". Alberta Heritage Community Foundation.

=== 1944 ===
1944 Alberta general election
Party	Candidate	Votes	%	±%
Social Credit	Alfred J. Hooke	2,936	63.44%	11.18%
Co-operative Commonwealth	George Morrison	1,302	28.13%	11.95%
Farmer–Labour	J. Victor Johanson	390	8.43%	–
Total		4,628	–	–
Rejected, spoiled and declined		71	–	–
Eligible electors / turnout		6,984	67.28%	-2.09%
Social Credit hold		Swing		7.31%
Source(s) Source: "Rocky Mountain House Official Results 1944 Alberta general election". Alberta Heritage Community Foundation.

=== 1948 ===
1948 Alberta general election
Party	Candidate	Votes	%	±%
Social Credit	Alfred J. Hooke	3,582	72.41%	8.97%
Co-operative Commonwealth	Ray E. Schmidt	1,365	27.59%	-0.54%
Total		4,947	–	–
Rejected, spoiled and declined		255	–	–
Eligible electors / turnout		8,207	63.38%	-3.90%
Social Credit hold		Swing		4.75%
Source(s) Source: "Rocky Mountain House Official Results 1948 Alberta general election". Alberta Heritage Community Foundation.

=== 1952 ===
1952 Alberta general election
Party	Candidate	Votes	%	±%
Social Credit	Alfred J. Hooke	2,886	71.24%	-1.17%
Co-operative Commonwealth	Hubert M. Smith	1,165	28.76%	1.17%
Total		4,051	–	–
Rejected, spoiled and declined		211	–	–
Eligible electors / turnout		7,577	56.25%	-7.14%
Social Credit hold		Swing		-1.17%
Source(s) Source: "Rocky Mountain House Official Results 1952 Alberta general election". Alberta Heritage Community Foundation.

=== 1955 ===
1955 Alberta general election
Party	Candidate	Votes	%	±%
Social Credit	Alfred J. Hooke	2,829	63.63%	-7.61%
Liberal	C. Stauffer	1,200	26.99%	–
Co-operative Commonwealth	Bert Rear	417	9.38%	-19.38%
Total		4,446	–	–
Rejected, spoiled and declined		207	–	–
Eligible electors / turnout		6,779	68.64%	12.39%
Social Credit hold		Swing		-2.92%
Source(s) Source: "Rocky Mountain House Official Results 1955 Alberta general election". Alberta Heritage Community Foundation.

=== 1959 ===
1959 Alberta general election
Party	Candidate	Votes	%	±%
Social Credit	Alfred J. Hooke	3,235	74.68%	11.05%
Liberal	Tom Bert	660	15.24%	-11.76%
Co-operative Commonwealth	Ray E. Schmidt	437	10.09%	0.71%
Total		4,332	–	–
Rejected, spoiled and declined		13	–	–
Eligible electors / turnout		6,523	66.61%	-2.03%
Social Credit hold		Swing		11.40%
Source(s) Source: "Rocky Mountain House Official Results 1959 Alberta general election". Alberta Heritage Community Foundation.

=== 1963 ===
1963 Alberta general election
Party	Candidate	Votes	%	±%
Social Credit	Alfred J. Hooke	3,175	72.74%	-1.94%
New Democratic	Robert H. Carlyle	599	13.72%	3.63%
Liberal	Ellis M. Bowen	591	13.54%	-1.70%
Total		4,365	–	–
Rejected, spoiled and declined		25	–	–
Eligible electors / turnout		7,311	60.05%	-6.56%
Social Credit hold		Swing		-0.21%
Source(s) Source: "Rocky Mountain House Official Results 1963 Alberta general election". Alberta Heritage Community Foundation.

=== 1967 ===
1967 Alberta general election
Party	Candidate	Votes	%	±%
Social Credit	Alfred J. Hooke	2,538	53.59%	-19.15%
Independent	Will Sinclair	1,406	29.69%	–
New Democratic	Gilbert H. C. Farthing	792	16.72%	3.00%
Total		4,736	–	–
Rejected, spoiled and declined		34	–	–
Eligible electors / turnout		7,241	65.87%	5.83%
Social Credit hold		Swing		-17.56%
Source(s) Source: "Rocky Mountain House Official Results 1967 Alberta general election". Alberta Heritage Community Foundation.

=== 1971 ===
1971 Alberta general election
Party	Candidate	Votes	%	±%
Progressive Conservative	Helen Hunley	3,014	49.06%	–
Social Credit	Harvey Staudinger	2,472	40.24%	-13.35%
New Democratic	David Elliot	657	10.70%	-6.03%
Total		6,143	–	–
Rejected, spoiled and declined		36	–	–
Eligible electors / turnout		9,126	67.71%	1.83%
Progressive Conservative gain from Social Credit		Swing		-7.54%
Source(s) Source: "Rocky Mountain House Official Results 1971 Alberta general election". Alberta Heritage Community Foundation.

=== 1975 ===
1975 Alberta general election
Party	Candidate	Votes	%	±%
Progressive Conservative	Helen Hunley	4,119	66.09%	17.03%
Social Credit	Harvey Staudinger	1,537	24.66%	-15.58%
New Democratic	Morris Jenson	576	9.24%	-1.45%
Total		6,232	–	–
Rejected, spoiled and declined		14	–	–
Eligible electors / turnout		8,935	69.90%	2.20%
Progressive Conservative hold		Swing		16.30%
Source(s) Source: "Rocky Mountain House Official Results 1975 Alberta general election". Alberta Heritage Community Foundation.

=== 1979 ===
1979 Alberta general election
Party	Candidate	Votes	%	±%
Progressive Conservative	Jack Campbell	4,080	53.10%	-12.99%
Social Credit	Lavern J. Ahlstrom	2,628	34.21%	9.54%
New Democratic	John Younie	871	11.34%	2.09%
Liberal	Roger Hamilton	104	1.35%	–
Total		7,683	–	–
Rejected, spoiled and declined		N/A	–	–
Eligible electors / turnout		11,880	64.67%	-5.23%
Progressive Conservative hold		Swing		-11.27%
Source(s) Source: "Rocky Mountain House Official Results 1979 Alberta general election". Alberta Heritage Community Foundation.

=== 1982 ===
1982 Alberta general election
Party	Candidate	Votes	%	±%
Progressive Conservative	Jack Campbell	6,443	66.08%	12.98%
Western Canada Concept	Art Carritt	2,116	21.70%	–
New Democratic	Dolly (Martin) Brown	1,191	12.22%	0.88%
Total		9,750	–	–
Rejected, spoiled and declined		13	–	–
Eligible electors / turnout		13,303	73.39%	8.72%
Progressive Conservative hold		Swing		12.74%
Source(s) Source: "Rocky Mountain House Official Results 1982 Alberta general election". Alberta Heritage Community Foundation.

=== 1986 ===
1986 Alberta general election
Party	Candidate	Votes	%	±%
Progressive Conservative	Jack Campbell	3,844	53.31%	-12.77%
New Democratic	Dolly (Martin) Brown	1,266	17.56%	5.34%
Representative	Lavern J. Ahlstrom	1,042	14.45%	–
Liberal	Bob Paston	622	8.63%	–
Confederation of Regions	Art Carritt	436	6.05%	–
Total		7,210	–	–
Rejected, spoiled and declined		17	–	–
Eligible electors / turnout		13,662	52.90%	-20.49%
Progressive Conservative hold		Swing		-4.31%
Source(s) Source: "Rocky Mountain House Official Results 1986 Alberta general election". Alberta Heritage Community Foundation.

=== 1989 ===
1989 Alberta general election
Party	Candidate	Votes	%	±%
Progressive Conservative	Ty Lund	4,392	59.81%	6.50%
New Democratic	Dolly (Martin) Brown	1,727	23.52%	5.96%
Liberal	Bob Paston	1,224	16.67%	8.04%
Total		7,343	–	–
Rejected, spoiled and declined		27	–	–
Eligible electors / turnout		13,733	53.67%	0.77%
Progressive Conservative hold		Swing		0.27%
Source(s) Source: "Rocky Mountain House Official Results 1989 Alberta general election". Alberta Heritage Community Foundation.

=== 1993 ===
1993 Alberta general election
Party	Candidate	Votes	%	±%
Progressive Conservative	Ty Lund	5,192	55.79%	-4.03%
Social Credit	Lavern J. Ahlstrom	2,330	25.03%	–
Liberal	Roxanne V. Prior	1,181	12.69%	-3.98%
New Democratic	Drew Ludington	604	6.49%	-17.03%
Total		9,307	–	–
Rejected, spoiled and declined		16	–	–
Eligible electors / turnout		15,062	61.90%	8.23%
Progressive Conservative hold		Swing		-2.77%
Source(s) Source: "Rocky Mountain House Official Results 1993 Alberta general election". Alberta Heritage Community Foundation.

=== 1997 ===
1997 Alberta general election
Party	Candidate	Votes	%	±%
Progressive Conservative	Ty Lund	5,610	54.81%	-0.97%
Social Credit	Lavern J. Ahlstrom	3,264	31.89%	6.86%
Liberal	Roxanne Prior	880	8.60%	-4.09%
New Democratic	Christine McMeckan	481	4.70%	-1.79%
Total		10,235	–	–
Rejected, spoiled and declined		22	–	–
Eligible electors / turnout		18,464	55.55%	-6.35%
Progressive Conservative hold		Swing		-3.91%
Source(s) Source: "Rocky Mountain House Official Results 1997 Alberta general election". Alberta Heritage Community Foundation.

=== 2001 ===
2001 Alberta general election
Party	Candidate	Votes	%	±%
Progressive Conservative	Ty Lund	7,820	70.43%	15.61%
Social Credit	Lavern J. Ahlstrom	1,705	15.35%	-16.54%
Liberal	Wijnand Horemans	1,171	10.55%	1.95%
New Democratic	Doug Mac Angus	408	3.67%	-1.03%
Total		11,104	–	–
Rejected, spoiled and declined		25	–	–
Eligible electors / turnout		20,051	55.50%	-0.05%
Progressive Conservative hold		Swing		16.07%
Source(s) Source: "Rocky Mountain House Official Results 2001 Alberta general election". Alberta Heritage Community Foundation.

=== 2004 ===
2004 Alberta general election
Party	Candidate	Votes	%	±%
Progressive Conservative	Ty Lund	5,773	56.33%	-14.10%
Liberal	Susan M. Scott	1,266	12.35%	1.81%
Social Credit	Lavern J. Ahlstrom	1,265	12.34%	-3.01%
Alberta Alliance	Ed Wilhite	807	7.87%	–
Separation	Bruce Hutton	503	4.91%	–
Greens	Jennifer Isaac	335	3.27%	–
New Democratic	Anthony Jones	300	2.93%	-0.75%
Total		10,249	–	–
Rejected, spoiled and declined		40	–	–
Eligible electors / turnout		21,587	47.66%	-7.84%
Progressive Conservative hold		Swing		-5.55%
Source(s) Source: "Rocky Mountain House Statement of Official Results 2004 Alberta general election" (PDF). Elections Alberta.

=== 2008 ===
2008 Alberta general election
Party	Candidate	Votes	%	±%
Progressive Conservative	Ty Lund	6,188	62.30%	5.97%
Wildrose Alliance	Fanie Van Heerden	1,156	11.64%	3.77%
Liberal	Norm McDougall	849	8.55%	-3.81%
Green	Jennifer Ripley	699	7.04%	3.77%
Social Credit	Wilf Tricker	643	6.47%	-5.87%
New Democratic	Jorge Sousa	279	2.81%	-0.12%
Separation	Bruce Hutton	119	1.20%	-3.71%
Total		9,933	–	–
Rejected, spoiled and declined		40	–	–
Eligible electors / turnout		22,934	43.49%	-4.18%
Progressive Conservative hold		Swing		3.34%
Source(s) The Report on the March 3, 2008 Provincial General Election of the Twenty-seventh Legislative Assembly. Elections Alberta. July 28, 2008. pp. 518–523. "Elections Alberta 2008 General Election". Elections Alberta.

== Senate nominee election results ==
=== 2004 ===
2004 Senate nominee election results: Rocky Mountain House				Turnout 47.26%	
Affiliation	Candidate	Votes	% votes	% ballots	Rank
Progressive Conservative	Bert Brown	4,255	15.59%	48.00%	1
Progressive Conservative	Betty Unger	3,961	14.51%	44.69%	2
Independent	Link Byfield	2,996	10.97%	33.80%	4
Progressive Conservative	Cliff Breitkreuz	2,881	10.55%	32.50%	3
Progressive Conservative	Jim Silye	2,748	10.07%	31.00%	5
Progressive Conservative	David Usherwood	2,461	9.02%	27.76%	6
Alberta Alliance	Michael Roth	2,409	8.82%	27.18%	7
Alberta Alliance	Vance Gough	2,082	7.63%	23.49%	8
Alberta Alliance	Gary Horan	2,063	7.56%	23.27%	10
Independent	Tom Sindlinger	1,444	5.28%	16.29%	9
Total votes		27,300	100%		
Total ballots		8,864	3.08 votes per ballot		
Rejected, spoiled and declined		1,337			

Voters had the option of selecting four candidates on the ballot

== Plebiscite results ==
=== 1948 dlectrification plebiscite ===
District results from the first province-wide plebiscite on electricity regulation.

Option A	Option B
Are you in favour of the generation and distribution of electricity being continued by the Power Companies?	Are you in favour of the generation and distribution of electricity being made a publicly owned utility administered by the Alberta Government Power Commission?
2,210 45.63%	2,633 54.37%
Province wide result: Option A passed.

=== 1957 liquor plebiscite ===
1957 Alberta liquor plebiscite results: Rocky Mountain House
Question A: Do you approve additional types of outlets for the sale of beer, wine and spirituous liquor subject to a local vote?
Ballot choice	Votes	%
Yes	1,286	52.58%
No	1,160	47.42%
Total votes	2,446	100%
Rejected, spoiled and declined	7	
5,950 eligible electors, Turnout 41.23%

On October 30, 1957, a stand-alone plebiscite was held province wide in all 50 of the then current provincial electoral districts in Alberta. The government decided to consult Alberta voters to decide on liquor sales and mixed drinking after a divisive debate in the Legislature. The plebiscite was intended to deal with the growing demand for reforming antiquated liquor control laws.

The plebiscite was conducted in two parts. Question A asked in all districts, asked the voters if the sale of liquor should be expanded in Alberta, while Question B asked in a handful of districts within the corporate limits of Calgary and Edmonton asked if men and woman were allowed to drink together in establishments.

Province wide Question A of the plebiscite passed in 33 of the 50 districts while Question B passed in all five districts. Rocky Mountain House voted in favour of the proposal by a narrow majority. Voter turnout in the district was very low, falling well under the province wide average of 46%. This decline in turnout was attributed to heavy rains, high winds and flooding conditions in the district that kept people away from polling stations.

Official district returns were released to the public on December 31, 1957. The Social Credit government in power at the time did not considered the results binding. However the results of the vote led the government to repeal all existing liquor legislation and introduce an entirely new Liquor Act.

Municipal districts lying inside electoral districts that voted against the Plebiscite were designated Local Option Zones by the Alberta Liquor Control Board and considered effective dry zones, business owners that wanted a licence had to petition for a binding municipal plebiscite in order to be granted a licence.

== 2004 student vote results ==
Participating schools
Ecole Rocky Elementary
Sunchild First Nation School

On November 19, 2004, a student vote was conducted at participating Alberta schools to parallel the 2004 Alberta general election results. The vote was designed to educate students and simulate the electoral process for persons who have not yet reached the legal majority. The vote was conducted in 80 of the 83 provincial electoral districts with students voting for actual election candidates. Schools with a large student body that reside in another electoral district had the option to vote for candidates outside of the electoral district then where they were physically located.

2004 Alberta student vote results
Affiliation	Candidate	Votes	%
Progressive Conservative	Ty Lund	21	51.22%
Liberal	Susan Scott	9	21.95%
Green	Jennifer Isaac	4	9.75%
Social Credit	Lavern Ahlstrom	2	4.88%
NDP	Anthony Jones	2	4.88%
Alberta Alliance	Ed Wilhite	2	4.88%
Separation	Bruce Hutton	1	2.44%
Total		41	100%
Rejected, spoiled and declined		5	

== See also ==
- List of Alberta provincial electoral districts
- Canadian provincial electoral districts
