= Ty Lund =

Canadian politician (1938–2021)

Member of the Legislative Assembly of Alberta for Rocky Mountain House
- In office March 20, 1989 – April 23, 2012
- Preceded by: John Murray Campbell

Personal details
- Born: Tyrone Orville Lund; March 31, 1938 Rocky Mountain House, Alberta, Canada
- Died: February 28, 2021 (aged 82) Rimbey, Alberta, Canada
- Party: Progressive Conservative

Tyrone Orville Lund (March 31, 1938 – February 28, 2021) was a Canadian politician who served as Member of the Legislative Assembly of Alberta, representing the constituency of Rocky Mountain House (now Rimbey-Rocky Mountain House-Sundre) as a Progressive Conservative until his defeat in 2012.

== Early life ==
Lund was born on March 31, 1938, in Rocky Mountain House, Alberta. He was a third-generation farmer.

== Political career ==
Prior to entering provincial politics, Lund was involved in municipal government. He served as a municipal councillor of the Municipal District of Clearwater for nine years, beginning in 1980. For the last four of those years, Lund was reeve. He was also a member of the provincial executive of the Alberta Association of Municipal Districts and Counties from 1987 to 1989.

Lund was first elected as a Member of the Legislature in 1989, with 60 per cent of the vote in the constituency. During his past five terms, Lund has held many positions, including five ministerial portfolios. He was first appointed Minister of Environmental Protection in 1994, and re-appointed in 1997. In 1999, Lund became Minister of Alberta Agriculture, Food and Rural Development. He was then appointed Minister of Infrastructure in 2001. In 2004, he became Minister of Government Services. Lund held that position until April 2006, when he was appointed Minister of Infrastructure and Transportation, which he held until December 2006.

Lund was elected to his sixth term representing the constituency of Rocky Mountain House in the 2008 provincial election, where he received 62 per cent of the votes. He was the chair of the Regulatory Secretariat and deputy chair of the Legislative Offices Committee and Select Special Information and Privacy Commissioner Search Committee. He was also a member of the Alaska/Alberta Bilateral Council, the Council of State Governments–West: Trade and Transportation, and the Standing Committee on Energy.

== Personal life ==
Lund was active in his community. He was the coordinator of the Civil Air Rescue Emergency Services (Canadian Air Rescue) and treasurer of the Immanuel Evangelical Lutheran Church's parish. Lund was also a member of the Rocky Mountain House Agricultural Society, as well as of local chapters of the 4-H Club, the Kinsmen Club and the Rotary Club. He died on February 28, 2021, at the age of 82 in Rimbey, Alberta.

== Election results ==
1989 Alberta general election: Rocky Mountain House
Party	Candidate	Votes	%	±%
Progressive Conservative	Ty Lund	4,392	59.81%	6.50%
New Democratic	Dolly (Martin) Brown	1,727	23.52%	5.96%
Liberal	Bob Paston	1,224	16.67%	8.04%
Total		7,343	–	–
Rejected, spoiled and declined		27	–	–
Eligible electors / turnout		13,733	53.67%	0.77%
Progressive Conservative hold		Swing		0.27%
Source(s) Source: "Rocky Mountain House Official Results 1989 Alberta general election". Alberta Heritage Community Foundation.

1993 Alberta general election: Rocky Mountain House
Party	Candidate	Votes	%	±%
Progressive Conservative	Ty Lund	5,192	55.79%	-4.03%
Social Credit	Lavern J. Ahlstrom	2,330	25.03%	–
Liberal	Roxanne V. Prior	1,181	12.69%	-3.98%
New Democratic	Drew Ludington	604	6.49%	-17.03%
Total		9,307	–	–
Rejected, spoiled and declined		16	–	–
Eligible electors / turnout		15,062	61.90%	8.23%
Progressive Conservative hold		Swing		-2.77%
Source(s) Source: "Rocky Mountain House Official Results 1993 Alberta general election". Alberta Heritage Community Foundation.

1997 Alberta general election: Rocky Mountain House
Party	Candidate	Votes	%	±%
Progressive Conservative	Ty Lund	5,610	54.81%	-0.97%
Social Credit	Lavern J. Ahlstrom	3,264	31.89%	6.86%
Liberal	Roxanne Prior	880	8.60%	-4.09%
New Democratic	Christine McMeckan	481	4.70%	-1.79%
Total		10,235	–	–
Rejected, spoiled and declined		22	–	–
Eligible electors / turnout		18,464	55.55%	-6.35%
Progressive Conservative hold		Swing		-3.91%
Source(s) Source: "Rocky Mountain House Official Results 1997 Alberta general election". Alberta Heritage Community Foundation.

2001 Alberta general election: Rocky Mountain House
Party	Candidate	Votes	%	±%
Progressive Conservative	Ty Lund	7,820	70.43%	15.61%
Social Credit	Lavern J. Ahlstrom	1,705	15.35%	-16.54%
Liberal	Wijnand Horemans	1,171	10.55%	1.95%
New Democratic	Doug Mac Angus	408	3.67%	-1.03%
Total		11,104	–	–
Rejected, spoiled and declined		25	–	–
Eligible electors / turnout		20,051	55.50%	-0.05%
Progressive Conservative hold		Swing		16.07%
Source(s) Source: "Rocky Mountain House Official Results 2001 Alberta general election". Alberta Heritage Community Foundation.

2004 Alberta general election: Rocky Mountain House
Party	Candidate	Votes	%	±%
Progressive Conservative	Ty Lund	5,773	56.33%	-14.10%
Liberal	Susan M. Scott	1,266	12.35%	1.81%
Social Credit	Lavern J. Ahlstrom	1,265	12.34%	-3.01%
Alberta Alliance	Ed Wilhite	807	7.87%	–
Separation	Bruce Hutton	503	4.91%	–
Greens	Jennifer Isaac	335	3.27%	–
New Democratic	Anthony Jones	300	2.93%	-0.75%
Total		10,249	–	–
Rejected, spoiled and declined		40	–	–
Eligible electors / turnout		21,587	47.66%	-7.84%
Progressive Conservative hold		Swing		-5.55%
Source(s) Source: "Rocky Mountain House Statement of Official Results 2004 Alberta general election" (PDF). Elections Alberta.

2008 Alberta general election: Rocky Mountain House
Party	Candidate	Votes	%	±%
Progressive Conservative	Ty Lund	6,188	62.30%	5.97%
Wildrose Alliance	Fanie Van Heerden	1,156	11.64%	3.77%
Liberal	Norm McDougall	849	8.55%	-3.81%
Green	Jennifer Ripley	699	7.04%	3.77%
Social Credit	Wilf Tricker	643	6.47%	-5.87%
New Democratic	Jorge Sousa	279	2.81%	-0.12%
Separation	Bruce Hutton	119	1.20%	-3.71%
Total		9,933	–	–
Rejected, spoiled and declined		40	–	–
Eligible electors / turnout		22,934	43.49%	-4.18%
Progressive Conservative hold		Swing		3.34%
Source(s) The Report on the March 3, 2008 Provincial General Election of the Twenty-seventh Legislative Assembly. Elections Alberta. July 28, 2008. pp. 518–523. "Elections Alberta 2008 General Election". Elections Alberta.

2012 Alberta general election: Rimbey-Rocky Mountain House-Sundre
Party	Candidate	Votes	%	±%
Wildrose Alliance	Joe Anglin	7,664	51.42%	–
Progressive Conservative	Ty Lund	6,044	40.55%	–
New Democratic	Doreen Broska	776	5.21%	–
Liberal	Mason Sisson	420	2.82%	–
Total		14,904	–	–
Rejected, spoiled and declined		57	33	8
Eligible electors / turnout		27,863	53.72%	–
Wildrose Alliance pickup new district.				
Source(s) Source: "77 - Rimbey-Rocky Mountain House-Sundre, 2012 Alberta general election". officialresults.elections.ab.ca. Elections Alberta. Chief Electoral Officer (2012). The Report of the Chief Electoral Officer on the 2011 Provincial Enumeration and Monday, April 23, 2012 Provincial General Election of the Twenty-eighth Legislative Assembly (PDF) (Report). Edmonton, Alta.: Elections Alberta. pp. 456–458. Archived (PDF) from the original on May 6, 2021.
