= 2004 Alberta general election =

- November 22, 2004

83 seats in the Legislative Assembly of Alberta 42 seats needed for a majority
- Turnout: 45.12%
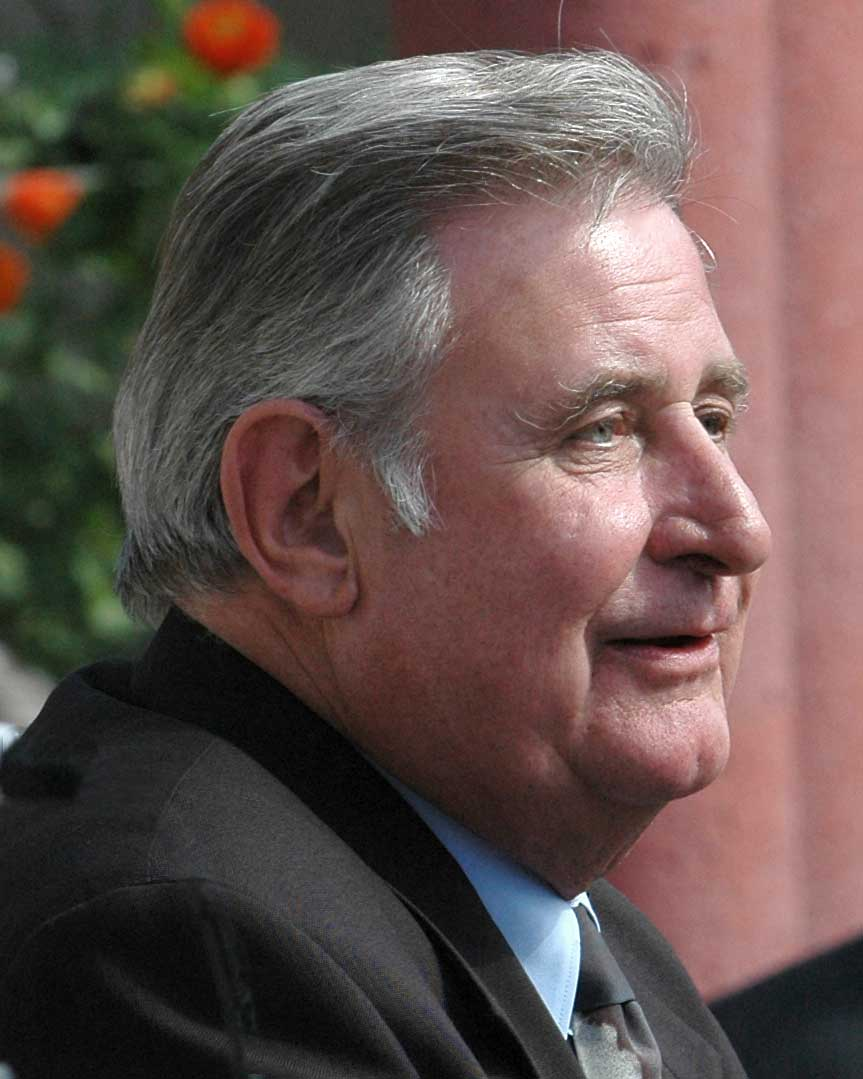

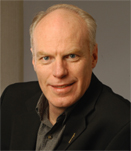

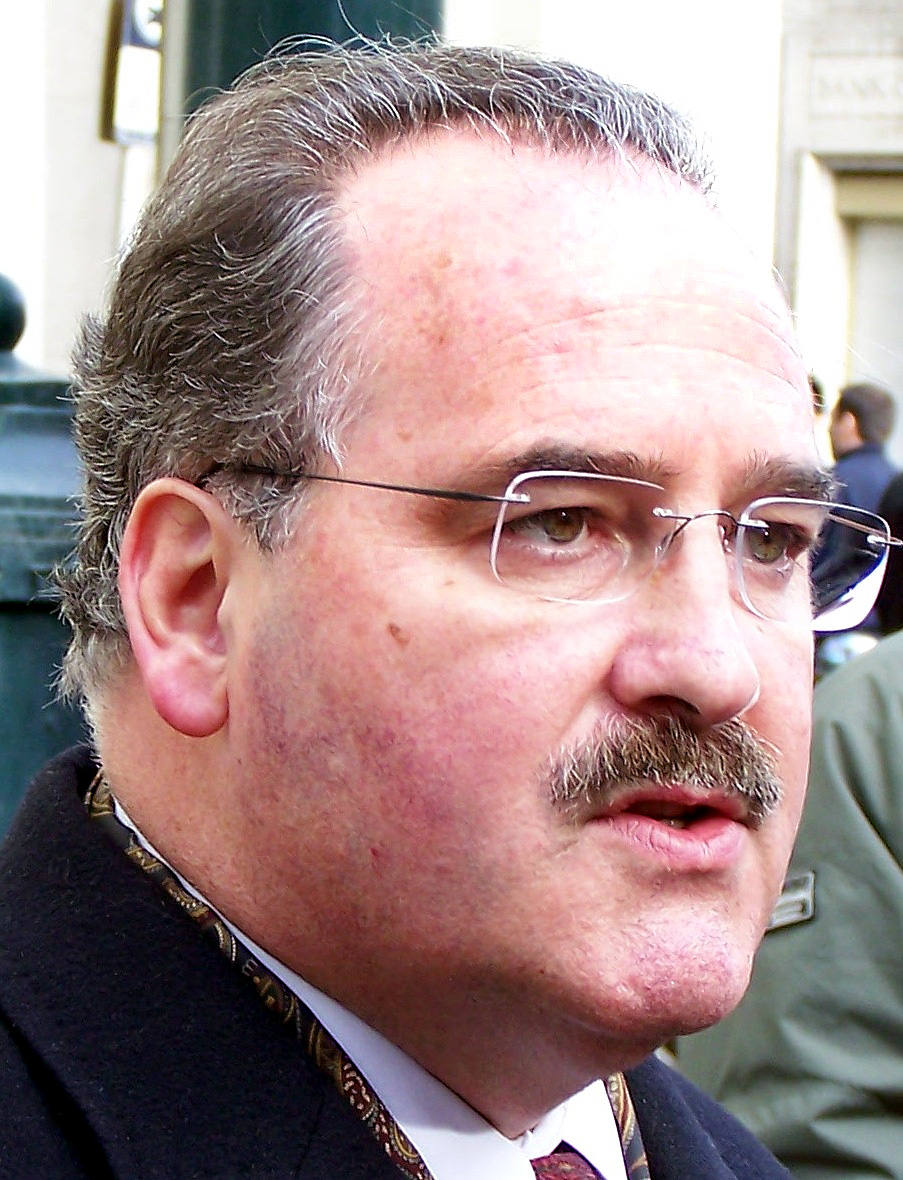
	Majority party	Minority party
Leader	Ralph Klein	Kevin Taft
Party	Progressive Conservative	Liberal
Leader since	December 14, 1992	March 27, 2004
Leader's seat	Calgary-Elbow	Edmonton-Riverview
Last election	74 seats, 61.9%	7 seats, 27.3%
Seats before	73	5
Seats won	62	16
Seat change	▼11	▲11
Popular vote	417,092	261,471
Percentage	46.8%	29.4%
Swing	▼15.1%	▲2.1%
	Third party	Fourth party
		AA
Leader	Brian Mason	Randy Thorsteinson
Party	New Democratic	Alberta Alliance
Leader since	July 13, 2004	February 15, 2003
Leader's seat	Edmonton-Highlands-Norwood	Ran in Innisfail-Sylvan Lake (lost)
Last election	2 seats, 8.0%	pre-creation
Seats before	2	1
Seats won	4	1
Seat change	▲2	±0
Popular vote	90,897	77,506
Percentage	10.2%	8.7%
Swing	▲2.2%	—
- Popular vote by riding. As this is a first-past-the-post election, seat totals are not determined by total popular vote, but instead by results in each riding.
Premier before election
Ralph Klein
Progressive Conservative
Premier after election
Ralph Klein
Progressive Conservative

The 2004 Alberta general election was held on November 22, 2004 to elect members of the Legislative Assembly of Alberta.

The election was called on October 25, 2004. Premier Ralph Klein decided to go to the polls earlier than the legislated deadline of March 2006. This election was held in conjunction with the 2004 Alberta Senate nominee election.

When the election was called, it was expected to be anticlimactic, with Klein cruising to his fourth straight majority, the tenth for his Progressive Conservative Party.

Shortly after the drop of the writs, Klein's mother died and all parties suspended their campaigns for several days. After the campaign resumed, Klein avoided making any policy announcements and attended few events. One commentator called it "Kleinfeld: the campaign about nothing" (a reference to the television sitcom Seinfeld). The Liberal Party, which had hoped to hold on to the five seats it had and regain the two seats that it had lost to resignations, began to pick up momentum and became far more optimistic.

In the end, the Conservatives were re-elected, despite losing 11 seats and 15% of the popular vote, having dropped to a minority position in the polls. The Liberals more than doubled their seats by electing 17 MLAs on election night The Liberals dominated in Edmonton and made strong inroads in Calgary.

The Alberta New Democrats (NDP) held on to their two seats and gained two more, all in Edmonton.

The Conservatives swept rural Alberta except for one seat that went to the Alberta Alliance, which also placed second in a number of rural ridings. The Conservatives received no more than 56 per cent of the vote in any of the three rural regions so was very much over-represented by its almost-total one-party sweep of the rural seats.

The Alberta Greens gained in the popular vote, jumping from 0.3% in the 2001 election to 2.8%, and placed third in some places. Despite placing second in the riding of Drayton Valley-Calmar ahead of the Liberals, it did not win any seats.

Social Credit placed third in a number of ridings, and its leader tied for second in Rocky Mountain House.

The Conservative, Liberal and NDP leaders all easily held onto their own seats.

== Electoral System ==
Alberta's 83 MLAs were elected through First-past-the-post voting in 83 single-member districts.

== Election night summary ==
Overall voter turnout was 45.12%.

Party	Party leader	# of candidates	Seats				Popular vote		
Party	Party leader	# of candidates	2001	Dissolution	Elected	% Change	#	%	% Change
Progressive Conservative	Ralph Klein	83	74	73	62^{2}	-15.1%	416,886	46.8%	-15.1%
Liberal	Kevin Taft	82	7	5	16^{2}	+220%	261,737	29.4%	+2.1%
NDP	Brian Mason	83	2	2	4	+100%	90,829	10.2%	+2.1%
Alberta Alliance	Randy Thorsteinson	83	*	1	1	-	77,466	8.7%	*
Green	George Read	49	-	-	-	-	24,451	2.8%	+2.5%
Social Credit	Lavern Ahlstrom	42	-	-	-	-	10,998	1.2%	+0.7%
Separation	Bruce Hutton	12	*	-	-	-	4,695	0.5%	-0.37%^{1}
Alberta Party	Bruce Stubbs	4	*	-	-	-	2,481	0.3%	*
Independent		10	-	-	-	-	994	0.1%	-0.9%
Communist	Naomi Rankin	2	-	-	-	-	98	<0.1%	~0%
Vacant			*	2					
Total		450	83	83	83	-	890,635	100%	

Note:

* The Alberta Alliance and Alberta Party did not contest the 2001 election.
^{1} The Separation Party results are compared to the Alberta First Party.
^{2} A judicial recount changed the results in Edmonton Castle Downs, Liberal. Chris Kibermanis lost to Progressive Conservative Thomas Lukaszuk.

Popular vote
PC	46.81%
Liberal	29.39%
New Democratic	10.20%
Alliance	8.70%
Others	4.90%

Seats summary
PC	74.70%
Liberal	19.28%
New Democratic	4.82%
Alliance	1.20%

== Results by region ==
Party name		Cgy.	Edm.^{1}	Leth.	R.D.	North	Central	South	Total
Progressive Conservative	Seats:	20	3	1	2	10	19	7	61
Progressive Conservative	Popular vote:	50.5%	31.5%	38.3%	44.1%	55.5%	52.7%	55.1%	46.8%
Liberal	Seats:	3	11	1			1		16
Liberal	Popular vote:	32.1%	40.3%	37.9%	32.5%	19.8%	21.9%	19.1%	29.4%
New Democrats	Seats:		4						4
New Democrats	Popular vote:	4.9%	22.0%	8.1%	6.1%	8.6%	7.9%	4.4%	10.2%
Alberta Alliance	Seats:							1	1
Alberta Alliance	Popular vote:	6.5%	4.2%	10.2%	14.9%	13.8%	11.3%	13.1%	8.7%
Total seats:		23	18	2	2	10	20	8	83
Parties that won no seats:
Green	Popular vote:	5.5%	1.0%	3.1%	1.2%	1.1%	2.5%	2.1%	2.8%
Social Credit	Popular vote:	0.3%	0.8%	2.6%	-	1.1%	2.3%	2.4%	1.2%
Separation	Popular Vote:	0.2%	-	-	1.3%	-	0.9%	2.6%	0.5%
Alberta Party	Popular vote:	<0.1%	-	-	-	-	0.6%	1.3%	0.3%
Communist	Popular vote:	<0.1%	<0.1%	-	-	-	-	-	<0.1%
Independents	Popular vote:	0.1%	0.2%	-	-	0.1%	0.1%	-	0.1%

^{1} "Edmonton" corresponds to only the city of Edmonton. (Only the ridings whose names begin with "Edmonton".) The four suburban ridings around the city as listed below are grouped with Central Alberta in this table.

== Results by riding ==
=== Results by riding ===
**Party**	Seats	Second	Third	Fourth	Fifth	Sixth—
Progressive Conservative	62	20	1	0	0	0
Liberal	16	50	16	0	0	0
New Democratic Party	4	2	29	27	18	3
Alberta Alliance	1	10	26	37	9	0
Green	0	1	9	12	23	4
Social Credit	0	0	1	3	17	21
Separation	0	0	0	2	4	6
Alberta Party	0	0	1	2	0	1

Names in bold indicate party leaders and cabinet ministers.

=== Northern Alberta ===
Electoral District	Candidates						Incumbent
Electoral District	PC	Liberal	NDP	Alliance	Green	Other	Incumbent
Athabasca-Redwater	**Mike Cardinal**; 5,706	Nicole Belland; 3,258	Peter Opryshko; 1,407	Sean Whelan; 1,174	Luke de Smet; 252	Leonard Fish (Soc. Cred.) 179	**Mike Cardinal**; Athabasca-Wabasca
Athabasca-Redwater	**Mike Cardinal**; 5,706	Nicole Belland; 3,258	Peter Opryshko; 1,407	Sean Whelan; 1,174	Luke de Smet; 252	Leonard Fish (Soc. Cred.) 179	merged district
Athabasca-Redwater	**Mike Cardinal**; 5,706	Nicole Belland; 3,258	Peter Opryshko; 1,407	Sean Whelan; 1,174	Luke de Smet; 252	Leonard Fish (Soc. Cred.) 179	Dave Broda†; Redwater
Barrhead-Morinville-Westlock	Ken Kowalski; 6,967	Alan Fiebich; 2,250	Peggy Kirkeby; 1,098	Mike Radojcic; 1,012		Carl Haugen (Soc. Cred.) 404	Ken Kowalski; Barrhead-Westlock
Bonnyville-Cold Lake	Denis Ducharme; 3,621	Lloyd Mildon; 797	Denise Ogonoski; 312	Shane Gervais; 955			Denis Ducharme
Dunvegan-Central Peace	Hector Goudreau; 3,670	Don Thompson; 689	Leon R. Pendleton; 446	Dale Lueken; 3,332		Lanny Portsmouth (Soc. Cred.) 118	Hector Goudreau; Dunvegan
Fort McMurray-Wood Buffalo	**Guy Boutilier**; 4,429	Russell Collicott; 1,800	Dave Malka; 460	Eugene Eklund; 224		Reginald Normore (Ind.) 94	**Guy Boutilier**; Fort McMurray
Grande Prairie-Smoky	Mel Knight; 4,369	Neil Peacock; 1,965	Georgina Szoke; 724	Hank Rahn; 688			Mel Knight
Grande Prairie-Wapiti	Gordon Graydon; 4,348	Cibylla Rakestraw; 1,677	Jerry Macdonald; 972	John Hilton-O'Brien; 547	Allan Webber; 348		Gordon Graydon
Lac La Biche-St. Paul	Ray Danyluk; 4,898	Dickson Broomfield; 1,877	Phil Goebel; 648	Oscar Lacombe; 1,703			Ray Danyluk
Lesser Slave Lake	**Pearl Calahasen**; 3,894	Jonathan Pleckaitis; 530	Doris Bannister; 354	Valerie Rahn; 977	Ian Hopfe; 254		**Pearl Calahasen**
Peace River	Frank Oberle; 2,888	Adam Bourque; 1,101	Stephen Crocker; 558	Gary Checknita; 541		Patsy Lindberg (Soc. Cred.) 204	Gary Friedel†

=== Western and Central Alberta ===
Electoral District	Candidates						Incumbent
Electoral District	PC	Liberal	NDP	Alliance	Green	Other	Incumbent
Banff-Cochrane	Janis Tarchuk; 4,236	Ian McDougall; 1,649	Melissa Cambridge; 468	Bob Argent; 476	Chris Foote; 1,205		Janis Tarchuk
Drayton Valley-Calmar	Tony Abbott; 5,231	Laura Higgerty; 890	Lynn Oberle; 641	Viona Cunningham; 764	Edwin Erickson; 927	Thomas Cliff (Soc. Cred.) 244 Elmer Knopp (Ind.) 115	Tony Abbott
Foothills-Rocky View	Ted Morton; 6,770	Herb Coburn; 1,954	Roland Schmidt; 232	Jason Herasemluk; 1,081	Shelley Willson; 1,186		New district
Innisfail-Sylvan Lake	Luke Ouellette; 6,206	Garth Davis; 1,816	Chris Janke; 585	Randy Thorsteinson; 2,242		Wilf Tricker (Soc. Cred.) 349	Luke Ouellette
Olds-Didsbury-Three Hills	Richard Marz; 7,277	Tony Vonesch; 1,336	Christopher Davies; 257	Gordon Quantz; 2,021	Sarah Henckel-Sutmoller; 469	Brian Vasseur (Sep. Pty.) 746; Myrna Kissick (Soc. Cred.) 143	Richard Marz
Red Deer-North	Mary Anne Jablonski; 3,736	Norm McDougall; 2,640	Steven Bedford; 430	Rand Sisson; 1,660	Colin Fisher; 244		Mary Anne Jablonski
Red Deer-South	**Victor Doerksen**; 5,371	Walter Kubanek; 4,073	Jeff Sloychuk; 836	Patti Argent; 1,418		Judy Milne (Sep. Pty.) 261	**Victor Doerksen**
Rocky Mountain House	**Ty Lund**; 5,773	Susan M. Scott; 1,267	Anthony Jones; 300	Ed Wilhite; 810	Jennifer Isaac; 337	Lavern Ahlstrom (Soc. Cred.) 1,267; Bruce Hutton (Sep. Pty.) 505	**Ty Lund**
Stony Plain	Fred Lindsay; 5,644	Bill Fraser; 3,402	Ruth Yanor; 1,375	Marilyn Burns; 1,878		Henry Neumann (Soc. Cred.) 245	**Stan Woloshyn**†
West Yellowhead	Ivan Strang; 3,769	Rob Jolly; 1,682	Barry Madsen; 1,783	Earl Cunningham; 615	Monika Schaefer; 360		Ivan Strang
Whitecourt-Ste. Anne	George VanderBurg; 5,071	George Higgerty; 1,219	Leah Redmond; 996	David Dow; 2,333			George VanderBurg

=== East Central Alberta ===
Electoral District	Candidates						Incumbent
Electoral District	PC	Liberal	NDP	Alliance	Green	Other	Incumbent
Battle River-Wainwright	Doug Griffiths; 6,409	Gordon Rogers; 1,069	Len Legault; 616	Orest Werzak; 1,440		Robin Skitteral (Soc. Cred.) 319	Doug Griffiths; Wainwright
Drumheller-Stettler	**Shirley McClellan**; 6,770		Richard Bough; 890	Dave France; 1,413		Eileen Walker (Ab Pty.) 616; Dave Carnegie (Sep. Pty.) 465; Mary-Lou Kloppenburg (Soc. Cred.) 279	**Shirley McClellan**; Drumheller-Chinook
Fort Saskatchewan-Vegreville	**Ed Stelmach**; 6,160	Peter Schneider; 3,160	Wes Buyarski; 1,633	Byron King; 1,411		Mark Patterson (Soc. Cred.) 379	**Ed Stelmach**; Vegreville-Viking
Lacombe-Ponoka	Ray Prins; 6,919	Glen Simmonds; 2,218	Jim Graves; 1,124	Ed Klop; 2,349		Teena Cormack (Soc. Cred.) 467	Judy Gordon
Lacombe-Ponoka	Ray Prins; 6,919	Glen Simmonds; 2,218	Jim Graves; 1,124	Ed Klop; 2,349		Teena Cormack (Soc. Cred.) 467	Merged district
Lacombe-Ponoka	Ray Prins; 6,919	Glen Simmonds; 2,218	Jim Graves; 1,124	Ed Klop; 2,349		Teena Cormack (Soc. Cred.) 467	**Halvar Jonson**
Leduc-Beaumont-Devon	George Rogers; 6,809	Joyce Assen; 3,425	Katie Oppen; 904	Dave Dalke; 1,140	Stephen Lindop; 381	Karen Richert (Soc. Cred.) 249	Albert Klapstein†; Leduc
Vermilion-Lloydminster	Lloyd Snelgrove; 5,464	Patricia Thomas; 706	Ray Stone; 553	David Benoit; 2,437			Lloyd Snelgrove
Wetaskiwin-Camrose	LeRoy Johnson; 6,177	Keith Elliott; 2,713	Clay Lawson; 908	Dale Trefz; 1,193		Janice Wolter (Soc. Cred.) 309	LeRoy Johnson

=== Central Edmonton ===
Electoral district	Candidates						Incumbent
Electoral district	PC	Liberal	NDP	Alliance	Green	Other	Incumbent
Edmonton Beverly Clareview	Julius Yankowsky; 3,059	Sam Parmar; 1,166	Ray Martin; 5,268	Phil Gamache; 457	Benoit Couture; 141	Ken Shipka (Soc. Cred.); 283	Julius Yankowsky
Edmonton Centre	Don Weideman; 2,622	Laurie Blakeman; 6,236	Mary Elizabeth Archer; 1,538	Tony Caterina; 264	David J. Parker; 336	Linda Clements (Soc. Cred.); 111	Laurie Blakeman
Edmonton-Glenora	Drew Hutton; 3,758	Bruce Miller; 4,610	Larry Booi; 4,059	Blaine Currie; 307	Peter Johnston; 272	Walter Schachenhofer (Soc. Cred.); 112	Drew Hutton
Edmonton Gold Bar	Manjit Dhaliwal; 2,574	Hugh MacDonald; 8,794	Keith Turnbull; 1,966	Delmar Hunt; 538		Dave Dowling (Ind.); 167	Hugh MacDonald
Edmonton Highlands-Norwood	Terry Martiniuk; 2,209	Jason Manzevich; 1,035	**Brian Mason**; 6,053	Ray Loyer; 315		Dale W. Ferris (Ind.); 66	**Brian Mason**
Edmonton Mill Creek	**Gene Zwozdesky**; 5,071	Aman Gill; 4,286	Nathan Taylor; 1,709	Robert Alford; 523	Eric Steiglitz; 386	Cameron Johnson (Ind.); 72	**Gene Zwozdesky**
Edmonton-Mill Woods	Naresh Bhardwaj; 2,989	Weslyn Mather; 5,014	Lloyd Nelson; 1,565	Charles Relland; 816		**Naomi Rankin** (Communist); 42	Don Massey
Edmonton Riverview	Fred Horne; 3,571	**Kevin Taft**; 10,279	Donna Martyn; 1,053	David Edgar; 315	John Lackey; 355	Dave W. Power (Soc. Cred.); 111	**Kevin Taft**
Edmonton Rutherford	Ian McClelland; 4,173	Rick Miller; 7,217	George A. Slade; 995	R. J. (Bob) Ewart; 516		Anit Ashmore (Soc. Cred.); 210	Ian McClelland
Edmonton-Strathcona	Shannon Stubbs; 2,256	Steven Leard; 1,850	Raj Pannu; 7,430	Jeremy Burns; 275	Adrian Cole; 287	Kelly Graham (Soc. Cred.); 162	Raj Pannu

=== Suburban Edmonton and Environs ===
Electoral district	Candidates						Incumbent
Electoral district	PC	Liberal	NDP	Alliance	Green	Other	Incumbent
Edmonton-Calder	Brent Rathgeber; 3,680	Brad Smith; 3,028	David Eggen; 4,055	Vicki Kramer; 526			Brent Rathgeber
Edmonton Castle Downs Election Recount	Thomas Lukaszuk; 5,014	Chris Kibermanis; 5,019	Peter Cross; 1,317	Colin Presizniuk; 583		Ross Korpi (Soc. Cred.); 78	Thomas Lukaszuk
Edmonton Castle Downs Election Recount	5,022	5,019	1,314	586		78	Thomas Lukaszuk
Edmonton Decore	Walter Szwender; 3,033	Bill Bonko; 4,418	Shirley Barg 1,524	Gary Masyk; 830		Geoffrey Chevrier (Soc. Cred.); 94	Bill Bonner
Edmonton Decore	Walter Szwender; 3,033	Bill Bonko; 4,418	Shirley Barg 1,524	Gary Masyk; 830		Geoffrey Chevrier (Soc. Cred.); 94	merged district
Edmonton Decore	Walter Szwender; 3,033	Bill Bonko; 4,418	Shirley Barg 1,524	Gary Masyk; 830		Geoffrey Chevrier (Soc. Cred.); 94	Gary Masyk
Edmonton Ellerslie	Gurnam Dodd; 3,245	Bharat Agnihotri; 3,444	Marilyn Assheton-Smith; 2,257	Eleanor Maroes; 985		Amelia Maciejewski (Soc. Cred.); 238	vacant
Edmonton-Manning	Tony Vandermeer; 3,646	Dan Backs; 3,873	Laurie Lang; 2,371	Mike Pietramala; 515	Ross Adshead; 240	Sean Tisdall (Soc. Cred.); 130	Tony Vandermeer
Edmonton McClung	**Mark Norris**; 5,331	Mo Elsalhy; 5,864	Lorne Dach; 1,362	Reuben Bauer; 401		Patrick Conlin (Soc. Cred.); 104	**Mark Norris**
Edmonton Meadowlark	Bob Maskell; 4,243	Maurice Tougas; 4,436	Lance Burns; 1,303	Aaron Campbell; 444	Amanda Doyle; 245	Peggy Morton (Ind.); 77	Bob Maskell
Edmonton-Whitemud	**Dave Hancock**; 7,493	Donna L. Smith; 6,567	Brian Fleck; 1,634	Kathy Rayner; 469		John Andrews (Ind.); 76	**David Hancock**
Sherwood Park	**Iris Evans**; 7,276	Louise Rogers; 5,587	Tim Sloan; 994	Cora LaBonte; 444	Lynn Lau; 362	Gordon Barrett (Soc. Cred.); 474	**Iris Evans**
Spruce Grove-Sturgeon-St. Albert	Doug Horner; 6,140	Ray Boudreau; 5,559	Dale Apostal; 1,020	Tim Friesen; 740		Glen Blaylock (Soc. Cred.); 170	Doug Horner
St. Albert	Mary O'Neill; 6,064	Jack Flaherty; 6,474	Travis Thompson; 1,652	Michaela Meldrum; 591	Conrad Bitangcol; 407		Mary O'Neill
Strathcona	Rob Lougheed; 6,838	Jon Friel; 4,115	Tom Elchuk; 1,177	Ryan Seto; 466		**Bruce Stubbs** (Ab. Pty.); 775; Brian Rembowski (Soc. Cred.); 327; Roberta McDonald (Separation); 297	Recreated District

=== Southern Alberta ===
Electoral district	Candidates						Incumbent
Electoral district	PC	Liberal	NDP	Alliance	Green	Other	Incumbent
Airdrie-Chestermere	Carol Haley; 6,842	John Burke; 1,633	Grant Massie; 569	Bradley Gaida; 758	Angela Scully; 434	Jeff Willerton (Alberta Pty.); 1,036; Bob Lefurgey (Separation); 394; Jerry Gautreau (Soc. Cred.); 178	Carol Haley
Cardston-Taber-Warner	Broyce Jacobs; 3,753	Paula Shimp; 783	Luann Bannister; 185	Paul Hinman; 3,884	Lindsay Ferguson; 225		Broyce Jacobs
Cypress-Medicine Hat	Leonard Mitzel; 4,623	Stuart Angle; 2,234	Cliff Anten; 345	Dan H. Pierson; 651		Eric Solberg (Soc. Cred.); 561	**Lorne Taylor**
Highwood	George Groeneveld; 6,782	Lori Czerwinski; 1,843	Catherine Whelan Costen; 432	Brian Wickhorst; 733	Sheelagh Matthews; 547	Cory Morgan (Separation); 299	Don Tannas
Lethbridge-East	Rod Fong; 4,703	Bridget Pastoor; 5,340	Gaye Metz; 607	Brian Stewart; 1,472	Erin Matthews; 360	Darren Popik (Soc. Cred.); 251	vacant
Lethbridge-West	**Clint Dunford**; 4,416	Bal Boora; 3,675	Mark Sandilands; 1,316	Merle Terlesky; 949	Andrea Sheridan; 368	Scott Sawatsky (Soc. Cred.); 357	**Clint Dunford**
Little Bow	Barry McFarland; 4,894	Arij Langstraat; 1,965	Hugh Logie; 327	Jay Phin; 859		Brian Cook (Soc. Cred.); 556; Grant Shaw (Separation); 432	Barry McFarland
Livingstone-Macleod	**David Coutts**; 5,095	Craig Whitehead; 2,030	Joyce Thomas; 626	George Lyster; 1,493	Chris Watts; 468	Jim Walker (Separation); 339	**David Coutts**
Medicine Hat	Rob Renner; 5,392	Karen Charlton; 3,482	Diana Arnott; 560	Scott Cowan; 1,073		Jonathan Lorentzen (Soc. Cred.); 246	Rob Renner
Strathmore-Brooks	**Lyle Oberg**; 6,051	Carol Jacques; 1,055	Don MacFarlane; 405	Mark D. Ogden; 852		Jay Kolody (Separation); 559; Rudy Martens (Soc. Cred.); 313	**Lyle Oberg**

=== Suburban Calgary ===
Electoral district	Candidates						Incumbent
Electoral district	PC	Liberal	NDP	Alliance	Green	Other	Incumbent
Calgary-Bow	Alana DeLong; 6,097	Kelly McDonnell; 3,509	Jennifer Banks; 1,135	James Istvanffy; 1,015	Marie Picken; 713	Margaret Askin (Independent); 98; Doug Picken (Soc. Cred.); 97	Alana DeLong
Calgary-Cross	Yvonne Fritz; 3,763	Raleigh DeHaney; 1,452	Jeanie Keebler; 391	Gordon Huth; 648	Ryan Richardson; 271		Yvonne Fritz
Calgary-Foothills	Len Webber; 5,820	Stephen Jenuth; 3,559	Malcolm Forster; 407	Vincent S. Jansen-Van Doorn; 472			**Pat Nelson**
Calgary-Fort	Wayne Cao; 4,136	Gerry Hart; 1,784	Elizabeth Thomas; 583	Travis Chase; 589	Tyler Charkie; 440	Leo Ollenberger (Separation); 212	Wayne Cao
Calgary-Hays	Arthur Johnston; 5,529	Sharon Howe; 1,952	Rachel Weinfeld; 298	Robert Wawrzynowski; 534	Bernie Amell; 378		new district
Calgary-Lougheed	David Rodney; 6,334	Allan Pollock; 2,971	Matthew Koczkur; 365	Tariq Khan; 445	Ryan Boucher; 471		Marlene Graham
Calgary-Mackay	**Gary Mar**; 5,640	Darryl Hawkins; 2,615	Giorgio Cattabeni; 395	Shawn Hubbard; 640	David McTavish; 443	Paul Martin (Independent); 193	**Gary Mar**
Calgary-McCall	Shiraz Shariff; 3,203	Darshan Kang; 2,958	Gurpreet (Preet) Sihota; 264	Ina Givens; 573	Sean Robert Brocklesby; 359		Shiraz Shariff
Calgary-Montrose	Hung Pham; 3,318	Arthur Danielson; 1,651	Jason Nishiyama; 434	Cyril Collingwood; 674	Kevin Colton; 355		Hung Pham
Calgary-North West	**Greg Melchin**; 7,768	Judy Stewart; 4,488	Bob Brunet; 518	Jenell Friesen; 622	Jeffrey Krekoski; 636		**Greg Melchin**
Calgary-Shaw	Cindy Ady; 6,732	John Roggeveen; 2,373	Jarrett Young; 300	Barry Chase; 620	Rick Papineau; 380	Daniel Doherty (Separation); 171	Cindy Ady
Calgary-West	Ron Liepert; 6,964	Derek Smith; 4,286	Chantelle Dubois; 434	John Keyes; 988	James Kohut; 732		Karen Kryczka

=== Central Calgary ===
Electoral district	Candidates						Incumbent
Electoral district	PC	Liberal	NDP	Alliance	Green	Other	Incumbent
Calgary-Buffalo	Harvey Cenaiko; 3,370	Terry Taylor; 2,777	Cliff Hesby; 455	Nadine Hunka; 290	Grant Neufeld; 656	Elizabeth Kaur Fielding (Soc. Cred.); 71; Carl Schwartz (Alberta Pty.); 58	Harvey Cenaiko
Calgary-Currie	Jon Lord; 4,413	Dave Taylor; 4,984	Robert Scobel; 468	Ken Mazeroll; 348	Kim Warnke; 810		Jon Lord
Calgary-East	Moe Amery; 4,492	Bill Harvey; 2,359	Paul Vargis; 461	Brad Berard; 605	Rick Michalenko; 367	Bonnie-Jean Collins (Communist); 56	Moe Amery
Calgary-Egmont	Denis Herard; 5,691	Michael Queenan; 2,371	Christopher Dovey; 599	David Crutcher; 1,657	**George Read**; 914		Denis Herard
Calgary-Elbow	**Ralph Klein**; 6,968	Stephen Brown; 4,934	Becky Kelley; 343	Diana-Lynn Brooks; 485	Allison Roth; 666	Trevor Grover (Soc. Cred.); 68; Lloyd Blimke (Ind.); 51	**Ralph Klein**
Calgary-Fish Creek	**Heather Forsyth**; 6,829	Tore Badenduck; 2,801	Eric Leavitt; 794	Mike Kuipers; 780	Chris Sealy; 561		**Heather Forsyth**
Calgary-Glenmore	**Ron Stevens**; 6,257	Avalon Roberts; 4,360	Holly Heffernan; 550	Ernest McCutcheon; 572	Evan Sklarski; 531	Larry R. Heather (Soc. Cred.); 135	**Ron Stevens**
Calgary-Mountain View	Mark Hlady; 4,058	David Swann; 7,155	John Donovan; 711	Ryan Cassell; 589	Mark MacGillivray; 912		Mark Hlady
Calgary-North Hill	Richard Magnus; 4,384	Pat Murray; 3,223	Aileen L. Machell; 630	Brent Best; 627	Susan Stratton; 1,264		Richard Magnus
Calgary-Nose Hill	Neil Brown; 4,369	Len Borowski; 2,605	Dirk Huysman; 552	Bill McGregor; 1,073	John Johnson; 584	Raymond Hurst (Soc. Cred.); 163	new district
Calgary-Varsity	Michael W. Smyth; 5,585	Harry B. Chase; 6,303	Mark Gabruch; 625	Ron Beninger; 763	Richard Larson; 753	Len Skowronski (Soc. Cred.); 118	**Murray Smith**

== Electoral re-distribution ==
Alberta's electoral laws fix the number of legislature seats at 83. As a result of the Alberta Electoral Boundary Re-distribution, 2004, Calgary gained two seats. Edmonton lost one seat, and one "special consideration" division was eliminated. Dunvegan-Central Peace is the sole remaining "special" division - due to its isolation, it is allowed to have a population below 75% of the provincial average. Lesser Slave Lake is now considered to be a standard rural division as its boundaries were re-drawn so that its population is slightly above 75% of the provincial average. One urbanized division outside Calgary and Edmonton was added, and two rural seats were eliminated.

== Political parties ==
For this election, there were 11 political parties registered with Elections Alberta.

=== Parties that elected MLAs in the previous election ===
The parties are listed in descending order of number of MLAs elected in 2001.

==== Progressive Conservative Party ====
Leader: Ralph Klein

In the 2001 election, the Progressive Conservatives recorded a result that was comparable to those achieved in their years of dominance under Peter Lougheed. The Tories received 627,252 out of 1,013,152 votes cast and won 74 seats, gaining 11 seats over and above their 1997 result at the expense of the Liberals. This result was achieved due to a resurgence of the party in Edmonton, where the Tories won a majority of seats for the first time since 1982. Premier Ralph Klein easily retained his Calgary-Elbow seat.

On April 8, 2002, Doug Griffiths retained the Tories' seat in Wainwright in the only by-election held since the 2001 election, albeit with a substantially reduced plurality. The Tories lost only one seat since the 2001 election, after Edmonton-Norwood MLA Gary Masyk crossed the floor to join the Alberta Alliance. As expected, the Tories nominated a full slate of candidates for the 2004 election.

External link

==== Liberal Party ====
Leader: Kevin Taft

The 2001 election was generally regarded to be as a disaster for the Liberals. Although the Liberals retained Official Opposition status and received 276,854 votes, the party lost 11 seats to the Tories and won only seven seats, six of them in Edmonton. Leader Nancy Macbeth even lost her own seat in Edmonton-McClung - she resigned days after the election and was replaced by Ken Nicol, the Opposition's sole representative outside the capital.

Nicol eventually resigned as MLA for Lethbridge East and as Leader of the Opposition to run (unsuccessfully) for the Liberals in the federal election, as did Edmonton-Ellerslie MLA Debby Carlson. These seats remained vacant through dissolution. The Liberals were led in the 2004 election by Edmonton-Riverview MLA Kevin Taft, who was elected to the position in March 2004. The Liberals had 82 candidates in the 2004 election - they were absent from the ballot in Drumheller-Stettler after failing to file papers for their expected candidate, Don McMann before the deadline.

External link

==== New Democratic Party ====
Leader: Brian Mason

In 2001, the New Democrats were unable to claim Official Opposition status from the floundering Liberals, but Leader Raj Pannu managed to hold the party's two existing seats—Pannu's own in Edmonton—Strathcona and Brian Mason's seat in Edmonton Highlands (later merged into Edmonton Highlands-Norwood). The "NDs", as they were then known, received 81,339 votes. Pannu resigned the leadership in July 2004, with Mason filling the role of interim leader before being elected to that position in September 2004. The party has also ceased abbreviating its name as "ND in favour of the more traditional "NDP" abbreviation. The NDP nominated a full slate of candidates for the 2004 election.

External link

=== Other registered parties ===
The parties are listed in descending order of number of candidates nominated in 2004.

==== Alberta Alliance ====
Leader: Randy Thorsteinson

The Alberta Alliance was registered in October 2002 and held its founding convention in February 2003. Its leader, Randy Thorsteinson had led Social Credit through a modest rebirth before quitting that party in April 1999. The party's sole MLA, Gary Masyk (Edmonton-Norwood) crossed the floor from the governing Progressive Conservatives on June 29, 2004. The Alliance nominated a full slate of candidates for the 2004 election, the only other party besides the Tories and the NDP to do so.

External link

==== Greens ====
Leader: George Read

Also known as the "Green Party of Alberta", the Alberta Greens ran 10 candidates in the 2001 election, who combined for 2,850 votes. In the 2004 election, the Greens nominated 49 candidates - more than 4 times the highest number of candidates they had previously run in an election.

External link

==== Social Credit Party ====
Leader: Lavern Ahlstrom

Prior to the 2001 election, the Social Credit Party was in turmoil following the departure of party leader Randy Thorsteinson. Under Lavern Ahlstrom, the party nominated 12 candidates in the 2001 election (down from 70 in 1997), and received 5,361 votes (down from 64,667). The party had 42 candidates for the 2004 election.

External link

==== Separation Party ====
Interim Leader: Bruce Hutton

The Separation Party of Alberta was founded in June 2004 taking over the rights of the Alberta First Party. Bruce Hutton became interim leader. As a separatist party, it is the separatist successor to the Alberta Independence Party, which ran some independent candidates in the 2001 election, but never achieved official party status. The separatist cause was first taken up by the Western Canada Concept in the early 1980s when Gordon Kesler won a by-election. The Separation Party had 12 candidates in the 2004 election. See Alberta separatism.

External Link

==== Alberta Party ====
Leader: Bruce Stubbs

The Alberta Party did not nominate any candidates in 2001, but nominated four candidates for the 2004 election.

External Link

==== Communist Party ====
Leader: Naomi Rankin

The Communist Party nominated two candidates in the 2001 election, who combined for 117 votes. They ran two candidates in the 2004 election.

==== The Equity Party ====
Leader: Emil van der Poorten

The Equity Party ran no candidates in this election, The party was de-registered after the Alberta government amended the Elections Act to force a party to run at least one candidate, the party failed to field a candidate and was de-registered.

==== Reform Party ====
Leader: David Salmon

The Alberta Party, Equity Party and the Reform Party did not run any candidates in the 2001 election. The Equity Party and Reform Party were also absent from the ballot in 2004. The party was de-registered after the Alberta government amended the Elections Act to force a party to run at least one candidate, the party failed to field a candidate and was de-registered.

=== De-registered parties ===
The Natural Law Party of Alberta was de-registered by Elections Alberta in 2001, after they stopped filing financial statements. In 2001 The Natural Law Party did not nominate any candidates.

=== Independent candidates ===
29 independent candidates ran in the 2001 election. These candidates won a total of 10,528 votes. 10 independents ran in 2004.

== Standings in the 25th Legislature ==
=== Standings after the 25th general election ===
Political party	Calgary	Edmonton	Urbanized	Rural	Special	Total
Progressive Conservative	21	11	20	20	2	74
Liberal	0	6	1	0	0	7
New Democrat	0	2	0	0	0	2
Totals	21	19	21	20	2	83

=== Standings at dissolution ===
Political party	Calgary	Edmonton	Urbanized	Rural	Special	Total
Progressive Conservative	21	10	20	20	2	73
Liberal	0	5	0	0	0	5
New Democrat	0	2	0	0	0	2
Alberta Alliance	0	1	0	0	0	1
Vacant	0	1	1	0	0	2
Totals	21	19	21	20	2	83

== Timeline ==
March 27, 2004 - Kevin Taft becomes leader of the Alberta Liberals.

June 29, 2004 - Gary Masyk crosses the floor from the Progressive Conservatives to the Alberta Alliance.

July 13, 2004 - Raj Pannu resigns as leader of the Alberta New Democrats. Brian Mason is appointed interim leader.

September 9, 2004 - Alberta Alliance kicked off five-city "I Blame Ralph" tour in Edmonton.
Ralph Klein announces Senate Election

September 18, 2004 - Brian Mason formally becomes leader of the Alberta New Democrats.

October 25, 2004 - At the request of Premier Ralph Klein, Lieutenant-Governor Lois Hole dissolves the legislature and sets the election day for November 22.

October 28, 2004 - Premier Klein is harshly criticized by opposition parties and activist groups after he claims that protestors on Alberta's Assured Income for the Severely Handicapped (AISH) who had heckled him did not look severely disabled.

October 31, 2004 - Premier Klein's mother, Florence Gray dies at the age of 80 following a year-long illness. All major parties announce they will suspend their provincial campaigns while the premier mourns.

November 4, 2004 - Global Television Network re-iterates that they will not invite Alberta Alliance leader Randy Thorsteinson to their leaders debate, because his party did not elect any members in the previous election and their sole MLA crossed the floor. The decision sparks anger amongst Alliance members and even disappoints the other three leaders.

November 8, 2004 - Close of nomination's and the Global television leaders debate involving Klein, Taft and Mason.

November 13, 2004 - NDP leader Mason releases a brochure entitled Health Care for Dummies in an effort to mock the premier's reluctance to discuss health care in detail during the campaign.

November 18, 2004 - Advance polling stations open.

November 19, 2004, - Advance polling stations open, and Students across the province vote in Alberta Student Vote, 2004.

November 20, 2004 - Advance polling stations open.

November 22, 2004 - Voting day for the 26th Alberta general election.

- 8:00 p.m. local time: Polls close (03:00, November 23 UTC)
- 8:36 p.m.: CBC projects a PC majority (03:36, November 23 UTC)

December 9, 2004 - The Court of Queen's Bench rules that Chris Kibermanis (Lib.) won the election in Edmonton Castle Downs by three votes, upholding the result of the initial, election-night result. The PC candidate, Thomas Lukaszuk, appealed to the Court of Appeal of Alberta.

January 24, 2005 - The Alberta Court of Appeal rules that Lukaszuk won the election in Edmonton Castle Downs by three votes, overturning the result of the first vote-count, which had given the seat to Kibermanis of the Liberals. Kibermanis accepted defeat and did not appeal to the Supreme Court of Canada.

== Opinion polls ==
Evolution of voting intentions at provincial level
Polling firm	Last day of survey	Source	PCA	ALP	ANDP	AAP	AG	ASC	SPA	Other	Undecided	ME	Sample
Election 2004	November 22, 2004		46.8	29.4	10.2	8.7	2.8	1.2	0.5	0.4			
COMPAS	November 4, 2004		61	19	16	—N/a	3	—N/a	1	1	6	4.5	500
Ipsos-Reid	October 26, 2004		50	26	10	9	—N/a	2	—N/a	4	15	3.5	800
Ipsos-Reid	September 3, 2004		50	22	13	10	4	—N/a	—N/a	—N/a	6	3.5	800
Ipsos-Reid	January 28, 2003		50	24	15	0	—N/a	2	6	3	—N/a	3.5	800
Ipsos-Reid	March 25, 2002		50	31	11	—N/a	—N/a	2	3	2	—N/a	3.5	800
Election 2001	March 12, 2001		61.9	27.3	8.0	—	0.3	0.5 (Note: Combined Social Credit and Alberta Party vote)	0.9 (Note: As Alberta First Party)	1.6			

- Ipsos-Reid, 2004-10-29: PC 50%, Lib 26%, NDP 10%, AAP 9%, Green 4%
- COMPAS Inc. / Calgary Herald, 2004-11-03, 2004-11-04: PC 61%, Lib 19%, NDP 16%, Green 3%, Separation 1%, Other 1%. The pollsters only prompted for the three "major" parties yet Green and Separation showed up over 1% in the results while the Alliance, which is contesting every riding and holds a seat in the legislature, did not.
- Cameron Strategy Inc. / Global News / Calgary Herald, 2004-11-08-11-16: PC 47%, Lib 21%, NDP 11%, AAP 9%, Green 5%
- Ipsos-Reid, 2004-11-12 to 2004-11-17: PC 44%, Lib 29%, NDP 12%, AAP 9%, Green 4% (800 adults, MoE 3.5%)

== Works cited ==
=== Bibliography ===
- Alberta. Chief Electoral Officer (2005). Report of the Chief Electoral Officer on the General Enumeration and General Election of the Twenty-sixth Legislative Assembly (Report). Edmonton: Alberta Legislative Assembly, Office of the Chief Electoral Officer.
- Alberta. Electoral Boundaries Commission (February 2003). "Proposed Electoral Division Areas, Boundaries, and Names for Alberta. Final Report to the Speaker of the Legislative Assembly of Alberta". Edmonton: Legislative Assembly of Alberta.
