= Randy Thorsteinson =

Canadian politician

Leader of the Reform Party of Alberta
- In office May 30, 2016 – July 2026
- Preceded by: Party created
- Succeeded by: Party dissolved

Leader of the Alberta Alliance
- In office 2003–2005
- Preceded by: Party created
- Succeeded by: Eleanor Maroes (Interim)

Leader of the Social Credit Party of Alberta
- In office 1993–1999
- Preceded by: Robert Alford
- Succeeded by: James Albers

Personal details
- Born: Gimli, Manitoba, Canada
- Party: Reform Party of Canada; Social Credit Party of Alberta; Alberta Alliance; Reform Party of Alberta
- Education: Brigham Young University

Randy Thorsteinson (born November 8, 1956) is a politician and businessman in Red Deer, Alberta, Canada.

== Early years ==
Thorsteinson was born in Gimli, Manitoba and spent his youth living in Winnipeg, Manitoba; Edmonton, Alberta; Calgary, Alberta; and Grande Prairie, Alberta.

== Education ==
He attended St. Paul's High School in Winnipeg, Manitoba.

Thorsteinson attended Ricks College (now Brigham Young University-Idaho campus) for two years followed by two years at Brigham Young University (Utah) majoring in business management.

== Business ventures ==
Following university Thorsteinson spent three years as Retail Sales Manager for Travelaire Trailer Canada Ltd. in Red Deer, Alberta.

He was one of the founders of Carlson Tours and Incentive Travel Ltd. in 1984 which subsequently changed its name to Cascadia Motivation Inc. Thorsteinson is the Chief Operating Officer of the company. Cascadia Motivation works with Canadian businesses to improve their performance levels and achieve their objectives.

== Political career ==
Thorsteinson entered politics as president of the Red Deer riding association of the Reform Party of Canada in 1988 and served in this position for three years.

In 1988 Thorsteinson served as the campaign manager for Michael Roth, the Reform Party candidate in Red Deer riding. Roth finished second to Doug Fee (PC) with just under 10,000 votes.

=== Leader of Social Credit ===
Thorsteinson joined the Alberta Social Credit Party in 1991, and became leader the following year.

Under Thorsteinson, Social Credit experienced the beginnings of a rebirth, and in the 1997 general election, the party nominated 70 candidates and collected 64,667 votes (almost seven per cent of the popular vote). This was Social Credit's best result since 1979, but it failed to win any seats in the Legislative Assembly of Alberta.

By 1999, however, Thorsteinson, a convert to the Church of Jesus Christ of Latter-day Saints, was at odds with his party after a movement within the party to limit the involvement of Latter-day Saints. Thorsteinson quit the party in April 1999 and was a founder of the Alberta First Party but was not active in the party.

=== Leader of the Alberta Alliance ===
In 2002 Thorsteinson was the founder of the Alberta Alliance Party (which changed its name to Wildrose Alliance in 2008). The party met the registration requirements and he became the party's leader at the Party Founding Convention in February 2003.

Thorsteinson's new party gained momentum immediately following the 2004 federal election when Edmonton Norwood Member of the Legislative Assembly (MLA) Gary Masyk crossed the floor to join the Alberta Alliance, bringing Alberta Alliance representation into the legislature.

Later that year in the 2004 provincial election, Thorsteinson placed second in votes in his riding of Innisfail-Sylvan Lake, failing to become a Member of the Legislative Assembly (MLA). His party garnered 77,506 votes and won one seat in the election; Paul Hinman was elected MLA for the riding of Cardston-Taber-Warner.

On March 7, 2005, Thorsteinson announced his resignation as leader of the Alberta Alliance, saying he would not be able to devote the time and energy into the party that was required of a leader. Paul Hinman, the lone Alliance MLA in the Legislature succeeded Thorsteinson as leader.

Randy was elected as President of the Alberta Alliance at the 2007 Annual General Meeting held on March 24, 2007 in Edmonton Alberta. He had been serving a short stint as interim president of the party after former president John Murdoch stepped down.

With the merger of the Alberta Alliance Party and the non registered Wildrose Party of Alberta on January 19, 2008, Thorsteinson declined to be a member of the new party and has had no involvement with the renamed Wildrose Alliance Party.

=== Strong and Free Alberta PAC ===
Thorsteinson is the Chairman of the Strong and Free Alberta Political Action Committee which derives its name from the Alberta provincial motto "Fortis et Liber" (strong and free).

The Strong & Free Alberta Political Action Committee is a political organization promoting conservative fiscal and social policies.

=== Leader of the Reform Party of Alberta ===
In 2016, Elections Alberta recognized the registration of a new Reform Party of Alberta, with Thorsteinson as its leader. It is the third provincial political party he has led. The socially conservative party intended to run a full slate in the 30th Alberta general election in 2019, but it nominated only one candidate. He intended to run as a local candidate in the Innisfail-Sylvan Lake by-election held on July 12, 2018, but did not. He was, however, the party's sole candidate in the 31st Alberta general election in 2023.

The party was deregistered in July 2026.

Party political offices
Preceded by Robert Alford	Social Credit Party of Alberta Leader; 1993–1999	Succeeded by James Albers
Preceded by New Party	Alberta Alliance Party Leader; 2003–2005	Succeeded by Eleanor Maroes interim
Preceded by John Murdoch	Alberta Alliance Party President; March 2007 – January 2008	Succeeded by Party merged with the Wildrose Party
