= James Albers =

Canadian politician

James Albers is a former provincial politician from Alberta, Canada.

== Political career ==
Albers ran for the Progressive Conservatives in the 1989 Alberta general election. He ran in the electoral district of Edmonton-Avonmore but was defeated finishing second out of three candidates to New Democrat Marie Laing. He finished about 300 votes ahead of future Liberal MLA Don Massey.

Albers ran for the leadership of Social Credit in 1999. He defeated three other candidates to win a hotly contested leadership race. Just prior to the 2001 Alberta general election he negotiated a coalition with the Alberta Party to jointly run candidates under the Social Credit banner.

Despite the coalition with the Alberta Party, the Social Credit party fielded only 12 candidates in the 2001 election. Support for the party was decimated after a large portion of its members bled off to the Alberta First Party and unprecedented popularity of Premier Ralph Klein. Albers resigned shortly before the election and was replaced by Lavern Ahlstrom as leader.

Albers later joined the Freedom Conservative Party of Alberta, and advocated a Western separatist stance. In 2020, the Freedom Conservative Party of Alberta merged with Wexit Alberta to form the Wildrose Independence Party of Alberta.

Party political offices
| Preceded by Randy Thorsteinson | Leader of the Social Credit Party of Alberta; 1999–2001 | Succeeded by Lavern Ahlstrom |
