= Reform Party of Alberta (2016–2026) =

Provincial political party in Canada

- Defunct provincial party
- Leader: Randy Thorsteinson
- President: Lauren Thorsteinson
- Founded: May 30, 2016
- Dissolved: July 2026
- Headquarters: 69 McCullough Crescent Red Deer, AB, T4R 1S5
- Ideology: Social conservatism
- Political position: Right-wing
- Colours: Blue and sky blue
- Seats in Legislature: 0 / 87

Website
- Official website

The Reform Party of Alberta was a political party in Alberta founded in 2016 by Randy Thorsteinson. The party was not related to the former Reform Party of Alberta, which was de-registered by Elections Alberta in 2004, leaving the name available for a new party.

The party was founded as a social conservative alternative to Wildrose, which Thorsteinson describes as "middle of the road". The party's website lists parental authority, religious freedom, and the privatization of health care among its priorities.

Its first electoral test was the Calgary-Lougheed by-election won by Jason Kenney. Candidate Lauren Thorsteinson (Randy's daughter) finished fourth, ahead of Green Party leader Romy Tittel.

In July 2026, the party was deregistered.
