= John Murray Campbell =

Canadian politician (1931–2021)

Jack Campbell

MLA for Rocky Mountain House
- In office 1979–1989
- Preceded by: Helen Hunley
- Succeeded by: Ty Lund

Personal details
- Born: John Murray Campbell; May 14, 1931 Drumheller, Alberta, Canada
- Died: December 21, 2021 (aged 90) Edmonton, Alberta, Canada
- Party: Progressive Conservative

John Murray "Jack" Campbell (May 14, 1931 – December 21, 2021) was a provincial level politician from Alberta, Canada. He served as a member of the Legislative Assembly of Alberta from 1979 to 1989. He was the younger brother of professional ice hockey player Don Campbell.

== Political career ==
Campbell ran for a seat to the Alberta Legislature in the 1979 Alberta general election. He won the electoral district of Rocky Mountain House with a near landslide victory defeating three other candidates including future Alberta MLA John Younie and Social Credit leader Lavern Ahlstrom. He ran for a second term in the 1982 Alberta general election. Campbell won a landslide victory defeating two other candidates. He ran for his third and final term in the 1986 Alberta general election winning the hotly contested race with the opposition vote divided among four other candidates. Campbell retired from provincial politics at dissolution of the legislature in 1989.

The Alberta government appointed Campbell to sit as an Acting member on the Natural Resources Conservation Board in 2002. Campbell died at the age of 90 on December 21, 2021.
