= Robert Alford (politician) =

Canadian politician

Robert J. Alford (born December 10, 1950, in Edson, Alberta) is a Canadian politician. He married in 1975 and raised two daughters.

== Education ==
Alford graduated from the Southern Alberta Institute of Technology (S.A.I.T.) in 1971 with a diploma in Aircraft Maintenance Technology.

== Politics ==
=== Reform Party of Canada ===
Alford entered politics as the Edmonton Southeast Reform Party Riding Association Policy Vice-President in 1988, and served in this position for one year. He worked as a campaign volunteer in the 1988 and 1997 federal elections, and in the 1989 Alberta Senate nominee election.

=== Alberta Social Credit Party ===
Alford joined the Alberta Social Credit Party in 1988, and shortly became the Provincial Policy Vice-President and the de facto leader. He was confirmed as Alberta Social Credit Party leader in 1990, succeeding Harvey Yuill. In 1992, Alford changed roles within the party, becoming President. He served in that position until 1993.

Alford ran as an Alberta Social Credit candidate in the 1990 Edmonton–Strathcona by-election, and the 1993 and 1997 Alberta general elections. He also ran as a candidate for alderman in the 1992 Edmonton civic election and as a candidate for the Slave Lake town council in 1995.

=== Alberta Alliance Party ===
Alford joined the Alberta Alliance Party in 2002. He ran as an Alberta Alliance Party candidate in the 2004 provincial election. He became the Provincial Policy Vice-President when Paul Hinman was elected as Member of the Legislative Assembly (MLA) and served in this role until 2005.

Party political offices
Preceded by Harvey Yuill	Alberta Social Credit Party leader 1990–1992	Succeeded by Randy Thorsteinson
Preceded by Randy Thorsteinson	Alberta Social Credit Party Party President; 1992–1993	Succeeded by Ken Way
