= Lavern Ahlstrom =

Canadian politician (1936–2024)

Lavern Ahlstrom (May 28, 1936 – April 12, 2024) was a Canadian provincial level politician who was leader of the Alberta Social Credit Party.

== Political career ==
Ahlstrom first became involved with Social Credit in the 1970s. He has been a perennial candidate for the party with some moderately successful showings during his career. Ahlstrom first ran for office in electoral district of Rocky Mountain House in the 1979 Alberta general election finishing second to Progressive Conservative Jack Campbell.

He ran for a second time in the 1986 Alberta general election, this time for the Representative Party of Alberta finishing third. In that election he was once again defeated by Campbell. He would run again in the 1993 Alberta general election once again for Social Credit finishing a strong second to Progressive Conservative Ty Lund.

In the 1997 Alberta general election he would go against Lund for a second time coming up with his best electoral result ever, finishing a close second again. He would attempt another run against Lund in the 2001 Alberta general election this time being defeated finishing second in a landslide. He would run for the last time in the 2004 Alberta general election this time as party leader finishing in a second place tie.

== Leader of Social Credit ==
Ahlstrom was elected leader of Social Credit after James Alberts departed in 2001 after a poor showing in the 2001 Alberta general election. Ahlstrom's leadership of the Alberta Social Credit Party has been notable for the party re-embracing elements of Social Credit economic and monetary theory. Electoral wise he led the party to a better showing running 43 candidates in the 2004 Alberta general election earning 1.2% of the popular vote. The last election contested under his leadership was the Drumheller-Stettler by election held in June 2007. Social Credit finished a very strong third vastly improving their showing in the district over 2004.

Ahlstrom resigned as leader and was replaced by Len Skowronski in November 2007. He died on April 12, 2024, at the age of 87.

Party political offices
Preceded by James Albers	Social Credit Party of Alberta Leader; 2001–2007	Succeeded by Len Skowronski
