= Bruce Hutton =

Canadian politician (born 1946)

Bruce Hutton (born July 2, 1946, in Minnedosa, Manitoba) was leader and founder of the Separation Party of Alberta from 2004 to 2012.

Hutton joined the Royal Canadian Mounted Police in 1967. In 1999, he founded Law-abiding Unregistered Firearms Association (LUFA) to protest the recently introduced federal gun registry. In 2004, he became leader of the Separation Party.

== Quotes of Bruce Hutton ==
"Unresponsive governments force ordinary people to do extraordinary things." – Bruce Hutton, Albertan.

"It has been said the Separation Party of Alberta accomplished in 16 months that which took the Parti Quebecois 16 years to achieve. It has also been said that we have the cart before the horse – forming the political party before the movement gains strength." – Bruce Hutton, Albertan.

"We are looking for that strong leader to come forth. When suitable candidates identify themselves, SPA will have its first Leadership Convention. We are looking for someone who cares about Alberta, not their own personal agenda. We are not interested in any political retread looking to rejuvenate his or her failed political career. We want someone who has vision, can "think outside the box" and has a plan for a strong, vibrant, independent Alberta." – Bruce Hutton, Albertan.

== Personal History ==
Raymond Bruce Hutton was born July 2, 1946 in Minnedosa, Manitoba. His ancestors emigrated to Ontario in the 1700s as United Empire Loyalists from the United States of America and later migrated to Manitoba. His father, Ross Logan Hutton (deceased December 25, 2002) was a WWII Veteran, a journeyman electrician, President – International Brotherhood of Electrical Workers in Manitoba, President – Alberta Electrical Contractors Association, Vice President – Newberry Energy of California, and President – St. Albert Legion, St. Albert, Alberta. His mother, Muriel Margaret (Beddome) Hutton, resided in St. Albert, Alberta. A proud homemaker, her marriage to Ross Logan Hutton produced two sons – Ross William (who died of cancer at the age of 40) and Raymond Bruce Hutton.

Hutton married Virginia Pearl (Javos) Hutton of Nampa, Alberta. After 25 years of marriage, in 2002 she died of cancer at the age of 51. Hutton and his wife had the following children:

- Marisa Lynn Hutton of Edmonton, Alberta
- Ryan Bruce Hutton of Rocky Mountain House, Alberta
- Guylaine Lise Hutton of Red Deer, Alberta.

== Education and Employment History ==
Hutton was an engineer by training. He attained Grade 12 Senior Matriculation at Aden Bowman Collegiate, Saskatoon, Saskatchewan in 1963, followed by University of Saskatchewan, Saskatoon, College of Engineering – first year 1964. He also completed Basic Training with the RCMP in 1967. Hutton jokes that he completed Advanced education by taking Reality courses in the "School of a Great Life."

Hutton held three formal career employment positions:

- Northern Telecoms
- Saskatchewan Government Telephones
- Royal Canadian Mounted Police.

Hutton embraced an entrepreneurial spirit and between the years of 1972 and 2004 owned a number of small businesses in Alberta including:

- Thundercraft Enterprises
- Alta Arctic Adjusters
- The Top Shop, Pockets
- Promo Image
- Rack 'n Roll

After the passing of his wife, Hutton relocated to Rocky Mountain House, Alberta where he functioned as the volunteer leader of SPA.

== Hockey career ==
From 1965 to 1983, Hutton volunteered as a minor hockey coach in Saskatchewan and Alberta. Between 1983 and 1987, Hutton coached and managed hockey professionally in the Alberta Junior Hockey League, including the Hobbema Hawks in 1983 and the Olds Grizzlys in 1987. With the Chinese National Hockey Team, Hutton represented Canada internationally on a coaching exchange, the National Junior Team and Chi Chi Har, a first division team, in the People's Republic of China. Hutton additionally coached a number of Alberta's elite hockey teams including the 1992 Arctic Winter Games Midget team.

== Political career ==
Hutton was raised a small "c" Conservative, and was considered a capital "c" Canadian by many including his father, a WW II Veteran who flew the Union Jack until his passing. His early history did not include political involvement, despite keeping abreast of what was occurring in Alberta and Canada.

This changed in November 1999 with the implementation of Bill-C68 – the Firearms Act. Hutton founded the "Law-abiding Unregistered Firearms Association (LUFA) to organize the firearms community to force the repeal of what he described as "...a catastrophic waste of tax-payers money that would do nothing to reduce crime, violence and suicides."

In January 1999, Hutton warned Canadians that the Firearms Act would cost over 1.5 billion dollars and not make Canada safer. Hutton was criticized by the mainstream media due to influences of then Edmonton based Liberal MP Anne McLellan and then Liberal Justice Minister Alan Rock. Hutton notes that history has resolved this issue since the Canadian government had spent well over 2 billion dollars by 2005.

== Jailing Albertans and the Forming of the Separation Party ==
In October 2002, 13 Alberta farmers were jailed for selling their own product contrary to the regulations imposed at the time through the Canadian Wheat Board. Given that those regulations did not apply to farmers east of Manitoba, they were seen by Western farmers as a double standard and a severe injustice to Alberta. This incident galvanized Hutton into political action.

In February 2003, Hutton met with Jim Chatenay of Pine Lake and Ron Duffy of Lacombe, two of the jailed Alberta farmers. It was decided that a concerted effort must be made to establish a registered separatist party in Alberta. Hence, the Separation Party of Alberta (SPA) was born.

The Separation Party under Hutton formed official party status and ran 12 candidates in the 2004 election and 1 in the 2008 election. Hutton was leader of the party from 2004 to 2012, when Hutton was replaced by Bart Hampton.

== Election history ==
Election	Banner	Leader	Candidates	Votes	%	Seats	+/-	Position	Government
2001	Alberta First	John Reil	16 / 83	8,851	0.87%	0 / 83	0	▲4th	—N/a
2004	Separation	Bruce Hutton	12 / 83	4,680	0.52%	0 / 83	0	▼7th	—N/a
2008	Separation	Bruce Hutton	1 / 83	119	0.01%	0 / 83	0	7th	—N/a
2012	Separation	Bart Hampton	1 / 87	68	0.005%	0 / 87	0	▼9th	—N/a
2015	Alberta First	Bart Hampton	1 / 87	72	0.005%	0 / 87	0	▼10th	—N/a

== Time as Leader ==
Party political offices
Preceded by John Reil	Separation Party of Alberta Leader; 2004–2012	Succeeded by Bart Hampton

== Leadership History ==
Name	Banner	Date	Notes
John Reil	Alberta First	2000–2004	Elected at convention in Edmonton
Bruce Hutton	Separation Party	2004–2012	Changed party name to Separation Party in 2004.
Bart Hampton	Separation Party/Alberta First	2012–2018	Changed party name back to Alberta First in 2013.
Bart Hampton	Alberta First/Western Freedom Party	2012–2018	Changed party name to Western Freedom Party April 2018.
