= Alberta Social Credit Party =

Former right-wing provincial political party in Alberta, Canada

Alberta Social Credit
- Founder: William Aberhart
- Founded: 1935
- Dissolved: May 2017; 9 years ago
- Succeeded by: Pro-Life Alberta Political Association
- Headquarters: Calgary, Alberta
- Ideology: Before 1943: Agrarianism; Social credit; Christian right; Right-wing populism; After 1943: Conservatism; Christian right; Economic liberalism
- Political position: Before 1943: Right-wing; After 1943: Centre-right to right-wing
- National affiliation: Social Credit Party of Canada
- Colours: Green; Blue

Alberta Social Credit was a provincial political party in Alberta, Canada, that was founded on social credit monetary policy put forward by Clifford Hugh Douglas and on conservative Christian social values. The Canadian social credit movement was largely an out-growth of Alberta Social Credit. The Social Credit Party of Canada was strongest in Alberta, before developing a base in Quebec when Réal Caouette agreed to merge his Ralliement créditiste movement into the federal party. The British Columbia Social Credit Party formed the government for many years in neighbouring British Columbia, although this was effectively a coalition of centre-right forces in the province that had no interest in social credit monetary policies.

The Alberta Social Credit party won a majority government in 1935, in the first election it contested, barely months after its formation. During its first years, when led by William Aberhart, it was a radical monetary reform party, at least in theory if not in effect. It encouraged credit unions, printed its own money (Prosperity certificates) and established a government-owned bank (ATB).

After Aberhart's death in 1943 and the rise to leadership of Ernest Manning, followed quickly by the discovery of oil in north-central Alberta and its accompanying wealth for many, Social Credit took on a more conservative hue. Its policies were pro-business and anti-union, and largely opposed to government intervention in the economy. It dropped Alberta's use of proportional representation in 1956. Partly with that help, it stayed in power until 1971, one of the longest unbroken runs in government at the provincial level in Canada. After its defeat, it quickly faded into irrelevance. It lost its remaining seats in 1982, never to return. The party finished a distant seventh in the 2012 and 2015 general elections, before the party's name change.

In May 2017, the party changed its name to Pro-Life Alberta Political Association (or Prolife Alberta, for short) following the election of anti-abortion activist Jeremy Fraser as leader. The change in name reflected the change in direction from the comprehensive political platform of Social Credit with aims of forming government, to the Party's new, and sole, focus of promoting pro-life public policy.

== History ==
=== Origins ===
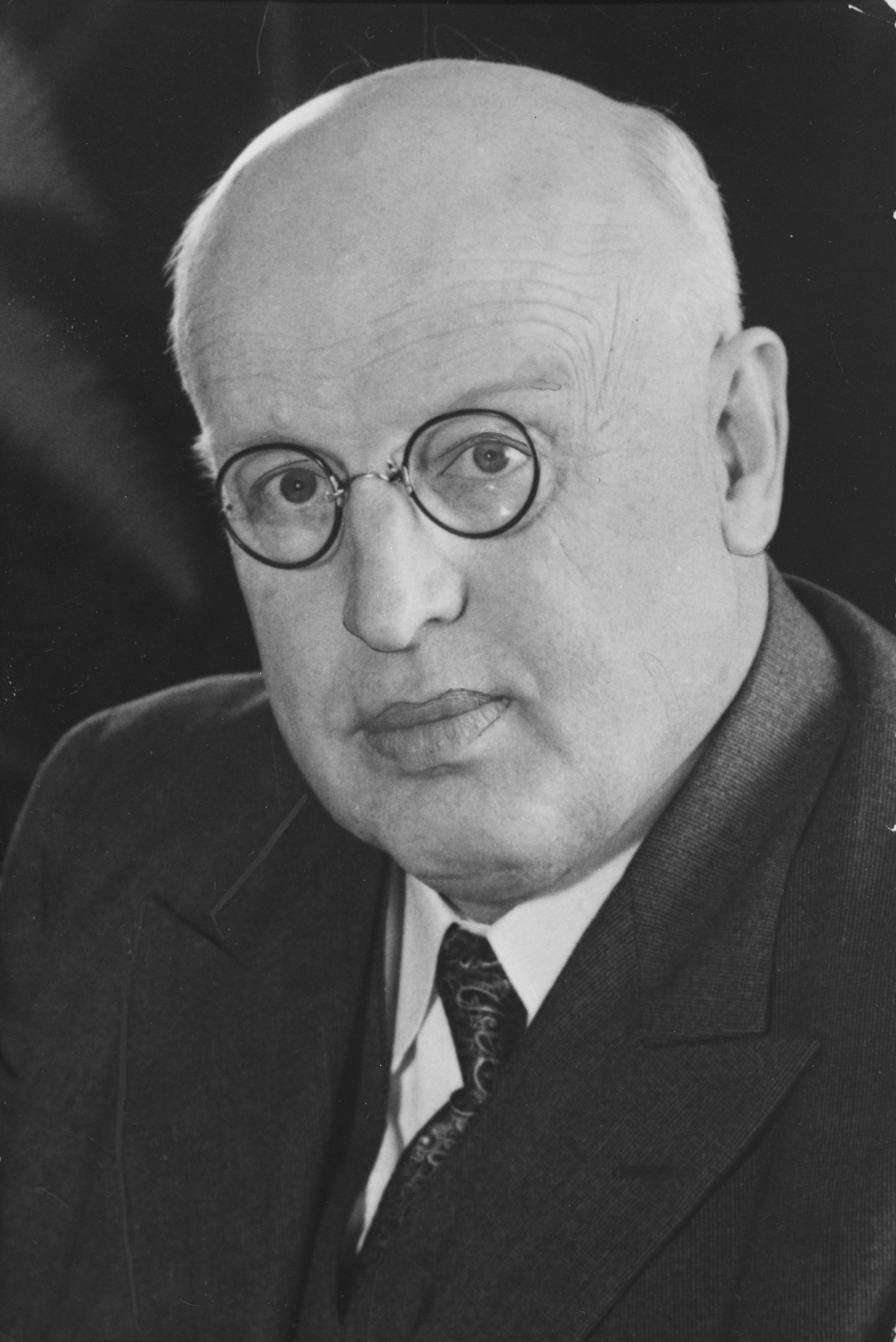
Calgary preacher William Aberhart promoted social credit theory before becoming premier.

William Aberhart, a Baptist lay-preacher and evangelist in Calgary, was attracted to social credit theory while Alberta (and much of the western world) was in the depths of the Great Depression. He soon began promoting it through his radio program on CFCN in Calgary, adding a heavy dose of fundamentalist Christianity to the Social Credit theories of C.H. Douglas. Due to Aberhart's influence, the Canadian social credit movement always had a strong social conservative tinge.

The basic premise of social credit is that all citizens should be paid a dividend as capital and technology replace labour in production; this was especially attractive to farmers sinking under the weight of the Depression. Many study groups devoted to the theory sprang up across the province, which united into the Social Credit League of Alberta. Discussion of banking and monetary reform and social credit was not new to many Albertans. Alberta MP William Irvine (with Manitoba MP J.S. Woodsworth) had successfully pushed for an official inquiry into the subject in the early 1920s to which Edmonton-area self-taught expert George Bevington had presented evidence. Pamphleteers, such as Edmonton's R.C. Owens and Saskatoon's H.C. Pierce, had prepared the waters. James East, a long-serving Edmonton city councillor in the 1912-1936 period, had been proponent of monetary reform as well.

=== Rise to power ===
From 1932 to 1935, Aberhart tried to get the governing United Farmers of Alberta (UFA) to adopt social credit. However, the 1935 UFA convention voted against adopting social credit and UFA Premier Richard Reid rejected the proposals as being outside the province's constitutional powers, so Aberhart entered Social Credit candidates in that year's provincial election. There was widespread discontent with the overly cautious behaviour of the UFA government, and in some cases, local UFA chapters openly supported Social Credit candidates. The UFA government was also reeling from a scandal that had forced Reid's predecessor, John Brownlee, to resign a year earlier. This, in particular, caused some socially conservative UFA members to transfer their allegiance to the Christian-based Social Credit movement. The Social Credit Party campaigned on price controls, and social dividends of $25 a month to Albertan adults.

In the August 1935 Alberta general election, much to its own surprise, Social Credit won a landslide victory, taking 54% of the vote and winning 56 of the 63 seats in the Legislative Assembly. The only elected opposition was five Liberals and two Conservatives. The UFA lost all of its seats in the worst defeat for a sitting provincial government in Canadian history. Alberta thus elected the first Social Credit government in the world. The Social Credit Party's success is largely attributed to the charisma of Aberhart, who brought together a broad coalition ranging from social credit supporters to moderate socialists.

Not even the Socreds had expected to win the election. Indeed, they hadn't even named a leader during the campaign. The Socreds now found themselves having to choose a formal leader who would become the province's new premier. Aberhart was the obvious choice, having been the party's driving force from the beginning. He didn't want the office, but was persuaded to take power. He was elected as leader and premier-designate at the party's first caucus meeting, and was sworn in on 3 September. He became a Member of the Legislative Assembly (MLA) a year later in a by-election.

The first year and a half in power was a period of adjustment for the newly elected Socred MLAs and their premier. Certain historians believe that much of the Social Credit Party's leadership, and many of its members, didn't understand Douglas' teachings. Negotiations between Aberhart and Douglas, who had been hired by the UFA as a financial advisor, were colourful but unproductive. Aberhart, consumed with details of governance and administration, made little progress along the social credit monetary reform road. After election he hired an orthodox financial expert named Magor, much to Douglas's displeasure, thus forestalling radical monetary reform. In March 1937 many Socred MLAs revolted against Aberhart's leadership, refusing to pass the provincial budget until Aberhart promised serious reform of the banking system.

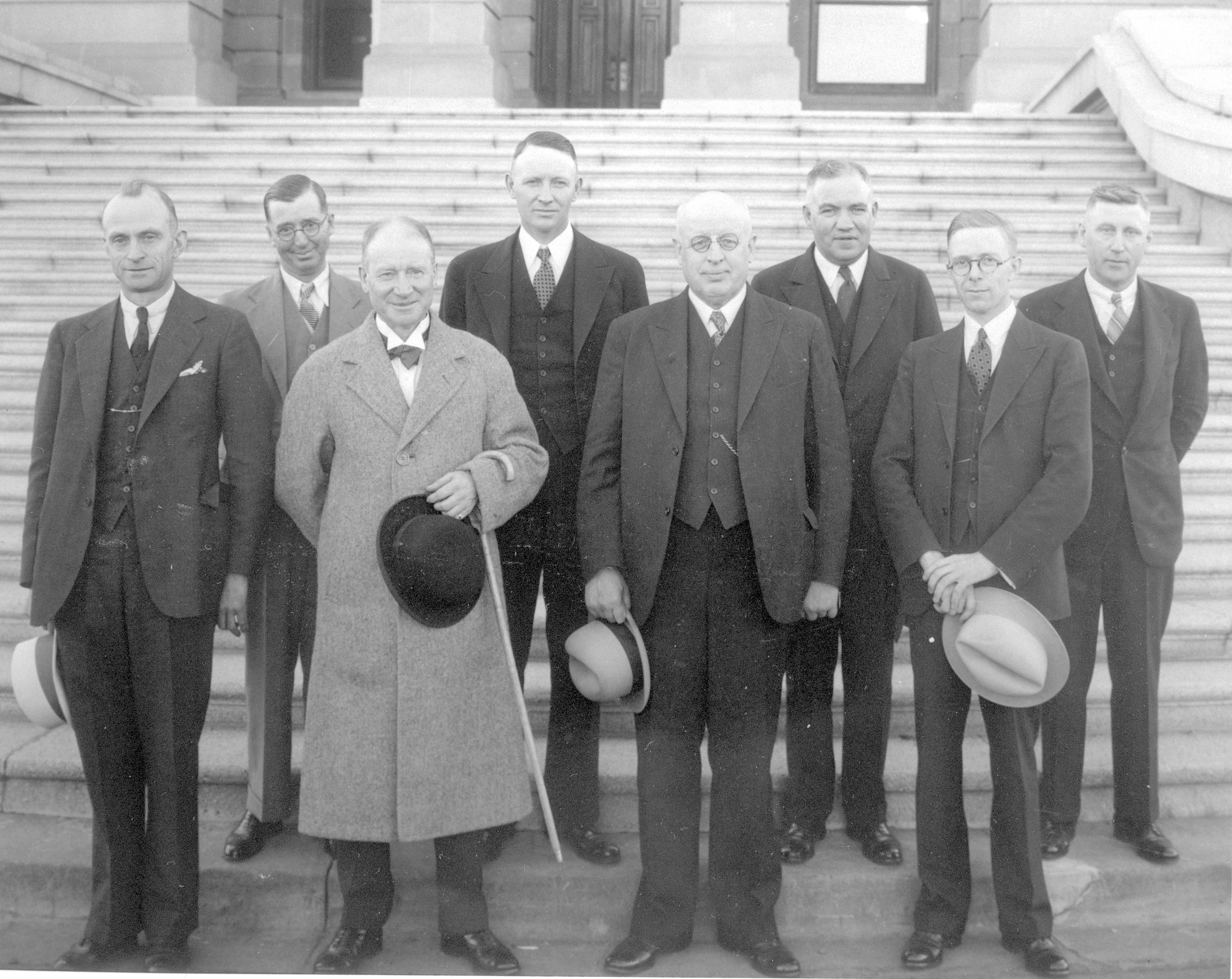
Aberhart and his cabinet in 1935.

==== Not "funny money" ====
Following the 1937 revolt, the government made a serious attempt to implement social credit policies. It passed several pieces of radical populist legislation and issued Alberta's own currency, prosperity certificates, to Alberta residents (dubbed "funny money" by detractors) in accordance with the theories of Silvio Gesell. Douglas, the main leader of the international Social Credit movement, did not like the idea of prosperity certificates, which depreciated in value the longer they were held, and openly criticized Gesell's theories and Aberhart's adoption of them.

The Socred-dominated Alberta Legislature also passed bills that would have placed the province's banks under government control. However, Lieutenant-Governor John C. Bowen refused to grant Royal Assent to the bills. The Supreme Court of Canada sided with Bowen and struck down the bills because only the federal government can legislate on banking. Thwarted in its attempt to impose regulation over private banks operating in Alberta, Aberhart's government gained a foothold in the province's financial sector by creating the Alberta Treasury Branches (ATB) in 1938. The ATB banks, operating as of 2017 as an orthodox financial institution and crown corporation, are a legacy of Social Credit policies in Alberta. It is today the only government-owned financial institution in Canada that provides commercial banking to the public. The acrimony eventually healed, and Bowen served for a total of 13 years as lieutenant-governor, to 1950.

Bowen also refused Royal Assent to the Accurate News and Information Act, which would have forced newspapers to print government rebuttals to stories to which the Executive Council (cabinet) objected. The government's relationship with Bowen became so acrimonious that in 1938, Bowen threatened to use his reserve power to dismiss Aberhart. In the end, Bowen chose not to take this extraordinary action. Had Bowen sacked Aberhart, it would have triggered a new election, and the Socreds were so popular that they would have almost certainly been re-elected.

==== Labour policies ====
Though Aberhart's government initially enjoyed widespread support from Alberta's working class, labour union leaders viewed his government with suspicion, and believed that Aberhart was authoritarian. Some labour leaders took issue with the party's plan to control prices, fearing that this would also lead to strict wage controls. Aberhart's administration legislated the right to organize, although labour leaders viewed these protections as too weak to be meaningful.

In 1937, the administration created the Board of Industrial Relations, which was tasked with enforcing maximum working hours, minimum wages, and certifying workers' bargaining agents. The creation of the board, and its enforcement, won the praise of the Alberta Federation of Labour.

The Alberta Federation of Labour also praised the administration's Workmen's Compensation Board, although many unions affiliated with the Canadian Congress of Labour, including the province's largest union, the 18th District of the United Mine Workers of America, took issue with the Workmen's Compensation Board's leadership.

After discovery of oil in central Alberta in 1947, the Alberta government more and more sided with Big Oil. In 1951, the Oil Workers International Union conducted unionization drive at Edmonton British-American (now Gulf) refinery. Manning's Social Credit government delayed union certification and changed the labour law so the signatures of a majority of workers was not enough. When an unionization vote was held, it lost by ten votes. Neil Reimer was the spearhead of this drive. He later was leader of the New Democratic Party, showing divide between SC government/Big Oil and labour unions/NDP. Reimer helped found an independent Canada union, the Energy and Chemical Workers Union, in Edmonton area in 1981. This union, later part of Communications, Energy and Paperworkers Union of Canada, went on to unionize many Alberta workers despite the efforts of the Alberta government, which had by then been taken over by the Progressive Conservatives.

==== Other policies ====
To uphold its election promise of democratizing Alberta's government, Aberhart passed a law allowing for the recall of members of the Legislative Assembly by petition of constituents. However, he repealed the legislation when he himself became the target of a recall drive.

Continuing the UFA government's conservatism (which verged on prohibition) on the matter of drinking, Aberhart's government enacted several socially conservative laws, notably one restricting the sale and serving of alcohol. It was one of the strictest such laws in Canada. Well into the 1960s, commercial airlines could not serve alcohol while flying over Alberta.

As well, the government passed stronger labour legislation, such as a minimum wage law for male workers (female workers already coming under legislation passed by the UFA government), and centralized the province's school system.

Several socially conservative laws remained in place for years, such as the ban on airlines serving alcohol over provincial airspace.

=== Manning era ===
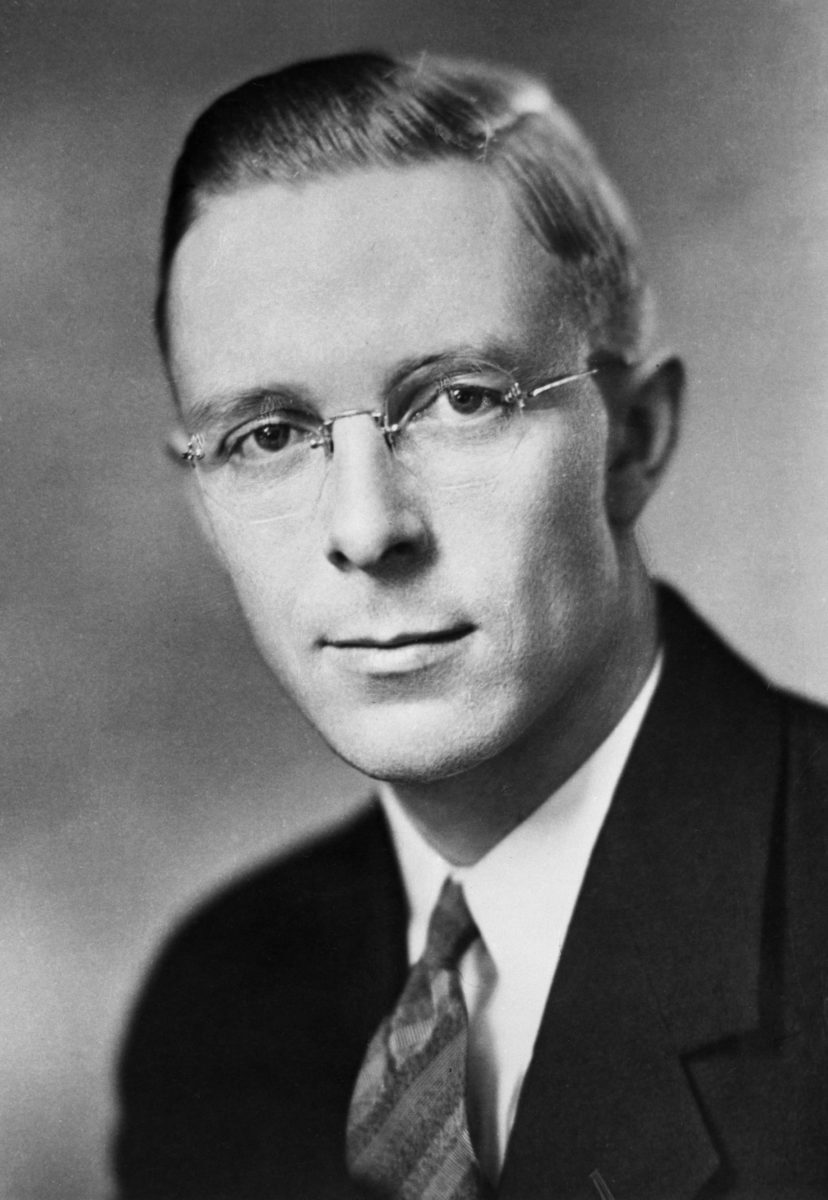
Ernest Manning was premier 1943 to 1968.

The latter years of Aberhart's government saw a decline in popularity, with party membership falling from 41,000 in 1938 to just 3,500 in 1942. The Albertan public recognized that the party's initial campaign promises, such as price controls and social dividends, were failing to materialize. Social Credit was elected with a slightly reduced mandate in 1940. "Bible Bill" Aberhart died in 1943, and was replaced by his Provincial Secretary and Minister of Trade and Industry, Ernest Manning. He served as premier until the late 1960s.

For the 1944 election, Manning campaigned on the labour protections that the party had implemented, using support from the Alberta Federation of Labour to fend off left-wing challenges from the Co-operative Commonwealth Federation and the Labor-Progressive Party. Though other unions, particularly those affiliated with the Canadian Congress of Labour, took issue with the Social Credit Party's workers' protections, divisions within these unions and their leadership prevented any effective endorsement of the Co-operative Commonwealth Federation. During the campaign, Manning engaged in red-baiting on a number of instances, likening the Co-operative Commonwealth Federation to "the socialism of Germany". In the election, Manning led the Alberta Social Credit Party to retain a solid majority in the Legislative Assembly but with barely more than half the overall votes.

As a result of an oil boom in the late 1940s, Alberta received large amounts of oil royalties during much of Manning's term as premier, enabling large amounts of spending on education and healthcare. Under Manning's leadership, the government largely abandoned social credit monetary theories, though it did pass the Oil & Gas Royalties Dividend Act and issue payments to Alberta residents from oil royalties in 1957 and 1958.

Manning also moved to purge antisemites from the party. While antisemitism had been part of the party's Christian populist rhetoric for years, it was far less fashionable after World War II due to awareness of the Holocaust.

Manning led Social Credit to seven consecutive election victories. He governed with very large majorities in the legislature for virtually his entire tenure. His party repeatedly won well over 50 percent of the popular vote and rarely faced more than ten opposition MLAs. This SC domination in the legislature was strengthened when Manning cancelled Alberta's use of proportional representation in the cities of Edmonton and Calgary in 1956 where many of the opposition MLAs were being elected. For most of the next two decades, Alberta was virtually a one-party state.

He wielded considerable influence over the party's federal counterparts as well. For example, he let it be known that his party would not accept francophone Catholic Real Caouette, leader of the party's Quebec wing, as the party's leader—even though Caouette headed the party's third-strongest faction (behind the Alberta and British Columbia Socreds). This led to rumours that Caouette had defeated Robert N. Thompson for the federal party's leadership in 1961, only to have his win vetoed by Manning and the Alberta Socreds.

==== Anti-communism ====
In 1946, Manning's government began a Red Scare, censoring "communist propaganda films" in the hopes of "eliminating communist thought from Alberta-shown movies". Alberta's government quickly began banning films, including films produced by the British government which supported the United Nations, as well as Hollywood films such as The Wild One and Blackboard Jungle. The government's attempts at film censorship continued through the 1960s. Censoring films sympathetic to international cooperation due to allegations of communism, greatly weakening workers' protections, and seeking to create a welcoming environment for oil investors.

Ernest Manning's government was starkly right-wing, attacking a number of unions with charges of communism, censoring films sympathetic to the New Left, and international cooperation due to allegations, and its connection to communism. Manning engaged in red-baiting on a number of instances, likening the CCF to "the socialism of Germany". Saying in one "letter to a CCFer, who... had naively written to suggest CCF-Social Credit electoral co-operation: "it's an insult to suggest to the Canadian people who are sacrificing their sons to remove the curse which the socialism of Germany has brought in the world that their own social and economical security can be attained only by introducing some form of socialism in Canada. the premise embodied in your proposed resolution, namely, that there is such a thing as democratic socialism, contradicts itself in that it attempts to associate two concepts of life which are diametrically opposed and opposite."" And that socialists were trying to "enslave the ordinary people of the world, whose only real salvation lay in the issuance of Social Credit." Censoring films sympathetic to international cooperation due to allegations of communism, greatly weakening workers' protections, and sought to create a welcoming environment for oil investors.

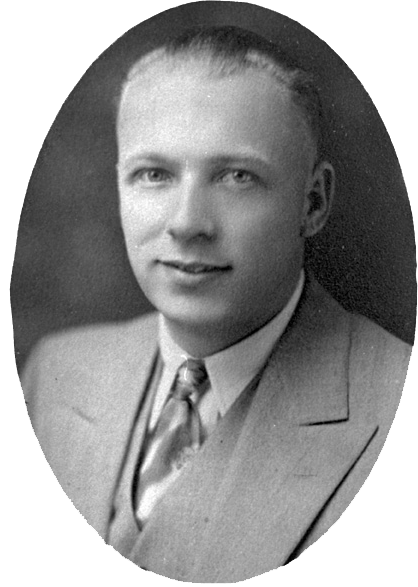
Alfred Hooke, c. 1935

The former social credit board chairman Alfred Hooke who became provincial secretary in 1943 "came even closer than Manning in negating the differences among democratic socialism, communism, and the socialism of national socialism. During the Throne debate in February 1944, Hooke said: "I wonder if this is what our boys are fighting for? They are being told today by many spokesmen in Canada that socialism is the answer to their problems. If this is true, Mr Speaker, why send them to Europe to fight against it? Why don't we tell them that international finance, their worst enemy, is backing the philosophy of socialism.""

Manning also fought against the media and public education systems, saying they were full of Marxists and sympathetic to the communist cause. Stating that it is "evident, in my view, in the news media, which are very heavily slanted, as a general rule favorably slanted, to socialist philosophy. This isn't by chance, it's because communism has been smart enough to see... that there are always a goodly number of men in that field who are sympathetic to the socialistic and even communistic philosophy. You even have the same thing, to varying degrees, in the field of education. It isn't by chance that you find these agitations of Marxism and so forth in many of our universities. It isn't by chance."

===== Red Scare =====
The Manning administration, re-elected with an overwhelming majority of seats in the 1944 election, devoted itself to an anti-socialist crusade. In 1946, Manning's government began a Red Scare, censoring communist propaganda films in the hopes of "eliminating communist thought from Alberta-shown movies".

Manning's administration also sought to disrupt labour strikes, denouncing them as communist, totalitarian, and anti-Christian. Labour unions subsequently defended themselves as non-communist, or simply refused to respond to these charges in the hopes of maintaining good relationships with the government.

In January 1948 a thousands of coalminers both inside and outside Alberta went on strike, threatening the provincial Electrical grid, as most electricity at the time was generated from coal. This one strike alone accounted for 30% of all time lost to strikes in Canada in 1948. In Alberta, the strike accounted for more than 99% of all person-lost days due to strikes for the entire year.

Manning acted swiftly to address the crisis. His government re-wrote the province's labour laws in March to allow the government to shut down the strike. Greatly weakened by charges of communism and Manning's defiance, the unions attempted to persuade legislators, instead of protesting using strikes or violence. Manning's steadfast defiance in the face of union threats halted the rise of militant unionism in Alberta, as it did in other areas like Quebec and the rust belt.

In 1945 Wetaskiwin MP Norman Jaques "spoke for most of the party establishment when he charged... that communists had infiltrated the CBC 'as they have every other organization.'" In 1951, the province's Minister of Municipal Affairs, C.F. Gerhart, claimed hundreds of communist spies were among Alberta workers.

==== Oil production ====
Manning prided his administration's good relations with oil investors, which the Co-operative Commonwealth Federation attempted to use against him in the 1948 election.

Beginning in 1947, Alberta experienced a major oil boom, aiding Manning in fending off political challenges. In campaigning for the 1948 election, the Alberta Social Credit Party purported that the development of the province's petroleum industry was the main issue at stake, and touted the newfound prosperity resulting from this oil to win another strong majority in the Legislative Assembly. During the campaign, the party used such prosperity to fervently denounce the Co-operative Commonwealth Federation's calls for public ownership of the oil industry.

By the mid-1950s, oil royalties provided the Albertan government with the majority of its total revenue, and the province enjoyed significantly higher per capita revenue than its Canadian counterparts. This enabled the government to spend large amounts on education and healthcare, which some historians view as partially responsible for Manning's high levels of popular support.

=== Decline ===
Although it was not apparent at the time, Social Credit created with Manning's last election win in 1967. While the New Democratic Party emerged as a new challenger to the Social Credit Party, they were wary of the strong anti-communist and anti-union sentiments formed in Alberta, and ran a modest campaign alleging corruption within Manning's administration. However, historians suggest that a number of other problems were brewing during Manning's later years, such as the province's poor mental health system, the poor conditions of the native Albertan peoples, high housing and land prices, and relatively low royalty prices on oil. Despite winning 55 of the 65 seats in the legislature, it received less than 45% of the popular vote—its lowest share of the popular vote since 1940. This was a significant drop from 1963, when it took all but six seats.

More importantly, the once-moribund Progressive Conservatives, led by young lawyer Peter Lougheed, won six seats, mostly in Calgary and Edmonton. Despite having long-standing support in Calgary and Edmonton (Manning himself represented an Edmonton riding), Social Credit was at bottom an agrarian-based party, and never really lost this character. The party didn't react nearly fast enough to the changes in Alberta as Calgary and Edmonton gained more influence.

Manning retired in 1968 and was replaced by Agriculture Minister Harry Strom at the party's first leadership election. However, Strom soon was eclipsed by Lougheed, whose modern and urbane image contrasted sharply with that of the dour Strom. His cause was not helped when the Tories picked up an additional four seats during the term.

In the 1971 election, Lougheed's PCs ended Social Credit's 36-year hold on power. The Socred share of the popular vote decreased slightly, but still they finished only five points behind the PCs and won a record number of votes (due in part to Alberta's larger population). While they mostly held their own in their rural heartlands, their support in Edmonton and Calgary plummeted from 1968. The PCs took every seat in Edmonton, and all but five in Calgary. The Socreds lost a number of ridings by a small margin. However, due to the first past the post system, which awards seats to the candidate with the most votes in a district, even if they do not get a majority of votes (and awards power based on seats won), Social Credit's caucus was cut almost in half. It was cut down to 25 seats, and was consigned to the opposition benches for the first time in party history.

Strom led the Socreds into opposition, but resigned as party leader in 1973. Former Health Minister James Douglas Henderson became interim leader, and hence Leader of the Opposition. In the 1973 leadership election, Werner Schmidt, vice-president of Lethbridge Community College, who didn't hold a seat in the Legislative Assembly, ran against former Highways Minister Gordon Taylor, former Education Minister Robert Curtis Clark, and John Ludwig, dean of business education at Alberta College.

Clark, who had the support of half of the party's MLAs, led Schmidt on the first ballot, 583 votes to 512 votes. But in an upset victory, Schmidt won on the second ballot with 814 votes, defeating Clark by 39 votes.

First ballot

- Clark 583
- Schmidt 512
- Taylor 406
- Ludwig 71

(Ludwig eliminated, Taylor withdraws)

Second ballot

- Schmidt 814
- Clark 775

Social Credit sank into near-paralysis in opposition. Having spent all but a few months of its history in government before 1971, it was ill-prepared for a role outside of it and was unable to get the better of the Tories. It didn't help matters that Schmidt was never able to get into the legislature; he lost a by-election shortly after taking the leadership. Henderson remained parliamentary leader until September when Clark succeeded him.

The party's support collapsed in the 1975 election, when it fell to four seats—just barely holding onto official party status—and lost half of the popular vote it had received in 1971. Schmidt failed to win a seat and resigned as party leader, leaving Clark to take the leadership unopposed. Under Clark, the party staved off a total collapse in the 1979 election, holding onto its four seats.

=== Dormancy in the 1980s ===
Clark returned to the backbench a little more than a year after the election. On 29 November 1980, former Calgary mayor Rod Sykes became the party's new leader, defeating Edmonton alderman Julian Kinisky 538–292. Raymond Speaker became parliamentary leader, and hence leader of the opposition. Sykes was unable to get into the legislature, and the party continued to sag in the polls.

The beginning of the end for Social Credit came when Clark retired from politics in 1981. His seat of Olds-Didsbury, a longstanding Social Credit bastion (parts of the riding had been in Social Credit hands for all but one month since 1935), was resoundingly lost to Western Canada Concept, an Alberta separatist party, and its candidate Gordon Kesler. In the process, Social Credit lost official status in the legislature. Unable to resolve the party's internal and financial problems, Sykes quit as leader in March 1982.

On 31 March 1982, Speaker announced that Social Credit would sit out that year's election. In a press release, Speaker said it would be useless for Social Credit to fight the next election since there were not enough Social Credit voters left in the province.

The Social Credit Party council quickly distanced itself from Speaker's statement. There was wide speculation at the time that Speaker would cross the floor to Western Canada Concept. Unable to attract a new leader, the Social Credit membership held an emergency meeting 18 September 1982. A resolution was put forward that would have dissolved the party. This was soundly rejected by the attending delegates and a new president was elected.

As soon as the writs were dropped in October, Speaker and Walt Buck left the party to become independent candidates for the legislature. The party's third MLA, Fred Mandeville, announced his retirement. George Richardson was named acting leader.

Social Credit went into the 1982 election in a precarious position, with no full-time leader and, for the first time since 1935, no incumbents. It had been unable to get its leader elected to the legislature at any point during the parliamentary term. The party ran only 23 candidates, easily its smallest slate at the time, and garnered only 0.8 percent of the vote. It was shut out of the Legislative Assembly altogether for the first time, and has never elected another MLA.

In 1986, Social Credit, Western Canada Concept and the Heritage Party of Alberta joined to form the Alberta Alliance Political Association. The Alliance fell apart when the WCC left, followed by Social Credit. The AAPA became the present-day Alberta Party. Social Credit sat out the 1986 election. Most of its remaining supporters joined and ran for the Representative Party, which had been formed by Speaker after he and Buck were denied funding normally reserved to opposition parties. Speaker's new party billed itself as a more modern version of Social Credit without the monetary policies.

=== Rebirth in the 1990s and decline ===
Interim leadership of the party was given to Martin Hattersley, an Edmonton lawyer, and later to Harvey Yuill of Barrhead. What remained of the party ran six candidates in the 1989 election. The party was rekindled under the leadership of Robert Alford from 1990 to 1992. In 1991, Randy Thorsteinson, a Reform Party of Canada activist, was elected as party president. In 1992, Thorsteinson was elected as leader, and Robert Alford as president. Social Credit improved its performance in the 1993 election, but won no seats. In the 1997 election, the party nominated 70 candidates, and won 64,667 votes, over 7% of the popular vote.

After the 1997 election, polling revealed that the Social Credit Party was poised for a break-through: an estimated 150,000 Albertans would have been ready to once again support Social Credit as an alternative. This could have meant eight seats in the Legislature. However, in April 1999, Thorsteinson, a devout member of the Church of Jesus Christ of Latter-day Saints, resigned to protest an internal party proposal to limit Mormon involvement within the party. Social Credit's fortunes quickly faded.

In November 1999, James Albers was elected over Jon Dykstra and Norm Racine to lead the party in a hotly contested race. Wiebo Ludwig was disqualified.

For the 2001 election, the party formed an electoral coalition with the Alberta Party. The party nominated 12 candidates in that election (down from 70 in 1997) and received 5,361 votes (0.5% of the popular vote), down from 64,667. The right wing vote fractured between the newly formed Alberta First Party and Social Credit. Most right-wing voters went back to supporting the Progressive Conservatives, who had experienced a resurgence in popularity.

Lavern Ahlstrom was appointed Social Credit leader in 2001. Under Ahlstrom's leadership, the party made moves toward re-embracing elements of social credit monetary theory.

The party nominated 42 candidates for the 2004 election, and won 10,874 votes (1.2% of the popular vote, an increase of 0.7% from 2001.) It polled well in a few ridings, most notably Rocky Mountain House where Lavern Ahlstrom tied for second place.

In late 2005, the party entered discussion about merging with the Alberta Party and the Alberta Alliance. Despite cooperation and successful merger talks between the party leaders, the Social Credit Party membership voted down the motion to merge at the 2006 Social Credit Convention.

In the Drumheller-Stettler by-election on 12 June 2007, the party's candidate Larry Davidson placed third with 11.7% of the vote.

=== Alberta Social Credit in the 21st century ===
In early November 2007, Len Skowronski replaced Lavern Ahlstrom as leader of the party.

The party fielded eight candidates for the 2008 general election on 3 March. The party received 0.22% of the total or 2,051 votes, a decline of 1.0% from the previous election. The best individual riding result, and the only result over 3.0 percent, was for Wilf Tricker in Rocky Mountain House, who received 6.4% of the vote, finishing fifth in a field of seven candidates, just 0.62% behind the Green candidate and well ahead of the NDP and Separation Party of Alberta candidates.

It fielded three candidates in the 2012 election, and garnered 0.023% of the total vote. Its six nominated candidates won 832 votes in the 2015 election, 0.056% of the total vote—an increase of 0.033% over its 2012 result.

=== Pro-Life Alberta Political Association ===
Pro-Life Alberta Political Association
- Leader: Murray Ruhl
- President: Murray Ruhl
- Founded: May 3, 2017
- Preceded by: Alberta Social Credit Party
- Ideology: Opposition to abortion
- Colours: Blue and red

Website
- www.prolifealberta.com

At Social Credit's annual general meeting in January 2016, a group of anti-abortion activists took over the party. One of them, Jeremy Fraser, was elected as leader. They also replaced the board.

The party's registered name with Elections Alberta was changed to the Pro-Life Alberta Political Association (or Prolife Alberta, for short) on May 3, 2017.

The change in name reflected the change in the party's direction. Whereas Alberta Social Credit had aims of forming government, Prolife Alberta is a single-issue political association solely focused on promoting right-to-life issues, and anti-abortion efforts in Alberta. As a party, it has much greater latitude than other single-issue groups to engage in political activism and raise money.

In March 2018, Fraser resigned as leader.

On August 17, 2018, Murray Ruhl became the new party leader.

Ruhl has virtually no public presence; the party claims it is led by a team. It openly admitted it had no desire to win government, but existed solely to promote its policies, making it a Canadian version of a testimonial party. As in 2019, it only ran a single candidate in the 2023 provincial election.

Prolife Alberta advertises itself as "...a group of women and men committed to promoting pro-life public policy in Alberta, through politics."

== Election results ==
=== Legislative Assembly ===
Election	Leader	Votes	%	Seats	+/–	Position	Status
1935	William Aberhart	163,700	54.25	56 / 63	▲56	▲1st	Majority
1940	William Aberhart	132,507	42.90	36 / 57	▼20	1st	Majority
1944	Ernest Manning	146,367	51.88	51 / 57	▲15	1st	Majority
1948	Ernest Manning	164,003	55.63	51 / 57	Steady	1st	Majority
1952	Ernest Manning	167,789	56.24	52 / 61	▲1	1st	Majority
1955	Ernest Manning	175,553	46.42	37 / 61	▼15	1st	Majority
1959	Ernest Manning	230,283	55.69	61 / 65	▲24	1st	Majority
1963	Ernest Manning	221,107	54.81	60 / 63	▼1	1st	Majority
1967	Ernest Manning	222,270	44.60	55 / 65	▼5	1st	Majority
1971	Harry Strom	262,953	41.10	25 / 75	▼30	▼2nd	Opposition
1975	Werner Schmidt	107,211	18.17	4 / 75	▼21	2nd	Opposition
1979	Robert Curtis Clark	141,284	19.87	4 / 79	Steady	2nd	Opposition
1982	George Richardson	7,843	0.83	0 / 79	▼4	▼6th	No seats
1986	Did not contest (see Representative Party)						
1989	Harvey Yuill	3,939	0.47	0 / 83	Steady	▲4th	No seats
1993	Randy Thorsteinson	23,885	2.41	0 / 83	Steady	4th	No seats
1997	Randy Thorsteinson	64,667	6.84	0 / 83	Steady	4th	No seats
2001 (Note: During the 2001 election, the party formed a coalition with the Alberta Party.)	James Albers	5,361	0.53	0 / 83	Steady	▼6th	No seats
2004	Lavern Ahlstrom	10,874	1.22	0 / 83	Steady	6th	No seats
2008	Len Skowronski	2,051	0.22	0 / 83	Steady	6th	No seats
2012	Len Skowronski	294	0.02	0 / 83	Steady	▼7th	No seats
2015	Len Skowronski	832	0.06	0 / 83	Steady	▼8th	No seats
As Pro-Life Alberta Political Association
2019	Murray Ruhl	60	0.00	0 / 83	Steady	▼12th	No seats
2023	Murray Ruhl	90	0.01	0 / 83	Steady	▼15th	No seats

== Party leaders ==
=== Alberta Social Credit Party ===
- William Aberhart 1935–1943 (7th Premier of Alberta)
- Ernest Manning 1943–1968 (8th Premier of Alberta)
- Harry E. Strom 1968–1972 (9th Premier of Alberta)
- James Henderson (acting) 1972–1973
- Werner Schmidt 1973–1975
  - James Henderson 1973 (leader in the legislature)
  - Robert Curtis Clark 1973–1975 (leader in the legislature)
- Robert Curtis Clark 1975–1980
- Rod Sykes 1980–1982
  - Raymond Speaker 1980–1982 (leader in the legislature)
- Ray Neilson 1984–1985
- George Richardson (acting leader) 1982–1985
- Martin Hattersley (interim Leader) 1985–1988
- Harvey Yuill (interim Leader) 1988–1990
- Robert Alford 1990–1993
- Randy Thorsteinson 1993–1999
- James Albers 1999–2001
- Lavern Ahlstrom 2001–2007
- Len Skowronski 2007–2016
- Jeremy Fraser 2016–2017

=== Pro-Life Alberta Political Association ===
Leader	Term of office	Notes
Jeremy Fraser	May 3, 2017 – March 2018	Previously served as the final Alberta Social Credit Party leader from January 2016 – May 3, 2017
Murray Ruhl	August 17, 2018 – present	

== See also ==
- List of Alberta general elections
- List of Alberta political parties

Preceded by United Farmers of Alberta	Governing party of Alberta; 1935–1971	Succeeded by Progressive Conservative Association of Alberta
