= List of Alberta CCF/NDP members =

This is a list of members of the Alberta, Canada, branch of the Co-operative Commonwealth Federation (CCF), a social democratic political party, and its successor, the Alberta New Democratic Party (NDP) who have been elected at either the provincial or federal level. CCF-ers and NDP-ers who were active in municipal affairs are also listed.

== Provincial politics ==
=== 1932 by-election ===
Chester Ronning, elected as an UFA MLA, one of founding organizations of the CCF, was an adherent of the CCF. (Camrose college instructor and CCF leader Chester Ronning had been elected in October 25, 1932 provincial by-election as joint UFA/CCF candidate but was defeated in 1935 and was unable to regain his seat in the 1940 election. He resigned as CCF leader in 1942 and went on to be Canada's ambassador to China, where he had been born.

Angus James Morrison was elected as a Labour MLA in 1940 by defeating the incumbent Social Credit MLA as well as a CCF candidate. The CCF and the Alberta Labour clubs merged in 1942 but Morrison did not run for re-election in 1944.)

=== 1942 by-election ===
A CCFer was elected to the Legislative Assembly of Alberta for the first time in a 1942 by-election, excepting the problematic cases of Ronning and Morrison.

- Elmer Roper - printer, labour activist, Mayor of Edmonton 1959–1963 - Edmonton #1 1942by-1944-1948-1952-1955 (ran, CCF lost)

=== 1944 general election ===
A second CCF was elected in 1944 general election. By joining Elmer Roper, he increased the party's caucus in the Legislature to two members.

- Aylmer Liesemer - teacher - Calgary #5 1944-1948-1952

=== 1948 general election ===
Both incumbent CCFers were re-elected in the 1948 election, but the party won no additional seats.

=== 1952 general election ===
A new CCF MLA was elected in the 1952 election, and Roper was re-elected.

- Nick Dushenski - Willingdon - 1952-1955-1959 (1959 did not run, a different CCF candidate was unsuccessful)

=== 1955 general election ===
A new CCF MLA was elected in the 1955 election, while Roper lost his seat.

- Stanley Ruzycki - Vegreville - 1955-1959

=== 1959 and 1963 general elections ===
No CCFers or New Democrats were elected in the 1959 or 1963 general elections including leader Neil Reimer.

=== 1966 by-election ===
One New Democrat was elected in a 1966 by-election.

- Garth Turcott - Pincher Creek-Crowsnest 1966by-1967 (ran, NDP lost)

=== 1967 general election ===
No New Democrats were elected in the 1967 election.

=== 1971 general election ===
One New Democrat was elected in the 1971 election.

- Grant Notley - Edmonton teacher - Spirit River-Fairview (Dunvegan-Central Peace) 1971-1975-1979-1982-1984 (died in plane crash)

=== 1975-1979 general elections ===
The single New Democrat, Notley, was re-elected alone in these elections.

=== 1982 general election ===
One additional New Democrat was elected in the 1982 election, increasing the party's caucus to two members.

- Ray Martin - Edmonton Norwood - 1982-1986-1993, Edmonton-Beverly-Cleaview 2004-2008

=== 1985 by-election ===
The NDP retained one seat in a 1985 by-election, caused by the death of Grant Notley.

- Jim Gurnett - Spirit River-Fairview - 1985by-1986 (1986 ran but was not re-elected)

=== 1986 general election ===
Martin re-elected. Fifteen additional New Democrats were elected in the 1986 election, increasing the party's caucus to 16 members.

- Leo Piquette - Athabasca-Lac La Biche - 1986–1989 (1989 ran but was not re-elected)
- Barry Pashak - Calgary Forest Lawn - 1986-1989-1993 (1993 ran, but not re-elected)
- Bob Hawkesworth - Calgary Mountain View - 1986-1989-1993 (1993 ran, but not re-elected)
- Marie Laing - Edmonton Avonmore - 1986-1989-1993 (1993 ran, but not re-elected)
- Tom Sigurdson - Edmonton Belmont - 1986-1989-1993 (1993 ran, but not re-elected)
- Ed Ewasiuk - Edmonton Beverly - 1986-1989-1993 (1993 ran, but not re-elected) (formerly Edmonton Alderman 1980–1986)
- Christie Mjolsness - Edmonton Calder - 1986-1989-1993 (1993 ran, but not re-elected)
- William Roberts - Edmonton Centre - 1986-1989-1993 (1993 ran, but not re-elected)
- John Younie - Edmonton Glengarry - 1986–1989 (ran, but not re-elected)
- Pam Barrett - Edmonton Highlands - 1986-1989-1993, 1997-2000by (2000 retired, a different NDP candidate won)
- Alex McEachern - Edmonton Kingsway - 1986-1989-1993 (1993 ran, but not re-elected)
- Gerry Gibeault - Edmonton Mill Woods - 1986-1989-1993 (1993 ran, but not re-elected)
- Gordon Wright - Edmonton Strathcona - 1986-1989-1990by (died in office, NDP-er Barrie Chivers won the subsequent by-election)
- Bryan Strong - St. Albert - 1986–1989 (1989 did not run)
- Derek Fox - Vegreville - 1986-1989-1993 (1993 ran, but not re-elected)

=== 1989 general election ===
The party lost three MLAs (Piquette, Younie, Strong) but gained three other seats in the 1989 election.

- John McInnis - Edmonton Jasper Place - 1989–1993 (1993 ran, but not re-elected)
- Stan Woloshyn - Stony Plain - 1989–1993 (he later joined the P-C caucus)
- Jerry Doyle - West Yellowhead - 1989–1993 (1993 ran, but not re-elected)

=== 1990 by-election ===
A New Democrat was elected in a 1990 by-election, occasioned by the death of sitting MLA Gordon Wright.

- Barrie Chivers - Edmonton Strathcona 1990–1993 (1993 ran, but not re-elected)

=== 1993 general election ===
All incumbent New Democrats were defeated and no new NDP MLAs were elected in the 1993 election.

=== 1997 general election ===
Two New Democrats were elected in the 83 seats available in the 1997 election, one of whom (Pam Barrett) had previously served in the Legislature.

- Raj Pannu - Edmonton Strathcona 1997–2008 (retired, but a different NDP candidate, Rachel Notley (daughter of former NDP MLA Grant Notley), won)

=== 2000 by-election ===
The NDP retained one seat in a 2000 by-election, occasioned by the resignation of Pam Barrett.

- Brian Mason - Edmonton Highlands 2000–2004, Edmonton Highlands-Norwood 2004–2019 (formerly Edmonton Councillor Oct. 1989–2000)

=== 2001 general election ===
The party won two of the 83 seats available in the 2001 election - Pannu and Mason being re-elected.

=== 2004 general election ===
The party won two additional seats in the 2004 election, for a total of four (including sitting MLAs Raj Pannu and Brian Mason). One of the new members, Ray Martin (Edmonton Beverly Clareview), had previously served in the Legislature.

- David Eggen - Edmonton-Calder 2004–2008 (2008 ran, not re-elected); 2012–2019, Edmonton-North West 2019–present

=== 2008 general election ===
The NDP lost 2 of its MLAs (Ray Martin and Dave Eggen) but re-elected Mason and Rachel Notley was elected to hold the Edmonton Strathcona constituency for the party, replacing Raj Pannu.

- Rachel Notley - Edmonton-Strathcona 2008–2024

=== 2012 general election ===
Four NDP MLAs were elected in the 2012 Alberta election, a gain of 2. Dave Eggen, Brian Mason and Rachel Notley were re-elected and a new NDP MLA was elected:

- Deron Bilous - Edmonton-Beverly-Clareview 2012–2023

=== 2015 general election ===
In a surprise result, the NDP re-elected its four sitting MLAs and won 50 additional seats. It formed a majority government with leader Rachel Notley elected premier-designate. Notley, former leader Brian Mason, David Eggen and Deron Bilous were re-elected.

- Shaye Anderson - Leduc-Beaumont, 2015-2019
- Erin Babcock - Stony Plain, 2015-2019
- Oneil Carlier - Whitecourt-Ste. Anne, 2015-2019
- Jon Carson - Edmonton-Meadowlark 2015–2019, Edmonton-West Henday 2019–2023 (previously held riding of Edmonton-Meadowlark eliminated in re-distribution)
- Joe Ceci - Calgary-Fort, 2015-2019 Calgary-Buffalo, 2019–present (previously held riding of Calgary-Fort eliminated in re-distribution)
- Michael Connolly - Calgary-Hawkwood, 2015-2019
- Craig Coolahan - Calgary-Klein, 2015-2019
- Estefan Cortes-Vargas - Strathcona-Sherwood Park, 2015-2019
- Lorne Dach - Edmonton-McClung, 2015–present
- Thomas Dang - Edmonton-South West 2015–2019, Edmonton-South 2019–2023 (previously held riding of Edmonton-South West eliminated in re-distribution; resigned from the NDP caucus in 2021)
- Deborah Drever - Calgary-Bow, 2015–2019 (Expelled from the NDP caucus in 2015 for inappropriate social media posts, but was re-admitted in 2016)
- Richard Feehan - Edmonton-Rutherford, 2015–2023
- Maria Fitzpatrick - Lethbridge-East, 2015-2019
- Kathleen Ganley - Calgary-Buffalo 2015–2019, Calgary-Mountain View 2019–present (switched from previous held riding to allow Joe Ceci to contest Calgary-Buffalo)
- Nicole Goehring - Edmonton-Castle Downs, 2015–present
- Christina Gray - Edmonton-Mill Woods, 2015–present
- Bruce Hinkley - Wetaskiwin-Camrose, 2015-2019
- Sarah Hoffman - Edmonton-Glenora, 2015–present
- Vivienne Horne (Canadian politician) - Spruce Grove-St. Albert, 2015–2019
- Debbie Jabbour - Peace River, 2015-2019
- Anam Kazim - Calgary-Glenmore, 2015-2019
- Jamie Kleinsteuber - Calgary-Northern Hills, 2015–2019
- Danielle Larivee - Lesser Slave Lake, 2015-2019
- Jessica Littlewood - Fort Saskatchewan-Vegreville, 2015-2019
- Rod Loyola - Edmonton-Ellerslie, 2015–2025
- Robyn Luff - Calgary-East, 2015–2018 (sat as an independent until the 2019 election)
- Brian Malkinson - Calgary-Currie, 2015-2019
- Marg McCuaig-Boyd - Dunvegan-Central Peace-Notley, 2015–2019
- Annie McKitrick - Sherwood Park, 2015-2019
- Stephanie McLean - Calgary-Varsity, 2015-2019
- Karen McPherson - Calgary-MacKay-Nose Hill, 2015–2017 (left the NDP caucus and later joined the Alberta Party)
- Barb Miller - Red Deer-South, 2015-2019
- Ricardo Miranda - Calgary-Cross, 2015-2019
- Chris Nielsen - Edmonton-Decore, 2015–2023
- Brandy Payne - Calgary-Acadia, 2015-2019
- Shannon Phillips - Lethbridge-West, 2015–2024
- Colin Piquette - Athabasca-Sturgeon-Redwater, 2015-2019
- Marie Renaud - St. Albert, 2015–present
- Eric Rosendahl - West Yellowhead, 2015-2019
- Irfan Sabir - Calgary-McCall, 2015–present
- Marlin Schmidt - Edmonton-Gold Bar, 2015–present
- Kim Schreiner - Red Deer North, 2015-2019
- David Shepherd - Edmonton-Centre 2015–2019, Edmonton-City Centre 2019–present (previously held riding of Edmonton-Centre eliminated in re-distribution)
- Lori Sigurdson - Edmonton-Riverview, 2015–present
- Graham Sucha - Calgary-Shaw, 2015-2019
- Heather Sweet - Edmonton-Manning, 2015–present
- Bob Turner - Edmonton-Whitemud, 2015-2019
- Bob Wanner - Medicine Hat, 2015-2019
- Cam Westhead - Banff-Cochrane, 2015–2019
- Denise Woollard - Edmonton-Mill Creek, 2015-2019

=== 2019 general election ===
The NDP majority government led by Premier Rachel Notley was defeated after a single term. The party lost 30 seats but re-elected 21 MLAs and elected three new members in previously held seats.

- Janis Irwin - Edmonton-Highlands-Norwood, 2019–present
- Jasvir Deol - Edmonton-Meadows, 2019–present
- Rakhi Pancholi - Edmonton-Whitemud, 2019–present

=== 2023 general election ===
The NDP was returned as the largest official opposition in Alberta history, with an increased vote share, and 38 seats. It re-elected 19, elected an additional 14 seats, and elected 5 new members in previously held seats. The new members included:

- Peggy Wright - Edmonton-Beverly-Claireview 2023-present
- Sharif Haji - Edmonton-Decore 2023-present
- Brooks Arcand-Paul - Edmonton-West Henday 2023-present
- Jodi Calahoo Stonehouse - Edmonton-Rutherford 2023-present
- Rhiannon Hoyle - Edmonton-South 2023-present
- Nathan Ip - Edmonton-South West 2023-present
- Kyle Kasawski - Sherwood Park 2023-present
- Janet Eremenko - Calgary-Currie 2023-present
- Samir Kayande - Calgary-Elbow 2023-present
- Lizette Tejada - Calgary-Klein 2023-present
- Luanne Metz - Calgary-Varsity 2023-present
- Parmeet Singh Boparai - Calgary-Falconridge 2023-present
- Gurinder Brar - Calgary-North East 2023-present
- Amanda Chapman - Calgary-Beddington 2023-present
- Julia Hayter - Calgary-Edgemont 2023-present
- Court Ellingson - Calgary-Foothills 2023-present
- Diana Batten - Calgary-Acadia 2023-present
- Nagwan Al-Guneid - Calgary-Glenmore 2023-present
- Sarah Elmeligi - Banff-Kannanaskis 2023-present

=== 2026 by-election ===
One New Democrat was elected in a 2026 by-election.

- Kyle Campbell - Calgary-Shaw 2026by-present

== Federal politics ==
=== 1988 federal election ===
Former political staffer Ross Harvey was the first NDP or CCF member elected to the House of Commons representing a constituency in Alberta.

- Ross Harvey - Edmonton East, 1988–1993 (defeated at the 1993 election)

=== 2008 federal election ===
Environmental lawyer Linda Duncan was the second elected NDP MP for a constituency in Alberta.

- Linda Duncan - Edmonton-Strathcona 2008–2019 (retired from politics at the 2019 election)

=== 2011 federal election ===
Incumbent MP Linda Duncan was re-elected.

=== 2015 federal election ===
Linda Duncan re-elected for the third and final time. She would announce her intention to retire from politics in 2018 and not stand for re-election the following year.

=== 2019 federal election ===
Local not-for-profit executive Heather McPherson was elected in Edmonton-Strathcona, succeeding Linda Duncan as the NDP representative for the riding. She was the only non-conservative elected in Alberta and Saskatchewan at the 2019 election.

- Heather McPherson - Edmonton-Strathcona 2019–present

=== 2021 federal election ===
The NDP won a second seat in Alberta for the first time ever by electing members from both Edmonton Strathcona and Edmonton Griesbach.

- Blake Desjarlais - Edmonton Griesbach 2021–2025

== Prominent NDPers/CCFers at the municipal level ==
- Lionel Gibbs - Labour Party MLA (1926 to his death in 1934), active in the CCF after its founding in 1932 and Edmonton city councillor (1924 to his death in 1934)
- Rice Sheppard - frequent candidate at provincial level, co-founder and executive member of The United Farmers of Alberta, long-time Edmonton city councillor, attended the CCF Founding in 1932, switched to Social Credit party in middle 1930s. He was a member of the 1933-34 Edmonton city councils when members of the Canadian Labour Party, not yet amalgamated in the CCF, held majority power.
- Harry Ainlay - Edmonton mayor 1945–1949, Alberta CCF president in the 1940s, CCF provincial candidate 1936. He was a member of the 1932-1933 and 1933-34 Edmonton city councils when members of the Canadian Labour Party, not yet amalgamated in the CCF, held majority power.
- Margaret Crang She was a member of the 1933-34 Edmonton city council when members of the Canadian Labour Party, not yet amalgamated in the CCF, held majority power. Re-elected in 1935. Later member of CCF, then barred from party due to oppositional candidacy.
- Elmer Roper - Edmonton mayor 1960-1963, CCF MLA 1942-1955
- Ivor Dent - Edmonton mayor 1968–1974, city councillor 1963–1968, Alberta NDP president
- Tooker Gomberg - Edmonton city councillor 1992–1995, environmental activist
- William D. McLean - Edmonton city councillor 1971-1974
- Jan Reimer - Edmonton mayor 1989–1995, city councillor 1980-1989
- G. Lyall Roper - Edmonton city councillor 1983-1986
- Bob Hawkesworth - Calgary alderman, Ward 4 then NDP MLA
- Ed Ewasiuk - Edmonton city councillor then NDP MLA
- Brian Mason - Edmonton city councillor then NDP MLA (2000–2019), party leader (2004–2014), and Minister of Transportation (2015–2019)
- Joe Ceci - Calgary alderman then NDP MLA and Minister of Finance (2015–2019)

== See also ==
- List of CCF/NDP members
- List of British Columbia CCF/NDP members
- List of Saskatchewan CCF/NDP members
- List of Manitoba CCF/NDP members
- List of Ontario CCF/NDP members
- List of Nova Scotia CCF/NDP members
- List of Yukon NDP members
