= Edmonton-Manning (provincial electoral district) =

Provincial electoral district in Alberta, Canada

Alberta electoral district
- Edmonton-Manning within the City of Edmonton, 2017 boundaries

Provincial electoral district
- Legislature: Legislative Assembly of Alberta
MLA
Heather Sweet
New Democratic
- District created: 1993
- First contested: 1993
- Last contested: 2023

Edmonton-Manning is a provincial electoral district in Edmonton, Alberta, Canada. It is situated in the northeast quadrant of the city. It was created in 1993 and is mandated to return a single member to the Legislative Assembly. The riding is named after former Social Credit Premier Ernest Manning, who held office from 1943 to 1968. The riding was last contested in the 2019 Alberta election.

== History ==
The electoral district was created in the 1993 boundary redistribution when Edmonton-Belmont was merged with a portion of Edmonton-Beverly. The 2010 boundary redistribution saw some changes made on the south and west boundaries. The first was a minor revision that pushed the south boundary north to 144 Avenue to give some land to Edmonton-Beverly-Clareview. The second revision was made with Edmonton-Decore on the west side that moved a small portion of the west boundary from 59A Street to 66 Street to gain some land from that district. Manning also lost some land to Decore when it expanded the west to 66 Street from 82 Street and north from 137 Avenue to 144 Avenue.

=== Boundary history ===
34 Edmonton-Manning 2003 boundaries
Bordering districts
North	East	West	South
Athabasca-Redwater	Athabasca-Redwater, Fort Saskatchewan-Vegreville and Strathcona	Athabasca-Redwater and Edmonton-Decore	Edmonton-Beverly-Clareview
riding map goes here			
Legal description from the Statutes of Alberta 2003, Electoral Divisions Act.
Starting at the intersection of 66 Street with the north Edmonton city boundary; then 1. east, north, east and south along the city boundary to the right bank of the North Saskatchewan River near the easterly extension of 211 Avenue NE; 2. west along the right bank of the North Saskatchewan River to the easterly extension of 137 Avenue; 3. west along the extension and 137 Avenue to 36 Street; 4. north along 36 Street to 144 Avenue; 5. west along 144 Avenue to the Canadian National Railway (CNR) line; 6. southwest along the CNR line to 137 Avenue; 7. west along 137 Avenue to 82 Street; 8. north along 82 Street to 153 Avenue; 9. east along 153 Avenue to 59A Street; 10. north along 59A Street and its extension to 167 Avenue; 11. west along 167 Avenue to 66 Street; 12. north along 66 Street to the starting point.
Note:

37 Edmonton-Manning 2010 boundaries
Bordering districts
North	East	West	South
Athabasca-Sturgeon-Redwater	Fort Saskatchewan-Vegreville	Athabasca-Sturgeon-Redwater and Edmonton-Decore	Edmonton-Beverly-Clareview
Legal description from the Statutes of Alberta 2010, Electoral Divisions Act.

=== Representation history ===
Members of the Legislative Assembly for Edmonton-Manning
Assembly	Years	Member	Party
See Edmonton-Belmont 1971-1993 and Edmonton-Beverly 1971-1993
23rd	1993–1997	Peter Sekulic	Liberal
24th	1997–2001	Ed Gibbons	Liberal
25th	2001–2004	Tony Vandermeer	Progressive; Conservative
26th	2004–2006	Dan Backs	Liberal
26th	2006-2008	Dan Backs	Independent
27th	2008–2012	Peter Sandhu	Progressive; Conservative
28th	2012–2015	Peter Sandhu	Progressive; Conservative
29th	2015–2019	Heather Sweet	New Democrat
30th	2019-2023	Heather Sweet	New Democrat
31st	2023–present	Heather Sweet	New Democrat

The first election contested in the district occurred in 1993. That election saw incumbent Edmonton-Belmont NDP MLA Tom Sigurdson run for a third term in office. He was defeated by Liberal candidate Peter Sekulic, who won over half the popular vote.

Sekulic would not stand for a second term in office. The 1997 election was won by Liberal candidate Ed Gibbons, who defeated Progressive Conservative candidate Tony Vandermeer in a closely contested race. Both candidates ran against each-other again in 2001, during which Vandermeer was elected and Gibbons finished second in the popular vote.

Vandermeer ran for a second term in office in the 2004 election. He was defeated by Liberal candidate Dan Backs, who took the riding with just over 36% of the popular vote. Backs would be expelled from the Liberal caucus on November 20, 2006, and ran for re-election as an independent candidate. He was not re-elected as an independent.

The race in 2008 ended up being closely contested, between candidates from all four major political parties. Backs ended up finishing a close third place. He was defeated by Progressive Conservative candidate Peter Sandhu, who won just under 36% of the popular vote. The second, third and fourth place candidates all finished with just about 2,300 votes.

During the 2015 election, NDP challenger Heather Sweet was elected with 71.5% of the popular vote, defeating Progressive Conservative challenger Gurcharan Garcha who finished second in terms of the popular vote in the riding.

== Legislative election results ==
=== Elections in the 1990s ===
1993 Alberta general election: Edmonton-Manning
Party	Candidate	Votes	%
Liberal	Peter Sekulic	6,007	51.22
New Democratic	Tom Sigurdson	2,904	24.76
Progressive Conservative	Tony Kallal	2,521	21.50
Social Credit	George Grant	296	2.52
Total valid votes		11,728	
Rejected, spoiled and declined		24	
Eligible electors / Turnout		20,585	57.09
Liberal pickup new district.			
Source(s) "Edmonton-Manning results 1993 Alberta general election". Alberta Heritage Community Foundation.

1997 Alberta general election: Edmonton-Manning
Party	Candidate	Votes	%	±%
Liberal	Ed Gibbons	5,140	41.96	-9.26
Progressive Conservative	Tony Vandermeer	4,358	35.57	+14.07
New Democratic	Hana Razga	2,229	18.19	-6.57
Social Credit	Jordan Harris	524	4.28	+1.76
Total valid votes		12,251		
Rejected, spoiled and declined		46		
Eligible electors / Turnout		24,134	50.95	-6.14
Liberal hold		Swing		-11.67
Source(s) "1997 General Election". Elections Alberta. Archived from the original on February 14, 2012.

=== Elections in the 2000s ===
2001 Alberta general election: Edmonton-Manning
Party	Candidate	Votes	%	±%
Progressive Conservative	Tony Vandermeer	5,903	45.54	+9.97
Liberal	Ed Gibbons	5,523	42.60	+0.64
New Democratic	Hana Razga	1,538	11.86	-6.33
Total valid votes		12,964		
Rejected, spoiled and declined		50		
Eligible electors / Turnout		26,021	50.01	-0.94
Progressive Conservative gain from Liberal		Swing		+5.31%
Source(s) "Edmonton-Manning Official Results 2001 Alberta general election" (PDF). Elections Alberta.

2004 Alberta general election: Edmonton-Manning
Party	Candidate	Votes	%	±%
Liberal	Dan Backs	3,929	36.08	-6.58
Progressive Conservative	Tony Vandermeer	3,647	33.49	-12.05
New Democratic	Laurie Lang	2,383	21.89	+10.03
Alberta Alliance	Mike Pietramala	532	4.89	
Greens	Ross Adshead	240	2.20	
Social Credit	Sean Tisdall	158	1.45	
Total valid votes		10,889		
Rejected, spoiled and declined		53		
Eligible electors / Turnout		25,163	43.49	-6.52
Liberal hold		Swing		+2.74
Source(s) "Edmonton-Manning Statement of Official Results 2004 Alberta general election" (PDF). Elections Alberta.

2008 Alberta general election: Edmonton-Manning
Party	Candidate	Votes	%	±%
Progressive Conservative	Peter Sandhu	4,107	35.79	+2.30
New Democratic	Rick Murti	2,307	20.11	-1.78
Independent	Dan Backs	2,275	19.83	
Liberal	Sandeep Dhir	2,260	19.70	-13.79
Wildrose Alliance	Phil Gamache	289	2.52	-2.37
Greens	Odette Boily	235	2.05	-0.15
Total valid votes		11,473		
Rejected, spoiled and declined		51		
Eligible electors / Turnout		31,367	36.74	-6.75
Progressive Conservative gain from Independent		Swing		+2.04
Source(s) The Report on the March 3, 2008 Provincial General Election of the Twenty-seventh Legislative Assembly. Elections Alberta. July 28, 2008. pp. 306–311.

=== Elections in the 2010s ===
2012 Alberta general election: Edmonton-Manning
Party	Candidate	Votes	%	±%
Progressive Conservative	Peter Sandhu	5,454	39.73	+3.94
Wildrose	Peter Rodd	3,412	24.85	+22.33
New Democratic	Cindy Olsen	3,383	24.64	+4.53
Liberal	Jonathan Huckabay	1,089	7.93	-11.77
Alberta Party	Mark Wall	188	1.37	
Independent	Sam Hachem	103	0.75	
Evergreen	Chris Vallee	100	0.73	
Total valid votes		13,729		
Rejected, spoiled and declined		161		
Eligible electors / Turnout		28,953	47.97	+11.23
Progressive Conservative hold		Swing		-9.20
Source(s) Elections Alberta. "Electoral Division Results: Edmonton-Manning".

2015 Alberta general election: Edmonton-Manning
Party	Candidate	Votes	%	±%
New Democratic	Heather Sweet	12,376	71.84	+47.20
Progressive Conservative	Gurcharan Garcha	2,599	15.09	-24.64
Wildrose	Atiq Rehman	1,475	8.56	-16.29
Liberal	Adam Mounzer	776	4.50	-3.43
Total valid votes		17,226		
Rejected, spoiled, and declined		670		
Registered electors / turnout		34,664	51.63	+3.66
New Democratic gain from Progressive Conservative		Swing		+35.92
Source(s) Elections Alberta. "Electoral Division Results: Edmonton-Manning".

2015 Alberta general election redistributed results
Party	Votes	%
New Democratic	10,854	71.62
Progressive Conservative	2,297	15.16
Wildrose	1,324	8.74
Liberal	679	4.48
Source(s) Source: Ridingbuilder

2019 Alberta general election: Edmonton-Manning
Party	Candidate	Votes	%	±%
New Democratic	Heather Sweet	9,782	50.08	-21.55
United Conservative	Harry Grewal	7,468	38.23	+14.34
Alberta Party	Manwar Khan	1,692	8.66	
Alberta Advantage	Adam Cory	212	1.09	
Green	Chris Vallee	204	1.04	
Independence	Terris Kolybaba	176	0.90	
Total valid votes		19,534	99.44	
Rejected, spoiled and declined		110	0.56	
Turnout		19,644	59.86	
Eligible voters		32,815		
New Democratic hold		Swing		-17.94
Source(s) Elections Alberta. "Electoral Division Results: Edmonton-Manning".

=== 2023 ===
2023 Alberta general election: Edmonton-Manning
Party	Candidate	Votes	%	±%
New Democratic	Heather Sweet	10,547	59.76	+9.68
United Conservative	Albert Mazzocca	6,769	38.35	+0.12
Green	Derek Thompson	333	1.89	+0.84
Total		17,649	99.26	–
Rejected and declined		131	0.74	
Turnout		17,780	50.94	
Eligible voters		34,902		
New Democratic hold		Swing		+4.78
Source(s) Source: Elections Alberta

== Senate nominee election results ==
=== 2004 ===
2004 Senate nominee election results: Edmonton-Manning				Turnout 44.33%	
Affiliation	Candidate	Votes	% votes	% ballots	Rank
Progressive Conservative	Betty Unger	4,269	14.88%	46.73%	2
Independent	Link Byfield	3,357	11.70%	36.75%	4
Progressive Conservative	Bert Brown	3,124	10.89%	34.20%	1
Alberta Alliance	Michael Roth	2,955	10.30%	32.49%	7
Progressive Conservative	Cliff Breitkreuz	2,892	10.08%	31.66%	3
Alberta Alliance	Vance Gough	2,664	9.28%	29.16%	8
Independent	Tom Sindlinger	2,639	9.20%	28.89%	9
Alberta Alliance	Gary Horan	2,617	9.12%	28.65%	10
Progressive Conservative	David Usherwood	2,245	7.82%	24.58%	6
Progressive Conservative	Jim Silye	1,932	6.73%	21.15%	5
Total votes		28,694	100%		
Total ballots		9,135	3.14 votes per ballot		
Rejected, spoiled and declined		2,019			

Voters had the option of selecting four candidates on the ballot

== Nomination contests ==
UCP Edmonton-Manning nomination contest: February 22, 2023

Candidate	Votes	%
Alberto Mazzocca	139	63.2
Jaspreet Saggu	81	36.8
Total	220	100.0

== Student vote results ==
=== 2004 ===
Participating schools
J.J. Bowlen Catholic Junior High School
John D. Bracco School
McLeod School
York Academic School

On November 19, 2004, a student vote was conducted at participating Alberta schools to parallel the 2004 Alberta general election results. The vote was designed to educate students and simulate the electoral process for persons who have not yet reached the legal majority. The vote was conducted in 80 of the 83 provincial electoral districts with students voting for actual election candidates. Schools with a large student body that reside in another electoral district had the option to vote for candidates outside of the electoral district then where they were physically located.

2004 Alberta student vote results
Affiliation	Candidate	Votes	%
Liberal	Dan Backs	177	29.16%
Progressive Conservative	Tony Vandermeer	170	28.01%
NDP	Laurie Lang	146	24.05%
Alberta Alliance	Mike Pietramala	56	9.23%
Green	Ross Adshead	44	7.25%
Social Credit	Sean Tisdall	14	2.31%
Total		607	100%
Rejected, spoiled and declined		10	

=== 2012 ===
Affiliation	Candidate	Votes	%
Progressive Conservative	Peter Sandhu		%
Wildrose	Peter Rodd		
Liberal	Jonathan Huckabay		%
Alberta Party	Mark Wall		
NDP	Cindy Olsen		%
Total			100%

== See also ==
- List of Alberta provincial electoral districts
- Canadian provincial electoral districts
