= Sarich =

Sarich is a surname. It may refer to:

- Cory Sarich (born 1978), Canadian ice hockey player
- Drew Sarich (born 1975), American actor and singer
- Janice Sarich (born 1958), Canadian politician
- Ralph Sarich (born 1938), Australian engineer and businessman
- Vincent Sarich (1934-2012), American anthropologist
