= Julius Yankowsky =

Canadian politician

MLA for Edmonton-Beverly-Clareview
- In office 1997–2004
- Succeeded by: Ray Martin

MLA for Edmonton-Beverly-Belmont
- In office 1993–1997

Personal details
- Born: August 8, 1938 (age 88) Lamont, Alberta
- Party: Alberta Liberal Party; Progressive Conservative
- Spouse: Katherine Halisky
- Children: Jacqueline Steenson & Lorri Jankowski-Arndt
- Occupation: former surveyor, engineer, politician

Julius Edward Yankowsky (born August 8, 1938) is a former politician from Alberta, Canada. He served in the Legislative Assembly of Alberta from 1993 to 2004.

== Political career ==
Yankowsky first ran for the Alberta Legislature in the 1993 general election, in the electoral district of Edmonton-Beverly-Belmont for the Liberal Party. He defeated incumbent New Democrat MLA Ed Ewasiuk. A year into his first term in office Yankowsky crossed the floor to the Progressive Conservative Party. In the 1997 general election he was re-elected in the new electoral district of Edmonton Beverly-Clareview. In the 2001 general election he was re-elected with a comfortable plurality over five other candidates. In the 2004 Alberta general election he was defeated by former NDP Leader Ray Martin.

On June 1, 2006 Yankowsky was appointed to the board of directors of the newly formed Alberta Association of Former MLAs.

Legislative Assembly of Alberta
Preceded by New District	MLA Edmonton-Beverly-Belmont; 1993–1997	Succeeded by District Abolished
Preceded by New District	MLA Edmonton Beverly-Clareview; 1997–2004	Succeeded by Ray Martin
