= Edmonton-Beverly-Belmont =

Defunct provincial electoral district in Alberta, Canada

Alberta electoral district

Defunct provincial electoral district
- Legislature: Legislative Assembly of Alberta
- District created: 1993
- District abolished: 1997
- First contested: 1993
- Last contested: 1993

Edmonton-Beverly-Belmont was a provincial electoral district in Alberta, Canada, mandated to return a single member to the Legislative Assembly of Alberta using the first past the post method of voting from 1993 to 1997.

== History ==
The Edmonton-Beverly-Belmont electoral district was formed in the 1993 boundary redistribution from Edmonton-Beverly and Edmonton-Belmont electoral districts.

The Edmonton-Beverly-Belmont electoral district was abolished in the 1997 boundary redistribution and formed Edmonton-Beverly-Clareview.

=== Members of the Legislative Assembly (MLAs) ===
Members of the Legislative Assembly for Edmonton-Beverly-Belmont
Assembly	Years	Member	Party
See Edmonton-Beverly electoral district from 1971-1993 and Edmonton-Belmont electoral district from 1971-1993
23rd	1993–1997	Julius Yankowsky	Liberal
See Edmonton-Beverly-Clareview electoral district from 1997-Present

== Election results ==
=== 1993 ===
1993 Alberta general election
Party	Candidate	Votes	%	±%
Liberal	Julius Yankowsky	5,037	47.25%	–
Progressive Conservative	Brian Hlus	3,060	28.70%	–
New Democratic	Ed Ewasiuk	2,473	23.20%	–
Natural Law	Ria Kinzel	91	0.85%	–
Total		10,661	–	–
Rejected, spoiled, and declined		7	–	–
Eligible electors / turnout		19,493	54.73%	–
Liberal pickup new district.				
Source(s) Source: "Edmonton-Beverly-Belmont Official Results 1993 Alberta general election". Alberta Heritage Community Foundation.

== See also ==
- List of Alberta provincial electoral districts
- Canadian provincial electoral districts
- Beverly, Edmonton
- Belmont, Edmonton
