= Edmonton-Beverly-Clareview =

Provincial electoral district in Alberta, Canada

Coordinates: 53.59°N 113.38°W

Alberta electoral district
- Edmonton-Beverly-Clareview within the City of Edmonton, 2017 boundaries

Provincial electoral district
- Legislature: Legislative Assembly of Alberta
MLA
Peggy Wright
New Democratic
- District created: 1996
- First contested: 1997
- Last contested: 2023

Edmonton-Beverly-Clareview is a provincial electoral district for the Legislative Assembly of Alberta, Canada. The electoral district covers the neighbourhoods of Beverly, Belmont Park and Clareview Town Centre. It was created in 1996, and was first contested in the 1997 election. It was last contested in the 2023 election, and is currently held by Peggy Wright of the NDP.

== History ==
The electoral district was created in the 1996 boundary redistribution from the old electoral district of Edmonton-Beverly-Belmont. In the 2010 boundary redistribution the riding boundaries were extended north into Edmonton-Manning from 137 Avenue to 144 Avenue while the south boundaries were extended to take a large portion from Edmonton-Highlands-Norwood.

=== Boundary history ===
25 Edmonton-Beverly-Clareview 2003 boundaries
Bordering districts
| North | East | West | South |
|---|---|---|---|
| Edmonton-Manning | Strathcona | Edmonton-Decore | Edmonton-Highlands-Norwood, Sherwood Park |
| riding map goes here | | | |
Legal description from the Statutes of Alberta 2003, Electoral Divisions Act.
Starting at the intersection of 82 Street with 137 Avenue; then 1. east along 137 Avenue to its intersection with the Canadian National Railway (CNR); 2. northeasterly along the CNR to its intersection with 144 Avenue; 3. east along 144 Avenue to 36 Street; 4. south along 36 Street to 137 Avenue; 5. east along 137 Avenue and its extension to the right bank of the North Saskatchewan River; 6. generally northeast along the right bank of the North Saskatchewan River to the east Edmonton city boundary; 7. south and west along the east city boundary to the right bank of the North Saskatchewan River; 8. north along the right river bank to the east bound lanes of the Yellowhead Trail; 9. northwest along the east bound lanes of Yellowhead Trail to Victoria Trail; 10. southwest along Victoria Trail to 118 Avenue; 11. west along 118 Avenue to 50 Street; 12. north along 50 Street to Yellowhead Trail; 13. west along Yellowhead Trail to 66 Street; 14. north along 66 Street to the CNR line; 15. west along the CNR line to 82 Street; 16. north along 82 Street to the starting point.
Note:

28 Edmonton-Beverly-Clareview 2010 boundaries
Bordering districts
| North | East | West | South |
|---|---|---|---|
| Edmonton-Manning | Fort Saskatchewan-Vegreville | Edmonton-Decore and Edmonton-Highlands-Norwood | Edmonton-Gold Bar and Sherwood Park |
Legal description from the Statutes of Alberta 2010, Electoral Divisions Act.

=== Electoral history overview ===
Members of the Legislative Assembly for Edmonton-Beverly-Clareview
| Assembly | Years | Member | Party |
|---|---|---|---|
See Edmonton-Beverly-Belmont 1993-1997
| 24th | 1997-2001 | Julius Yankowsky | Progressive Conservative |
| 25th | 2001-2004 | Julius Yankowsky | Progressive Conservative |
| 26th | 2004-2008 | Ray Martin | New Democrat |
| 27th | 2008-2012 | Tony Vandermeer | Progressive Conservative |
| 28th | 2012–2015 | Deron Bilous | New Democrat |
| 29th | 2015–2019 | Deron Bilous | New Democrat |
| 30th | 2019-2023 | Deron Bilous | New Democrat |
| 31st | 2023-present | Peggy Wright | New Democrat |

The electoral district of Edmonton-Beverly-Clareview was created in the 1997 general election from most of the electoral district of Edmonton-Beverly-Belmont. The district has been somewhat of a swing riding since its creation with the Liberals, New Democrats and Progressive Conservatives all holding a sizable base in the district. While the Liberals have received high numbers of votes, only the Progressive Conservatives and New Democrats have returned MLAs from the riding.

The first Member for the riding was incumbent Julius Yankowsky, who had crossed the floor to the Progressive Conservatives from the Liberals. He won the new district in a close three-way race. He won his third term in the 2001 election with a higher margin of victory.

Despite having three terms of incumbency, Yankowsky was unable to win a third term in office. He faced former New Democratic Party leader Ray Martin, who defeated him taking just over half the popular vote in the district.

Martin held until the 2008 election, after which Edmonton-Manning MLA Tony Vandermeer defeated Martin in a closely contested race. Vandermeer was defeated by New Democrat Deron Bilous in the 2012 provincial election, who was re-elected in the 2015 provincial election with a majority of 9,525 and 73.8% of the popular vote.

== Legislative election results ==
=== 1997 ===
1997 Alberta general election
| Party | Candidate | Votes | % | ±% |
|---|---|---|---|---|
| Progressive Conservative | Julius E. Yankowsky | 3,484 | 34.99% | – |
| Liberal | Johanne Tardif | 3,127 | 31.40% | – |
| New Democratic | Bill Stephenson | 2,842 | 28.54% | – |
| Social Credit | Doug Smith | 376 | 3.78% | – |
| Independent | Andy Chichak | 100 | 1.00% | – |
| Forum | Bill Finn | 29 | 0.29% | – |
| Total | | 9,958 | – | – |
| Rejected, spoiled and declined | | 10 | 22 | 6 |
| Eligible electors / turnout | | 19,847 | 50.25% | – |
| Progressive Conservative pickup new district. | | | | |
Source(s) Source: "Edmonton-Beverly-Clareview Official Results 1997 Alberta general election". Alberta Heritage Community Foundation. Alberta. Chief Electoral Officer (1997). Report of the Chief Electoral Officer, November, 1996 general enumeration and Tuesday, March 11, 1997 general election Twenty-fourth Legislative Assembly. Edmonton: Alberta Legislative Assembly, Office of the Chief Electoral Officer.

=== 2001 ===
2001 Alberta general election
| Party | Candidate | Votes | % | ±% |
|---|---|---|---|---|
| Progressive Conservative | Julius E. Yankowsky | 4,732 | 45.65% | 10.66% |
| Liberal | Bauni Mackay | 3,290 | 31.74% | 0.34% |
| New Democratic | Elisabeth Ballermann | 1,985 | 19.15% | -9.39% |
| Independent | Ken Shipka | 211 | 2.04% | 1.03% |
| Alberta First | Teo Zanetic | 92 | 0.89% | – |
| Independent | Tanya Gill | 56 | 0.54% | -0.46% |
| Total | | 10,366 | – | – |
| Rejected, spoiled and declined | | 8 | 17 | 0 |
| Eligible electors / Turnout | | 21,290 | 48.73% | -1.53% |
| Progressive Conservative hold | | Swing | | 5.16% |
Source(s) Source: "Edmonton-Beverly-Clareview Official Results 2001 Alberta general election". Alberta Heritage Community Foundation. Alberta. Chief Electoral Officer (2001). The report of the Chief Electoral Officer on the 2000 provincial confirmation process and Monday, March 12, 2001, Provincial General Election of the twenty-fifth Legislative Assembly. Edmonton: Alberta Legislative Assembly, Office of the Chief Electoral Officer.

=== 2004 ===
2004 Alberta general election
| Party | Candidate | Votes | % | ±% |
|---|---|---|---|---|
| New Democratic | Ray Martin | 5,259 | 50.83% | 31.68% |
| Progressive Conservative | Julius E. Yankowsky | 3,041 | 29.39% | -16.26% |
| Liberal | Sam Parmar | 1,164 | 11.25% | -20.49% |
| Alberta Alliance | Philip Gamache | 458 | 4.43% | – |
| Social Credit | Ken Shipka | 283 | 2.74% | – |
| Green | Benoit Couture | 141 | 1.36% | – |
| Total | | 10,346 | – | – |
| Rejected, spoiled and declined | | 35 | 53 | 1 |
| Eligible electors / Turnout | | 23,569 | 44.05% | -4.68% |
| New Democratic gain from Progressive Conservative | | Swing | | 3.76% |
Source(s) Source: "00 - Edmonton-Beverly-Clareview, 2004 Alberta general election". officialresults.elections.ab.ca. Elections Alberta. Alberta. Chief Electoral Officer (2005). Report of the Chief Electoral Officer on the General Enumeration and General Election of the Twenty-sixth Legislative Assembly (Report). Edmonton: Alberta Legislative Assembly, Office of the Chief Electoral Officer.

=== 2008 ===
2008 Alberta general election
| Party | Candidate | Votes | % | ±% |
|---|---|---|---|---|
| Progressive Conservative | Tony Vandermeer | 4,182 | 39.63% | 10.24% |
| New Democratic | Ray Martin | 3,845 | 36.44% | -14.39% |
| Liberal | Dawit Isaac | 1,996 | 18.92% | 7.67% |
| Wildrose Alliance | Brian Dell | 289 | 2.74% | -1.69% |
| Green | Frédérique Pivot | 183 | 1.73% | 0.37% |
| Social Credit | Robin Porteous | 57 | 0.54% | -2.20% |
| Total | | 10,552 | – | – |
| Rejected, spoiled and declined | | 20 | 21 | 3 |
| Eligible electors / Turnout | | 28,057 | 37.69% | -6.36% |
| Progressive Conservative gain from New Democratic | | Swing | | -9.12% |
Source(s) Source: "25 - Edmonton-Beverly-Clareview, 2008 Alberta general election". officialresults.elections.ab.ca. Elections Alberta. Chief Electoral Officer (2008). The Report on the March 3, 2008 Provincial General Election of the Twenty-Seventh Legislative Assembly (Report). Edmonton, Alta.: Elections Alberta.

=== 2012 ===
2012 Alberta general election
| Party | Candidate | Votes | % | ±% |
|---|---|---|---|---|
| New Democratic | Deron Bilous | 5,264 | 36.97% | 0.53% |
| Progressive Conservative | Tony Vandermeer | 5,019 | 35.25% | -4.38% |
| Wildrose Alliance | Don Martin | 2,909 | 20.43% | 17.69% |
| Liberal | Chris Heward | 895 | 6.29% | -12.63% |
| Evergreen | Trey Capnerhurst | 151 | 1.06% | -0.67% |
| Total | | 14,238 | – | – |
| Rejected, spoiled and declined | | 39 | 63 | 11 |
| Eligible electors / turnout | | 30,610 | 46.68% | 8.99% |
| New Democratic gain from Progressive Conservative | | Swing | | -0.74% |
Source(s) Source: "28 - Edmonton-Beverly-Clareview, 2012 Alberta general election". officialresults.elections.ab.ca. Elections Alberta. Chief Electoral Officer (2012). The Report of the Chief Electoral Officer on the 2011 Provincial Enumeration and Monday, April 23, 2012 Provincial General Election of the Twenty-eighth Legislative Assembly (PDF) (Report). Edmonton, Alta.: Elections Alberta. Archived (PDF) from the original on May 6, 2021.

=== 2015 ===
2015 Alberta general election
| Party | Candidate | Votes | % | ±% |
|---|---|---|---|---|
| New Democratic | Deron Bilous | 12,049 | 73.80% | 36.83% |
| Progressive Conservative | Tony Caterina | 2,524 | 15.46% | -19.79% |
| Wildrose | Stephanie Diacon | 1,248 | 7.64% | -12.79% |
| Liberal | Tomi Yellowface | 359 | 2.20% | -4.09% |
| Alberta Party | Owais Siddiqui | 147 | 0.90% | – |
| Total | | 16,327 | – | – |
| Rejected, spoiled and declined | | 54 | 74 | 19 |
| Eligible electors / turnout | | 35,318 | 46.44% | -0.24% |
| New Democratic hold | | Swing | | 28.31% |
Source(s) Source: "28 - Edmonton-Beverly-Clareview, 2015 Alberta general election". officialresults.elections.ab.ca. Elections Alberta. Chief Electoral Officer (2016). 2015 General Election. A Report of the Chief Electoral Officer (PDF) (Report). Edmonton, Alta.: Elections Alberta.

=== 2019 ===
2019 Alberta general election
| Party | Candidate | Votes | % | ±% |
|---|---|---|---|---|
| New Democratic | Deron Bilous | 8,834 | 50.63 | -23.17 |
| United Conservative | David Egan | 6,308 | 36.15 | +13.05 |
| Alberta Party | Jeff Walters | 1,283 | 7.35 | +6.45 |
| Liberal | Shadea Hussein | 494 | 2.83 | +0.63 |
| Alberta Independence | Paul A. Burts | 240 | 1.38 | – |
| Green | Michael Hunter | 206 | 1.18 | – |
| Independent | Andy Andrzej Gudanowski | 84 | 0.48 | – |
| Total | | 17,449 | 99.38 | – |
| Rejected, spoiled and declined | | 109 | 0.62 | -0.27 |
| Turnout | | 17,558 | 56.26 | +9.61 |
| Eligible electors | | 31,211 | | |
| New Democratic hold | | Swing | | -18.11 |
Source(s) Source: "27 - Edmonton-Beverly-Clareview, 2019 Alberta general election". officialresults.elections.ab.ca. Elections Alberta. Alberta. Chief Electoral Officer (2019). 2019 General Election. A Report of the Chief Electoral Officer. Volume II (PDF) (Report). Vol. 2. Edmonton, Alta.: Elections Alberta. ISBN 978-1-988620-12-1.

=== 2023 ===
2023 Alberta general election
| Party | Candidate | Votes | % | ±% |
|---|---|---|---|---|
| New Democratic | Peggy Wright | 8,510 | 57.66 | +7.03 |
| United Conservative | Luke Suvanto | 5,690 | 38.55 | +2.40 |
| Green | Michael Hunter | 337 | 2.28 | +1.10 |
| Independent | Andrzej (Andy) Gudanowski | 222 | 1.50 | +1.02 |
| Total | | 14,759 | 99.31 | – |
| Rejected and declined | | 102 | 0.69 | |
| Turnout | | 14,861 | 48.99 | |
| Eligible voters | | 30,336 | | |
| New Democratic hold | | Swing | | +2.32 |
Source(s) Source: Elections Alberta

== Senate nominee election results ==
=== 2004 ===
| 2004 Senate nominee election results: Edmonton-Beverly-Clareview | | | | Turnout 44.20% | |
| Affiliation | Candidate | Votes | % votes | % ballots | Rank |
| Progressive Conservative | Betty Unger | 3,790 | 14.49% | 43.57% | 2 |
| Independent | Link Byfield | 3,200 | 12.23% | 36.79% | 4 |
| Progressive Conservative | Bert Brown | 2,748 | 10.51% | 31.59% | 1 |
| Alberta Alliance | Michael Roth | 2,695 | 10.30% | 30.98% | 7 |
| Independent | Tom Sindlinger | 2,558 | 9.78% | 29.41% | 9 |
| Progressive Conservative | Cliff Breitkreuz | 2,507 | 9.58% | 28.82% | 3 |
| Alberta Alliance | Gary Horan | 2,450 | 9.37% | 28.16% | 10 |
| Alberta Alliance | Vance Gough | 2,388 | 9.13% | 27.45% | 8 |
| Progressive Conservative | David Usherwood | 2,005 | 7.67% | 23.05% | 6 |
| Progressive Conservative | Jim Silye | 1,817 | 6.94% | 20.89% | 5 |
| Total votes | | 26,158 | 100% | | |
| Total ballots | | 8,699 | 3.01 votes per ballot | | |
| Rejected, spoiled and declined | | 1,719 | | | |

Voters had the option of selecting four candidates on the ballot

== Nomination contests ==
UCP Edmonton-Beverly-Clareview nomination contest: December 20, 2022

| Candidate | Round 1 | | Round 2 | |
| Candidate | Votes | % | Votes | % |
|---|---|---|---|---|
| Luke Suvanto | 69 | 45.7 | 78 | 58.6 |
| Lana Palmer | 43 | 28.5 | 55 | 41.4 |
| Felix Amenaghawon | 39 | 25.8 | Eliminated | |
| Total | 151 | 100.0 | 133 | 100.0 |

== Student vote results ==
=== 2004 ===
Participating schools
Balwin Jr High School
Beacon Heights Elementary

On November 19, 2004, a student vote was conducted at participating Alberta schools to parallel the 2004 Alberta general election results. The vote was designed to educate students and simulate the electoral process for persons who have not yet reached the legal majority. The vote was conducted in 80 of the 83 provincial electoral districts with students voting for actual election candidates. Schools with a large student body that reside in another electoral district had the option to vote for candidates outside of the electoral district then where they were physically located.

2004 Alberta student vote results
| Affiliation | Candidate | Votes | % |
| NDP | Ray Martin | 94 | 35.47% |
| Green | Benoit Couture | 67 | 25.28% |
| Progressive Conservative | Julius Yankowsky | 44 | 16.60% |
| Alberta Alliance | Philip Gamache | 30 | 11.32% |
| Liberal | Sam Parmar | 16 | 6.04% |
| Social Credit | Ken Shipka | 14 | 5.29% |
| Total | | 265 | 100% |
| Rejected, spoiled and declined | | 9 | |

=== 2012 ===
2012 Alberta student vote results
| Affiliation | Candidate | Votes | % |
| Progressive Conservative | Tony Vandermeer | | |
| Wildrose | Don Martin | | |
| Liberal | Chris Heward | | % |
| NDP | Deron Bilous | | % |
| Total | | | 100% |

== See also ==
- List of Alberta provincial electoral districts
- Canadian provincial electoral districts
