= Forum Party of Alberta =

- Former provincial party
- Leader: Emil van der Poorten
- Founded: 1995
- Dissolved: 2004
- Ideology: Centrism; E-government; Electoral reform Environmentalism
- Colours: Green and blue

The Forum Party of Alberta was a political party in the Province of Alberta, Canada. The party was created on March 2, 1995.

It later became the Equity Party, which held its founding convention in May 2000. The Equity Party did not nominate candidates in the 2001 election, and the 2004 election.

The Equity Party had five basic goals, social tolerance for all Albertans, fiscal accountability, grass roots accountability, including revenue sharing between riding associations, environmental responsibility and reforming the First Past the Post electoral system.

The Equity Party had an unusual way of developing their policy structure. They used an online forum that they called their online think tank to help foster and develop policy, and policy discussion. The party declared itself a new kind of political party, organized around the Internet and electronic communications. The Forum party got its name from the Internet Forum idea. The name was later changed to represent their policy platform. Party members referred to themselves as Equitists. The main reason for the name change was to avoid confusion with the Reform party.

The party struggled to gain traction throughout its life span. The centrist policies and unique low-budget way of promoting itself did not capture the imagination or attention of many people. In 2001 Barry Pashak stepped down as leader and the website quietly disappeared. Emil van der Poorten, the man who replaced him as party president, seemingly became more interested in community activism and Edmonton municipal politics than reviving the party. The party was deregistered in 2004 under amended Elections Alberta rules that states a party must run one candidate in a provincial election.

== Election results ==
=== Overall results ===
Overall: 1997 Alberta general election
Candidates	Votes	Pop. %	Overall placement
4	597	0.06%	8 of 9

=== Candidate results ===
Candidate	Votes	Pop. %	District	Place
William Finn	29	0.30%	Edmonton Beverly-Clareview	6 of 6
Emil van der Poorten	98	0.90%	Edmonton Centre	5 of 6
Bruce Hinkley	279	2.20%	Wetaskiwin-Camrose	5 of 5
Don Ronaghan	191	2.10%	Lac La Biche-St. Paul	5 of 6

=== By-election results May 21, 1996 ===
Candidate	Votes	Pop. %	District	Place
William Finn	135	1.50%	Redwater	5 of 6

== Party leaders ==
- William Finn (1995–1997)
- Emil van der Poorten (1997–2000)
- Barry Pashak (2000–2001)
- Brent Johner (2001–2003)
- Emil van der Poorten (2003–2004)

== Board of directors at dissolution ==
- Emil van der Poorten, leader, party spokesperson
- Bruce Hinkley, chief financial officer
- Brent Johner, vice president

== See also ==
- List of Alberta general elections
- List of Alberta political parties
