= Edmonton-Decore =

Provincial electoral district in Alberta, Canada

Coordinates: 53.62°N 113.47°W

Alberta electoral district
- Edmonton-Decore within the City of Edmonton, 2017 boundaries

Provincial electoral district
- Legislature: Legislative Assembly of Alberta
MLA
Sharif Haji
New Democratic
- District created: 2004
- First contested: 2004
- Last contested: 2023

Edmonton-Decore is a provincial electoral district in Alberta, Canada. It is one of 87 districts mandated to return a single member to the Legislative Assembly of Alberta using the first past the post method of voting. It was most recently contested in the general election of 2019. The riding is located in north central Edmonton. It was created in the 2004 boundary redistribution out of a small part of Edmonton-Manning and most of Edmonton-Glengarry. The riding is named after Laurence Decore, former Leader of the Opposition and Mayor of Edmonton.

Neighbourhoods in this riding include: Kildare, Killarney, Northmount, Evansdale, Belle Rive, Mayliewan, Delwood, Glengarry, and Balwin.

The riding has been held by representatives of the Progressive Conservative, Liberal, and New Democratic parties since it was created. The current representative is New Democratic Party MLA Sharif Haji, who was first elected in the 2023 general election.

== History ==
The electoral district was created in the 2004 boundary redistribution from Edmonton-Glengary and Edmonton-Manning, and was first contested in the general election of 2004. The 2010 boundary redistribution saw the major changes made to the riding.

The western boundary with on 97 Street between the Edmonton city limits and 167 Avenue Edmonton-Castle Downs was moved east to cede land to that constituency. The south boundary with Edmonton-Highlands-Norwood was changed to move along 127 Street instead of the Canadian National Railway tracks. The east boundary saw significant changes as it was pushed eastward to 66 Street into Edmonton-Beverly-Clareview and Edmonton-Manning as far north as 144 Avenue from the railway tracks at 127 Street. The east boundary with Edmonton-Manning was also realigned to run on 66 Street north of 153 Avenue to give some land to Manning.

=== Boundary history ===
29 Edmonton-Decore 2003 boundaries
Bordering districts
North	East	West	South
Athabasca-Redwater	Edmonton-Beverly-Clareview and Edmonton-Manning	Edmonton-Castle Downs and Edmonton-Calder	Edmonton-Highlands-Norwood
riding map goes here			
Legal description from the Statutes of Alberta 2003, Electoral Divisions Act.
Starting at the intersection of 97 Street with the north Edmonton city boundary; then 1. east along the north city boundary to 66 Street; 2. south along 66 Street to 167 Avenue; 3. east along 167 Avenue to the extension of 59A Street; 4. south along the extension and 59A Street to 153 Avenue; 5. west along 153 Avenue to 82 Street; 6. south along 82 Street to the Canadian National Railway (CNR) line; 7. west along the CNR line to 97 Street; 8. north along 97 Street to the starting point.
Note:

32 Edmonton-Decore 2010 boundaries
Bordering districts
North	East	West	South
Athabasca-Sturgeon-Redwater	Edmonton-Beverly-Clareview and Edmonton-Manning	Edmonton-Calder and Edmonton-Castle Downs	Edmonton-Highlands-Norwood
Legal description from the Statutes of Alberta 2010, Electoral Divisions Act.

=== Electoral history ===
Edmonton-Decore
Assembly	Years	Member	Party
Riding created from Edmonton-Glengarry and Edmonton-Manning
26th	2004–2008	Bill Bonko	Liberal
27th	2008–2012	Janice Sarich	Progressive Conservative
28th	2012–2015	Janice Sarich	Progressive Conservative
29th	2015–2019	Chris Nielsen	New Democratic
30th	2019–2023	Chris Nielsen	New Democratic
31st	2023–Present	Sharif Haji	New Democratic

The first election held in the district was fought among Liberal candidate Bill Bonko Sr., a school trustee; incumbent Alberta Alliance MLA Gary Masyk whose old district had been abolished; and former Edmonton-Belmont Progressive Conservative MLA Walter Szwender. Bonko defeated the two incumbents and two other candidates.

In the 2008 general election Bonko was defeated by Progressive Conservative candidate Janice Sarich, who held the riding until 2015.

In the 2015 general election NDP Candidate Chris Nielsen was elected with 68% of the vote, in an election which saw every Edmonton riding return an NDP member.

== Election results ==
=== 2004 ===
2004 Alberta general election
Party	Candidate	Votes	%	±%
Liberal	Bill Bonko Sr.	4,434	44.84%	–
Progressive Conservative	Walter R. Szwender	3,007	30.41%	–
New Democratic	Shirley Barg	1,525	15.42%	–
Alberta Alliance	Gary Masyk	831	8.40%	–
Social Credit	Geoffrey Chevrier	91	0.92%	–
Total		9,888	–	–
Rejected, spoiled and declined		48	30	0
Eligible electors / Turnout		24,735	40.17%	–
Liberal pickup new district.				
Source(s) Source: "00 - Edmonton-Decore, 2004 Alberta general election". officialresults.elections.ab.ca. Elections Alberta. Alberta. Chief Electoral Officer (2005). Report of the Chief Electoral Officer on the General Enumeration and General Election of the Twenty-sixth Legislative Assembly (Report). Edmonton: Alberta Legislative Assembly, Office of the Chief Electoral Officer.

=== 2008 ===
2008 Alberta general election
Party	Candidate	Votes	%	±%
Progressive Conservative	Janice Sarich	4,577	45.71%	15.30%
Liberal	Bill Bonko Sr.	3,895	38.90%	-5.95%
New Democratic	Sid Sadik	1,301	12.99%	-2.43%
Green	Trey Capnerhust	241	2.41%	–
Total		10,014	–	–
Rejected, spoiled and declined		24	39	3
Eligible electors / Turnout		29,184	34.41%	-5.76%
Progressive Conservative gain from Liberal		Swing		-3.81%
Source(s) Source: "29 - Edmonton-Decore, 2008 Alberta general election". officialresults.elections.ab.ca. Elections Alberta. Chief Electoral Officer (2008). The Report on the March 3, 2008 Provincial General Election of the Twenty-Seventh Legislative Assembly (Report). Edmonton, Alta.: Elections Alberta.

=== 2012 ===
2012 Alberta general election
Party	Candidate	Votes	%	±%
Progressive Conservative	Janice Sarich	5,722	42.36%	-3.34%
Wildrose Alliance	Chris Bataluk	2,911	21.55%	–
New Democratic	Ali Haymour	2,721	20.15%	7.15%
Liberal	Ed Ammar	2,153	15.94%	-22.96%
Total		13,507	–	–
Rejected, spoiled and declined		99	62	4
Eligible electors / turnout		28,766	47.31%	12.91%
Progressive Conservative hold		Swing		7.00%
Source(s) Source: "32 - Edmonton-Decore, 2012 Alberta general election". officialresults.elections.ab.ca. Elections Alberta. Chief Electoral Officer (2012). The Report of the Chief Electoral Officer on the 2011 Provincial Enumeration and Monday, April 23, 2012 Provincial General Election of the Twenty-eighth Legislative Assembly (PDF) (Report). Edmonton, Alta.: Elections Alberta. Archived (PDF) from the original on May 6, 2021.

=== 2015 ===
2015 Alberta general election
Party	Candidate	Votes	%	±%
New Democratic	Chris Nielsen	10,531	67.91%	47.76%
Progressive Conservative	Janice Sarich	2,847	18.36%	-24.00%
Wildrose	Dean Miller	1,289	8.31%	-13.24%
Liberal	Bradley Whalen	691	4.46%	-11.48%
Green	Trey Capnerhurst	150	0.97%	–
Total		15,508	–	–
Rejected, spoiled and declined		47	37	21
Eligible electors / turnout		32,518	47.90%	0.59%
New Democratic gain from Progressive Conservative		Swing		14.37%
Source(s) Source: "32 - Edmonton-Decore, 2015 Alberta general election". officialresults.elections.ab.ca. Elections Alberta. Chief Electoral Officer (2016). 2015 General Election. A Report of the Chief Electoral Officer (PDF) (Report). Edmonton, Alta.: Elections Alberta.

2015 Alberta general election redistributed results
Party	Votes	%
New Democratic	11,536	68.71
Progressive Conservative	2,975	17.12
Wildrose	1,387	8.26
Liberal	750	4.47
Green	142	0.85
Source(s) Source: Ridingbuilder

=== 2019 ===
2019 Alberta general election
Party	Candidate	Votes	%	±%
New Democratic	Chris Nielsen	8,789	47.54	-21.17
United Conservative	Karen Principe	7,371	39.87	+13.89
Alberta Party	Ali Haymour	2,027	10.96	–
Alberta Independence	Virginia Bruneau	301	1.63	–
Total		18,488	98.79	–
Rejected, spoiled and declined		227	1.21	
Turnout		18,715	56.68	
Eligible electors		33,017		
New Democratic hold		Swing		-17.53
Source(s) Source: "30 - Edmonton-Decore, 2019 Alberta general election". officialresults.elections.ab.ca. Elections Alberta. Alberta. Chief Electoral Officer (2019). 2019 General Election. A Report of the Chief Electoral Officer. Volume II (PDF) (Report). Vol. 2. Edmonton, Alta.: Elections Alberta. pp. 116–119. ISBN 978-1-988620-12-1.

=== 2023 ===
2023 Alberta general election
Party	Candidate	Votes	%	±%
New Democratic	Sharif Haji	8,109	52.79	+5.25
United Conservative	Sayid Ahmed	6,326	41.18	+1.31
Alberta Party	Brent Tyson	631	4.11	-6.86
Liberal	Donald Slater	295	1.92	–
Total		15,361	99.26	–
Rejected and declined		114	0.74	
Turnout		15,475	47.04	
Eligible voters		32,898		
New Democratic hold		Swing		+1.97
Source(s) Source: Elections Alberta

== Senate nominee election results ==
=== 2004 ===
2004 Senate nominee election results: Edmonton-Decore				Turnout 40.28%	
Affiliation	Candidate	Votes	% votes	% ballots	Rank
Progressive Conservative	Betty Unger	3,839	14.86%	46.39%	2
Independent	Link Byfield	2,923	11.32%	35.32%	4
Progressive Conservative	Bert Brown	2,816	10.90%	34.03%	1
Alberta Alliance	Michael Roth	2,664	10.31%	32.19%	7
Alberta Alliance	Gary Horan	2,510	9.72%	30.33%	10
Progressive Conservative	Cliff Breitkreuz	2,502	9.69%	30.23%	3
Independent	Tom Sindlinger	2,485	9.62%	30.03%	9
Alberta Alliance	Vance Gough	2,400	9.29%	29.00%	8
Progressive Conservative	David Usherwood	1,961	7.59%	23.70%	6
Progressive Conservative	Jim Silye	1,728	6.70%	20.88%	5
Total votes		25,828	100%		
Total ballots		8,276	3.12 votes per ballot		
Rejected, spoiled and declined		1,688			

Voters had the option of selecting four candidates on the ballot

== Student vote results ==
=== 2004 ===
Participating schools
Archbishop O'Leary High School
Mee-Yah-Noh School
St. Cecilia School

On November 19, 2004, a student vote was conducted at participating Alberta schools to parallel the 2004 Alberta general election results. The vote was designed to educate students and simulate the electoral process for persons who have not yet reached the legal majority. The vote was conducted in 80 of the 83 provincial electoral districts with students voting for actual election candidates. Schools with a large student body that reside in another electoral district had the option to vote for candidates outside of the electoral district then where they were physically located.

2004 Alberta student vote results
Affiliation	Candidate	Votes	%
Liberal	Bill Bonko Sr.	447	58.97%
Progressive Conservative	Walter Szwender	106	13.98%
Social Credit	Geoffrey Chevrier	80	10.55%
NDP	Shirly Barg	71	9.37%
Alberta Alliance	Gary Masyk	54	7.13%
Total		758	100%
Rejected, spoiled and declined		19	

== See also ==
- List of Alberta provincial electoral districts
- Canadian provincial electoral districts
