= Dan Backs =

Canadian politician

Member of the Legislative Assembly of Alberta
- In office 22 November 2004 – 3 March 2008
- Preceded by: Tony Vandermeer
- Succeeded by: Peter Sandhu
- Constituency: Edmonton-Manning

Personal details
- Born: 15 December 1953 (age 72) Calgary, Alberta
- Party: Liberal (2004-2006); Independent (2006-2008)
- Other political affiliations: Progressive Conservative
- Education: University of Alberta

Dan Backs (born 15 December 1953) is a politician and former member of the Legislative Assembly of Alberta. He was elected as a Liberal candidate in the 2004 provincial election, but was kicked out of the Liberal caucus by leader Kevin Taft, who cited concerns about Backs' ability to work as a member of a team. He sat as an independent thereafter and, after failing to secure the Progressive Conservative nomination for his riding, sought re-election in that capacity as well. He finished third in the riding in the 2008 election.

== Early life ==
Backs was educated at St. Francis High School in Calgary, Alberta. He subsequently earned a Bachelor of Arts in political science from the University of Alberta and a heavy equipment certification from the Northern Alberta Institute of Technology. He also studied Spanish at the Enforex Language Institute in Marbella, Spain and the American language school in Antigua Guatemala, negotiations and creative writing at the University of Alberta's Faculty of Extension, farm electricity and wiring at Fairview College, and newswriting at the George Meany Institute in Washington, D.C.

Backs has worked in farming, construction, and pipelining. He has served as a negotiator for the Alberta Operating Engineers Association, and as secretary-treasurer of the Alberta and Northwest Territories Council of Labour.

== Politics ==
Backs ran for a seat to the Alberta Legislature for the first time in the 1979 Alberta general election. He ran for the Alberta Liberals in the electoral district of Lesser Slave Lake but was defeated by Larry Shaben finishing in last place in the field of four candidates.

He would attempt to gain a seat in the 1986 Edmonton municipal election, when he ran for Edmonton City Council as an alderman in Ward 1. He finished third of nine candidates, behind Bruce Campbell and Helen Paull, both of whom were elected (Edmonton's council is composed of two councillors from each of six wards).

He subsequently sought provincial office in the 2004 election, when he ran as a Liberal candidate in Edmonton-Manning. He defeated Progressive Conservative incumbent Tony Vandermeer and was elected to the Legislative Assembly of Alberta.

In November 2006, Backs was expelled from the Liberal caucus by party leader Kevin Taft. Taft attributed the decision to "ongoing friction" between Backs and his colleagues, with Backs expressing surprise and calling the ouster "bizarre". Although Backs had already received the Liberal nomination in Edmonton-Manning for the following election, Taft declared that he would not be running as a Liberal and that the party would find a different candidate. Backs then sought the Progressive Conservative nomination in his riding. Also contesting it were Vandermeer, his predecessor and last-time opponent, local homebuilder Peter Sandhu, and Backs' fellow former Liberal Emerson Mayers. Sandhu won the nomination, and Backs decided to contest the next election as an independent. In this election, he finished third behind Sandhu and New Democrat Rick Murti.

=== Legislative initiatives ===
In 2006, while still a Liberal, Backs sponsored the Labour Relations Code (First Collective Agreement) Amendment Act, a private member's bill designed to provide a first collective bargaining agreement after the certification of a union, to prevent the sort of labour conflict that had recently occurred between Lakeside Packers and the United Food and Commercial Workers. The bill had not come up for a second reading by the time the 2006 session of the legislature adjourned, and accordingly it died. In 2007, as an independent, Backs sponsored the Regulatory Accountability and Transparency Act, a private member's bill designed to reduce the red tape faced by Alberta business. It was supported by the Liberal, New Democratic, and Alberta Alliance caucuses. The Progressive Conservatives who spoke to the bill expressed a support for the concept of regulatory simplification - which they stated was a major goal of the government - but expressed some concerns with different specific elements of the bill. Ultimately, the bill was referred - with Backs' support - to the legislature's Standing Committee on Government Services, where it remained at the adjournment of the legislature's 2007 session.

== Election results ==
2008 Alberta general election results (Edmonton-Manning)		Turnout 39.8%	
Affiliation	Candidate	Votes	%
Progressive Conservative	Peter Sandhu	4,109	35.2%
NDP	Rick Murti	2,302	20.6%
Independent	Dan Backs	2,275	20.1%
Liberal	Sandeep Dhir	2,261	19.5%
Wildrose Alliance	Phil Gamache	287	2.6%
Green	Odette Boily	234	2.1%
2004 Alberta general election results (Edmonton-Manning)		Turnout 44.3%	
Affiliation	Candidate	Votes	%
Liberal	Dan Backs	3,873	35.9%
Progressive Conservative	Tony Vandermeer	3,646	33.8%
NDP	Laurie Lang	2,371	22.0%
Alberta Alliance	Mike Pietramala	515	4.8%
Green	Ross Adshead	240	2.2%
Social Credit	Sean Tisdall	130	1.2%
1986 Edmonton municipal election results (Ward 1)
Candidate		Votes	
Bruce Campbell		10,929	
Helen Paull		10,074	
Dan Backs		6,545	
Paul Norris		5,038	
Walter Coombs		2,320	
John Ludwig		2,104	
Mary Hislop-Perraton		864	
Roxanne Herbert		712	
Francis Dryden		490	
