= Ed Ewasiuk =

Canadian politician

MLA for Edmonton-Beverly
- In office 1986–1993
- Preceded by: Bill Diachuk
- Succeeded by: District abolished

Personal details
- Born: September 24, 1933 Vegreville, Alberta, Canada
- Died: April 14, 2006 (aged 72) Edmonton, Alberta, Canada
- Party: Alberta New Democratic Party

Edward William "Eddie" Ewasiuk (September 24, 1933 – April 14, 2006) was a labour activist, a city councilor in Edmonton, Alberta and a NDP Member of the Legislative Assembly in the Legislative Assembly of Alberta. He was born in Vegreville, Alberta.

== Early life ==
Ewasiuk was born on September 24, 1933, in Vegreville, Alberta. He was born to parents of Ukrainian descent. Ewasiuk was a labour activist with what was the Oil, Chemical and Atomic Workers Union. He served as a president of his local and then as a national vice-president. In 1980, he ran for city council in Edmonton's Northeast Ward 3 as part of the now-defunct Edmonton Voters' Association municipal party. and won, and was re-elected in 1983.

While serving as an Edmonton city councillor in 1984 and 1985, Ewasiuk cast the only vote in favor of proclaiming Gay and Lesbian Awareness Day. Though the motions were defeated both years, his support stood out as one of the earliest documented acts of municipal allyship for Edmonton's LGBTQ+ community.

== Provincial politics ==
In the 1986 Alberta general election, Ewasiuk stood for MLA as a New Democrat in the northeast riding of Edmonton-Beverly. He won easily, garnering almost 60% of the vote, in an NDP sweep of Edmonton under Ray Martin's leadership. He defeated powerful PC Cabinet minister Bill Diachuk. In City Hall and Legislature, Ewasiuk gained a reputation as a devout advocate of workers' rights and reducing poverty.

In the 1989 Alberta general election, Ewasiuk was re-elected with 50% of the vote. He was defeated in the 1993 Alberta general election by Julius Yankowsky in the new electoral district of Edmonton-Beverly-Belmont after his old electoral district of Edmonton-Beverly was redistributed.

== Later life and legacy ==
Ewasiuk died suddenly at his home in Edmonton in 2006. In 2007, a memorial bench for Ewasiuk was unveiled by the NDP and the CEP union facing Edmonton City Hall.
