= Peter Sandhu =

Canadian politician

MLA for Edmonton-Manning
- In office March 3, 2008 – May 5, 2015
- Preceded by: Dan Backs
- Succeeded by: Heather Sweet

Personal details
- Born: Parmjit Singh Sandhu; 1960 or 1961 (age 65–66) India
- Party: Progressive Conservative
- Spouse: Kamal
- Occupation: homebuilder

Parmjit Singh "Peter" Sandhu is a Canadian politician and former Member of the Legislative Assembly of Alberta representing the constituency of Edmonton-Manning as a Progressive Conservative.

== Early life ==
Sandhu, who grew up in a farming family, left his native India for Canada at the age of 18 in 1979, settling in the Vancouver area after marrying Kamal Sandhu. Two years later, he moved to Alberta and got a job at a steel factory. After a workplace injury in 1987 that negatively impacted his health, Peter Sandhu began building homes on the side while still working as a crane operator at the plant. For 10 years, he worked two jobs; a homebuilder and realtor by day and a crane operator by night. He later quit at the steel plant and focused on his homebuilding business, which he has now owned for 16 years.

Sandhu's uncle was an elected official in India, and he credits working on one of his campaigns with sparking his interest in politics and democracy.

== Controversy ==
Sandhu was under investigation from the Ethics Commissioner for allegedly failing to disclose all assets and liabilities, as well as for allegedly lying about his location on an affidavit. The Alberta government is also currently looking to recover $4,500 in unpaid corporate taxes from his company, NewView. Sandhu is also alleged to have orchestrated a smear campaign against an Edmonton journalist. Sandhu was found guilty of breaching the Conflicts of Interest Act by failing to disclose a number of court cases against his company while he lobbied for changes to the Builders' Lien Act, but the ethics commissioner determined there "was no underlying motive and no deliberate effort to mislead," and so imposed no penalties for this violation.

== Political career ==
Sandhu defeated the incumbent independent MLA Dan Backs by 1,834 votes to win Edmonton-Manning. Backs, elected as an Alberta Liberal in 2004, was ousted from caucus by leader Kevin Taft before the election. Backs placed third in the constituency, placing 27 votes behind runner-up Rick Murti of the Alberta New Democrats.

He sits on three legislative committees; Public Accounts, Private Bills and Public Safety and Security. He is also a Member of the Asia Advisory Council and the Pacific Northwest Economic Region (PNWER).

== Personal life ==
Sandhu married his wife Kamal in 1984. In 2003, Sandhu was awarded the Queen's Jubilee Medal, and in 2005, he served as a centennial ambassador during Alberta's 100th anniversary celebrations.

== Election results ==
2008 Alberta general election results ( Edmonton-Manning )		Turnout 39.8%	
Affiliation	Candidate	Votes	%
Progressive Conservative	Peter Sandhu	4,109	36%
Wildrose Alliance	Phil Gamache	287	3%
Liberal	Sandeep Dhir	2,261	20%
Green	Odette Boily	234	2%
NDP	Rick Murti	2,302	20%
Independent	Dan Backs	2,275	20%
Total		11,468	100%
