= Bill Diachuk =

Canadian politician (1929–2014)

Bill Wasyl Diachuk

Member of the Legislative Assembly of Alberta for Edmonton-Beverly
- In office August 30, 1971 – May 8, 1986
- Preceded by: New District
- Succeeded by: Ed Ewasiuk

Minister without Portfolio Responsible for occupational health and safety
- In office 1979 – May 1986
- Succeeded by: Peter Trynchy

Personal details
- Born: October 8, 1929 Vegreville, Alberta, Canada
- Died: October 17, 2014 (aged 85) Edmonton, Alberta, Canada
- Party: Progressive Conservative
- Occupation: politician

Bill Wasyl Diachuk (October 8, 1929 – October 17, 2014) was a municipal and provincial politician from Alberta, Canada. He began his political career in Edmonton municipal politics serving two separate stints as a separate school trustee. The first was from 1962 to 1964 and the second from 1966 to 1971. He moved his political career to the provincial level where he served as a member of the Legislative Assembly of Alberta sitting with the governing Progressive Conservative caucus from 1971 to 1986.

== Political career ==
Diachuk ran for election to the City of Edmonton Separate School Board. He won a seat in the 1962 Edmonton municipal election holding the third and final seat in plurality out of five candidates . He was defeated running for a second term in office in the 1964 Edmonton municipal election finishing eighth out of ten candidates. He attempted a return to the board in the 1966 municipal election this time winning the fifth place seat out of ten candidates. He was re-elected to his third term in the 1968 Edmonton municipal election again winning the fifth place seat out of twelve candidates.

Diachuk ran for a seat to the Alberta Legislature in the 1971 Alberta general election. He won the new electoral district of Edmonton-Beverly defeating incumbent Social Credit MLA Lou Heard. He also defeated future MLA Barrie Chivers who finished third out of fourth in the race. He vacated his school trustee seat after winning the provincial election.

Diachuk ran for re-election in the 1975 Alberta general election. He faced four other candidates and ended up winning a higher plurality and a substantially better margin of victory. He would run for his third term in office in the 1979 Alberta general election. His margin of victory would shrink as he faced a hotly contested challenge from New Democrat candidate Gene Mitchell and two other candidates.

After the election Premier Peter Lougheed appointed Diachuk to the provincial cabinet. He became a Minister without Portfolio Responsible for occupational health and safety.

Diachuk ran for his fourth term in office in the 1982 Alberta general election. He won a personal record for his highest popular vote. Despite having a ministerial portfolio he was nearly defeated by New Democrat candidate Winston Gereluk.

He would keep his portfolio when Don Getty became Premier in November 1985. Diachuk ran for a fifth term in office in the 1986 general election. The election saw his popular vote collapse compared to his 1982 results. He was defeated by New Democrat candidate Ed Ewasiuk in a landslide. On October 17, 2014, Diachuk died at the age of 85.
