= Edmonton-Beverly =

Defunct provincial electoral district in Alberta, Canada

Coordinates: 53.570°N 113.403°W

Alberta electoral district

Defunct provincial electoral district
- Legislature: Legislative Assembly of Alberta
- District created: 1971
- District abolished: 1993
- First contested: 1971
- Last contested: 1989

Edmonton-Beverly was a provincial electoral district in Alberta, Canada, mandated to return a single member to the Legislative Assembly of Alberta using the first past the post method of voting from 1971 to 1993.

== History ==
The Edmonton-Beverly electoral district was formed in the 1970 boundary redistribution from Edmonton North East.

The Edmonton-Beverly electoral district was abolished in the 1993 boundary redistribution, and formed Edmonton-Beverly-Belmont, with a small portion of the district was combined with Edmonton-Belmont to form Edmonton-Manning.

=== Members of the Legislative Assembly (MLAs) ===
Members of the Legislative Assembly for Edmonton-Beverly
Assembly	Years	Member	Party
See Edmonton North East electoral district from 1959-1971
17th	1971–1975	Bill Diachuk	Progressive Conservative
18th	1975–1979	Bill Diachuk	Progressive Conservative
19th	1979–1982	Bill Diachuk	Progressive Conservative
20th	1982–1986	Bill Diachuk	Progressive Conservative
21st	1986–1989	Ed Ewasiuk	New Democratic
22nd	1989–1993	Ed Ewasiuk	New Democratic
See Edmonton-Manning electoral district from 1993-Present and Edmonton-Beverly-Belmont electoral district from 1993-1997

== Election results ==
=== 1971 ===
1971 Alberta general election
Party	Candidate	Votes	%	±%
Progressive Conservative	Bill Diachuk	4,471	42.68%	–
Social Credit	Lou Heard	3,050	29.12%	–
New Democratic	Barrie Chivers	2,769	26.43%	–
Liberal	John Lambert	185	1.77%	–
Total		10,475	–	–
Rejected, spoiled and declined		60	–	–
Eligible electors / turnout		15,591	67.57%	–
Progressive Conservative pickup new district.				
Source(s) Source: "Edmonton-Beverly Official Results 1971 Alberta general election". Alberta Heritage Community Foundation.

=== 1975 ===
1975 Alberta general election
Party	Candidate	Votes	%	±%
Progressive Conservative	Bill Diachuk	5,046	61.94%	19.26%
New Democratic	Bill Kobluk	1,902	23.35%	-3.09%
Social Credit	Patrick Moore	764	9.38%	-19.74%
Liberal	Rudy Pisesky	374	4.59%	2.83%
Communist	Paul Jarbeau	60	0.74%	–
Total		8,146	–	–
Rejected, spoiled and declined		N/A	–	–
Eligible electors / turnout		16,882	48.25%	–
Progressive Conservative hold		Swing		12.51%
Source(s) Source: "Edmonton-Beverly Official Results 1975 Alberta general election". Alberta Heritage Community Foundation.

=== 1979 ===
1979 Alberta general election
Party	Candidate	Votes	%	±%
Progressive Conservative	Bill Diachuk	3,756	50.53%	-11.41%
New Democratic	Gene Mitchell	2,592	34.87%	11.52%
Social Credit	Pat G. A. O'Hara	854	11.49%	2.11%
Liberal	Teresa McKerral	231	3.11%	-1.48%
Total		7,433	–	–
Rejected, spoiled and declined		N/A	–	–
Eligible electors / turnout		13,741	54.09%	–
Progressive Conservative hold		Swing		-11.47%
Source(s) Source: "Edmonton-Beverly Official Results 1979 Alberta general election". Alberta Heritage Community Foundation.

=== 1982 ===
1982 Alberta general election
Party	Candidate	Votes	%	±%
Progressive Conservative	Bill Diachuk	6,894	50.62%	0.09%
New Democratic	Winston Gereluk	5,638	41.40%	6.53%
Western Canada Concept	Dexter B. Dombro	819	6.01%	–
Social Credit	Steve Kostiuk	268	1.97%	-9.52%
Total		13,619	–	–
Rejected, spoiled and declined		29	–	–
Eligible electors / turnout		21,759	62.72%	–
Progressive Conservative hold		Swing		-3.22%
Source(s) Source: "Edmonton-Beverly Official Results 1982 Alberta general election". Alberta Heritage Community Foundation.

=== 1986 ===
1986 Alberta general election
Party	Candidate	Votes	%	±%
New Democratic	Ed Ewasiuk	6,699	58.76%	17.37%
Progressive Conservative	Bill Diachuk	3,917	34.36%	-16.26%
Liberal	Jim Shinkaruk	784	6.88%	–
Total		11,400	–	–
Rejected, spoiled and declined		20	–	–
Eligible electors / turnout		24,854	45.95%	–
New Democratic gain from Progressive Conservative		Swing		7.59%
Source(s) Source: "Edmonton-Beverly Official Results 1986 Alberta general election". Alberta Heritage Community Foundation.

=== 1989 ===
1989 Alberta general election
Party	Candidate	Votes	%	±%
New Democratic	Ed Ewasiuk	6,408	49.48%	-9.28%
Progressive Conservative	Gary Kump	3,835	29.61%	-4.75%
Liberal	Daryl Robb	2,520	19.46%	12.58%
Independent	Bonny Royce	188	1.45%	–
Total		12,951	–	–
Rejected, spoiled and declined		17	–	–
Eligible electors / turnout		25,874	50.12%	–
New Democratic hold		Swing		-2.27%
Source(s) Source: "Edmonton-Beverly Official Results 1989 Alberta general election". Alberta Heritage Community Foundation.

== See also ==
- List of Alberta provincial electoral districts
- Canadian provincial electoral districts
- Beverly, a community and former town in Edmonton
