= Sharif Haji =

Canadian politician

Sharif Haji MLA

Member of the Legislative Assembly of Alberta for Edmonton-Decore
- Incumbent
- Assumed office May 29, 2023
- Preceded by: Chris Nielsen

Personal details
- Born: Baidoa, Somalia
- Party: Alberta NDP
- Education: University of Alberta

Sharif Haji is a member of the Legislative Assembly of Alberta representing the riding of Edmonton-Decore succeeding outgoing MLA Chris Nielsen. Haji is of Somali descent. On June 21, 2023, he served as the Official Opposition critic for Immigration and Accreditation. After which he was moved into the portfolio for Affordability and Utilities before being named Shadow Minister of Primary and Preventative Health Services by Naheed Nenshi, leader of the Alberta NDP, in October 2025. He is the first black Muslim and person of East African descent to be elected to the Legislative Assembly of Alberta.

== Education ==
Haji holds an undergraduate degree from the University of South Africa, as well as a master's degree in public health, with specialization on global health from the University of Alberta.

== Career ==
Before joining the Legislative Assembly, Sharif Haji served as executive director of the Africa Centre (2019–2023) and held various roles in the Alberta government (2014–2019), including manager of Alberta's provincial affordable housing strategy, and Alberta's primary health care strategy, and as a policy analyst. He also worked as a programs coordinator for the Edmonton Multicultural Coalition and co-founded the Federation of African Canadian Economics and has served on several boards, including the Centre for Race and Culture and the United Way - Alberta Capital Region's community impact councils.

Haji also received the Queen Elizabeth II platinum jubilee medal in 2023.

== Electoral history ==
2023 Alberta general election: Edmonton-Decore
| Party | Candidate | Votes | % | ±% |
|---|---|---|---|---|
| New Democratic | Sharif Haji | 8,109 | 52.79 | +5.25 |
| United Conservative | Sayid Ahmed | 6,326 | 41.18 | +1.31 |
| Alberta Party | Brent Tyson | 631 | 4.11 | -6.86 |
| Liberal | Donald Slater | 295 | 1.92 | – |
| Total | | 15,361 | 99.26 | – |
| Rejected and declined | | 114 | 0.74 | |
| Turnout | | 15,475 | 47.04 | |
| Eligible voters | | 32,898 | | |
| New Democratic hold | | Swing | | +1.97 |
Source(s) Source: Elections Alberta
