= Heather Sweet (politician) =

Canadian politician

Heather Sweet MLA
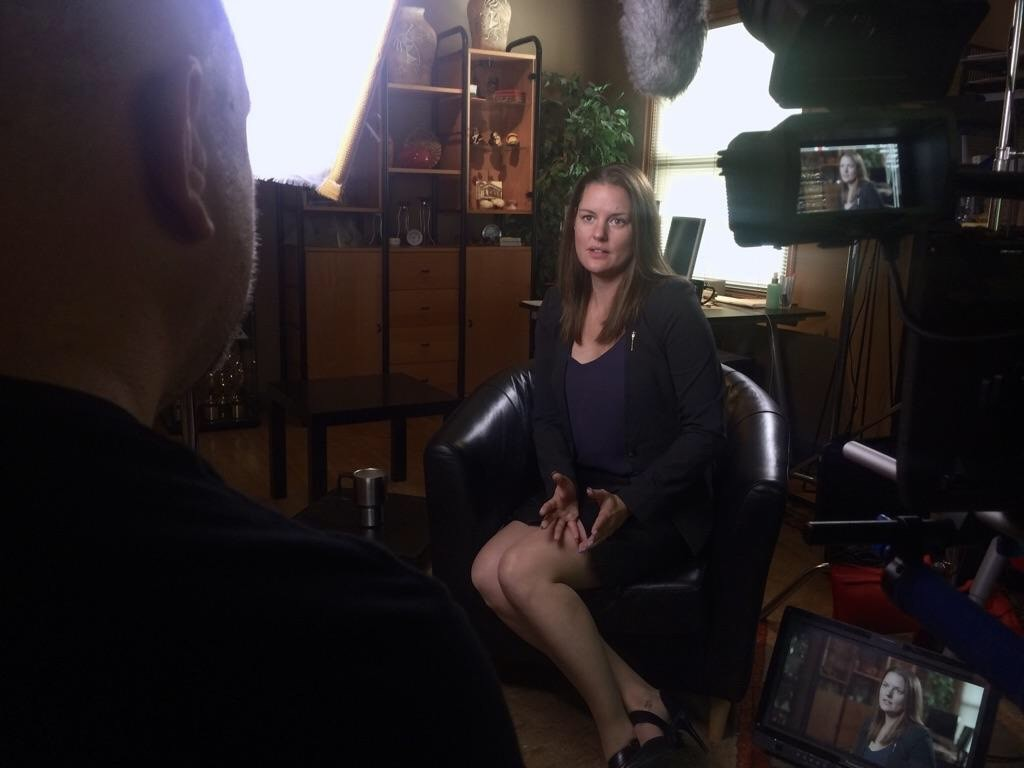
- Sweet in 2016

Member of the Legislative Assembly of Alberta for Edmonton-Manning
- Incumbent
- Assumed office May 5, 2015
- Preceded by: Peter Sandhu

Personal details
- Born: August 23, 1981 (age 44)
- Party: Alberta NDP
- Occupation: Social worker

Heather Dawn Sweet (born August 23, 1981) is a Canadian politician who serves as a Member of the Legislative Assembly of Alberta, representing the riding of Edmonton-Manning. She was elected in the 2015 Alberta election as a member of the New Democratic Party, and she was re-elected in 2019 and 2023. As of June 21, 2024, she serves as the Official Opposition critic for Agriculture and Forestry as well as for Rural Economic Development. She also serves as the Deputy Whip of the Official Opposition.

== Personal life ==
Before entering politics, Sweet worked as a registered social worker for more than 10 years, with one year working with the Métis Child and Family Services Society. Sweet worked in child protection services focusing on high-risk youth from 2005 to 2015.

== Electoral history ==
=== 2023 general election ===
2023 Alberta general election: Edmonton-Manning
Party	Candidate	Votes	%	±%
New Democratic	Heather Sweet	10,547	59.76	+9.68
United Conservative	Albert Mazzocca	6,769	38.35	+0.12
Green	Derek Thompson	333	1.89	+0.84
Total		17,649	99.26	–
Rejected and declined		131	0.74	
Turnout		17,780	50.94	
Eligible voters		34,902		
New Democratic hold		Swing		+4.78
Source(s) Source: Elections Alberta

=== 2019 general election ===
2019 Alberta general election: Edmonton-Manning
Party	Candidate	Votes	%	±%
New Democratic	Heather Sweet	9,782	50.08	-21.55
United Conservative	Harry Grewal	7,468	38.23	+14.34
Alberta Party	Manwar Khan	1,692	8.66	
Alberta Advantage	Adam Cory	212	1.09	
Green	Chris Vallee	204	1.04	
Independence	Terris Kolybaba	176	0.90	
Total valid votes		19,534	99.44	
Rejected, spoiled and declined		110	0.56	
Turnout		19,644	59.86	
Eligible voters		32,815		
New Democratic hold		Swing		-17.94
Source(s) Elections Alberta. "Electoral Division Results: Edmonton-Manning".

=== 2015 general election ===
2015 Alberta general election: Edmonton-Manning
Party	Candidate	Votes	%	±%
New Democratic	Heather Sweet	12,376	71.84	+47.20
Progressive Conservative	Gurcharan Garcha	2,599	15.09	-24.64
Wildrose	Atiq Rehman	1,475	8.56	-16.29
Liberal	Adam Mounzer	776	4.50	-3.43
Total valid votes		17,226		
Rejected, spoiled, and declined		670		
Registered electors / turnout		34,664	51.63	+3.66
New Democratic gain from Progressive Conservative		Swing		+35.92
Source(s) Elections Alberta. "Electoral Division Results: Edmonton-Manning".
