= Janice Sarich =

Canadian politician (1958–2021)

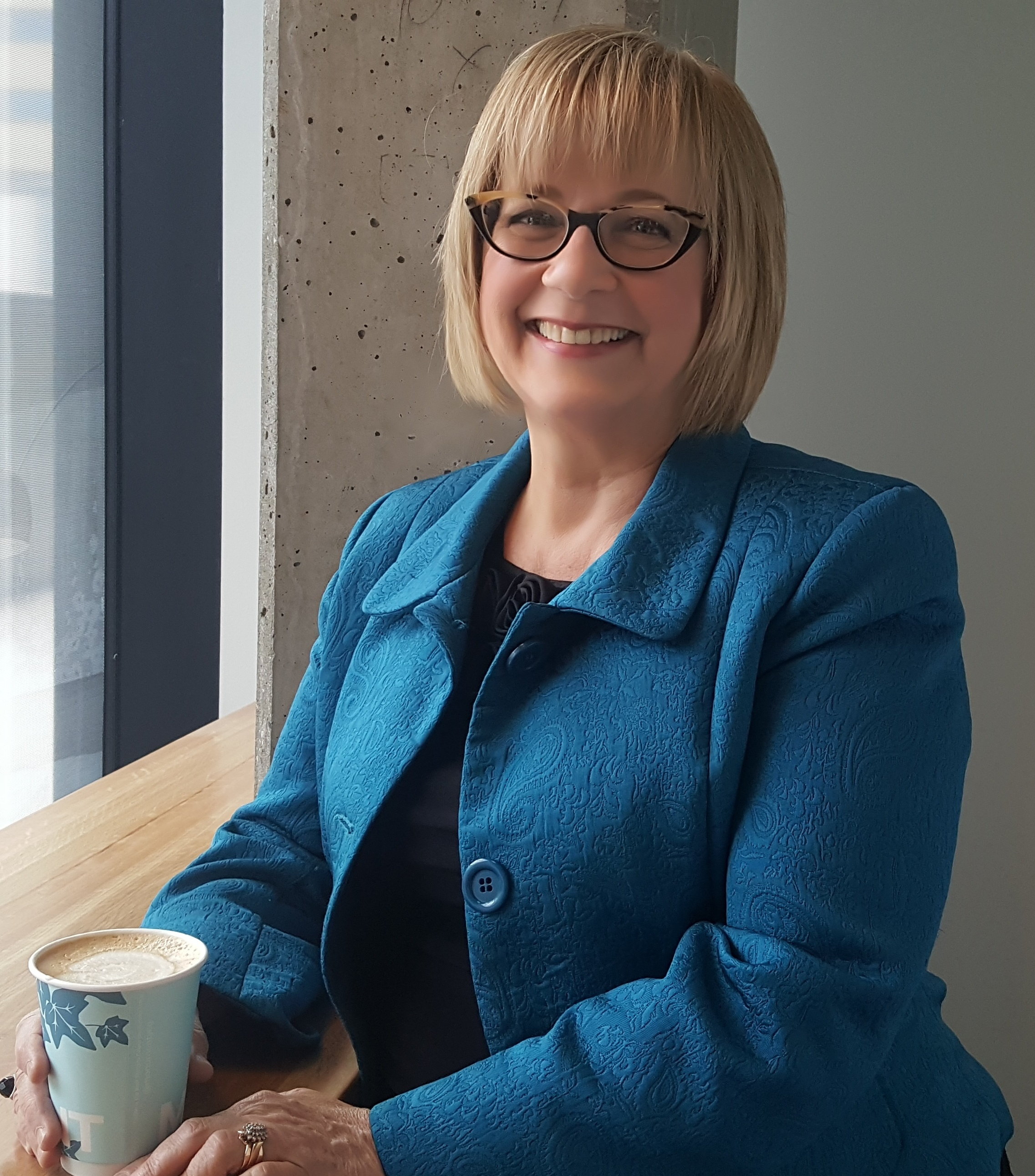
- Sarich in 2018

MLA for Edmonton-Decore
- In office 2008–2015
- Preceded by: Bill Bonko
- Succeeded by: Chris Nielsen

Personal details
- Born: April 26, 1958 Edmonton, Alberta, Canada
- Died: February 26, 2021 (aged 62)
- Party: Progressive Conservative
- Spouse: Steve Sarich
- Education: University of Alberta
- Occupation: Executive Business Strategist and small business owner

Janice Sarich (April 26, 1958 – February 26, 2021) was a Canadian provincial-level politician. She served as member of the Legislative Assembly of Alberta (MLA) from 2008 until 2015, representing the electoral constituency of Edmonton-Decore and sitting as a Progressive Conservative.

== Early life and career ==
Sarich was born in Edmonton in 1958. She was a fourth-generation Ukrainian Canadian. She obtained a Master of Education (Educational Administration) degree and a Bachelor of Physical Education (Administration) both from the University of Alberta. She held Project Management and Project Leadership certificates from the Northern Alberta Institute of Technology (NAIT), and from the Institute of Corporate Directors she held certificates in the ICD-Rotman (NFP) Governance Essentials Program and the ICD-Rotman Boardroom Financial Essentials. Prior to entering public life, Sarich was a small business owner and President of a business consulting company for over 20 years providing expertise in the areas of strategic planning, policy, and governance in the private and public sectors.

== Political career ==
Sarich's first bid into electoral politics was in 2001, when she ran for a seat in Ward 2 on the Edmonton Catholic School District's board of trustees. She defeated Ward 2 incumbent trustee Ronald Zapisocki by 602 votes to win the seat. During her first term, Sarich earned a reputation as a tight fiscal conservative, at times calling on the board to have its budget audited after reporting a 10 million dollar deficit. In her bid for re-election in 2004, Sarich polled the most votes out of all 14 candidates in the Catholic district race and outpolled her Ward 2 opponent Jim Urlacher by a margin of almost 2 to 1. She did not seek re-election in 2007, allowing her to run for a seat in the Alberta Legislature.

In the 2008 provincial election, Sarich received 46% of the vote and defeated Liberal incumbent Bill Bonko by 682 votes to win the constituency of Edmonton-Decore. Following the election, Sarich was appointed to Cabinet by Premier Ed Stelmach to the position of Parliamentary Assistant to the Education Minister, Dave Hancock and served in this role until 2011. Highlights while serving as Parliamentary Assistant to Minister of Education included mandated to support the Minister in the evaluation of education infrastructure, chair and release the task force report "Building Financial Capacity for School Board Trustees and Superintendents", and to serve on the committee and contribute to the report "Inspiring Education-A Dialogue with Albertans."

In the 2012 Alberta general election Sarich received 42% of the vote firmly defeating the Wildrose, NDP and Liberal opponents. In the 2015 Alberta general election Sarich was defeated by NDP candidate Chris Nielsen, garnering 18% of the vote compared to Nielsen's 68%.

== Community involvement ==
Sarich's community volunteer contributions included: a business mentor with interVivos, Board of Director and chair, Speakers' Bureau with the Alberta Association of Former MLAs, and served as an advisory committee member to the Junior League of Edmonton and Catholic Social Services. Sarich served on Public Interest Alberta's Democracy Task Force, which examined potential areas of democratic reform in Alberta, and was one of the contributors to the publication "Democratic Renewal In Alberta Discussion Paper", and the John Humphrey Centre for Peace and Human Rights Symposium report, "A More Democratic Alberta: How Do We Get There?". While elected as a School Board Trustee, Sarich volunteered with Junior Achievement Northern Alberta & NWT to share her business knowledge and experience with junior high students. For more than ten years she served on numerous boards, committees, and published articles in the corporate health and wellness industry.

== Later life ==
Sarich endorsed Jason Kenney in the latter's successful run for leadership of the Progressive Conservative Party in 2017. She was subsequently appointed a public member of MacEwan University's Board of Governors in August 2019.

Sarich died on the night of February 26, 2021. She was 62, and had been diagnosed with cancer three weeks before her death. A tribute was made by Premier Kenney.

== Election results ==
=== 2008 general election ===
2008 Alberta general election results		Turnout 32.96%		Swing	
Affiliation	Candidate	Votes	%	Party	Personal
Progressive Conservative	Janice Sarich	4,577	45.71%	15.30%	
Liberal	Bill Bonko Sr.	3,895	38.89%	-5.95%	
New Democratic	Sidney Sadik	1,301	12.99%	-2.43%	
Green	Trey Capenhurst	241	2.41%	*	
Total		10,014			
Rejected, spoiled, and declined		66			
Eligible electors / Turnout		30,584	%		
Progressive Conservative gain from Liberal		Swing		10.63%	

=== 2012 general election ===
2012 Alberta general election: Edmonton-Decore
Party	Candidate	Votes	%	±%
Progressive Conservative	Janice Sarich	5,722	42.36%	-3.34%
Wildrose Alliance	Chris Bataluk	2,911	21.55%	–
New Democratic	Ali Haymour	2,721	20.15%	7.15%
Liberal	Ed Ammar	2,153	15.94%	-22.96%
Total		13,507	–	–
Rejected, spoiled and declined		99	62	4
Eligible electors / turnout		28,766	47.31%	12.91%
Progressive Conservative hold		Swing		7.00%
Source(s) Source: "32 - Edmonton-Decore, 2012 Alberta general election". officialresults.elections.ab.ca. Elections Alberta. Chief Electoral Officer (2012). The Report of the Chief Electoral Officer on the 2011 Provincial Enumeration and Monday, April 23, 2012 Provincial General Election of the Twenty-eighth Legislative Assembly (PDF) (Report). Edmonton, Alta.: Elections Alberta. Archived (PDF) from the original on May 6, 2021.

=== 2015 general election ===
2015 Alberta general election: Edmonton-Decore
Party	Candidate	Votes	%	±%
New Democratic	Chris Nielsen	10,531	67.91%	47.76%
Progressive Conservative	Janice Sarich	2,847	18.36%	-24.00%
Wildrose	Dean Miller	1,289	8.31%	-13.24%
Liberal	Bradley Whalen	691	4.46%	-11.48%
Green	Trey Capnerhurst	150	0.97%	–
Total		15,508	–	–
Rejected, spoiled and declined		47	37	21
Eligible electors / turnout		32,518	47.90%	0.59%
New Democratic gain from Progressive Conservative		Swing		14.37%
Source(s) Source: "32 - Edmonton-Decore, 2015 Alberta general election". officialresults.elections.ab.ca. Elections Alberta. Chief Electoral Officer (2016). 2015 General Election. A Report of the Chief Electoral Officer (PDF) (Report). Edmonton, Alta.: Elections Alberta.
