= Deron Bilous =

Canadian politician

The Honourable Deron Bilous ECA
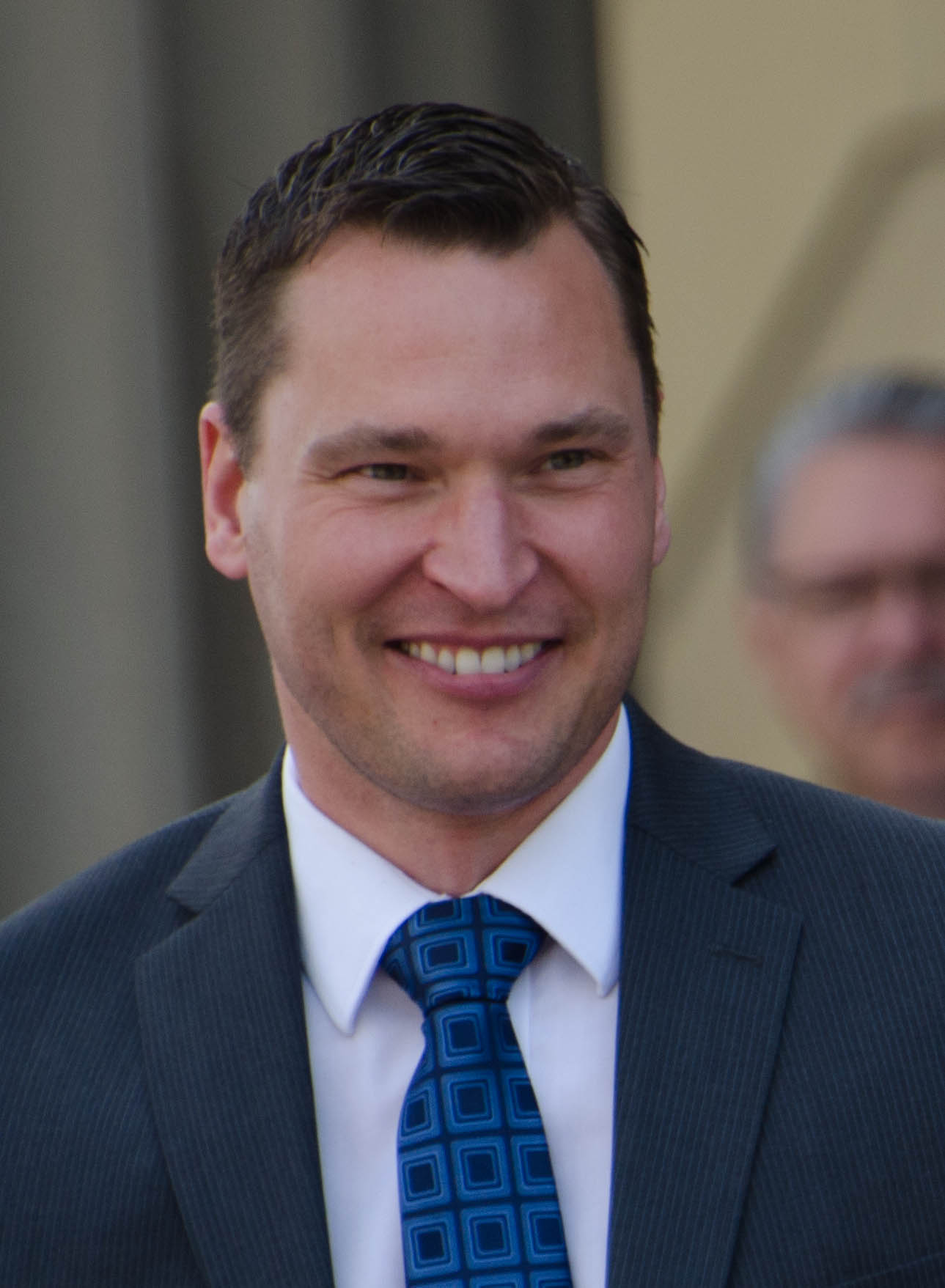
- Bilous in 2015

Minister of Economic Development and Trade of Alberta
- In office October 22, 2015 – April 30, 2019
- Premier: Rachel Notley
- Preceded by: Clint Dunford
- Succeeded by: Tanya Fir

Minister of Municipal Affairs
- In office May 24, 2015 – October 22, 2015
- Premier: Rachel Notley
- Preceded by: Diana McQueen
- Succeeded by: Danielle Larivee

Member of the Legislative Assembly of Alberta for Edmonton-Beverly-Clareview
- In office April 23, 2012 – May 29, 2023
- Preceded by: Tony Vandermeer
- Succeeded by: Peggy Wright

Personal details
- Born: October 7, 1975 (age 50) Edmonton, Alberta, Canada
- Party: New Democrat
- Education: University of Alberta
- Occupation: Teacher
- Portfolio: Minister of Economic Development and Trade

Deron Michael Bilous ECA (born October 7, 1975) is a Canadian politician, who served as a Member of the Legislative Assembly of Alberta, representing the riding of Edmonton-Beverly-Clareview, between 2012 and 2023. He was a member of the Alberta New Democratic Party caucus.

== Early life ==
Bilous was born and raised in Edmonton and is very proud of his Ukrainian ancestry. He graduated from the University of Alberta with a bachelor of education degree in 2001. For the past five years he has taught and mentored students at Edmonton's Inner City High School.

== Political career ==
Bilous was NDP candidate in Edmonton-Centre in the 2008 provincial election, losing to Laurie Blakeman.

He was elected when he tried again in the 2012 provincial election.

He was re-elected in the 2015 election, which saw the NDP win a majority government. Bilous was named to the cabinet as Minister of Municipal Affairs and the Minister in Charge of Service Alberta on May 24, 2015.

On October 22, 2015, his position in cabinet changed to Minister of Economic Development and Trade. He also was named Deputy Government House Leader.

On April 16, 2019, Bilous was re-elected for his third term in the Legislative Assembly, although his party lost enough seats to no longer be in government. He then served as the Official Opposition Critic for Economic Development and Innovation.

In August 2022, Bilous announced he would retire at the 2023 Alberta general election.

== Outside interests ==
An active volunteer in his community, Bilous has been a member of the Beverly Heights Community League and vice-president of the Boyle Street Community League. From 2008 to 2011 he served as a board member on the Edmonton Aboriginal Urban Affairs Committee.

Bilous participated in the Canada World Youth program in 1995–96, working in Edmonton, Saint-Jérôme, Quebec, and Tunisia.

== Electoral history ==
=== 2019 general election ===
2019 Alberta general election: Edmonton-Beverly-Clareview
| Party | Candidate | Votes | % | ±% |
|---|---|---|---|---|
| New Democratic | Deron Bilous | 8,834 | 50.63 | -23.17 |
| United Conservative | David Egan | 6,308 | 36.15 | +13.05 |
| Alberta Party | Jeff Walters | 1,283 | 7.35 | +6.45 |
| Liberal | Shadea Hussein | 494 | 2.83 | +0.63 |
| Alberta Independence | Paul A. Burts | 240 | 1.38 | – |
| Green | Michael Hunter | 206 | 1.18 | – |
| Independent | Andy Andrzej Gudanowski | 84 | 0.48 | – |
| Total | | 17,449 | 99.38 | – |
| Rejected, spoiled and declined | | 109 | 0.62 | -0.27 |
| Turnout | | 17,558 | 56.26 | +9.61 |
| Eligible electors | | 31,211 | | |
| New Democratic hold | | Swing | | -18.11 |
Source(s) Source: "27 - Edmonton-Beverly-Clareview, 2019 Alberta general election". officialresults.elections.ab.ca. Elections Alberta. Alberta. Chief Electoral Officer (2019). 2019 General Election. A Report of the Chief Electoral Officer. Volume II (PDF) (Report). Vol. 2. Edmonton, Alta.: Elections Alberta. ISBN 978-1-988620-12-1.

=== 2015 general election ===
2015 Alberta general election: Edmonton-Beverly-Clareview
| Party | Candidate | Votes | % | ±% |
|---|---|---|---|---|
| New Democratic | Deron Bilous | 12,049 | 73.80% | 36.83% |
| Progressive Conservative | Tony Caterina | 2,524 | 15.46% | -19.79% |
| Wildrose | Stephanie Diacon | 1,248 | 7.64% | -12.79% |
| Liberal | Tomi Yellowface | 359 | 2.20% | -4.09% |
| Alberta Party | Owais Siddiqui | 147 | 0.90% | – |
| Total | | 16,327 | – | – |
| Rejected, spoiled and declined | | 54 | 74 | 19 |
| Eligible electors / turnout | | 35,318 | 46.44% | -0.24% |
| New Democratic hold | | Swing | | 28.31% |
Source(s) Source: "28 - Edmonton-Beverly-Clareview, 2015 Alberta general election". officialresults.elections.ab.ca. Elections Alberta. Chief Electoral Officer (2016). 2015 General Election. A Report of the Chief Electoral Officer (PDF) (Report). Edmonton, Alta.: Elections Alberta.

=== 2012 general election ===
2012 Alberta general election: Edmonton-Beverly-Clareview
| Party | Candidate | Votes | % | ±% |
|---|---|---|---|---|
| New Democratic | Deron Bilous | 5,264 | 36.97% | 0.53% |
| Progressive Conservative | Tony Vandermeer | 5,019 | 35.25% | -4.38% |
| Wildrose Alliance | Don Martin | 2,909 | 20.43% | 17.69% |
| Liberal | Chris Heward | 895 | 6.29% | -12.63% |
| Evergreen | Trey Capnerhurst | 151 | 1.06% | -0.67% |
| Total | | 14,238 | – | – |
| Rejected, spoiled and declined | | 39 | 63 | 11 |
| Eligible electors / turnout | | 30,610 | 46.68% | 8.99% |
| New Democratic gain from Progressive Conservative | | Swing | | -0.74% |
Source(s) Source: "28 - Edmonton-Beverly-Clareview, 2012 Alberta general election". officialresults.elections.ab.ca. Elections Alberta. Chief Electoral Officer (2012). The Report of the Chief Electoral Officer on the 2011 Provincial Enumeration and Monday, April 23, 2012 Provincial General Election of the Twenty-eighth Legislative Assembly (PDF) (Report). Edmonton, Alta.: Elections Alberta. Archived (PDF) from the original on 6 May 2021.

=== 2008 general election ===
2008 Alberta general election: Edmonton-Centre
| Party | Candidate | Votes | % | ±% |
|---|---|---|---|---|
| Liberal | Laurie Blakeman | 5,042 | 44.98% | -12.09% |
| Progressive Conservative | Bill Donahue | 3,291 | 29.36% | 5.23% |
| New Democratic | Deron Bilous | 2,163 | 19.30% | 7.16% |
| Green | David J. Parker | 472 | 4.21% | – |
| Wildrose Alliance | James Iverson | 200 | 1.78% | – |
| Alberta Party | Margaret Saunter | 42 | 0.37% | – |
| Total | | 11,210 | – | – |
| Rejected, spoiled and declined | | 78 | – | – |
| Eligible electors / turnout | | 30,335 | 37.21% | -11.76% |
| Liberal hold | | Swing | | -8.66% |
Source(s) Source: "Elections Alberta 2008 General Election". Elections Alberta.
