= Chris Nielsen (politician) =

Canadian politician (born 1967)

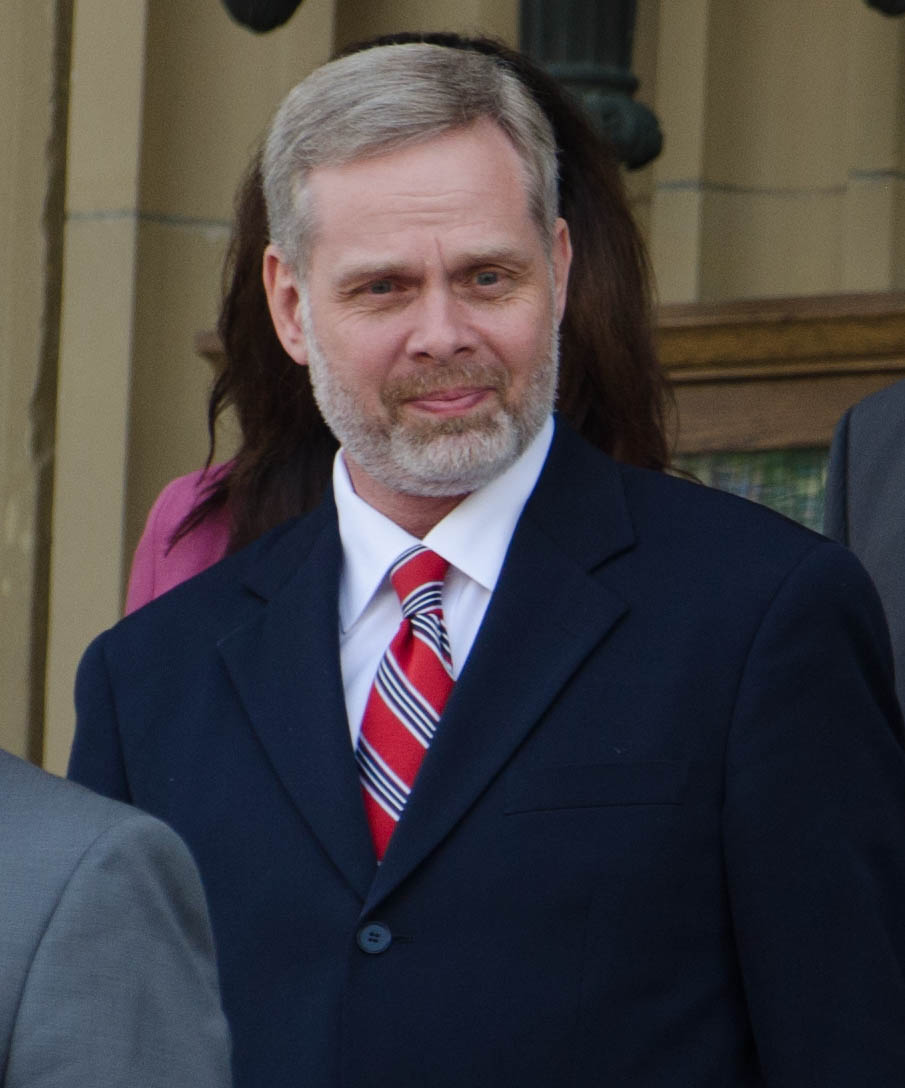
- Nielsen in May 2015

Member of the Legislative Assembly of Alberta for Edmonton-Decore
- In office May 5, 2015 – May 29, 2023
- Preceded by: Janice Sarich
- Succeeded by: Sharif Haji

Personal details
- Born: April 1967 (age 59) Winnipeg, Manitoba
- Party: Alberta New Democratic Party
- Occupation: Shipper, Warehouseman

Christian Nielsen (born 1967) is a Canadian politician who was the Member of the Legislative Assembly of Alberta for the riding of Edmonton-Decore. He was elected in the 2015 Alberta election with 68% of the popular vote. Within the Legislature, Nielsen was on a number of standing committees, such as the Standing Committee on Resource Stewardship. He was previously the deputy chair of the Standing Committee on the Alberta Heritage Savings Trust Fund, a committee devoted to oversight of Alberta's "rainy day" fund, built from past natural resource revenue.

== Background ==
Nielsen was born in Winnipeg, Manitoba in 1967, before moving to Edmonton in 1982 with his family. He was educated at Northern Alberta Institute of Technology (NAIT), where he attended from 1986 to 1988. After his education, Nielsen held jobs in the industrial sector, and was a shipping receiver at a Lucerne Foods ice cream plant prior to being elected as an MLA.

== Electoral history ==
=== 2019 general election ===
2019 Alberta general election: Edmonton-Decore
Party	Candidate	Votes	%	±%
New Democratic	Chris Nielsen	8,789	47.54	-21.17
United Conservative	Karen Principe	7,371	39.87	+13.89
Alberta Party	Ali Haymour	2,027	10.96	–
Alberta Independence	Virginia Bruneau	301	1.63	–
Total		18,488	98.79	–
Rejected, spoiled and declined		227	1.21	
Turnout		18,715	56.68	
Eligible electors		33,017		
New Democratic hold		Swing		-17.53
Source(s) Source: "30 - Edmonton-Decore, 2019 Alberta general election". officialresults.elections.ab.ca. Elections Alberta. Alberta. Chief Electoral Officer (2019). 2019 General Election. A Report of the Chief Electoral Officer. Volume II (PDF) (Report). Vol. 2. Edmonton, Alta.: Elections Alberta. pp. 116–119. ISBN 978-1-988620-12-1.

=== 2015 general election ===
2015 Alberta general election: Edmonton-Decore
Party	Candidate	Votes	%	±%
New Democratic	Chris Nielsen	10,531	67.91%	47.76%
Progressive Conservative	Janice Sarich	2,847	18.36%	-24.00%
Wildrose	Dean Miller	1,289	8.31%	-13.24%
Liberal	Bradley Whalen	691	4.46%	-11.48%
Green	Trey Capnerhurst	150	0.97%	–
Total		15,508	–	–
Rejected, spoiled and declined		47	37	21
Eligible electors / turnout		32,518	47.90%	0.59%
New Democratic gain from Progressive Conservative		Swing		14.37%
Source(s) Source: "32 - Edmonton-Decore, 2015 Alberta general election". officialresults.elections.ab.ca. Elections Alberta. Chief Electoral Officer (2016). 2015 General Election. A Report of the Chief Electoral Officer (PDF) (Report). Edmonton, Alta.: Elections Alberta.
