= Peter Sekulic =

Canadian politician

Member of the Legislative Assembly of Alberta
- In office 1993–1997
- Succeeded by: Ed Gibbons
- Constituency: Edmonton Manning

Personal details
- Born: 1962 (age 63–64) Lovinac, Croatia
- Party: Alberta Liberal Party
- Education: University of Alberta
- Occupation: social worker

Peter Sekulic (born 1962) is a former Canadian politician in the province of Alberta.

Sekulic was born in Croatia in 1962 and immigrated with his parents and a sibling to Canada in 1967. He was elected to the Legislative Assembly of Alberta in the 1993 Alberta general election. Peter defeated former Edmonton Belmont incumbent New Democrat Tom Sigurdson to pick up the new district of Edmonton Manning for the Alberta Liberal Party.

Sekulic served a single term in the legislature. He was the Deputy Native Affairs Critic for the Liberal opposition.

Sekulic currently works for Strategic Relations Inc. with former MLA Jon Havelock.
