= Tony Vandermeer =

Canadian politician

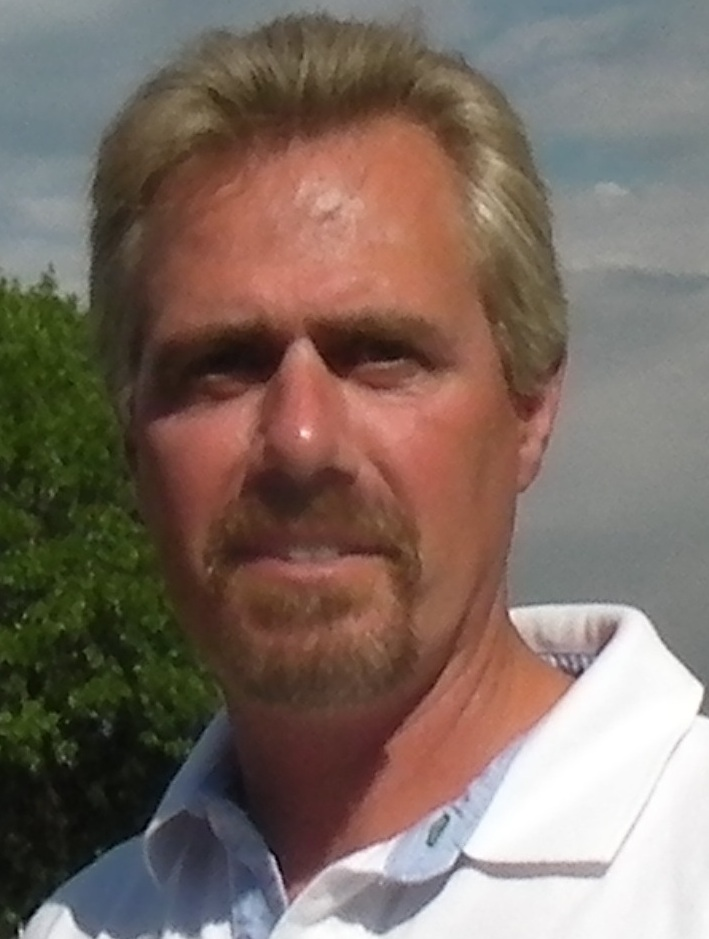

MLA for Edmonton Manning
- In office 2001–2004
- Preceded by: Ed Gibbons
- Succeeded by: Dan Backs

MLA for Edmonton-Beverly-Clareview
- In office 2008–2012
- Preceded by: Ray Martin
- Succeeded by: Deron Bilous

Personal details
- Born: October 8, 1962 (age 63) Edmonton, Alberta
- Party: Progressive Conservative

Thomas Wilfred "Tony" Vandermeer (born October 8, 1962) is a politician from Alberta, Canada, who was a member of the Legislative Assembly of Alberta from 2001 to 2004 and from 2008 to 2012. Vandermeer first ran for the Progressive Conservatives in the 1997 Alberta general election when he lost to Liberal Ed Gibbons. He ran against Gibbons again in the 2001 Alberta general election, this time defeating him by a thin margin.

Vandermeer was defeated after serving only one term in the 2004 Alberta general election in a very tight race against Liberal Dan Backs. He returned to the legislature in the 2008 Alberta election, this time representing the riding of Edmonton-Beverly-Clareview, by defeating incumbent New Democrat Ray Martin.

The 2012 election resulted in another close loss, this time to NDP candidate Deron Bilous by under 300 votes.

== Electoral history ==
=== 2008 Alberta general election ===
2008 Alberta general election results		Turnout 34.54%		Swing	
Affiliation	Candidate	Votes	%	Party	Personal
Progressive Conservative	Tony Vandermeer	4,182	39.63%	10.24%	
New Democratic	Ray Martin	3,845	36.44%	-14.39%	
Liberal	Dawit Isaac	1,996	18.92%	7.67%	
Wildrose Alliance	Brian Dell	289	2.74%	-1.69%	
Green	Frederick Pivot	183	1.73%	0.37%	*
Social Credit	Robin Porteous	57	0.54%	-2.20%	
Total		10,552	100%		
Rejected, Spoiled and Declined		44			
30,676 eligible electors
Progressive Conservative gain from New Democratic		Swing		24.63%	

=== 2012 Alberta general election ===
2012 Alberta general election: Edmonton-Beverly-Clareview
Party	Candidate	Votes	%	±%
New Democratic	Deron Bilous	5,264	36.97%	0.53%
Progressive Conservative	Tony Vandermeer	5,019	35.25%	-4.38%
Wildrose Alliance	Don Martin	2,909	20.43%	17.69%
Liberal	Chris Heward	895	6.29%	-12.63%
Evergreen	Trey Capnerhurst	151	1.06%	-0.67%
Total		14,238	–	–
Rejected, spoiled and declined		39	63	11
Eligible electors / turnout		30,610	46.68%	8.99%
New Democratic gain from Progressive Conservative		Swing		-0.74%
Source(s) Source: "28 - Edmonton-Beverly-Clareview, 2012 Alberta general election". officialresults.elections.ab.ca. Elections Alberta. Chief Electoral Officer (2012). The Report of the Chief Electoral Officer on the 2011 Provincial Enumeration and Monday, April 23, 2012 Provincial General Election of the Twenty-eighth Legislative Assembly (PDF) (Report). Edmonton, Alta.: Elections Alberta. Archived (PDF) from the original on May 6, 2021.
