= Peggy Wright =

Canadian politician from Alberta

Peggy Wright MLA

Member of Legislative Assembly of Alberta for Edmonton-Beverly-Clareview
- Incumbent
- Assumed office May 29, 2023
- Preceded by: Deron Bilous

Personal details
- Party: New Democratic
- Occupation: Teacher

Peggy Wright is a Canadian politician from the Alberta New Democratic Party who was elected as a Member of the Legislative Assembly of Alberta for Edmonton-Beverly-Clareview in the 2023 Alberta general election. As of June 21, 2024, she serves as the Official Opposition critic for Labour and as the Deputy Chair of the Official Opposition caucus.

She was the party's provincial president of the youth wing. Wright has worked as a teacher for more than 20 years and prior to her election to the Legislature worked as an assistant principal.

== Personal life ==
Her father Keith Wright was the CCF candidate in Strathcona Centre in the 1959 provincial election and was elected president of the national NDP youth wing in 1961. Wright's mother, Kathleen Wright, was a longtime NDP activist who stood as a provincial candidate in Edmonton-Gold Bar in 1979 and Edmonton-Avonmore in 1982.

== Electoral history ==
2023 Alberta general election: Edmonton-Beverly-Clareview
| Party | Candidate | Votes | % | ±% |
|---|---|---|---|---|
| New Democratic | Peggy Wright | 8,510 | 57.66 | +7.03 |
| United Conservative | Luke Suvanto | 5,690 | 38.55 | +2.40 |
| Green | Michael Hunter | 337 | 2.28 | +1.10 |
| Independent | Andrzej (Andy) Gudanowski | 222 | 1.50 | +1.02 |
| Total | | 14,759 | 99.31 | – |
| Rejected and declined | | 102 | 0.69 | |
| Turnout | | 14,861 | 48.99 | |
| Eligible voters | | 30,336 | | |
| New Democratic hold | | Swing | | +2.32 |
Source(s) Source: Elections Alberta
