= Ray Martin (politician) =

Canadian politician (born 1941)

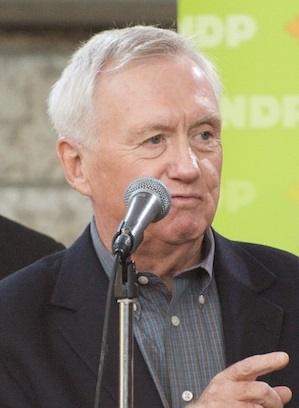

Leader of the Official Opposition in Alberta
- In office November 6, 1984 – June 14, 1993
- Preceded by: Grant Notley
- Succeeded by: Laurence Decore

Leader of the Alberta New Democratic Party
- In office November 10, 1984 – February 5, 1994
- Preceded by: Grant Notley
- Succeeded by: Ross Harvey

MLA for Edmonton-Norwood
- In office 1982–1993
- Preceded by: Catherine Chichak
- Succeeded by: Andrew Beniuk

MLA for Edmonton-Beverly-Clareview
- In office 2004–2008
- Preceded by: Julius Yankowsky
- Succeeded by: Tony Vandermeer

Edmonton Public School Trustee for Ward D
- In office 2013–2017
- Preceded by: David Colburn
- Succeeded by: Trisha Estabrooks
- In office 2001–2004
- Preceded by: Terry Sulyma
- Succeeded by: David Colburn

Personal details
- Born: Raymond James Martin; August 8, 1941 (age 85) Delia, Alberta, Canada
- Party: Alberta New Democratic
- Other political affiliations: New Democratic Party
- Education: University of Alberta; University of Calgary
- Occupation: Teacher

Raymond James Martin (born August 8, 1941) is a Canadian politician in Alberta who was a member of the Legislative Assembly of Alberta from 1982 to 1993 and from 2004 to 2008.

Martin served four terms as an Alberta MLA and two terms as an Edmonton Public School Board Trustee. In 2018, Martin published his memoir, Made in Alberta: The Ray Martin Story.

== Early life ==
Born in 1941 in Delia, Alberta, Martin attended the University of Alberta in Edmonton. He was a member of Kappa Sigma fraternity. He later attended the University of Calgary in order to earn his master's degree.

He taught in Edmonton public schools.

== Provincial politics ==
Martin ran for a seat in the 1975 Alberta general election in Calgary and in 1979 in Edmonton-Norwood but both times was unsuccessful.

Martin ran again in Edmonton-Norwood in 1982 provincial election. This time he was elected to the Legislative Assembly of Alberta to join Grant Notley in a two-member Alberta New Democratic Party (NDP) caucus. At the time, the two NDP-ers and two Independent members were the only opposition MLAs in the Legislature, sitting in opposition to more than 70 Conservative MLAs. Martin was the first NDP MLA elected in Edmonton since the end of the use of single transferable voting in Edmonton back in 1956.

He became leader of the Alberta NDP in 1984, succeeding Grant Notley after his death in a plane crash.

Martin led the party to a highwater mark (at the time) winning 16 seats in the 1986 provincial election, making him leader of the opposition in the legislature. Still under Ray's leadership, the NDP took that same number of seats in the 1989 election.

In 1993, none of the party's sitting MLAs were re-elected. Martin was defeated in his constituency, Edmonton-Norwood, by Liberal Andrew Beniuk.

He quit the party's leadership in 1994, being replaced by former NDP MP Ross Harvey.

After an absence of eleven years, Martin returned to the Legislature as the NDP Member of the Legislative Assembly (MLA) for Edmonton-Beverly-Clareview in the 2004 general election.

He was defeated in 2008 by Progressive Conservative Tony Vandermeer.

Martin ran again for the NDP in the 2012 provincial election, in the riding of Edmonton-Glenora. He was defeated by Progressive Conservative Heather Klimchuk.

== Municipal politics ==
In the 2001 Edmonton municipal election, Martin won election as the Edmonton Public School Board Trustee for Ward D. He did not seek re-election to this role in the 2004 election.

In the 2013 Edmonton municipal election, Martin once again won election as the Edmonton Public School Board Trustee for Ward D. He did not seek re-election in the 2017 election.

== Federal politics ==
In 2003, Martin supported Bill Blaikie's unsuccessful campaign to become leader of the federal New Democratic Party.

Ray Martin has run and lost in four federal elections, each time as an NDP candidate. He ran in the 1997, 2000, 2008, and 2011 federal elections, in Edmonton North, Edmonton Centre-East, and Edmonton East (twice), respectively.

== Electoral record ==
=== Provincial ===
1979 Alberta general election: Edmonton-Norwood
Party	Candidate	Votes	%	±%
Progressive Conservative	Catherine Chichak	3,950	47.15%	-12.22%
New Democratic	Ray Martin	3,194	38.12%	12.58%
Social Credit	Mike Ekelund	703	8.39%	-6.04%
Liberal	Walter G. Coombs	486	5.80%	–
Communist	Kimball Cariou	45	0.54%	-0.13%
Total		8,378	–	–
Rejected, spoiled and declined		97	–	–
Eligible electors / turnout		16,231	52.21%	5.41%
Progressive Conservative hold		Swing		-12.40%
Source(s) Source: "Edmonton-Norwood Official Results 1979 Alberta general election". Alberta Heritage Community Foundation.

1982 Alberta general election: Edmonton-Norwood
Party	Candidate	Votes	%	±%
New Democratic	Ray Martin	4,857	46.22%	8.10%
Progressive Conservative	Tony Falcone	4,782	45.51%	-1.64%
Western Canada Concept	John Hudson	569	5.41%	–
Independent	Georg J.P. Wowk	263	2.50%	–
Communist	David Wallis	37	0.35%	-0.19%
Total		10,508	–	–
Rejected, spoiled and declined		59	–	–
Eligible electors / turnout		17,050	61.98%	9.85%
New Democratic gain from Progressive Conservative		Swing		-4.15%
Source(s) Source: "Edmonton-Norwood Official Results 1982 Alberta general election". Alberta Heritage Community Foundation.

1986 Alberta general election: Edmonton-Norwood
Party	Candidate	Votes	%	±%
New Democratic	Ray Martin	5,272	69.62%	23.39%
Progressive Conservative	Catherine Chichak	1,942	25.64%	-19.86%
Liberal	David R. Long	359	4.74%	–
Total		7,573	–	–
Rejected, spoiled and declined		26	–	–
Eligible electors / turnout		15,632	48.61%	-13.36%
New Democratic hold		Swing		21.63%
Source(s) Source: "Edmonton-Norwood Official Results 1986 Alberta general election". Alberta Heritage Community Foundation.

1989 Alberta general election: Edmonton-Norwood
Party	Candidate	Votes	%	±%
New Democratic	Ray Martin	4,229	57.60%	-12.02%
Liberal	Luis C. Baptista	1,594	21.71%	16.97%
Progressive Conservative	Dan Papirnik	1,519	20.69%	-4.95%
Total		7,342	–	–
Rejected, spoiled and declined		16	–	–
Eligible electors / turnout		15,068	48.83%	0.22%
New Democratic hold		Swing		-4.04%
Source(s) Source: "Edmonton-Norwood Official Results 1989 Alberta general election". Alberta Heritage Community Foundation.

1993 Alberta general election: Edmonton-Norwood
Party	Candidate	Votes	%	±%
Liberal	Andrew Beniuk	4,944	42.76%	21.05%
New Democratic	Ray Martin	3,749	32.43%	-25.17%
Progressive Conservative	Fay Orr	2,517	21.77%	1.08%
Social Credit	Alan Cruikshank	264	2.28%	–
Natural Law	Maury Shapka	88	0.76%	–
Total		11,562	–	–
Rejected, spoiled, and declined		49	–	–
Eligible electors / turnout		22,844	50.83%	2.00%
Liberal gain from New Democratic		Swing		-12.78%
Source(s) Source: "Edmonton-Norwood Official Results 1993 Alberta general election". Alberta Heritage Community Foundation.

2004 Alberta general election: Edmonton-Beverly-Clareview
Party	Candidate	Votes	%	±%
New Democratic	Ray Martin	5,259	50.83%	31.68%
Progressive Conservative	Julius E. Yankowsky	3,041	29.39%	-16.26%
Liberal	Sam Parmar	1,164	11.25%	-20.49%
Alberta Alliance	Philip Gamache	458	4.43%	–
Social Credit	Ken Shipka	283	2.74%	–
Green	Benoit Couture	141	1.36%	–
Total		10,346	–	–
Rejected, spoiled and declined		35	53	1
Eligible electors / Turnout		23,569	44.05%	-4.68%
New Democratic gain from Progressive Conservative		Swing		3.76%
Source(s) Source: "00 - Edmonton-Beverly-Clareview, 2004 Alberta general election". officialresults.elections.ab.ca. Elections Alberta. Alberta. Chief Electoral Officer (2005). Report of the Chief Electoral Officer on the General Enumeration and General Election of the Twenty-sixth Legislative Assembly (Report). Edmonton: Alberta Legislative Assembly, Office of the Chief Electoral Officer.

2008 Alberta general election: Edmonton-Beverly-Clareview
Party	Candidate	Votes	%	±%
Progressive Conservative	Tony Vandermeer	4,182	39.63%	10.24%
New Democratic	Ray Martin	3,845	36.44%	-14.39%
Liberal	Dawit Isaac	1,996	18.92%	7.67%
Wildrose Alliance	Brian Dell	289	2.74%	-1.69%
Green	Frédérique Pivot	183	1.73%	0.37%
Social Credit	Robin Porteous	57	0.54%	-2.20%
Total		10,552	–	–
Rejected, spoiled and declined		20	21	3
Eligible electors / Turnout		28,057	37.69%	-6.36%
Progressive Conservative gain from New Democratic		Swing		-9.12%
Source(s) Source: "25 - Edmonton-Beverly-Clareview, 2008 Alberta general election". officialresults.elections.ab.ca. Elections Alberta. Chief Electoral Officer (2008). The Report on the March 3, 2008 Provincial General Election of the Twenty-Seventh Legislative Assembly (Report). Edmonton, Alta.: Elections Alberta.

2012 Alberta general election: Edmonton-Glenora
Party	Candidate	Votes	%	±%
Progressive Conservative	Heather Klimchuk	6,183	38.24%	-1.66%
New Democratic	Ray Martin	4,143	25.62%	10.52%
Wildrose Alliance	Don Koziak	2,732	16.90%	14.51%
Liberal	Bruce Miller	1,670	10.33%	-28.74%
Alberta Party	Sue Huff	1,441	8.91%	–
Total		16,169	–	–
Rejected, spoiled and declined		119	55	6
Eligible electors / turnout		29,262	55.68%	13.23%
Progressive Conservative hold		Swing		5.89%
Source(s) Source: "34 - Edmonton-Glenora, 2012 Alberta general election". officialresults.elections.ab.ca. Elections Alberta.

=== Federal ===
1997 Canadian federal election: Edmonton North
Party	Candidate	Votes	%	±	Expenditures
Reform	Deborah Grey	16,124	44.30%		$56,921
Liberal	Jonathan Murphy	11,820	32.47%		$46,517
New Democratic Party	Ray Martin	5,413	14.87%		$60,286
Progressive Conservative	Mitch Panciuk	2,811	7.72%		$51,169
Natural Law	Ric Johnsen	226	0.62%		
Total valid votes		36,394	100.00%		
Total rejected ballots		99	0.27%		
Turnout		36,493	55.63%		

2000 Canadian federal election: Edmonton Centre-East
Party	Candidate	Votes	%	±%	Expenditures
Alliance	Peter Goldring	17,768	42.43	-2.14	$58,345
Liberal	Sue Olsen	14,323	34.20	-0.38	$57,858
New Democratic	Ray Martin	7,304	17.44	+5.65	$56,287
Progressive Conservative	Kevin Mahfouz	2,252	5.37	-1.93	$1,688
Communist	Naomi Rankin	222	0.53	–	$238
Total valid votes		41,869	100.00		–
Total rejected ballots		156	0.37	+0.15	
Turnout		42,025	53.42	+1.73	

2008 Canadian federal election: Edmonton East
Party	Candidate	Votes	%	±%	Expenditures
Conservative	Peter Goldring	21,487	51.31	+1.18	$72,687
New Democratic	Ray Martin	13,318	31.80	+13.33	$27,417
Liberal	Stephanie Laskoski	4,578	10.93	-15.23	$9,666
Green	Trey Capnerhurst	2,488	5.94	+0.70	$752
Total valid votes/Expense limit		41,871	100.00		$92,946
Total rejected ballots		151	0.36	-0.01	
Turnout		42,022	45.43	-9.9	

2011 Canadian federal election: Edmonton East
Party	Candidate	Votes	%	±%	Expenditures
Conservative	Peter Goldring	24,111	52.75	+1.44	$74,313
New Democratic	Ray Martin	17,078	37.36	+5.56	$55,462
Liberal	Shafik Ruda	3,176	6.95	-3.98	$17,634
Green	Trey Capnerhurst	1,345	2.94	-3.00	$2,546
Total valid votes/Expense limit		45,710	100.00		$95,270
Total rejected ballots		194	0.42	+0.06	
Turnout		45,904	50.27	+4.84	
Eligible voters		91,321	–	–	

Legislative Assembly of Alberta
Preceded by Catherine Chichak	MLA Edmonton-Norwood; 1982-1993	Succeeded by Andrew Beniuk
Preceded by Grant Notley	Leader of the Official Opposition in Alberta; 1985-1993	Succeeded by Laurence Decore
Preceded by Julius Yankowsky	MLA Edmonton Beverly-Clareview; 2004-2008	Succeeded by Tony Vandermeer
