= Edmonton-North West (provincial electoral district) =

Provincial electoral district in Alberta, Canada

Alberta electoral district
- Edmonton-North West within the City of Edmonton (2017 boundaries)

Provincial electoral district
- Legislature: Legislative Assembly of Alberta
MLA
David Eggen
New Democratic
- District created: 1957
- District abolished: 1971
- District re-created: 2019
- First contested: 1959, 2019
- Last contested: 1967, 2023

Demographics
- Population (2016): 45,523
- Area (km²): 29.9
- Pop. density (per km²): 1,522.5

Edmonton-North West is a provincial electoral district in Alberta, Canada that has existed twice, first as Edmonton North West between 1959 and 1971, and for a second time since 2019. The district is one of 87 districts mandated to return a single member (MLA) to the Legislative Assembly of Alberta using the first past the post method of voting.

== Geography ==
The district is located in northwest Edmonton, containing the neighbourhoods of Lauderdale, Rosslyn, Kensington, Griesbach, Carlisle, Caernarvon, Baranow, Hudson, Cumberland, Oxford, Carlton, and The Palisades, as well as the area west of 142 St NW and north of 137 Ave NW to the border with St. Albert.

== History ==
=== Boundary history ===
The district was created as Edmonton North West in the 1959 redistribution which broke up the mega-ridings of Edmonton and Calgary, creating a number of single-member districts in their place. It was replaced with Edmonton-Calder in 1971, but re-created from the same riding in 2017 when the Electoral Boundaries Commission recommended moving the Calder neighbourhood (among others) out of the riding. The district also gained three neighbourhoods from Edmonton-Castle Downs.

=== Representation history ===
Members for Edmonton-North West
Assembly	Years	Member	Party
See Edmonton 1921–1959
14th	1959–1963	Edgar Gerhart	Social Credit
15th	1963–1967	Edgar Gerhart	Social Credit
16th	1967–1971	Edgar Gerhart	Social Credit
See Edmonton-Calder 1971–1993 and 1997–2019
30th	2019–2023	David Eggen	New Democrat
31st	2023–	David Eggen	New Democrat

The district was represented from 1959 to 1971 by Edgar Gerhart of the Alberta Social Credit Party, who had already served as one of several MLAs for Edmonton before it was split. He served as Minister of Municipal Affairs under premier Ernest Manning for his final term, and briefly as Attorney General as well under Harry Strom. Gerhart was defeated in Edmonton-Calder in the 1971 election.

== Electoral results ==
=== Elections in the 1950s ===
1959 Alberta general election
Party	Candidate	Votes	%
Social Credit	Edgar Gerhart	4,823	42.72
Progressive Conservative	Ned Feehan	3,249	28.78
Liberal	Harper McCrae	2,071	18.35
Co-operative Commonwealth	James Forest	1,146	10.15
Total valid votes		11,289	99.79
Rejected, spoiled and declined		24	0.21
Registered electors / Turnout		19,258	58.74
Social Credit pickup new district.			
Source(s) Alberta Heritage Foundation. "Election results for Edmonton-North West". Archived from the original on December 8, 2010.

=== Elections in the 1960s ===
1963 Alberta general election
Party	Candidate	Votes	%	±%
Social Credit	Edgar Gerhart	4,369	46.03	+3.31
Progressive Conservative	Ned Feehan	1,878	19.79	-8.99
Liberal	Edmund H. Leger	1,854	19.53	+1.18
New Democratic	Grant Notley	1,391	14.65	+4.50
Total valid votes		9,492	99.87	+0.08
Rejected, spoiled and declined		12	0.13	-0.08
Registered electors / Turnout		19,695	48.26	-10.48
Social Credit hold		Swing		+6.15
Source(s) Alberta Heritage Foundation. "Election results for Edmonton-North West". Archived from the original on December 8, 2010.

1967 Alberta general election
Party	Candidate	Votes	%	±%
Social Credit	Edgar Gerhart	4,674	36.22	-9.81
Progressive Conservative	Paul Norris	4,205	32.59	+12.80
New Democratic	Dave Belland	2,664	20.64	+5.99
Liberal	Thomas Leia	1,173	9.09	-10.44
Independent	Oscar A. Green	188	1.46	–
Total valid votes		12,904	99.68	-0.19
Rejected, spoiled and declined		42	0.32	+0.19
Registered electors / Turnout		20,533	63.05	+14.79
Social Credit hold		Swing		-11.31
Source(s) Alberta Heritage Foundation. "Election results for Edmonton-North West".

=== Elections in the 2010s ===
Redistributed results, 2015 Alberta general election
Party	Votes	%
New Democratic	10,315	69.13%
Progressive Conservative	2,865	19.20%
Wildrose	1,241	8.32%
Liberal	501	3.36%

2019 Alberta general election
Party	Candidate	Votes	%	±%
New Democratic	David Eggen	9,669	51.74%	-17.39%
United Conservative	Ali Eltayeb	6,587	35.25%	7.73%
Alberta Party	Judy Kim-Meneen	1,871	10.01%	–
Liberal	Brandon Teixeira	276	1.48%	-1.88%
Alberta Independence	Tim Shanks	149	0.80%	–
Alberta Advantage	Luke Burns	136	0.73%	–
Total		18,688	–	–
Rejected, spoiled and declined		80	74	23
Eligible electors / turnout		30,639	61.33%	N/A
Source(s) Source: "39 - Edmonton-North West, 2019 Alberta general election". officialresults.elections.ab.ca. Elections Alberta. Alberta. Chief Electoral Officer (2019). 2019 General Election. A Report of the Chief Electoral Officer. Volume II (PDF) (Report). Vol. 2. Edmonton, Alta.: Elections Alberta. pp. 152–155. ISBN 978-1-988620-12-1.

=== 2023 ===
2023 Alberta general election
Party	Candidate	Votes	%	±%
New Democratic	David Eggen	9,978	59.74	+8.01
United Conservative	Ali Haymour	6,388	38.25	+3.00
Green	Tyler Beaulac	335	2.01	–
Total		16,701	99.14	–
Rejected and declined		145	0.86	
Turnout		16,846	51.98	
Eligible voters		32,407		
New Democratic hold		Swing		+2.50
Source(s) Source: Elections Alberta

== See also ==
- List of Alberta provincial electoral districts
- Canadian provincial electoral districts
