= Paproski =

Paproski is a surname. Notable people with the surname include:

- Carl Paproski (1945–2008), Canadian politician
- Kenneth Paproski (1931–2007), Canadian politician
- Steve Paproski (1928–1993), Canadian politician and football player

== See also ==
- Paprocki
