= Pembina, Edmonton =

Pembina
- Neighbourhood
- Location of Pembina in Edmonton
- Coordinates: 53.600°N 113.552°W
- Country: Canada
- Province: Alberta
- City: Edmonton
- Quadrant: NW
- Ward: Anirniq
- Sector: North
- Area: The Palisades

Government
  - Administrative body: Edmonton City Council
  - Councillor: Erin Rutherford

Area
  - Total: 0.68 km^{2} (0.26 sq mi)
- Elevation: 684 m (2,244 ft)

Population (2012)
  - Total: 506
  - Density: 744.1/km^{2} (1,927/sq mi)
  - Change (2009–12): ▲11.5%
  - Dwellings: 295

Pembina is a primarily commercial neighbourhood in north west Edmonton, Alberta, Canada with residences in one walk up apartment complex and one townhouse complex.

It is roughly a wide, flattened U-shaped neighbourhood with the neighbourhood of Hudson within the arms of the "U". The base of the "U" runs parallel to 137 Avenue. The west side of the neighbourhood is bounded by 142 Street, and the east side by 127 Street. It is surrounded by a mixture of residential neighbourhoods and industrial subdivisions. To the north is the residential neighbourhood of Cumberland, to the east and north east is the residential neighbourhood of Baranow, to the south east is the residential neighbourhood of Kensington, and to the south is the residential neighbourhood of Wellington. Located to the south west is the industrial subdivision of McArthur Industrial, and to the west and north west is the industrial subdivision of Rampart Industrial.

== Demographics ==
In the City of Edmonton's 2014 municipal census, Pembina had a population of 542 living in 299 dwellings, a 7.1% increase from its 2012 population of 506. With a land area of 0.68 km^{2} (0.26 sq mi), it had a population density of 744.1 people/km^{2} in 2012.

The size of the average household is 3.3, with three out of five households having four to five persons.

== Residential development ==
All residential dwellings are two complexes, a walk up apartment complex and a townhouse complex across from each other on 140 Avenue between 129 and 130 streets. The two complexes were built during the mid to late 1990s. Roughly 33% of occupied residences are rented, with 67% owner occupied.
