= Hudson, Edmonton =

Hudson
- Neighbourhood
- Location of Hudson in Edmonton
- Coordinates: 53.605°N 113.548°W
- Country: Canada
- Province: Alberta
- City: Edmonton
- Quadrant: NW
- Ward: Anirniq
- Sector: North
- Area: The Palisades

Government
  - Administrative body: Edmonton City Council
  - Councillor: Erin Rutherford

Area
  - Total: 0.57 km^{2} (0.22 sq mi)
- Elevation: 684 m (2,244 ft)

Population (2012)
  - Total: 2,020
  - Density: 3,543.9/km^{2} (9,179/sq mi)
  - Change (2009–12): ▲3.2%
  - Dwellings: 694

Hudson is a newer residential neighbourhood in north west Edmonton, Alberta, Canada. Before development, the site was home of Edmonton International Speedway, a drive-in theatre, and a driving range.

Almost four out of five (78%) of residences in the neighbourhood are single-family dwellings. All but one of the remainder are duplexes. Almost all residences are owner-occupied.

== Demographics ==
In the City of Edmonton's 2012 municipal census, Hudson had a population of 2,020 living in 694 dwellings, a 3.2% change from its 2009 population of 1,957. With a land area of 0.57 km^{2} (0.22 sq mi), it had a population density of 3,543.9 people/km^{2} in 2012.

== Surrounding neighbourhoods ==
The neighbourhood is bounded on three sides by the neighbourhood of Pembina and on one side by the neighbourhood of Cumberland. A short distance to the east is the Castledowns neighbourhood of Baranow. A short distance to the south is the neighbourhood of Wellington.
