= Edmonton-Roper =

Defunct provincial electoral district in Alberta, Canada

Alberta electoral district

Defunct provincial electoral district
- Legislature: Legislative Assembly of Alberta
- District created: 1993
- District abolished: 1997
- First contested: 1993
- Last contested: 1993

Edmonton-Roper was a provincial electoral district in Alberta, Canada, mandated to return a single member to the Legislative Assembly of Alberta using the first past the post method of voting from 1993 to 1997.

== History ==
=== Members of the Legislative Assembly (MLAs) ===
Members of the Legislative Assembly for Edmonton-Roper
Assembly	Years	Member	Party
See Edmonton-Calder electoral district from 1971-1993, and Edmonton-Glengarry electoral district from 1979-1993
23rd	1993–1997	Sine Chadi	Liberal
See Edmonton-Castle Downs electoral district from 1997-Present

== Election results ==
=== 1993 ===
1993 Alberta general election
Party	Candidate	Votes	%	±%
Liberal	Sine Chadi	5,872	52.63%	–
Progressive Conservative	John Belzerowski	2,828	25.35%	–
New Democratic	Christie Mjolsness	2,362	21.17%	–
Natural Law	Allan Gwynn	95	0.85%	–
Total		11,157	–	–
Rejected, spoiled, and declined		22	–	–
Eligible electors / turnout		18,993	58.86%	–
Liberal pickup new district.				
Source(s) Source: "Edmonton-Roper Official Results 1993 Alberta general election". Alberta Heritage Community Foundation.

== See also ==
- List of Alberta provincial electoral districts
- Canadian provincial electoral districts
