= List of Alberta provincial electoral districts =

Alberta provincial electoral districts are currently single member ridings that each elect one member to the Legislative Assembly of Alberta. There are 87 districts fixed in law in Alberta, Canada.

== History ==
The Calgary district in 1930

The original 25 districts were drawn up by Liberal Member of Parliament Frank Oliver prior to the first general election of 1905. The original boundaries were widely regarded as being gerrymandered to favour the Alberta Liberal Party, although the Liberal Party did receive the majority of votes in the 1905 election and thus rightly formed majority government. Every boundary redistribution since 1905 has been based on the original boundaries, with districts being split or merged.

Starting in 1909, districts were grouped to make multiple-member districts. Most members continued to be elected in single-member districts, but every election from 1909 to 1955 saw members elected in one or more multi-member districts.

From 1905 to 1924 with only a few exceptions each district elected a single member on the first past the post system. Calgary and Edmonton as well as Medicine Hat were elected on a plurality block vote, where 2 or 5 members were elected in a city-wide district and each voter could cast as many votes as seats to be filled.

There were also two cases where members were elected outside of the geographical districts and did not represent any districts. Such was the case in the world wars when Albertans serving overseas voted for their own representatives.

From 1924 to 1956 Calgary and Edmonton MLAs were elected in multiple-member districts encompassing whole cities using single transferable vote (STV) to elect five to seven members. In 1926, Medicine Hat was a two-member district, electing its members through STV. Outside these cities, single-member districts elected single MLAs using the alternative voting system (instant-runoff voting, IRV), with vote transfers taking place only if no candidate had a majority of the vote in the first count.

By-elections in the two big cities during this period were conducted using IRV. Under STV, some results were known as soon as the first vote count was done, but some seats took a couple days of vote transfers to fill. But the mixed representation elected in each city under STV, reflective of the mixed sentiment of the city's voters, was thought worth the wait.

There were no district changes between 1926 and 1940. But Edmonton and Calgary were given one more member then reverted down to five members again in 1940.

With Alberta in a population boom in the 1950s and Calgary and Edmonton growing, STV may have been seen as too complicated, with vote counting taking days before final results could be announced. But the Social Credit government's rationale for the change away from STV and IRV was that a large number of votes were being declared spoiled. No other major social unit favoured the move, but the government made the change anyway. The government felt threatened by the growing number of opposition MLAs being elected (although it was still taking more than 60 percent of the seats in the Legislature). In 1959 the government returned Alberta to first-past-the-post elections in single-member districts, last used across the province in 1905. No government has since changed the electoral system (although since then the number of members has increased from 61 to 87).

In 1977 Elections Alberta was established as an independent, non-partisan office of the Legislative Assembly responsible for administering provincial elections, by-elections and referendums.

=== 1990s ===
The early 1990s proved to be a contentious period for delineation of electoral districts in Alberta. The Supreme Court of British Columbia ruling in Dixon v. Attorney General of British Columbia in 1989 invalidated the provincial electoral district re-distribution due to wide variations between electoral district populations for British Columbia, finding these differences inconsistent with the Charter of Rights and Freedoms. Cognizant of this the Alberta Legislature tasked a Special Committee chaired by Taber-Warner MLA Bob Bogle to evaluate the re-distribution of electoral districts in the province. The Report of the Select Special Committee on Electoral Boundaries was submitted to the Legislature in November 1990 and was referred to the Court of Appeal of Alberta. While the Court of Appeals reference found the boundaries consistent with the Charter, the report was scrapped and amendments to the Electoral Divisions Act were introduced in early 1991 to effectively "Charter-proof" the new districts.

The same Select Committee was tasked with creating the new report which was presented to the Legislature in November 1992, and once again referred to the Court of Appeal of Alberta to rule on the constitutional validity of the boundaries. The four Progressive Conservative MLAs on the Select Committee (Bob Bogle, Stockwell Day, Pat Nelson, Mike Cardinal) participated fully in developing the report, while the Opposition refused to appoint any MLAs. Subsequently, the boundaries were implemented and used for the June 1993 Alberta general election. The Court of Appeal of Alberta withheld Charter condemnation, but found numerous issues with the process and requirements put forward for the re-distribution. In particular the members of the Select Committee were unable to provide sufficient rationale to the court for a number of the boundaries and district sizes recommended in the report. The court explicitly voiced the opinion that a proper electoral boundary review was necessary within the term of the present government (which expired in 1997).

Following the issues in the early 1990s, a semi-independent boundary commissions were set up to tweak the boundaries to population changes that occurred after every census. Committees are composed of a neutral judge, two members appointed by the governing party, and two members appointed by the official opposition.

=== 2010 electoral boundary commission ===
The 2009/2010 Alberta Electoral Boundaries Commission was established on 31 July 2009, and was chaired by Justice J. M. Walter and members included Keith Archer, Peter Dobbie, Brian Evans and Allyson Jeffs. The Final Report by the commission with recommendations was submitted to the legislature on 24 June 2010. The recommendations of the commission were accepted and the electoral division boundaries were implemented by Bill 28, Electoral Divisions Act.

The 2010 redistribution increased the number of seats in the Legislative Assembly from 83 to 87, a decision by Premier Ed Stelmach to ensure rural districts would not be removed in the increasingly urban Alberta. The commission's final report warned that Alberta would have to re-evaluate how seats are distributed to rural areas specifically in regards to the province's large northern areas. The report warned that the population discrepancy required to preserve lesser populated rural electoral districts in the face of growing urban districts remained controversial for Albertans and elected representatives.

A minority position in the Commission found the division of Alberta into three geographic areas (Calgary, Edmonton, other) problematic as it effectively ignored fast growing mid-sized cities which were fragmented into hybrid rural-urban constituencies.

=== 2017 electoral boundary commission ===
The Electoral Boundaries Commission Act requires that a commission be appointed during the first session of the legislature following every second general election. The commission requires a non-partisan chair, two government members recommended by the premier, and two opposition members. Due to the decision by Premier Jim Prentice to call an early election in 2015, the commission was required to be formed before the prescribed date in time for the next election in 2019. Previous commissions had provided for modest redistributions in favour of Alberta's cities which according to Political Scientist Roger Epp brought forward "deep rural anxieties" regarding declining population and influence in Alberta.

The commission was provided with a mandate which kept the size of the legislature fixed at 87 seats. The commission, led by Justice Myra Bielby, made only incremental changes adding one new seat in Calgary and Edmonton, as well as a seat in the Airdrie area. The commission did however make significant statements on the rural-urban divide, noting "Alberta is no longer entirely or primarily rural in nature" and a "disproportionate preservation of the rural voice" was no longer acceptable or feasible under law. While the Electoral Boundaries Commission Act permits up to four districts to be formed with a population 50 per cent lower than the average population, the commission recommended that only two of these districts be formed. The districts include Central Peace-Notley which had a population of 28,993 and area of 47,311 km^{2}, and Lesser Slave Lake which had a population of 27,818, compared to the average population of electoral districts of 46,803 following redistribution.

A minority opinion was presented by commission members appointed by the opposition, arguing that Alberta's rate of growth was a threat to "a critical part of our history, culture, and primary economic voice" which is at risk of being lost through continued redistribution.

=== Number of districts ===
As is the case with nearly every other Canadian jurisdiction, the number of districts has not increased in proportion to the growth in the provincial population. In 1905, 25,000 votes were cast across the province to elect 25 MLAs. In 1982, 945,000 votes, almost 40 times the 1905 total, were cast across the province to choose 79 MLAs, less than four times the 1905 seat total. Prior to the 1986 election the number of districts was fixed by law at 83 thus any change to that number would have to be enacted by the legislature. Even though the population has increased by more than 40 percent between 1986 and 2009, the number of members did not change. Finally due to changes wrought in 2010, the 2012 election saw the number of members increase to 87, where it has stayed despite a 15 percent increase in the provincial population from 2009 to 2021.

== Naming conventions ==
Like the federal districts in Alberta, urban ridings traditionally begin with the city name. This has generally applied where an urban area is divided and joined with rural areas, such as Grande Prairie-Wapiti and Fort McMurray-Lac La Biche. Notable exceptions are Cypress-Medicine Hat and Brooks-Medicine Hat, which follow the convention in other rural areas of listing communities in alphabetical order (another exception being Vermilion-Lloydminster-Wainwright).

Unlike federal practice, Alberta uses hyphens to join all name elements. This is true for electoral districts named for multiple communities as well as urban districts (where the city name is followed by a direction, a neighbourhood, a landmark, or the name of a historical politician). For example, compare the provincial Fort McMurray-Conklin with the federal Fort McMurray—Cold Lake, where the em dash is used instead of the hyphen to join names of separate communities. Also compare the provincial Edmonton-Strathcona with the federal Edmonton Strathcona, where a space indicates that Strathcona is a neighbourhood of Edmonton.

Current districts named for individuals include several premiers:

- Calgary-Klein for Ralph Klein,
- Calgary-Lougheed for Peter Lougheed,
- Edmonton-Manning for Ernest Manning, and
- Edmonton-Rutherford for Alexander Rutherford.

Three are named for former party leaders:

- Calgary-Shaw for former Liberal leader Joseph Tweed Shaw,
- Central Peace-Notley for former NDP leader Grant Notley, and
- Edmonton-Decore for former Liberal leader and Edmonton mayor Laurence Decore.

In addition, Edmonton-McClung is named for suffragette and MLA Nellie McClung. The abolished riding of Edmonton-Roper was named for CCF leader Elmer Roper.

== List of provincial electoral districts ==
=== Current districts ===
For a list of current members, see Legislative Assembly of Alberta § Current members.

	Name	Created	Population (2016)
1	Calgary-Acadia	2012	48,966
2	Calgary-Beddington	2019	50,220
3	Calgary-Bow	1971	51,358
4	Calgary-Buffalo	1971	49,907
5	Calgary-Cross	1993	50,634
6	Calgary-Currie	1971	48,403
7	Calgary-East	1963*	50,838
8	Calgary-Edgemont	2019	50,803
9	Calgary-Elbow	1971	48,618
10	Calgary-Falconridge	2019	52,688
11	Calgary-Fish Creek	1979	47,691
12	Calgary-Foothills	1971	45,715
13	Calgary-Glenmore	1959	49,543
14	Calgary-Hays	2004	50,782
15	Calgary-Klein	2012	50,338
16	Calgary-Lougheed	1993	42,956
17	Calgary-Bhullar-McCall	1971	48,735
18	Calgary-Mountain View	1971	49,442
19	Calgary-North	1957*	39,120
20	Calgary-North East	1959*	40,366
21	Calgary-North West	1979	48,766
22	Calgary-Peigan	2019	45,810
23	Calgary-Shaw	1986	45,169
24	Calgary-South East	1959*	40,309
25	Calgary-Varsity	1993	45,742
26	Calgary-West	1959	46,266
27	Edmonton-Beverly-Clareview	1997	46,496
28	Edmonton-Castle Downs	1997	46,112
29	Edmonton-City Centre	2019	47,715
30	Edmonton-Decore	2004	48,927
31	Edmonton-Ellerslie	1993	48,024
32	Edmonton-Glenora	1971	45,519
33	Edmonton-Gold Bar	1971	45,446
34	Edmonton-Highlands-Norwood	2004	43,550
35	Edmonton-Manning	1993	48,376
36	Edmonton-McClung	1993	44,625
37	Edmonton-Meadows	2019	51,776
38	Edmonton-Mill Woods	1979	50,265
39	Edmonton-North West	1959*	45,523
40	Edmonton-Riverview	1997	45,214
41	Edmonton-Rutherford	1993	47,353
42	Edmonton-South	1917*	45,801
43	Edmonton-South West	2012	45,901
44	Edmonton-Strathcona	1971	46,578
45	Edmonton-West Henday	2019	43,046
46	Edmonton-Whitemud	1971	46,833
47	Airdrie-Cochrane	2019	51,170
48	Airdrie-East	2019	49,978
49	Athabasca-Barrhead-Westlock	2019	46,920
50	Banff-Kananaskis	2019	46,824
51	Bonnyville-Cold Lake-St. Paul	2019	53,809
52	Brooks-Medicine Hat	2019	51,070
53	Camrose	1921*	44,082
54	Cardston-Siksika	2019	42,655
55	Central Peace-Notley	2019	28,993
56	Chestermere-Strathmore	2019	48,203
57	Cypress-Medicine Hat	1993	50,109
58	Drayton Valley-Devon	2012	46,637
59	Drumheller-Stettler	2004	41,535
60	Fort McMurray-Lac La Biche	2019	44,166
61	Fort McMurray-Wood Buffalo	2004	41,420
62	Fort Saskatchewan-Vegreville	2004	52,141
63	Grande Prairie	1930*	46,343
64	Grande Prairie-Wapiti	1993	48,481
65	Highwood	1971	48,813
66	Innisfail-Sylvan Lake	1993	46,717
67	Lac Ste. Anne-Parkland	2019	46,546
68	Lacombe-Ponoka	2004	44,898
69	Leduc-Beaumont	2012	48,337
70	Lesser Slave Lake	1971	27,818
71	Lethbridge-East	1971	46,204
72	Lethbridge-West	1971	46,525
73	Livingstone-Macleod	1997	48,120
74	Maskwacis-Wetaskiwin	2019	43,798
75	Morinville-St. Albert	2019	50,225
76	Olds-Didsbury-Three Hills	1997	49,418
77	Peace River	1905	39,974
78	Red Deer-North	1986	47,672
79	Red Deer-South	1986	52,743
80	Rimbey-Rocky Mountain House-Sundre	2012	45,138
81	Sherwood Park	1986	45,992
82	Spruce Grove-Stony Plain	2019	51,267
83	St. Albert	1905	47,745
84	Strathcona-Sherwood Park	2012	47,853
85	Taber-Warner	1963*	42,625
86	Vermilion-Lloydminster-Wainwright	2019	46,042
87	West Yellowhead	1986	50,604

=== Districts prior to 2019 election ===
Name	Created	Population		Median Income, 2011
Name	Created	2011	2016	Median Income, 2011
Airdrie	2012	45,955	57,930	$60,524
Athabasca-Sturgeon-Redwater	2012	37,060	38,051	$56,741
Banff-Cochrane	1940*	46,075	63,990	$56,603
Barrhead-Morinville-Westlock	2004	40,670	45,030	$48,588
Battle River-Wainwright	2004	37,675	36,905	$46,988
Bonnyville-Cold Lake	1997	35,165	39,696	$59,996
Calgary-Acadia	2012	37,890	43,000	$53,262
Calgary-Bow	1971	39,520	45,049	$64,985
Calgary-Buffalo	1971	39,415	52,963	$54,913
Calgary-Cross	1993	46,195	59,406	$42,992
Calgary-Currie	1971	44,450	51,611	$53,241
Calgary-East	1963*	47,735	56,618	$43,880
Calgary-Elbow	1971	45,760	48,363	$67,959
Calgary-Fish Creek	1979	38,455	40,566	$64,793
Calgary-Foothills	1971	43,015	54,180	$65,262
Calgary-Fort	1997	41,660	51,083	$46,862
Calgary-Glenmore	1959	46,095	48,972	$58,712
Calgary-Greenway	2012	46,130	56,474	$41,333
Calgary-Hawkwood	2012	47,520	52,223	$64,978
Calgary-Hays	2004	41,505	46,893	$66,327
Calgary-Klein	2012	42,800	49,130	$55,235
Calgary-Lougheed	1993	47,285	54,734	$60,144
Calgary-Mackay-Nose Hill	2012	42,535	56,625	$54,491
Calgary-McCall	1971	45,245	68,523	$42,245
Calgary-Mountain View	1971	40,850	47,808	$64,783
Calgary-North West	1979	46,460	51,011	$76,108
Calgary-Northern Hills	2012	51,610	61,377	$58,324
Calgary-Shaw	1986	43,940	48,056	$63,218
Calgary-South East	1959*	48,945	79,034	$64,020
Calgary-Varsity	1993	40,875	48,107	$60,908
Calgary-West	1959	40,950	45,966	$85,624
Cardston-Taber-Warner	1997	38,505	43,467	$44,658
Chestermere-Rocky View	2012	45,925	46,966	$64,826
Cypress-Medicine Hat	1993	40,345	41,148	$50,184
Drayton Valley-Devon	2012	40,215	47,883	$50,869
Drumheller-Stettler	2004	36,840	37,852	$43,459
Dunvegan-Central Peace-Notley	2012	23,050	25,192	$44,932
Edmonton-Beverly-Clareview	1997	45,475	51,834	$49,755
Edmonton-Calder	1971*	44,655	53,918	$52,833
Edmonton-Castle Downs	1997	45,740	52,775	$54,878
Edmonton-Centre	1959	40,750	51,659	$48,993
Edmonton-Decore	2004	43,755	49,942	$48,398
Edmonton-Ellerslie	1993	42,540	59,091	$54,820
Edmonton-Glenora	1971	42,000	48,138	$50,122
Edmonton-Gold Bar	1971	42,540	44,691	$58,042
Edmonton-Highlands-Norwood	2004	43,020	54,804	$46,860
Edmonton-Manning	1993	44,860	51,953	$53,328
Edmonton-McClung	1993	39,265	42,971	$55,752
Edmonton-Meadowlark	1971	41,925	52,039	$49,474
Edmonton-Mill Creek	1997	41,495	56,995	$52,849
Edmonton-Mill Woods	1979	41,030	48,364	$49,154
Edmonton-Riverview	1997	40,000	45,517	$57,990
Edmonton-Rutherford	1993	40,185	45,255	$57,782
Edmonton-South West	2012	43,780	66,489	$64,343
Edmonton-Strathcona	1971	40,315	44,400	$51,350
Edmonton-Whitemud	1971	48,860	52,574	$72,504
Fort McMurray-Conklin	2012	26,075	29,533	$98,417
Fort McMurray-Wood Buffalo	2004	40,855	59,576	$106,908
Fort Saskatchewan-Vegreville	2004	42,945	49,399	$57,137
Grande Prairie-Smoky	1993	44,115	57,580	$57,038
Grande Prairie-Wapiti	1993	48,800	56,975	$60,916
Highwood	1971	48,940	56,268	$60,078
Innisfail-Sylvan Lake	1993	42,230	43,996	$51,930
Lac La Biche-St. Paul-Two Hills	2012	30,790	38,260	$43,825
Lacombe-Ponoka	2004	39,760	44,389	$49,907
Leduc-Beaumont	2012	46,550	52,734	$58,093
Lesser Slave Lake	1971	27,700	30,094	$49,192
Lethbridge-East	1971	43,175	44,927	$45,912
Lethbridge-West	1971	40,285	46,211	$49,241
Little Bow	1913	37,755	39,627	$41,775
Livingstone-Macleod	1997	42,700	42,794	$46,943
Medicine Hat	1905*	38,350	44,469	$48,013
Olds-Didsbury-Three Hills	1997	43,010	47,038	$47,923
Peace River	1905	35,680	41,492	$49,380
Red Deer-North	1986	43,765	58,914	$49,891
Red Deer-South	1986	46,800	51,627	$54,916
Rimbey-Rocky Mountain House-Sundre	2012	40,205	41,942	$44,905
Sherwood Park	1986	41,475	45,474	$69,023
Spruce Grove-St. Albert	2012	51,800	59,453	$63,117
St. Albert	1905	44,420	48,430	$67,036
Stony Plain	1905	42,430	47,018	$63,712
Strathcona-Sherwood Park	2012	46,620	46,971	$71,299
Strathmore-Brooks	1997	44,900	52,474	$50,121
Vermilion-Lloydminster	1993	36,540	40,544	$52,877
West Yellowhead	1986	30,995	36,901	$62,422
Wetaskiwin-Camrose	1993	41,890	43,350	$47,164
Whitecourt-Ste. Anne	1993	37,190	39,128	$53,828

* District has been abolished and re-established.

=== Historical provincial electoral districts ===
- Acadia
- Acadia-Coronation
- Airdrie
- Airdrie-Chestermere
- Airdrie-Rocky View
- Alexandra
- Athabasca
- Athabasca-Lac La Biche
- Athabasca-Redwater
- Athabasca-Sturgeon-Redwater
- Athabasca-Wabasca
- Banff
- Banff-Cochrane
- Barrhead
- Barrhead-Morinville-Westlock
- Barrhead-Westlock
- Battle River-Wainwright
- Beaver River
- Bonnyville
- Bonnyville-Cold Lake
- Bow Valley
- Bow Valley-Empress
- Bruce
- Calgary
- Calgary Bowness
- Calgary Centre
- Calgary-Egmont
- Calgary-Forest Lawn
- Calgary-Fort
- Calgary-Hawkwood
- Calgary-Mackay
- Calgary-Mackay-Nose Hill
- Calgary-McKnight
- Calgary-Millican
- Calgary-Montrose
- Calgary-North Hill
- Calgary Nose Creek
- Calgary-Nose Hill
- Calgary Queens Park
- Calgary South
- Calgary Victoria Park
- Cardston
- Cardston-Chief Mountain
- Cardston-Taber-Warner
- Centre Calgary
- Chestermere-Rocky View
- Chinook
- Claresholm
- Clearwater
- Clover Bar
- Clover Bar-Fort Saskatchewan
- Cochrane
- Cypress
- Cypress-Redcliff
- Didsbury
- Drayton Valley
- Drayton Valley-Calmar
- Drumheller
- Drumheller-Chinook
- Drumheller-Gleichen
- Dunvegan
- Dunvegan-Central Peace
- Dunvegan-Central Peace-Notley
- Edmonton
- Edmonton-Avonmore
- Edmonton-Belmont
- Edmonton-Beverly
- Edmonton-Beverly-Belmont
- Edmonton-Calder
- Edmonton-Centre
- Edmonton East
- Edmonton-Glengarry
- Edmonton-Highlands
- Edmonton-Highlands-Beverly
- Edmonton-Kingsway
- Edmonton-Mayfield
- Edmonton-Meadowlark
- Edmonton-Mill Creek
- Edmonton North
- Edmonton North East
- Edmonton-Norwood
- Edmonton-Ottewell
- Edmonton-Parkallen
- Edmonton-Roper
- Edmonton-Sherwood Park
- Edmonton West
- Edson
- Empress
- Foothills-Rocky View
- Fort McMurray
- Fort McMurray-Conklin
- Gleichen
- Grande Prairie-Smoky
- Grouard
- Hand Hills
- Hand Hills-Acadia
- Hanna-Oyen
- High River
- Innisfail
- Jasper West
- Lac La Biche
- Lac La Biche-McMurray
- Lac La Biche-St. Paul
- Lac La Biche-St. Paul-Two Hills
- Lac Ste. Anne
- Lacombe
- Lacombe-Stettler
- Leduc
- Leduc-Beaumont-Devon
- Lethbridge
- Lethbridge City
- Lethbridge District
- Little Bow
- Lloydminster
- Macleod
- Medicine Hat
- Medicine Hat-Redcliff
- Nanton
- Nanton-Claresholm
- North Calgary
- Okotoks
- Okotoks-High River
- Olds
- Olds-Didsbury
- Pakan
- Pembina
- Pincher Creek
- Pincher Creek-Crowsnest
- Pincher Creek-Macleod
- Ponoka
- Ponoka-Rimbey
- Redcliff
- Redwater
- Redwater-Andrew
- Red Deer
- Ribstone
- Rocky Mountain
- Rocky Mountain House
- Rosebud
- Sedgewick
- Sedgewick-Coronation
- Smoky River
- South Calgary
- Spirit River
- Spirit River-Fairview
- Spruce Grove-St. Albert
- Spruce Grove-Sturgeon-St. Albert
- St. Paul
- Stettler
- Stony Plain
- Strathcona
- Strathcona Centre
- Strathcona East
- Strathcona South
- Strathcona West
- Strathmore-Brooks
- Sturgeon
- Taber
- Three Hills
- Three Hills-Airdrie
- Vegreville
- Vegreville-Bruce
- Vegreville-Viking
- Vermilion
- Vermilion-Lloydminster
- Vermilion-Viking
- Victoria
- Wainwright
- Warner
- Westlock-Sturgeon
- Wetaskiwin-Camrose
- Wetaskiwin-Leduc
- Whitecourt
- Whitecourt-Ste. Anne
- Whitford
- Willingdon
- Willingdon-Two Hills

== See also ==
- Canadian provincial electoral districts
