= Edmonton-Calder =

Defunct provincial electoral district in Alberta, Canada

Coordinates: 53.59°N 113.60°W

Alberta electoral district
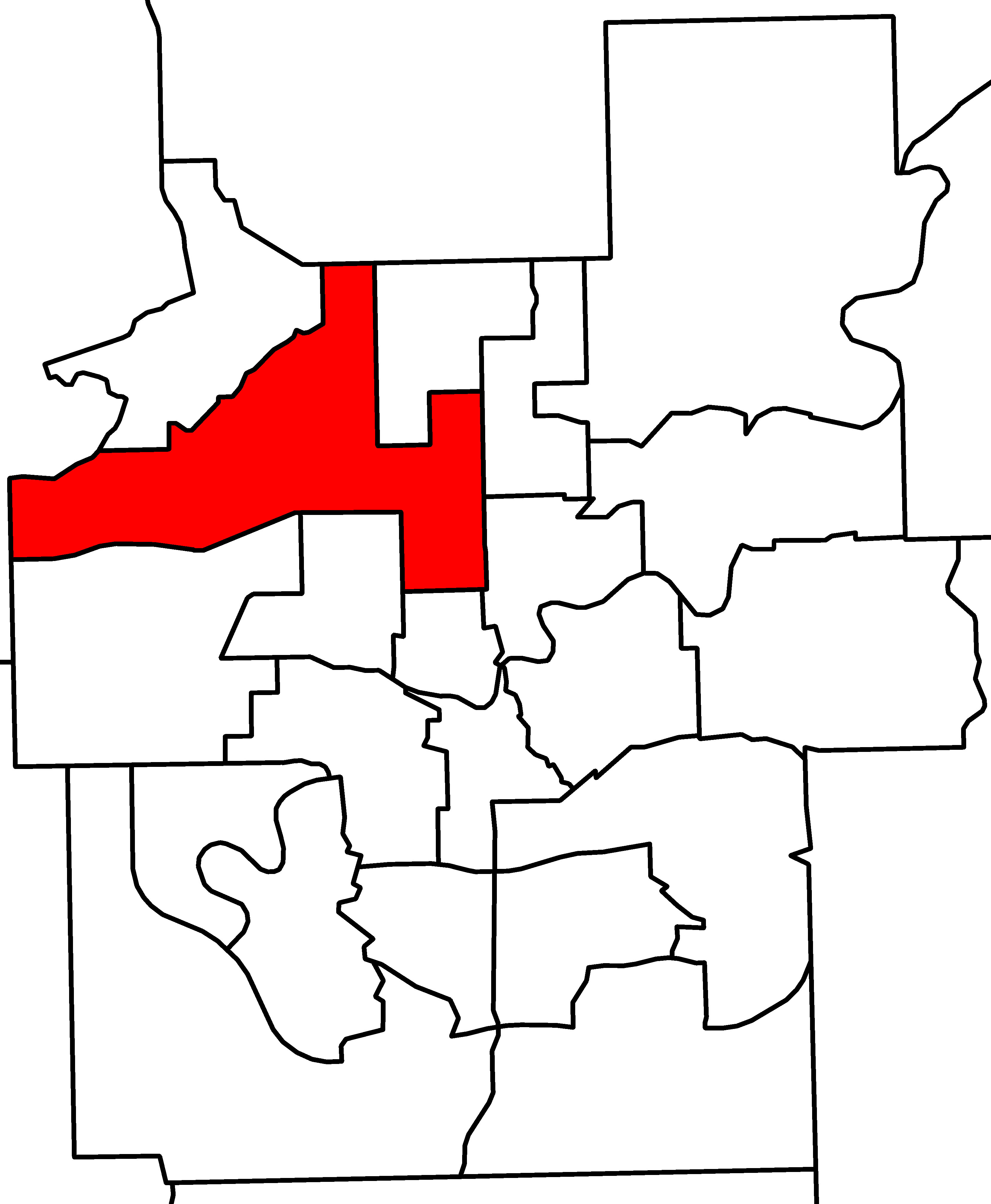
- 2010 boundaries
- District created: 1971
- District abolished: 1993
- District re-created: 1996
- District re-abolished: 2019
- First contested: 1971
- Last contested: 2015

Edmonton-Calder was a provincial electoral district in Alberta, Canada, mandated to return a single member to the Legislative Assembly of Alberta using the first past the post method of voting from 1971 to 1993 and again from 1996 to 2019.

== History ==
The first Edmonton-Calder electoral district was created in the 1971 boundary redistribution from the electoral districts of Edmonton North West and Edmonton North. It was abolished in 1993 to create parts Edmonton-Mayfield and Edmonton-Roper.

Calder was re-created in the same general area out of Mayfield and Roper in the 1996 boundary redistribution. The 2010 electoral boundary re-distribution lead to significant changes to the district, the northern boundaries were pushed from 137 Avenue to the Edmonton city limits between 127 Street and 184 Street into land that used to be part of Edmonton-Castle Downs. The south boundary which used to run along Stony Plain Road was pushed north to Yellowhead Trail ceding land to Edmonton-Meadowlark and Edmonton-Glenora.

Edmonton-Calder was dissolved prior to the 2019 Alberta general election and re-distributed into Edmonton-City Centre, Edmonton-West Henday, and Edmonton-North West electoral districts.

=== Boundary history ===
26 Edmonton-Calder 2003 boundaries
Bordering districts
North	East	West	South
Edmonton-Castle Downs, St. Albert	Edmonton-Decore, Edmonton-Highlands-Norwood	Spruce Grove-Sturgeon-St. Albert	Edmonton-Centre, Edmonton-Glenora, Edmonton-Meadowlark
riding map goes here			
Legal description from Electoral Divisions Act, S.A. 2003, c. E-4.1
Starting at the intersection of the west Edmonton city boundary with the south shore of Big Lake; then 1. northeast along the city boundary to the intersection with 137 Avenue; 2. east along 137 Avenue to 113A Street (Castle Downs Road); 3. north along 113A Street to 153 Avenue; 4. east along 153 Avenue to 97 Street; 5. south along 97 Street to 111 Avenue; 6. west along 111 Avenue to 121 Street; 7. north along 121 Street and its northerly extension to 118 Avenue; 8. west along 118 Avenue to the northbound lanes of 170 Street; 9. south along the northbound lanes of 170 Street to Stony Plain Road; 10. west along Stony Plain Road to the west Edmonton city boundary; 11. north along the west city boundary to the starting point.
Note:

29 Edmonton-Calder 2010 boundaries
Bordering districts
North	East	West	South
Athabasca-Sturgeon-Redwater, Edmonton-Castle Downs and St. Albert	Edmonton-Decore and Edmonton-Highlands-Norwood	Spruce Grove-St. Albert	Edmonton-Centre, Edmonton-Glenora and Edmonton-Meadowlark
Legal description from the Statutes of Alberta 2010, Electoral Divisions Act.

=== Electoral history ===
Edmonton-Calder
Assembly	Years	Member	Party
Riding created from Edmonton North West and Edmonton West
17th	1971–1975	Tom Chambers	Progressive Conservative
18th	1975–1979	Tom Chambers	Progressive Conservative
19th	1979–1982	Tom Chambers	Progressive Conservative
20th	1982–1985	Tom Chambers	Progressive Conservative
21st	1986–1989	Christie Mjolsness	New Democratic
22nd	1989–1993	Christie Mjolsness	New Democratic
Riding dissolved into Edmonton-Mayfield and Edmonton-Roper
Riding re-created from Edmonton-Mayfield and Edmonton-Roper
24th	1997–2001	Lance White	Liberal
25th	2001–2004	Brent Rathgeber	Progressive Conservative
26th	2004–2008	David Eggen	New Democratic
27th	2008–2012	Doug Elniski	Progressive Conservative
28th	2012–2014	David Eggen	New Democratic
29th	2015–2019	David Eggen	New Democratic
Riding dissolved into Edmonton-City Centre, Edmonton-North West and Edmonton-West Henday

The electoral district has existed twice since it was first created in 1971. The election held that year saw a hotly contested race between Social Credit incumbent Edgar Gerhart who had been MLA for the old electoral district of Edmonton Northwest and Progressive Conservative candidate Tom Chambers. On election night Chambers defeated Gerhart with just over 50% of the popular vote. His party went on to form its first government that election .

Chambers won his second term in 1975 with a landslide majority of almost 75% of the popular vote. He would be appointed to a cabinet portfolio in the government of Peter Lougheed in 1979. Chambers was re-elected twice more in 1979 and 1982 with shrinking majorities. He retired from office at dissolution in 1986.

The 1986 election was won by NDP candidate Christie Mjolsness. She had previously run against Chambers in the 1982 election and increased the percentage of her popular vote and won on the collapse of the Progressive Conservative vote despite losing raw popular vote. She was re-elected in 1989 in a hotly contested battle with Liberal candidate Lance White.

The riding was abolished in 1993 and redistricted to make Edmonton-Mayfield and Edmonton-Roper. Mjolsness would run for re-election in Roper and be defeated while White would run in Mayfield and be elected defeating incumbent Alex McEachern.

Calder would be re-created out of the two ridings in the 1996 boundary redistribution. White and McEachern would face each other for the second time with White coming out the victor. White would win just over 40% of the popular vote while McEachern finished in third place.

The riding would change hands in 2001 in a very closely contested election as Progressive Conservative candidate Brent Rathgeber defeated White with just over 40% of the popular vote. The NDP would return to office in the next election as NDP candidate David Eggen defeated Rathgeber by a close margin with just over 36% of the popular vote.

The 2008 election would see Eggen defeated by Progressive Conservative candidate Doug Elniski in another close race, with Elniski picking up 41% of the popular vote to Eggen's 40%. Elinski announced his retirement, and did not run again in the 2012 election.

David Eggen was returned to office in the 2012 general election and in the 2015 general election. The 2012 election was another close race, with under 4% difference between Eggen and PC Bev Esslinger. During the 2015 election, Eggen was re-elected with over 70% of the popular vote, marking one of the best results for the provincial NDP in the province.

== Legislative election results ==
=== 1971 ===
1971 Alberta general election
Party	Candidate	Votes	%	±%
Progressive Conservative	Tom Chambers	5,931	52.23%	–
Social Credit	Edgar Gerhart	3,653	32.17%	–
New Democratic	Bill Glass	1,772	15.60%	–
Total		11,356	–	–
Rejected, spoiled and declined		48	–	–
Eligible electors / turnout		15,744	72.43%	–
Progressive Conservative pickup new district.				
Source(s) Source: "Edmonton-Calder Official Results 1971 Alberta general election". Alberta Heritage Community Foundation.

=== 1975 ===
1975 Alberta general election
Party	Candidate	Votes	%	±%
Progressive Conservative	Tom Chambers	5,689	68.17%	15.94%
New Democratic	Burke Barker	1,640	19.65%	4.05%
Liberal	Jack Pickett	620	7.43%	–
Independent	Keith Lawson	396	4.75%	–
Total		8,345	–	–
Rejected, spoiled and declined		26	–	–
Eligible electors / turnout		16,675	50.20%	-22.23%
Progressive Conservative hold		Swing		14.23%
Source(s) Source: "Edmonton-Calder Official Results 1975 Alberta general election". Alberta Heritage Community Foundation.

=== 1979 ===
1979 Alberta general election
Party	Candidate	Votes	%	±%
Progressive Conservative	Tom Chambers	5,205	58.47%	-9.70%
New Democratic	Bill Kobluk	2,180	24.49%	4.84%
Social Credit	Dan R. Service	982	11.03%	–
Liberal	Richard Guthrie	535	6.01%	-1.42%
Total		8,902	–	–
Rejected, spoiled and declined		45	–	–
Eligible electors / turnout		19,483	45.69%	-4.51%
Progressive Conservative hold		Swing		-7.27%
Source(s) Source: "Edmonton-Calder Official Results 1979 Alberta general election". Alberta Heritage Community Foundation.

=== 1982 ===
1982 Alberta general election
Party	Candidate	Votes	%	±%
Progressive Conservative	Tom Chambers	8,442	55.38%	-3.09%
New Democratic	Christie Mjolsness	5,527	36.26%	11.77%
Western Canada Concept	Walter Stack	1,274	8.36%	–
Total		15,243	–	–
Rejected, spoiled and declined		19	–	–
Eligible electors / turnout		26,010	58.68%	12.99%
Progressive Conservative hold		Swing		-7.43%
Source(s) Source: "Edmonton-Calder Official Results 1982 Alberta general election". Alberta Heritage Community Foundation.

=== 1986 ===
1986 Alberta general election
Party	Candidate	Votes	%	±%
New Democratic	Christie Mjolsness	5,114	50.70%	14.44%
Progressive Conservative	Tony Falcone	2,910	28.85%	-26.53%
Liberal	Al Iafolla	1,925	19.09%	–
Western Canada Concept	Dave Draginda	111	1.10%	-7.26%
Communist	Martin Robbert	26	0.26%	–
Total		10,086	–	–
Rejected, spoiled and declined		11	–	–
Eligible electors / turnout		22,153	45.58%	-13.10%
New Democratic gain from Progressive Conservative		Swing		1.36%
Source(s) Source: "Edmonton-Calder Official Results 1986 Alberta general election". Alberta Heritage Community Foundation.

=== 1989 ===
1989 Alberta general election
Party	Candidate	Votes	%	±%
New Democratic	Christie Mjolsness	5,338	42.77%	-7.94%
Liberal	Lance White	4,435	35.53%	16.45%
Progressive Conservative	Aldo De Luca	2,709	21.70%	-7.15%
Total		12,482	–	–
Rejected, spoiled and declined		23	–	–
Eligible electors / turnout		22,714	55.05%	9.48%
New Democratic hold		Swing		-7.31%
Source(s) Source: "Edmonton-Calder Official Results 1989 Alberta general election". Alberta Heritage Community Foundation.

=== 1997 ===
1997 Alberta general election
Party	Candidate	Votes	%	±%
Liberal	Lance White	4,802	40.31%	–
Progressive Conservative	Lynn Faulder	3,860	32.40%	–
New Democratic	Alex McEachern	3,250	27.28%	–
Total		11,912	–	–
Rejected, spoiled and declined		31	–	–
Eligible electors / turnout		22,317	53.52%	–
Liberal pickup new district.				
Source(s) Source: "Edmonton-Calder Official Results 1997 Alberta general election". Alberta Heritage Community Foundation.

=== 2001 ===
2001 Alberta general election
Party	Candidate	Votes	%	±%
Progressive Conservative	Brent Rathgeber	5,128	41.98%	9.58%
Liberal	Lance White	4,654	38.10%	-2.21%
New Democratic	Christine Burdett	2,432	19.91%	-7.37%
Total		12,214	–	–
Rejected, spoiled, and declined		24	–	–
Eligible electors / turnout		23,671	51.70%	-1.81%
Progressive Conservative gain from Liberal		Swing		-2.01%
Source(s) Source: "Edmonton-Calder Official Results 2001 Alberta general election". Alberta Heritage Community Foundation.

=== 2004 ===
2004 Alberta general election
Party	Candidate	Votes	%	±%
New Democratic	David Eggen	4,067	36.01%	16.10%
Progressive Conservative	Brent Rathgeber	3,730	33.02%	-8.96%
Liberal	Brad Smith	2,985	26.43%	-11.68%
Alberta Alliance	Vicki Kramer	513	4.54%	–
Total		11,295	–	–
Rejected, spoiled and declined		48	–	–
Eligible electors / turnout		23,153	48.99%	-2.71%
New Democratic gain from Progressive Conservative		Swing		-0.45%
Source(s) Source: "Edmonton-Calder Official Results 2004 Alberta general election". Alberta Heritage Community Foundation.

=== 2008 ===
2008 Alberta general election
Party	Candidate	Votes	%	±%
Progressive Conservative	Doug Elniski	4,557	40.86%	7.83%
New Democratic	David Eggen	4,356	39.05%	3.05%
Liberal	Jim Kane	1,839	16.49%	-9.94%
Green	Michael Brown	402	3.60%	–
Total		11,154	–	–
Rejected, spoiled and declined		39	–	–
Eligible electors / turnout		27,420	40.82%	-8.17%
Progressive Conservative gain from New Democratic		Swing		-0.59%
Source(s) Source: "Edmonton-Calder Official Results 2008 Alberta general election". Elections Alberta.

=== 2012 ===
2012 Alberta general election
Party	Candidate	Votes	%	±%
New Democratic	David Eggen	5,731	38.42%	-0.63%
Progressive Conservative	Bev Esslinger	5,177	34.71%	-6.15%
Wildrose	Rich Neumann	2,790	18.71%	–
Liberal	Alex Bosse	976	6.54%	-9.94%
Alberta Party	David Clark	189	1.27%	–
Social Credit	Margaret Saunter	52	0.35%	–
Total		14,915	–	–
Rejected, spoiled and declined		119	–	–
Eligible electors / turnout		29,535	50.90%	10.08%
New Democratic gain from Progressive Conservative		Swing		0.96%
Source(s) Source: "Edmonton-Calder Official Results 2012 Alberta general election". Elections Alberta.

=== 2015 ===
2015 Alberta general election
Party	Candidate	Votes	%	±%
New Democratic	David Eggen	12,837	70.72%	32.30%
Progressive Conservative	Thomas (Tom) Bradley	3,222	17.75%	-16.96%
Wildrose	Andrew Altimas	1,565	8.62%	-10.08%
Liberal	Amit (Sunny) Batra	527	2.90%	-3.64%
Total		18,151	–	–
Rejected, spoiled and declined		42	–	–
Eligible electors / turnout		36,266	50.17%	-0.74%
New Democratic hold		Swing		24.63%
Source(s) Source: "Edmonton-Calder Official Results 2015 Alberta general election". Elections Alberta.

== Senate nominee election results ==
=== 2004 ===
2004 Senate nominee election results: Edmonton-Calder				Turnout 49.21%	
Affiliation	Candidate	Votes	% votes	% ballots	Rank
Progressive Conservative	Betty Unger	4,272	15.41%	46.54%	2
Independent	Link Byfield	3,553	12.81%	38.71%	4
Progressive Conservative	Bert Brown	3,126	11.28%	34.06%	1
Progressive Conservative	Cliff Breitkreuz	2,867	10.34%	32.23%	3
Independent	Tom Sindlinger	2,662	9.60%	29.00%	9
Alberta Alliance	Michael Roth	2,608	9.41%	28.41%	7
Alberta Alliance	Gary Horan	2,292	8.27%	24.97%	10
Alberta Alliance	Vance Gough	2,283	8.24%	24.87%	8
Progressive Conservative	David Usherwood	2,210	7.97%	24.08%	6
Progressive Conservative	Jim Silye	1,847	6.67%	20.12%	5
Total votes		27,720	100%		
Total ballots		9,179	3.02 votes per ballot		
Rejected, spoiled and declined		2,215			

Voters had the option of selecting four candidates on the ballot.

== Student vote results ==
=== 2004 ===
Participating schools
Major General Griesbach School
Sir John Thompson Junior High School
St. Edmund School
Winterburn School

On November 19, 2004, a student vote was conducted at participating Alberta schools to parallel the 2004 Alberta general election results. The vote was designed to educate students and simulate the electoral process for persons who had not yet reached the legal majority. The vote was conducted in 80 of the 83 provincial electoral districts with students voting for actual election candidates. Schools with a large student body that reside in another electoral district had the option to vote for candidates outside of the electoral district than where they were physically located.

2004 Alberta student vote results
Affiliation	Candidate	Votes	%
Liberal	Brad Smith	241	40.30%
NDP	David Eggen	170	28.43%
Progressive Conservative	Brent Rathgeber	114	19.06%
Alberta Alliance	Vicki Kramer	73	12.21%
Total		598	100%
Rejected, spoiled and declined		19	

=== 2012 ===
2012 Alberta student vote results
Affiliation	Candidate	Votes	%
Progressive Conservative	Bev Esslinger		%
Wildrose	Don Martin		
Liberal	Alex V Bosse		%
Alberta Party	David Clark		
NDP	David Eggen		%
Total			100%

== See also ==
- List of Alberta provincial electoral districts
- Canadian provincial electoral districts
