= The Palisades, Edmonton =

The Palisades
- Area
- Location of The Palisades in Edmonton
- Coordinates: 53.618°N 113.554°W
- Country: Canada
- Province: Alberta
- City: Edmonton
- Quadrant: NW
- Ward: Anirniq

Government
  - Administrative body: Edmonton City Council
  - Councillor: Erin Rutherford
- Elevation: 685 m (2,247 ft)

The Palisades is a residential area in the northwest portion of the City of Edmonton in Alberta, Canada. It was established in 1984 through Edmonton City Council's adoption of the Palisades Area Structure Plan, which guides the overall development of the area.

== Geography ==
Located in northwest Edmonton, The Palisades is bounded by a Canadian National (CN) rail line to the west, 137 Avenue to the south, 127 Street to the east, and Anthony Henday Drive (Highway 216) to the north. The area is bisected by 153 Avenue and 167 Avenue.

The Rampart Industrial area is located beyond the CN rail line to the west, while the Wellington neighbourhood is beyond 137 Avenue to the south and the Castle Downs area is beyond 127 Street to the east. The future Goodridge Corners neighbourhood is beyond Anthony Henday Drive to the north.

== Neighbourhoods ==
The Palisades Area Structure Plan originally planned for six separate neighbourhoods. Today, the Palisades area includes the following:

- Albany;
- Carlton;
- Cumberland;
- Hudson;
- Oxford; and
- Pembina.

== Land use plans ==
In addition to The Palisades Area Structure Plan, the following plans were adopted to further guide development of certain portions of the Palisades area:

- The Albany Neighbourhood Structure Plan (NSP) in 2009, which applies to the Albany neighbourhood;
- The Carlton NSP in 1999, which applies to the Carlton neighbourhood;
- The Cumberland NSP in 1984, which applies to the Cumberland neighbourhood;
- The Hudson NSP in 1997, which applies to the Hudson neighbourhood; and
- The Oxford NSP in 1985, which applies to the Oxford neighbourhood.
