= Christie Mjolsness =

Canadian politician (born 1955)

Member of the Legislative Assembly of Alberta for Edmonton-Calder
- In office 1986–1993
- Preceded by: Lance White
- Succeeded by: district abolished

Personal details
- Born: June 29, 1955 (age 71) Edmonton, Alberta
- Party: Alberta New Democratic Party

Christine Mjolsness (born June 29, 1955) is a former provincial level politician and athlete from Alberta, Canada. She served as a member of the Legislative Assembly of Alberta from 1986 to 1993.

== Political career ==
Mjolsness ran for public office in the 1982 Alberta general election. She ran in the electoral district of Edmonton-Calder as a candidate for the New Democrats against incumbent Progressive Conservative MLA Tom Chambers but was defeated by a wide margin in a three-way race. Chambers retired and she ran for a second time in the 1986 Alberta general election this time winning the seat and picking up the district for the New Democrats. She ran for her second term in office in the 1989 Alberta general election defeating Liberal candidate Lance White and Progressive Conservative Aldo De Luca in a hotly contested three-way election. Edmonton-Calder was abolished due to redistribution for the 1993 Alberta general election. Mjolsness ran for re-election in the new electoral district of Edmonton Roper, but was defeated by Liberal candidate Sine Chadi

== Athletics ==
After her political career Mjolsness became a competitive Canoe polo player and marathon runner. She joined Team Canoe Kayak Canada and competed in 1998 at the 3rd World Canoe Polo Championships in Aveiro, Portugal. The next year she competed with Team Canada at the 1st America's Cup: Los Alamos, USA. In 2002 she competed with the Edmonton Whitewater Paddlers Open Women's Team in the 3rd Canadian National Canoe Polo Championships in Edmonton, Alberta.

In 2005 she competed in the St. Albert Fall Challenge 10 km Half Marathon. She finished 132nd overall with a time of 2:28:19. She last entered in the Sunshine Coast April Fool's Run 2007. In that race she finished 333rd place out of 415 runners overall and 15th in her age group out of 23 with a time of 2:16:06.

Legislative Assembly of Alberta
Preceded by Tom Chambers	MLA Edmonton-Calder; 1986-1993	Succeeded by Lance White
