= Edmonton-Kingsway =

Defunct provincial electoral district in Alberta, Canada

Alberta electoral district

Defunct provincial electoral district
- Legislature: Legislative Assembly of Alberta
- District created: 1971
- District abolished: 1993
- First contested: 1971
- Last contested: 1989

Edmonton-Kingsway was a provincial electoral district in Alberta, Canada, mandated to return a single member to the Legislative Assembly of Alberta using the first past the post method of voting from 1971 to 1993.

== History ==
The Edmonton-Kingsway electoral district was formed in the 1970 boundary redistribution from Edmonton North. It was abolished in the 1993 boundary redistribution and formed Edmonton-Mayfield.

=== Members of the Legislative Assembly (MLAs) ===
Members of the Legislative Assembly for Edmonton-Kingsway
Assembly	Years	Member	Party
See Edmonton North electoral district from 1959-1971
17th	1971–1975	Kenneth Paproski	Progressive Conservative
18th	1975–1979	Kenneth Paproski	Progressive Conservative
19th	1979–1982	Kenneth Paproski	Progressive Conservative
20th	1982–1986	Carl Paproski	Progressive Conservative
21st	1986–1989	Alex McEachern	New Democratic
22nd	1989–1993	Alex McEachern	New Democratic
See Edmonton-Mayfield electoral district from 1993-1997

== Election results ==
=== 1971 ===
1971 Alberta general election
Party	Candidate	Votes	%	±%
Progressive Conservative	Kenneth Paproski	6,316	55.70%	–
Social Credit	Ethel Sylvia Wilson	3,535	31.17%	–
New Democratic	Paulette Atterbury	1,290	11.38%	–
Liberal	Roderick Woodcock	199	1.75%	–
Total		11,340	–	–
Rejected, spoiled and declined		92	–	–
Eligible electors / turnout		16,597	68.88%	–
Progressive Conservative pickup new district.				
Source(s) Source: "Edmonton-Kingsway Official Results 1971 Alberta general election". Alberta Heritage Community Foundation.

=== 1975 ===
1975 Alberta general election
Party	Candidate	Votes	%	±%
Progressive Conservative	Kenneth Paproski	4,897	66.23%	10.53%
New Democratic	Jane Weaver	1,406	19.02%	7.64%
Social Credit	Jake Johnson	619	8.37%	-22.80%
Liberal	Roy Landreth	472	6.38%	4.63%
Total		7394	–	–
Rejected, spoiled and declined		30	–	–
Eligible electors / turnout		15851	46.84%	–
Progressive Conservative hold		Swing		11.35%
Source(s) Source: "Edmonton-Kingsway Official Results 1975 Alberta general election". Alberta Heritage Community Foundation.

=== 1979 ===
1979 Alberta general election
Party	Candidate	Votes	%	±%
Progressive Conservative	Kenneth Paproski	4,387	50.66%	-15.57%
New Democratic	Alex McEachern	2,563	29.60%	10.58%
Social Credit	Martin Hattersley	975	11.26%	2.89%
Liberal	Dorothy A. Richardson	684	7.90%	1.51%
Independent	Eddie Keehn	51	0.59%	–
Total		8,660	–	–
Rejected, spoiled and declined		N/A	–	–
Eligible electors / turnout		16,847	51.40%	–
Progressive Conservative hold		Swing		-13.08%
Source(s) Source: "Edmonton-Kingsway Official Results 1979 Alberta general election". Alberta Heritage Community Foundation.

=== 1982 ===
1982 Alberta general election
Party	Candidate	Votes	%	±%
Progressive Conservative	Carl Paproski	4,294	41.68%	-8.98%
New Democratic	Alex McEachern	3,879	37.65%	8.06%
Independent	Mark Byington	950	9.22%	8.63%
Western Canada Concept	Curtis Long	669	6.49%	–
Liberal	Bill Broad	318	3.09%	-4.81%
Social Credit	George Klimiuk	192	1.86%	-9.39%
Total		10,302	–	–
Rejected, spoiled and declined		16	–	–
Eligible electors / turnout		16,375	63.01%	–
Progressive Conservative hold		Swing		-8.52%
Source(s) Source: "Edmonton-Kingsway Official Results 1982 Alberta general election". Alberta Heritage Community Foundation.

=== 1986 ===
1986 Alberta general election
Party	Candidate	Votes	%	±%
New Democratic	Alex McEachern	4,669	51.12%	13.46%
Progressive Conservative	Allen Wasnea	3,491	38.22%	-3.46%
Liberal	Patrick Reid	896	9.81%	6.72%
Heritage Party	Bowden John Zachara	78	0.85%	–
Total		9,134	–	–
Rejected, spoiled and declined		17	–	–
Eligible electors / turnout		17,591	52.02%	–
New Democratic gain from Progressive Conservative		Swing		4.43%
Source(s) Source: "Edmonton-Kingsway Official Results 1986 Alberta general election". Alberta Heritage Community Foundation.

=== 1989 ===
1989 Alberta general election
Party	Candidate	Votes	%	±%
New Democratic	Alex McEachern	4,314	44.40%	-6.72%
Progressive Conservative	Allen Wasnea	2,818	29.00%	-9.22%
Liberal	Joan Cowling	2,585	26.60%	16.79%
Total		9,717	–	–
Rejected, spoiled and declined		26	–	–
Eligible electors / turnout		17,238	56.52%	–
New Democratic hold		Swing		1.25%
Source(s) Source: "Edmonton-Kingsway Official Results 1989 Alberta general election". Alberta Heritage Community Foundation.

== See also ==
- List of Alberta provincial electoral districts
- Canadian provincial electoral districts
- Kingsway, a road and area in Edmonton
