= Tom Chambers (politician) =

Canadian politician (1928–2018)

Member of the Legislative Assembly of Alberta for Edmonton-Calder
- In office August 30, 1971 – May 8, 1986
- Preceded by: Riding Established
- Succeeded by: Christie Mjolsness

Minister of Housing and Public Works
- In office April 24, 1978 – November 1982
- Preceded by: William Yurko
- Succeeded by: Larry Shaben

Minister of Public Works, Supply, and Services
- In office November 1982 – May 1986
- Succeeded by: Ernie Isley

Personal details
- Born: July 7, 1928 Port Arthur, Ontario, Canada
- Died: June 23, 2018 (aged 89) Edmonton, Alberta, Canada
- Party: Progressive Conservative

Thomas William Chambers (July 7, 1928 – June 23, 2018) was a provincial level politician from Alberta, Canada. He served as a member of the Legislative Assembly of Alberta from 1971 to 1986. During his time in office he served as a member of the Executive Council of Alberta serving various portfolios from 1978 to 1986.

== Political career ==
Chambers ran for a seat to the Alberta Legislature for the first time in the 1971 Alberta general election. He won the new electoral district of Edmonton-Calder defeating incumbent Social Credit MLA Edgar Gerhart to pick up the electoral district for the Progressive Conservative party. The win would help the Progressive Conservatives form government in that election.

Chambers ran for a second term in office in the 1975 Alberta general election. Despite Chambers losing a small portion of his popular vote, the opposition candidates running against him would see a significant vote drop, he was returned to office easily. Premier Peter Lougheed would appoint Chambers to his first ministerial portfolio on April 24, 1978. He served the remainder of his second term as Minister of Housing and Public Works. Chambers ran for re-election to a third term in the 1979 general election. Despite holding a ministerial portfolio his popular vote dropped for the second straight election. After the election he kept his portfolio for a second term.

The 1982 Alberta general election would see Chambers win a significant increase in his popular vote, he would easily score the best popular vote of his political career. The opposition vote coalesced around New Democratic candidate Christie Mjolsness, forcing a hotly contested three-way race. After the election the Housing portion of his portfolio was split off and Chambers became Minister of Public Works, Supply, and Services. He would continue hold that portfolio after Don Getty became Premier in 1985. Chambers retired from provincial politics at dissolution of the Assembly in 1986. He died on June 23, 2018, just short of his 90th birthday.
