= Alex McEachern =

Canadian politician

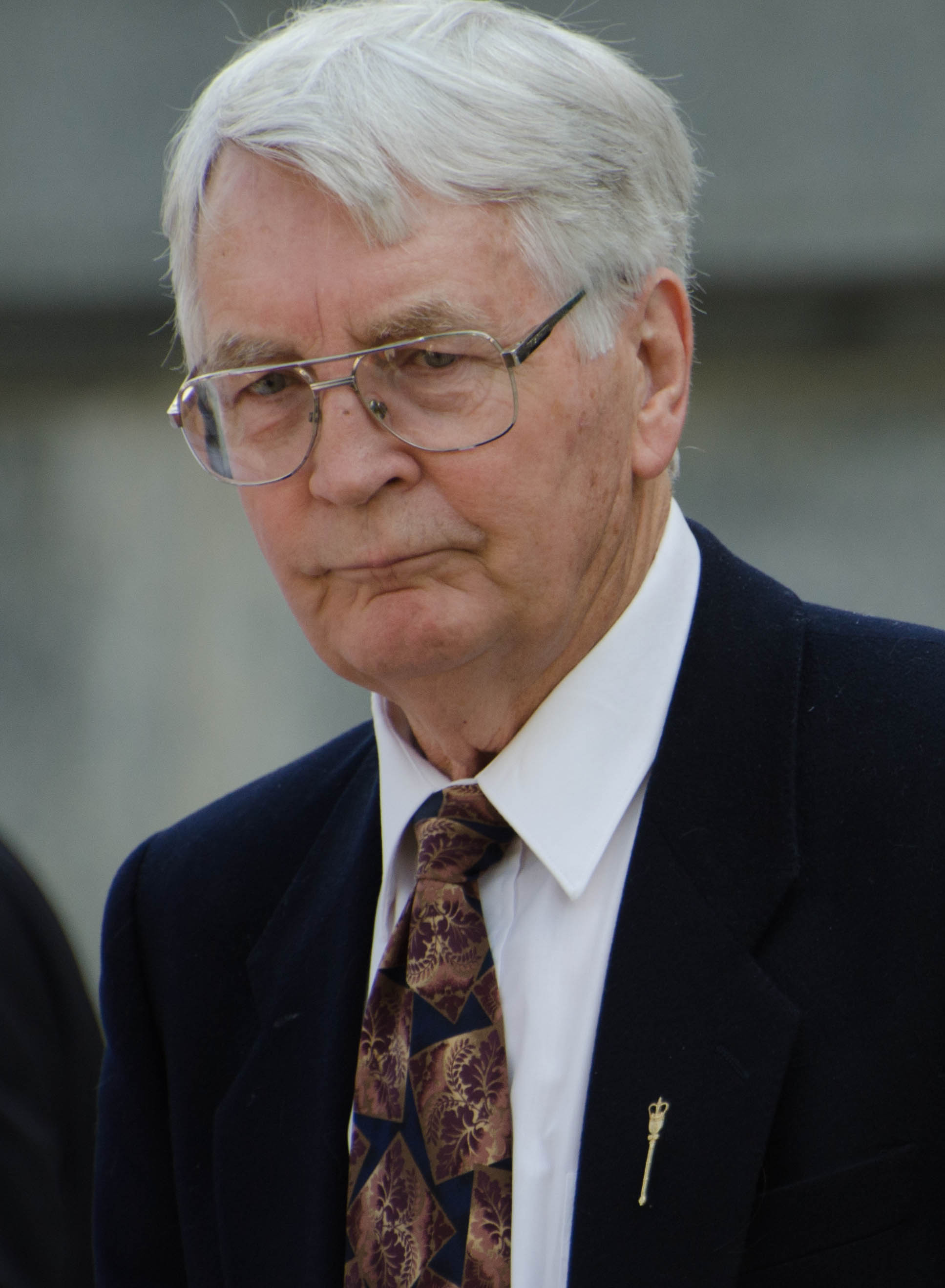
- McEachern in May 2015

MLA for Edmonton-Kingsway
- In office 1986–1993
- Preceded by: Carl Paproski
- Succeeded by: District Abolished

Personal details
- Born: September 27, 1939 Hinton Trail, Alberta, Canada
- Died: August 2025 (aged 85)
- Party: Alberta New Democratic Party
- Spouse: Ethne Bartley (m. 1964; died 2019)
- Education: University of Alberta
- Profession: Teacher

Alexander Duncan McEachern (September 27, 1939 – August 2025) was a Canadian politician from the province of Alberta. He served as a member of the Legislative Assembly of Alberta from 1986 to 1993.

== Early life and education ==
McEachern was born at Hinton Trail, Alberta on September 27, 1939, the son of lan Sylvestor and Isabella Emily Jane (née Karr) McEachern. He attended the University of Alberta where he earned Bachelor of Arts (1972) and Bachelor of Education (1965) degrees. He was a teacher by profession. In 1964, he married Ethne Bartley.

== Political career ==
McEachern ran for political office for the first time in the 1975 Alberta general election. He ran in the electoral district of Edmonton-Glenora as a candidate for the New Democrats but was badly defeated by incumbent cabinet minister Lou Hyndman.

He made a second attempt to run for office in the 1979 general election in the Edmonton-Kingsway electoral district. This time he finished second to incumbent Progressive Conservative MLA Kenneth Paproski. He attempted a third run for office in the 1982 Alberta general election with another second-place finish slightly improving his vote total to Progressive Conservative candidate Carl Paproski.

McEachern won his fourth attempt for public office, defeating three other candidates in the 1986 Alberta general election. He was re-elected for a second and final term in the 1989 Alberta general election. His majority was reduced. but he still defeated the other two candidates with a comfortable margin. Edmonton-Kingsway was abolished due to redistribution in 1993. McEachern ran in the new electoral district of Edmonton-Mayfield for the 1993 Alberta general election. He was defeated by Liberal candidate Lance White.

== Later life and death ==
McEachern continued to be active in his later years with the Alberta New Democrats, serving as the President of the Lesser Slave Lake electoral district in the 2004. His wife, Ethne died in 2019.

McEachern's death at the age of 85 was announced by Alberta NDP leader Naheed Nenshi in August 2025.
