= 1993 Alberta general election =

- June 15, 1993

83 seats in the Legislative Assembly of Alberta 42 seats needed for a majority
- Turnout: 60.21%
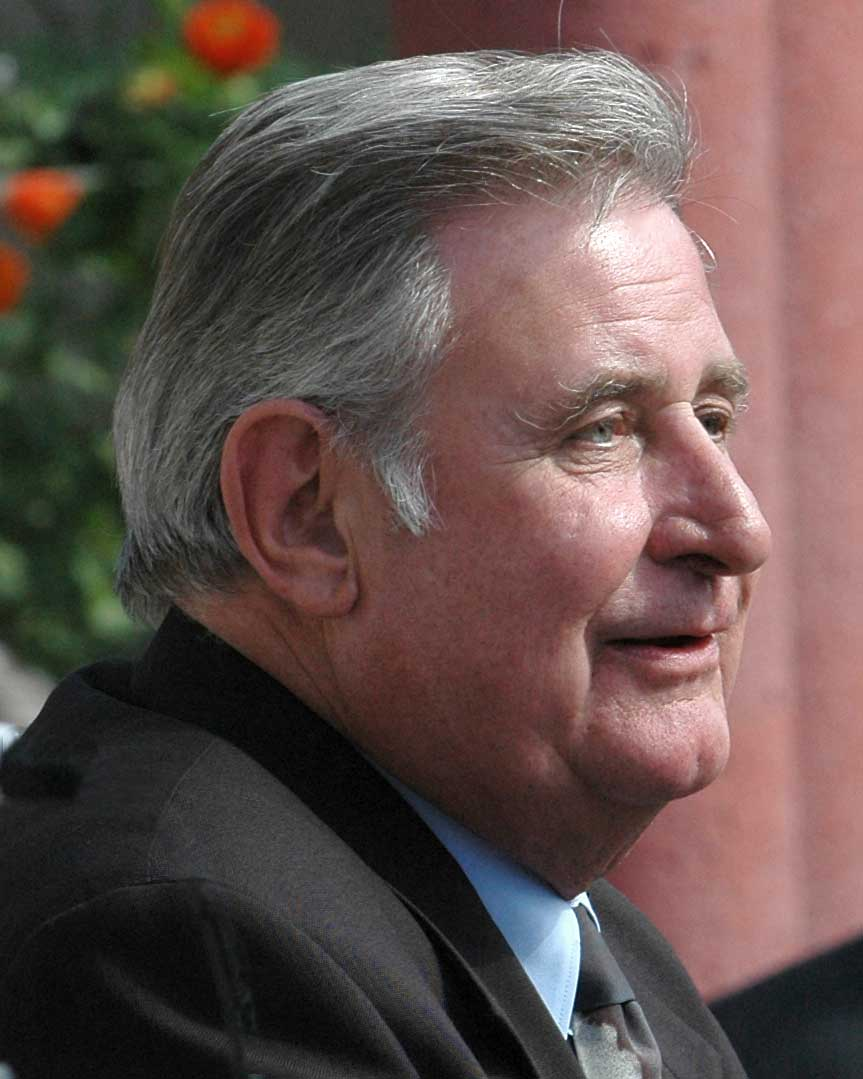

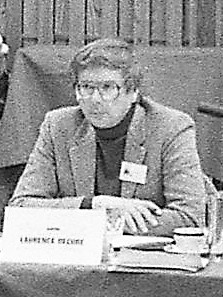

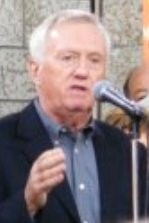
	Majority party	Minority party	Third party
Leader	Ralph Klein	Laurence Decore	Ray Martin
Party	Progressive Conservative	Liberal	New Democratic
Leader since	December 14, 1992	October 9, 1988	November 10, 1984
Leader's seat	Calgary-Elbow	Edmonton-Glengarry	Edmonton-Norwood (lost re-election)
Last election	59 seats, 44.3%	8 seats, 28.7%	16 seats, 26.3%
Seats before	59	8	16
Seats won	51	32	0
Seat change	▼8	▲24	▼16
Popular vote	439,981	392,899	108,883
Percentage	44.5%	39.7%	11.0%
Swing	▲0.2%	▲11.0%	▼15.3%
Premier before election
Ralph Klein
Progressive Conservative
Premier after election
Ralph Klein
Progressive Conservative

The 1993 Alberta general election was held on June 15, 1993, to elect members of the Legislative Assembly of Alberta. The Conservative government was re-elected, taking 51 seats out of 83 (61 per cent of the seats) but only having support of 45 per cent of voters.

It is notable because it was seen by some as a contest between the former mayors of Calgary and Edmonton, Ralph Klein and Laurence Decore, respectively.

Until the government's defeat in 2015, this election was the closest the Progressive Conservatives came to losing since coming to power in 1971.

== Background ==
In 1992, the Liberal Party was led by Laurence Decore, a former mayor of Edmonton. Despite being the smallest of the three parties in the legislature, the Liberals made major gains by shifting to the political right and criticizing the Conservatives' fiscal responsibility, the province's rapidly rising debt, and the government's involvement in the private sector which resulted in some companies defaulting on government loans.

In September 1992, Don Getty resigned as provincial premier and leader of the Progressive Conservative Party, after polls showed that he would not win re-election, with the party's image being hurt by a perceived lack of fiscal responsibility, the in-fighting that resulted from an attempt to force a leadership review after Getty was defeated in his own riding at the previous election, and a backlash to the unpopular federal Progressive Conservative government of Brian Mulroney. The party membership elected Environment Minister and former Calgary mayor Ralph Klein to succeed Getty. Klein campaigned for the leadership in part by making arguments similar to Decore's. He favoured a near-immediate balancing of the provincial budget and rapid debt repayment thereafter, and declared his government "out of the business of business". By the time Klein dropped the writs, his party had regained the lead on polls.

The election was fought on a new series of electoral boundaries based on the census of 1991, drawn by a committee composed only of Progressive Conservative MLAs led by Bob Bogle, with no input from opposition parties. The new electoral map drew criticism from the Alberta Court of Appeal in 1994 because the committee gave no justification for creating four districts well below average population, one of which was Bogle's own riding of Taber-Warner.

== Campaign ==
During the general election campaign, Klein promoted the significant changes that he had made during his time of Premier, distancing the Conservatives from Getty's past administration. Decore, facing a Premier with whom he agreed on many issues, argued that the Progressive Conservative party had no moral authority left on the issues on which Klein was campaigning.

There were several televised debates, however viewership was low since it coincided with the 1993 Stanley Cup Final.

The campaign coincided with a leadership election for the federal Progressive Conservatives, after Mulroney announced his resignation as party leader earlier in the year. Vancouver-based MP and cabinet member Kim Campbell quickly became the firm favourite to win, revitalizing the party's flagging popularity in the west, and meaning that Mulroney's unpopularity no longer proved a millstone for the provincial Progressive Conservatives. Campbell would be elected as federal party leader two days before polling day in Alberta, giving the provincial party a last-minute boost; she would, ironically, lead the federal party to a crushing defeat that saw them completely wiped out in Western Canada during the federal election later that year.

== Election ==
Klein's efforts were seen as successful in reinvigorating the Conservatives from certain defeat just under a year earlier. Ending up, they retained a solid majority in the legislature for its seventh consecutive term in government. The Conservatives actually managed to increase their share of the popular vote marginally, although they lost eight seats in the legislature since the vote was not as evenly split as it had been four years earlier. Notably, the PC's were shut out of Edmonton for the first time since 1963, but managed to make gains in Klein's hometown of Calgary where they won all but three seats.

The Liberals capitalized on the stagnant PC vote and the collapse of the New Democratic Party vote from 26% to 11%. As opposition to the PC government coalesced around Decore and the Liberals, they won almost 40% of the popular vote and 32 seats in the legislature, including every seat in Edmonton. They formed what was the largest opposition caucus in Alberta history, eventually succeeded by Rachel Notley’s New Democratic Party opposition after the 2023 election. To the surprise of many, Decore stepped down as Liberal leader not long after the election, supposedly being pressured to resign by party insiders who felt that he had missed the party's best chance in over 70 years to form government. Decore's decision was also motivated by two battles against cancer in the preceding three years, which had seriously affected his health; he would ultimately be diagnosed for a third time a few years later, and died in 1999.

Ray Martin's New Democrats, previously the official opposition, were shut out of the legislature altogether for the first time since 1967. All of their seats in Edmonton — including Martin's — were lost to the Liberals, due to the popularity of Decore there. Martin suggested that tactical voting was to blame as well, as the anti-PC vote consolidated around the Liberals.

The Social Credit Party, which had been largely moribund for the previous decade after governing the province from 1935 to 1971, would experience a minor comeback under new leader Randy Thorsteinson, who positioned the party as the de facto provincial branch of the Reform Party of Canada, which was led by Preston Manning, son of former Alberta premier Ernest Manning, and enjoying considerable support in Western Canada. Campbell's election as leader of the federal Progressive Conservatives would see them enjoy a temporary resurgence of popularity that stalled Reform's, and thereby Social Credit's momentum, though the 2.4% of the popular vote earned by the latter was credited for bringing them back from the verge of extinction.

== Results ==
Overall voter turnout was 60.21%.

=== Overall results ===

Party	Votes			Seats	
Progressive Conservative	439,981	44.5%	▲0.2%	51 / 83 (61%)	▼8
Liberal	392,899	39.7%	▲11.1%	32 / 83 (39%)	▲24

=== Detailed results ===
Party	Party leader	candidates	Seats			Popular vote		
Party	Party leader	candidates	1989	Elected	% Change	#	%	% Change
Progressive Conservative	Ralph Klein	83	59	51	-13.6%	439,981	44.49%	+0.20%
Liberal	Laurence Decore	83	8	32	+300%	392,899	39.73%	+11.05%
New Democrats	Ray Martin	83	16	-	-100%	108,883	11.01%	-15.28%
Social Credit	Randy Thorsteinson	39	-	-	-	23,885	2.41%	+1.94%
Independent		21	-	-	-	9,214	0.93%	+0.67%
Natural Law	Maury Shapka	45	*	-	*	5,017	0.51%	*
Confederation of Regions	Ray Young	12	*	-	*	3,556	0.36%	*
Alliance	Mark Waters	4	*	-	*	3,548	0.36%	*
Green	Betty Paschen	11	*	-	*	1,995	0.20%	*
Communist	Naomi Rankin	1	-	-	-	47	x	-0.01%
Total		382	83	83	-	989,025	100%	
Source: Elections Alberta

Notes:

* Party did not nominate candidates in the previous election.

x – less than 0.005% of the popular vote

Popular vote
PC	44.49%
Liberal	39.73%
New Democratic	11.01%
Social Credit	2.41%
Others	2.36%

Seats summary
PC	61.45%
Liberal	38.55%

== Results by riding ==
Electoral district	Candidates					Incumbent
Electoral district	PC	Liberal	NDP	Social Credit	Other	Incumbent
Athabasca-Wabasca	Mike Cardinal; 4,144; 59.72%	Simon Waquan; 1,921; 27.68%	Emil Zachkewich; 843; 12.15%			New riding
Banff-Cochrane	Brian Evans; 6,552; 52.43%	Paula Andrews; 4,183; 33.47%	Cindy McCallum; 1,048; 8.39%		Brian L. Horejsi (Ind.); 607; 4.86% Ginger (V.M.) Sheets-Revitt (Nat. Law); 77; 0.62%	Brian Evans
Barrhead-Westlock	Kenneth R. Kowalski; 6,312; 54.92%	Dale Greig; 3,309; 28.79%	Harold E. Wharton; 1,076; 9.36%	Dale W. Harris; 561; 4.88%	Adam Hauch (C.o.R.); 143; 1.25% Leonard Stahl (Ind.); 67; 0.58%	
Bonnyville	Ernie Isley; 4,222; 45.44%	Leo Vasseur; 4,364; 46.97%	Agathe Gaulin; 666; 7.17%			Ernie Isley
Bow Valley	Lyle Oberg; 5,403; 61.13%	Peter Hansen; 2,424; 27.43%	Richard Knutson; 558; 6.31%	Reuban Huber; 436; 4.93%		Tom N. Musgrove
Calgary-Bow	Bonnie Laing; 7,011; 46.10%	Rob Van Walleghem; 5,369; 35.30%	Anne McGrath; 1,908; 12.55%	Patrick John Hudson; 376; 2.47%	David Crowe (Green); 287; 1.89% Roberta McDonald (C.o.R.); 120; 0.79% Alan Livingston (Nat. Law); 78; 0.51%	Bonnie Laing
Calgary-Buffalo	Steven Yu; 4,313; 40.41%	Gary Dickson; 4,826; 45.22%	Israel Lachovsky; 1,062; 9.95%		Rebecca Matiowsky (Green); 212; 2.00% Ralph Holt (Nat. Law); 185; 1.73%	Gary Dickson
Calgary-Cross	Yvonne Fritz; 6,449; 59.56%	Keith Hart; 3,576; 33.03%	Vinay Dey; 686; 6.34%		Neeraj Varma (Nat. Law); 86; 0.79%	
Calgary-Currie	Jocelyn Burgener; 6,699; 47.72%	Mairi Matheson; 4,670; 33.26%	Ilona Boyce; 1,426; 10.16%		Mark Waters (All.); 1,200; 8.57%	Dennis L. Anderson
Calgary-East	Moe Amery; 5,503; 54.30%	Dale Muti; 1,689; 16.67%	Barry Pashak; 2,306; 22.75%	Lera G. Shirley; 366; 3.61%	Alain Horchower (Ind.); 237; 2.34%	
Calgary-Egmont	Denis Herard; 9,846; 57.94%	Dick Nichols; 5,332; 31.38%	Ken Sahil; 1,063; 6.26%		Les Kaluzny (All.); 543; 3.21% Linda Fritz (Nat. Law); 156; 0.92%	David John Carter
Calgary-Elbow	Ralph Klein; 10,061; 57.94%	Madeleine King; 6,142; 35.37%	Eileen Clancy Teslenko; 617; 3.55%	Steve Tobler; 312; 1.80%	Miel S.R. Gabriel (Ind.); 101; 0.58% Bruce Hansen (Nat. Law); 85; 0.49%	Ralph Klein
Calgary-Fish Creek	Heather Forsyth; 7,855; 54.58%	Marie Cameron; 5,346; 37.15%	Kerin Spaargaren; 558; 3.88%		Roy Carey (Ind.); 544; 3.78% Darlene Holt (Nat. Law); 70; 0.49%	William Edward Payne
Calgary-Foothills	Patricia Black; 8,129; 52.71%	Frances Wright; 6,146; 39.85%	Don McMillan; 965; 6.26%		Anna Novikov (Nat. Law); 155; 1.01%	Patricia Black
Calgary-Glenmore	Dianne Mirosh; 7,972; 48.54%	Brendan Dunphy; 7,064; 43.01%	Noreen Murphy; 603; 3.67%	Stuart van der Lee; 545; 3.32%	Sol Candel (Green); 147; 0.90% John Vrskovy (Nat. Law); 61; 0.37%	Dianne Mirosh
Calgary-Lougheed	Jim Dinning; 7,280; 52.70%	Jack Driscoll; 5,803; 42.01%	Catherine Rose; 502; 3.63%		Peter Hope (C.o.R.); 122; 0.88% Ida Bugmann (Nat. Law); 88; 0.64%	
Calgary-McCall	Harry Sohal; 4,118; 44.69%	A. Giga; 2,921; 31.70%	Sylvia Lilley; 900; 9.77%		Brian R. Newman (Ind.); 1,066; 11.57% Allen Maclennan (C.o.R.); 129; 1.41% Maureen Doram (Nat. Law); 55; 0.60%	Stanley Kenneth Nelson
Calgary-Montrose	Hung Pham; 4,866; 48.01%	Keong Yap; 2,592; 25.57%	Jean Munn; 1,970; 19.44%		Blaine Desjardine (Ind.); 613; 6.05% Chris Deluce (Nat. Law); 68; 0.67%	Rick Orman
Calgary-Mountain View	Mark Hlady; 5,768; 46.07%	Jonathan Horlick; 2,791; 22.29%	Robert Andrew Hawkesworth; 3,255; 26.00%	George Clark; 481; 3.84%	Bruce Jackman (C.o.R.); 116; 0.93% Alberta Scraba (Nat. Law); 71; 0.57%	Robert Andrew Hawkesworth
Calgary-North Hill	Richard Charles Magnus; 6,756; 49.87%	Tom Dixon; 4,262; 31.46%	Wendy Charlton; 1,935; 14.28%		Michael O'Malley (Ind.); 394; 2.91%Joyce Gregson (Nat. Law); 160; 1.18%	Frederick Alan Stewart
Calgary-North West	Harley Torgerson; 6,443; 45.37%	Frank Bruseker; 6,763; 47.62%	Paul George Rasporich; 495; 3.49%	David Grant; 373; 2.63%	Paul Colver (Nat. Law); 110; 0.77%	Frank Bruseker
Calgary-Nose Creek	Gary Mar; 6,974; 53.53%	Yolande Gagnon; 5,057; 38.81%	Albert Sole; 789; 6.06%		Ray Harris (Nat. Law); 176; 1.35%	
Calgary-Shaw	Jonathan Niles Havelock; 9,328; 62.24%	Bill Walker; 4,963; 33.11%	Jason Ness; 526; 3.51%		Ken Nielsen (Nat. Law); 136; 0.91%	Jim Dinning
Calgary-Varsity	Murray D. Smith; 8,520; 47.75%	Carrol Jaques; 6,860; 38.45%	Sharon Kimmel; 1,785; 10.00%		Mike Sawyer (Green); 531; 2.98% Santo Esposito (Nat. Law); 99; 0.55%	
Calgary-West	Ron Leigh; 6,532; 44.29%	Danny Dalla-Longa; 6,927; 46.97%	Nabil (Ben) Hantes; 584; 3.96%	Sharon Whitehead; 548; 3.72%	Phil Morin (Nat. Law); 135; 0.92%	Elaine McCoy
Cardston-Chief Mountain	Jack Ady; 3,345; 69.05%	Bruce A. Jackson; 1,326; 27.37%	Larry Zima; 163; 3.36%			
Chinook	Shirley McClellan; 4,748; 64.85%	Dianne Anderson; 1,015; 13.86%	Steven Milner; 223; 3.05%	Gus Mattheis; 1,025; 14.00%	Kristopher Dietrich (Ind.); 293; 4.00%	Shirley McClellan
Clover Bar-Fort Saskatchewan	Rob Splane; 4,816; 35.97%	Muriel Abdurahman; 5,612; 41.91%	W.H. (Skip) Gordon; 2,072; 15.47%		Kurt Gesell (Ind.); 872; 6.51%	
Cypress-Medicine Hat	Lorne Taylor; 4,034; 49.11%	Lloyd B. Robinson; 2,799; 34.07%	James Ridley; 494; 6.01%	Al Strom; 855; 10.41%		
Drayton Valley-Calmar	Tom Thurber; 5,261; 50.98%	Brad Janishewski; 3,001; 29.08%	Dolly Brown; 768; 7.44%	Ed White; 1,133; 10.98%	Keith Burger (Nat. Law); 138; 1.34%	
Drumheller	Stan Schumacher; 7,421; 62.76%	Roger Nelson; 2,457; 20.78%	Steve Osborne; 1,463; 12.37%		David McAndrews (C.o.R.); 454; 3.85%	Stan Schumacher
Dunvegan	Glen Clegg; 4,650; 45.89%	Hartmann Nagel; 4,347; 42.90%	Sheila Maxwell-Marks; 1,100; 10.86%			Glen Clegg
Edmonton-Avonmore	Ken Alyuila; 3,433; 26.82%	Gene Zwozdesky; 6,728; 52.56%	Marie Laing; 2,190; 17.11%	Leslie M. Jackson; 285; 2.23%	Dennis Clark (Green); 97; 0.76% Lucia Hoff (Nat. Law); 40; 0.31%	Marie Laing
Edmonton-Beverly-Belmont	Brian Hlus; 3,060; 28.68%	Julius E. Yankowsky; 5,037; 47.22%	Ed W. Ewasiuk; 2,473; 23.18%		Ria Kinzel (Nat. Law); 91; 0.85%	
Edmonton-Centre	John Wheelwright; 3,418; 28.66%	Michael Henry; 5,656; 47.43%	Kay Hurtig; 2,343; 19.65%	Wes Warren; 202; 1.69%	Richard Johnsen (Nat. Law); 95; 0.80%	William Roberts
Edmonton-Ellerslie	Bas Roopnarine; 2,116; 20.71%	Debby Carlson; 5,466; 53.49%	Gerry Gibeault; 2,144; 20.98%	Ken Way; 398; 3.90%	Rhonda Day (Nat. Law); 79; 0.77%	
Edmonton-Glengarry	Don Clarke; 2,669; 23.28%	Laurence Decore; 7,548; 65.84%	Greg Reimer; 1,088; 9.49%		Linda Sikora (Nat. Law); 118; 1.03%	Laurence Decore
Edmonton-Glenora	Gwen Harris; 5,150; 33.31%	Howard Sapers; 7,745; 50.10%	Arlene Young; 1,874; 12.12%	Trevor Blinston; 301; 1.95%	Pat Nelson (C.o.R.) 231; 1.50% Paula Johnsen (Nat. Law); 122; 0.79%	Nancy Betkowski
Edmonton-Gold Bar	John Szumlas; 4,721; 26.30%	Bettie Hewes; 10,605; 59.07%	Lorraine Crawford; 1,820; 10.14%	David H. Friesen; 516; 2.87%	David J. Parker (Green); 165; 0.92% Roni Shapka (Nat. Law); 90; 0.50%	Bettie Hewes
Edmonton-Highlands-Beverly	Ron Liepert; 2,787; 24.42%	Alice Hanson; 5,189; 45.46%	John McInnis; 2,885; 25.28%	Tim Friesen; 428; 3.75%	Cliff Kinzel (Nat. Law); 94; 0.82%	
Edmonton-Manning	Tony Kallal; 2,521; 21.45%	Peter Sekulic; 6,007; 51.11%	Thomas Sigurdson; 2,904; 24.71%	George Grant; 296; 2.52%		
Edmonton-Mayfield	Lynn Faulder; 3,635; 26.90%	Lance D. White; 6,495; 48.06%	Alex McEachern; 3,173; 23.48%		Annie Anderson (Nat. Law); 181; 1.34%	
Edmonton-McClung	Henry Mah; 4,177; 29.69%	Grant Mitchell; 8,931; 63.48%	Denis Gautier-Villon; 799; 5.68%		Pat Simpson (Nat. Law); 125; 0.89%	
Edmonton-Meadowlark	Laurie Pushor; 3,978; 31.10%	Karen Leibovici; 7,215; 56.40%	William A. (Bill) Mullen; 1,111; 8.68%	Norm Case; 354; 2.77%	Margo Cochlan (Nat. Law); 110; 0.86%	Grant Mitchell
Edmonton-Mill Woods	W. Bill Pidruchney; 2,556; 26.85%	Don Massey; 5,330; 55.98%	Laat Bhinder; 1,007; 10.58%	Robert J. Alford; 414; 4.35%	Ken Kozak (Ind.); 102; 1.07% Raymond Boyko (Green); 46; 0.48% Mary D. Romach (Nat. Law); 44; 0.46%	Gerry Gibeault
Edmonton-Norwood	Fay Orr; 2,517; 21.68%	Andrew Beniuk; 4,944; 42.58%	Ray Martin; 3,749; 32.29%	Alan Cruikshank; 264; 2.27%	Maury Shapka (Nat. Law); 88; 0.76%	Ray Martin
Edmonton-Roper	John Belzerowski; 2,828; 25.30%	Sine Chadi; 5,872; 52.53%	Christie Mjolsness; 2,362; 21.13%		Allan Gwynn (Nat. Law); 95; 0.85%	
Edmonton-Rutherford	Brenda Platzer; 4,283; 29.77%	Percy Wickman; 8,583; 59.65%	Olive Dickason; 969; 6.73%	David Wozney; 398; 2.77%	Wade McKinley (Nat. Law); 66; 0.46% Myles Evely (Green); 64; 0.44%	
Edmonton-Strathcona	Don Grimble; 4,071; 24.43%	Al Zariwny; 6,542; 39.26%	Barrie Chivers; 5,121; 30.73%	Patrick D. Ellis; 460; 2.76%	Elizabeth Paschen (Green); 253; 1.52% E. Benjamin Toane (Nat. Law); 108; 0.65% Naomi J. Rankin (Comm.); 47; 0.28%	Gordon S.B. Wright/Barrie Chivers (1991-)
Edmonton-Whitemud	David Hancock; 5,351; 36.18%	Mike Percy; 8,628; 58.34%	Daniel Aitken; 648; 4.38%		Robert Wilde (Green); 73; 0.49% Richard Shelford (Nat. Law); 63; 0.43%	Percy Wickman
Fort McMurray	Connie Macrae; 2,738; 27.22%	Adam Germain; 4,261; 42.36%	Ann Dort-Maclean; 1,483; 14.74%		Wendell Maceachern (Ind.); 1,563; 15.54%	Norman A. Weiss
Grande Prairie-Smoky	Walter Paszkowski; 4,942; 54.97%	John A. Croken; 2,506; 27.88%	Christine Potts; 1,199; 13.34%		Herb Wohlgemuth (C.o.R.); 329; 3.67%	
Grande Prairie-Wapiti	Wayne Jacques; 4,457; 47.89%	Dwight Logan; 3,942; 42.36%	Trish Wright; 880; 9.46%			
Highwood	Don Tannas; 8,063; 64.77%	Rusti-Ann Blanke; 3,159; 25.38%	Marg Elliot; 504; 4.05%	John Bergen; 701; 5.63%		Don Tannas
Innisfail-Sylvan Lake	Gary Severtson; 5,660; 53.48%	Daryl J. Beck; 2,294; 21.67%	Reg Stotz; 544; 5.14%	Norm Bjornson; 520; 4.91%	George Flake (Alliance); 1,381; 13.08% Len Scott (Ind.); 163; 1.54%	
Lac La Biche-St. Paul	John Trefanenko; 3,897; 39.11%	Paul Langevin; 5,041; 50.59%	Eugene P. Houle; 999; 10.03%			
Lacombe-Stettler	Judy Gordon; 6,596; 57.71%	Ed Whiteside; 3,001; 26.26%	Rolf Pritchard; 730; 6.39%	R. Ryan Handley; 687; 6.01%	Douglas R. Chitwood (Ind.); 397; 3.47%	
Leduc	Donald H. Sparrow; 5,884; 42.87%	Terry Kirkland; 6,823; 49.71%	Jeff Lambert; 812; 5.92%		Larry Bogart (Nat. Law); 192; 1.40%	
Lesser Slave Lake	Pearl M. Calahasen; 4,260; 55.30%	Denise C. Wahlstrom; 3,093; 40.15%	Larry Sakaluk; 326; 4.23%			Pearl M. Calahasen
Lethbridge-East	Patricia A. (Pat) Bunn; 5,092; 39.86%	Ken Nicol; 6,114; 47.86%	Larry Conley; 1,495; 11.70%			Archibald Dick Johnston
Lethbridge-West	Clint Dunford; 4,643; 41.73%	Michael Dietrich; 4,534; 40.76%	Jacqueline Preyde; 973; 8.75%		Jason Kempt (Ind.); 926; 8.32%	John Gogo
Little Bow	Barry McFarland; 6,709; 67.07%	Donna L. Graham; 2,886; 28.85%	Rod Lachmuth; 382; 3.82%			Raymond Albert Speaker
Medicine Hat	Rob Renner; 4,941; 38.90%	Garth Vallely; 4,790; 37.71%	Bob Wanner; 2,366; 18.63%	Marcel Guay; 568; 4.47%		James Horsman
Olds-Didsbury	Roy Brassard; 8,383; 61.48%	Donna Gole; 3,378; 24.77%	Ruth Scott; 355; 2.60%	Derry H. Macfarlane; 815; 5.98%	Dennis Combs (C.o.R.); 683; 5.02%	Roy Brassard
Peace River	Gary Friedel; 3,156; 43.23%	Elmer Cardinal; 2,402; 32.90%	Brian Dewar; 1,192; 16.33%		Ed Kary (C.o.R.); 526; 7.23%	Al (Boomer) Adair
Pincher Creek-Macleod	David Coutts; 4,843; 45.33%	Ernie Patterson; 4,231; 39.60%	Mike Dawson; 930; 8.70%		Susan Aris (Ind.); 640; 5.99%	
Ponoka-Rimbey	Halvar C. Jonson; 5,977; 63.48%	Bernice Luce; 1,841; 19.55%	Doug Hart; 747; 7.93%		Harold Kenney (C.o.R.); 585; 6.23% Robert (Bob) Hodgins (Ind.); 240; 2.55%	Halvar C. Jonson
Red Deer-North	Stockwell Day; 5,402; 55.44%	Tony Connelly; 2,888; 29.64%	Linda Kaiser-Putzenberger; 762; 7.82%	Michael Roth; 559; 5.74%	Katherine Fisher (Nat. Law); 104; 1.07%	Stockwell Day
Red Deer-South	Victor Doerksen; 5,663; 46.42%	Don Sinclair; 4,879; 40.00%	Malcolm Reville; 639; 5.24%	Randy Thorsteinson; 882; 7.23%	Ken Arnold (Nat. Law); 116; 0.95%	John Oldring
Redwater	Steve Zarusky; 4,582; 36.55%	Nicholas Taylor; 6,429; 51.29%	Robert J. Tomkins; 1,306; 10.42%		Geoff Toane (Nat. Law); 196; 1.56%	
Rocky Mountain House	Ty Lund; 5,192; 55.69%	Roxanne V. Prior; 1,181; 12.67%	Drew Ludington; 604; 6.48%	Lavern J. Ahlstrom; 2,330; 24.99%		Ty Lund
Sherwood Park	Doug Fulford; 6,704; 40.31%	Bruce Collingwood; 7,798; 46.89%	Jim Gurnett; 1,955; 11.76%		Lorne Hoff (Nat. Law); 147; 0.88%	Peter Elzinga
Spruce Grove-Sturgeon-St. Albert	Norm Kluthe; 4,428; 39.53%	Colleen Soetaert; 5,811; 51.87%	Steve Jacobs; 813; 7.26%		Randy T. Fritz (Nat. Law); 132; 1.18%	
St. Albert	Dick Fowler; 5,746; 40.27%	Len Bracko; 7,267; 50.94%	John Booth; 1,031; 7.23%		Gordon C. Rever (Nat. Law); 199; 1.39%	Dick Fowler
Stony Plain	Stan Woloshyn; 4,855; 41.27%	Albert Schatzke; 4,607; 39.16%	Laurence Johnson; 1,481; 12.59%	Gary Morton; 674; 5.73%	Lois Burger (Nat. Law); 133; 1.13%	Stan Woloshyn
Taber-Warner	Ron Hierath; 5,544; 59.72%	Doug Blatter; 2,723; 29.33%	Charlie Bryant; 433; 4.66%	Ken Rose; 564; 6.07%		Robert Bogle
Three Hills-Airdrie	Carol Louise Haley; 5,666; 51.09%	Don MacDonald; 3,783; 34.11%	Gordon Twigg; 553; 4.99%	Peter Smits; 517; 4.66%	George Shenton (Alliance); 424; 3.83; Lawrence Lein (C.o.R.); 118; 1.07%	
Vegreville-Viking	Ed Stelmach; 5,540; 40.98%	Jerry Wilde; 3,797; 28.09%	Derek Fox; 4,150; 30.70%			
Vermilion-Lloydminster	Steve West; 5,524; 52.13%	Greg Michaud; 4,295; 40.53%	Grant Bergman; 744; 7.02%			
Wainwright	Robert A. (Butch) Fischer; 5,294; 54.71%	Evangeline Forcier; 1,933; 19.98%	Tom A. Samuel; 674; 6.96%	Dale Trefz; 1,760; 18.19%		Robert A. (Butch) Fischer
West Yellowhead	Fiona Fowler Cleary; 3,101; 32.20%	Duco Van Binsbergen; 3,562; 36.99%	Jerry J. Doyle; 2,243; 23.29%	Garry M. Klewchuk; 582; 6.04%	Mario Houle (Green); 120; 1.25%	Jerry J. Doyle
Wetaskiwin-Camrose	Ken Rostad; 6,297; 45.93%	Bob Prestage; 4,962; 36.19%	Bruce Hinkley; 1,597; 11.65%	Henry Neumann; 829; 6.05%		
Whitecourt-Ste. Anne	Peter Trynchy; 5,600; 48.11%	Jurgen Preugschas; 4,310; 37.03%	Connie Oskoboiny; 912; 7.84%	Earle Cunningham; 570; 4.90%	Walter Bliznicenko (Ind.); 218; 1.87%	

== See also ==
- List of Alberta political parties
