= Doug Elniski =

Canadian politician

MLA for Edmonton-Calder
- In office 2008–2012
- Preceded by: David Eggen
- Succeeded by: David Eggen

Personal details
- Born: 1960 or 1961 (age 65–66) Edmonton, Alberta, Canada
- Party: Progressive Conservative
- Occupation: Contractor, consultant, and industrial safety professional

Doug Elniski is a Canadian politician, contractor, consultant, and industrial safety professional who served as the Member of the Legislative Assembly for Edmonton-Calder from 2008 to 2012 as a member of the Progressive Conservative Association of Alberta.

== Early life ==
Elniski was born in Edmonton, Alberta.

Prior to being elected, Elniski worked in safety management, resource management, construction, adult education, and business consulting. He is a former volunteer firefighter.

== Political career ==
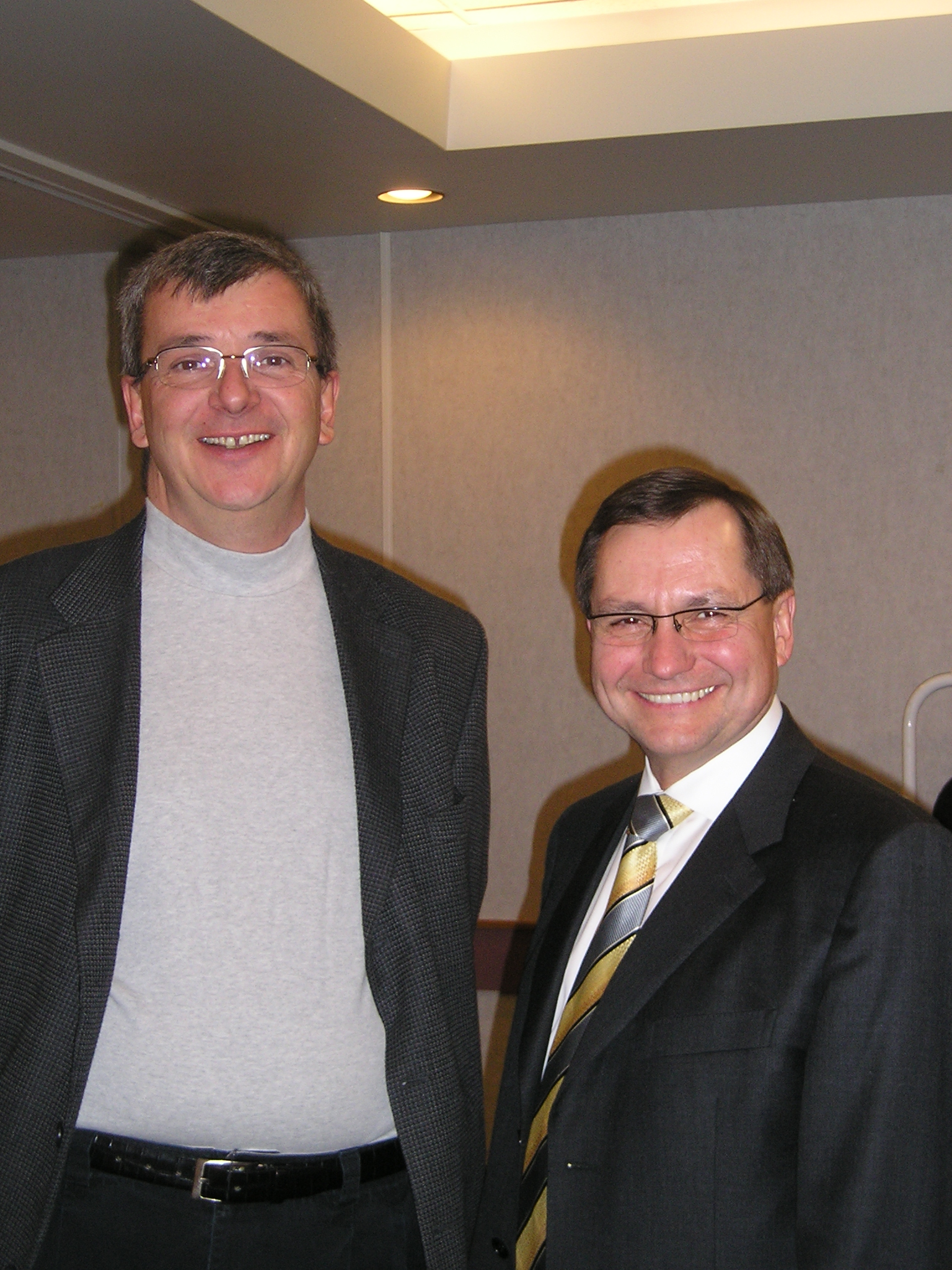
Doug Elniski (left) with Premier Ed Stelmach during the 2008 Alberta provincial election campaign in Alberta, Canada.

Elniski was elected to the Legislative Assembly of Alberta in the 2008 Alberta general election, defeating incumbent New Democratic Party MLA David Eggen by 178 votes in Edmonton-Calder.

Following the 2008 provincial election, Elniski was appointed Deputy Chair of the Standing Committee on the Alberta Heritage Savings Trust Fund. During his term he also served on the Standing Committee on Public Accounts, the Special Standing Committee on Members' Services, and the Special Standing Committee on Private Bills.

During his term, Elniski sponsored Motion 505, urging amendments to the Traffic Safety Act to permit low-speed vehicles on roads with posted speed limits of up to 60 km/h. The motion was adopted by the Legislative Assembly on April 20, 2009.

He also sponsored Bill Pr2, the Caritas Health Group Statutes Amendment Act, 2009, which received third reading in the Legislative Assembly on June 3, 2009.

In June 2009, comments Elniski posted on Twitter received provincial and national media attention. Opposition parties criticized the remarks as sexist and offensive. Elniski accepted responsibility for the remarks and issued a public apology, which Premier Ed Stelmach accepted.

During his time in the Legislative Assembly, Elniski was the tallest member of the Legislature, standing 6 ft 7 in (2.01 m). Despite his height, he became known for driving a Smart car.

Elniski completed his term as MLA and did not seek re-election in the 2012 Alberta general election. Following his service in the Legislative Assembly, he returned to work as a contractor and consultant.

=== 2008 general election ===
2008 Alberta general election: Edmonton-Calder
Party	Candidate	Votes	%	±%
Progressive Conservative	Doug Elniski	4,557	40.86%	7.83%
New Democratic	David Eggen	4,356	39.05%	3.05%
Liberal	Jim Kane	1,839	16.49%	-9.94%
Green	Michael Brown	402	3.60%	–
Total		11,154	–	–
Rejected, spoiled and declined		39	–	–
Eligible electors / turnout		27,420	40.82%	-8.17%
Progressive Conservative gain from New Democratic		Swing		-0.59%
Source(s) Source: "Edmonton-Calder Official Results 2008 Alberta general election". Elections Alberta.
