= Edmonton-Mayfield =

Defunct provincial electoral district in Alberta, Canada

Coordinates: 53.555°N 113.597°W

Alberta electoral district

Defunct provincial electoral district
- Legislature: Legislative Assembly of Alberta
- District created: 1993
- District abolished: 1997
- First contested: 1993
- Last contested: 1993

Edmonton-Mayfield was a provincial electoral district in Alberta, Canada, mandated to return a single member to the Legislative Assembly of Alberta using the first past the post method of voting from 1993 to 1997.

== History ==
The Edmonton-Mayfield electoral district was formed in the 1993 boundary redistribution from Edmonton-Kingsway and Edmonton-Calder. It was abolished in the 1997 boundary redistribution and formed Edmonton-Calder.

=== Members of the Legislative Assembly (MLAs) ===
Members of the Legislative Assembly for Edmonton-Mayfield
Assembly	Years	Member	Party
See Edmonton-Kingsway electoral district from 1971-1993 and Edmonton-Calder electoral district from 1971-1993
23rd	1993–1997	Lance White	Liberal
See Edmonton-Calder electoral district from 1997-2019

== Election results ==
=== 1993 ===
1993 Alberta general election
Party	Candidate	Votes	%	±%
Liberal	Lance White	6,495	48.17%	–
Progressive Conservative	Lynn Faulder	3,635	26.96%	–
New Democratic	Alex McEachern	3,173	23.53%	–
Natural Law	Annie Anderson	181	1.34%	–
Total		13,484	–	–
Rejected, spoiled, and declined		30	–	–
Eligible electors / turnout		23,430	57.68%	–
Liberal pickup new district.				
Source(s) Source: "Edmonton-Mayfield Official Results 1993 Alberta general election". Alberta Heritage Community Foundation.

== See also ==
- List of Alberta provincial electoral districts
- Canadian provincial electoral districts
- Mayfield, Edmonton
