= Lance White =

Canadian politician

Member of the Legislative Assembly of Alberta
- In office 1993–2001
- Constituency: Edmonton Mayfield (1993–1997); Edmonton-Calder (1997–2001)

Edmonton City Councillor
- In office 1983–1992

Personal details
- Born: August 31, 1946 (age 80) Winnipeg, Manitoba, Canada
- Party: Alberta Liberal Party
- Education: University of Alberta
- Occupation: Engineer

Lance Day White (born August 31, 1946) is a former Canadian municipal and provincial level politician. He served on the Edmonton city council from 1983 until 1992. He then moved on to provincial politics and served as a member of the Legislative Assembly of Alberta from 1993 until 2001. He was born in Winnipeg, Manitoba.

== Municipal politics ==
White began his political career as a municipal councillor for the city of Edmonton, Alberta. He won his first term on city council as a candidate running in Ward 4 of the 1983 Edmonton municipal election. The race for Ward 4 was hotly contested by a field of fifteen candidates. On election day White won the second place seat, finishing well behind incumbent Ed Leger. White rode a white horse down Jasper Avenue a few days prior to election day, which was said to be one of the reasons for his winning the seat over very stiff competition from, among others, Brian Mason.

He ran for his second term in office in the 1986 Edmonton municipal election, where he had an easy first place victory with incumbent Ed Leger going down to defeat, and Mel Binder won the second place seat. During his second term on city council, White ran for election to the Alberta Legislature in March 1989. He was defeated but continued as a city councillor.

In the 1989 Edmonton municipal election, White won his third term finishing ahead of Binder in a hotly contested race. Both incumbents finished well ahead of the other two challengers to each retain their seats. White vacated his city council seat in the fall of 1992, after which he and his family spent four months on a backpacking tour around the world. Upon his return, he successfully ran with the Laurence Decore Liberals in the 1993 Alberta general election. In the fall of 1995, while still a Member of the Alberta Legislature, White ran for the office of Mayor of Edmonton. He finished fifth in a field of seven candidates with three percent of the popular vote.

== Provincial politics ==
White had ambitions of running for a seat in the Alberta Legislature. While still a municipal councilor he ran as the Liberal candidate in Edmonton-Calder for the 1989 Alberta general election. He was defeated by incumbent Christie Mjolsness of the New Democrats. White easily won the electoral district of Edmonton-Mayfield in his second attempt to gain a seat in the 1993 Alberta general election defeating two term incumbent New Democrat MLA Alex McEachern. He was re-elected in the 1997 Alberta general election. The race was hotly contested, with all three candidates taking a third of the popular vote. White would be narrowly (400+ votes) defeated by Progressive Conservative Brent Rathgeber in the 2001 Alberta general election.

Political offices
Preceded by Gerry Wright; Paul Norris	Edmonton city councillor Ward 4; 1983 – 1992	Succeeded by Michael Phair; Tooker Gomberg
Legislative Assembly of Alberta
New district	Legislative Assembly of Alberta for Edmonton Mayfield; 1993 – 1997	District abolished
Preceded by Christie Mjolsness	Legislative Assembly of Alberta for Edmonton-Calder; 1997 – 2001	Succeeded by Brent Rathgeber
