= Brent Rathgeber =

Canadian politician (born 1964)

Brent Rathgeber KC

Member of Parliament for Edmonton—St. Albert
- In office October 14, 2008 – October 19, 2015
- Preceded by: John G. Williams
- Succeeded by: Michael Cooper

Member of the Alberta Legislative Assembly for Edmonton Calder
- In office March 12, 2001 – November 22, 2004
- Preceded by: Lance White
- Succeeded by: David Eggen

Personal details
- Born: July 24, 1964 (age 62) Melville, Saskatchewan, Canada
- Party: Progressive Conservative (2001-2004); Conservative (2008-2013); Independent (2013-present)
- Education: University of Saskatchewan
- Profession: Lawyer, author

Brent M. Rathgeber, KC (born July 24, 1964) is a lawyer, author and politician from Alberta, Canada. He was a Progressive Conservative member of the Legislative Assembly of Alberta from 2001 to 2004 and was elected to the House of Commons of Canada in the 2008 federal election as a Conservative. He resigned from the Conservative caucus in 2013 and sat as an independent. He ran as an independent candidate in the riding of St. Albert—Edmonton in the 2015 federal election but was defeated by Conservative candidate Michael Cooper.

In 2016, Rathgeber returned to the business world as a political consultant. He joined Cody Law Office in St. Albert, providing a full range of legal services, advocacy and consulting.

== Early life ==
Rathgeber was born in Melville, Saskatchewan. After graduating from Melville Comprehensive School in 1982, He obtained his Bachelor of Arts in Public Administration and Bachelor of Laws degrees from the University of Saskatchewan.

== Career ==
=== Alberta MLA (2001–2004) ===
Rathgeber won election to the provincial electoral district of Edmonton Calder in the 2001 Alberta general election after defeating Liberal incumbent Lance White.

In the 2004 Alberta general election, after only serving one term in office, he was defeated by David Eggen of the New Democratic Party.

=== House of Commons (2008–2015) ===
Rathgeber stood as the Conservative Party of Canada candidate for the federal electoral district of Edmonton—St. Albert in the 2008 election and was elected with 61.6 per cent of the vote. He was re-elected in the 2011 federal election.

Regarding supply management, Rathgeber said "One can occasionally be critical of the Government without being disloyal. I proudly serve in the Conservative (Government) Caucus but do not leave the viewpoints of my constituents behind every time I board a plane to Ottawa. It is natural for me to question Supply Management, since I represent 140,000 consumers but not a single dairy farmer. Similarly, all of my adult constituents are taxpayers but only a tiny fraction work for the federal government; as a result, I believe it is appropriate that I question public pensions (including my own) and demand respect for taxpayer dollars generally."

Rathgeber has voiced his support for motion 312, which says Canada should re-examine when human life begins.

Rathgeber blogged in 2012 that voters complained to him about the limousine expenses of Tory cabinet ministers when he travelled to Saskatchewan for a funeral.

On 5 June 2013, Rathgeber announced that he had resigned from the Conservative Caucus due to what he believed to be the "Government's lack of commitment to transparency and open government."

In November 2014, Rathgeber was awarded the honour of "Member of Parliament who best represents his constituents" by Maclean's magazine. This award was voted on by all Members of Parliament and recognized his ability to represent constituents more effectively when freed from party positions and discipline.

In the 2015 federal election, he ran as an independent in St. Albert—Edmonton, a reconfigured version of his old riding. He finished third, with 19.7 percent of the vote, behind Conservative candidate, Michael Cooper.

=== Post-parliamentary career ===
Rathgeber wrote a column for iPolitics.

== Bibliography ==
- Irresponsible Government: The Decline of Parliamentary Democracy in Canada (September 2014) Dundurn Press

The book contrasts the current state of Canadian democracy to the founding principles of responsible government established by the Fathers of Confederation in 1867. It examines the consequences of the inability or disincentive of modern elected representatives to perform their constitutionally mandated duty to hold the Prime Minister and his cabinet to account and the resultant disregard with which the executive now views Parliament. A chapter is devoted to Withholding the power: Canada's broken Access to Information laws.

== Electoral record ==
2015 Canadian federal election: St. Albert—Edmonton
Party	Candidate	Votes	%	±%	Expenditures
Conservative	Michael Cooper	26,783	45.24	-19.25	–
Liberal	Beatrice Ghettuba	13,383	22.54	+11.70	–
Independent	Brent Rathgeber	11,652	19.68	n/a	–
New Democratic	Darlene Malayko	6,609	11.16	-8.91	–
Green	Andrea Oldham	821	1.39	-3.22	–
Total valid votes/Expense limit		59,208	100.00		$218,855.94
Total rejected ballots		146	0.25	–	
Turnout		59,354	70.79	–	
Eligible voters		83,841			
Conservative hold		Swing		-15.47	
Source: Elections Canada

2011 Canadian federal election: Edmonton—St. Albert
Party	Candidate	Votes	%	±%	Expenditures
Conservative	Brent Rathgeber	34,468	63.46	+1.82	
New Democratic	Brian LaBelle	11,644	21.44	+5.67	
Liberal	Kevin Taron	5,796	10.67	-3.92	
Green	Peter Johnston	2,409	4.44	-3.54	
Total valid votes/Expense limit		54,317	100.00	–	
Total rejected ballots		151	0.28	+0.05	
Turnout		54,468	56.26	+2.59	
Eligible voters		96,815	–	–	

2008 Canadian federal election: Edmonton—St. Albert
Party	Candidate	Votes	%	±%	Expenditures
Conservative	Brent Rathgeber	31,436	61.6%	–	
New Democratic	Dave Burkhart	8,045	15.8%	–	
Liberal	Sam Sleiman	7,441	14.6%	–	
Green	Peter Johnston	4,072	8.0%	–	
Total valid votes		50,994			
Total rejected ballots		118			
Turnout		51,112	%		

=== Provincial elections ===
2004 Alberta general election: Edmonton-Calder
Party	Candidate	Votes	%	±%
New Democratic	David Eggen	4,067	36.01%	16.10%
Progressive Conservative	Brent Rathgeber	3,730	33.02%	-8.96%
Liberal	Brad Smith	2,985	26.43%	-11.68%
Alberta Alliance	Vicki Kramer	513	4.54%	–
Total		11,295	–	–
Rejected, spoiled and declined		48	–	–
Eligible electors / turnout		23,153	48.99%	-2.71%
New Democratic gain from Progressive Conservative		Swing		-0.45%
Source(s) Source: "Edmonton-Calder Official Results 2004 Alberta general election". Alberta Heritage Community Foundation.

2001 Alberta general election: Edmonton-Calder
Party	Candidate	Votes	%	±%
Progressive Conservative	Brent Rathgeber	5,128	41.98%	9.58%
Liberal	Lance White	4,654	38.10%	-2.21%
New Democratic	Christine Burdett	2,432	19.91%	-7.37%
Total		12,214	–	–
Rejected, spoiled, and declined		24	–	–
Eligible electors / turnout		23,671	51.70%	-1.81%
Progressive Conservative gain from Liberal		Swing		-2.01%
Source(s) Source: "Edmonton-Calder Official Results 2001 Alberta general election". Alberta Heritage Community Foundation.
