= David Eggen =

Canadian politician

The Honourable David Eggen ECA MLA
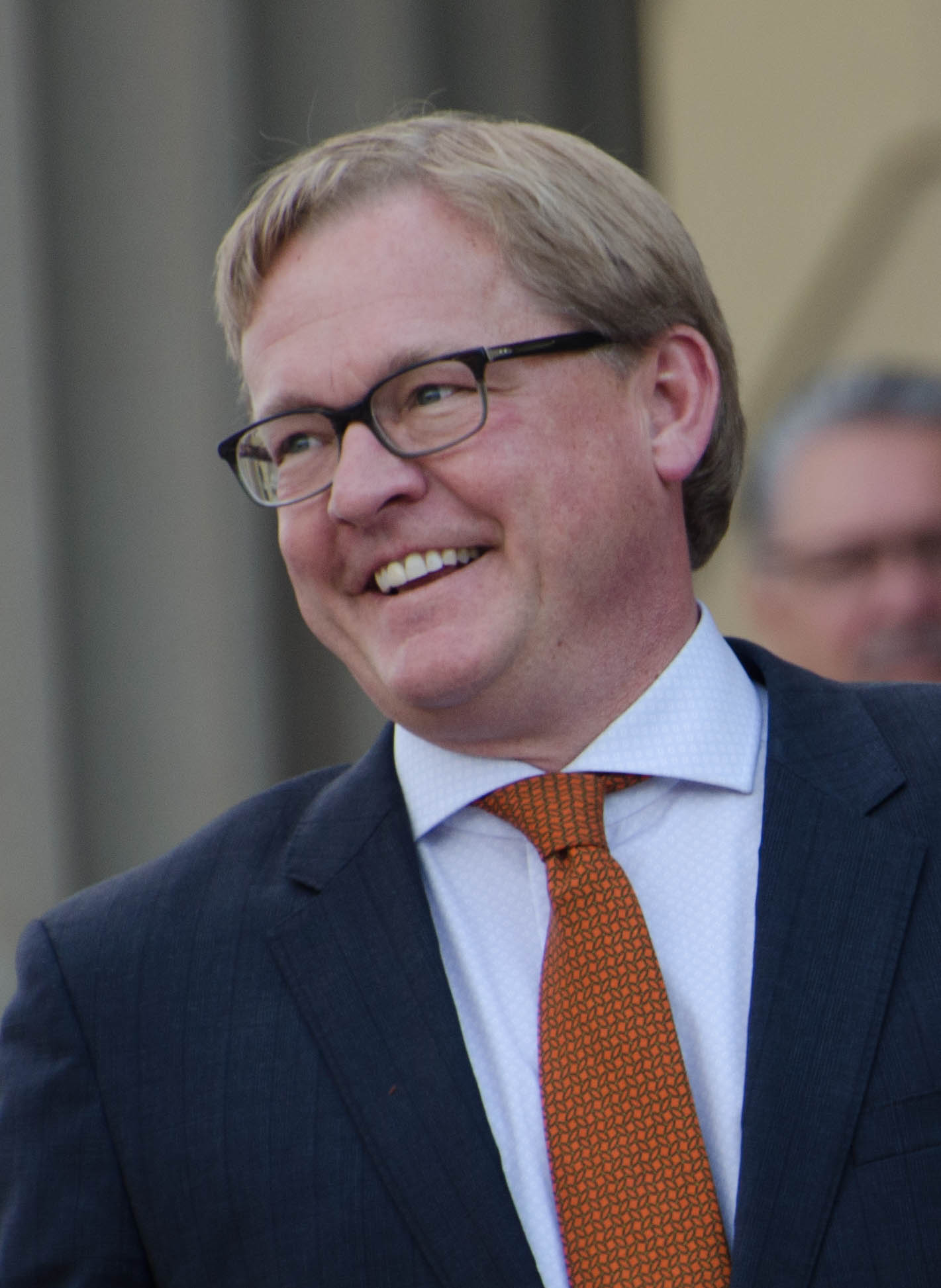
- Eggen in 2015

Minister of Education
- In office May 24, 2015 – April 30, 2019
- Premier: Rachel Notley
- Preceded by: Gordon Dirks
- Succeeded by: Adriana LaGrange

Dean of the Legislative Assembly of Alberta
- Incumbent
- Assumed office December 30, 2024
- Preceded by: Rachel Notley

Member of the Legislative Assembly of Alberta for Edmonton-North West (Edmonton-Calder; 2004–2019)
- Incumbent
- Assumed office April 23, 2012
- Preceded by: Doug Elniski
- In office November 22, 2004 – March 3, 2008
- Preceded by: Brent Rathgeber
- Succeeded by: Doug Elniski

Personal details
- Born: David Manson Eggen; 1962 (age 63–64)
- Party: New Democratic
- Spouse: Somboon Eggen
- Education: University of Alberta
- Occupation: Teacher
- Portfolio: Minister of Education, Minister of Culture

David Manson Eggen ECA MLA (born 1962) is a Canadian politician. He is a Member of the Legislative Assembly of Alberta, in 2019 he was elected as the member representing Edmonton-North West. He previously served three terms as the member representing Edmonton Calder from 2004-2008 and then again from 2012-2019. In 2014, Eggen ran in the NDP leadership election, where he placed second. He served as the Minister of Education and Minister of Culture and Tourism in Premier Notley's NDP government from 2015-2019. He is the longest current member of the Legislative Assembly of Alberta.

== Personal life ==
Born in 1962, Eggen was educated at the University of Alberta where he received a Bachelor of Education degree in 1984. Eggen then went to Zimbabwe, where he taught for three years, after which he returned to Edmonton, where he taught at local schools from 1990 to 2004. He also coached a wide variety of sports for high school and community teams. In 1996 and 1997, he also served as an education consultant, living and working with the Wat Dhammamongkol Temple in Bangkok, Thailand. He volunteered as an animator at Fort Edmonton Park.

Eggen has worked in health care as an executive director of Friends of Medicare, and was a member of the Canadian Health Coalition’s board of directors. He also acted provincial trustee with the Forum for Young Albertans and a chair leader of the Canadian Paraplegic Association. He was also a member of the Diversity, Equity and Human Rights committee for the Alberta Teachers' Association and an amateur musician. He lives in Edmonton with his wife.

== Political career ==
Eggen was first elected to the Legislative Assembly of Alberta as a New Democrat in the 2004 Alberta general election, narrowly defeating incumbent Progressive Conservative Brent Rathgeber. He was the first NDP representative elected in Edmonton-Calder since 1993, increasing his party's share of the vote from 18% to 36%. His victory was widely attributed to a two-year canvassing campaign in the run-up to the election. He served as the NDP's critic for Agriculture and Food, Environment, K-12 Education, Sustainable Resource Development, and Tourism and Culture.

He was defeated in the 2008 election by Progressive Conservative Doug Elniski. After this defeat Eggen assumed the Alberta Executive Director's position for Friends of Medicare, an advocacy group that supports public healthcare. Eggen regained his seat in the 2012 provincial election and retained it with a greatly increased margin in the 2015 election.

After the 2015 election Eggen was sworn in as the Minister of Education and as the Minister of Culture and Tourism. He maintained his position as Minister of Education until the 2019 election but was replaced by Ricardo Miranda as Minister of Culture and Tourism. As of June 21, 2024, he serves as the Whip of the Official Opposition caucus.

== Electoral history ==
=== 2001 general election ===
2001 Alberta general election: Edmonton-Centre
Party	Candidate	Votes	%	±%
Liberal	Laurie Blakeman	5,095	44.01%	0.06%
Progressive Conservative	Don J. Weideman	4,446	38.41%	4.91%
New Democratic	David Eggen	1,959	16.92%	-0.08%
Communist	Naomi Rankin	76	0.66%	–
Total		11,576	–	–
Rejected, spoiled, and declined		74	–	–
Eligible electors / turnout		22,648	51.44%	-0.66%
Liberal hold		Swing		-2.43%
Source(s) Source: "Edmonton-Centre Official Results 2001 Alberta general election". Alberta Heritage Community Foundation.

=== 2004 general election ===
2004 Alberta general election: Edmonton-Calder
Party	Candidate	Votes	%	±%
New Democratic	David Eggen	4,067	36.01%	16.10%
Progressive Conservative	Brent Rathgeber	3,730	33.02%	-8.96%
Liberal	Brad Smith	2,985	26.43%	-11.68%
Alberta Alliance	Vicki Kramer	513	4.54%	–
Total		11,295	–	–
Rejected, spoiled and declined		48	–	–
Eligible electors / turnout		23,153	48.99%	-2.71%
New Democratic gain from Progressive Conservative		Swing		-0.45%
Source(s) Source: "Edmonton-Calder Official Results 2004 Alberta general election". Alberta Heritage Community Foundation.

=== 2008 general election ===
2008 Alberta general election: Edmonton-Calder
Party	Candidate	Votes	%	±%
Progressive Conservative	Doug Elniski	4,557	40.86%	7.83%
New Democratic	David Eggen	4,356	39.05%	3.05%
Liberal	Jim Kane	1,839	16.49%	-9.94%
Green	Michael Brown	402	3.60%	–
Total		11,154	–	–
Rejected, spoiled and declined		39	–	–
Eligible electors / turnout		27,420	40.82%	-8.17%
Progressive Conservative gain from New Democratic		Swing		-0.59%
Source(s) Source: "Edmonton-Calder Official Results 2008 Alberta general election". Elections Alberta.

=== 2012 general election ===
2012 Alberta general election: Edmonton-Calder
Party	Candidate	Votes	%	±%
New Democratic	David Eggen	5,731	38.42%	-0.63%
Progressive Conservative	Bev Esslinger	5,177	34.71%	-6.15%
Wildrose	Rich Neumann	2,790	18.71%	–
Liberal	Alex Bosse	976	6.54%	-9.94%
Alberta Party	David Clark	189	1.27%	–
Social Credit	Margaret Saunter	52	0.35%	–
Total		14,915	–	–
Rejected, spoiled and declined		119	–	–
Eligible electors / turnout		29,535	50.90%	10.08%
New Democratic gain from Progressive Conservative		Swing		0.96%
Source(s) Source: "Edmonton-Calder Official Results 2012 Alberta general election". Elections Alberta.

=== 2015 general election ===
2015 Alberta general election: Edmonton-Calder
Party	Candidate	Votes	%	±%
New Democratic	David Eggen	12,837	70.72%	32.30%
Progressive Conservative	Thomas (Tom) Bradley	3,222	17.75%	-16.96%
Wildrose	Andrew Altimas	1,565	8.62%	-10.08%
Liberal	Amit (Sunny) Batra	527	2.90%	-3.64%
Total		18,151	–	–
Rejected, spoiled and declined		42	–	–
Eligible electors / turnout		36,266	50.17%	-0.74%
New Democratic hold		Swing		24.63%
Source(s) Source: "Edmonton-Calder Official Results 2015 Alberta general election". Elections Alberta.

=== 2019 general election ===
2019 Alberta general election: Edmonton-North West
Party	Candidate	Votes	%	±%
New Democratic	David Eggen	9,669	51.74%	-17.39%
United Conservative	Ali Eltayeb	6,587	35.25%	7.73%
Alberta Party	Judy Kim-Meneen	1,871	10.01%	–
Liberal	Brandon Teixeira	276	1.48%	-1.88%
Alberta Independence	Tim Shanks	149	0.80%	–
Alberta Advantage	Luke Burns	136	0.73%	–
Total		18,688	–	–
Rejected, spoiled and declined		80	74	23
Eligible electors / turnout		30,639	61.33%	N/A
Source(s) Source: "39 - Edmonton-North West, 2019 Alberta general election". officialresults.elections.ab.ca. Elections Alberta. Alberta. Chief Electoral Officer (2019). 2019 General Election. A Report of the Chief Electoral Officer. Volume II (PDF) (Report). Vol. 2. Edmonton, Alta.: Elections Alberta. pp. 152–155. ISBN 978-1-988620-12-1.

=== 2023 general election ===
2023 Alberta general election: Edmonton-North West
Party	Candidate	Votes	%	±%
New Democratic	David Eggen	9,978	59.74	+8.01
United Conservative	Ali Haymour	6,388	38.25	+3.00
Green	Tyler Beaulac	335	2.01	–
Total		16,701	99.14	–
Rejected and declined		145	0.86	
Turnout		16,846	51.98	
Eligible voters		32,407		
New Democratic hold		Swing		+2.50
Source(s) Source: Elections Alberta

== Cabinet ==
David Eggen was sworn into Cabinet on May 24, 2015 as part of the NDP government led by Rachel Notley. There had been speculation since the election that Eggen would receive a large portfolio in Cabinet. He was appointed as Minister of Education and Minister of Culture and Tourism.

In fall 2015, Eggen introduced Bill 8, a proposal to reform the collective bargaining structure for public school teachers in Alberta. Bill 8 proposes to introduce a two-table bargaining system, similar to the structure in Ontario, where the provincial government would handle big items like salary and local boards would negotiate local issues. The existing system sees all issues bargained locally.

There was criticism that school boards were not adequately consulted, but documents provided by Eggen's office to the media detailed consultations that had taken place in September and October 2015.
