= Carl Paproski =

Canadian politician (1945–2008)

MLA for Edmonton-Kingsway
- In office 1982–1986
- Preceded by: Kenneth Paproski
- Succeeded by: Alex McEachern

Personal details
- Born: January 25, 1945 Edmonton, Alberta
- Died: January 13, 2008 (aged 62) Edmonton, Alberta
- Party: Progressive Conservative
- Spouse: Vania Paproski
- Relatives: Steve Paproski; Kenneth Paproski
- Occupation: Teacher

Carl Michael Paproski (January 25, 1945 – January 13, 2008) was a teacher and provincial level politician from Alberta, Canada. He served as a member of the Legislative Assembly of Alberta from 1982 to 1986 sitting with the governing Progressive Conservative caucus.

== Political career ==
Paproski ran for a seat to the Alberta Legislature in the 1982 Alberta general election. He won the electoral district of Edmonton-Kingsway taking over from his brother Kenneth Paproski who held the district from 1971 to 1982. Paproski won a tight race defeating future MLA Alex McEachern and five other candidates. He retired from provincial politics after serving only a single term at dissolution of the Legislature in 1986.

His other brother Steve Paproski also served as a Member of Parliament in the House of Commons of Canada from 1968 to 1993.
