= Hinton Trail, Alberta =

Hinton Trail is a locality in northern Alberta, Canada within the County of Grande Prairie No. 1. It is approximately 40 km (25 mi) southwest of Grande Prairie at the north end of the Hinton Trail which ran from Jasper to Hinton, and then on to "the grande prairie". From Hinton, the trail followed Nose Creek north up to the Wapiti River, crossing it and heading overland to the Redwillow River about a half mile west of where the first Hinton Trail Post Office was set up in the home of Stan Ronksley on the NW quarter of section 5, township 70, range 10, west of the 6th meridian. The Ronksley home was across from Craigellachie School, a one-room log school built in 1922. The school also served as the community gathering place until the Hinton Trail Hall was built in 1947. The school closed in 1948, and the post office in 1968. The Hinton Trail Hall and a marker showing where the Hinton Trail crossed through the area about ½ mile east of the hall still mark this locality. Information on the people who lived in the Hinton Trail district can be found in Beaverlodge to the Rockies and its Supplement.
