= Steve Paproski =

Canadian politician (1928–1993)

The Honourable Steve Paproski PC

Deputy Chair of the Committees of the Whole
- In office 5 November 1984 – 8 September 1993
- Speaker: John Bosley; John Allen Fraser
- Preceded by: Hal Herbert
- Succeeded by: Shirley Maheu (1994)

Minister of State for Fitness and Amateur Sport and Multiculturalism
- In office 4 June 1979 – 2 March 1980
- Prime Minister: Joe Clark
- Minister: David MacDonald
- Preceded by: Iona Campagnolo (as Minister of State (Fitness and Amateur Sport))
- Succeeded by: Gerald Regan (as Minister of State (Sports))

Member of Parliament for Edmonton North (Edmonton Centre; 1968–1979)
- In office 25 June 1968 – 25 October 1993
- Preceded by: Riding established
- Succeeded by: John Loney

Personal details
- Born: Steven Eugene Paproski; 23 September 1928 Lwów, Poland
- Died: 3 December 1993 (aged 65)
- Party: Progressive Conservative
- Relatives: Kenneth Paproski; Carl Paproski; Edward Paproski

Steve Paproski PC (23 September 1928 – 3 December 1993) was a Canadian politician and professional football player. He played in the Canadian Football League (CFL) from 1949 to 1954 and served as a federal Member of Parliament from 1968 to 1993.

== Early life ==
Born in Lwów, Poland, he came to Edmonton, Alberta as a child. He attended the University of Arizona on a sports scholarship.

== Pro football career ==
He was a lineman for the Edmonton Eskimos of the Canadian Football League from 1949 to 1954. In this role he became part of the Edmonton Eskimo alumni which would come to dominate Alberta political life in future decades. Among other Eskimos from this era who achieved prominence in politics are Alberta premiers Peter Lougheed and Don Getty, plus lieutenant governor the honourable Norman Kwong.

== Political career ==
In 1968, he was elected to the House of Commons of Canada for the riding of Edmonton Centre. A Progressive Conservative, he was re-elected in 1972, and 1974. He was elected in 1979, 1980, 1984, and 1988 for Edmonton North. From 1976 to 1978, he was the Chief Opposition Whip. During Joe Clark's brief term as prime minister from 1979 to 1980, he was the Minister of State for Fitness and Amateur Sport and Minister of State for Multiculturalism. During Brian Mulroney's terms as prime minister from 1984 to 1993, he was the deputy chair of Committees of the Whole. While in opposition, Paproski served leader Robert Stanfield as deputy whip and later chief whip for the Progressive Conservative caucus.

Paproski was an ethnic Ukrainian and a Roman Catholic. His brothers Kenneth Paproski and Carl Paproski also served as members of the Legislative Assembly of Alberta.
