= Kenneth Paproski =

Canadian politician

Kenneth Robert Howard Paproski

Member of the Legislative Assembly of Alberta
- In office August 30, 1971 – November 2, 1982
- Preceded by: New District
- Succeeded by: Carl Paproski
- Constituency: Edmonton-Kingsway

Personal details
- Born: January 17, 1931
- Died: January 25, 2007 (aged 76)
- Party: Progressive Conservative
- Relatives: Steve Paproski; Carl Paproski

Kenneth Robert Howard Paproski (January 17, 1931 – January 25, 2007) is a former provincial level politician and medical doctor from Alberta, Canada. He served as a member of the Legislative Assembly of Alberta from 1971 to 1982.

== Early life ==
Paproski graduated from the University of Alberta with a medical degree.

== Political career ==
Paproski ran as a Progressive Conservative candidate in the 1971 Alberta general election. He defeated Social Credit incumbent Ethel Wilson. He ran for a second term in office in the 1975 Alberta general election. His majority was reduced but he defeated two other candidates with a comfortable margin. He ran for a third term in the 1979 Alberta general election, in that election he defeated future New Democrat MLA Alex McEachern and former Social Credit national leader Martin Hattersley. He retired at dissolution of the Assembly in 1982 and was replaced by his brother Carl Paproski. His other brother Steve Paproski also served as a federal Member of Parliament from 1968 to 1993.

Paproski returned to politics to run as an independent candidate in the 1989 Alberta Senate nominee election. He finished 5th out of 6th place winning 30,849 votes and taking 5% of the popular vote.

== Late life ==
Paproski was awarded the Michael Luchkovich award for outstanding public service by a parliamentarian of Polish origin in 2003. Paproski died on January 25, 2007.
