= Baranow, Edmonton =

Baranow
- Neighbourhood
- Location of Baranow in Edmonton
- Coordinates: 53.606°N 113.537°W
- Country: Canada
- Province: Alberta
- City: Edmonton
- Quadrant: NW
- Ward: Anirniq
- Sector: North
- Area: Castle Downs

Government
  - Administrative body: Edmonton City Council
  - Councillor: Erin Rutherford

Area
  - Total: 0.78 km^{2} (0.30 sq mi)
- Elevation: 682 m (2,238 ft)

Population (2012)
  - Total: 1,137
  - Density: 1,457.7/km^{2} (3,775/sq mi)
  - Change (2009–12): ▲26.5%
  - Dwellings: 751

Baranow is a neighbourhood in the Castledowns area of north Edmonton, Alberta, Canada. There is some commercial development at the south end of the neighbourhood along 137 Avenue. Development of the neighbourhood occurred in two periods. The first period occurred between the end of World War II and 1960 in Canada, during which approximately one in eight residences were constructed. The second period occurred after 1996 when the remaining residences were constructed.

The most common type of residence is the neighbourhood are apartments in low rise buildings with fewer than five storeys. These account for almost three out of every four (72%) of all residences in the neighbourhood. Approximately two out of three (65%) are rented, with the remainder being owner occupied condominiums. Most of the remaining are duplexes. Almost eight out of ten (79%) of duplexes are owner occupied.

The typical household in Baranow is small, with the average household having only 1.5 persons. Just under half (46.7%) have only one person. Another 40.0% have two persons, and the remaining 13.3% have three persons.

The neighbourhood is slightly L-shaped, being a little wider at the south end. The southern boundary is 137 Avenue, the northern boundary is 153 Avenue, and the western boundary is 127 Street. The east boundary follows a line located half a block west of 123 Street between 140 Avenue and 153 Avenue. At 140 Avenue, the boundary turns east until it reaches approximately 121 Street. At that point, it turns south again until it reaches 137 Avenue.

== Demographics ==
In the City of Edmonton's 2012 municipal census, Baranow had a population of 1,137 living in 751 dwellings, a 26.5% change from its 2009 population of 899. With a land area of 0.78 km^{2} (0.30 sq mi), it had a population density of 1,457.7 people/km^{2} in 2012.
