= Sine Chadi =

Canadian businessman and politician (b. 1956)

Member of the Legislative Assembly of Alberta for Edmonton–Roper
- In office 1993–1997
- Preceded by: district established
- Succeeded by: district abolished

Personal details
- Born: February 13, 1956 (age 70) Lac La Biche, Alberta
- Party: Alberta Liberal Party

Sine Kassim Chadi (born February 13, 1956) is a Canadian businessman, philanthropist and former politician. He is currently CEO and Chairman of Imperial Equities Inc. a publicly traded company on the TSX Venture Exchange. Chadi has been the CEO of companies involved in real estate and mortgage industries. Chadi was also elected to the Alberta Legislature in 1993 as the MLA for Edmonton Roper. He served one term.

== Political career ==
From 1993 to 1997, Chadi was a Member of the Legislative Assembly (MLA), elected as the Liberal candidate in Edmonton Roper during the 1993 Provincial Election. The election saw the Alberta Liberal Party under Laurence Decore lose narrowly to Ralph Klein's Conservatives in what was, to that point, the closest election in Alberta history. He defeated incumbent New Democrat MLA Christie Mjolness to win his seat. Chadi served as a Deputy Finance critic as well as critic for Economic Development and Trade and Science and Research, and Treasury. He also served as a member of the Public Accounts Committee, as well as on the Committees on the Alberta Heritage Savings Fund Act, the Select Standing Committee on law and Regulations and the Select Standing Committee on Public Affairs

In 1994, he ran for Leader of the Alberta Liberal Party. It was a controversial and divisive leadership process, which was ultimately won by Grant Mitchell. Chadi completed his term as MLA, and did not to run for a second term in the Legislature.

== Early life ==
The Chadi Family was among Canada's first Lebanese settlers, first travelling into the Lac La Biche area in 1895, where they participated in the fur trade, set up a general store and provided some of the most significant regional competition to the Hudson's Bay Company [24]. Sine's father Mike (Mahmoud) and his wife Zeher had six children, of which Sine was the third. Zeher Chadi died from breast cancer at the young age of 34 in 1967. Mike Chadi expanded his business focus to the Fort Chipwyan area and opened a general store in that area in 1972 while Sine Chadi and his siblings looked after the local businesses in the Lac La Biche area [25]. Sine graduated from High School in Lac La Biche in 1973 [26]

== Business career ==
Sine's earliest business activities were within his family businesses, from buying and trading furs to working in the livestock industry. Sine's business interests began to expand into the construction and management of retail fuel service centres, a mortgage business and an insurance agency as well as a real estate business In 1987, he moved his business operations to Edmonton, where he continues to be based. In 1998, Sine founded Imperial Equities. The company has grown over 20 years to the point where it has approximately 1 million square feet of leasable space. Imperial assets are valued at more than $220 million (2019 financial).

== Charitable work, community leadership, and fundraising ==
Chadi has supported many community groups and charities. He is known for his rousing auctioneering activities and for his generosity His has also offered business and promotion counsel to many causes.

Chadi is an active participant in the fundraising activities of many organizations. He was fundraising chair of a $7 million campaign for the Glenrose Rehabilitation Hospital Foundation, where he also served as a board member for many years. The Chadi Family Foundation, made the lead donation to the Glenrose's Capital Campaign in 2018, committing $1 million.

Chadi has also been a lead organizer for E4C, an organization focused on anti-poverty initiatives and operator of Edmonton City Hall's Hallway Café which provides job and life skills support to vulnerable youth. He was also the organizer of the Premier's Wild Game Dinner which raised money for multiple causes.

Chadi also currently serves a Director of the Parkinson Association of Alberta, and of the Gordon and Diane Buchanan Family Foundation, which has spearheaded the construction and operation of the $6 million Buchanan Centre as a wellness centre for people suffering from Parkinson disease. He has also served on the Board of the Capital Care Foundation and continues to financially support the organization. He was also finance chair for the $23 million Edmonton Islamic Academy

Legislative Assembly of Alberta
Preceded by New District	MLA Edmonton Roper; 1993-1997	Succeeded by District Abolished
