= Cumberland, Edmonton =

Cumberland
- Neighbourhood
- Location of Cumberland in Edmonton
- Coordinates: 53.610°N 113.553°W
- Country: Canada
- Province: Alberta
- City: Edmonton
- Quadrant: NW
- Ward: Anirniq
- Sector: North
- Area: The Palisades

Government
  - Administrative body: Edmonton City Council
  - Councillor: Erin Rutherford

Area
  - Total: 1.51 km^{2} (0.58 sq mi)
- Elevation: 685 m (2,247 ft)

Population (2012)
  - Total: 6,419
  - Density: 4,251/km^{2} (11,010/sq mi)
  - Change (2009–12): ▲5%
  - Dwellings: 2,166

Cumberland is a residential neighbourhood in the Palisades area of north west Edmonton, Alberta, Canada.

The community is represented by the Cumberland-Oxford Community League, established in 2002.

== Demographics ==
In the City of Edmonton's 2012 municipal census, Cumberland had a population of 6,419 living in 2,166 dwellings, a 5% change from its 2009 population of 6,112. With a land area of 1.51 km^{2} (0.58 sq mi), it had a population density of 4,251 people/km^{2} in 2012.

According to the 2001 federal census, substantially all residential construction (98.6%) in Cumberland occurred during the 1990s. Single-family dwellings account for approximately nine out of ten (91%) of the residences in the neighbourhood according to the 2005 municipal census. The remaining one out of ten (9%) are row houses. Nine out of ten residences (89%) are owner occupied with the remainder being rented.

The average household income in Cumberland is higher than the average household income in the City of Edmonton as a whole.

Income By Household - 2001 Census
Income Range ($)	Cumberland	Edmonton
	(% of Households)	(% of Households)
Under $10,000	1.4%	6.3%
$10,000-$19,999	2.1%	12.4%
$20,000-$29,999	1.4%	11.9%
$30,000-$39,999	8.5%	11.8%
$40,000-$49,999	12.7%	10.9%
$50,000-$59,999	10.6%	9.5%
$60,000-$69,999	14.1%	8.3%
$70,000-$79,999	13.2%	6.7%
$80,000-$89,999	11.3%	5.4%
$90,000-$99,999	8.5%	4.2%%
$100,000 and over	16.2%	12.6%%
Average household income	$73,076	$57,360

The neighbourhood is bounded on the east by 127 Street, on the west by 142 Street, on the north by 153 Avenue, and on the south by Cumberland Road (between 127 Street and 136 Street) and a line half a block north of 145 Avenue (between 136 Street and 142 Street).

== See also ==
- Edmonton Federation of Community Leagues
