= Wellington, Edmonton =

Wellington
- Neighbourhood
- Location of Wellington in Edmonton
- Coordinates: 53.596°N 113.557°W
- Country: Canada
- Province: Alberta
- City: Edmonton
- Quadrant: NW
- Ward: Anirniq
- Sector: Mature area

Government
  - Administrative body: Edmonton City Council
  - Councillor: Erin Rutherford

Area
  - Total: 1.22 km^{2} (0.47 sq mi)
- Elevation: 684 m (2,244 ft)

Population (2012)
  - Total: 3,140
  - Density: 2,573.8/km^{2} (6,666/sq mi)
  - Change (2009–12): ▲1.5%
  - Dwellings: 1,247

Wellington is a residential neighbourhood located in north west Edmonton, Alberta, Canada.

The neighbourhood was developed after World War II with approximately two out of three (66.8%) of residences built between 1946 and 1960. Another one in four residences (25.0%) were built during the 1960s. Development was substantially complete by 1970.

According to the 2005 municipal census, the most common type of residence in the neighbourhood is the single-family dwelling. These account for three out of every four (76%) residences. Row houses account for another one in six (16%) residences. The remaining residences are rented apartments in low-rise buildings with fewer than five stories (5%) and duplexes (2%). Seven out of ten (70%) of residences are owner-occupied with only three out of ten rented.

There are three schools in the neighbourhood. McArthur Elementary School is operated by the Edmonton Public School System while St. Angela Catholic Elementary School and Sir John Thompson Catholic Junior High School are operated by the Edmonton Catholic School System.

The neighbourhood is bounded on the north by 137 Avenue, on the east by 127 Street, and on the south by 132 Avenue. The western boundary is one half block west of 141 Street.

Wellington contains many parks and green spaces.

The community is represented by the Wellington Park Community League, established in 1958, which maintains a community hall and outdoor rink located at 132 Street and 134 Avenue.

== Demographics ==
In the City of Edmonton's 2012 municipal census, Wellington had a population of 3,140 living in 1,247 dwellings, a 1.5% change from its 2009 population of 3,094. With a land area of 1.22 km^{2} (0.47 sq mi), it had a population density of 2,573.8 people/km^{2} in 2012.

== See also ==
- Edmonton Federation of Community Leagues
