= Dunvegan (electoral district) =

Defunct provincial electoral district in Alberta, Canada

Alberta electoral district

Defunct provincial electoral district
- Legislature: Legislative Assembly of Alberta
- District created: 1959
- District abolished: 1971
- District re-created: 1986
- District re-abolished: 2004
- First contested: 1959
- Last contested: 2001

Dunvegan was a provincial electoral district in Alberta, Canada, mandated to return a single member to the Legislative Assembly of Alberta using the first past the post method of voting from 1959 to 1971, and again from 1986 to 2004.

The seat for Dunvegan in the Leglislative Assembly was held by the governing party for every year it existed. The riding was named for the small community of Dunvegan, once home to a fur trade post, and now the site of a provincial park and historic site.

== History ==
=== Boundary history ===
The first riding named Dunvegan was created out of the western half of Peace River in 1959. It was bounded on the south by the Peace River and extended north to the Northwest Territories border, containing the entire northwest corner of Alberta. When it was abolished in 1971, the north section of the riding was transferred back to Peace River, and the southern two-thirds of the riding, along with the northern half of Spirit River, became Spirit River-Fairview.

In 1986 Dunvegan was re-created, replacing all of Spirit River-Fairview and a small part of Smoky River. In 1993 it absorbed another part of Smoky River (including the community of Falher) as well as a small part of Peace River (including Grimshaw).

The Dunvegan electoral district was dissolved in the 2003 electoral boundary re-distribution, and replaced by the Dunvegan-Central Peace electoral district for the 2004 Alberta general election with no changes to the district's boundaries.

=== Representation history ===
Members of the Legislative Assembly for Dunvegan
Assembly	Years	Member	Party
See Peace River 1905-1959
14th	1959-1963	Joseph Scruggs	Social Credit
15th	1963-1967	Ernest Lee	Social Credit
16th	1967-1971	Ernest Lee	Social Credit
See Spirit River-Fairview 1971-1986
22nd	1986-1989	Glen Clegg	Progressive; Conservative
23rd	1989-1993	Glen Clegg	Progressive; Conservative
24th	1993-1997	Glen Clegg	Progressive; Conservative
25th	1997-2001	Glen Clegg	Progressive; Conservative
26th	2001-2004	Hector Goudreau	Progressive; Conservative
See Dunvegan-Central Peace 2004-2012

The first MLA for Dunvegan was Joseph Scruggs, who narrowly picked the riding up for the governing Social Credit. He did not run for re-election in 1963, but Ernest Lee held the riding for the government for two more terms.

The riding was then replaced by Spirit River-Fairview, which was picked up by New Democrat leader Grant Notley, who held that riding almost until it was replaced by Dunvegan in 1986.

In that election, the governing Progressive Conservatives would win the riding for the first time, despite an NDP surge elsewhere in the province. MLA Glen Clegg represented the area for five terms, retiring in 2001.

PC candidate Hector Goudreau would hold the riding for the government in its final term, and went on to represent Dunvegan-Central Peace for both terms it existed, as well as Dunvegan-Central Peace-Notley until 2015.

== Election results ==
=== 1950s ===
1959 Alberta general election
Party	Candidate	Votes	%	±%
Social Credit	Joseph M. Scruggs	1,080	38.96%	–
Progressive Conservative	Bennidict V. Griep	661	23.85%	–
Liberal	Steven P. Tachit	648	23.38%	–
Co-operative Commonwealth	Floyd Albin Johnson	383	13.82%	–
Total		2,772	–	–
Rejected, spoiled and declined		17	–	–
Eligible electors / turnout		3,551	78.54%	–
Social Credit pickup new district.				
Source(s) Source: "Dunvegan Official Results 1959 Alberta general election". Alberta Heritage Community Foundation.

=== 1960s ===
1963 Alberta general election
Party	Candidate	Votes	%	±%
Social Credit	Ernest Leonard Lee	1,306	52.66%	13.70%
Liberal	M.H. (Milt) Connery	849	34.23%	10.86%
New Democratic	Roy A. Mitchell	325	13.10%	-0.72%
Total		2,480	–	–
Rejected, spoiled and declined		10	–	–
Eligible electors / turnout		3,790	65.70%	–
Social Credit hold		Swing		1.66%
Source(s) Source: "Dunvegan Official Results 1963 Alberta general election". Alberta Heritage Community Foundation. NDP swing is compared to the CCF result in 1959.

1967 Alberta general election
Party	Candidate	Votes	%	±%
Social Credit	Ernest Leonard Lee	1,280	44.03%	-8.63%
New Democratic	Phil Thompson	1,080	37.15%	24.05%
Coalition	John A. Hammond	547	18.82%	-11.38%
Total		2,907	–	–
Rejected, spoiled and declined		176	–	–
Eligible electors / turnout		10,991	28.05%	–
Social Credit hold		Swing		-5.77%
Source(s) Source: "Dunvegan Official Results 1967 Alberta general election". Alberta Heritage Community Foundation. Liberal-PC Coalition swing is compared to the Liberal result in 1963.

=== 1980s ===
1986 Alberta general election
Party	Candidate	Votes	%	±%
Progressive Conservative	Glen Clegg	4,146	51.25%	21.32%
New Democratic	Jim Gurnett	3,944	48.75%	12.06%
Total		8,090	–	–
Rejected, spoiled and declined		32	–	–
Eligible electors / turnout		11,213	72.43%	–
Progressive Conservative pickup new district.				
Source(s) Source: "Dunvegan Official Results 1986 Alberta general election". Alberta Heritage Community Foundation. The 1986 swing is calculated from the 1984 by-election in Spirit River-Fairview, which had similar boundaries and which was won by Gurnett.

1989 Alberta general election
Party	Candidate	Votes	%	±%
Progressive Conservative	Glen Clegg	4,049	56.22%	4.97%
New Democratic	Jim Gurnett	2,603	36.14%	-12.61%
Liberal	R. Gerald Eherer	550	7.64%	–
Total		7,202	–	–
Rejected, spoiled and declined		13	–	–
Eligible electors / turnout		10,507	68.67%	–
Progressive Conservative hold		Swing		8.79%
Source(s) Source: "Dunvegan Official Results 1989 Alberta general election". Alberta Heritage Community Foundation.

=== 1990s ===
1993 Alberta general election
Party	Candidate	Votes	%	±%
Progressive Conservative	Glen Clegg	4,650	46.05%	-10.17%
Liberal	Hartmann Nagel	4,347	43.05%	35.41%
New Democratic	Sheila Maxwell-Marks	1,100	10.89%	-25.25%
Total		10,097	–	–
Rejected, spoiled, and declined		35	–	–
Eligible electors / turnout		16,275	62.25%	–
Progressive Conservative hold		Swing		-8.54%
Source(s) Source: "Dunvegan Official Results 1993 Alberta general election". Alberta Heritage Community Foundation.

1997 Alberta general election
Party	Candidate	Votes	%	±%
Progressive Conservative	Glen Clegg	5,149	54.64%	8.59%
Liberal	Fred Trotter	3,314	35.17%	7.88%
New Democratic	Marg McCuaig-Boyd	961	10.20%	-0.69%
Total		9,424	–	–
Rejected, spoiled and declined		14	–	–
Eligible electors / turnout		16,061	58.76%	–
Progressive Conservative hold		Swing		8.24%
Source(s) Source: "Dunvegan Official Results 1997 Alberta general election". Alberta Heritage Community Foundation.

=== 2000s ===
2001 Alberta general election
Party	Candidate	Votes	%	±%
Progressive Conservative	Hector Goudreau	5,857	67.25%	12.61%
Liberal	Bruce Rutley	1,888	21.68%	-13.49%
New Democratic	Yvonne Sinkevich	508	5.83%	-4.37%
Alberta Independence	Ron (Earl) Miller	248	2.85%	–
Independent	Fred Euler	208	2.39%	–
Total		8,709	–	–
Rejected, spoiled, and declined		30	–	–
Eligible electors / turnout		15,907	54.94%	–
Progressive Conservative hold		Swing		13.05%
Source(s) Source: "Dunvegan Official Results 2001 Alberta general election". Alberta Heritage Community Foundation. Ron (Earl) Miller was listed as an Independent, but represented the Independence Party of Alberta

== See also ==
- List of Alberta provincial electoral districts
- Canadian provincial electoral districts
