= Grande Prairie-Smoky =

Defunct provincial electoral district in Alberta, Canada

Coordinates: 55.379°N 118.323°W

Alberta electoral district
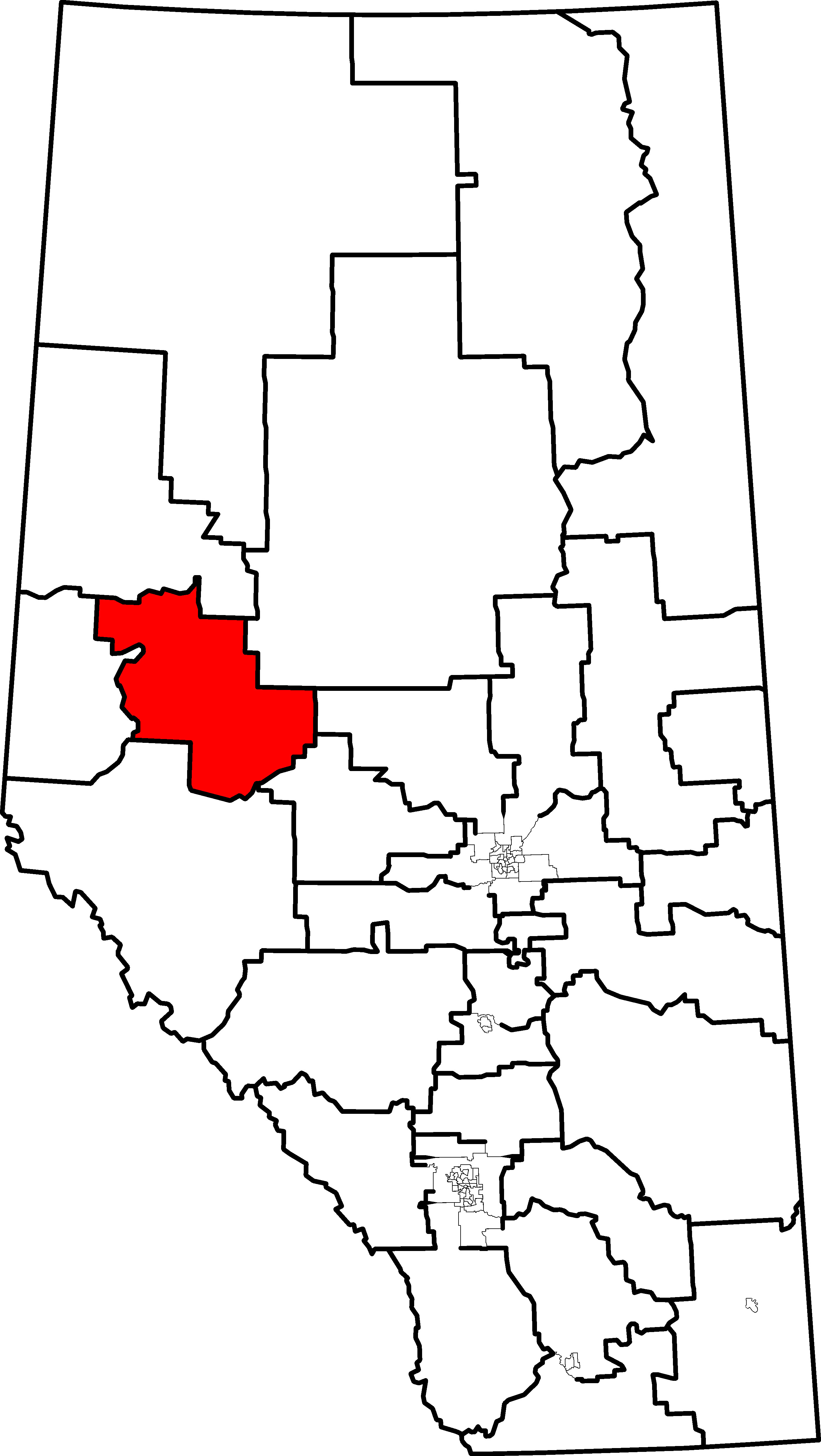
- 2004 boundaries

Defunct provincial electoral district
- Legislature: Legislative Assembly of Alberta
- District created: 1993
- District abolished: 2019
- First contested: 1993
- Last contested: 2015

Grande Prairie-Smoky was a provincial electoral district in Alberta, Canada, mandated to return a single member to the Legislative Assembly of Alberta using first-past-the-post balloting from 1993 to 2019. The riding was created in 1993 when from the Smoky River electoral district was expanded into the old Whitecourt electoral district. The district includes the north portion of the city of Grande Prairie as well as the towns of Fox Creek, Sexsmith, and Valleyview.

== History ==
The electoral district was created in the 1993 boundary redistribution from the electoral district of Smoky River and Whitecourt. It remained mostly unchanged in the 1997 and 2003 electoral boundary re-distributions. The Boundaries Commission proposed to abolish the district to create a completely urban Grande Prairie district but it changed its decision under public pressure. The 2010 re-distribution made minor changes to the border with Grande Prairie-Wapiti in the city of Grande Prairie but stayed the same in the rural areas.

=== Boundary history ===
56 Grande Prairie-Smoky 2003 boundaries
Bordering districts
North	East	West	South
Dunvegan-Central Peace, Lesser Slave Lake	Barrhead-Morinville-Westlock, Whitecourt-Ste. Anne	Grande Prairie-Wapiti	West Yellowhead
riding map goes here			
Legal description from Electoral Divisions Act, S.A. 2003, c. E-4.1
Starting at the intersection of the east boundary of Rge. 7 W6 and the north boundary of Sec. 7 in Twp. 75, Rge. 6 W6; then 1. east along the north boundary of Secs. 7, 8, 9, 10, 11 and 12 in Twp. 75, Rges. 6 and 5 W6 to the east boundary of Rge. 5 W6; 2. south along the east boundary of Rge. 5 to the north boundary of Twp. 74; 3. east along the north boundary of Twp. 74 to the east boundary of Sec. 3 in Twp. 75, Rge. 3 W6; 4. north along the east boundary of Secs. 3, 10, 15, 22 and 27 of the Twp. to the north boundary of the south half of Sec. 26 in the Twp.; 5. east along the north boundary of the south half of Secs. 26 and 25 in the Twp. to the east boundary of Rge. 3 W6; 6. north along the east boundary to the north boundary of Sec. 30 in Twp. 75, Rge. 2 W6; 7. east along the north boundary to the east boundary of the west half of Sec. 31 in the Twp.; 8. north along the east boundary to the north boundary of the south half of Sec. 31; 9. east along the north boundary of the south half of Secs. 31 and 32 in the Twp. to the east boundary of the west half of Sec. 32; 10. north along the east boundary of the west half of Sec. 32 in the Twp. and Sec. 5 in Twp. 76, Rge. 2 W6 to the north boundary of the south half of Sec. 5; 11. east along the north boundary to the east boundary of Sec. 5 in the Twp.; 12. north along the east boundary to the north boundary of Sec. 4 in the Twp.; 13. east along the north boundary of Secs. 4 and 3 in the Twp. to the east boundary of Sec. 3 in the Twp.; 14. south along the east boundary to the north boundary of Twp. 75; 15. east along the north boundary to the right bank of the Smoky River; 16. downstream along the right bank of the Smoky River to the right bank of the Little Smoky River; 17. upstream along the right bank of the Little Smoky River to the east boundary of Rge. 24 W5; 18. south along the east boundary to the north boundary of Twp. 73; 19. east along the north boundary to the east boundary of Rge. 20 W5; 20. south along the east boundary to the north boundary of Twp. 70; 21. east along the north boundary of Twp. 70 to the east boundary of Rge. 19 W5; 22. south along Rge. 19 to the north boundary of Twp. 67; 23. east along the north boundary to the east boundary of Rge. 14 W5; 24. south along the east boundary to the north boundary of Twp. 62; 25. west along the north boundary of Twp. 62 to the east boundary of Rge. 15 W5; 26. south along the east boundary to the north boundary of Twp. 61; 27. west along the north boundary of Twp. 61 to the east boundary of Rge. 16 W5; 28. south along the east boundary to the right bank of the Athabasca River; 29. upstream along the right bank of the Athabasca River to the right bank of the Berland River; 30. upstream along the right bank of the Berland River to the east boundary of Rge. 25 W5; 31. north along the east boundary to the north boundary of Twp. 62; 32. west along the north boundary to its most westerly intersection with the left bank of the Smoky River; 33. downstream along the left bank to the right bank of the Wapiti River; 34. upstream along the right bank to the east boundary of Sec. 19 in Twp. 70, Rge. 5 W6; 35. north along the east boundary of Secs. 19, 30 and 31 in the Twp. to the north boundary of Twp. 70; 36. west along the north boundary to the centre line of the Alberta RailNet Inc.; 37. in a generally northerly direction along the centre line of the Alberta RailNet Inc. to the south Grande Prairie city boundary; 38. east and north along the city boundary to the centre line of 100 Avenue (Richmond Avenue); 39. west along the centre line of 100 Avenue to the west Grande Prairie city boundary; 40. in a generally northerly and easterly direction along the city boundary to the intersection with the right bank of the Bear River; 41. upstream along the right bank of the Bear River to the intersection with the right bank of the Grande Prairie Creek; 42. upstream along the right bank of the Grande Prairie Creek to the north boundary of Twp. 72; 43. west along the north boundary to the east boundary of Rge. 7; 44. north along the east boundary of Rge. 7 to the starting point.
Note:

61 Grande Prairie-Smoky 2010 boundaries
Bordering districts
North	East	West	South
Dunvegan-Central Peace-Notley and Lesser Slave Lake	Barrhead-Morinville-Westlock, Whitecourt-Ste. Anne	Grande Prairie-Wapiti	West Yellowhead
Note: Boundary descriptions were not used in the 2010 redistribution

=== Representation history ===
Members of the Legislative Assembly for Grande Prairie-Smoky
Assembly	Years	Member	Party
See Grande Prairie 1930-1993, Smoky River; 1971-1993 and Whitecourt 1971-1993
23rd	1993–1997	Walter Paszkowski	Progressive; Conservative
24th	1997–2001	Walter Paszkowski	Progressive; Conservative
25th	2001–2004	Mel Knight	Progressive; Conservative
26th	2004–2008	Mel Knight	Progressive; Conservative
27th	2008–2012	Mel Knight	Progressive; Conservative
28th	2012–2015	Everett McDonald	Progressive; Conservative
29th	2015–2017	Todd Loewen	Wildrose
29th	2017-2019	Todd Loewen	United Conservative
See Grande Prairie, Grande Prairie-Wapiti and Central Peace-Notley 2019-

The electoral district was created in the 1993 boundary redistribution primarily from the old Smoky River and Whitecourt riding's. The first election held that year saw Progressive Conservative Smoky River incumbent Walter Paszkowski win a comfortable majority to pick up the seat for his party. He ran for a second term winning a larger majority in the 1997 election. He retired from the legislature at dissolution in 2001.

The former representative was Progressive Conservative Mel Knight who won his first election in 2001 with a massive majority taking 67% of the popular vote. He was re-elected to his second term in the 2004 election with a very large, but reduced majority.

Premier Ed Stelmach appointed Mel Knight as Minister of Energy in 2006. He won a slightly higher majority running for a third term in the 2008 general election. Knight was shuffled out of the Energy portfolio in 2010 and then served as the Minister of Sustainable Resource Development.

Upon his retirement, Everett McDonald kept the seat for the PCs at a reduced vote share in the 2012 election. In 2015, however, third-time candidate Todd Loewen finally captured the seat for Wildrose. He subsequently crossed the floor to the United Conservative Party when the two parties merged.

== Legislative election results ==
=== 1993 ===
1993 Alberta general election
Party	Candidate	Votes	%	±%
Progressive Conservative	Walter Paszkowski	4,942	55.06%	–
Liberal	John Croken	2,506	27.92%	–
New Democratic	Christine Potts	1,199	13.36%	–
Confederation of Regions	Herb Wohlgemuth	329	3.67%	–
Total		8,976	–	–
Rejected, spoiled, and declined		14	–	–
Eligible electors / turnout		16,434	54.70%	–
Progressive Conservative pickup new district.				
Source(s) Source: "Grande Prairie-Smoky Official Results 1993 Alberta general election". Alberta Heritage Community Foundation.

=== 1997 ===
1997 Alberta general election
Party	Candidate	Votes	%	±%
Progressive Conservative	Walter Paszkowski	5,753	64.71%	9.65%
Liberal	John A. Croken	1,995	22.44%	-5.48%
New Democratic	Linda Smith	1,143	12.86%	-0.50%
Total		8,891	–	–
Rejected, spoiled and declined		30	–	–
Eligible electors / turnout		18,818	47.41%	-7.30%
Progressive Conservative hold		Swing		7.56%
Source(s) Source: "Grande Prairie-Smoky Official Results 1997 Alberta general election". Alberta Heritage Community Foundation.

=== 2001 ===
2001 Alberta general election
Party	Candidate	Votes	%	±%
Progressive Conservative	Mel Knight	6,241	67.54%	2.84%
Liberal	Barry Robinson	1,777	19.23%	-3.21%
New Democratic	Leon Pendleton	842	9.11%	-3.74%
Alberta Independence	Dennis Young	380	4.11%	–
Total		9,240	–	–
Rejected, spoiled and declined		5	–	–
Eligible electors / turnout		21,068	43.88%	-3.53%
Progressive Conservative hold		Swing		3.02%
Source(s) Source: "Grande Prairie-Smoky Official Results 2001 Alberta general election". Alberta Heritage Community Foundation.

=== 2004 ===
2004 Alberta general election
Party	Candidate	Votes	%	±%
Progressive Conservative	Mel Knight	4,369	56.43%	-11.12%
Liberal	Neil Peacock	1,965	25.38%	6.15%
New Democratic	Georgina Szoke	724	9.35%	0.24%
Alberta Alliance	Hank Rahn	685	8.85%	–
Total		7,743	–	–
Rejected, spoiled and declined		25	–	–
Eligible electors / turnout		22,083	35.18%	-8.71%
Progressive Conservative hold		Swing		-8.63%
Source(s) Source: "Grande Prairie-Smoky Statement of Official Results 2004 Alberta general election" (PDF). Elections Alberta.

=== 2008 ===
2008 Alberta general election
Party	Candidate	Votes	%	±%
Progressive Conservative	Mel Knight	4,769	59.43%	3.01%
Liberal	John A. Croken	1,089	13.57%	-11.81%
Wildrose Alliance	Todd Loewen	1,049	13.07%	–
New Democratic	Neil R.M. Peacock	832	10.37%	1.02%
Green	Rebecca Villebrun	285	3.55%	–
Total		8,024	–	–
Rejected, spoiled and declined		31	–	–
Eligible electors / turnout		27,058	29.77%	-5.41%
Progressive Conservative hold		Swing		7.41%
Source(s) Source: The Report on the March 3, 2008 Provincial General Election of the Twenty-seventh Legislative Assembly. Elections Alberta. July 28, 2008. pp. 424–429.

=== 2012 ===
2012 Alberta general election
Party	Candidate	Votes	%	±%
Progressive Conservative	Everett McDonald	5,458	45.79%	-13.64%
Wildrose	Todd Loewen	4,912	41.21%	28.14%
New Democratic	Mary Dahr	757	6.35%	-4.02%
Liberal	Kevin McLean	583	4.89%	-8.68%
Independent	Andrew Muise	209	1.75%	–
Total		11,919	–	–
Rejected, spoiled and declined		34	–	–
Eligible electors / turnout		28,126	42.50%	12.73%
Progressive Conservative hold		Swing		-20.64%
Source(s) Source: "Grande Prairie-Smoky Official Results 2012 Alberta general election". Elections Alberta.

=== 2015 ===
2015 Alberta general election
Party	Candidate	Votes	%	±%
Wildrose	Todd Loewen	5,343	33.17%	-8.04%
New Democratic	Todd Russell	5,009	31.10%	24.75%
Progressive Conservative	Everett McDonald	4,968	30.84%	-14.95%
Liberal	Kevin McLean	787	4.89%	-0.01%
Total		16,107	–	–
Rejected, spoiled and declined		42	–	–
Eligible electors / turnout		32,930	49.04%	6.54%
Wildrose gain from Progressive Conservative		Swing		-1.25%
Source(s) Source: "Grande Prairie-Smoky Official Results 2015 Alberta general election". Elections Alberta.

== Senate nominee election results ==
=== 2004 ===
2004 Senate nominee election results: Grande Prairie-Smoky				Turnout 35.30%	
Affiliation	Candidate	Votes	% votes	% ballots	Rank
Progressive Conservative	Cliff Breitkreuz	3,304	16.08%	50.85%	3
Progressive Conservative	Betty Unger	2,831	13.77%	43.57%	2
Progressive Conservative	Bert Brown	2,779	13.52%	42.77%	1
Independent	Link Byfield	2,124	10.34%	32.69%	4
Progressive Conservative	David Usherwood	1,872	9.11%	28.81%	6
Progressive Conservative	Jim Silye	1,775	8.64%	27.32%	5
Alberta Alliance	Michael Roth	1,645	8.01%	25.32%	7
Alberta Alliance	Gary Horan	1,492	7.26%	22.96%	10
Alberta Alliance	Vance Gough	1,477	7.19%	22.73%	8
Independent	Tom Sindlinger	1,251	6.08%	19.26%	9
Total votes		20,550	100%		
Total ballots		6,497	3.16 votes per ballot		
Rejected, spoiled and declined		1,299			

Voters had the option of selecting four candidates on the ballot

== Student vote results ==
=== 2004 ===
Participating schools
Grande Prairie Composite HS
Harry Balfour School
Harry Gray Elementary School
Hillside Jr-Sr High School
Peace Wapiti Academy
Sexsmith Secondary School
St. Marys School
St. Stephens

On November 19, 2004, a student vote was conducted at participating Alberta schools to parallel the 2004 Alberta general election results. The vote was designed to educate students and simulate the electoral process for persons who have not yet reached the legal majority. The vote was conducted in 80 of the 83 provincial electoral districts with students voting for actual election candidates. Schools with a large student body that reside in another electoral district had the option to vote for candidates outside of the electoral district then where they were physically located.

2004 Alberta student vote results
Affiliation	Candidate	Votes	%
Progressive Conservative	Mel Knight	609	44.88%
Liberal	Neil Peacock	386	28.45%
NDP	Georgina Szoke	252	18.57%
Alberta Alliance	Hank Rahn	110	8.10%
Total		1,357	100%
Rejected, spoiled and declined		54	

=== 2012 ===
2012 Alberta student vote results
Affiliation	Candidate	Votes	%
Progressive Conservative	Everett McDonald		%
Wildrose	Todd Loewen		
Liberal	Kevin McLean		%
NDP	Mary Dahr		%
Total			100%

== See also ==
- List of Alberta provincial electoral districts
- Canadian provincial electoral districts
