= Cypress-Medicine Hat =

Provincial electoral district in Alberta, Canada

Coordinates: 50.13°N 110.98°W

Alberta electoral district
- Cypress-Medicine Hat within Alberta, 2017 boundaries

Provincial electoral district
- Legislature: Legislative Assembly of Alberta
MLA
Justin Wright
United Conservative
- District created: 1993
- First contested: 1993
- Last contested: 2023

Cypress-Medicine Hat is a provincial electoral district in the southeast corner of Alberta. Under the Alberta electoral boundary re-distribution of 2004, the constituency covers the portion of Medicine Hat south of the South Saskatchewan River, the Trans-Canada Highway and Carry Drive. The rest of the city is part of the Medicine Hat constituency, which Cypress-Medicine Hat surrounds. The constituency borders Saskatchewan to the east and Montana to the south. Clockwise from the Montana border, the district also borders Cardston-Taber-Warner, Little Bow, Strathmore-Brooks and Drumheller-Stettler. Other major towns include Bow Island and Redcliff. The constituency represents Cypress County and the County of Forty Mile No. 8.

The MLA for this district is the United Conservative Party's Justin Wright. Prior to 2023 the district was represented by Drew Barnes, who was first elected in 2012 as a Wildrose Party candidate in the 28th Alberta general election.

== History ==
The electoral district was created in the 1993 boundary redistribution from the old electoral district of Cypress-Redcliff. The 2010 boundary redistribution saw only minor changes made in the middle of the riding to align with changes to the Medicine Hat city limits.

=== Boundary history ===
50 Cypress-Medicine Hat 2003 boundaries
Bordering districts
North	East	Middle	West	South
Drumheller-Stettler	Saskatchewan boundary	Medicine Hat	Cardston-Taber-Warner, Little Bow and Strathmore-Brooks	Montana boundary
riding map goes here				
Legal description from the Statutes of Alberta 2003, Electoral Divisions Act.
Starting at the east boundary of Rge. 11 W4 and the north boundary of Sec. 18, Twp. 20, Rge. 10 W4; then 1. east along the north boundary of Secs. 18, 17, 16, 15, 14, 13 in Rges. 10, 9, 8, 7, 6, 5, 4 and 3 to the east boundary of Rge. 3 W4; 2. south along the east boundary of Rge. 3 W4 to the right bank of the South Saskatchewan River; 3. downstream along the right bank of the river to the east boundary of the Province; 4. south and west along the boundary of the Province to the east boundary of Rge. 11 in Twp. 1 W4; 5. north along the east boundary to the right bank of the Milk River; 6. upstream along the right bank of the Milk River to the east boundary of Sec. 20 in Twp. 2, Rge. 11 W4; 7. north along the east boundary of Secs. 20, 29 and 32 in the Twp. and along the east boundary of Secs. 5, 8, 17, 20, 29 and 32 in Twp. 3 to the north boundary of Twp. 3; 8. west along the north boundary to the east boundary of Rge. 14 W4; 9. north along the east boundary to the north boundary of Twp. 4; 10. west along the north boundary to the east boundary of Rge. 15 W4; 11. north along the east boundary to the north boundary of Sec. 18 in Twp. 7, Rge. 14 W4; 12. east along the north boundary of Secs. 18, 17 and 16 in the Twp. to the east boundary of Sec. 16 in the Twp.; 13. south along the east boundary to the north boundary of the south half of Sec. 15 in the Twp.; 14. east along the north boundary of the south half of Secs. 15 and 14 to the east boundary of Sec. 14 in the Twp.; 15. south along the east boundary to the north boundary of Sec. 12 in the Twp.; 16. east along the north boundary to the east boundary of Rge. 14 W4; 17. south along the east boundary to the north boundary of the south half of Sec. 7 in Twp. 7, Rge. 13 W4; 18. east along the north boundary of the south half of Secs. 7, 8 and 9 to the east boundary of Sec. 9 in the Twp.; 19. south along the east boundary to the north boundary of Sec. 3 in the Twp.; 20. east along the north boundary to the east boundary of Sec. 3 in the Twp.; 21. south along the east boundary to the north boundary of the south half of Sec. 2 in the Twp.; 22. east along the north boundary of the south half of Secs. 2 and 1 to the east boundary of Rge. 13 W4; 23. north along the east boundary to the right bank of the South Saskatchewan River; 24. upstream along the right bank of the South Saskatchewan River to the right bank of the Bow River; 25. upstream along the right bank of the Bow River to the north boundary of Twp. 13; 26. east along the north boundary to the east boundary of Rge. 11 W4; 27. north along the east boundary of Rge. 11 to the starting point; excluding the Electoral Division of Medicine Hat.
Note:

55 Cypress-Medicine Hat 2010 boundaries
Bordering districts
North	East	Middle	West	South
Drumheller-Stettler	Saskatchewan boundary	Medicine Hat	Cardston-Taber-Warner, Little Bow and Strathmore-Brooks	Montana boundary
Legal description from the Statutes of Alberta 2010, Electoral Divisions Act.

=== Representation history ===
Members of the Legislative Assembly for Cypress-Medicine Hat
Assembly	Years	Member	Party
Riding created from Cypress-Redcliff and Medicine Hat
23rd	1993-1997	Lorne Taylor	Progressive Conservative
24th	1997-2001	Lorne Taylor	Progressive Conservative
25th	2001-2004	Lorne Taylor	Progressive Conservative
26th	2004-2008	Leonard Mitzel	Progressive Conservative
27th	2008-2012	Leonard Mitzel	Progressive Conservative
28th	2012–2015	Drew Barnes	Wildrose
29th	2015–2017	Drew Barnes	Wildrose
29th	2017-2019	Drew Barnes	United Conservative
30th	2019–2021	Drew Barnes	United Conservative
30th	2021–2023	Drew Barnes	Independent
31st	2023–	Justin Wright	United Conservative

The electoral district was created in the boundary redistribution of 1993 from the old Cypress-Redcliff riding. The biggest change was the inclusion of parts of Medicine Hat that resulted in the name change.

The first election in the district held in 1993 was won by Progressive Conservative candidate Lorne Taylor who won with a comfortable margin defeating three other candidates. He won his second term with a stronger majority in 1997. Premier Ralph Klein promoted him to the cabinet and held a few portfolio's after that election. He won a third term in 2001 before retiring in 2004.

The second member for the district was Leonard Mitzel who was elected to his first term in the 2004 election. He was re-elected in 2008 with a landslide.

In the 2012 Alberta general election Wildrose candidate Drew Barnes defeated Progressive Conservative incumbent Leonard Mitzel. Barnes captured 53.6 per cent of the vote. Barnes was subsequently reelected in 2015 capturing 54.5 per cent of the vote. In 2017 the Barnes became a member of the United Conservative Party when the Wildrose Party merged with the Progressive Conservative Association of Alberta. Barnes was subsequently reelected in 2019, capturing 67.1 per cent of the popular vote. On May 13, 2021, Barnes and Central Peace-Notley MLA Todd Loewen were expelled from the United Conservative caucus to sit as an independents.

== Legislative election results ==
=== 1993 ===
1993 Alberta general election
Party	Candidate	Votes	%	±%
Progressive Conservative	Lorne Taylor	4,034	49.30%	–
Liberal	Lloyd B. Robinson	2,799	34.21%	–
Social Credit	Al Strom	855	10.45%	–
New Democratic	James Ridley	494	6.04%	–
Total		8,182	–	–
Rejected, spoiled and declined		33	–	–
Eligible electors / Turnout		13,688	60.02%	–
Progressive Conservative pickup new district.				
Source(s) Source: "Cypress-Medicine Hat Official Results 1993 Alberta general election". Alberta Heritage Community Foundation.

=== 1997 ===
1997 Alberta general election
Party	Candidate	Votes	%	±%
Progressive Conservative	Lorne Taylor	5,754	63.36%	14.05%
Liberal	Beverley Britton Clarke	2,217	24.41%	-9.80%
Social Credit	Maurice Perron	728	8.02%	-2.43%
New Democratic	Don Crisall	383	4.22%	-1.82%
Total		9,082	–	–
Rejected, spoiled and declined		21	29	4
Eligible electors / Turnout		17,779	51.22%	-8.79%
Progressive Conservative hold		Swing		11.93%
Source(s) Source: "Cypress-Medicine Hat Official Results 1997 Alberta general election". Alberta Heritage Community Foundation.

=== 2001 ===
2001 Alberta general election
Party	Candidate	Votes	%	±%
Progressive Conservative	Lorne Taylor	7,222	72.99%	9.64%
Liberal	Beverley Britton Clarke	2,074	20.96%	-3.45%
New Democratic	Cliff Anten	598	6.04%	1.83%
Total		9,894	–	–
Rejected, spoiled and declined		38	14	0
Eligible electors / Turnout		19,878	49.96%	-1.26%
Progressive Conservative hold		Swing		6.54%
Source(s) Source: "Cypress-Medicine Hat Official Results 2001 Alberta general election". Alberta Heritage Community Foundation.

=== 2004 ===
2004 Alberta general election
Party	Candidate	Votes	%	±%
Progressive Conservative	Leonard Mitzel	4,628	54.95%	-18.04%
Liberal	Stuart Angle	2,222	26.38%	5.42%
Alberta Alliance	Dan H. Pierson	652	7.74%	–
Social Credit	Eric Solberg	562	6.67%	–
New Democratic	Cliff Anten	358	4.25%	-1.79%
Total		8,422	–	–
Rejected, spoiled and declined		52	29	6
Eligible electors / Turnout		22,181	38.23%	-11.73%
Progressive Conservative hold		Swing		-11.73%
Source(s) Source: "00 - Cypress-Medicine Hat, 2004 Alberta general election". officialresults.elections.ab.ca. Elections Alberta.

=== 2008 ===
2008 Alberta general election
Party	Candidate	Votes	%	±%
Progressive Conservative	Leonard Mitzel	5,640	63.34%	8.39%
Liberal	Richard (Dick) Mastel	2,023	22.72%	-3.66%
Wildrose Alliance	Dan H. Pierson	679	7.63%	-0.09%
New Democratic	Manuel Martinez	347	3.90%	-0.35%
Green	Bright Pryde	215	2.41%	–
Total		8,904	–	–
Rejected, spoiled and declined		8	38	24
Eligible electors / Turnout		25,035	35.69%	-2.54%
Progressive Conservative hold		Swing		6.03%
Source(s) Source: "50 - Cypress-Medicine Hat, 2008 Alberta general election". officialresults.elections.ab.ca. Elections Alberta.

=== 2012 ===
2012 Alberta general election
Party	Candidate	Votes	%	±%
Wildrose Alliance	Drew Barnes	7,098	53.60%	45.97%
Progressive Conservative	Leonard Mitzel	4,738	35.78%	-27.56%
Liberal	Jon Mastel	770	5.81%	-16.91%
New Democratic	Manuel Martinez	637	4.81%	0.91%
Total		13,243	–	–
Rejected, spoiled and declined		75	47	5
Eligible electors / turnout		26,199	50.85%	15.16%
Wildrose Alliance gain from Progressive Conservative		Swing		-11.40%
Source(s) Source: "55 - Cypress-Medicine Hat, 2012 Alberta general election". officialresults.elections.ab.ca. Elections Alberta.

=== 2015 ===
2015 Alberta general election
Party	Candidate	Votes	%	±%
Wildrose	Drew Barnes	8,544	54.55%	0.95%
Progressive Conservative	Bob Olson	3,389	21.64%	-14.14%
New Democratic	Bev Waege	3,201	20.44%	15.63%
Liberal	Eric Musekamp	528	3.37%	-2.44%
Total		15,662	–	–
Rejected, spoiled and declined		38	33	3
Eligible electors / Turnout		29,694	52.88%	2.03%
Wildrose hold		Swing		7.55%
Source(s) Source: "55 - Cypress-Medicine Hat, 2015 Alberta general election". officialresults.elections.ab.ca. Elections Alberta.

2015 Alberta general election redistributed results
Party	Votes	%
Wildrose	8,861	44.32
New Democratic	5,765	28.84
Progressive Conservative	4,284	21.43
Liberal	360	1.80
Alberta Party	335	1.68
Independent	85	0.43
Source(s) Source: Ridingbuilder

=== 2019 ===
2019 Alberta general election
Party	Candidate	Votes	%	±%
United Conservative	Drew Barnes	16,483	67.06	+1.31
New Democratic	Peter Mueller	6,396	26.02	-2.82
Alberta Party	Colette Smithers	1,122	4.56	+2.89
Alberta Advantage Party	Terry Blacquier	359	1.46	–
Liberal	Anwar Kamaran	219	0.89	-0.91
Total		24,579	99.35	–
Rejected, spoiled and declined		162	0.65	
Turnout		24,741	67.60	
Eligible voters		36,597		
United Conservative notional hold		Swing		+2.06
Source(s) Source: "57 - Cypress-Medicine Hat, 2019 Alberta general election". officialresults.elections.ab.ca. Elections Alberta. Alberta. Chief Electoral Officer (2019). 2019 General Election. A Report of the Chief Electoral Officer. Volume II (PDF) (Report). Vol. 2. Edmonton, Alta.: Elections Alberta. pp. 249–254. ISBN 978-1-988620-12-1.

=== 2023 ===
2023 Alberta general election
Party	Candidate	Votes	%	±%
United Conservative	Justin Wright	13,489	61.89	-5.17
New Democratic	Cathy Hogg	7,697	35.32	+9.29
Wildrose Loyalty Coalition	Matt Orr	322	1.48	–
Alberta Independence	Cody Ray Both	287	1.32	–
Total		21,795	99.44	–
Rejected and declined		122	0.56	
Turnout		21,917	53.18	
Eligible voters		41,209		
United Conservative hold		Swing		-7.23
Source(s) Source: Elections Alberta

== Senate nominee election results ==
=== 2004 ===
2004 Senate nominee election results: Cypress-Medicine Hat				Turnout 37.92%	
Affiliation	Candidate	Votes	% votes	% ballots	Rank
Progressive Conservative	Bert Brown	3,412	16.23%	48.80%	1
Progressive Conservative	Betty Unger	3,119	14.83%	44.61%	2
Progressive Conservative	Cliff Breitkreuz	2,399	11.41%	34.31%	3
Progressive Conservative	Jim Silye	2,182	10.38%	31.21%	5
Progressive Conservative	David Usherwood	2,127	10.12%	30.42%	6
Independent	Link Byfield	2,062	9.81%	29.49%	4
Alberta Alliance	Michael Roth	1,678	7.98%	24.00%	7
Alberta Alliance	Vance Gough	1,496	7.11%	21.40%	8
Alberta Alliance	Gary Horan	1,409	6.70%	20.15%	10
Independent	Tom Sindlinger	1,142	5.43%	16.33%	9
Total votes		21,026	100%		
Total ballots		6,992	3.01 votes per ballot		
Rejected, spoiled and declined		1,418			

Voters had the option of selecting four candidates on the ballot

== Student vote results ==
=== 2004 ===
Participating schools
Burdett School
Eagle Butte High School
Senator Gershaw School
Seven Persons School
St. Mary's School
St. Michaels'
Sunrise School

On November 19, 2004, a student vote was conducted at participating Alberta schools to parallel the 2004 Alberta general election results. The vote was designed to educate students and simulate the electoral process for persons who have not yet reached the legal majority. The vote was conducted in 80 of the 83 provincial electoral districts with students voting for actual election candidates. Schools with a large student body that reside in another electoral district had the option to vote for candidates outside of the electoral district then where they were physically located.

2004 Alberta student vote results
Affiliation	Candidate	Votes	%
Progressive Conservative	Leonard Mitzel	396	57.98%
Liberal	Stuart Angle	142	20.79%
Alberta Alliance	Dan Pierson	59	8.64%
NDP	Cliff Aten	52	7.61%
Social Credit	Eric Solberg	34	4.98%
Total		683	100%
Rejected, spoiled and declined		25	

== See also ==
- List of Alberta provincial electoral districts
- Canadian provincial electoral districts
