= Central Peace-Notley =

Provincial electoral district in Alberta, Canada

Alberta electoral district
- Central Peace-Notley within Alberta (2017 boundaries)

Provincial electoral district
- Legislature: Legislative Assembly of Alberta
MLA
Todd Loewen
United Conservative
- District created: 2017
- First contested: 2019
- Last contested: 2023

Demographics
- Population (2016): 28,993
- Area (km²): 47,311
- Pop. density (per km²): 0.61

Central Peace-Notley is a provincial electoral district in Alberta, Canada. The district was one of 87 districts mandated to return a single member (MLA) to the Legislative Assembly of Alberta using the first past the post method of voting. It was contested for the first time in the 2019 Alberta election. The riding takes its name from its central location in the Peace River Country and from Grant Notley, who represented the region in the Legislature from 1971 to 1984 while serving as leader of the Alberta New Democratic Party.

== Geography ==
Central Peace-Notley is a largely rural riding located in northwestern Alberta. There are no cities in the riding. Urban municipalities include the towns of Fairview, Falher, Fox Creek, McLennan, Spirit River, and Valleyview. They also include the villages of Berwyn, Donnelly, Girouxville, Hines Creek, and Rycroft.

Central Peace-Notley also covers the entirety of six rural municipalities (Birch Hills County, Clear Hills County, the Municipal District of Fairview No. 136, the Municipal District of Smoky River No. 130, the Municipal District of Spirit River No. 133, and Saddle Hills County) and portions of two others (the Municipal District of Greenview No. 16 and the Municipal District of Peace No. 135)

The riding contains one of the Treaty 6 reserves of the Alexander First Nation (Alexander 134A) and the Treaty 8 reserves of the Sturgeon Lake Cree Nation, Duncan's First Nation (Duncans 151A) and Horse Lake First Nation (Clear Hills 152C). In addition to a large Indigenous community, the riding is also home to many Franco-Albertans, especially in the Smoky River area.

Clockwise from the north, Central Peace-Notley borders Peace River, Lesser Slave Lake, Athabasca-Barrhead-Westlock, West Yellowhead, Grande Prairie-Wapiti, and the province of British Columbia.

== History ==
Central Peace-Notley
Assembly	Years	Member	Party
Riding created from Dunvegan-Central Peace-Notley and Grande Prairie-Smoky
30th	2019–2021	Todd Loewen	United Conservative
30th	2021–2022	Todd Loewen	Independent
30th	2022–2023	Todd Loewen	United Conservative
31st	2023–Present	Todd Loewen	United Conservative

The district was created in 2017 when the Electoral Boundaries Commission recommended renaming Dunvegan-Central Peace-Notley and expanding its borders to include the portion of Grande Prairie-Smoky east of the County of Grande Prairie. The district also lost the area around Grimshaw to the district of Peace River.

Central Peace-Notley along with Lesser Slave Lake are one of two electoral districts in Alberta allowed to have a population between 25 percent and 50 percent below the provincial average, as it satisfies all five conditions laid out in the Electoral Boundaries Commission Act. Central Peace-Notley was created in 2017 with a population of 28,993 which was 38 percent below the average population of an electoral district of 46,803.

The district first elected United Conservative MLA Todd Loewen who had previously been elected to Grande Prairie-Smoky electoral district as a Wildrose candidate in 2015. Loewen defeated NDP candidate, Minister of Energy and Dunvegan-Central Peace-Notley district MLA Margaret McCuaig-Boyd by 7,910 votes. On May 13, 2021, Loewen and Cypress-Medicine Hat MLA Drew Barnes were expelled from the United Conservative caucus and became an independent after calling on Premier Kenney to resign.

In the provincial referendum of October 19, 2026, this riding was one of just two (along with Rimbey-Rocky Mountain House-Sundre) where the majority voted for initiating the process of holding a binding referendum, with the other 85 ridings voting against the referendum.

== Electoral results ==
=== 2023 ===
2023 Alberta general election
Party	Candidate	Votes	%	±%
United Conservative	Todd Loewen	9,280	77.68	+2.51
New Democratic	Megan Ciurysek	2,216	18.55	-0.95
Alberta Independence	Rodney Bowen	238	1.99	–
Alberta Party	Lynn Lekisch	166	1.39	-3.19
Solidarity Movement	Nancy O'Neill	46	0.39	–
Total		11,946	99.42	–
Rejected and declined		70	0.58	
Turnout		12,016	58.53	
Eligible voters		20,529		
United Conservative hold		Swing		+1.73
Source(s) Source: Elections Alberta

=== 2019 ===
2019 Alberta general election
Party	Candidate	Votes	%	±%
United Conservative	Todd Loewen	10,680	75.17%	10.31%
New Democratic	Margaret McCuaig-Boyd	2,770	19.50%	-15.66%
Alberta Party	Travis McKim	651	4.58%	–
Liberal	Wayne F. Meyer	106	0.75%	–
Total		14,207	–	–
Rejected, spoiled and declined		55	37	8
Eligible electors / turnout		19,745	72.46%	–
United Conservative notional hold		Swing		+17.8%
Source(s) Source: "55 - Central Peace-Notley, 2019 Alberta general election". officialresults.elections.ab.ca. Elections Alberta.

=== 2015 ===
Redistributed results, 2015 Alberta election
Party	Votes	%
Wildrose	4,378	36.39%
New Democratic	4,230	35.16%
Progressive Conservative	3,305	27.47%
Others	118	0.98%

== See also ==
- List of Alberta provincial electoral districts
- Canadian provincial electoral districts
