= Marg McCuaig-Boyd =

Canadian politician

The Honourable Margaret McCuaig-Boyd ECA
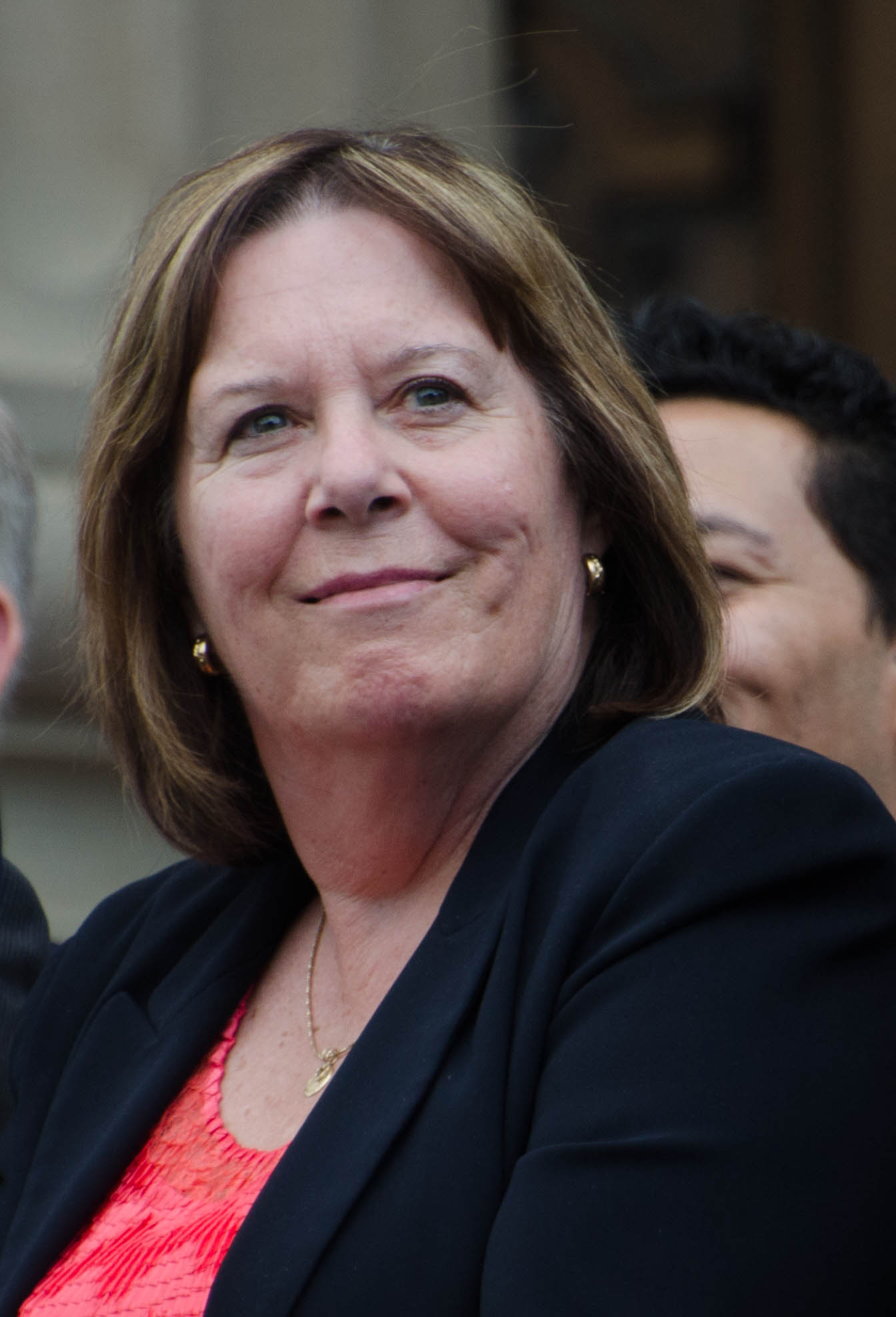
- McCuaig-Boyd in 2015

Minister of Energy
- In office May 24, 2015 – April 30, 2019
- Preceded by: Frank Oberle Jr.
- Succeeded by: Sonya Savage

Member of the Alberta Legislative Assembly for Dunvegan-Central Peace-Notley
- In office May 5, 2015 – March 19, 2019
- Preceded by: Hector Goudreau
- Succeeded by: Todd Loewen

Personal details
- Born: September 14, 1952 (age 74) Calgary, Alberta
- Party: New Democratic
- Education: University of Alberta (BA); San Diego State University (MA)
- Occupation: Educator
- Portfolio: Minister of Energy

Margaret Ellen McCuaig-Boyd ECA (born September 14, 1952) is a Canadian politician who was elected in the Alberta General Election, 2015 to the Legislative Assembly of Alberta representing the electoral district of Dunvegan-Central Peace-Notley. She was Minister of Energy in the Alberta Cabinet.

She lost her seat to UCP candidate Todd Loewen in the 2019 Alberta General Election, which also saw the defeat of the Notley NDP government.

== Life before Politics ==
Born in Calgary, McCuaig-Boyd holds a master's degree in Education Administration and Leadership, and served as Vice-President of the Fairview Campus of Grande Prairie Regional College from 2009 to 2013.

Prior to running in the 2015 election, McCuaig-Boyd was semi-retired and ran a consulting company.

McCuaig-Boyd holds a bachelor's degree in education from the University of Alberta and a master's degree in administration and leadership from San Diego State University.

In 2005, McCuaig-Boyd was the recipient of the Robert H. Routledge Award from the Alberta Schools Athletic Association for outstanding service to Alberta students and for the promotion and operation of an athletic program.

She is an active member of the community serving as a member and president of the Fairview Rotary Club and as a board member of the Fairview Chamber of Commerce.

== Criticism ==
During the 2015 campaign, she advocated for a progressive tax and less reliance in the province on oil and gas money. She had no prior energy industry experience, and the main reason for her appointment to the Energy portfolio may have been her background in northern Alberta, where it is a vital industry.

== Electoral history ==
=== 2019 general election ===
2019 Alberta general election: Central Peace-Notley
Party	Candidate	Votes	%	±%
United Conservative	Todd Loewen	10,680	75.17%	10.31%
New Democratic	Margaret McCuaig-Boyd	2,770	19.50%	-15.66%
Alberta Party	Travis McKim	651	4.58%	–
Liberal	Wayne F. Meyer	106	0.75%	–
Total		14,207	–	–
Rejected, spoiled and declined		55	37	8
Eligible electors / turnout		19,745	72.46%	–
United Conservative notional hold		Swing		+17.8%
Source(s) Source: "55 - Central Peace-Notley, 2019 Alberta general election". officialresults.elections.ab.ca. Elections Alberta.

=== 2015 general election ===
2015 Alberta general election: Dunvegan-Central Peace-Notley
Party	Candidate	Votes	%	±%
New Democratic	Marg McCuaig-Boyd	3,692	38.44%	+28.85%
Wildrose	Kelly Hudson	3,147	32.76%	-9.81%
Progressive Conservative	Rhonda Clarke-Gauthier	2,766	28.80%	-16.34%
Total valid votes		9,605	100.00%	–
Rejected, spoiled and declined		16	13	3
Eligible voters / turnout		16,392	58.79%	+0.25%
New Democratic gain from Progressive Conservative		Swing		+22.60%
Source(s) "2015 General Election Results". open.alberta.ca. Elections Alberta. May 24, 2015.

=== 1997 general election ===
1997 Alberta general election: Dunvegan
Party	Candidate	Votes	%	±%
Progressive Conservative	Glen Clegg	5,149	54.64%	8.59%
Liberal	Fred Trotter	3,314	35.17%	7.88%
New Democratic	Marg McCuaig-Boyd	961	10.20%	-0.69%
Total		9,424	–	–
Rejected, spoiled and declined		14	–	–
Eligible electors / turnout		16,061	58.76%	–
Progressive Conservative hold		Swing		8.24%
Source(s) Source: "Dunvegan Official Results 1997 Alberta general election". Alberta Heritage Community Foundation.
