= Everett McDonald =

Canadian politician

The Honourable Everett McDonald ECA
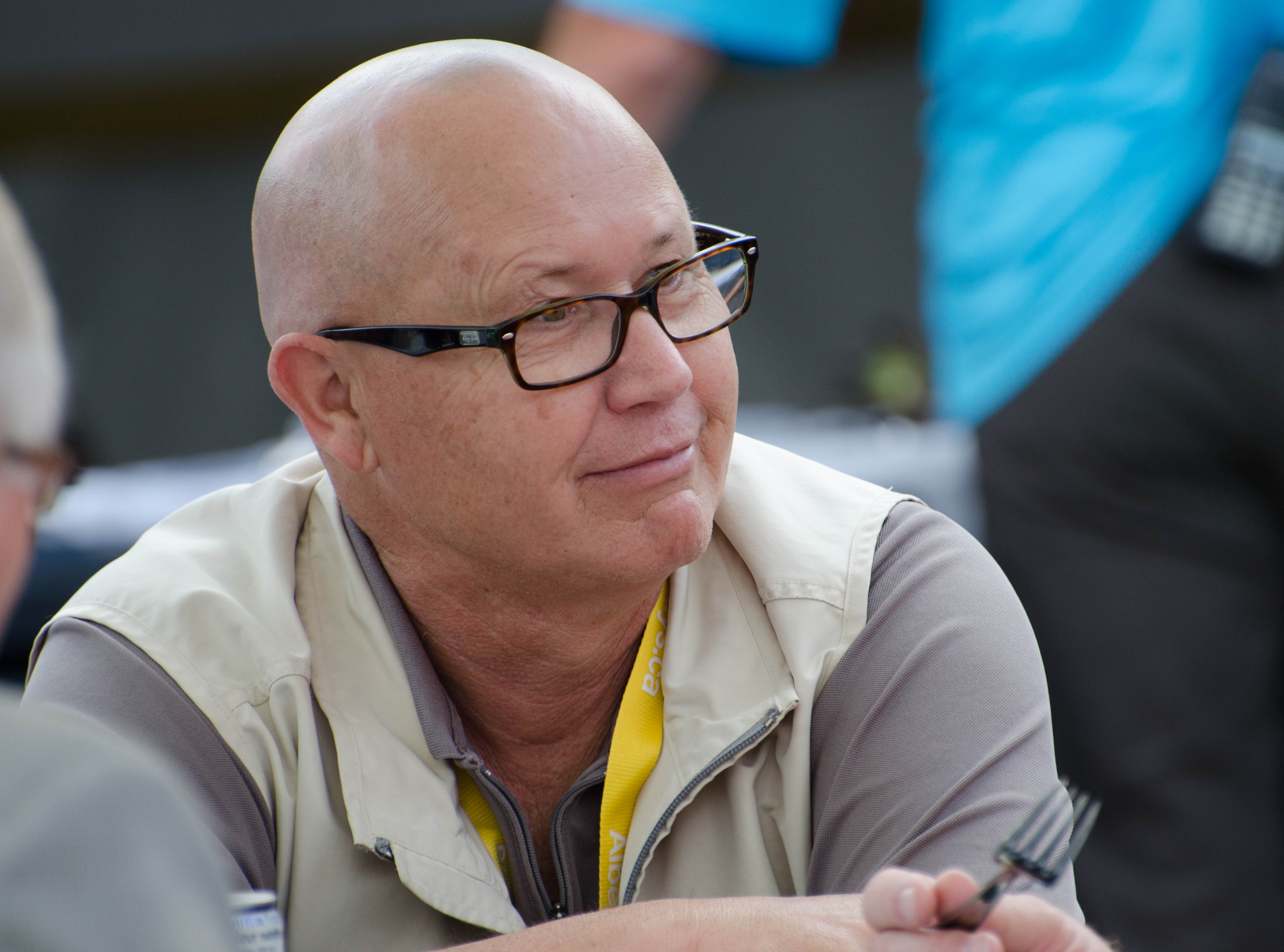

MLA for Grande Prairie–Smoky
- In office 2012–2015
- Preceded by: Mel Knight
- Succeeded by: Todd Loewen

Reeve of County of Grande Prairie No. 1
- In office 2004–2012
- Preceded by: Roy Borstad
- Succeeded by: Leanne Beaupre

Personal details
- Born: c. 1958 (age 67–68) Grande Prairie, Alberta
- Party: Progressive Conservative
- Spouse: Tina
- Children: 4
- Occupation: farmer, politician

Everett McDonald ECA (born c. 1958) is a Canadian politician who was an elected member to the Legislative Assembly of Alberta representing the electoral district of Grande Prairie-Smoky from 2012 to 2015. He formerly served as the Reeve of the County of Grande Prairie.

== Electoral history ==
=== 2015 general election ===
2015 Alberta general election: Grande Prairie-Smoky
Party	Candidate	Votes	%	±%
Wildrose	Todd Loewen	5,343	33.17%	-8.04%
New Democratic	Todd Russell	5,009	31.10%	24.75%
Progressive Conservative	Everett McDonald	4,968	30.84%	-14.95%
Liberal	Kevin McLean	787	4.89%	-0.01%
Total		16,107	–	–
Rejected, spoiled and declined		42	–	–
Eligible electors / turnout		32,930	49.04%	6.54%
Wildrose gain from Progressive Conservative		Swing		-1.25%
Source(s) Source: "Grande Prairie-Smoky Official Results 2015 Alberta general election". Elections Alberta.

=== 2012 general election ===
2012 Alberta general election: Grande Prairie-Smoky
Party	Candidate	Votes	%	±%
Progressive Conservative	Everett McDonald	5,458	45.79%	-13.64%
Wildrose	Todd Loewen	4,912	41.21%	28.14%
New Democratic	Mary Dahr	757	6.35%	-4.02%
Liberal	Kevin McLean	583	4.89%	-8.68%
Independent	Andrew Muise	209	1.75%	–
Total		11,919	–	–
Rejected, spoiled and declined		34	–	–
Eligible electors / turnout		28,126	42.50%	12.73%
Progressive Conservative hold		Swing		-20.64%
Source(s) Source: "Grande Prairie-Smoky Official Results 2012 Alberta general election". Elections Alberta.
