= Ernest Leonard Lee =

Canadian politician (1923–1977)

Member of the Legislative Assembly of Alberta
- In office June 17, 1963 – August 30, 1971
- Preceded by: Joseph Scruggs
- Succeeded by: District Abolished
- Constituency: Dunvegan

Personal details
- Born: September 19, 1923 Dunvegan, Alberta
- Died: July 8, 1977 (aged 53) Waterhole, Alberta
- Party: Social Credit
- Occupation: politician

Ernest Leonard Lee (September 19, 1923 – July 8, 1977) was a provincial politician from Alberta, Canada. He served as a member of the Legislative Assembly of Alberta from 1963 to 1971, sitting with the Social Credit caucus in government.

== Political career ==
Lee ran for a seat to the Alberta Legislature in the 1963 Alberta general election as the Social Credit candidate in the electoral district of Dunvegan. He won the district with a comfortable majority defeating two other candidates to hold it for his party. Lee ran for a second term in the 1967 Alberta general election. The election was hotly contested with Lee facing a strong challenge from NDP candidate Phil Thompson. He held his seat by a margin of 200 votes. Lee retired from the Alberta Legislature at dissolution in 1971.
