= Joseph Scruggs =

Canadian politician

Joseph M. Scruggs

Member of the Legislative Assembly of Alberta
- In office June 18, 1959 – June 17, 1963
- Preceded by: New district
- Succeeded by: Ernest Lee
- Constituency: Dunvegan

Personal details
- Born: May 30, 1888
- Died: March 20, 1964 (aged 75)
- Party: Social Credit
- Occupation: politician

Joseph M. Scruggs (May 30, 1888 – March 20, 1964) was a provincial politician from Alberta, Canada. He served as a member of the Legislative Assembly of Alberta from 1959 to 1963 sitting with the Social Credit caucus in government.

== Political career ==
Scruggs ran for a seat to the Alberta Legislature in the 1959 Alberta general election as a Social Credit candidate in the electoral district of Dunvegan. He defeated three other candidates in a hotly contested race taking just under 40% of the popular vote.

Scruggs retired from provincial office at dissolution of the Assembly in 1963.
