= Walter Paszkowski =

Canadian politician

Member of the Legislative Assembly of Alberta
- In office 1988–2001
- Preceded by: Marvin Moore
- Succeeded by: Mel Knight
- Constituency: Smoky River (1988–93); Grande Prairie-Smoky (1993–2001)

Personal details
- Born: Walter Joseph Paszkowski; April 23, 1934 (age 92) Sexsmith, Alberta, Canada
- Party: Progressive Conservative Association of Alberta
- Profession: farmer

Walter Joseph Paszkowski ECA AOE (born April 23, 1934) is a former Canadian farmer as well as a municipal and provincial level politician. He served as a member of the Legislative Assembly of Alberta from 1989 until 2001.

== Early life ==
Born in Sexsmith, Alberta, Paszkowski spent most of his working life in agriculture. He ran a seed farm and a retail seed outlet in his hometown of Sexsmith, Alberta. He served on the board of directors for various agriculture interest groups. They include chair of the Canola Council of Canada and president the Alberta Canola Growers. He was also a member of the Canadian Seed Growers Association.

== Political career ==
Paszkowski began his political career serving as mayor of Sexsmith. He served in that role for six years before moving to provincial politics.

Paszkowski ran for provincial office in the 1989 Alberta general election. He won the electoral district of Smoky River defeating three other candidates by a comfortable margin to hold the district for the Progressive Conservatives. His electoral district was abolished in 1993 and he ran for his second term in office in the new electoral district of Grande Prairie-Smoky. Paskowski won the new district with an increased plurality over his 1989 results.

Paszkowski ran for a third term in office in the 1997 Alberta general election winning a landslide majority. On December 7, 1998, while serving as Minister of Transportation and Utilities, Paskowski created an initiative to promote training for skilled labour in the Alberta highway construction industry. He retired at the end of his third term when the legislature was dissolved in 2001.

During his time in office he served as Minister of Agriculture, Food and Rural Development, Minister of Transportation and Utilities and Minister of Municipal Affairs.

== Late life ==
After leaving provincial politics, the Municipal District of Greenview provided funding along with numerous other partners to help establish the Museum Society for the Paszkowski House. He was later appointed to the board of directors of the Alberta Order of Excellence Council. In the early 2000s, he was heavily involved in efforts to build a paleontology museum atop the Pipestone Creek Pachyrhinosaurus bonebed, southwest of Grande Prairie. A later palaeontology museum, the Philip J. Currie Dinosaur Museum, was eventually built in Wembley, Alberta.

Legislative Assembly of Alberta
Preceded by Marvin Moore	MLA Smoky River; 1988-1993	Succeeded by District Abolished
Preceded by New District	MLA Grande Prairie-Smoky; 1993-2001	Succeeded by Mel Knight
