= Iosegun Lake =

Lake in Alberta, Canada

- Location within Alberta
- Location: Municipal District of Greenview No. 16, Alberta
- Coordinates: 54°28′37″N 116°50′57″W
- Basin countries: Canada
- Max. length: 7 km (4.3 mi)
- Max. width: 4.8 km (3.0 mi)
- Surface area: 13.4 km^{2} (5.2 sq mi)
- Average depth: 4.1 m (13 ft)
- Max. depth: 11.2 m (37 ft)
- Surface elevation: 774 m (2,539 ft)
- References: Iosegun Lake

Iosegun Lake is a lake in northwest Alberta within the Municipal District of Greenview No. 16. It is located north of Fox Creek, approximately 11 km (6.8 mi) from Highway 43.

Iosegun is a name derived from an Indigenous language denoting "tail".

== Provincial recreation area ==
The Iosegun Lake Provincial Recreation Area is located on the southeast shore of Iosegun Lake at the mouth of an unnamed creek originating at nearby Raspberry Lake to the east.

=== Camping ===
Operated by the Town of Fox Creek, the recreation area includes a campground featuring 52 campsites, a day use site, and a group use site. Camping season begins on May 24 and ends on October 1.

=== Recreation ===
Other recreational activities include canoeing/kayaking, cross-country skiing, fishing, ice fishing, power boating, snowmobiling (off-site), swimming, and water skiing.

== Fish species ==
Fish species in Iosegun Lake include burbot, lake whitefish, northern pike, spottail shiner, trout-perch, tullibee (cisco), walleye, white sucker, and yellow perch.

== See also ==
- List of lakes of Alberta
