= Justin Wright (politician) =

Canadian politician from Alberta (born 1984/85)

The Honourable Justin Wright ECA MLA

Member of the Legislative Assembly of Alberta for Cypress-Medicine Hat
- Incumbent
- Assumed office May 29, 2023
- Preceded by: Drew Barnes

Minister of Primary and Preventative Health Services of Alberta
- Incumbent
- Assumed office May 21, 2026
- Premier: Danielle Smith
- Preceded by: Adriana LaGrange

Personal details
- Born: 1984 or 1985 (age 40–41)
- Party: UCP

Justin Wright (born 1984 or 1985) is a Canadian politician from the United Conservative Party. He was elected as a Member of the Legislative Assembly of Alberta for Cypress-Medicine Hat in the 2023 Alberta general election. In 2026, he was appointed as Minister of Primary and Preventative Health Services.

Wright is a businessman and owns a food truck and catering company. He is originally from London, Ontario.

== Electoral history ==
=== 2023 general election ===
2023 Alberta general election: Cypress-Medicine Hat
| Party | Candidate | Votes | % | ±% |
|---|---|---|---|---|
| United Conservative | Justin Wright | 13,489 | 61.89 | -5.17 |
| New Democratic | Cathy Hogg | 7,697 | 35.32 | +9.29 |
| Wildrose Loyalty Coalition | Matt Orr | 322 | 1.48 | – |
| Alberta Independence | Cody Ray Both | 287 | 1.32 | – |
| Total | | 21,795 | 99.44 | – |
| Rejected and declined | | 122 | 0.56 | |
| Turnout | | 21,917 | 53.18 | |
| Eligible voters | | 41,209 | | |
| United Conservative hold | | Swing | | -7.23 |
Source(s) Source: Elections Alberta

=== 2023 UCP Cypress-Medicine Hat nomination contest ===
March 16, 2023

Candidate
| Candidate | Votes | % |
|---|---|---|
| Justin Wright | 217 | 56.2 |
| James Finkbeiner | 169 | 43.8 |
| Total | 386 | 100.00 |
