= Fox Creek, Alberta =

Fox Creek
- Town
- Town of Fox Creek
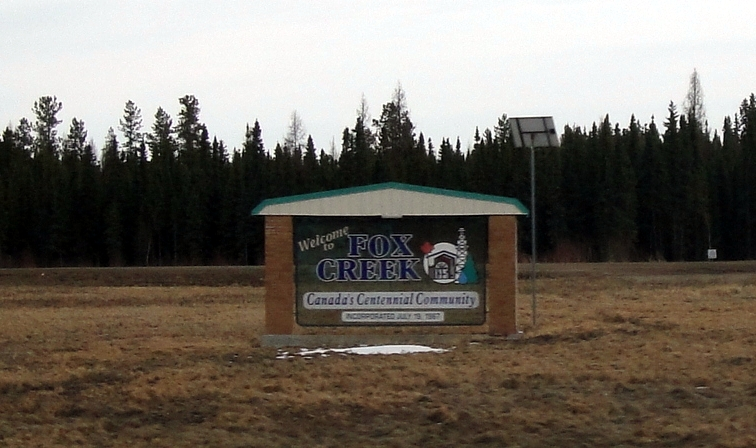
- Welcome sign
- Nicknames: Fox Vegas
- Motto(s): A Playground of Opportunity; Canada’s Centennial Community
- Town boundaries

- Location in Alberta Location in M.D. of Greenview
- Coordinates: 54°23′42″N 116°48′33″W
- Country: Canada
- Province: Alberta
- Region: Northern Alberta
- Planning region: Upper Peace
- Municipal district: Municipal District of Greenview No. 16
- Incorporated
  - New town: July 19, 1967
  - Town: September 1, 1983

Government
  - Mayor: Sheila Gilmour
  - Governing body: Fox Creek Town Council: Meesha Bainton; Brenda Burridge; Eric Scott Doran; Jim Hailes; Kerri Hudson; Kimberly Ann Norman
  - CAO: Kristen Milne
  - MP: Arnold Viersen
  - MLA: Todd Loewen

Area (2021)
  - Land: 12.26 km^{2} (4.73 sq mi)
- Elevation: 808 m (2,651 ft)

Population (2021)
  - Total: 1,792
  - Density: 133.6/km^{2} (346/sq mi)
- Time zone: UTC−06:00 (Alberta Time)
- Postal code span: T0H 1P0
- Area code: 780
- Highways: Highway 43
- Waterways: Smoke Lake; Iosegun Lake; Raspberry Lake; Fox Creek
- Website: Official website

Fox Creek is a town in northwest Alberta, Canada. It is located on Highway 43, approximately 259 km (161 mi) northwest of Edmonton and 199 km (124 mi) southeast of Grande Prairie, and has an elevation of 808 m (2,651 ft).

Fox Creek is within the Upper Peace planning region, and is surrounded by the Municipal District of Greenview No. 16.

== History ==
On June 6, 1952, the townsite for a future community was selected by Ryan Krause and Victor Heath. It was named Fox Creek after the watercourse adjacent to the western edge of the townsite, which drains towards Iosegun Lake to the north. The original survey of the townsite occurred over three days in late October, 1955.

At the same time, a townsite for another future community was surveyed to the north of Fox Creek on Iosegun Lake's eastern shore. This townsite turned out to be too wet, resulting in no development interest. The provincial government subsequently abandoned plans to develop a community at this location.

Residents began settling in Fox Creek shortly after Highway 43 officially opened in the fall of 1955, attracted by opportunities in the forestry and oil and gas exploration industries. The first two houses were built by Alberta Forest Services in 1956 to support a new ranger station that opened in 1957. Fox Creek's first two roadways, 1 Street West (the initial stage of Kaybob Drive) and Highway Avenue, were also constructed in 1956.

In 1957, the first significant oil field was discovered north of Fox Creek, known as the Kaybob North Field, and the community's first two businesses were established. Both businesses were services stations – under the British American and Imperial Oil banners – each with associated restaurants.

The community's post office was founded on March 18, 1958. It was named the Iosegun Lake Post Office, which was not officially renamed to the Fox Creek Post Office until 10 years later.

The late 1950s and early 1960s brought much activity to the Hamlet of Fox Creek as numerous sawmills, drilling rigs, and camps supporting drilling and road construction activities had established in the area. A total of 12 oil and gas fields were discovered over a six-year span between 1957 and 1962, of which included the discovery of a significant gas field to the south of Fox Creek in 1961 known as the Kaybob South Field. These discoveries triggered the construction of five gas plants in the Fox Creek area over the eleven years that followed the discovery of the Kaybob South Field.

The 1961 Census of Canada was the first census to record Fox Creek's population, but under the name of Iosegun Lake after the post office in the community. Its population in 1961 was 144. Over the following five years, Fox Creek grew to 187 residents according to the 1966 Census of Canada.

Under the signature of Premier Ernest Manning on July 19, 1967, the Province of Alberta incorporated the community as the New Town of Fox Creek. A three-member Board of Administrators was appointed at the time of incorporation, which included resident and businessman Otto Ritter as chairman and two public administrators from Alberta Municipal Affairs, Earl Briscoe (deputy chairman) and Len Gurel.

== Geography ==
The town is within 12 km (7.5 mi) of three lakes – Smoke Lake to the southwest, Iosegun Lake to the north, and Raspberry Lake to the northeast. The Fox Creek flows through the community, which empties into Iosegun Lake.

The Fox Creek area was subject to three earthquakes in 2015. The first occurred on January 14, 2015 approximately 38 km (24 mi) west of Fox Creek, measuring 3.8 on the Richter scale, while the second, measuring 4.4, occurred on January 22, 2015 approximately 36 km (22 mi) west of the town. No damages were reported on the former, while the latter was "lightly felt" within Fox Creek and has been reported as potentially being related to hydraulic fracturing within the Duvernay Formation. A third earthquake, measuring 4.4, occurred approximately 36 km (22 mi) east of the community on June 13, 2015.

== Demographics ==
Federal census population history
Year	Pop.	±%
1961	144	—
1966	187	+29.9%
1971	1,281	+585.0%
1976	1,625	+26.9%
1981	1,978	+21.7%
1986	2,068	+4.6%
1991	2,260	+9.3%
1996	2,321	+2.7%
2001	2,337	+0.7%
2006	2,278	−2.5%
2011	1,969	−13.6%
2016	1,971	+0.1%
2021	1,792	−9.1%
Source: Statistics Canada

In the 2021 Census of Population conducted by Statistics Canada, the Town of Fox Creek originally had a population of 1,639 living in 660 of its 985 total private dwellings. Statistics Canada subsequently revised Fox Creek's population to 1,792 living in 720 of its 1,071 total private dwellings, a change of −9.1% from its 2016 population of 1,971. With a land area of 12.26 km^{2} (4.73 sq mi), it had a population density of 146.2/km^{2} (378.6/sq mi) in 2021.

The population of the Town of Fox Creek according to its 2019 municipal census is 2,189, a change of 3.6% from its 2013 municipal census population of 2,112.

In the 2016 Census of Population conducted by Statistics Canada, the Town of Fox Creek recorded a population of 1,971 living in 775 of its 1,054 total private dwellings, a 0.1% change from its 2011 population of 1,969. With a land area of 12.36 km^{2} (4.77 sq mi), it had a population density of 159.5/km^{2} (413.0/sq mi) in 2016.

== Government ==
Fox Creek Town Council consists of a mayor and six councillors. The mayor and councillors were elected in the 2021 Alberta municipal elections. The members of town council are Mayor Sheila Gilmour and councillors Meesha Bainton, Brenda Burridge, Eric Scott Doran, Jim Hailes, Kerri Hudson, and Kimberly Ann Norman. The town's chief administrative officer is Kristen Milne.

Fox Creek federal election results
Year	Liberal		Conservative		New Democratic		Green	
2021	4%	34	74%	666	6%	52	1%	7
2019	3%	35	90%	933	4%	41	1%	11

Fox Creek provincial election results
Year	United Cons.		New Democratic	
2019	83%	635	12%	90

Fox Creek is located within the Central Peace-Notley provincial electoral district, represented by Todd Loewen of the United Conservative Party. At the federal level, Fox Creek is located within the Peace River—Westlock electoral district and is represented by Conservative Arnold Viersen.

== Economy ==
Fox Creek's economy is driven by the resource industry with oil and gas playing the primary role. The major oil and gas employer in the area, since the first decade of the 21st century, is SemCAMS, which purchased various area facilities previously owned by a mix of Chevron, BP Amoco and Petro-Canada. As of September 2010, the company owns and operates two sour gas processing plants (Kaybob South No. 3 and Kaybob Amalgamated), a sweet gas processing plant (West Fox Creek), and numerous pipelines in the area. The oilfield service industry supports oil and gas activities in the area, with numerous drilling and well service companies having branch offices in Fox Creek.

Fox Creek's secondary resource-based industry is forestry. Its role in Fox Creek's economy was threatened after a fire destroyed the area's lone sawmill – owned and operated by Millar Western Forest Products Ltd. – on August 29, 2008. After nearly two years of uncertainty about forestry's re-emergence in the local economy, Millar Western announced on June 18, 2010 that it would rebuild the Fox Creek sawmill. As of June 2013 the sawmill, named the Fox Creek Wood Products Division, employs 55 full-time staff producing dimension lumber in the amount of 620,000 board feet per shift or 125 million board feet per year. It has been operating on a single shift since full startup, which occurred in late 2011. The Fox Creek sawmill was acquired by Millar Western from Mostowich Lumber on August 1, 2007. Millar Western was bought out by Canfor in 2022. In July 2026, Canfor announced the permanent closure of the Fox Creek sawmill, which is expected to cease operations by late summer.

Other employers in Fox Creek are small in comparison to SemCAMS, Millar Western, and the oilfield service industry. Due to the town's location on Highway 43, the town has numerous service industry businesses that cater to travelers and workers supporting the oil and gas industry, as well as trucking operations.

== Education ==
Fox Creek School, operated by Northern Gateway Public Schools, is the primary educational institution in Fox Creek, serving students from Kindergarten to Grade 12. The school was attended by 455 students during the 2009/2010 school year, including 14 students in the Fox Creek Talent Developmental Centre program.

== See also ==
- Fox Creek Airport
- List of communities in Alberta
- List of towns in Alberta
