= Lorne Taylor =

Canadian politician

Member of the Legislative Assembly of Alberta
- In office June 15, 1993 – November 22, 2004
- Preceded by: Alan Hyland
- Succeeded by: Len Mitzel
- Constituency: Cypress-Medicine Hat

Personal details
- Born: 1944 (age 81–82) Manitoba, Canada
- Party: Progressive Conservative Association of Alberta
- Education: University of Calgary
- Profession: professor

Lorne Taylor (born 1944) is a former tenured professor and member of the provincial legislature of Alberta, Canada.

== Political career ==
Taylor was elected to the Legislative Assembly of Alberta in the 1993 Alberta general election. He defeated three other candidates including Al Strom of the Social Credit with a large plurality. He won his second term in office in the 1997 Alberta general election, with a larger plurality defeating three other candidates. In 1999 Taylor was appointed to the cabinet as Minister of Science and Innovation. He won his third term in office in the 2001 Alberta general election. This time Taylor won in a landslide defeating two other candidates. He was appointed to serve as Minister of the Environment and retired at dissolution of the Legislature in 2004.

Legislative Assembly of Alberta
Preceded by New District	MLA Cypress-Medicine Hat; 1993-2004	Succeeded by Leonard Mitzel
