= Mel Knight =

Canadian politician

The Honourable Mel Knight ECA

Member of the Legislative Assembly of Alberta for Grande Prairie-Smoky
- In office March 12, 2001 – April 23, 2012
- Preceded by: Walter Paszkowski
- Succeeded by: Everett McDonald

Alberta Minister of Energy
- In office December 15, 2006 – January 15, 2010
- Preceded by: Greg Melchin
- Succeeded by: Ron Liepert

Personal details
- Born: July 30, 1944 (age 82) Beaverlodge, Alberta, Canada
- Party: Progressive Conservative Association of Alberta
- Spouse: Diana
- Children: 3
- Profession: Mechanic, businessman, farmer
- Website: http://www.melknightmla.com

Melvyn Reginald Knight ECA (born July 30, 1944) is a Canadian politician who served as the Minister of Energy of Alberta from 2006 to 2010 and as a Progressive Conservative member of the Legislative Assembly of Alberta for the riding of Grande Prairie-Smoky from 2001 to 2012.

== Early life ==
Mel Knight was born July 30, 1944, in Beaverlodge, Alberta. His father worked for Northern Alberta Railways, and Knight grew up in the Peace Country. He graduated from Hillside High School in Valleyview, and worked as a roughneck and repairing equipment before earning his certification as a journeyman mechanic. He worked for drilling and petroleum companies until 1970, when he founded his own firm, Knight Measurement and Control, which eventually employed 55 people. He retired from this company in 1996. In 1972, he moved to a farm south of Vallyview, where he raised cattle and grew forage commercially. He bought a service station in 1974 that later operated as an antique shop (later shut down when the MD purchased the land for road access). He is also active in real estate.

== Municipal politics ==
Knight served as a municipal councillor for the Municipal District of Greenview No. 16.

== Provincial politics ==
=== Electoral record ===
Knight first sought provincial office in the 2001 Alberta election as the Progressive Conservative candidate in the riding of Grande Prairie Smoky, where incumbent Progressive Conservative Walter Paszkowski was not seeking re-election. Knight was easily elected, taking more than two-thirds of the vote against three opponents. He was re-elected by smaller margins, although still with majorities, in the 2004 and 2008 elections.

=== Backbencher ===
As a backbencher in Ralph Klein's Progressive Conservative caucus, Knight moved a number of government bills. The first was 2003's Electric Utilities Act, which made some changes to the government's deregulation of the province's electricity market. Much of the debate around the bill was about whether the government's deregulation had worked well to date. The bill was passed on a party line vote, with Knight's fellow Progressive Conservatives voting unanimously in favour and the opposition Liberals and New Democrats voting unanimously against. Knight also sponsored the Securities Amendment Acts, separate bills with the same name from different years, 2005 and 2006. The first of these was designed to harmonize the securities regulation with that of other provinces. It was supported by Liberals Rick Miller and Bill Bonko, who considered it a step in the right direction. New Democrats gave it a mixed reception, with Ray Martin agreeing that it did make some improvements, but with his colleague David Eggen trying to kill it on third reading, saying that what was needed was a supra-provincial securities regulator. The 2006 edition of the Securities Amendment Act implemented further harmonization, and passed with little debate. The Securities Transfer Act of the same year consolidated and harmonized the province's rules for transferring securities, and passed with all-party support.

In the 2006 Progressive Conservative leadership race, Knight endorsed eventual winner Ed Stelmach.

=== Minister of Energy ===
When Ed Stelmach became Premier in December 2006, he named Knight to his cabinet as Energy Minister. In this capacity, Knight oversaw some of the Stelmach government's most contentious policy issues, beginning with the government response to the Alberta Royalty Review, which recommended dramatically higher royalty rates from companies extracting oil in Alberta. The government rejected many of the review's recommendations, but did increase royalty rates by approximately 20% (25% less than recommended by the panel). These increases were criticized as too low by the opposition Liberals and New Democrats and as too high by some industry groups and Paul Hinman, the Wildrose Alliance Party's leader and sole MLA.

Knight also dealt with the Alberta Energy and Utilities Board affair, which resulted from the June 2007 revelation that the EUB, a government-mandated and appointed body responsible for regulating energy resource development, pipelines, transmission lines, and investor-owned electric, water, and natural gas utilities, as well as certain municipality-owned utilities, admitted that it had hired private investigators to spy on landowners who opposed the construction of a major power line in the Rimbey area. Even as Stelmach defended the use of investigators, Knight called on the EUB to explain itself. He ordered a judicial investigation into the issue, to run parallel to an investigation being conducted by provincial Information and Privacy Commissioner Frank Work. After Work's investigation found that the EUB had violated provincial law and infringed on the landowner's privacy, the opposition parties called for Knight's resignation. However, when Stelmach unveiled his new cabinet after his victory in the 2008 election, Knight remained as Energy Minister.

The major legislative initiative of Knight's time as Energy Minister has been the Alberta Utilities Commission Act, which became better known by its order paper designation, Bill 46. The bill split the EUB into two parts, the Alberta Utilities Commission (responsible for regulating utilities) and the Energy Resources Conservation Board (responsible for regulating oil and gas). The legislation was controversial, as elements of the EUB's governing legislation that provided for public notice and consultation in the event of energy construction projects were missing from the new entities. Opposition parties and activists protested the bill, but it passed through the legislature with the support of all Progressive Conservatives present.

Knight has also presided over the appointment of an expert panel charged with evaluating the possibility of introducing nuclear energy into Alberta. He was exposed to criticism when, in response to a question from Liberal leader Kevin Taft about why the panel did not include representation from environmental groups, he asserted that the Sierra Club supported the use of nuclear energy in Europe; in fact, the Sierra Club opposes the use of nuclear energy and does not operate in Europe. Knight apologized for his error.

In the government's 2008 throne speech, it asserted its intention to provide funding to expand Alberta's biofuels sector. Knight asserted that this expansion would not result in increased food prices for Albertans.

== Personal life ==
Knight is married to Diana, and the pair has three children. He is a volunteer hockey coach and is active with his local gun club and petroleum association.

== Election results ==
=== 2001 general election ===
2001 Alberta general election: Grande Prairie-Smoky
Party	Candidate	Votes	%	±%
Progressive Conservative	Mel Knight	6,241	67.54%	2.84%
Liberal	Barry Robinson	1,777	19.23%	-3.21%
New Democratic	Leon Pendleton	842	9.11%	-3.74%
Alberta Independence	Dennis Young	380	4.11%	–
Total		9,240	–	–
Rejected, spoiled and declined		5	–	–
Eligible electors / turnout		21,068	43.88%	-3.53%
Progressive Conservative hold		Swing		3.02%
Source(s) Source: "Grande Prairie-Smoky Official Results 2001 Alberta general election". Alberta Heritage Community Foundation.

=== 2004 general election ===
2004 Alberta general election: Grande Prairie-Smoky
Party	Candidate	Votes	%	±%
Progressive Conservative	Mel Knight	4,369	56.43%	-11.12%
Liberal	Neil Peacock	1,965	25.38%	6.15%
New Democratic	Georgina Szoke	724	9.35%	0.24%
Alberta Alliance	Hank Rahn	685	8.85%	–
Total		7,743	–	–
Rejected, spoiled and declined		25	–	–
Eligible electors / turnout		22,083	35.18%	-8.71%
Progressive Conservative hold		Swing		-8.63%
Source(s) Source: "Grande Prairie-Smoky Statement of Official Results 2004 Alberta general election" (PDF). Elections Alberta.

=== 2008 general election ===
2008 Alberta general election: Grande Prairie-Smoky
Party	Candidate	Votes	%	±%
Progressive Conservative	Mel Knight	4,769	59.43%	3.01%
Liberal	John A. Croken	1,089	13.57%	-11.81%
Wildrose Alliance	Todd Loewen	1,049	13.07%	–
New Democratic	Neil R.M. Peacock	832	10.37%	1.02%
Green	Rebecca Villebrun	285	3.55%	–
Total		8,024	–	–
Rejected, spoiled and declined		31	–	–
Eligible electors / turnout		27,058	29.77%	-5.41%
Progressive Conservative hold		Swing		7.41%
Source(s) Source: The Report on the March 3, 2008 Provincial General Election of the Twenty-seventh Legislative Assembly. Elections Alberta. July 28, 2008. pp. 424–429.

Alberta provincial government of Ed Stelmach
Cabinet post (1)
Predecessor	Office	Successor
Greg Melchin	Minister of Energy; 2006–2010	Ron Liepert
