= Ministry of Forestry and Parks =

The Ministry of Forestry and Parks (MFP) is a creation of the Alberta government. As of July 2024, it was led by Todd Loewen and its mandate was "To grow Alberta's manufactured wood products and forestry sector, preserving and managing Alberta's public lands and provincial parks."

== History ==
Sometime between June 2019 and July 2024 the Alberta government reorganized its Ministry of Agriculture and Forestry (which had been led by Devin Dreeshen) and its Ministry of Environment and Parks (which had been led by Jason Nixon) into the MFP.

In October 2022 Alberta Premier Danielle Smith merged the ministry of Forestry and the ministry of Parks. She created the Ministry of Environment and Protected Areas and the Ministry of Forestry, Parks and Tourism, to the latter of which she appointed Todd Loewen.

On May 6, 2023, Alberta declared a state of emergency because of wildfires and it lasted a month. "More than 38,000 people in 48 Alberta communities were displaced by evacuation orders in 2023... the number of wildfires [was] around 1,100 for the official season of March 1 to Oct. 31, 2023. Wildfires burned more than 2.2-million hectares of Alberta, or 10 times the five-year average area." Lightning caused roughly one-third of wildfires in 2023, the balance was caused by man.

In February 2024 the Wildland firefighters’ union were worried about the 2024 wildfire season: ‘Albertans should be concerned’. A 10-fold increase over the average season was seen in 2023, according to ministry statistics. In May 2024 the lumber industry put its own concern on the record. A recent paper "estimated that 6.6 per cent of the province's forested area burned" in 2023.

In April 2024, Minister Todd Loewen laid out how lessons from 2023 were to inform Alberta's approach to wildfires in 2024. In the Budget 2024 the government hired 100 more wildland firefighters. The same budget added $2 billion to a wildfire contingency fund, and recognized the $1.5 billion withdrawal in the previous year. The Alberta Emergency Management Agency spent $400 million in 2023–24, almost four times the year's budget projection, chiefly due to wildfires. Capital investments to support wildfire fighters like aircraft and other facilities and equipment were budgeted at $55 million.

The 2024 Jasper wildfire caused 25,000 residents to flee. "Bucketing efforts by helicopters failed. Crews using heavy equipment to build fireguards couldn't complete the work before having to pull back for safety. Water bombers couldn't help due to dangerous flying conditions. A last-ditch effort to use controlled burns to reroute the fire to natural barriers like Highway 16 and the Athabasca River failed. First responders were eventually forced out of town. Only structural firefighters equipped with personal respirators remained" on 25 July.

In May 2024 the UCP government introduced Bill 21 (called the Emergency Statutes Amendment Act, 2024) to centralize power during emergency situations such as wildfires, flood and drought. Change was to be made to the Forest and Prairie Protection Act. The changes were apparently necessitated by the muddle and jurisdictional confusion: in Alberta, municipalities have the first responsibility in emergencies, but often in 2023 they were overwhelmed by events.
