= Len Mitzel =

Canadian politician

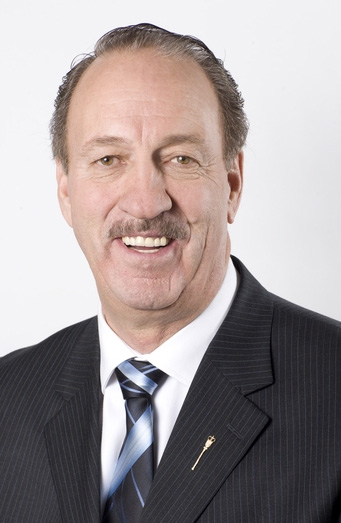

MLA for Cypress-Medicine Hat
- In office November 22, 2004 – April 23, 2012
- Preceded by: Lorne Taylor
- Succeeded by: Drew Barnes

Personal details
- Born: February 18, 1946 Lethbridge, Alberta
- Died: March 19, 2017 (aged 71) Medicine Hat, Alberta
- Party: Progressive Conservative
- Spouse: June
- Children: 2

Leonard Wendelin Mitzel (February 18, 1946 – March 19, 2017) was a Canadian politician and former Member of the Legislative Assembly of Alberta representing the constituency of Cypress-Medicine Hat as a Progressive Conservative.

== Early life ==
Mitzel was born in St. Michael's Hospital in Lethbridge and spent his early years in a farming environment near the now ghost town of Hoping, Alberta, southeast of Foremost, Alberta. After graduating from high school, he took a job as a surveyor for Alberta Transportation where he worked for seven years. During that time Mitzel rose through the ranks to become responsible for two crews, which were focused on the preliminary design and construction of major highways in southern Alberta. He then enrolled at the University of Lethbridge as a second-year pre-engineering student. When his father died in 1977, Mitzel returned to Foremost to run the family farm.

== Political life ==
Mitzel was elected to a second term representing the constituency of Cypress-Medicine Hat in the 2008 provincial election, where he received 63 per cent of the vote. He served as Deputy Chair of Committees. Mitzel chaired the Legislative Offices Committee and sat on the Select Special Ethics Commissioner Search Committee.

While in office, he continually advocated for a 24-hour Montana-Alberta border crossing at Wild Horse and the development of an alternative north–south transportation corridor along the east side of Alberta and supported the Canadian Centre for Unmanned Vehicle Systems at Defence R&D Canada at Suffield. In addition, Mitzel was the chair of the Montana-Alberta Bilateral Advisory Council, Alberta chair for the Pacific Northwest Economic Region and the Alberta representative on the Canadian/American Border Trade Alliance.

First elected in 2004, Mitzel received 55 per cent of the vote in his constituency. After he was elected, he served on numerous committees, including chairing the Alberta Rail Crossing Study and the Health Facilities Review Committee, and co-chairing the Ambulance Governance Review Council. He lost his seat in the 2012 Alberta Provincial Election to Drew Barnes, Wildrose Party candidate.

Prior to entering provincial politics, Mitzel was a councillor in the County of Forty Mile No. 8 for 15 years and the Reeve for the last 12 years on the council. Concurrently, he sat on the board of the Palliser Health Region for six years and served as chair for four of those years.

== Personal life ==
Mitzel and his wife, June Cole Mitzel, lived in Etzikom, Alberta. They were founding members and volunteer curators for the Etzikom Museum and the Canadian National Historic Windmill Centre [www.Facebook.com/etzikommuseum]. In these endeavours, Mitzel was awarded the Lyle Flynn Award for Tourism Promotion for South East Alberta and a TIALTA Small Attractions Award.

He received a number of awards honouring his involvement in his community, including a 125th Anniversary of the Confederation of Canada Medal in 1992, Queen Elizabeth II Golden Jubilee Medal in 2002 and an Alberta Centennial Medal in 2005. While Mitzel was chair of the South East Alberta Water Task Force, the committee was awarded an Emerald Award for its work reclaiming abandoned water wells.

Mitzel was a father of two and grandfather of seven. He enjoyed music, theatre, hunting, trail riding and golf.

Mitzel died on March 19, 2017, in Medicine Hat, Alberta from cancer, aged 71.

== Election results ==
2008 Alberta general election results (Cypress-Medicine Hat)		Turnout 35.5%	
Affiliation	Candidate	Votes	%
Progressive Conservative	Len Mitzel	5,640	63%
Wildrose Alliance	Dan H. Pierson	679	8%
Liberal	Richard (Dick) Mastel	2,022	23%
Green	Bright Pryde	215	2%
NDP	Manuel Martinez	347	4%
Total		8,903	100%
2004 Alberta general election results (Cypress-Medicine Hat)		Turnout 38.4%	
Affiliation	Candidate	Votes	%
Progressive Conservative	Len Mitzel	4,628	55%
Alberta Alliance	Dan H. Pierson	652	8%
Liberal	Stuart Angle	2,222	26%
NDP	Cliff Aten	358	4%
Social Credit	Eric Solberg	562	7%
Total		8,422	100%

2012 Alberta general election: Cypress-Medicine Hat
Party	Candidate	Votes	%	±%
Wildrose Alliance	Drew Barnes	7,098	53.60%	45.97%
Progressive Conservative	Leonard Mitzel	4,738	35.78%	-27.56%
Liberal	Jon Mastel	770	5.81%	-16.91%
New Democratic	Manuel Martinez	637	4.81%	0.91%
Total		13,243	–	–
Rejected, spoiled and declined		75	47	5
Eligible electors / turnout		26,199	50.85%	15.16%
Wildrose Alliance gain from Progressive Conservative		Swing		-11.40%
Source(s) Source: "55 - Cypress-Medicine Hat, 2012 Alberta general election". officialresults.elections.ab.ca. Elections Alberta.

Legislative Assembly of Alberta
Preceded by Lorne Taylor	MLA Cypress-Medicine Hat; 2004–2012	Succeeded by Drew Barnes
