= Hector Goudreau =

Canadian politician

The Honourable Hector Goudreau ECA

MLA for Dunvegan-Central Peace-Notley
- In office November 22, 2004 – May 5, 2015
- Preceded by: district created
- Succeeded by: Margaret McCuaig-Boyd

MLA for Dunvegan
- In office 2001–2004
- Preceded by: Glen Clegg
- Succeeded by: district abolished

Personal details
- Born: October 11, 1950 (age 75) Beaumont, Alberta, Canada
- Party: Progressive Conservative

Hector George Joseph Goudreau ECA (born October 11, 1950) is a politician from Alberta, Canada. He is originally from the francophone area of Beaumont, Alberta, located just south of Edmonton's metro population.

Goudreau is a former member of the Legislative Assembly of Alberta, having been elected for 2 terms as an MLA for the Progressive Conservatives. In the 2004 Alberta general election Hector narrowly hung on to his seat defeating Dale Lueken from the Alberta Alliance Party in one of the closest election battles outside of the Edmonton region.

On December 15, 2006, Hector Goudreau became Minister of Tourism, Parks, Recreation and Culture under newly elected Premier Ed Stelmach. After the election of 2008, Goudreau was named the Minister of Employment and Immigration. After Alison Redford became Premier in October 2011, Goudreau was shuffled out of Cabinet in his role as Minister of Municipal Affairs and replaced by fellow PC MLA Doug Griffiths.

Goudreau has three daughters: Micheline, Monique and Melanie. He lives in Falher with his wife Angeline.

== Controversy ==
In March 2012, Hector Goudreau received criticism after CBC News obtained a letter written by Goudreau warning a northern Alberta school division that it could lose further funding if it continued publicizing their school funding problems. Goudreau sent subsequent letters to the school division apologizing and later stepped down from his position as chair of the Cabinet Policy Committee on Community Development.

Alberta provincial government of Ed Stelmach
Cabinet post (1)
Predecessor	Office	Successor
New portfolio	Minister of Tourism, Parks, Recreation and Culture; 2006–present	Incumbent
Legislative Assembly of Alberta
Preceded by Glen Clegg	MLA Dunvegan; 2001–2004	Succeeded by District Abolished
Preceded by New District	MLA Dunvegan-Central Peace; 2004–present	Succeeded by Incumbent
