= Smoky River (electoral district) =

Defunct provincial electoral district in Alberta, Canada

Alberta electoral district

Defunct provincial electoral district
- Legislature: Legislative Assembly of Alberta
- District created: 1971
- District abolished: 1993
- First contested: 1971
- Last contested: 1989

Smoky River was a provincial electoral district in Alberta, Canada, mandated to return a single member to the Legislative Assembly of Alberta using the first-past-the-post method of voting from 1971 to 1993.

== History ==
=== Boundary history ===
The riding was created from the western part of Grouard and the eastern part of Grande Prairie in 1971. It included the communities of Valleyview and Falher. The Smoky River, which it was named after, formed most of its western boundary.

For the 1986 election, the western boundary of Smoky River was extended westward to the city limits of Grande Prairie, now including the communities of Sexsmith and Clairmont. It was abolished in 1993, with most of the riding (including Valleyview and Sexsmith) becoming part of Grande Prairie-Smoky and the northern part (including Falher) going to Dunvegan.

=== Representation history ===
Members of the Legislative Assembly for Smoky River
Assembly	Years	Member	Party
See Grande Prairie 1930-1971 and Grouard 1913-1971
17th	1971–1975	Marvin Moore	Progressive Conservative
18th	1975–1979	Marvin Moore	Progressive Conservative
19th	1979–1982	Marvin Moore	Progressive Conservative
20th	1982–1986	Marvin Moore	Progressive Conservative
21st	1986–1989	Marvin Moore	Progressive Conservative
22nd	1989–1993	Walter Paszkowski	Progressive Conservative
See Grande Prairie-Smoky after 1993 and Dunvegan 1993-2004

Smoky River was held by the Progressive Conservatives for the duration of its existence, and for all but one term, by Marvin Moore. Narrowly elected over his NDP rival when the district was created in 1971, he received consistent support thereafter. He served in several cabinet positions under Peter Lougheed and Don Getty.

When Moore decided to retire, the district was won by PC Walter Paszkowski in 1989. Smoky River was abolished at the end of his first term, but he would go on to serve as MLA for its successor riding, Grande Prairie-Smoky, and serve in the cabinet of Ralph Klein.

== Election results ==
=== 1970s ===
1971 Alberta general election
Party	Candidate	Votes	%
Progressive Conservative	Marvin Moore	2,254	38.00%
New Democratic	Victor Tardif	2,074	34.96%
Social Credit	Bernard Lamoureux	1,604	27.04%
Total valid votes		5,932	
Rejected, spoiled and declined		35	
Electors / Turnout		7,682	77.68%
Progressive Conservative pickup new district.			

1975 Alberta general election
Party	Candidate	Votes	%	±%
Progressive Conservative	Marvin Moore	3,446	60.56%	+22.56%
New Democratic	Victor Tardif	1,778	31.25%	-3.71%
Social Credit	Albert Omundson	347	6.10%	-20.94%
Liberal	John Hinks	119	2.09%	
Total valid votes		5,690		
Rejected, spoiled and declined		21		
Electors / Turnout		7,606	75.09%	-2.59%
Progressive Conservative hold		Swing		+13.14%

1979 Alberta general election
Party	Candidate	Votes	%	±%
Progressive Conservative	Marvin Moore	3,032	51.89%	-8.67%
New Democratic	Anne Hemmingway	1,743	29.83%	-1.42%
Social Credit	Bernard Lamoureux	854	14.62%	+8.52%
Liberal	Stephen Marchand	214	4.12%	+2.03%
Total valid votes		5,843		
Rejected, spoiled and declined		5		
Electors / Turnout		8,563	68.29%	-11.20%
Progressive Conservative hold		Swing		-3.63%

=== 1980s ===
1982 Alberta general election
Party	Candidate	Votes	%	±%
Progressive Conservative	Marvin Moore	3,950	58.06%	+6.17%
New Democratic	Anne Hemmingway	1,537	22.59%	-7.24%
Western Canada Concept	Andrew Blum	1,316	19.34%	
Total valid votes		6,803		
Rejected, spoiled and declined		32		
Electors / Turnout		8,895	76.84%	+8.55%
Progressive Conservative hold		Swing		+6.71%

1986 Alberta general election
Party	Candidate	Votes	%	±%
Progressive Conservative	Marvin Moore	4,793	64.91%	+6.85%
New Democratic	Martin Cree	1,546	20.94%	-1.65%
Representative	Conrad LeBlanc	773	10.47%	
Liberal	Colin Nash	272	3.68%	
Total valid votes		7,384		
Rejected, spoiled and declined		26		
Electors / Turnout		12,291	60.29%	-16.55%
Progressive Conservative hold		Swing		+4.25%

1989 Alberta general election
Party	Candidate	Votes	%	±%
Progressive Conservative	Walter Paszkowski	3,575	50.88%	-14.03%
New Democratic	Bill Termeer	1,721	24.49%	+3.55%
Liberal	Duane Dutka	1,398	19.90%	+16.22%
Social Credit	Roy Housworth	332	4.73%	
Total valid votes		7,026		
Rejected, spoiled and declined		8		
Electors / Turnout		12,169	57.80%	-2.49%
Progressive Conservative hold		Swing		-8.79%

== See also ==
- List of Alberta provincial electoral districts
- Canadian provincial electoral districts
