= Dunvegan-Central Peace =

Defunct provincial electoral district in Alberta, Canada

Alberta electoral district
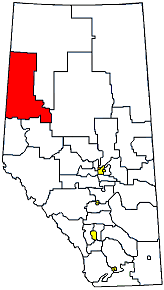
- 2004 boundaries

Defunct provincial electoral district
- Legislature: Legislative Assembly of Alberta
- District created: 2003
- District abolished: 2012
- First contested: 2004
- Last contested: 2008

Dunvegan-Central Peace was a provincial electoral district in Alberta, Canada, mandated to return a single member to the Legislative Assembly of Alberta using the first-past-the-post method of voting from 2004 to 2012.

Following the Alberta electoral boundary re-distribution of 2004, Dunvegan was the only division with a population of less than 75% the provincial average, with its recorded population of 24,202. It is thus formally designated as a special consideration division, as opposed to a standard rural division. Because of its isolation, the constituency meets criteria in the Albertan election laws allowing for this discrepancy. Until 2004, the district of Dunvegan, with almost the same boundaries.

The constituency laid on the border with British Columbia. Major towns include Fairview, Falher, Grimshaw, and Spirit River. The riding contained a large agricultural industry based on cattle farming, the border closure to live beef hurt the riding.

Peace River borders to the north and east. Lesser Slave Lake borders to the east. Grande Prairie Smoky and Grande Prairie Wapiti border to the south. Peace River South borders to the west in British Columbia

== Dunvegan-Central Peace history ==
=== Boundary history ===
1 Dunvegan-Central Peace 2003 boundaries
Bordering districts
North	East	West	South
Peace River	Peace River, Lesser Slave Lake	none	Grande Prairie-Smoky, Grande Prairie-Wapiti
riding map goes here		map in relation to other districts in Alberta goes here	
Legal description from Electoral Divisions Act, S.A. 2003, c. E-4.1
Starting at the intersection of the west boundary of the Province of Alberta and the north boundary of Twp. 104; then 1. east along the north boundary to the 6th meridian; 2. south along the meridian to the north boundary of Twp. 96; 3. west along the north boundary to the east boundary of Rge. 2 W6; 4. south along the east boundary to the north boundary of Twp. 85; 5. east along the north boundary to the 6th meridian; 6. south along the meridian to the north boundary of Twp. 83; 7. east along the north boundary of Twp. 83 to the east boundary of Rge. 23 W5; 8. south along the east boundary of Rge. 23 W5 to the north boundary of Twp. 82; 9. east along the north boundary of Twp. 82 to the right bank of the Peace River; 10. downstream along the right bank of the Peace River to the right bank of the Smoky River; 11. upstream along the right bank of the Smoky River to the north boundary of Twp. 80; 12. east along the north boundary of Twp. 80 to the east boundary of Rge. 22 W5; 13. south along the east boundary of Rge. 22 W5 to the north boundary of Sec. 18 in Twp. 80, Rge. 21 W5; 14. east along the north boundary of Secs. 18, 17, 16, 15, 14 and 13 in Rges. 21 and 20 to the east boundary of Rge. 20 W5; 15. south along the east boundary of Rge. 20 W5 to the north boundary of Twp. 78; 16. east along the north boundary to the east boundary of Sec. 31, Twp. 78, Rge. 19 W5; 17. south along the east boundary of Secs. 31, 30, 19, 18 and 7 to the north boundary of Sec. 5 in the Twp.; 18. east along the north boundary of Secs. 5, 4 and 3 to the east boundary of Sec. 3 in the Twp.; 19. south along the east boundary to the north boundary of Twp. 77; 20. east along the north boundary to the east boundary of Rge. 19 W5; 21. south along the east boundary to the north boundary of Twp. 73; 22. west along the north boundary to the east boundary of Rge. 24 W5; 23. north along the east boundary to the right bank of the Little Smoky River; 24. downstream along the right bank of the Little Smoky River to the right bank of the Smoky River; 25. upstream along the right bank of the Smoky River to the north boundary of Twp. 75; 26. west along the north boundary to the east boundary of Sec. 3 in Twp. 76, Rge. 2 W6; 27. north along the east boundary to the north boundary of Sec. 3 in the Twp.; 28. west along the north boundary of Secs. 3 and 4 to the east boundary of Sec. 5 in the Twp.; 29. south along the east boundary to the north boundary of the south half of Sec. 5 in the Twp.; 30. west along the north boundary to the east boundary of the west half of Sec. 5 in the Twp.; 31. south along the east boundary of the west half of Sec. 5 in the Twp. and east boundary of the west half of Sec. 32 in Twp. 75, Rge. 2 W6 to the north boundary of the south half of Sec. 32 in the Twp.; 32. west along the north boundary of the south half of Secs. 32 and 31 to the east boundary of the west half of Sec. 31 in the Twp.; 33. south along the east boundary to the north boundary of Sec. 30 in the Twp.; 34. west along the north boundary to the east boundary of Rge. 3 W6; 35. south along the east boundary to the north boundary of the south half of Sec. 25 in Twp. 75, Rge. 3 W6; 36. west along the north boundary of the south half of Secs. 25 and 26 to the east boundary of Sec. 27 in the Twp.; 37. south along the east boundary of Secs. 27, 22, 15, 10 and 3 in the Twp. to the north boundary of Twp. 74; 38. west along the north boundary to the east boundary of Rge. 5 W6; 39. north along the east boundary to the north boundary of Sec. 12 in Twp. 75, Rge. 5 W6; 40. west along the north boundary of Secs. 12, 11, 10, 9, 8 and 7 in Twp. 75, Rges. 5, 6 and 7 W6 and the north boundary of Secs. 12, 11 and 10 in Rge. 8 W6 to the east boundary of Sec. 16 in Twp. 75, Rge. 8 W6; 41. north along the east boundary of Secs. 16, 21, 28 and 33 in the Twp. to the north boundary of Twp. 75; 42. west along the north boundary to the east boundary of Sec. 35 in Twp. 75, Rge. 10 W6; 43. south along the east boundary to the north boundary of Sec. 26 in the Twp.; 44. west along the north boundary to the east boundary of Sec. 27 in the Twp.; 45. south along the east boundary to the north boundary of Sec. 22 in the Twp.; 46. west along the north boundary of Secs. 22, 21 and 20 to the east boundary of Sec. 19 in the Twp.; 47. south along the east boundary of Secs. 19 and 18 to the north boundary of Sec. 7 in the Twp.; 48. west along the north boundary of Sec. 7 in the Twp. and the north boundary of Sec. 12 in Twp. 75, Rge. 11 W6 to the east boundary of Sec. 11 in the Twp.; 49. south along the east boundary of Secs. 11 and 2 in the Twp. to the north boundary of Twp. 74; 50. west along the north boundary to the east boundary of Sec. 3 in Twp. 75, Rge. 12 W6; 51. north along the east boundary to the north boundary of Sec. 3 in the Twp.; 52. west along the north boundary of Secs. 3, 4 and 5 to the east boundary of Sec. 7 in the Twp.; 53. north along the east boundary to the north boundary of Sec. 7 in the Twp.; 54. west along the north boundary of Sec. 7 in the Twp. and the north boundary of Secs. 12, 11, 10, 9, 8 and 7 in Twp. 75, Rge. 13 W6 to the west boundary of the Province; 55. north along the west boundary to the starting point.
Note: District previously named Dunvegan

Members of the Legislative Assembly for Dunvegan-Central Peace
Assembly	Years	Member	Party
See Dunvegan 1986-2004
26th	2004-2008	Hector Goudreau	PC
27th	2008–2012	Hector Goudreau	PC
See Dunvegan-Central Peace-Notley 2012-2019

=== Electoral history ===
The electoral district of Dunvegan-Central peace was created from Dunvegan in the 2003 electoral boundary re-distribution. The first election in the new district was hotly contested between Progressive Conservative Hector Goudreau and Dale Lueken from the Alberta Alliance.

Lueken and Goudreau would face each other again in the 2008 general election. Goudreau easily held his seat and gained popular vote against Leuken. The construction of a nuclear power plant became a significant issue in that race.

The Dunvegan-Central Peace electoral district was dissolved following the 2010 electoral boundary re-distribution to form Dunvegan-Central Peace-Notley.

== Legislative election results ==
=== 2004 ===
2004 Alberta general election
Party	Candidate	Votes	%	±%
Progressive Conservative	Hector Goudreau	3,670	44.46%	-22.79%
Alberta Alliance	Dale Lueken	3,332	40.36%	–
Liberal	Don Thompson	689	8.35%	-13.33%
New Democratic	Leon T. Pendleton	446	5.40%	-0.43%
Social Credit	Lanny Portsmouth	118	1.43%	–
Total valid votes		8,261	–	–
Rejected, spoiled and declined		63	–	–
Electors and turnout		15,168	54.88%	-0.06%
Progressive Conservative notional hold		Swing		-31.58%
Source(s) Source: "Dunvegan-Central Peace Statement of Official Results 2004 Alberta general election" (PDF). Elections Alberta.

=== 2008 ===
2008 Alberta general election
Party	Candidate	Votes	%	±%
Progressive Conservative	Hector Goudreau	4,147	51.99%	+7.33%
Wildrose Alliance	Dale Lueken	2,339	29.33%	-11.03%
New Democratic	Nathan Macklin	1,202	15.07%	+9.67%
Liberal	Bob Woken	288	3.61%	-4.74%
Total valid votes		7,976	100.00%	–
Rejected, spoiled and declined		59	–	–
Electors and turnout		16,497	48.71%	-6.17%
Progressive Conservative hold		Swing		+9.18%
Source(s) Source: The Report on the March 3, 2008 Provincial General Election of the Twenty-seventh Legislative Assembly (PDF). Elections Alberta. July 28, 2008. pp. 171–173.

== Senate nominee election results ==
=== 2004 ===
2004 Senate nominee election results: Dunvegan-Central Peace				Turnout 53.72%	
Affiliation	Candidate	Votes	% votes	% ballots	Rank
Progressive Conservative	Betty Unger	2,407	12.57%	38.78%	2
Progressive Conservative	Bert Brown	2,328	12.15%	37.51%	1
Alberta Alliance	Gary Horan	2,192	11.44%	35.32%	10
Alberta Alliance	Vance Gough	2,180	11.38%	35.12%	8
Alberta Alliance	Michael Roth	2,103	10.98%	33.88%	7
Progressive Conservative	Cliff Breitkreuz	2,017	10.53%	32.50%	3
Independent	Link Byfield	1,989	10.38%	32.05%	4
Progressive Conservative	Jim Silye	1,437	7.50%	23.15%	5
Progressive Conservative	David Usherwood	1,350	7.05%	21.75%	6
Independent	Tom Sindlinger	1,151	6.02%	11.54%	9
Total votes		19,154	100%		
Total ballots		6,207	3.09 votes per ballot		
Rejected, spoiled and declined		1,941			
15,168 eligible electors

Voters had the option of selecting four candidates on the ballot

== 2004 student vote results ==
Participating schools
Eaglesham School
Ecole Heritage
Fairview High School
Hines Creek Composite School
Kennedy Elementary
Rycroft School
Saint Thomas More
Savanna School
Woking School

On November 19, 2004, a student vote was conducted at participating Alberta schools to parallel the 2004 Alberta general election results. The vote was designed to educate students and simulate the electoral process for persons who have not yet reached the legal majority. The vote was conducted in 80 of the 83 provincial electoral districts with students voting for actual election candidates. Schools with a large student body that reside in another electoral district had the option to vote for candidates outside of the electoral district then where they were physically located.

2004 Alberta student vote results
Affiliation	Candidate	Votes	%
Alberta Alliance	Dale Lueken	280	38.41%
Progressive Conservative	Hector Goudreau	218	29.90%
NDP	Leon Pendleton	89	12.21%
Liberal	Don Thompson	82	11.25%
Social Credit	Lanny Portsmouth	60	8.23%
Total		729	100%
Rejected, spoiled and declined		25	

== See also ==
- List of Alberta provincial electoral districts
- Canadian provincial electoral districts
