= Marvin Moore =

Canadian politician (born 1938)

The Honourable Marvin Moore ECA

Member of the Legislative Assembly of Alberta
- In office August 30, 1971 – March 20, 1989
- Preceded by: New District
- Succeeded by: Walter Paszkowski
- Constituency: Smoky River

Minister of Agriculture
- In office March 1975 – March 1979
- Preceded by: Hugh Horner
- Succeeded by: Dallas Schmidt

Minister of Municipal Affairs
- In office March 1979 – November 1982
- Preceded by: Archibald D. Johnston
- Succeeded by: Julian Koziak

Minister of Transportation
- In office November 1982 – May 1986
- Preceded by: Henry Kroeger
- Succeeded by: Al Adair

Minister of Hospitals and Medical Care
- In office May 1986 – September 8, 1988
- Preceded by: David John Russell
- Succeeded by: Nancy Betkowski

Personal details
- Born: August 31, 1938 (age 87) Grande Prairie, Alberta
- Party: Progressive Conservative

Marvin Everard Moore ECA (born August 31, 1938) is a former Canadian provincial level politician from Alberta, Canada. He served as a member of the Legislative Assembly of Alberta from 1971 to 1989. During his time in public office, he served number portfolios in the Executive Council of Alberta from 1975 to 1988.

== Political career ==
Moore ran for a seat to the Alberta Legislature for the first time in the 1971 Alberta general election. He won the new electoral district of Smoky River to pick it up for the Progressive Conservatives who would go on to form government in that election. The race for Smoky River was hotly contested with all three candidates splitting roughly a third of the vote.

Moore ran for a second term in the 1975 Alberta general election. For the second time in a row he faced off against New Democrat challenger Victor Tardif. This time Moore won a solid majority to hold the district. After the election Premier Peter Lougheed appointed Moore to his first portfolio in the Executive Council. Moore would take of as Minister of Agriculture from Hugh Horner.

He ran for re-election to his third term in the 1979 Alberta general election. His vote popularity would take a hit, but he still retained his seat by a wide margin. After the election Lougheed shuffled the cabinet. Moore became the new Minister of Municipal Affairs.

He would run for his fourth term in office in the 1982 general election. Moore would see a modest rise in his popular vote. The opposition vote split evenly between the New Democrat and Western Canada Concept candidates. He would be easily reelected on the split vote. After the election Moore was shuffled to his third portfolio. This time as the Minister of Transportation. He kept his portfolio after Don Getty became premier in 1985.

Moore would run for his final term in office in the 1986 general election. He would win the highest popular vote of his political career defeating three other candidates. Moore would be shuffled by Getty to his final portfolio and he became Minister of Hospitals and Medical Care serving until 1988. Moore retired from provincial politics at dissolution of the assembly in 1989.
