= Smoke Lake (Alberta) =

Lake in Alberta, Canada

- Location within Alberta
- Location: Municipal District of Greenview No. 16, Alberta
- Coordinates: 54°21′50″N 116°56′09″W
- Basin countries: Canada
- Max. length: 4 km (2.5 mi)
- Max. width: 4.4 km (2.7 mi)
- Surface area: 5.59 km^{2} (2.16 sq mi)
- Average depth: 5.1 m (17 ft)
- Max. depth: 8.3 m (27 ft)
- Surface elevation: 835 m (2,740 ft)
- References: Smoke Lake

Smoke Lake is a lake in northwest Alberta within the Municipal District of Greenview No. 16. It is located southwest of Fox Creek, approximately 9 km (5.6 mi) from Highway 43.

== Provincial recreation area ==
The Smoke Lake Provincial Recreation Area is located on the northeast shore of Smoke Lake.

=== Camping ===
Operated by the Town of Fox Creek, the recreation area includes a campground featuring 47 campsites and a day use site. Camping season begins on May 24 and ends on October 1.

=== Recreation ===
Other recreational activities include canoeing/kayaking, cross-country skiing, fishing, ice fishing, power boating, snowmobiling (off-site), swimming, and water-skiing.

== Fish species ==
Fish species in Smoke Lake include burbot, Iowa darter, lake whitefish, longnose sucker, northern pike, spottail shiner, trout-perch, tullibee (cisco), walleye, white sucker, and yellow perch.
