= Drew Barnes =

Canadian politician

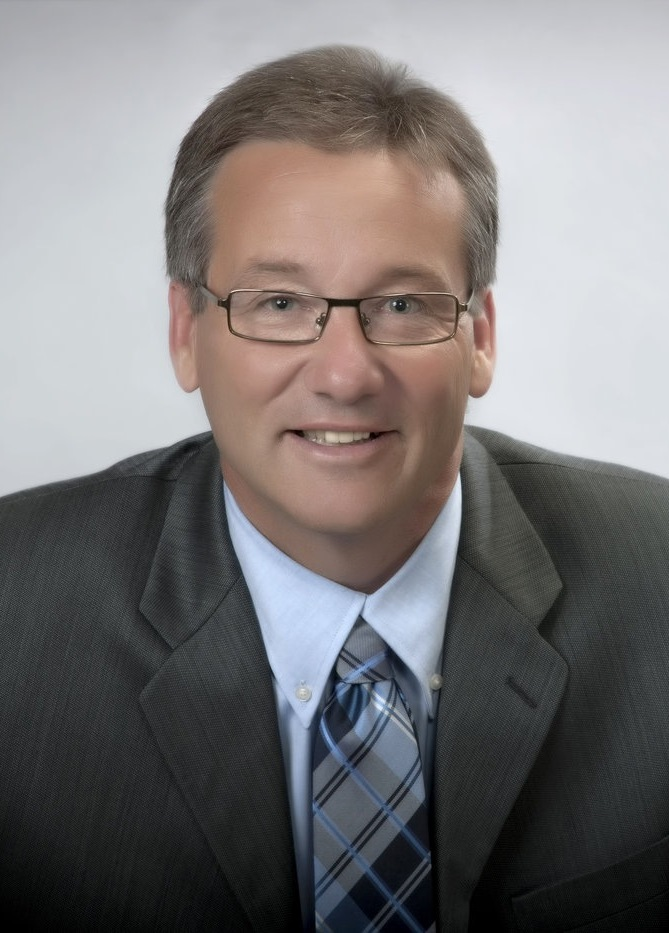

Member of the Legislative Assembly of Alberta for Cypress-Medicine Hat
- In office April 23, 2012 – May 29, 2023
- Preceded by: Len Mitzel
- Succeeded by: Justin Wright

Personal details
- Born: May 21, 1961 (age 65) Moosomin, Saskatchewan
- Party: Independent
- Other political affiliations: United Conservative (2017–2021); Wildrose (2012–2017)
- Spouse: Frances
- Children: 3
- Education: University of Alberta, Bachelor of Commerce
- Occupation: MLA, Rancher, Realtor
- Website: https://drewbarneslive.wordpress.com/

Drew Allan Roy Barnes (born May 21, 1961) is a Canadian politician who was elected in the 2012, 2015 and 2019 Alberta general elections to represent the electoral district of Cypress-Medicine Hat in the 28th, 29th and 30th Alberta Legislatures, respectively. Formerly a member of the Wildrose Party and its successor United Conservative Party, Barnes sat as an independent MLA from 2021 to 2023. He was born in Moosomin, Saskatchewan.

In the past he has been the Critic of Infrastructure and Transportation, Critic of Finance and Treasury Board, Critic of Environment and Sustainable Development, Caucus Whip, Critic of Innovation and Advanced Education, Health Critic and Energy Critic for the Wildrose Official Opposition and the UCP Official Opposition. He has served on the Standing Committees of the Alberta Heritage Trust Fund, Public Accounts, Resource Stewardship, Families and Communities, Alberta Economic Future, and Private Bills. He authored two reports, ("How to Build Alberta Better" and "On Time, On Budget", and co-authored "Twin Highway 63 Now" and "Debt Free Capital Plan".

== Biography ==
Barnes was born in Saskatchewan and moved to Medicine Hat with his family in 1974. He studied at Camrose Lutheran College and the University of Alberta, where he completed his bachelor of commerce degree.

Barnes pursued a 26-year career in real estate. He owned and managed a successful real estate office in Medicine Hat and was a member of the Medicine Hat Real Estate Board from 1983 to 2009, and served as president in 1991.

An entrepreneur and businessman, Barnes owns a number of businesses in Medicine Hat, which include a construction company, Belcore Homes, a storage facility and a property management company. He also owns commercial and residential property throughout Alberta and Saskatchewan and has irrigation and ranchland, on which he raises commercial beef, and rodeo stock.

An active member of the community, Barnes has been involved in many organizations in Medicine Hat and area. He has served as campaign chair and president of the United Way of Southeastern Alberta. A former president of the Kiwanis Club and Opportunity Capital Corporation, he is also a past member of the Kinsmen and Hockey Hounds.

In August 2012, Barnes and a colleague went on a fact finding mission to Fort McMurray to learn more about Highway 63. They called on the government to release a timeline for the completion of twinning the highway.

In late February 2015, Barnes announced he would enter the race for leader of the Wildrose Party and finished second.

On July 22, 2017, The Wildrose Party and the Progressive Conservative Party merged to become one entity, namely the United Conservative Party—both parties voted to merge with >95% approval. Barnes had been vocal about his desire to unite the entities and came forward to endorse United Conservative Party Leadership candidate, Jason Kenney, on August 2, 2017.

On May 13, 2021, Barnes and fellow UCP MLA Todd Loewen were expelled from the UCP after a caucus-wide vote after both criticized the government response to COVID-19 pandemic in Alberta.

Barnes is one of the co-founders of a federal political party focused on Alberta issues, taking inspiration from the Bloc Québécois by only running candidates in Alberta ridings.

=== Climate change controversy ===
In March 2017, Barnes donated $200.00 to a fund raiser for the research project and documentary initiated by John Robson regarding climate change. Barnes, a strong proponent of free speech and democratic reform, believes in exploring all sides of all subjects. Barnes told Global News that at no time has he ever denied climate change, but said he is interested to learn what policy options Robson might propose.

"When I go around Cypress-Medicine Hat, many people say to me that they'd like to know more about the science behind climate change. They'd like to know how big an impact man's having on it. They'd like to know why some of these other predictions haven't come true," he said.

"It's absolutely about making sure the environment is 100 per cent protected, but it’s also about making sure that our policies are the best ones and it's also about making sure Albertans have full information on both sides of the argument."

=== Fair Deal Panel ===
In June 2020, Barnes released a response to the Fair Deal Panel's recommendations in which he advocated for putting an independence referendum on the table. Barnes was one of three UCP MLA's named to the panel- The Fair Deal Panel in late 2019. The panel also consisted of six other members for a total of nine initial participants. The purpose of the panel was to host town halls around Alberta, and find out how Albertans felt about issues pertaining to Alberta's role in Canada. To develop an understanding of how Albertans saw their economic role and future security within Canada. MLA Barnes's release of a dissenting report to the final report of the initial panel has seen him accused of being a separatist by the Alberta New Democratic Party. Barnes indicated that he is not a separatist, but would be open to separation if he felt there was no other option.

== Electoral history ==
=== 2019 general election ===
2019 Alberta general election: Cypress-Medicine Hat
Party	Candidate	Votes	%	±%
United Conservative	Drew Barnes	16,483	67.06	+1.31
New Democratic	Peter Mueller	6,396	26.02	-2.82
Alberta Party	Colette Smithers	1,122	4.56	+2.89
Alberta Advantage Party	Terry Blacquier	359	1.46	–
Liberal	Anwar Kamaran	219	0.89	-0.91
Total		24,579	99.35	–
Rejected, spoiled and declined		162	0.65	
Turnout		24,741	67.60	
Eligible voters		36,597		
United Conservative notional hold		Swing		+2.06
Source(s) Source: "57 - Cypress-Medicine Hat, 2019 Alberta general election". officialresults.elections.ab.ca. Elections Alberta. Alberta. Chief Electoral Officer (2019). 2019 General Election. A Report of the Chief Electoral Officer. Volume II (PDF) (Report). Vol. 2. Edmonton, Alta.: Elections Alberta. pp. 249–254. ISBN 978-1-988620-12-1.

=== 2015 general election ===
2015 Alberta general election
Party	Candidate	Votes	%
Wildrose	Drew Barnes	8,523	54.5%
Progressive Conservative	Bob Olson	3,375	21.6%
New Democratic	Bev Waege	3,233	20.7%
Liberal	Eric Musekamp	496	3.2%
Total			
Rejected, spoiled and declined			
Eligible electors			

=== 2012 general election ===
2012 Alberta general election: Cypress-Medicine Hat
Party	Candidate	Votes	%	±%
Wildrose Alliance	Drew Barnes	7,098	53.60%	45.97%
Progressive Conservative	Leonard Mitzel	4,738	35.78%	-27.56%
Liberal	Jon Mastel	770	5.81%	-16.91%
New Democratic	Manuel Martinez	637	4.81%	0.91%
Total		13,243	–	–
Rejected, spoiled and declined		75	47	5
Eligible electors / turnout		26,199	50.85%	15.16%
Wildrose Alliance gain from Progressive Conservative		Swing		-11.40%
Source(s) Source: "55 - Cypress-Medicine Hat, 2012 Alberta general election". officialresults.elections.ab.ca. Elections Alberta.
