= Dunvegan-Central Peace-Notley =

Defunct provincial electoral district in Alberta, Canada

Alberta electoral district
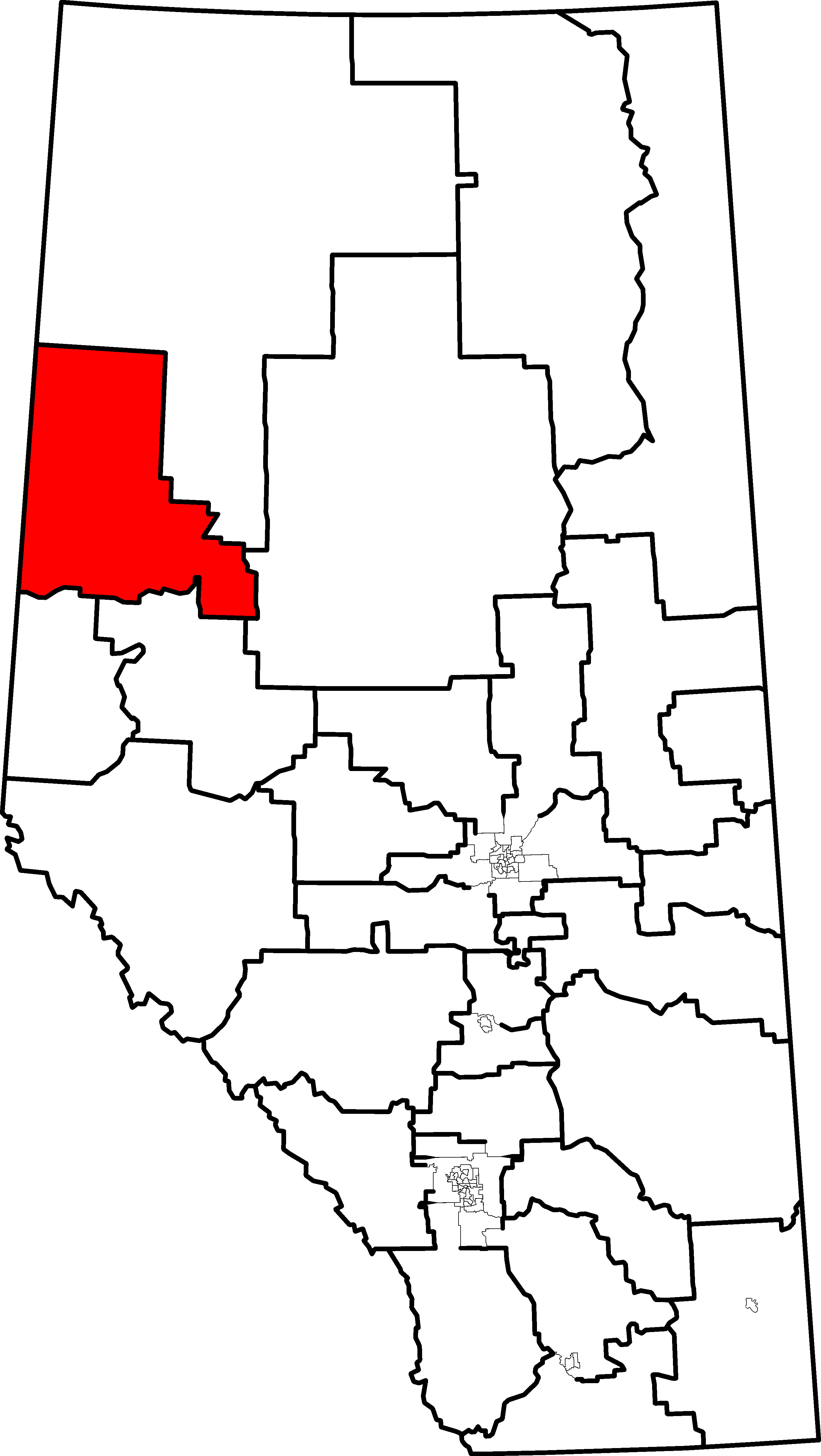
- 2010 boundaries

Defunct provincial electoral district
- Legislature: Legislative Assembly of Alberta
- District created: 2010
- District abolished: 2019
- First contested: 2012
- Last contested: 2015

Dunvegan-Central Peace-Notley was a provincial electoral district in Alberta, Canada, mandated to return a single member to the Legislative Assembly of Alberta using the first-past-the-post method of voting from 2012 to 2019.

== History ==
The electoral district was created in the 2010 electoral boundary re-distribution from the old electoral district of Dunvegan-Central Peace. The distribution saw the north end of the constituency that resided with the Municipal District of Northern Lights being redistributed to the Peace River electoral district. The electoral district is one of two in the province that is considered a special district and allowed to have less than the average population due to the lack of population and distance between communities.

The change in name came from a write-in campaign from Alberta New Democratic Party members who wanted to tack "Notley" onto the electoral district. Grant Notley was their former leader and an MLA for Spirit River-Fairview, an old electoral district that existed in the area. They pressed for the change due to other former provincial Premiers and Opposition leaders getting districts named after them such as Edmonton-Decore and Calgary-Lougheed. The Electoral Boundaries Commission refused the request, and the name change was facilitated by an amendment to the Electoral Divisions Act proposed by independent MLA Dave Taylor, which was carried by the Legislature.

=== Boundary history ===
01 Dunvegan-Central Peace-Notley 2010 Boundaries
Bordering districts
North	East	West	South
Peace River	Lesser Slave Lake	British Columbia boundary	Grande Prairie-Smoky, Grande Prairie-Wapiti
Note: Boundary descriptions were not used in the 2010 redistribution

=== Representation history ===
Members of the Legislative Assembly for Dunvegan-Central Peace-Notley
Assembly	Years	Member	Party
See Dunvegan-Central Peace 2004-2012
28th	2012–2015	Hector Goudreau	PC
29th	2015–2019	Margaret McCuaig-Boyd	NDP
See Central Peace-Notley 2019-

The former Progressive Conservative MLA Hector Goudreau served three terms in office after first being elected in the 2001 election, but after resigning as chair of the Cabinet Policy Committee on Community Development after allegations of bullying local school officials, he did not run again in the 2015 provincial election. NDP MLA Marg McCuaig-Boyd was elected in the orange wave that swept the province in the 2015 election, and served as the provincial Energy Minister.

== Election results ==
2012 Alberta general election
Party	Candidate	Votes	%	±%
Progressive Conservative	Hector Goudreau	3,981	45.14%	-6.85%
Wildrose	Kelly Hudson	3,755	42.57%	+13.24%
New Democratic	Nathan Macklin	846	9.59%	-5.48%
Liberal	Carole Carby	238	2.70%	-0.91%
Total valid votes		8,820	100.00%	–
Rejected, spoiled and declined		43	17	5
Registered voters and turnout		15,067	58.54%	+9.83%
Progressive Conservative notional hold		Swing		-10.05%
Source(s) Source: "2012 General Election Results". elections.ab.ca. Elections Alberta. May 24, 2015.

2015 Alberta general election
Party	Candidate	Votes	%	±%
New Democratic	Marg McCuaig-Boyd	3,692	38.44%	+28.85%
Wildrose	Kelly Hudson	3,147	32.76%	-9.81%
Progressive Conservative	Rhonda Clarke-Gauthier	2,766	28.80%	-16.34%
Total valid votes		9,605	100.00%	–
Rejected, spoiled and declined		16	13	3
Eligible voters / turnout		16,392	58.79%	+0.25%
New Democratic gain from Progressive Conservative		Swing		+22.60%
Source(s) "2015 General Election Results". open.alberta.ca. Elections Alberta. May 24, 2015.

== See also ==
- List of Alberta provincial electoral districts
- Canadian provincial electoral districts
