= Glen Clegg =

Canadian politician (1933–2016)

Member of the Legislative Assembly of Alberta
- In office 1986–2001
- Preceded by: district re-established
- Succeeded by: Hector Goudreau
- Constituency: Dunvegan

Personal details
- Born: October 2, 1933 Fairview, Alberta, Canada
- Died: May 20, 2016 (aged 82) Fairview, Alberta, Canada
- Party: Progressive Conservative Association of Alberta
- Occupation: farmer

Malcolm Glen Clegg (October 2, 1933 – May 20, 2016) was a civil servant and politician from Alberta, Canada. He served in the Legislative Assembly of Alberta from 1986 to 2001.

== Political career ==
Clegg was first elected to the Alberta Legislature in the 1986 general election. He defeated incumbent New Democrat Jim Gurnett by less than two hundred votes to win the reconstituted riding of Dunvegan for the Progressive Conservatives.

In the 1989 general election Clegg defeated Gurnett again, as well as Liberal candidate Gerald Eherer. In the 1993 general election he defeated Hartmann Nagel of the Liberals by just three hundred votes; the NDP finished a strong third. His margin of victory was larger in the 1997 general election; Fred Trotter of the Liberals still made a strong showing but the Liberal vote was reduced over the last election. Clegg retired from the legislature when it was dissolved in 2001.

== Later life ==
In 2002, Clegg was appointed to the Electoral Boundaries Commission. In 2004 he was appointed by Minister of Learning Lyle Oberg to the Northern Alberta Institute of Technology's board of directors as a representative of the Fairview area.
