= Todd Loewen =

Canadian politician

The Honourable Todd Loewen ECA MLA
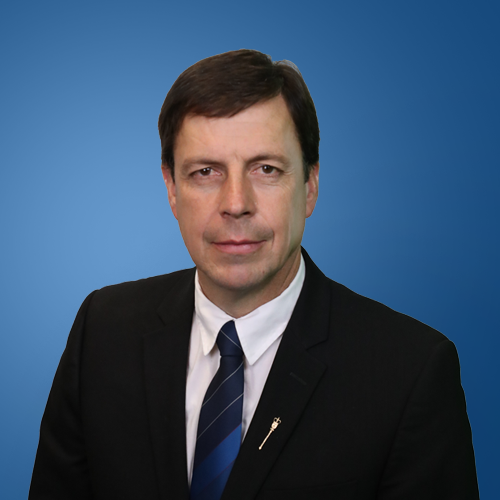

Minister of Forestry and Parks
- Incumbent
- Assumed office June 9, 2023
- Premier: Danielle Smith
- Preceded by: Himself

Minister of Forestry, Parks and Tourism
- In office October 21, 2022 – June 9, 2023
- Premier: Danielle Smith
- Preceded by: Devin Dreeshen (Forestry), Jason Nixon (Parks)
- Succeeded by: Joseph Schow (Tourism)

Member of the Legislative Assembly of Alberta for Central Peace-Notley
- Incumbent
- Assumed office April 16, 2019
- Preceded by: Marg McCuaig-Boyd

Member of the Legislative Assembly of Alberta for Grande Prairie-Smoky
- In office May 5, 2015 – April 16, 2019
- Preceded by: Everett McDonald
- Succeeded by: Riding merged

Personal details
- Born: September 16, 1966 (age 59) Alberta, Canada
- Party: United Conservative (2017-2021, 2022-present)
- Other political affiliations: Wildrose (2015-2017); Independent (2021-2022)
- Occupation: businessman, farmer

Douglas Todd Loewen ECA MLA (born September 16, 1966) is a Canadian politician and the Member of the Legislative Assembly of Alberta for Central Peace-Notley. Loewen was first elected in 2015 as a member of the Wildrose Party for the electoral district of Grande Prairie-Smoky. He was afterward elected in Central Peace-Notley as a member of the United Conservative Party and briefly sat as an independent until being welcomed back by premier Danielle Smith.

On June 1, 2022, Loewen registered his candidacy in the 2022 United Conservative Party leadership election, which was held on October 6, 2022. He finished fifth.

== Early life ==
Todd Loewen moved to the Valleyview area at a young age, in 1967, with his parents and two brothers where he lived on a farm and homestead. In 1989, Loewen purchased his own farm and started a small business. Loewen is a member of The Church of Jesus Christ of Latter-day Saints.

== Political career ==
=== Early failure (2008-2015) ===
Todd Loewen first contested a seat in the Legislative Assembly of Alberta in the 2008 Alberta general election in the Grande Prairie-Smoky electoral district as a member of the Wildrose Alliance, finishing third with 13 per cent of the vote behind Progressive Conservative incumbent Mel Knight and Liberal John Croken. Loewen, following his defeat, served as the Northern Director for the Wildrose board for two years and as one of the three members of the board on the Wildrose leadership nominating committee in 2009.

Loewen again stood as the candidate for the renamed Wildrose Party in the 2012 Alberta general election in Grande-Prairie-Smoky finishing second with 41 per cent of the vote behind Progressive Conservative and former Reeve of County of Grande Prairie Everett McDonald who captured 46 per cent of the vote.

=== MLA of 29th Alberta Legislature ===
In the 2015 Alberta general election Loewen was elected to the Legislative Assembly of Alberta for Grande Prairie-Smoky capturing 33 per cent of the vote. Loewen defeated New Democrat candidate Todd Russell (31 per cent) and incumbent Everett McDonald. After the election, Loewen was appointed as the Official Opposition's critic for Environment and Parks, a position he retained when the Wildrose Party merged with the Progressive Conservative Association of Alberta in 2017 to form the United Conservative Party (UCP). During the 29th Legislature Loewen came under public scrutiny when he insinuated New Democrat Rod Loyola received illegal election contributions from South America.

=== MLA of 30th Alberta Legislature ===
Loewen was elected in the newly formed Central Peace-Notley electoral district in the 2019 Alberta general election capturing 75 per cent of the vote, defeating former New Democrat Minister of Energy Marg McCuaig-Boyd to sit in the 30th Legislature.

In February 2021, Loewen argued for a regional based reopening strategy during the end of the second wave of the COVID-19 pandemic in Alberta. In April 2021, Loewen was one of 18 United Conservative members to sign an open letter to Premier Jason Kenney criticizing public health measures aimed to reduce the spread of COVID-19. On May 13, 2021, Loewen posted an open letter calling for Premier Jason Kenney to resign, and in the letter Loewen resigned his position as caucus chair, but did not resign from the United Conservative Party. Loewen's letter criticized Kenney's government for weak negotiations with the federal government, ignoring caucus members, delivering contradictory messages, failures in negotiations with doctors over billing, and the controversy regarding coal mining in the Eastern Slopes of the Rocky Mountains.

On May 13, 2021, Loewen and fellow UCP MLA Drew Barnes were kicked out of the UCP caucus by a caucus-wide vote after both criticized the UCP government response to COVID-19.

On June 1, 2022, Loewen registered his candidacy in the 2022 United Conservative Party leadership election, which was scheduled for October 6, 2022.

On October 6, 2022, Loewen received 7.7% of the vote. A total of 6,496 votes were cast for him in the 2022 United Conservative Party leadership election. The following day, he was readmitted into the UCP caucus.

=== MLA of 31st Alberta Legislature ===
In 2023 Loewen was elected to the 31st Alberta Legislature. He received a mandate letter for the Ministry of Forestry and Parks from Premier Danielle Smith in July 2023.

On 1 November 2023 Loewen was interviewed at the Jasper Park Lodge as part of the Alberta Forests Products Association annual general meeting. He lamented the fact that the year was a record breaker for forest fires. He promised a departmental review of the wildfire response and emphasized the value of the forestry management process in deterring catastrophic wildfires. At the time 17,000 Albertans were employed directly by the industry.

== Electoral history ==
=== 2008 general election ===
2008 Alberta general election: Grande Prairie-Smoky
Party	Candidate	Votes	%	±%
Progressive Conservative	Mel Knight	4,769	59.43%	3.01%
Liberal	John A. Croken	1,089	13.57%	-11.81%
Wildrose Alliance	Todd Loewen	1,049	13.07%	–
New Democratic	Neil R.M. Peacock	832	10.37%	1.02%
Green	Rebecca Villebrun	285	3.55%	–
Total		8,024	–	–
Rejected, spoiled and declined		31	–	–
Eligible electors / turnout		27,058	29.77%	-5.41%
Progressive Conservative hold		Swing		7.41%
Source(s) Source: The Report on the March 3, 2008 Provincial General Election of the Twenty-seventh Legislative Assembly. Elections Alberta. July 28, 2008. pp. 424–429.

=== 2012 general election ===
2012 Alberta general election: Grande Prairie-Smoky
Party	Candidate	Votes	%	±%
Progressive Conservative	Everett McDonald	5,458	45.79%	-13.64%
Wildrose	Todd Loewen	4,912	41.21%	28.14%
New Democratic	Mary Dahr	757	6.35%	-4.02%
Liberal	Kevin McLean	583	4.89%	-8.68%
Independent	Andrew Muise	209	1.75%	–
Total		11,919	–	–
Rejected, spoiled and declined		34	–	–
Eligible electors / turnout		28,126	42.50%	12.73%
Progressive Conservative hold		Swing		-20.64%
Source(s) Source: "Grande Prairie-Smoky Official Results 2012 Alberta general election". Elections Alberta.

=== 2015 general election ===
2015 Alberta general election: Grande Prairie-Smoky
Party	Candidate	Votes	%	±%
Wildrose	Todd Loewen	5,343	33.17%	-8.04%
New Democratic	Todd Russell	5,009	31.10%	24.75%
Progressive Conservative	Everett McDonald	4,968	30.84%	-14.95%
Liberal	Kevin McLean	787	4.89%	-0.01%
Total		16,107	–	–
Rejected, spoiled and declined		42	–	–
Eligible electors / turnout		32,930	49.04%	6.54%
Wildrose gain from Progressive Conservative		Swing		-1.25%
Source(s) Source: "Grande Prairie-Smoky Official Results 2015 Alberta general election". Elections Alberta.

=== 2019 general election ===
2019 Alberta general election: Central Peace-Notley
Party	Candidate	Votes	%	±%
United Conservative	Todd Loewen	10,680	75.17%	10.31%
New Democratic	Margaret McCuaig-Boyd	2,770	19.50%	-15.66%
Alberta Party	Travis McKim	651	4.58%	–
Liberal	Wayne F. Meyer	106	0.75%	–
Total		14,207	–	–
Rejected, spoiled and declined		55	37	8
Eligible electors / turnout		19,745	72.46%	–
United Conservative notional hold		Swing		+17.8%
Source(s) Source: "55 - Central Peace-Notley, 2019 Alberta general election". officialresults.elections.ab.ca. Elections Alberta.

=== 2023 general election ===
2023 Alberta general election: Central Peace-Notley
Party	Candidate	Votes	%	±%
United Conservative	Todd Loewen	9,280	77.68	+2.51
New Democratic	Megan Ciurysek	2,216	18.55	-0.95
Alberta Independence	Rodney Bowen	238	1.99	–
Alberta Party	Lynn Lekisch	166	1.39	-3.19
Solidarity Movement	Nancy O'Neill	46	0.39	–
Total		11,946	99.42	–
Rejected and declined		70	0.58	
Turnout		12,016	58.53	
Eligible voters		20,529		
United Conservative hold		Swing		+1.73
Source(s) Source: Elections Alberta
