= 26th Alberta Legislature =

Canadian Legislative Assembly

- Majority parliament
- Mar. 1, 2005 – Feb. 4, 2008

Parliament leaders
- Premier: Ralph Klein; December 14, 1992 – December 14, 2006
- Ed Stelmach; December 14, 2006 – October 7, 2011
- Cabinets: Klein cabinet Stelmach cabinet
- Leader of the Opposition: Kevin Taft; March 27, 2004 – December 14, 2008

Party caucuses
- Government: Progressive Conservative Association
- Opposition: Liberal Party
- Recognized: New Democratic Party
- Unrecognized: Wildrose Party

Legislative Assembly
- Speaker of the Assembly: Ken Kowalski; April 14, 1997 – May 23, 2012
- Government House leader: Dave Hancock; May 26, 1999 – November 24, 2006
- Gene Zwozdesky; April 6, 2006 – December 14, 2006
- Dave Hancock; December 15, 2006 – December 5, 2013
- Members: 83 MLA seats

Sovereign
- Monarch: Elizabeth II; February 6, 1952 – September 8, 2022
- Lieutenant governor: Hon. Lois Hole; February 10, 2000 – January 6, 2005
- Hon. Norman Kwong; January 20, 2005 – May 11, 2010

Sessions
- 1st session March 1, 2005 – December 1, 2005
- 2nd session February 22, 2006 – September 8, 2006
- 3rd session March 7, 2007 – December 7, 2007
- 4th session February 4, 2008 – February 4, 2008
← 25th	→ 27th

The 26th Alberta Legislative Assembly was in session from March 1, 2005, to February 4, 2008, with the membership of the assembly determined by the results of the 2004 Alberta general election held on November 22, 2004. The Legislature officially resumed on March 1, 2005, and continued until the fourth session was prorogued and dissolved on February 4, 2008, prior to the 2008 Alberta general election on March 3, 2008.

Alberta's twenty-sixth government was controlled by the majority Progressive Conservative Association of Alberta, led by Premier Ralph Klein until his resignation on December 24, 2006, after which he was succeeded by Ed Stelmach. The Official Opposition was led by Kevin Taft of the Liberal Party. The Speaker was Ken Kowalski. In the list below, cabinet members' names are bolded; leaders of official parties are italicized.

This legislature had the distinction of being addressed by Elizabeth II, Queen of Canada, to help celebrate Alberta's centennial.

== Members of the 26th Legislature by district ==
Member	Party	Constituency	First elected/ previously elected	No.# of term(s)	Notes
Carol Haley	Progressive Conservative	Airdrie-Chestermere	1993	4th term	
Mike Cardinal	Progressive Conservative	Athabasca-Redwater	1989	5th term	
**Janis Tarchuk**	Progressive Conservative	Banff-Cochrane	1997	3rd term	
Ken Kowalski †	Progressive Conservative	Barrhead-Morinville-Westlock	1979	8th term	
Doug Griffiths	Progressive Conservative	Battle River-Wainwright	2002	2nd term	
Denis Ducharme	Progressive Conservative	Bonnyville-Cold Lake	1997	3rd term	
Alana DeLong	Progressive Conservative	Calgary-Bow	2001	2nd term	
Harvey Cenaiko	Progressive Conservative	Calgary-Buffalo	2001	2nd term	
Yvonne Fritz	Progressive Conservative	Calgary-Cross	1993	4th term	
Dave Taylor	Liberal	Calgary Currie	2004	1st term	
Moe Amery	Progressive Conservative	Calgary East	1993	4th term	
Denis Herard	Progressive Conservative	Calgary-Egmont	1993	4th term	
**Ralph Klein**	Progressive Conservative	Calgary-Elbow	1989	5th term	Resigned as Premier December 14, 2006 and from legislature January 15, 2007; succeeded by Craig Cheffins as MLA for Calgary-Elbow and by Ed Stelmach as Premier.
Craig Cheffins (2007)	Liberal	Calgary-Elbow	2007	1st term	Succeeded Ralph Klein in a by-election June 12, 2007.
Heather Forsyth	Progressive Conservative	Calgary-Fish Creek	1993	4th term	
Len Webber	Progressive Conservative	Calgary-Foothills	2004	1st term	
Wayne Cao	Progressive Conservative	Calgary-Fort	1997	3rd term	
**Ron Stevens**	Progressive Conservative	Calgary-Glenmore	1997	3rd term	
Arthur Johnston	Progressive Conservative	Calgary-Hays	2004	1st term	
David Rodney	Progressive Conservative	Calgary Lougheed	2004	1st term	
Gary Mar	Progressive Conservative	Calgary-Mackay	1993	4th term	Resigned November 2007; seat left vacant until the 2008 election
Shiraz Shariff	Progressive Conservative	Calgary McCall	1995	4th term	
Hung Pham	Progressive Conservative	Calgary Montrose	1993	4th term	
David Swann	Liberal	Calgary Mountain View	2004	1st term	
Richard Magnus	Progressive Conservative	Calgary-North Hill	1993	4th term	
**Greg Melchin**	Progressive Conservative	Calgary North West	1997	3rd term	
Neil Brown	Progressive Conservative	Calgary-Nose Hill	2004	1st term	
Cindy Ady	Progressive Conservative	Calgary Shaw	2001	2nd term	
Harry B. Chase	Liberal	Calgary-Varsity	2004	1st term	
**Ron Liepert**	Progressive Conservative	Calgary-West	2004	1st term	
Paul Hinman	Alberta Alliance	Cardston-Taber-Warner	2004	1st term	The Alberta Alliance Party was dissolved, and the Wildrose Alliance Party was formed in early 2008
Paul Hinman	Wildrose Alliance	Cardston-Taber-Warner	2004	1st term	The Alberta Alliance Party was dissolved, and the Wildrose Alliance Party was formed in early 2008
Leonard Mitzel	Progressive Conservative	Cypress-Medicine Hat	2004	1st term	
Tony Abbott	Progressive Conservative	Drayton Valley-Calmar	2001	2nd term	
Shirley McClellan	Progressive Conservative	Drumheller-Stettler	1987	6th term	Resigned January 15, 2007, succeeded by Jack Hayden.
Jack Hayden (2007)	Progressive Conservative	Drumheller-Stettler	2007	1st term	Succeeded Shirley McClellan in a by-election June 12, 2007.
Hector Goudreau	Progressive Conservative	Dunvegan	2001	2nd term	
Ray Martin	NDP	Edmonton-Beverly-Clareview	1982, (Note: Edmonton-Norwood) 2004	4th term*	
David Eggen	NDP	Edmonton-Calder	2004	1st term	
Thomas Lukaszuk	Progressive Conservative	Edmonton-Castle Downs	2001	2nd term	
Laurie Blakeman	Liberal	Edmonton Centre	1997	3rd term	
Bill Bonko	Liberal	Edmonton Decore	2004	1st term	
Bharat Agnihotri	Liberal	Edmonton Ellerslie	2004	1st term	
Bruce Miller	Liberal	Edmonton-Glenora	2004	1st term	
Hugh MacDonald	Liberal	Edmonton-Gold Bar	1997	3rd term	
Brian Mason	NDP	Edmonton Highlands Norwood	2000	3rd term	
Dan Backs	Liberal	Edmonton Manning	2004	1st term	Elected as a Liberal, expelled from caucus in November 2006
Dan Backs	Independent	Edmonton Manning	2004	1st term	Elected as a Liberal, expelled from caucus in November 2006
Mo Elsalhy	Liberal	Edmonton-McClung	2004	1st term	
Maurice Tougas	Liberal	Edmonton Meadowlark	2004	1st term	
Gene Zwozdesky	Progressive Conservative	Edmonton Mill Creek	1993 (Note: First elected as a Liberal)	4th term	
Weslyn Mather	Liberal	Edmonton Mill Woods	2004	1st term	
Kevin Taft	Liberal	Edmonton Riverview	2001	2nd term	
Richard Miller	Liberal	Edmonton Rutherford	2004	1st term	
Raj Pannu	NDP	Edmonton Strathcona	1997	3rd term	
David Hancock	Progressive Conservative	Edmonton-Whitemud	1997	3rd term	
**Ted Morton**	Progressive Conservative	Foothills-Rocky View	2004	1st term	
**Guy Boutilier**	Progressive Conservative	Fort McMurray-Wood Buffalo	1997	3rd term	
**Ed Stelmach**	Progressive Conservative	Fort Saskatchewan-Vegreville	1993	4th term	
**Mel Knight**	Progressive Conservative	Grande Prairie-Smoky	2001	2nd term	
Gordon Graydon	Progressive Conservative	Grande Prairie Wapiti	2001	2nd term	
George Groeneveld	Progressive Conservative	Highwood	2004	1st term	
**Luke Ouellette**	Progressive Conservative	Innisfail-Sylvan Lake	2001	2nd term	
**Ray Danyluk**	Progressive Conservative	Lac La Biche-St. Paul	2001	2nd term	
Ray Prins	Progressive Conservative	Lacombe-Ponoka	2004	1st term	
George Rogers	Progressive Conservative	Leduc-Beaumont-Devon	2004	1st term	
Pearl Calahasen	Progressive Conservative	Lesser Slave Lake	1989	5th term	
Bridget Pastoor	Liberal	Lethbridge East	2004	1st term	
Clint Dunford	Progressive Conservative	Lethbridge-West	1993	4th term	
Barry McFarland	Progressive Conservative	Little Bow	1992	5th term	
David Coutts	Progressive Conservative	Livingstone-Macleod	1993	4th term	
**Rob Renner**	Progressive Conservative	Medicine Hat	1993	4th term	
Richard Marz	Progressive Conservative	Olds-Didsbury-Three Hills	1997	3rd term	
Frank Oberle	Progressive Conservative	Peace River	2004	1st term	
Mary Anne Jablonski	Progressive Conservative	Red Deer-North	2000	3rd term	
Victor Doerksen	Progressive Conservative	Red Deer South	1993	4th term	
Ty Lund	Progressive Conservative	Rocky Mountain House	1989	5th term	
**Iris Evans**	Progressive Conservative	Sherwood Park	1997	3rd term	
**Doug Horner**	Progressive Conservative	Spruce Grove-Sturgeon-St. Albert	2001	2nd term	
Jack Flaherty	Liberal	St. Albert	2004	1st term	
**Fred Lindsay**	Progressive Conservative	Stony Plain	2004	1st term	
Rob Lougheed	Progressive Conservative	Strathcona	1997	3rd term	
**Lyle Oberg**	Progressive Conservative	Strathmore-Brooks	1993	4th term	Suspended from P.C. caucus March 22, 2006; re-admitted July 25, 2006.
**Lyle Oberg**	Independent	Strathmore-Brooks	1993	4th term	Suspended from P.C. caucus March 22, 2006; re-admitted July 25, 2006.
**Lyle Oberg**	Progressive Conservative	Strathmore-Brooks	1993	4th term	Suspended from P.C. caucus March 22, 2006; re-admitted July 25, 2006.
**Lloyd Snelgrove**	Progressive Conservative	Vermilion-Lloydminster	2001	2nd term	
Ivan Strang	Progressive Conservative	West Yellowhead	1997	3rd term	
LeRoy Johnson	Progressive Conservative	Wetaskiwin-Camrose	1997	3rd term	
George VanderBurg	Progressive Conservative	Whitecourt-Ste. Anne	2001	2nd term	

- The Alberta Court of Appeal declared Thomas Lukaszuk the victor more than two months after the election. The election-night vote count had given Chris Kibermanis of the Liberals a five-vote win, but the judicial recount gave Lukaszuk a three-vote margin of victory.
- A party requires four seats to have official party status in the legislature. Parties with fewer than four seats are not entitled to party funding although their members will usually be permitted to sit together in the chamber.

== Notable events ==
- The province's centennial occurred during the 26th Legislature, on September 1, 2005. Earlier that year, on May 24, 2005, Elizabeth II made an official visit to the province in commemoration of the centennial.
- On March 1, 2006, premier Ralph Klein announced a series of controversial health care reforms which involved allowing greater levels of privatization in Alberta's public health care system. Later that day, the premier received significant media attention after throwing a book at a 17-year-old page.
- On March 15, 2006, and throughout the year, the Legislative Assembly celebrated the centennial of the first sitting of the Legislature.
- On April 6, 2006, Ted Morton introduced the controversial Bill 208, Protection of Fundamental Freedoms (Marriage) Statutes Amendment Act, 2006. Critics maintained that the bill removed limitations on free speech where homosexual individuals were concerned, potentially removing recourse for verbal abuse and discrimination. The bill died on the order paper on May 18, 2006.

== Standings changes during the 26th Assembly ==
Number of members per party by date	2004	2005	2006			2007			2008
Number of members per party by date	Nov 22	Feb 2	Mar 22	Jul 25	Nov 20	Jan 15	Jun 12	Sep 27	Jan 19
Progressive Conservative	61	62	61	62		60	61	60	
Liberal	17	16			15		16		
New Democratic	4								
Wildrose Alliance	0								1
Independent	0		1	0	1				
Alberta Alliance	1								0
Total members	83					81	83	82	
Vacant	0					2	0	1	
Government Majority	39	41	39	41		39		38	

1. February 2, 2005 Chris Kibermanis, Edmonton Castle Downs removed from office after a judicial recount.
2. February 2, 2005 Thomas Lukaszuk, Edmonton Castle Downs becomes the MLA by court order.
3. March 22, 2006 Lyle Oberg, Strathmore-Brooks suspended from the Progressive Conservative caucus
4. July 25, 2006 Lyle Oberg, Strathmore-Brooks rejoins the Progressive Conservatives
5. January 15, 2007 Ralph Klein, Calgary-Elbow resigns
6. January 15, 2007 Shirley McClellan, Drumheller-Stettler resigns
7. June 12, 2007 Craig Cheffins, Calgary-Elbow elected in by-election
8. June 12, 2007 Jack Hayden, Drumheller-Stettler elected in by-election
9. November 20, 2006 Dan Backs, Edmonton Manning was expelled from the Liberal caucus.
10. September 27, 2007 Gary Mar, Calgary Mackay resigns to accept a government appointment.
11. January 19, 2008 Paul Hinman, Cardston-Taber-Warner forms the Wildrose Alliance caucus.
