= Plamondon, Alberta =

Plamondon
- Hamlet
- Location within Lac la Biche County Location within Alberta
- Coordinates: 54.8497°N 112.3419°W
- Country: Canada
- Province: Alberta
- Census division: No. 12
- Municipal district: Lac La Biche County
- Settled: 1905

Government
  - Type: Unincorporated
  - Mayor: Omer Moghrabi
  - Governing body: Lac La Biche County Council: Darlene Beniuk; Colette Borgun; Sterling Johnson; George L'Heureux; Omer Moghrabi; Charlyn Moore; Jason Stedman; Lorin Tkachuk; Colin Cote

Area (2021)
  - Land: 9.65 km^{2} (3.73 sq mi)
- Elevation: 555 m (1,821 ft)

Population (2021)
  - Total: 501
- Time zone: UTC−06:00 (Alberta Time)
- Forward sortation area: T0A
- Area codes: 780, 587, 825
- Highways: Highway 858

Plamondon is a hamlet in northern Alberta, Canada within Lac La Biche County. It is located on Highway 858, approximately 3.0 km (1.9 mi) north of Highway 55, and has an elevation of 555 m (1,821 ft).

The hamlet is located in Census Division No. 12 and in the federal riding of Fort McMurray—Cold Lake.

== History ==
The community was founded by Joseph Plamondon in 1908 and settled by primarily French-American and French Canadian pioneers. Most of the families that eventually settled there came from Provemont, Michigan (now Lake Leelanau in Leelanau County, Michigan) and from French-speaking areas of Ontario. This is mentioned in a 1991 interview with Cecelia Bussey.

North of Plamondon is Rossian. Rossian is a community of Old Believers (Old Ritualists), a Traditionalist Russian Orthodox sect whose ancestors broke from the Church after Patriarch Nikon's reforms. The Great Schism of 1666, or Raskol, resulted over reforms in church ritual and translation intended to better align the practices of the Russian Church with Greek Orthodox practices. The Old Believers that live outside Plamondon are bezpopovtsy, or Priestless Old Believers, who believe that apostolic succession ended with Nikon's apostasy and therefore have no clergy and refuse the Eucharist. Most of these families moved to the area in the mid-1970s from Woodburn, Oregon, which is also home to a large Old Believer community. Many also came from Xinjiang, China, by way of New Zealand, where they fled after the Russian Revolution and the Chinese Communist Revolution.

== Demographics ==
In the 2021 Census of Population conducted by Statistics Canada, Plamondon had a population of 501 living in 195 of its 230 total private dwellings, a change of 20.4% from its 2016 population of 416. With a land area of 9.65 km^{2} (3.73 sq mi), it had a population density of 51.9/km^{2} (134.5/sq mi) in 2021.

As a designated place in the 2016 Census of Population conducted by Statistics Canada, Plamondon had a population of 348 living in 136 of its 172 total private dwellings, a change of 0.9% from its 2011 population of 345. With a land area of 1.96 km^{2} (0.76 sq mi), it had a population density of 177.6/km^{2} (459.9/sq mi) in 2016.

Lac La Biche County's 2016 municipal census counted a population of 348 in Plamondon, a 1.2% change from the hamlet's 2013 municipal census population of 344.

Plamondon is also home for a sizable community of Russian Orthodox Old Believers.

== Economy ==
The main industries in the region are logging and farming.

== Amenities ==
The community has two schools, Ecole Beausejour and Ecole Plamondon School, which draw students from the entire region. École Plamondon School, offers English, French immersion, and Russian classes. École Beausejour is a francophone school, with instruction surrounding with the francophone culture.

There are two hotels, two banks, post office, indoor hockey arena with artificial ice, a museum, and a rather large church.

The hamlet also holds an annual French hockey tournament called Hockey en Fête. Frontenacs of University of Alberta have won twice.

== Attractions ==
Plamondon features several attractions that reflect its strong French Canadian and Métis heritage. The Plamondon Museum showcases the history of the community's early French-speaking pioneers, their traditions, and the development of the surrounding area. The museum's exhibits highlight Métis culture, the history of trapping, local musical talents, spiritual life, and the bilingual identity that continues to define Plamondon today.

Nearby, the Mini Parc Heritage Park offers a walking trail lined with miniature replicas of early homesteads.

The Plamondon Whitesands Resort is a lakeside recreation area featuring a campground, driving range, and beach facilities. It hosts seasonal events and provides amenities for both visitors and local residents.

Plamondon also hosts the annual community event, the Plamondon Mud Bogs, an off-road racing festival that draws participants and spectators from across the region.

== Notable people ==
- Colin Piquette, former member of the Legislative Assembly of Alberta for Athabasca-Sturgeon-Redwater
- Leo Piquette, former member of the Legislative Assembly of Alberta for Athabasca-Lac La Biche
- Clara Plamondon, Anglican bishop
- Crystal Plamondon, performing artist

== See also ==
- List of communities in Alberta
- List of designated places in Alberta
- List of former urban municipalities in Alberta
- List of hamlets in Alberta
