= Lac La Biche =

Lac La Biche may refer to:

- Lac La Biche, Alberta, a hamlet (formerly a town) in northeastern Alberta,
- Lac La Biche County, the specialized municipality comprising the former town and the former Lakeland County,
- Lac la Biche (Alberta), the lake adjacent to the community, or
- Lac La Biche Airport, an airport within Lac La Biche County.

Several provincial electoral districts have also borne the name:

- Lac La Biche (provincial electoral district), from 1952 to 1971,
- Lac La Biche-McMurray, from 1971 to 1986,
- Athabasca-Lac La Biche, from 1986 to 1993,
- Lac La Biche-St. Paul, from 1993 to 2012,
- Lac La Biche-St. Paul-Two Hills, from 2012 to 2019,
- Fort McMurray-Lac La Biche, from 2019 to present.
