= 27th Alberta Legislature =

Canadian Legislative Assembly

- Majority parliament
- Apr. 14, 2008 – Mar. 26, 2012

Parliament leaders
- Premier: Ed Stelmach; December 14, 2006 – October 7, 2011
- Alison Redford; October 7, 2011 – March 23, 2014
- Cabinets: Stelmach cabinet Redford cabinet
- Leader of the Opposition: David Swann; December 15, 2008 – September 10, 2011
- Raj Sherman; September 12, 2011 – April 23, 2012

Party caucuses
- Government: Progressive Conservative Association
- Opposition: Liberal Party
- Recognized: Wildrose Party
- New Democratic Party
- Unrecognized: Alberta Party

Legislative Assembly
- Speaker of the Assembly: Ken Kowalski; April 14, 1997 – May 23, 2012
- Government House leader: Dave Hancock; March 12, 2008 – September 5, 2013
- Members: 83 MLA seats

Sovereign
- Monarch: Elizabeth II; February 6, 1952 – September 8, 2022
- Lieutenant governor: Hon. Norman Kwong; January 20, 2005 – May 11, 2010
- Hon. Donald Ethell; May 11, 2010 – June 12, 2015

Sessions
- 1st session April 14, 2008 – December 4, 2008
- 2nd session February 10, 2009 – November 26, 2009
- 3rd session February 4, 2010 – December 2, 2010
- 4th session February 22, 2011 – December 8, 2011
- 5th session February 7, 2012 – March 22, 2012
| ← 26th | → 28th |

The 27th Alberta Legislative Assembly was in session from April 14, 2008, to March 26, 2012, with the membership of the assembly determined by the results of the 2008 Alberta general election held on March 3, 2008. The Legislature officially resumed on April 14, 2008, and continued until the fifth session was prorogued on March 22, 2012, and dissolved on March 26, 2012, prior to the 2012 Alberta general election on April 23, 2012.

Alberta's twenty-sixth government was controlled by the majority Progressive Conservative Association of Alberta, led by Premier Ed Stelmach until his resignation on October 7, 2011, where he was succeeded by Alison Redford. The Official Opposition was led by David Swann of the Liberal Party, and later Raj Sherman. The Speaker was Ken Kowalski.

== Election aftermath ==
The result of the 2008 election resulted in the Progressive Conservative party strengthening their ranks and picking up many districts. The results had fooled most of the pundits who were predicting quite the opposite.

Premier Ed Stelmach shuffled the Cabinet on March 13, 2008. The more notable members of his cabinet included Ron Liepert, Lindsay Blackett and Mel Knight. The opposition criticized Stelmach for not reducing the size of cabinet which had become bloated to record levels.

== 1st Session ==
The first session of the 27th Alberta Legislature began on April 14, 2008, with the re-election of Ken Kowalski as speaker of the assembly defeating Laurie Blakeman on the first ballot.

The first throne speech during the assembly was read by Normie Kwong the next day. The first session was marked by a number of initiatives that cast the government in a negative light.

== No Meet Committee ==
In March 2012 it came to light that the "Select Standing Committee on Privileges and Elections, Standing Orders and Printing", a committee of the Legislative Assembly had not sat for over three years, despite each member of the committee receiving a $1,000 stipend. The committee was chaired by Ray Prins, a backbench Progressive Conservative MLA for Lacombe-Ponoka who received an additional $38,000 per year for the appointment. The committee's 21 members included individuals from all political parities in the Assembly. In response, Premier Alison Redford instituted a freeze on committee pay and announced members would have to return six months of pay. After public criticism continued, Redford ordered all Progressive Conservative MLAs to pay back all pay received since the committee last met.

== Budget ==
=== Budget 2012 ===
Budget 2012: Investing in People was presented in the legislature by Minister of Finance Ron Liepert on February 9, 2012. The budget projected CA$40.3-billion in revenue, with $41.1-billion in expenses and a total deficit of $886-million. The budget would outline government direction towards results-based budgeting and reviews of all government programs and services, and lay the groundwork for three-year funding cycles for municipalities, school boards and post-secondary institutions. The budget projected a path to balance in the next fiscal year, with a projected surplus of $952-million. The projected economic growth for 2012 in Alberta was 3.8%, and West Texas Intermediate benchmark at USD$99.25 per barrel.

== Membership in the 27th Alberta Legislative Assembly ==
| Member | Party | Constituency | First elected/ previously elected | No.# of term(s) |
|---|---|---|---|---|
| Rob Anderson | Progressive Conservative | Airdrie-Chestermere | 2008 | 1st term |
| Rob Anderson | Wildrose Alliance | Airdrie-Chestermere | 2008 | 1st term |
| Jeff Johnson | Progressive Conservative | Athabasca-Redwater | 2008 | 1st term |
| Janis Tarchuk | Progressive Conservative | Banff-Cochrane | 1997 | 4th term |
| Ken Kowalski | Progressive Conservative | Barrhead-Morinville-Westlock | 1979 | 9th term |
| Doug Griffiths | Progressive Conservative | Battle River-Wainwright | 2002 | 3rd term |
| Genia Leskiw | Progressive Conservative | Bonnyville-Cold Lake | 2008 | 1st term |
| Alana DeLong | Progressive Conservative | Calgary-Bow | 2001 | 3rd term |
| Kent Hehr | Liberal | Calgary-Buffalo | 2008 | 1st term |
| Yvonne Fritz | Progressive Conservative | Calgary-Cross | 1993 | 5th term |
| Dave Taylor | Liberal | Calgary-Currie | 2004 | 2nd term |
| Dave Taylor | Independent | Calgary-Currie | 2004 | 2nd term |
| Dave Taylor | Alberta Party | Calgary-Currie | 2004 | 2nd term |
| Moe Amery | Progressive Conservative | Calgary-East | 1993 | 5th term |
| Jonathan Denis | Progressive Conservative | Calgary-Egmont | 2008 | 1st term |
| Alison Redford | Progressive Conservative | Calgary-Elbow | 2008 | 1st term |
| Heather Forsyth | Progressive Conservative | Calgary-Fish Creek | 1993 | 5th term |
| Heather Forsyth | Wildrose Alliance | Calgary-Fish Creek | 1993 | 5th term |
| Len Webber | Progressive Conservative | Calgary Foothills | 2004 | 2nd term |
| Wayne Cao | Progressive Conservative | Calgary-Fort | 1997 | 4th term |
| Ron Stevens (Until July 18, 2009) | Progressive Conservative | Calgary-Glenmore | 1997 | 4th term |
| Paul Hinman (From September 14, 2009) | Wildrose Alliance | Calgary-Glenmore | 2004, (Note: Cardston-Taber-Warner) 2009 | 2nd term* |
| Arthur Johnston | Progressive Conservative | Calgary-Hays | 2004 | 2nd term |
| David Rodney | Progressive Conservative | Calgary Lougheed | 2004 | 2nd term |
| Teresa Woo-Paw | Progressive Conservative | Calgary Mackay | 2008 | 1st term |
| Darshan Kang | Liberal | Calgary-McCall | 2008 | 1st term |
| Manmeet Bhullar | Progressive Conservative | Calgary-Montrose | 2008 | 1st term |
| David Swann | Liberal | Calgary-Mountain View | 2004 | 2nd term |
| Kyle Fawcett | Progressive Conservative | Calgary-North Hill | 2008 | 1st term |
| Lindsay Blackett | Progressive Conservative | Calgary-North West | 2008 | 1st term |
| Neil Brown | Progressive Conservative | Calgary-Nose Hill | 2004 | 2nd term |
| Cindy Ady | Progressive Conservative | Calgary-Shaw | 2001 | 3rd term |
| Harry B. Chase | Liberal | Calgary-Varsity | 2004 | 2nd term |
| Ron Liepert | Progressive Conservative | Calgary West | 2004 | 2nd term |
| Broyce Jacobs | Progressive Conservative | Cardston-Taber-Warner | 2001, 2008 | 2nd term* |
| Leonard Mitzel | Progressive Conservative | Cypress-Medicine Hat | 2004 | 2nd term |
| Diana McQueen | Progressive Conservative | Drayton Valley-Calmar | 2008 | 1st term |
| Jack Hayden | Progressive Conservative | Drumheller-Stettler | 2007 | 2nd term |
| Hector Goudreau | Progressive Conservative | Dunvegan | 2001 | 3rd term |
| Tony Vandermeer | Progressive Conservative | Edmonton Beverly Clareview | 2001, (Note: Edmonton-Manning) 2008 | 2nd term* |
| Doug Elniski | Progressive Conservative | Edmonton-Calder | 2008 | 1st term |
| Thomas Lukaszuk | Progressive Conservative | Edmonton-Castle Downs | 2001 | 3rd term |
| Laurie Blakeman | Liberal | Edmonton-Centre | 1997 | 4th term |
| Janice Sarich | Progressive Conservative | Edmonton Decore | 2008 | 1st term |
| Naresh Bhardwaj | Progressive Conservative | Edmonton-Ellerslie | 2008 | 1st term |
| Heather Klimchuk | Progressive Conservative | Edmonton-Glenora | 2008 | 1st term |
| Hugh MacDonald | Liberal | Edmonton-Gold Bar | 1997 | 4th term |
| Brian Mason | NDP | Edmonton-Highlands-Norwood | 2000 | 4th term |
| Peter Sandhu | Progressive Conservative | Edmonton Manning | 2008 | 1st term |
| David Xiao | Progressive Conservative | Edmonton McClung | 2008 | 1st term |
| Raj Sherman | Progressive Conservative | Edmonton Meadowlark | 2008 | 1st term |
| Raj Sherman | Independent | Edmonton Meadowlark | 2008 | 1st term |
| Raj Sherman | Independent Liberal | Edmonton Meadowlark | 2008 | 1st term |
| Raj Sherman | Liberal | Edmonton Meadowlark | 2008 | 1st term |
| Gene Zwozdesky | Progressive Conservative | Edmonton Mill Creek | 1993 (Note: First elected as a Liberal) | 5th term |
| Carl Benito | Progressive Conservative | Edmonton-Mill Woods | 2008 | 1st term |
| Kevin Taft | Liberal | Edmonton-Riverview | 2001 | 3rd term |
| Fred Horne | Progressive Conservative | Edmonton-Rutherford | 2008 | 1st term |
| Rachel Notley | NDP | Edmonton Strathcona | 2008 | 1st term |
| Dave Hancock | Progressive Conservative | Edmonton-Whitemud | 1997 | 4th term |
| Ted Morton | Progressive Conservative | Foothills-Rocky View | 2004 | 2nd term |
| Guy Boutilier | Progressive Conservative | Fort McMurray-Wood Buffalo | 1997 | 4th term |
| Guy Boutilier | Independent | Fort McMurray-Wood Buffalo | 1997 | 4th term |
| Guy Boutilier | Independent Wildrose Alliance | Fort McMurray-Wood Buffalo | 1997 | 4th term |
| Guy Boutilier | Wildrose | Fort McMurray-Wood Buffalo | 1997 | 4th term |
| Ed Stelmach | Progressive Conservative | Fort Saskatchewan-Vegreville | 1993 | 5th term |
| Mel Knight | Progressive Conservative | Grande Prairie Smoky | 2001 | 3rd term |
| Wayne Drysdale | Progressive Conservative | Grande Prairie Wapiti | 2008 | 1st term |
| George Groeneveld | Progressive Conservative | Highwood | 2004 | 2nd term |
| Luke Ouellette | Progressive Conservative | Innisfail-Sylvan Lake | 2001 | 3rd term |
| Ray Danyluk | Progressive Conservative | Lac La Biche-St. Paul | 2001 | 3rd term |
| Ray Prins | Progressive Conservative | Lacombe-Ponoka | 2004 | 2nd term |
| George Rogers | Progressive Conservative | Leduc-Beaumont-Devon | 2004 | 2nd term |
| Pearl Calahasen | Progressive Conservative | Lesser Slave Lake | 1989 | 6th term |
| Bridget Pastoor | Liberal | Lethbridge-East | 2004 | 2nd term |
| Bridget Pastoor | Progressive Conservative | Lethbridge-East | 2004 | 2nd term |
| Greg Weadick | Progressive Conservative | Lethbridge-West | 2008 | 1st term |
| Barry McFarland | Progressive Conservative | Little Bow | 1992 | 6th term |
| Evan Berger | Progressive Conservative | Livingstone-Macleod | 2008 | 1st term |
| Rob Renner | Progressive Conservative | Medicine Hat | 1993 | 5th term |
| Richard Marz | Progressive Conservative | Olds-Didsbury-Three Hills | 1997 | 4th term |
| Vacant | | Olds-Didsbury-Three Hills | 1997 | 4th term |
| Frank Oberle | Progressive Conservative | Peace River | 2004 | 2nd term |
| Mary Anne Jablonski | Progressive Conservative | Red Deer North | 2000 | 4th term |
| Cal Dallas | Progressive Conservative | Red Deer South | 2008 | 1st term |
| Ty Lund | Progressive Conservative | Rocky Mountain House | 1989 | 6th term |
| Iris Evans | Progressive Conservative | Sherwood Park | 1997 | 4th term |
| Doug Horner | Progressive Conservative | Spruce Grove-Sturgeon-St. Albert | 2001 | 3rd term |
| Ken Allred | Progressive Conservative | St. Albert | 2008 | 1st term |
| Fred Lindsay | Progressive Conservative | Stony Plain | 2004 | 2nd term |
| Dave Quest | Progressive Conservative | Strathcona | 2008 | 1st term |
| Arno Doerksen | Progressive Conservative | Strathmore-Brooks | 2008 | 1st term |
| Lloyd Snelgrove | Progressive Conservative | Vermilion-Lloydminster | 2001 | 3rd term |
| Lloyd Snelgrove | Independent | Vermilion-Lloydminster | 2001 | 3rd term |
| Robin Campbell | Progressive Conservative | West Yellowhead | 2008 | 1st term |
| Verlyn Olson | Progressive Conservative | Wetaskiwin-Camrose | 2008 | 1st term |
| George VanderBurg | Progressive Conservative | Whitecourt-Ste. Anne | 2001 | 3rd term |

== Seating plan ==
| | Allred | Sandhu | Xiao | Anderson | Forsyth | Leskiw |
| | McQueen | Fawcett | Dallas | Denis | Johnson | Doerksen | Quest | | Taft | Pastoor | | Chase | Kang |
| | Cao | Mitzel | Johnston | Weadick | Drysdale | Brown | Vandermeer | | MacDonald | Taylor | Swann | Blakeman | Hehr | | | Mason | Notley |
Kowalski
| | Ady | Groenveld | Redford | Ouellette | Knight | Horner | Evans | Snelgrove | Stelmach | Hancock | Liepert | Renner | Zwozdesky | Tarchuk | Goudreau | Morton | Lindsay |
| | Boutilier | Marz | Olson | Rogers | Webber | Klimchuk | Blackett | Campbell | | Oberle | Fritz | Hayden | Danyluk | Jablonski | Prins | Horne | Sarich |
| Berger | Lund | VanderBurg | McFarland | Rodney | Bhardwaj | Woo-Paw | Bhullar | DeLong | | Griffiths | Lukaszuk | Calahasen | Sherman | Elniski | Amery | Benito | Jacobs |

Official Seating Plan (Retrieved December 9, 2009)

== Standings changes during the 27th Assembly ==
| Number of members per party by date | 2008 | 2009 | | | 2010 | | | | | 2011 | | | | 2012 | |
| Number of members per party by date | Mar 3 | May 15 | Jul 18 | Sep 14 | Jan 4 | Apr 12 | Jun 24 | Oct 25 | Nov 22 | Jan 24 | Mar 15 | Sep 12 | Nov 21 | Jan 27 | Mar |
|---|---|---|---|---|---|---|---|---|---|---|---|---|---|---|---|
| Progressive Conservative | 72 | 71 | 70 | | 68 | | | | 67 | | | | 68 | 67 | 66 |
| Liberal | 9 | | | | | 8 | | | | | | 9 | 8 | | |
| Wildrose | 0 | | | 1 | 3 | | | 4 | | | | | | | |
| New Democratic | 2 | | | | | | | | | | | | | | |
| Alberta Party | 0 | | | | | | | | | 1 | | | | | |
| Independent | 0 | | 1 | | | 2 | 1 | | 2 | 1 | 0 | | | 1 | |
| Independent Liberal | 0 | | | | | | | | | | 1^{2} | 0 | | | |
| Independent Wildrose Alliance | 0 | | | | | | 1^{1} | 0 | | | | | | | |
| Total members | 83 | 82 | | 83 | | | | | | | | | | | 82 |
| Vacant | 0 | 1 | | 0 | | | | | | | | | | | 1 |
| Government Majority | 61 | 60 | 58 | 57 | 53 | | | | 51 | | | | 53 | 51 | 50 |

1. Guy Boutilier began caucusing with the Wildrose Alliance on June 24, 2010, but kept independent status due to a $40,000.00 difference in private members research funding.
2. Raj Sherman joined the Liberal party, but did not officially join the Liberal caucus, however, he did become the Liberal leader on September 10, 2011.

Membership changes in the 27th Assembly
| Date | Name | District | Party | Reason |
|---|---|---|---|---|
| March 3, 2008 | See List of Members | | | Election day of the 27th Alberta general election |
| May 15, 2009 | Ron Stevens | Calgary-Glenmore | Progressive Conservative | Resigned seat to accept a judicial appointment. |
| July 18, 2009 | Guy Boutilier | Fort McMurray-Wood Buffalo | Independent | Removed from the Progressive Conservative caucus. |
| September 14, 2009 | Paul Hinman | Calgary-Glenmore | Wildrose Alliance | Elected in a by-election. |
| January 4, 2010 | Rob Anderson | Airdrie-Chestermere | Wildrose Alliance | Crossed the floor from the Progressive Conservative caucus |
| January 4, 2010 | Heather Forsyth | Calgary-Fish Creek | Wildrose Alliance | Crossed the floor from the Progressive Conservative caucus |
| April 12, 2010 | Dave Taylor | Calgary-Currie | Independent | Left Liberal caucus to sit as an Independent. |
| June 24, 2010 | Guy Boutilier | Fort McMurray-Wood Buffalo | Independent Wildrose Alliance | Joined the Wildrose Alliance as an Independent. |
| October 25, 2010 | Guy Boutilier | Fort McMurray-Wood Buffalo | Wildrose Alliance | Fully joined Wildrose Alliance caucus |
| November 22, 2010 | Raj Sherman | Edmonton-Meadowlark | Independent | Removed from Progressive Conservative caucus |
| January 24, 2011 | Dave Taylor | Calgary-Currie | Alberta Party | Joined Alberta Party |
| March 15, 2011 | Raj Sherman | Edmonton-Meadowlark | Independent Liberal | Joined the Liberal Party, but not the caucus. |
| June 26, 2011 | See List of Members | | Wildrose | Caucus name changed from Wildrose Alliance to Wildrose |
| September 12, 2011 | Raj Sherman | Edmonton-Meadowlark | Liberal | Joined the Liberal caucus. |
| November 21, 2011 | Bridget Pastoor | Lethbridge-East | Progressive Conservative | Crossed the floor from the Liberal caucus |
| January 27, 2012 | Lloyd Snelgrove | Vermilion-Lloydminster | Independent | Left the Progressive Conservative caucus due to issues with Premier Redford. |
| March 2012 | Richard Marz | Olds-Didsbury-Three Hills | Progressive Conservative | Vacated seat |
