= Athabasca-Wabasca =

Defunct provincial electoral district in Alberta, Canada

Alberta electoral district

Defunct provincial electoral district
- Legislature: Legislative Assembly of Alberta
- District created: 1993
- District abolished: 2003
- First contested: 1993
- Last contested: 2001

Athabasca-Wabasca was a provincial electoral district in Alberta, Canada, mandated to return a single member to the Legislative Assembly of Alberta using first-past-the-post balloting from 1993 to 2004.

== District history ==
The riding was created in 1993 when the district of Fort McMurray shrank to encompass the northern Alberta city. Athabasca-Wabasca completely covered the same boundaries except for Fort McMurray. The riding was abolished in the 2004 electoral boundary re-distribution when the district of Fort McMurray merged and formed Fort McMurray-Wood Buffalo. The south part of the riding became part of Athabasca-Redwater.

The riding encompassed most of the extreme north east part of the province.

=== Members of the Legislative Assembly (MLAs) ===
Members of the Legislative Assembly for Athabasca-Wabasca
Assembly	Years	Member	Party
See Fort McMurray electoral district from 1986–1993
23rd	1993–1997	Mike Cardinal	Progressive Conservative
24th	1997–2001	Mike Cardinal	Progressive Conservative
25th	2001–2004	Mike Cardinal	Progressive Conservative
See Fort McMurray-Wood Buffalo electoral district from 2004–Present and Athabasca-Redwater electoral district from 2004–2012

== Election results ==
=== 1993 ===
1993 Alberta general election
Party	Candidate	Votes	%	±%
Progressive Conservative	Mike Cardinal	4,144	59.99%	–
Liberal	Simon Waquan	1,921	27.81%	–
New Democratic	Emil Zachkewich	843	12.20%	–
Total		6,908	–	–
Rejected, spoiled and declined		31	–	–
Eligible electors / turnout		11,165	62.15%	–
Progressive Conservative pickup new district.				
Source(s) Source: "Athabasca-Wabasca Official Results 1993 Alberta general election". Alberta Heritage Community Foundation.

=== 1997 ===
1997 Alberta general election
Party	Candidate	Votes	%	±%
Progressive Conservative	Mike Cardinal	3,380	59.00%	-0.99%
Liberal	Tony Mercredi	1,481	25.85%	-1.96%
Social Credit	Curtis Gunderson	468	8.17%	–
New Democratic	Dean Patriquin	300	5.24%	-6.97%
Greens	Harlan Light	100	1.75%	–
Total		5,729	–	–
Rejected, spoiled and declined		34	–	–
Eligible electors / turnout		12,009	47.99%	–
Progressive Conservative hold		Swing		0.48%
Source(s) Source: "Athabasca-Wabasca Official Results 1997 Alberta general election". Alberta Heritage Community Foundation.

=== 2001 ===
2001 Alberta general election
Party	Candidate	Votes	%	±%
Progressive Conservative	Mike Cardinal	4,238	66.69%	7.69%
Liberal	Al Wurfel	1,264	19.89%	-5.96%
New Democratic	Colin Piquette	606	9.54%	4.30%
Social Credit	David Klassen	153	2.41%	-5.76%
Greens	Ian Hopfe	94	1.48%	-0.27%
Total		6,355	–	–
Rejected, spoiled and declined		6	–	–
Eligible electors / turnout		12,622	50.40%	–
Progressive Conservative hold		Swing		6.83%
Source(s) Source: "Athabasca-Wabasca Official Results 2001 Alberta general election". Alberta Heritage Community Foundation.

== See also ==
- List of Alberta provincial electoral districts
- Canadian provincial electoral districts
