= Athabasca-Redwater =

Defunct provincial electoral district in Alberta, Canada

Alberta electoral district
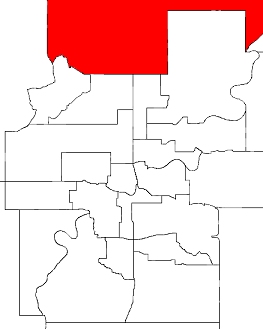
- 2004 boundaries

Defunct provincial electoral district
- Legislature: Legislative Assembly of Alberta
- District created: 2004
- District abolished: 2012
- First contested: 2004
- Last contested: 2008

Athabasca-Redwater was a provincial electoral district in Alberta, Canada, from 2004 to 2012. It was mandated to return a single member to the Legislative Assembly of Alberta using the first-past-the-post method of voting.

The district in rural northern Alberta was created in the 2004 boundary redistribution out of a large portion of Barrhead-Westlock and Athabasca-Wabasca in the north as well as a portion of Redwater on the eastern side. The district had three major towns: Bon Accord, Redwater, and Athabasca.

The district and its antecedents favoured Progressive Conservative candidates in recent years. There were two representatives in the district.

== History ==
The Athabasca-Redwater electoral district was created in the 2003 electoral boundary re-distribution from parts of the electoral districts of Athabasca-Wabasca, Barrhead-Westlock, and Redwater.

The 2010 electoral boundary re-distribution saw the electoral district change to align to new municipal boundaries on the northern and western edges. The electoral district was renamed Athabasca-Sturgeon-Redwater. The change in name and boundaries took effect at the drop of the writ for the 2012 Alberta general election.

=== Boundary history ===
44 Athabasca-Redwater 2003 boundaries
Bordering districts
North	East	West	South
Lesser Slave Lake, Lac La Biche-St. Paul	Lac La Biche-St. Paul	Barrhead-Morinville-Westlock, Lesser Slave Lake, Spruce Grove-Sturgeon-St. Albert	Edmonton-Castle Downs, Edmonton-Decore, Edmonton-Manning, Fort Saskatchewan-Vegreville, St. Albert
		map in relation to other districts in Alberta goes here	
Legal description from Electoral Divisions Act, S.A. 2003, c. E-4.1
Starting at the intersection of the north boundary of Twp. 75 and the east boundary of Rge. 26 W4; then 1. east along the north boundary to the east boundary of Rge. 16 W4; 2. south along the east boundary of Rge. 16 to the north boundary of Sec. 13, Twp. 69, Rge 16 W4; 3. west along the north boundary of Secs. 13, 14, 15, 16, 17 and 18 to the east boundary of Rge. 17 W4; 4. south along the east boundary of Rge. 17 to the north boundary of the Buffalo Lake Métis Settlement (at the north boundary of Twp. 64); 5. west and south along the Métis Settlement boundary to the north boundary of Sec. 13 in Twp. 63, Rge. 18 W4; 6. south along the east boundary of Secs. 13, 12 and 1 to the north boundary of Twp. 62; 7. west along the north boundary of Twp. 62 to the east boundary of Sec. 34 in Twp. 62, Rge. 18 W4; 8. south along the east boundary of Secs. 34, 27, 22, 15, 10 and 3 to the north boundary of Twp. 61; 9. east along the north boundary to the east boundary of Rge. 16 W4; 10. south along the east boundary of Rge. 16 W4 to the right bank of the North Saskatchewan River; 11. upstream along the right bank to the Edmonton city boundary; 34. west along the north boundary of Twp. 68 to the east boundary of Rge. 26 W4; 35. north along the east boundary of Rge. 26 W4 to the starting point.

=== Representation history ===
Members of the Legislative Assembly for Athabasca-Redwater
Assembly	Years	Member	Party
See Athabasca-Wabasca 1993-2004, Barrhead-Westlock 1993-2004 and Redwater 1993-2004
26th	2004–2008	Mike Cardinal	Progressive Conservative
27th	2008–2012	Jeff Johnson	Progressive Conservative
See Athabasca-Sturgeon-Redwater 2012-present

The electoral district was created in the 2004 boundary redistribution. The election held that year saw incumbent Progressive Conservative Cabinet Minister Mike Cardinal who previously represented the Athabasca-Wabasca electoral district win here. He defeated five other candidates with just under half the popular vote to pick up the new district for his party.

Cardinal kept his spot in cabinet and was shuffled to the Human Resources and Employment portfolio by Premier Ralph Klein. He was shuffled to the backbenches in 2006 and retired from the legislature at dissolution 2008.

The second representative of the district was Progressive Conservative MLA Jeff Johnson. He was elected for the first time in 2008 with a landslide majority.

== Legislative election results ==
=== 2004 ===
2004 Alberta general election
Party	Candidate	Votes	%	±%
Progressive Conservative	Mike Cardinal	5,707	47.68%	–
Liberal	Nicole Belland	3,253	27.18%	–
New Democratic	Peter Opryshko	1,397	11.67%	–
Alberta Alliance	Sean Whelan	1,184	9.89%	–
Greens	Luke De Smet	252	2.11%	–
Social Credit	Leonard Fish	177	1.48%	–
Total		11,970	–	–
Rejected, spoiled and declined		53	–	–
Eligible electors / turnout		24,074	49.94%	–
Progressive Conservative pickup new district.				
Source(s) Source: "Elections Alberta 2004 General Election". Elections Alberta.

=== 2008 ===
2008 Alberta general election
Party	Candidate	Votes	%	±%
Progressive Conservative	Jeff Johnson	7,484	67.99%	20.31%
Liberal	Bill Bonko Jr.	1,379	12.53%	-14.65%
New Democratic	Peter Opryshko	1,225	11.13%	-0.54%
Wildrose Alliance	Mike Radojcic	517	4.70%	–
Green	Phyllis Penchuk	403	3.66%	1.55%
Total		11,008	–	–
Rejected, spoiled and declined		15	–	–
Eligible electors / turnout		24,394	45.19%	–
Progressive Conservative hold		Swing		17.48%
Source(s) Source: "Elections Alberta 2008 General Election". Elections Alberta.

== Senate nominee election results ==
=== 2004 ===
2004 Senate nominee election results: Athabasca-Redwater				Turnout 50.02%	
Affiliation	Candidate	Votes	% votes	% ballots	Rank
Progressive Conservative	Betty Unger	4,603	14.53%	45.84%	2
Progressive Conservative	Bert Brown	4,112	12.98%	40.95%	1
Progressive Conservative	Cliff Breitkreuz	3,813	12.04%	37.97%	3
Independent	Link Byfield	3,405	10.75%	33.91%	4
Alberta Alliance	Michael Roth	3,017	9.52%	30.05%	7
Alberta Alliance	Gary Horan	2,823	8.91%	28.12%	10
Alberta Alliance	Vance Gough	2,800	8.84%	27.89%	8
Progressive Conservative	Jim Silye	2,466	7.78%	24.56%	5
Progressive Conservative	David Usherwood	2,450	7.73%	24.40%	6
Independent	Tom Sindlinger	2,193	6.92%	21.84%	9
Total votes		31,682	100%		
Total ballots		10,041	3.16 votes per ballot		
Rejected, spoiled and declined		962			

Voters had the option of selecting four candidates on the ballot.

== Student vote results ==
=== 2004 ===
Participating schools
Guthrie School
H.A. Kostash School
Lilian Schick school
Namao school
Newbrook School
Sturgeon Composite High School
Thorhild Central School

On November 19, 2004, a student vote was conducted at participating Alberta schools to parallel the 2004 Alberta general election results. The vote was designed to educate students and simulate the electoral process for persons who had not yet reached the legal majority. The vote was conducted in 80 of the 83 provincial electoral districts, with students voting for actual election candidates. Schools with a large student body who resided in another electoral district had the option to vote for candidates outside of the electoral district than where they were physically located.

2004 Alberta student vote results
Affiliation	Candidate	Votes	%
Progressive Conservative	Mike Cardinal	337	36.39%
Green	Luke de Smet	185	19.98%
Liberal	Nicole Belland	173	18.68%
New Democratic	Peter Opryshko	110	11.88%
Alberta Alliance	Sean Whelan	69	7.45%
Social Credit	Leonard Fish	52	5.62%
Total		926	100%
Rejected, spoiled and declined		42	

== See also ==
- List of Alberta provincial electoral districts
- Canadian provincial electoral districts
