= Mike Cardinal =

Canadian politician (1941–2023)

The Honourable Mike Cardinal ECA

Member of the Legislative Assembly of Alberta for Athabasca-Redwater Athabasca-Wabasca (1993-2004) Athabasca-Lac La Biche (1989-1993)
- In office March 20, 1989 – March 3, 2008
- Preceded by: Leo Piquette
- Succeeded by: Jeff Johnson

Personal details
- Born: Melvin Percy Joseph Cardinal; July 17, 1941 Slave Lake, Alberta
- Died: January 12, 2023 (aged 81) Edmonton, Alberta
- Party: Progressive Conservative
- Portfolio: Minister of Family and Social Services (1992–1996); Associate Minister of Forestry (1999–2000); Minister of Resource Development (2000–2001); Minister of Sustainable Resource Development (2001–2004); Minister of Human Resources and Employment (2004–2006)

Melvin Percy Joseph Cardinal ECA (July 17, 1941 – January 12, 2023) was a Canadian politician from Alberta. He served as a member of the Legislative Assembly of Alberta from 1989 until 2008 as a Progressive Conservative representing the electoral districts of Athabasca-Lac La Biche, Athabasca-Wabasca, and Athabasca-Redwater. Cardinal was the first status Indian to hold a position in Executive Council in Alberta, serving in the cabinet of Premier Ralph Klein as the Minister of Family and Social Services (1992−1996), Minister of Sustainable Resource Development (2000−2004), and Minister of Human Resources and Employment (2004–2006).

== Early life ==
Cardinal was born into a family of 13 on July 17, 1941 in Slave Lake, Alberta, the son of a trapper and a homemaker. He dropped out of school in grade 8 to work, but eventually returned to school and graduated from grade 12. He spent ten years in the forestry and sawmill industries before entering the public sector. He worked as a mortgage officer with the Alberta Housing Corporation before transferring to the Alberta Human Resources Development Authority. There he developed a Native housing/relocation program before moving to the Department of Advanced Education and Manpower, where he served as regional supervisor of Employment/Counselling Services for ten years. He served a further three years as a regional manager of Employment and Relocation Counselling Services, and three more as a senior consultant to the Assistant Deputy Minister of Advanced Education and Manpower.

== Political career ==
Cardinal served as a town councillor in Slave Lake and on the school board of the Northland School Division No. 61, where he chaired the board for three of his six years of service.

=== Provincial electoral record ===
Cardinal first sought provincial office in the 1989 election, when he ran as a Progressive Conservative against incumbent New Democrat Leo Piquette in the riding of Athabasca-Lac La Biche. He defeated Piquette by nearly 900 votes.

When electoral boundaries were re-drawn in advance of the 1993 election, Cardinal ran in the new riding of Athabasca-Wabasca. He was elected here not only in 1993, but also in 1997 and 2001, taking well over fifty percent of the vote each time. The 2001 election included New Democratic candidate Colin Piquette, the son of Leo Piquette who Cardinal defeated in the 1989 election.

In 2004 this riding too was abolished, and Cardinal served his last term as the member for Athabasca-Redwater, which he won handily in the 2004 election. He did not seek re-election at the conclusion of this term.

=== Backbencher ===
Cardinal served as a backbencher from the time of his election until Ralph Klein became premier in December 1992. During this time, he sponsored the Metis Settlements Land Protection Act of 1990, a government bill designed to give Metis settlements ownership over the land. It passed without significant controversy, though Liberal Nicholas Taylor questioned a portion of the bill that stipulated that the land, as it was communally owned, could not be mortgaged.

=== Minister of Family and Social Services (1992−1996) ===
In 1992, Don Getty announced his retirement as Premier of Alberta sparking a leadership contest. In the December 1992 leadership election, Ralph Klein was selected by party members as the new leader and Premier of Alberta. In the week following his selection, Klein announced his new Cabinet which included Cardinal as the Minister of Family and Social Services. He was the first treaty Indian to be named to Alberta's cabinet, and, in addition to his portfolio, was given cabinet responsibility for aboriginal issues.

Cardinal was made a number of strides as Minister to help meet the Klein government's austerity goals. By mid-1995, Cardinal had cut $300 million in department expenses by reducing welfare rolls and introducing self-help and work programs for welfare recipients. Cardinal's policy changes included reducing the monthly allowance for single and able bodied welfare recipients, resulting in 25,000 people or 28 per cent of welfare rolls, being removed from the system, saving $150 million in government expenses.

Cardinal was embroiled in several controversies as a Minister. In 1994, while pursuing policy to withhold car registration from parents who failed to pay child support, it came to light that Cardinal had left the mother of his child in 1972 two months before the child was born, had never acknowledged the child or paid child support. The opposition Liberals were critical of Cardinal, accusing him of hypocrisy and demanded that he resign from Cabinet. Premier Klein continued to support Cardinal as a Minister, arguing he was meeting his obligations and agreement with his daughter and the mother. Cardinal also issued an order preventing provincial social services employees from publicly speaking out against provincial policy, and made public threats to fire employees who broke the order. In 1996, pilots for the Government of Alberta charter aircraft reported to the Premier that Cardinal had ordered flight plan deviations to pick up an unauthorized female passenger. While Klein was supportive of Cardinal through the child support scandal, he was unable to ignore the misuse of government property issues, and Klein requesting Cardinal resign from Cabinet which occurred on May 31, 1996. Klein appointed Stockwell Day to replace Cardinal as Minister.

=== Minister of Resource Development and Sustainable Resource Development (2000−2004) ===
Cardinal returned to Ralph Klein's cabinet in June 2000 when he was appointed Minister of Resource Development. As Minister of Resource Development, Cardinal led the deregulation efforts for the Alberta electricity system. Alberta's rapidly growing economy put a significant strain on the province's electricity system, resulting in significantly higher than anticipated costs for residential consumers as deregulation came into effect in 2000. Cardinal was able to responded to gasoline and natural gas challenges by providing two $150 rebate cheques, but the government held firm that electricity rates would eventually come down through deregulation. In September 2000, a $20 monthly rebate was provided on monthly bills, totaling $1.1 billion, which was not received well by the public. The government initially announced that residential increases would be stopped in 2001, but after backlash from power companies in December 2000, the government lifted the rate caps and doubled the electricity rebate to $40 per month, doubling the province's rebate program expense to over $2 billion. The government's response to deregulation in 2000, a year before the provincial election, was described as "throwing money" as the problem in hopes it would be resolved, and making policy "on the fly".

In 2001, the Ministry of Resource Development was split, with oil and gas regulation moving to the Ministry of Energy under Murray D. Smith, and the environmental and land management elements remaining with Cardinal in the newly named Ministry of Sustainable Resource Development. In 2002, Cardinal was found to have violated the Conflict of Interests Act when he approved opening Calling Lake for recreational fishing after it was discovered he owned a home along the lake. Cardinal made the decision to open the lake despite advice from departmental biologists that deemed the lake ecosystem to be "collapsed".

== Personal life and death ==
Cardinal died on January 12, 2023, at the age of 81.

== Election results ==
1989 Alberta general election: Athabasca-Lac La Biche
Party	Candidate	Votes	%	±%
Progressive Conservative	Mike Cardinal	4,237	45.22%	9.18%
New Democratic	Leo Piquette	3,342	35.67%	-3.56%
Liberal	Tom Maccagno	1,791	19.11%	-3.48%
Total		9,370	–	–
Rejected, spoiled and declined		30	–	–
Eligible electors / turnout		13,933	67.47%	–
Progressive Conservative gain from New Democratic		Swing		3.18%
Source(s) Source: "Athabasca-Lac La Biche Official Results 1989 Alberta general election". Alberta Heritage Community Foundation.

1993 Alberta general election: Athabasca-Wabasca
Party	Candidate	Votes	%	±%
Progressive Conservative	Mike Cardinal	4,144	59.99%	–
Liberal	Simon Waquan	1,921	27.81%	–
New Democratic	Emil Zachkewich	843	12.20%	–
Total		6,908	–	–
Rejected, spoiled and declined		31	–	–
Eligible electors / turnout		11,165	62.15%	–
Progressive Conservative pickup new district.				
Source(s) Source: "Athabasca-Wabasca Official Results 1993 Alberta general election". Alberta Heritage Community Foundation.

1997 Alberta general election: Athabasca-Wabasca
Party	Candidate	Votes	%	±%
Progressive Conservative	Mike Cardinal	3,380	59.00%	-0.99%
Liberal	Tony Mercredi	1,481	25.85%	-1.96%
Social Credit	Curtis Gunderson	468	8.17%	–
New Democratic	Dean Patriquin	300	5.24%	-6.97%
Greens	Harlan Light	100	1.75%	–
Total		5,729	–	–
Rejected, spoiled and declined		34	–	–
Eligible electors / turnout		12,009	47.99%	–
Progressive Conservative hold		Swing		0.48%
Source(s) Source: "Athabasca-Wabasca Official Results 1997 Alberta general election". Alberta Heritage Community Foundation.

2001 Alberta general election: Athabasca-Wabasca
Party	Candidate	Votes	%	±%
Progressive Conservative	Mike Cardinal	4,238	66.69%	7.69%
Liberal	Al Wurfel	1,264	19.89%	-5.96%
New Democratic	Colin Piquette	606	9.54%	4.30%
Social Credit	David Klassen	153	2.41%	-5.76%
Greens	Ian Hopfe	94	1.48%	-0.27%
Total		6,355	–	–
Rejected, spoiled and declined		6	–	–
Eligible electors / turnout		12,622	50.40%	–
Progressive Conservative hold		Swing		6.83%
Source(s) Source: "Athabasca-Wabasca Official Results 2001 Alberta general election". Alberta Heritage Community Foundation.

2004 Alberta general election: Athabasca-Redwater
Party	Candidate	Votes	%	±%
Progressive Conservative	Mike Cardinal	5,707	47.68%	–
Liberal	Nicole Belland	3,253	27.18%	–
New Democratic	Peter Opryshko	1,397	11.67%	–
Alberta Alliance	Sean Whelan	1,184	9.89%	–
Greens	Luke De Smet	252	2.11%	–
Social Credit	Leonard Fish	177	1.48%	–
Total		11,970	–	–
Rejected, spoiled and declined		53	–	–
Eligible electors / turnout		24,074	49.94%	–
Progressive Conservative pickup new district.				
Source(s) Source: "Elections Alberta 2004 General Election". Elections Alberta.

Alberta provincial government of Ralph Klein
Cabinet posts (5)
Predecessor	Office	Successor
Clint Dunford	Minister of Human Resources and Employment; 2004–2006	Iris Evans (as Minister of Employment, Immigration and Industry)
New portfolio	Minister of Sustainable Resource Development; 2001–2004	David Coutts
Steve West	Minister of Resource Development; 2000–2001	Murray Smith (as Minister of Energy)
New portfolio	Associate Minister of Forestry; 1999–2000	Portfolio abolished
John Oldring	Minister of Family and Social Services; 1992–1996	Stockwell Day
