= Léo Piquette =

Canadian politician

Member of the Legislative Assembly of Alberta for Athabasca-Lac La Biche
- In office 1986–1989
- Preceded by: district created
- Succeeded by: Mike Cardinal

Personal details
- Born: May 22, 1946 (age 80) Plamondon, Alberta
- Party: Alberta New Democratic Party
- Children: Colin Piquette, two others

Léo Piquette (born May 22, 1946) is a retired Canadian politician in the province of Alberta. A member of the Alberta New Democratic Party, he was the member of the Legislative Assembly of Alberta (MLA) for the district of Athabasca-Lac La Biche from 1986 to 1989.

Piquette is largely remembered for what would come to be known as the "Piquette Affair." On April 7, 1987, Piquette attempted to ask a question in French in the Legislative Assembly of Alberta. Speaker David J. Carter twice prevented him from asking the question, ruling that English was the only language permitted in the legislature. Piquette appeared before a special hearing of the legislature's Election and Privilege Committee to argue the legislature had a duty to let members speak both English and French. He relied on section 110 of the Northwest Territories Act, which provided that members of the Northwest Territories legislature could use both English and French in debates. Piquette reasoned that the Act (which governed the territory that contained Alberta before Alberta became a province in 1905) had never been repealed, and was still in effect.

The incident sparked two rallies at the legislature in April and December 1987, where hundreds of francophones from across Alberta demonstrated in support of francophone language rights. In February 1988, the Supreme Court of Canada released its decision in R. v. Mercure, [1988] 1 S.C.R. 234. The Court ruled that s. 110 continued in force in both Saskatchewan and Alberta but also held that the legislatures of those provinces could unilaterally modify these language rights. The Alberta Legislature responded by passing the Languages Act in 1988, which states that Members of the Legislative Assembly may use either English or French in the Assembly.

After his electoral defeat in 1989, Léo Piquette stayed active in the francophone community and provincial politics. In 1994, he helped pioneer francophone education in Alberta after the Alberta government recognised the constitutional right of francophone parents to publicly funded francophone schools. He became a school board member of the Conseil Scolaire Centre-Est in 1994 and was Chair of the Board until 2004 when he was elected as President of the Fédération des Conseils Scolaires de l'Alberta. He was also a founding member and President of the Chambre Économique de l'Alberta. He is currently the Alberta Director for RRDEE Canada, a group of businesspeople who work with the federal government to implement bilingualism policies throughout Canada.

His son Colin Piquette served as NDP MLA from 2015 to 2019.
