= Klein ministry =

Cabinet of Alberta, 1992–2006

Klein Ministry
- 12th ministry of Alberta

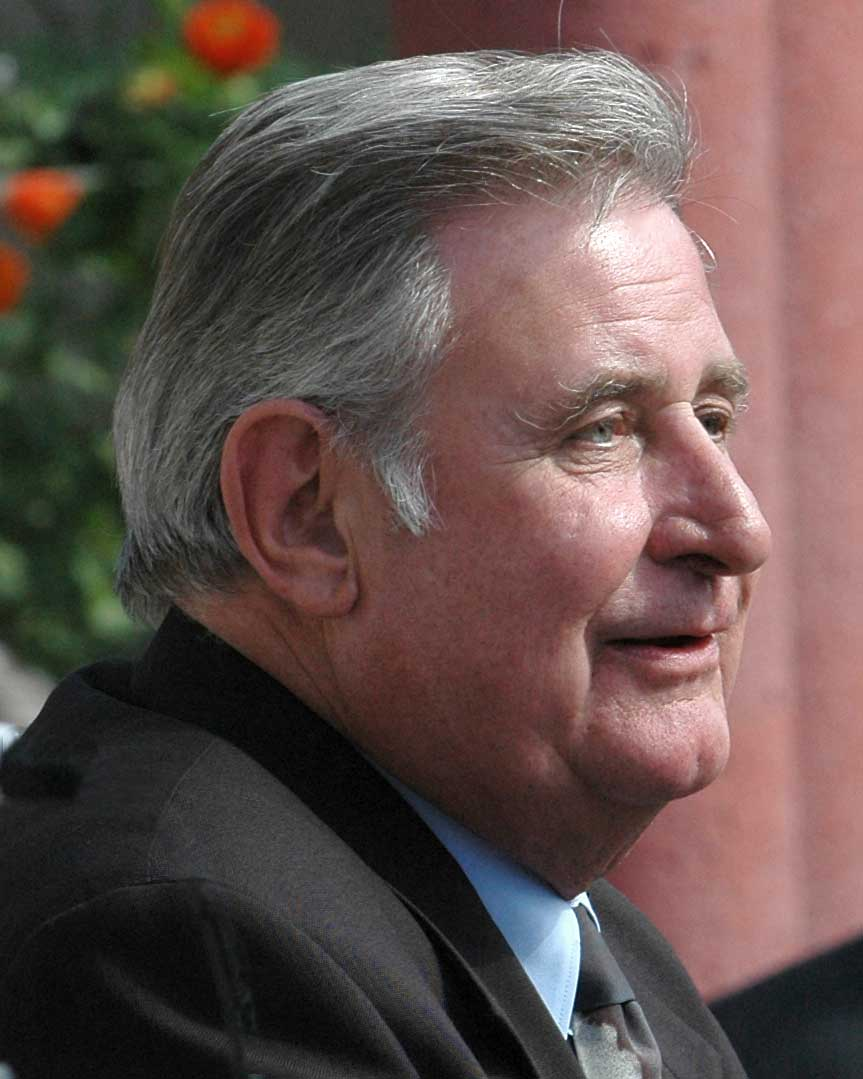
- Date formed: December 14, 1992
- Date dissolved: December 14, 2006

People and organisations
- Monarch: Elizabeth II
- Lieutenant Governor: Gordon Towers; Horace Andrew Olson; Lois Hole; Norman Kwong
- Premier: Ralph Klein
- Member party: Progressive Conservative
- Status in legislature: Majority

History
- Legislature terms: 22nd Alberta Legislature; 23rd Alberta Legislature; 24th Alberta Legislature; 25th Alberta Legislature; 26th Alberta Legislature
- Predecessor: Getty Ministry
- Successor: Stelmach Ministry

The Klein Ministry was the combined Cabinet (called Executive Council of Alberta), chaired by Premier Ralph Klein, and Ministers that governed Alberta from the mid-point of the 22nd Alberta Legislature from December 14, 1992, to the mid-point of the 26th Alberta Legislature until December 14, 2006.

The Executive Council (commonly known as the cabinet) was made up of members of the Progressive Conservative Party of Alberta which held a majority of seats in the Legislative Assembly of Alberta. The cabinet was appointed by the Lieutenant Governor of Alberta on the advice of the Premier. Members of the council are styled "the Honourable" only for the duration of their membership, not for life.

Klien's last cabinet was sworn in on November 24, 2004, following the 26th Alberta general election. There was a cabinet shuffle on April 6, 2006, to fill vacancies caused by Lyle Oberg's dismissal and Ed Stelmach's resignation.

Members of the final Klein cabinet are listed in order of precedence.

== Klein cabinet ==
| Name | Ministry | Date Appointed | Date Departed |
|---|---|---|---|
| Ralph Klein | President of the Executive Council (Premier) | December 14, 1992 | December 14, 2006 |
| Peter Elzinga | Deputy Premier | December 15, 1992 | June 29, 1993 |
| Ken Kowalski | Deputy Premier | December 15, 1992 | October 21, 1994 |
| Shirley McClellan | Deputy Premier | March 19, 2001 | December 14, 2006 |
| Pearl Calahasen | Minister of Aboriginal Affairs and Northern Development | March 19, 2001 | December 14, 2006 |
| Dave Hancock | Minister of Advanced Education | November 25, 2004 | April 5, 2006 |
| Denis Herard | Minister of Advanced Education | April 6, 2006 | December 14, 2006 |
| Jack Ady | Minister of Advanced Education and Career Development | December 15, 1992 | March 25, 1997 |
| Clint Dunford | Minister of Advanced Education and Career Development | March 26, 1997 | May 25, 1999 |
| Ernie Isley | Minister of Agriculture and Rural Development Minister of Agriculture, Food and Rural Development | December 15, 1992 | June 29, 1993 |
| Walter Paszkowski | Minister of Agriculture, Food and Rural Development | June 30, 1993 | March 25, 1997 |
| Ed Stelmach | Minister of Agriculture, Food and Rural Development | March 26, 1997 | May 25, 1999 |
| Ty Lund | Minister of Agriculture, Food and Rural Development | May 26, 1999 | March 18, 2001 |
| Shirley McClellan | Minister of Agriculture, Food and Rural Development | March 19, 2001 | November 25, 2004 |
| Doug Horner | Minister of Agriculture, Food and Rural Development | November 26, 2004 | December 14, 2006 |
| Iris Evans | Minister of Children's Services | May 26, 1999 | November 24, 2004 |
| Heather Forsyth | Minister of Children's Services | November 25, 2004 | December 14, 2006 |
| Dianne Mirosh | Minister of Community Development | December 15, 1992 | June 29, 1993 |
| Gary Mar | Minister of Community Development | June 30, 1993 | May 30, 1996 |
| Shirley McClellan | Minister of Community Development | May 31, 1996 | May 25, 1999 |
| Stan Woloshyn | Minister of Community Development | May 26, 1999 | March 18, 2001 |
| Gene Zwozdesky | Minister of Community Development | March 19, 2001 | November 24, 2004 |
| Gary Mar | Minister of Community Development | November 25, 2004 | April 5, 2006 |
| Denis Ducharme | Minister of Community Development | April 6, 2006 | December 15, 2006 |
| Pat Nelson | Minister of Economic Development | August 12, 1997 | May 25, 1999 |
| Jon Havelock | Minister of Economic Development | May 26, 1999 | March 18, 2001 |
| Mark Norris | Minister of Economic Development | March 19, 2001 | November 24, 2004 |
| Clint Dunford | Minister of Economic Development | November 25, 2004 | December 14, 2006 |
| Donald H. Sparrow | Minister of Economic Development and Tourism | December 15, 1992 | June 29, 1993 |
| Ken Kowalski | Minister of Economic Development and Tourism | June 30, 1993 | October 20, 1994 |
| Ralph Klein | Minister of Economic Development and Tourism | October 21, 1994 | May 31, 1995 |
| Murray Smith | Minister of Economic Development and Tourism | June 1, 1995 | May 30, 1996 |
| Steve West | Minister of Economic Development and Tourism | May 31, 1996 | March 25, 1997 |
| Pat Nelson | Minister of Economic Development and Tourism | March 26, 1997 | August 11, 1997 |
| Halvar Jonson | Minister of Education | December 15, 1992 | May 30, 1996 |
| Gary Mar | Minister of Education | May 31, 1996 | May 25, 1999 |
| Gene Zwozdesky | Minister of Education | November 25, 2004 | December 14, 2006 |
| Pat Nelson | Minister of Energy | December 15, 1992 | March 25, 1997 |
| Steve West | Minister of Energy | March 26, 1997 | May 25, 1999 |
| Murray Smith | Minister of Energy | March 19, 2001 | November 24, 2004 |
| Greg Melchin | Minister of Energy | November 25, 2004 | December 14, 2006 |
| Brian Evans | Minister of Environmental Protection | December 15, 1992 | October 20, 1994 |
| Ty Lund | Minister of Environmental Protection | October 21, 1994 | May 25, 1999 |
| Mike Cardinal | Minister of Family and Social Services | December 15, 1992 | May 30, 1996 |
| Stockwell Day | Minister of Family and Social Services | May 31, 1996 | March 25, 1997 |
| Lyle Oberg | Minister of Family and Social Services | March 26, 1997 | May 25, 1999 |
| Peter Elzinga | Minister of Federal and Intergovernmental Affairs | December 15, 1992 | June 29, 1993 |
| Ralph Klein | Minister of Federal and Intergovernmental Affairs | June 30, 1993 | October 20, 1994 |
| Ken Rostad | Minister of Federal and Intergovernmental Affairs | October 21, 1994 | March 25, 1997 |
| Dave Hancock | Minister of Federal and Intergovernmental Affairs | March 26, 1997 | November 4, 1997 |
| Pat Nelson | Minister of Finance | March 19, 2001 | November 24, 2004 |
| Shirley McClellan | Minister of Finance | November 25, 2004 | December 14, 2006 |
| Murray Smith | Minister of Finance | May 26, 1999 | March 18, 2001 |
| Ron Stevens | Minister of Gaming | March 19, 2001 | November 24, 2004 |
| Gordon Graydon | Minister of Gaming | November 25, 2004 | December 14, 2006 |
| Pat Nelson | Minister of Government Services | May 26, 1999 | March 18, 2001 |
| David Coutts | Minister of Government Services | March 19, 2001 | November 24, 2004 |
| Ty Lund | Minister of Government Services | November 25, 2004 | April 5, 2006 |
| George VanderBurg | Minister of Government Services | April 6, 2006 | December 14, 2006 |
| Shirley McClellan | Minister of Health | December 15, 1992 | May 30, 1996 |
| Halvar Jonson | Minister of Health Minister of Health and Wellness | May 31, 1996 | June 6, 2000 |
| Gary Mar | Minister of Health and Wellness | June 7, 2000 | November 24, 2004 |
| Iris Evans | Minister of Health and Wellness | November 25, 2004 | December 14, 2006 |
| Clint Dunford | Minister of Human Resources and Employment | May 26, 1999 | November 24, 2004 |
| Mike Cardinal | Minister of Human Resources and Employment | November 25, 2004 | December 14, 2006 |
| Ed Stelmach | Minister of Infrastructure | May 26, 1999 | March 18, 2001 |
| Ty Lund | Minister of Infrastructure | March 19, 2001 | November 24, 2004 |
| Lyle Oberg | Minister of Infrastructure and Transportation | November 25, 2004 | March 23, 2006 |
| Ty Lund | Minister of Infrastructure and Transportation | April 6, 2006 | December 14, 2006 |
| Lorne Taylor | Minister of Innovation and Science | May 26, 1999 | March 18, 2001 |
| Victor Doerksen | Minister of Innovation and Science | March 19, 2001 | August 15, 2006 |
| Dave Hancock | Minister of Intergovernmental and Aboriginal Affairs | November 5, 1997 | May 25, 1999 |
| Shirley McClellan | Minister of International and Intergovernmental Relations | May 26, 1999 | March 18, 2001 |
| Halvar Jonson | Minister of International and Intergovernmental Relations | March 19, 2001 | November 24, 2004 |
| Ed Stelmach | Minister of International and Intergovernmental Relations | November 25, 2004 | March 21, 2006 |
| Gary Mar | Minister of International and Intergovernmental Relations | April 6, 2006 | December 14, 2006 |
| Dick Fowler | Minister of Justice and Attorney General | December 15, 1992 | June 29, 1993 |
| Ken Rostad | Minister of Justice and Attorney General | June 30, 1993 | October 20, 1994 |
| Brian Evans | Minister of Justice and Attorney General | October 21, 1994 | March 25, 1997 |
| Jon Havelock | Minister of Justice and Attorney General | March 26, 1997 | May 25, 1999 |
| Dave Hancock | Minister of Justice and Attorney General | May 26, 1999 | November 24, 2004 |
| Ron Stevens | Minister of Justice and Attorney General | November 25, 2004 | March 12, 2008 |
| Stockwell Day | Minister of Labour | December 15, 1992 | May 30, 1996 |
| Murray Smith | Minister of Labour | June 10, 1996 | May 25, 1999 |
| Lyle Oberg | Minister of Learning | May 26, 1999 | November 24, 2004 |
| Steve West | Minister of Municipal Affairs | December 15, 1992 | December 20, 1994 |
| Tom Thurber | Minister of Municipal Affairs | December 21, 1994 | March 25, 1997 |
| Iris Evans | Minister of Municipal Affairs | March 26, 1997 | May 25, 1999 |
| Walter Paszkowski | Minister of Municipal Affairs | May 26, 1999 | March 18, 2001 |
| Guy Boutilier | Minister of Municipal Affairs | March 19, 2001 | November 24, 2004 |
| Rob Renner | Minister of Municipal Affairs | November 25, 2004 | December 14, 2006 |
| Tom Thurber | Minister of Public Works, Supply and Services | June 30, 1993 | December 20, 1994 |
| Robert Fischer | Minister of Public Works, Supply and Services | December 21, 1994 | May 30, 1996 |
| Stan Woloshyn | Minister of Public Works, Supply and Services | May 31, 1996 | May 25, 1999 |
| Steve West | Minister of Resource Development | May 26, 1999 | June 6, 2000 |
| Mike Cardinal | Minister of Resource Development | June 7, 2000 | March 18, 2001 |
| Luke Ouellette | Minister of Restructuring and Government Efficiency | November 25, 2004 | December 14, 2006 |
| Greg Melchin | Minister of Revenue | March 19, 2001 | November 24, 2004 |
| Stan Woloshyn | Minister of Seniors | March 19, 2001 | November 24, 2004 |
| Yvonne Fritz | Minister of Seniors and Community Supports | November 25, 2004 | December 14, 2006 |
| Mike Cardinal | Minister of Sustainable Resource Development | March 19, 2001 | November 24, 2004 |
| David Coutts | Minister of Sustainable Resource Development | November 25, 2004 | December 14, 2006 |
| Gary Mar | Minister of the Environment | May 26, 1999 | June 6, 2000 |
| Halvar Jonson | Minister of the Environment | June 7, 2000 | March 18, 2001 |
| Lorne Taylor | Minister of the Environment | March 19, 2001 | November 24, 2004 |
| Guy Boutilier | Minister of the Environment | November 25, 2004 | December 14, 2006 |
| Ed Stelmach | Minister of Transportation | March 19, 2001 | November 24, 2004 |
| Peter Trynchy | Minister of Transportation and Utilities | December 15, 1992 | December 15, 1994 |
| Steve West | Minister of Transportation and Utilities | December 21, 1994 | May 30, 1996 |
| Robert Fischer | Minister of Transportation and Utilities | May 31, 1996 | March 25, 1997 |
| Walter Paszkowski | Minister of Transportation and Utilities | March 26, 1997 | May 25, 1999 |
| Dianne Mirosh | Minister Responsible for Science and Research | September 21, 1994 | March 25, 1997 |
| Lorne Taylor | Minister Responsible for Science, Research and Information Technology | March 26, 1997 | May 25, 1999 |
| Jim Dinning | Provincial Treasurer | December 15, 1992 | March 25, 1997 |
| Stockwell Day | Provincial Treasurer | March 26, 1997 | June 1, 2000 |
| Steve West | Provincial Treasurer | June 7, 2000 | March 18, 2001 |
| Heather Forsyth | Solicitor General | March 19, 2001 | November 24, 2004 |
| Harvey Cenaiko | Solicitor General Solicitor General and Minister of Public Security | November 25, 2004 | December 14, 2006 |
| Dianne Mirosh | Minister Without Portfolio | June 30, 1993 | September 20, 1994 |
| Murray Smith | Minister Without Portfolio | December 21, 1994 | May 31, 1995 |
| Pearl Calahasen | Minister Without Portfolio | May 31, 1996 | May 25, 1999 |
| Pearl Calahasen | Associate Minister of Aboriginal Affairs | May 26, 1999 | March 18, 2001 |
| Mike Cardinal | Associate Minister of Forestry | May 26, 1999 | June 6, 2000 |
| Gene Zwozdesky | Associate Minister of Health and Wellness | May 26, 1999 | March 18, 2001 |
| Barry McFarland | Associate Minister of Infrastructure and Transportation | April 6, 2006 | December 14, 2006 |

== See also ==
- Executive Council of Alberta
- List of Alberta provincial ministers
