= Alberta Legislature =

Legislature of Alberta, Canada

- 31st Alberta Legislature

Type
- Type: Unicameral
- Houses: Legislative Assembly
- Sovereign: The lieutenant governor (representing the King of Canada)

History
- Founded: 1905
- Preceded by: North-West Territories Legislature

Meeting place
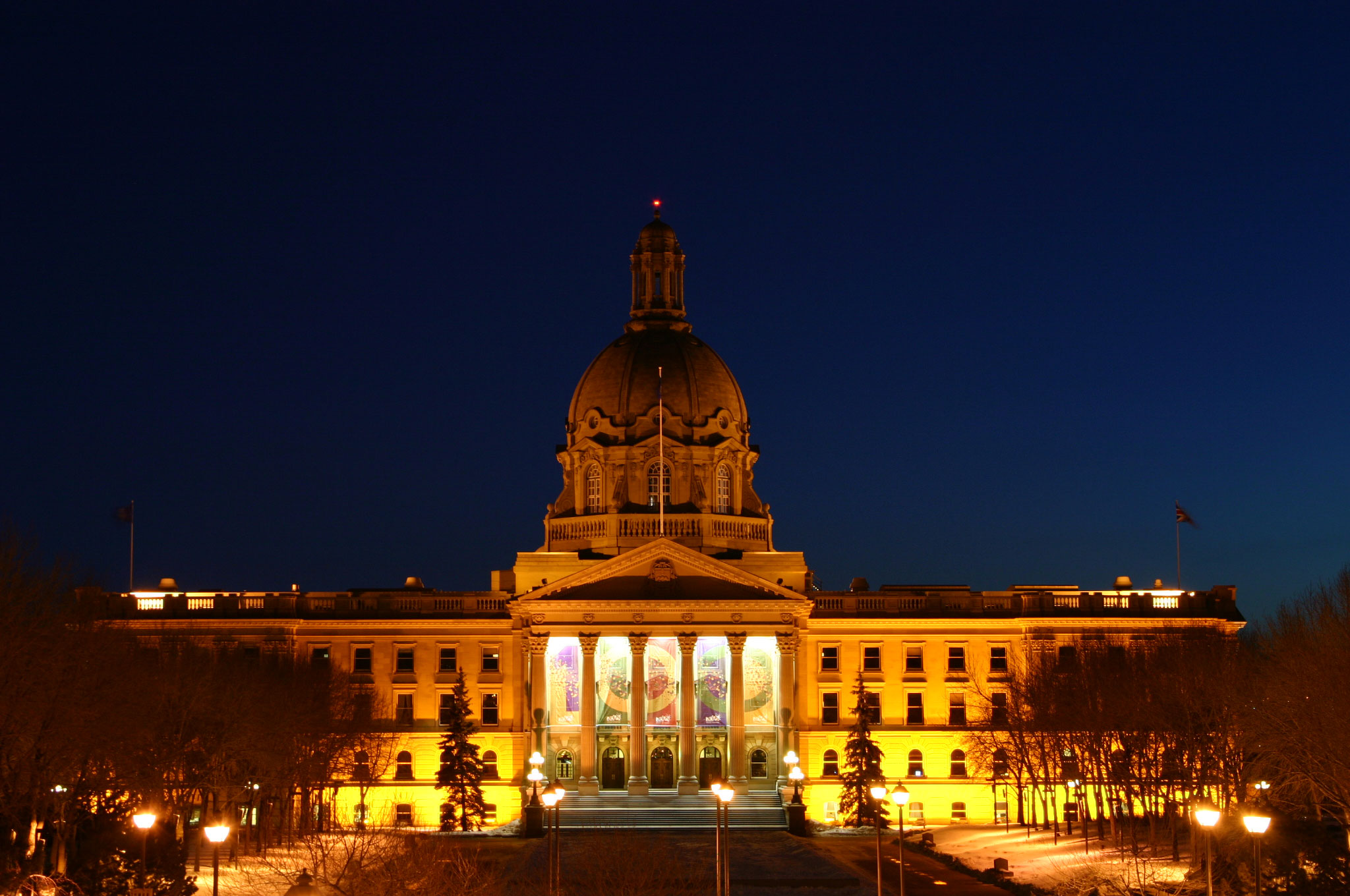
- Alberta Legislature Building, Edmonton, Alberta, Canada

The Alberta Legislature is the unicameral legislature of the province of Alberta, Canada. The legislature is made of two elements: the lieutenant governor (representing the King of Canada), and the Legislative Assembly of Alberta. The legislature has existed since Alberta was formed out of part of the North-West Territories in 1905.

Like the Canadian federal government, Alberta uses a Westminster-style parliamentary government, in which members are sent to the Legislative Assembly after general elections and the lieutenant governor appoints the person who can command a majority of the members of the Assembly, typically the leader of the party with the most seats, as Premier of Alberta. The premier then recommends the appointment of the Executive Council of Alberta. The premier is Alberta's head of government, while the King of Canada is its head of state.

== List of legislatures ==
Following is a list of the times the legislature has been convened since 1905. For previous legislatures, see List of Northwest Territories Legislative Assemblies.

- 1st Alberta Legislature: 1905–1909
- 2nd Alberta Legislature: 1909–1913
- 3rd Alberta Legislature: 1913–1917
- 4th Alberta Legislature: 1917–1921
- 5th Alberta Legislature: 1921–1926
- 6th Alberta Legislature: 1926–1930
- 7th Alberta Legislature: 1930–1935
- 8th Alberta Legislature: 1935–1940
- 9th Alberta Legislature: 1940–1944
- 10th Alberta Legislature: 1944–1948
- 11th Alberta Legislature: 1948–1952
- 12th Alberta Legislature: 1952–1955
- 13th Alberta Legislature: 1955–1959
- 14th Alberta Legislature: 1959–1963
- 15th Alberta Legislature: 1963–1967
- 16th Alberta Legislature: 1967–1971
- 17th Alberta Legislature: 1971–1975
- 18th Alberta Legislature: 1975–1979
- 19th Alberta Legislature: 1979–1982
- 20th Alberta Legislature: 1982–1986
- 21st Alberta Legislature: 1986–1989
- 22nd Alberta Legislature: 1989–1993
- 23rd Alberta Legislature: 1993–1997
- 24th Alberta Legislature: 1997–2001
- 25th Alberta Legislature: 2001–2004
- 26th Alberta Legislature: 2004–2008
- 27th Alberta Legislature: 2008–2012
- 28th Alberta Legislature: 2012–2015
- 29th Alberta Legislature: 2015–2019
- 30th Alberta Legislature: 2019–2023
- 31st Alberta Legislature: 2023–present
