= Athabasca-Sturgeon-Redwater =

Defunct provincial electoral district in Alberta, Canada

Alberta electoral district
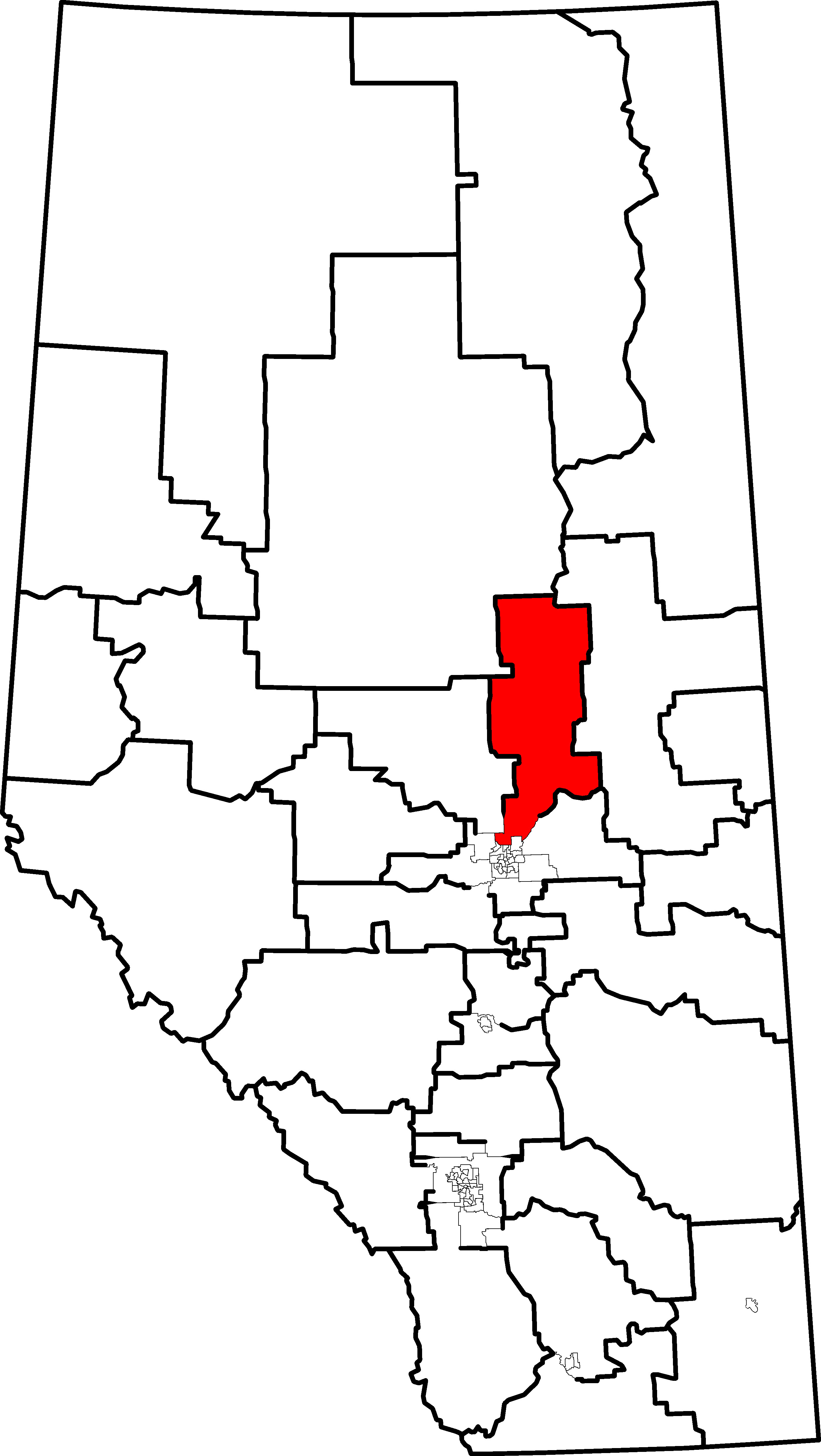
- 2010 boundaries

Defunct provincial electoral district
- Legislature: Legislative Assembly of Alberta
- District created: 2010
- District abolished: 2019
- First contested: 2012
- Last contested: 2015

Athabasca-Sturgeon-Redwater was a provincial electoral district in Alberta mandated to return a single member to the Legislative Assembly of Alberta using first-past-the-post balloting from 2012 to 2019.

== History ==
The electoral district was created in the 2010 electoral boundary re-distribution from the electoral old district of Athabasca-Redwater. The electoral district boundaries were updated to align the district to current municipal boundaries along the sparsely populated north and western boundaries.

The Athabasca-Sturgeon electoral district was dissolved in the 2017 electoral boundary re-distribution, and portions of the district were incorporated into the electoral districts of Athabasca-Barrhead-Westlock and Morinville-St. Albert for the 2019 Alberta general election.

=== Boundary history ===
48 Athabasca-Redwater 2010 boundaries
Bordering districts
North	East	West	South
Lesser Slave Lake	Lac La Biche-St. Paul-Two Hills	Barrhead-Morinville-Westlock, Lesser Slave Lake, Spruce Grove-St. Albert	Edmonton-Calder, Edmonton-Castle Downs, Edmonton-Decore, Edmonton-Manning, Fort Saskatchewan-Vegreville, St. Albert
Note: Boundary descriptions were not used in the 2010 redistribution.

=== Representation history ===
Members of the Legislative Assembly for Athabasca-Sturgeon-Redwater
Assembly	Years	Member	Party
See Athabasca-Redwater 2004–2012
28th	2012–2015	Jeff Johnson	PC
29th	2015–2019	Colin Piquette	NDP
See Athabasca-Barrhead-Westlock and Morinville-St. Albert 2019–

The predecessor district Athabasca-Redwater that existed from 2004 to 2012. Its antecedents had returned Progressive Conservative candidates since the 1970s while old Redwater returned Liberal candidates until 1997. The current incumbent is Progressive Conservative MLA Jeff Johnson who won his first term in office in the 2008 election with a landslide majority.

== Legislative election results ==
=== 2012 ===
2012 Alberta general election
Party	Candidate	Votes	%	±%
Progressive Conservative	Jeff Johnson	7,384	48.40%	–
Wildrose	Travis Olson	5,304	34.77%	–
New Democratic	Mandy Melnyk	2,091	13.71%	–
Liberal	Gino Akbari	476	3.12%	–
Total		15,255	–	–
Rejected, spoiled and declined		106	–	–
Eligible electors / turnout		25,658	59.87%	–
Progressive Conservative pickup new district.				
Source(s) Source: "Elections Alberta 2012 General Election". Elections Alberta.

=== 2015 ===
2015 Alberta general election
Party	Candidate	Votes	%	±%
New Democratic	Colin Piquette	6,797	40.49%	26.79%
Progressive Conservative	Jeff Johnson	5,016	29.88%	-18.52%
Wildrose	Travis Olson	4,973	29.63%	-5.14%
Total		16,786	–	–
Rejected, spoiled, and declined		50	–	–
Eligible electors / turnout		25,826	65.19%	–
New Democratic gain from Progressive Conservative		Swing		-1.51%
Source(s) Source: "Elections Alberta 2015 General Election". Elections Alberta.

== Student vote results ==
=== 2012 ===
2012 Alberta student vote results
Affiliation	Candidate	Votes	%
Progressive Conservative	Jeff Johnson		
Wildrose	Travis Olson		
Liberal	Gino Akbari		%
NDP	Mandy Melnyk		%
Total			100%

== See also ==
- List of Alberta provincial electoral districts
- Canadian provincial electoral districts
