= Athabasca-Lac La Biche =

Defunct provincial electoral district in Alberta, Canada

Alberta electoral district

Defunct provincial electoral district
- Legislature: Legislative Assembly of Alberta
- District created: 1986
- District abolished: 1993
- First contested: 1986
- Last contested: 1989

Athabasca-Lac La Biche was a provincial electoral district in Alberta, Canada, mandated to return a single member to the Legislative Assembly of Alberta using the first-past-the-post method of voting from 1986 to 1993.

== History ==
The Athabasca-Lac La Biche electoral district was established in the 1986 electoral boundary re-distribution from the Athabasca and Lac La Biche-McMurray electoral districts.

The electoral district was abolished in the 1993 electoral district re-distribution and succeeded by Lac La Biche-St. Paul and Athabasca-Wabasca electoral districts.

=== Representation history ===
Members of the Legislative Assembly for Athabasca-Lac La Biche
Assembly	Years	Member	Party
See Athabasca electoral district from 1905-1986 and Lac La Biche-McMurray electoral district from 1971-1986
21st	1986–1989	Leo Piquette	New Democratic
22nd	1989–1993	Mike Cardinal	Progressive Conservative
See Athabasca-Wabasca electoral district from 1993–2001 and Lac La Biche-St. Paul electoral district from 1993–2012

The short-lived Athabasca-Lac La Biche electoral district was contested only twice but returned two different members to the Legislature. Although the Progressive Conservatives had held the antecedent ridings since 1971 and 1975, New Democrat Leo Piquette picked up the new riding in 1986, one of only two rural districts won by the party in that election. In 1987 Piquette famously attempted to ask a question in the Legislature in French, sparking controversy over the place of the French language in Alberta.

In 1989, Piquette was defeated by PC candidate Mike Cardinal. He sponsored the Metis Settlements Land Protection Act in 1990 and was appointed to Ralph Klein's cabinet in 1992.

When the riding was abolished in 1993, Cardinal went on to run in the new district of Athabasca-Wabasca, and would serve four more terms in the Legislature. The other part of Athabasca-Lac La Biche went to the new riding of Lac La Biche-St. Paul, which the Liberals would win in the 1993 election.

== Election results ==
=== 1986 ===
1986 Alberta general election
Party	Candidate	Votes	%	±%
New Democratic	Leo Piquette	3,372	39.23%	–
Progressive Conservative	Bill Kostiw	3,098	36.04%	–
Liberal	Don J. Corse	1,942	22.59%	–
Western Canada Concept	Peter Mihailuk	184	2.14%	–
Total		8,596	–	–
Rejected, spoiled and declined		17	–	–
Eligible electors / turnout		13,941	61.78%	–
New Democratic pickup new district.				
Source(s) Source: "Athabasca-Lac La Biche Official Results 1986 Alberta general election". Alberta Heritage Community Foundation.

=== 1989 ===
1989 Alberta general election
Party	Candidate	Votes	%	±%
Progressive Conservative	Mike Cardinal	4,237	45.22%	9.18%
New Democratic	Leo Piquette	3,342	35.67%	-3.56%
Liberal	Tom Maccagno	1,791	19.11%	-3.48%
Total		9,370	–	–
Rejected, spoiled and declined		30	–	–
Eligible electors / turnout		13,933	67.47%	–
Progressive Conservative gain from New Democratic		Swing		3.18%
Source(s) Source: "Athabasca-Lac La Biche Official Results 1989 Alberta general election". Alberta Heritage Community Foundation.

== See also ==
- List of Alberta provincial electoral districts
- Canadian provincial electoral districts
