= Lac La Biche-St. Paul =

Defunct provincial electoral district in Alberta, Canada

Alberta electoral district
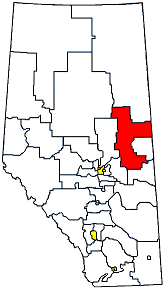
- 2004 boundaries

Defunct provincial electoral district
- Legislature: Legislative Assembly of Alberta
- District created: 1993
- District abolished: 2012
- First contested: 1993
- Last contested: 2008

Lac La Biche-St. Paul was a provincial electoral district in Alberta, Canada, mandated to return a single member to the Legislative Assembly of Alberta using first-past-the-post balloting from 1993 to 2012.

== Lac La Biche-St. Paul history ==
=== Boundary history ===
When created, the riding contained Lakeland County and the County of St. Paul No. 19 and all communities contained within, and was later expanded to include Two Hills. The Lac La Biche-St. Paul electoral district did not have any boundary changes throughout its history. The electoral district was dissolved in the 2010 electoral boundary re-distribution and replaced by the Lac La Biche-St. Paul-Two Hills prior to the 2012 Alberta general election.

60 Lac La Biche-St. Paul 2003 boundaries
Bordering districts
| North | East | West | South |
|---|---|---|---|
| Fort McMurray-Wood Buffalo | Bonnyville-Cold Lake | Athabasca-Redwater, Fort Saskatchewan-Vegreville, Lesser Slave Lake | Vermilion-Lloydminster |
| riding map goes here | | map in relation to other districts in Alberta goes here | |
Legal description from Electoral Divisions Act, S.A. 2003, c. E-4.1
Starting at the right bank of the Athabasca River and the north boundary of Twp. 80 Rge. 17 W4; then 1. east along the north boundary of Twp. 80 to the east boundary of Rge. 14 W4; 2. south along the east boundary of Rge. 14 to the north boundary of Sec. 18 in Twp. 80, Rge. 13 W4; 3. east along the north boundary of Secs. 18, 17, 16, 15, 14 and 13 to the east boundary of Rge. 13 W4; 4. north along the east boundary of Rge. 13 to the north boundary of Twp. 80; 5. east along the north boundary of Twp. 80 to the east boundary of Rge. 10 W4; 6. south along Rge. 10 W4 to the north boundary of Twp. 74; 7. east along the north boundary of Twp. 74 to the east boundary of Sec. 33 in the Twp.; 8. south along the east boundary of Secs. 33, 28, 21, 16, 9 and 4 in the Twp. and Secs. 33, 28 and 21 in Twp. 73, Rge. 9 W4 to the north boundary of the Cold Lake Air Weapons Range (CLAWR); 9. east along the north boundary of the CLAWR to the east boundary of the Province; 10. south along the east boundary of the Province to the south boundary of the CLAWR; 11. west along the south boundary of the CLAWR to the east boundary of Sec. 35 in Twp. 66, Rge. 9 W4; 12. south along the east boundary of Secs. 35, 26, 23, 14, 11 and 2 in the Twp. and the east boundary of Sec. 35 in Twp. 65 to the north boundary of Sec. 26 in Twp. 65, Rge. 9 W4; 13. west along the north boundary of Secs. 26, 27 and 28 in the Twp. to the east boundary of Sec. 29; 14. south along the east boundary of Secs. 29, 20, 17 and 8 to the north boundary of Sec. 5; 15. west along the north boundary of Secs. 5 and 6 in the Twp. and the north boundary of Secs. 1, 2 and 3 in Twp. 65, Rge. 10 W4 to the east boundary of Sec. 4; 16. south along the east boundary of Sec. 4 in the Twp. and Secs. 33, 28, 21, 16, 9 and 4 in Twp. 64 and Secs. 33, 28, 21, 16 and 9 in Twp. 63, Rge. 10 W4 to the intersection with the right bank of the Beaver River; 17. downstream along the right bank of the Beaver River to the east boundary of Sec. 2 in the Twp.; 18. south along the east boundary to the north boundary of Twp. 62; 19. east along the north boundary of Twp. 62 to the east boundary of the west half of Sec. 35 in Twp. 62, Rge. 10 W4; 20. south along the east boundary of the west half of Secs. 35, 26, 23, 14, 11 and 2 to the north boundary of the south half of Sec. 2 in the Twp.; 21. east along the north boundary of the south half of Secs. 2 and 1 in the Twp. and along the north boundary of the south half of Sec. 6 in Twp. 62, Rge. 9 W4 to the east boundary of Sec. 6; 22. south along the east boundary to the north boundary of Twp. 61; 23. east along the north boundary to the east boundary of the west half of Sec. 32 in Twp. 61, Rge. 9 W4; 24. south along the east boundary of the west half of Secs. 32, 29, 20, 17, 8 and 5 in Twp. 61 to the north boundary of Twp. 60; 25. east along the north boundary to the east boundary of Sec. 32 in Twp. 60, Rge. 9 W4; 26. south along the east boundary of Secs. 32, 29 and 20 to the north boundary of Sec. 16 in the Twp.; 27. east along the north boundary of Secs. 16, 15, 14 and 13 to the east boundary of the west half of Sec. 13 in the Twp.; 28. south along the east boundary of the west half of Secs. 13, 12 and 1 in the Twp. and the east boundary of the west half of Secs. 36, 25, 24, 13, 12 and 11 in Twp. 59, Rge. 9 W4 to the north boundary of Twp. 58; 29. east along the north boundary to the west boundary of Kehewin Indian Reserve No. 123; 30. south and east along the Kehewin Indian Reserve No. 123 boundary to the north boundary of Twp. 58; 31. east along the north boundary of Twp. 58 to the east boundary of Rge. 4 W4; 32. south along the east boundary of Rge. 4 to the north boundary of Puskiakiwenin Indian Reserve No. 122; 33. west, south and east along Indian Reserve No. 122 to the west boundary of Unipouheous Indian Reserve No. 121; 34. south, east and south along the boundary of Indian Reserve No. 121 to the north boundary of the south half of Sec. 10 in Twp. 56, Rge. 3 W4; 35. west along the north boundary of the south half of Sec. 10 to the east boundary of the west half of Sec. 10 in Twp. 56, Rge. 3 W4; 36. south along the east boundary of the west half of Secs. 10 and 3 to the north boundary of Twp. 55, Rge. 3 W4; 37. west along the north boundary of Twp. 55 to the east boundary of Sec. 33; 38. south along the east boundary of Secs. 33, 28, 21, 16, 9 and 4 in Twp. 55, Rge. 3 W4 to the north boundary of Twp. 54; 39. west along the north boundary of Twp. 54 to the intersection with the right bank of the North Saskatchewan River; 40. upstream along the right bank of the river to the north boundary of Sec. 21, Twp. 55, Rge. 4 W4; 41. west along the north boundary of Secs. 21, 20 and 19 in the Twp. and Secs. 24, 23, 22, 21, 20 and 19 in Twp. 55, Rge. 5 W4 and Secs. 24 and 23 in Twp. 55, Rge. 6 W4 to the east boundary of Sec. 22 in the Twp.; 42. south along Secs. 22, 15, 10 and 3 in the Twp. and Secs. 34, 27, 22, 15, 10 and 3 in Twp. 54, Rge. 6 W4; 43. south along the east boundary of Secs. 34, 27 and 22 to the north boundary of Sec. 15 in Twp. 53; 44. west along the north boundary of Secs. 15, 16, 17 and 18 in Rge. 6 W4 and Secs. 13 and 14 in Rge. 7 W4 to the east boundary of Sec. 15 in Rge. 7 W4; 45. south along the east boundary of Secs. 15, 10 and 3 in Twp. 53 and Sec. 34 in Twp. 52 to the north boundary of Sec. 27 in Twp. 52, Rge. 7 W4; 46. west along the north boundary of Secs. 27, 28, 29 and 30 in Rge. 7 W4 and Secs. 25 and 26 in Rge. 8 W4 to the east boundary of the west half of Sec. 35 in Twp. 52, Rge. 8 W4; 47. north along the east boundary of the west half of Sec. 35 to the north boundary of the south half of Sec. 35; 48. west along the north boundary of the south half of Secs. 35 and 34 to the east boundary of the west half of Sec. 34; 49. north along the east boundary of the west half of Sec. 34 to the north boundary of Twp. 52, Rge. 8 W4; 50. west along the north boundary to the east boundary of Rge. 11 (Highway 870); 51. north along the east boundary to the north boundary of Sec. 1 in the Twp.; 52. west along the north boundary of Secs. 1, 2, 3, 4, 5 and 6 in Rges. 11 and 12 to the east boundary of Rge. 13 W4; 53. north along the east boundary of Rge. 13 to the north boundary of Sec. 12 in Twp. 53, Rge. 13 W4; 54. west along the north boundary of Secs. 12 and 11 to the east boundary of Sec. 15 in the Twp.; 55. north along the east boundary of Secs. 15 and 22 to the north boundary of Sec. 22; 56. west along the north boundary of Secs. 22, 21, 20 and 19 to the east boundary of Rge. 14 W4; 57. north along the east boundary of Rge. 14 to the north boundary of Sec. 12 in Twp. 54, Rge. 14 W4; 58. west along the north boundary of Secs. 12, 11, 10, 9, 8 and 7 in Twp. 54, Rges. 14 and 15 W4 to the east boundary of Rge. 16 W4; 59. north along the east boundary of Rge. 16 to the north boundary of Twp. 54; 60. east along the north boundary to the east boundary of Sec. 6 in Twp. 55, Rge. 15 W4; 61. north along the east boundary of Secs. 6 and 7 to the north boundary of Sec. 7 in Twp. 55, Rge. 15 W4; 62. west along the north boundary of Sec. 7 to the east boundary of Rge. 16; 63. north along the east boundary of Rge. 16 to the north boundary of Sec. 18 in Twp. 56, Rge. 15 W4; 64. east along the north boundary of Secs. 18 and 17 to the east boundary of the west half of Sec. 20 in Twp. 56, Rge. 15 W4; 65. north along the east boundary of the west half of Sec. 20 to the north boundary of Sec. 20; 66. east along the north boundary of the Sec. to the east boundary of Sec. 29; 67. north along the east boundary of Secs. 29 and 32 in the Twp. and north along the east boundary of Secs. 5, 8, 17, 20, 29 and 32 in Twp. 57 to the north boundary of Twp. 57; 68. east along the north boundary of the Twp. to the right bank of the North Saskatchewan River; 69. upstream along the right bank of the North Saskatchewan River to the east boundary of Rge. 16 W4; 70. north along the east boundary to the north boundary of Twp. 61; 71. west along the north boundary to the east boundary of Sec. 3 in Twp. 62, Rge. 18 W4; 72. north along the east boundary of Secs. 3, 10, 15, 22, 27 and 34 in the Twp. to the north boundary of Twp. 62; 73. east along the north boundary to the east boundary of Rge. 18 W4; 74. north along the east boundary to the west boundary of the Buffalo Lake Métis Settlement; 75. north and east along the boundary of the Buffalo Lake Métis Settlement to the east boundary of Rge. 17 W4; 76. north along the east boundary of Rge. 17 to the north boundary of Sec. 18 in Twp. 69, Rge. 16 W4; 77. east along Secs. 18, 17, 16, 15, 14 and 13 to the east boundary of Rge. 16 W4; 78. north along Rge. 16 to the north boundary of Twp. 75; 79. west along the north boundary of Twp. 75 to the intersection with the right bank of the Athabasca River; 80. north along the right bank to the starting point.

=== Representation history ===
Members of the Legislative Assembly for Lac La Biche-St. Paul
| Assembly | Years | Member | Party |
|---|---|---|---|
See Athabasca-Lac La Biche and St. Paul before 1993
| 23rd | 1993–1994 | Paul Langevin | Liberal |
| 23rd | 1994–1995 | Paul Langevin | Independent |
| 23rd | 1995–1997 | Paul Langevin | Progressive; Conservative |
| 24th | 1997–2001 | Paul Langevin | Progressive; Conservative |
| 25th | 2001–2004 | Ray Danyluk | Progressive; Conservative |
| 26th | 2004–2008 | Ray Danyluk | Progressive; Conservative |
| 27th | 2008–2012 | Ray Danyluk | Progressive; Conservative |
See Lac La Biche-St. Paul-Two Hills 2012–2019

The riding's first representative was Paul Langevin, a Franco-Albertan elected for the Liberals. He left the Liberal caucus the following year, and went on to join the governing Progressive Conservatives. He was re-elected under their banner in 1997.

Upon Langevin's retirement, the riding was won by PC candidate Ray Danyluk, who served as Alberta's Minister of Municipal Affairs, and afterwards the Minister of Infrastructure. After three terms, he was defeated in the newly renamed riding of Lac La Biche-St. Paul-Two Hills by Wildrose candidate Shayne Saskiw in the 2012 election.

== Legislative election results ==
=== 1993 ===
1993 Alberta general election
| Party | Candidate | Votes | % | ±% |
|---|---|---|---|---|
| Liberal | Paul Langevin | 5,041 | 50.73% | – |
| Progressive Conservative | John Trefanko | 3,897 | 39.22% | – |
| New Democratic | Eugene Houle | 999 | 10.05% | – |
| Total valid votes | | 9,937 | – | – |
| Rejected, spoiled, and declined | | 28 | – | – |
| Electors / turnout | | 16,011 | 62.24% | – |
| Liberal pickup new district. | | | | |
Source(s) Source: "Lac La Biche-St. Paul Official Results 1993 Alberta general election". Alberta Heritage Community Foundation.

=== 1997 ===
1997 Alberta general election
| Party | Candidate | Votes | % | ±% |
|---|---|---|---|---|
| Progressive Conservative | Paul Langevin | 4,799 | 53.88% | 14.66% |
| Liberal | Vital Ouellette | 2,901 | 32.57% | -18.16% |
| Social Credit | Peter Tychkowsky | 483 | 5.42% | – |
| New Democratic | Grace Johnston | 419 | 4.70% | -5.35% |
| Forum | Don Ronaghan | 191 | 2.14% | – |
| Independent | Louis Real Theriault | 114 | 1.28% | – |
| Total | | 8,907 | – | – |
| Rejected, spoiled and declined | | 28 | – | – |
| Eligible electors / turnout | | 14,448 | 61.84% | -0.40% |
| Progressive Conservative gain from Liberal | | Swing | | 4.90% |
Source(s) Source: "Lac La Biche-St. Paul Official Results 1997 Alberta general election". Alberta Heritage Community Foundation.

=== 2001 ===
2001 Alberta general election
| Party | Candidate | Votes | % | ±% |
|---|---|---|---|---|
| Progressive Conservative | Ray Danyluk | 5,335 | 60.04% | 6.16% |
| Liberal | Vital Ouellette | 3,195 | 35.96% | 3.39% |
| New Democratic | John Williams | 356 | 4.01% | -0.70% |
| Total | | 8,886 | – | – |
| Rejected, spoiled and declined | | 18 | – | – |
| Eligible electors / turnout | | 15,641 | 56.93% | -4.92% |
| Progressive Conservative hold | | Swing | | 1.39% |
Source(s) Source: "Lac La Biche-St. Paul Official Results 2001 Alberta general election". Alberta Heritage Community Foundation.

=== 2004 ===
2004 Alberta general election
| Party | Candidate | Votes | % | ±% |
|---|---|---|---|---|
| Progressive Conservative | Ray Danyluk | 4,896 | 53.64% | -6.40% |
| Liberal | Dickson Broomfield | 1,879 | 20.59% | -15.37% |
| Alberta Alliance | Oscar Lacombe | 1,703 | 18.66% | – |
| New Democratic | Phil Goebel | 649 | 7.11% | 3.10% |
| Total | | 9,127 | – | – |
| Rejected, spoiled and declined | | 25 | – | – |
| Eligible electors / turnout | | 18,451 | 49.60% | -7.33% |
| Progressive Conservative hold | | Swing | | 4.49% |
Source(s) Source: "Elections Alberta 2004 General Election" (PDF). Elections Alberta.

=== 2008 ===
2008 Alberta general election
| Party | Candidate | Votes | % | ±% |
|---|---|---|---|---|
| Progressive Conservative | Ray Danyluk | 6,527 | 71.28% | +17.64% |
| Liberal | Alex Broadbent | 1,627 | 17.77% | -2.82% |
| New Democratic | Della Dury | 1,003 | 10.95% | +3.84% |
| Total valid votes | | 9,157 | 100.00% | – |
| Rejected, spoiled and declined | | 74 | – | – |
| Electors/turnout | | 20,872 | 44.23% | -5.51% |
| Progressive Conservative hold | | Swing | | +10.23% |
Source(s) Source: The Report on the March 3, 2008 Provincial General Election of the Twenty-seventh Legislative Assembly. Elections Alberta. July 28, 2008. pp. 424–429.

== Senate nominee elections results ==
=== 2004 ===
| 2004 Senate nominee election results: Lac La Biche-St. Paul | | | | Turnout 48.88% | |
| Affiliation | Candidate | Votes | % votes | % ballots | 'Rank |
| Progressive Conservative | Betty Unger | 3,417 | 14.60% | 45.88% | 2 |
| Progressive Conservative | Bert Brown | 3,165 | 13.52% | 42.50% | 1 |
| Independent | Link Byfield | 2,683 | 11.46% | 36.03% | 4 |
| Progressive Conservative | Cliff Breitkreuz | 2,517 | 10.75% | 33.80% | 3 |
| Alberta Alliance | Michael Roth | 2,142 | 9.15% | 28.76% | 7 |
| Alberta Alliance | Gary Horan | 2,127 | 9.09% | 28.56% | 10 |
| Alberta Alliance | Vance Gough | 2,054 | 8.77% | 27.58% | 8 |
| Progressive Conservative | David Usherwood | 1,924 | 8.22% | 25.84% | 6 |
| Progressive Conservative | Jim Silye | 1,897 | 8.10% | 25.47% | 5 |
| Independent | Tom Sindlinger | 1,483 | 6.34% | 19.91% | 9 |
| Total votes | | 23,409 | 100% | | |
| Total ballots | | 7,447 | 3.14 votes per ballot | | |
| Rejected, spoiled and declined | | 1,571 | | | |

Voters had the option of selecting four candidates on the ballot

== 2004 student vote results ==
Participating schools
Ecole Mallaig School

On November 19, 2004, a student vote was conducted at participating Alberta schools to parallel the 2004 Alberta general election results. The vote was designed to educate students and simulate the electoral process for persons who have not yet reached the legal majority. The vote was conducted in 80 of the 83 provincial electoral districts with students voting for actual election candidates. Schools with a large student body that reside in another electoral district had the option to vote for candidates outside of the electoral district then where they were physically located.

2004 Alberta student vote results
| Affiliation | Candidate | Votes | % |
| Progressive Conservative | Ray Danyluk | 80 | 65.04% |
| Liberal | Dickson Broomfield | 21 | 17.07% |
| NDP | Phil Goebel | 20 | 16.26% |
| Alberta Alliance | Oscar Lacombe | 2 | 1.63% |
| Total | | 123 | 100% |
| Rejected, spoiled and declined | | 3 | |

== See also ==
- List of Alberta provincial electoral districts
- Canadian provincial electoral districts
