= Jeff Johnson (Alberta politician) =

Canadian business man and politician

The Honourable Jeff Johnson ECA

Member of the Legislative Assembly of Alberta for Athabasca-Redwater
- In office March 3, 2008 – May 5, 2015
- Preceded by: Mike Cardinal
- Succeeded by: Colin Piquette

Personal details
- Born: 1966 or 1967 (age 58–59) Camrose, Alberta
- Party: Progressive Conservative
- Spouse: Kim
- Children: 2 sons, 1 daughter

Jeffrey David Johnson ECA (born c. 1967) is a Canadian business man and politician who was a Member of the Legislative Assembly of Alberta (MLA) and Minister in three senior cabinet positions.

Johnson was elected to the Alberta Legislature for the first time in the 2008 Alberta general election. He held the Athabasca-Redwater district for the Progressive Conservatives, winning in a landslide with almost 70% of the popular vote defeating four other candidates. He went on to do this twice.

On October 12, 2011 he was sworn in as Minister of Infrastructure in the cabinet of Alison Redford. He also served as Political Minister-Northern Alberta, and as Board Vice-Chair of the Alberta Treasury Board, overseeing budgets of over seven billion dollars for four Premiers. Among its many responsibilities, the Board oversees the Alberta Investment Management Corporation (AIMCO), one of Canada's largest and most diversified institutional investment fund managers with a total investment portfolio of approximately $84 billion.

Johnson was also a member of the Cabinet Policy Committee on Finance and the Standing Committees on the Economy and Public Safety and Services.

He served as Minister of Education from April 2012 until September 2014, and chaired the Council of Ministers of Education Canada (CMEC). As chair of CMEC, Johnson co-proposed a major initiative for Aboriginal education that was supported by Canada's Education Ministers and the Assembly of First Nations National Chief; hosted and co-chaired Canada's National Skills Symposium, "Skills for the Future"; hosted and co-chaired the Third High-Level Consultation on Education Collaboration between the Provinces and Territories of Canada and the People's Republic of China (3HLC); headed the Canadian delegation at the Organisation for Economic Co-operation and Development (OPECD) skills symposium for Education Ministers, "Fostering Skills and Employability Through Education", in Istanbul, Turkey; and headed the Canadian delegation at the 2012 Asia-Pacific Economic Cooperation (APEC) Education Ministerial Meeting in Korea.

On September 15, 2014 he was sworn in as Minister of Seniors in the cabinet of Jim Prentice, serving in this portfolio until an NDP majority in the May 5, 2015 provincial election.

During his time as a Member of the Legislative Assembly, Johnson co-chaired the Steering Committee on Inspiring Education, chaired the Alberta Recreation Corridors Coordinating Committee, chaired the MLA Library Review Committee, and served on several committees of the Legislative Assembly including Public Accounts. He also served as Parliamentary Assistant to the President of the Treasury Board (Oil Sands Sustainable Development Secretariat).

While in political office, Johnson was distinguished for championing excellence in education when named to Canada's top 10 Edtech News-makers of the Year in 2012 for "leadership, innovative thinking and embracing 21st-century learning within his province and beyond".

He was recognized for his impact on Alberta with a Queen Elizabeth II Diamond Jubilee Medal which "honour[s] significant contributions and achievements by Canadians."

Sport and recreation have played an important role in his life, especially hockey, as a junior and college player, coach, trainer, and friend of many players, including many who have gone on to notable NHL careers. He has additional experience working first-hand in financial markets as a futures trading-floor pit boss, and as a sales executive for life insurance and related investment funds. He has also owned and operated several small businesses.

Prior to being elected, Johnson was the President and owner of the largest regional Xerox sales agency in western Canada. He ran his agency successfully for 10 years before joining provincial politics; in his time as an entrepreneur he was awarded Xerox Canada Agent of the Year three times and was appointed as one of six members to the National Agent Council for Xerox Canada.

Johnson has a bachelor of arts in psychology from Camrose Lutheran College and continues to be an active member of his community.

He and his wife, Kim, who is an art therapist, along with their two sons and daughter live in Athabasca.

== Electoral history ==
2008 Alberta general election: Athabasca-Redwater
| Party | Candidate | Votes | % | ±% |
|---|---|---|---|---|
| Progressive Conservative | Jeff Johnson | 7,484 | 67.99% | 20.31% |
| Liberal | Bill Bonko Jr. | 1,379 | 12.53% | -14.65% |
| New Democratic | Peter Opryshko | 1,225 | 11.13% | -0.54% |
| Wildrose Alliance | Mike Radojcic | 517 | 4.70% | – |
| Green | Phyllis Penchuk | 403 | 3.66% | 1.55% |
| Total | | 11,008 | – | – |
| Rejected, spoiled and declined | | 15 | – | – |
| Eligible electors / turnout | | 24,394 | 45.19% | – |
| Progressive Conservative hold | | Swing | | 17.48% |
Source(s) Source: "Elections Alberta 2008 General Election". Elections Alberta.

2012 Alberta general election: Athabasca-Sturgeon-Redwater
| Party | Candidate | Votes | % | ±% |
|---|---|---|---|---|
| Progressive Conservative | Jeff Johnson | 7,384 | 48.40% | – |
| Wildrose | Travis Olson | 5,304 | 34.77% | – |
| New Democratic | Mandy Melnyk | 2,091 | 13.71% | – |
| Liberal | Gino Akbari | 476 | 3.12% | – |
| Total | | 15,255 | – | – |
| Rejected, spoiled and declined | | 106 | – | – |
| Eligible electors / turnout | | 25,658 | 59.87% | – |
| Progressive Conservative pickup new district. | | | | |
Source(s) Source: "Elections Alberta 2012 General Election". Elections Alberta.

2015 Alberta general election: Athabasca-Sturgeon-Redwater
| Party | Candidate | Votes | % | ±% |
|---|---|---|---|---|
| New Democratic | Colin Piquette | 6,797 | 40.49% | 26.79% |
| Progressive Conservative | Jeff Johnson | 5,016 | 29.88% | -18.52% |
| Wildrose | Travis Olson | 4,973 | 29.63% | -5.14% |
| Total | | 16,786 | – | – |
| Rejected, spoiled, and declined | | 50 | – | – |
| Eligible electors / turnout | | 25,826 | 65.19% | – |
| New Democratic gain from Progressive Conservative | | Swing | | -1.51% |
Source(s) Source: "Elections Alberta 2015 General Election". Elections Alberta.
