= Ray Danyluk =

Canadian politician

The Honourable Ray Danyluk ECA
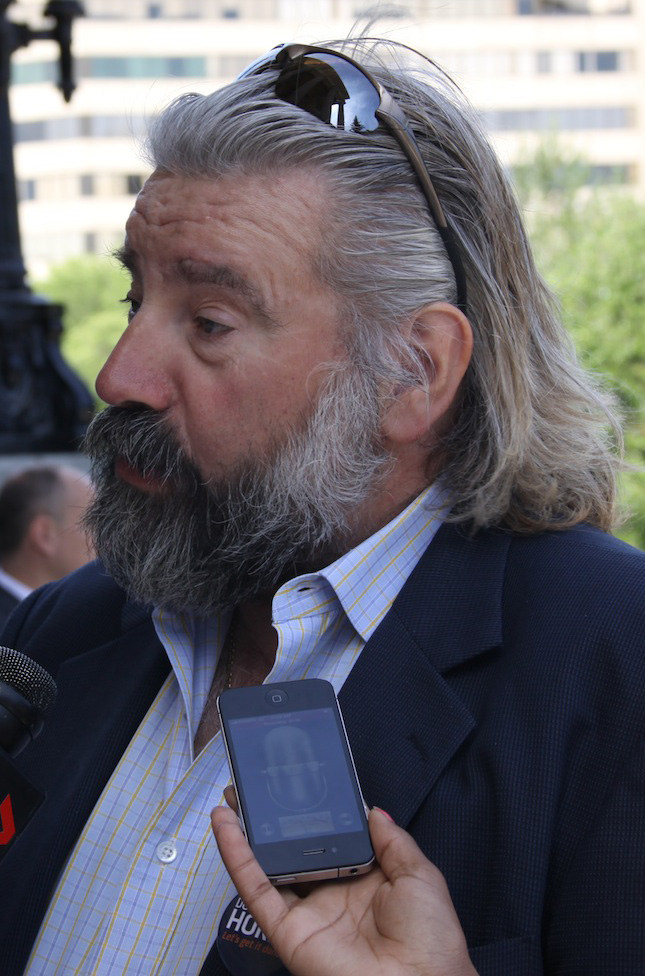

Member of the Legislative Assembly of Alberta
- In office 2001–2012
- Preceded by: Paul Langevin
- Constituency: Lac La Biche-St. Paul

Personal details
- Born: 1952 or 1953 (age 72–73) Calgary, Alberta, Canada
- Party: Progressive Conservative
- Occupation: farmer, politician

Raymond Bruce "Ray" Danyluk ECA (born 1952 or 1953) is a farmer and former provincial politician from Alberta, Canada. He served as a Member of the Legislative Assembly of Alberta from 2001 to 2012 with the Progressive Conservative caucus before being defeated by Wildrose Party candidate Shayne Saskiw in the 2012 election. During his time in office Danyluk served as a cabinet minister in the government of Premier Ed Stelmach, serving in various portfolios since 2006.

== Early life ==
Danyluk was born in Calgary, Alberta, Canada. He attended post secondary education at the University of Alberta. He farms near the community of Elk Point, Alberta.

== Political career ==
Danyluk ran for a seat to the Alberta Legislature as a Progressive Conservative candidate in the 2001 Alberta general election. He ran in the electoral district of Lac La Biche-St. Paul in a hotly contested three candidate race. The seat was open due to the departure of incumbent Paul Langevin. Danyluk held the seat for the Progressive Conservatives to win his first term in office. He faced a strong challenge from Liberal candidate Vital Ouellette but still finished first by a couple thousand votes.

Danyluk ran for a second term in office in the 2004 Alberta general election. He faced three opposition candidates including the former Sergent at Arms of the Legislature Oscar Lacombe who ran under the Alberta Alliance banner. Danyluk held his seat winning just over half the popular vote, despite seeing a decline in his support. The Liberal candidate saw his party's popular vote almost cut in half but still managed to finish a distant second, while Lacombe finished a close third out of fourth place.

Premier Ed Stelmach appointed Danyluk to his first cabinet portfolio in the Executive Council of Alberta as Minister of Municipal Affairs and Housing on 15 December 2006.

Danyluk ran for a third term in office in the 2008 Alberta general election with ministerial advantage. He faced two other candidates significantly increasing his popular vote returning to office with a landslide majority.

Premier Stelmach slightly changed Danyluk's cabinet portfolio after the 2008 election. On 12 March 2008 he became Minister of Municipal Affairs. He held that portfolio until Stelmach appointed him as Minister of Infrastructure on 15 January 2010.
