= Colin Piquette =

Canadian politician

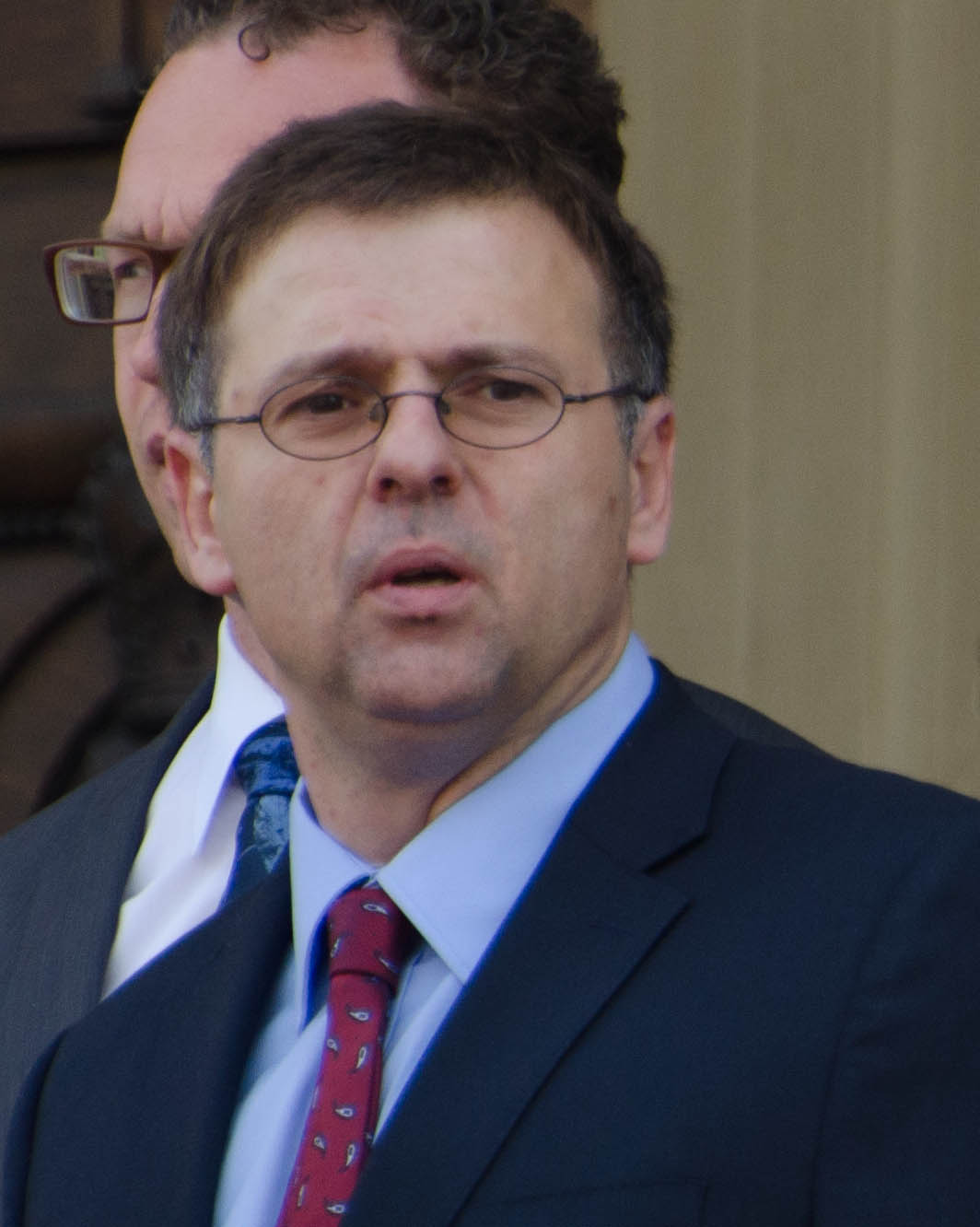
- Piquette in May 2015

Member of the Legislative Assembly of Alberta for Athabasca-Sturgeon-Redwater
- In office May 5, 2015 – March 19, 2019
- Preceded by: Jeff Johnson
- Succeeded by: district abolished

Personal details
- Born: 1969 or 1970 (age 55–56) near Plamondon, Alberta
- Party: Alberta New Democratic Party
- Occupation: Insurance agent

Colin Leo Piquette (born 1969 or 1970) is a Canadian politician who was elected in the 2015 Alberta general election to the Legislative Assembly of Alberta as the member for the electoral district of Athabasca-Sturgeon-Redwater. He did not run for re-election in 2019. He is the son of former NDP MLA Leo Piquette.

== Electoral history ==
=== 2015 general election ===
2015 Alberta general election: Athabasca-Sturgeon-Redwater
Party	Candidate	Votes	%	±%
New Democratic	Colin Piquette	6,797	40.49%	26.79%
Progressive Conservative	Jeff Johnson	5,016	29.88%	-18.52%
Wildrose	Travis Olson	4,973	29.63%	-5.14%
Total		16,786	–	–
Rejected, spoiled, and declined		50	–	–
Eligible electors / turnout		25,826	65.19%	–
New Democratic gain from Progressive Conservative		Swing		-1.51%
Source(s) Source: "Elections Alberta 2015 General Election". Elections Alberta.
