= Drayton Valley (provincial electoral district) =

Defunct provincial electoral district in Alberta, Canada

Alberta electoral district

Defunct provincial electoral district
- Legislature: Legislative Assembly of Alberta
- District created: 1971
- District abolished: 1993
- First contested: 1971
- Last contested: 1989

Drayton Valley was a provincial electoral district in Alberta, Canada, mandated to return a single member to the Legislative Assembly of Alberta using the first-past-the-post method of voting from 1971 to 1993.

== History ==
The Drayton Valley electoral district was formed from the Stony Plain, Leduc, Edson, and Wetaskwin electoral districts prior to the 1930 Alberta general election. The Drayton Valley electoral district would be abolished and the Drayton Valley-Calmar electoral district would be formed in its place prior to the 1993 Alberta general election.

=== Members of the Legislative Assembly (MLAs) ===
Members of the Legislative Assembly for Drayton Valley
Assembly	Years	Member	Party
See Stony Plain electoral district from 1905-1971, Leduc electoral district from 1905-1971, Wetaskwin electoral district from 1905-1971 and Edson electoral district from 1913-1971
17th	1971–1975	Rudolph Zander	Progressive Conservative
18th	1975–1979	Rudolph Zander	Progressive Conservative
19th	1969–1982	Shirley Cripps	Progressive Conservative
20th	1982–1986	Shirley Cripps	Progressive Conservative
21st	1986–1989	Shirley Cripps	Progressive Conservative
22nd	1989–1993	Tom Thurber	Progressive Conservative
See Drayton Valley-Calmar electoral district from 1993-2012

== Election results ==
=== 1971 ===
1971 Alberta general election
Party	Candidate	Votes	%	±%
Progressive Conservative	Rudolph Zander	2,603	53.45%	–
Social Credit	Thomas Johnson	1,304	26.78%	–
New Democratic	Alvin Harmacy	963	19.77%	–
Total		4,870	–	–
Rejected, spoiled and declined		28	–	–
Eligible electors / turnout		7,235	67.70%	–
Progressive Conservative pickup new district.				
Source(s) Source: "Drayton Valley Official Results 1971 Alberta general election". Alberta Heritage Community Foundation.

=== 1975 ===
1975 Alberta general election
Party	Candidate	Votes	%	±%
Progressive Conservative	Rudolph Zander	3,224	67.97%	14.52%
New Democratic	Lars Larson	815	17.18%	-2.59%
Social Credit	Tom Johnson	513	10.82%	-15.96%
Liberal	Maurice Duteau	191	4.03%	–
Total		4,743	–	–
Rejected, spoiled and declined		14	–	–
Eligible electors / turnout		7,515	63.30%	-4.40%
Progressive Conservative hold		Swing		12.06%
Source(s) Source: "Drayton Valley Official Results 1975 Alberta general election". Alberta Heritage Community Foundation.

=== 1979 ===
1979 Alberta general election
Party	Candidate	Votes	%	±%
Progressive Conservative	Shirley Cripps	3,530	56.95%	-11.02%
New Democratic	Gerry Hutchinson	1,290	20.81%	3.63%
Social Credit	Phil Turner	1,284	20.72%	9.90%
Liberal	Harold Knopke	94	1.52%	-2.51%
Total		6,198	–	–
Rejected, spoiled and declined		N/A	–	–
Eligible electors / turnout		9,330	66.43%	3.13%
Progressive Conservative hold		Swing		-7.32%
Source(s) Source: "Drayton Valley Official Results 1979 Alberta general election". Alberta Heritage Community Foundation.

=== 1982 ===
1982 Alberta general election
Party	Candidate	Votes	%	±%
Progressive Conservative	Shirley Cripps	4,906	66.97%	10.01%
Western Canada Concept	George Perdicaris	1,265	17.27%	–
New Democratic	Lynne Martin	1,155	15.77%	-5.05%
Total		7,326	–	–
Rejected, spoiled and declined		24	–	–
Eligible electors / turnout		10,400	70.67%	4.24%
Progressive Conservative hold		Swing		6.78%
Source(s) Source: "Drayton Valley Official Results 1982 Alberta general election". Alberta Heritage Community Foundation.

=== 1986 ===
1986 Alberta general election
Party	Candidate	Votes	%	±%
Progressive Conservative	Shirley Cripps	5,330	61.13%	-5.84%
New Democratic	Lawrence Dublenko	2,275	26.09%	10.33%
Liberal	Phil J. Gibeau	594	6.81%	–
Representative	Ron Williams	301	3.45%	–
Western Canada Concept	Gordon Reid	219	2.51%	-14.76%
Total		8,719	–	–
Rejected, spoiled and declined		19	–	–
Eligible electors / turnout		17,513	49.89%	-20.78%
Progressive Conservative hold		Swing		-7.33%
Source(s) Source: "Drayton Valley Official Results 1986 Alberta general election". Alberta Heritage Community Foundation.

=== 1989 ===
1989 Alberta general election
Party	Candidate	Votes	%	±%
Progressive Conservative	Tom Thurber	4,563	45.58%	-15.55%
Liberal	G. (Bear) Werschler	2,826	28.23%	21.42%
New Democratic	Lynne Martin	2,622	26.19%	0.10%
Total		10,011	–	–
Rejected, spoiled and declined		22	–	–
Eligible electors / turnout		17,990	55.77%	5.88%
Progressive Conservative hold		Swing		-8.84%
Source(s) Source: "Drayton Valley Official Results 1989 Alberta general election". Alberta Heritage Community Foundation.

== See also ==
- List of Alberta provincial electoral districts
- Canadian provincial electoral districts
- Drayton Valley, a town in central Alberta
