= Shane Dawson (baseball) =

Canadian professional baseball pitcher

- Pitcher
- Born: September 9, 1993 (age 32); Drayton Valley, Alberta, Canada
- Bats: Right Throws: Left
- Stats at Baseball Reference
Medals
Men's baseball
Representing Canada
Pan American Games
Gold medal – first place	2015 Toronto	Team

Shane James Dawson (born September 9, 1993) is a Canadian former professional baseball pitcher.

== High school and college ==
Dawson attended Frank Maddock High School, and was the first 17-year-old to play for the Kelowna Falcons of the West Coast League. He then attended Lethbridge College.

== Professional career ==
=== Toronto Blue Jays ===
Dawson was selected in the 17th round of the 2012 MLB draft by the Toronto Blue Jays. He was assigned to the Gulf Coast League Blue Jays for the 2012 season, where he pitched 30 2/3 innings and posted a 2–1 record, 2.35 ERA, and 35 strikeouts. Dawson began the 2013 season with the Bluefield Blue Jays of the Appalachian League, and was later promoted to the Vancouver Canadians of the Northwest League. After 4 starts for Vancouver, Dawson reported left elbow pain, and fearing Tommy John surgery, was rested for the remainder of the season. He would pitch to a combined 2–4 record, 3.13 ERA, and 61 strikeouts in 46 innings. After reporting to fall instructional camp, doctors discovered that he had been born without a left infraspinatus muscle.

Dawson spent the entire 2014 campaign with the Single-A Lansing Lugnuts, making 14 appearances (10 starts) before being shut down in July due to arm fatigue. He would earn a 3–5 record, 3.38 ERA, and 46 strikeouts in 56 innings pitched. He began the 2015 season with Lansing, where he was named a Midwest League All-Star, and was selected to play for the Canada national baseball team at the Pan American Games, winning the gold medal. After the Games he returned to Lansing and continued his run of success, earning his league-leading 12th win before being called up to the Advanced-A Dunedin Blue Jays on August 1. Dawson finished the 2015 season with Dunedin, and in 24 total games, pitched to a 15–6 record, 3.03 ERA, and 120 strikeouts in 127 2/3 innings. He played the entire 2016 season with the Double-A New Hampshire Fisher Cats, where he posted a 10–4 record, 4.22 ERA, and 95 strikeouts in a career-high 134 1/3 innings pitched. Dawson returned to New Hampshire in 2017, posting a 4–9 record with a 6.16 ERA in 27 games. Dawson was released from the Blue Jays organization prior to the 2018 season.

=== Winnipeg Goldeyes ===
On April 23, 2018, Dawson signed with the Winnipeg Goldeyes of the American Association of Independent Professional Baseball. In five starts for Winnipeg, he posted a 3-1 record and 3.38 ERA with 16 strikeouts over 24 innings of work. Dawson was released by the Goldeyes on July 11.
