= Tony Abbott (Alberta politician) =

Canadian politician

Clarke Anthony Abbott

MLA for Drayton Valley-Calmar
- In office March 12, 2001 – March 3, 2008
- Preceded by: Tom Thurber
- Succeeded by: Diana McQueen

Personal details
- Born: November 24, 1966 (age 59) York County, Ontario, Canada
- Party: Progressive Conservative
- Occupation: Pastor

Clarke Anthony (Tony) Abbott (born November 24, 1966) is a Canadian politician and former member of the Legislative Assembly of Alberta. He represented Drayton Valley-Calmar and sat as a Progressive Conservative from 2001 until 2008.

== Early life ==
Abbott was born November 24, 1966, in York County, Ontario. In 1988 he graduated from Christianview Bible College with a Bachelor of Theology. He came west to serve as Senior Pastor of the Faith Evangelical Covenant Church in Breton, Alberta, a position that he held from 1989 until 2000. In 1998 he was elected trustee for the Wild Rose school division. He served one term in this capacity, and did not seek re-election in 2001.

== Political career ==
Abbott first sought election to the Legislative Assembly of Alberta in the 2001 election, when he ran as a Progressive Conservative in Drayton Valley-Calmar. He won, taking approximately 68% of the vote. He was re-elected in the 2004 election with a reduced 59% majority. In the 2006 leadership election, he was the first MLA to back Ted Morton's leadership bid.

In October 2007, Abbott was defeated by Drayton Valley mayor Diana McQueen in his bid to again secure the P.C. nomination for the 2008 election. He later publicly speculated about running for one of the province's other conservative parties, such as the Alberta Alliance, the Social Credit Party, or the Wildrose Party. He ultimately did not run, citing a fear of splitting the conservative vote with McQueen and expressing his support for Progressive Conservative leader Ed Stelmach, who he called a "great man".

=== Legislative initiatives ===
==== First term ====
In 2001, Abbott introduced the Citizens' Initiative Act, a private member's bill that would have allowed any Albertan 18 years or older to sponsor a draft law by obtaining signatures from a number of eligible voters equal to 10% of the votes cast in the most recent provincial election, such signatories being required to include voters representing at least 10% of the votes cast in the election in at least two thirds of the province's ridings. If these signatures were collected in a six-month period, the proposed law would be put to province-wide referendum. If the referendum was passed by a vote of at least 60%, including 60% in at least two thirds of the province's ridings, it would be introduced in the legislature to be passed, amended, or defeated like any other bill. The bill never reached second reading in the Legislature.

In 2002, Abbott introduced the government bill Occupational Health and Safety Amendment Act, designed to stiffen penalties for employers violating occupational health and safety laws. It was unanimously adopted by the legislature. Also in 2002, he introduced the Fair Trading (Cost of Credit) Amendment Act, which would have required lenders under provincial jurisdiction to stipulate the annual percentage rate of the loan and which would have encouraged the government to establish consumer education programs about the cost of credit. It never reached second reading.

In 2003, Abbott sponsored three bills. The government-sponsored Insurance Amendment Act would reduce payouts insurance payouts to some victims of automobile accidents. Abbott suggested that this would reduce Albertans' car insurance premiums, but opposition MLAs, including Liberals Kevin Taft and Laurie Blakeman and New Democrat Brian Mason suggested that it would only increase insurance companies' profits. The legislature adjourned while debate on second reading of the bill was still ongoing, and it was never brought to a vote. Abbott's second 2003 bill, the Livestock Industry Diversification Amendment Act (which was also government-sponsored), dealt with domestic cervids that escape into the wild, and passed the legislature. He also sponsored a private member's bill, the Insurance (Accident Insurance Benefits) Amendment Act, which would increase the cap on payouts for injuries resulting from automobile accidents. It was postponed for six months, effectively killing it.

Abbott introduced two bills in 2004: the School Amendment Act, a government bill, expanded the responsibilities of teachers to include participation in curriculum development, assistance in developing provincial exams, and supervision of student teachers; the effect of this was to prevent teachers from withdrawing these services in work-to-rule situations. The bill also amended the process by which it was decided whether suspended teachers would be dismissed or permitted to return to the job. The bill passed the legislature. Abbott's second bill of 2004, the Insurance (Demerit Offences) Amendment Act, was a private member's bill that never reached second reading. It would have made it illegal for insurance companies to charge higher insurance premiums based on demerits assigned to drivers more than two years prior to an application for insurance.

==== Second term ====
Abbott's sole 2005 bill was the Animal Protection Amendment Act, a government bill which assigned an active duty to persons responsible for the care of an animal to provide it with sufficient "ventilation, space, food, water or veterinary care or reasonable protection from injurious heat or cold" (the existing act required only the provision of sufficient food, water, care, and shelter). It also provided whistleblower protection to reporters of animal abuse. It was supported by the Liberals and New Democrats, although Alberta Alliance leader Paul Hinman expressed concern that by providing a more exhaustive list of things which must be provided to animals, courts might be increasingly inclined to regard anything not explicitly listed as not being obligated. It passed the legislative assembly and was signed into law by Lieutenant Governor of Alberta Norman Kwong.

In 2006 Abbott introduced the Parental Consent to Medical Treatment for Minors Act, which would require parental consent for minors under the age of 16 to access non-emergency medical treatment. Abbott and other proponents of the bill, including Progressive Conservatives Richard Marz, Victor Doerksen, David Rodney, and Cindy Ady, cited the example of plastic surgery (including breast augmentation, liposuction, and rhinoplasty) as examples of the treatments the bill was targeted at. Opponents, such as Liberals Bruce Miller, Weslyn Mather, and Harry Chase, New Democrat David Eggen, and Progressive Conservative Thomas Lukaszuk suggested that minors were unlikely to be able to afford such procedures without parental involvement anyway, and that the bill's true target was abortion. Alberta Alliance leader Hinman, meanwhile, cited abortion as a reason that he was in support of the bill. The bill was ultimately postponed for six months (with Abbott's support - in response to the comments of Progressive Conservative Lyle Oberg, a medical doctor, Abbott agreed that the breadth of medical treatments covered under the bill required further study), effectively killing it, since the legislature was not in session six months later.

During the 2007 session, Abbott's last in the legislature (except for the 2008 session, which consisted only of a throne speech), he sponsored two successful government bills. The Farm Implement Amendment Act allowed financial institutions to lease farm equipment to farmers, a privilege previously reserved for implement dealers. The Mental Health Amendment Act, which he had planned to introduce as a private member's bill before it gained support from previous health minister Iris Evans, to reduce the requirement for involuntary institutionalization of the mentally ill from "in a condition presenting or likely to present a danger to self or others," which courts had interpreted as requiring the presence of imminent danger, to "likely to cause harm to the person or others". The bill also allowed authorities to force patients to adhere to physician-mandated treatment plans even once they were no longer hospitalized. The bill passed after extensive debate, with Liberal Rick Miller announcing moments before the vote that he still didn't know which way he was going to vote.

=== Comments on Belinda Stronach ===
Abbott made national headlines in 2005 when, in response to federal Member of Parliament Belinda Stronach crossing the floor from the Conservatives to the Liberals, he made comments to the media characterizing Stronach's actions as "whoring herself out for power". He was criticized for these comments by his Liberal colleague Rick Miller, who later alleged that Abbott confronted him physically in the corridor behind the legislative chamber following his speech. Abbott later apologized for his comments.

== Post-political life ==
In an interview on the eve of his departure from the legislature, Abbott said that he saw himself returning to politics, either at the provincial or the federal level. However, he said that he wouldn't run against local member of the House of Commons of Canada Rob Merrifield until the latter was ready to retire, calling the prospect of challenging him in a nomination fight "unethical". Tony currently lives in San Antonio, Texas where he owns and operates a small printing business, "Presto Printing".

== Election results ==
2001 Alberta general election: Drayton Valley-Calmar
Party	Candidate	Votes	%	±%
Progressive Conservative	Tony Abbott	7,673	68.39%	7.80%
Liberal	Roger Coles	2,229	19.87%	-7.31%
Independent	Roger Stefura	729	6.50%	1.94%
New Democratic	Mark Patty	588	5.24%	-2.44%
Total		11,219	–	–
Rejected, spoiled, and declined		17	–	–
Eligible electors / turnout		18,416	61.01%	-0.91%
Progressive Conservative hold		Swing		7.56%
Source(s) Source: "Drayton Valley-Calmar Official Results 2001 Alberta general election". Alberta Heritage Community Foundation.

2004 Alberta general election: Drayton Valley-Calmar
Party	Candidate	Votes	%	±%
Progressive Conservative	Tony Abbott	5,225	59.30%	-9.09%
Greens	Edwin Erickson	929	10.54%	–
Liberal	Laura Higgerty	890	10.10%	-9.77%
Alberta Alliance	Viona Cunningham	766	8.69%	–
New Democratic	Lynn Oberle	642	7.29%	2.05%
Social Credit	Thomas Cliff	243	2.76%	–
Independent	Elmer Knopp	116	1.32%	–
Total		8,811	–	–
Rejected, spoiled and declined		49	–	–
Eligible electors / turnout		19,214	46.11%	-14.90%
Progressive Conservative hold		Swing		0.12%
Source(s) Source: "Drayton Valley-Calmar Official Results 2004 Alberta general election". Alberta Heritage Community Foundation.
