= Holy Trinity Academy (Drayton Valley) =

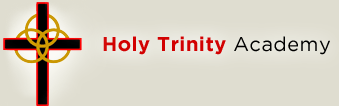

Location
- 4749 45 Avenue; Drayton Valley, Alberta, T7A 0B6; Canada; 53.216°N 114.992°W

Information
- School type: High School
- Motto: "Called by the Father, Son and Holy Spirit"
- Religious affiliation: Roman Catholic
- Founded: 2008
- School board: St. Thomas Aquinas Roman Catholic Separate Regional Division No. 38
- Superintendent: Jamie McNamara
- Area trustee: Sandra Bannard; Susan Kathol
- Administrator: Deborah McCourt
- Principal: Jamie Beauchamp
- Grades: 9-12
- Enrollment: 120
- Language: English
- Colours: Red, Gold, and Black
- Team name: Holy Trinity Tigers
- Website: ht.starcatholic.ab.ca

Holy Trinity Academy is a Catholic High School in the town of Drayton Valley, Alberta. Its first graduating class was the Class of 2009.

== History ==
=== Early Negotiations ===
Early talk of opening a new High School to accommodate more room in the existing Catholic School, St. Anthony School, started in about 2006. Design and funding were going to be split between the Town of Drayton Valley and Wild Rose School Division, both of whom were going to build one section each of the atri-facility complex. Drayton Valley would build a Field House and Wild Rose, a new building for the public Junior High School. Both other partners pulled out due to contracting prices and the current economic crisis, while STAR Catholic went on with the project, because of funding approval. The Town, however, did build a small public library outlet, sponsored by Rotary International, that can be accessed through the school.

=== Opening and 2008-09 Year ===
At the beginning of the 2008 school year, the building for the school was not ready to be utilized by students and staff, so students were housed in the pre-existing Catholic school until after spring break. After spring break 2009, classes resumed in the new Holy Trinity Academy.

=== 2009-present ===
Under the new administration, HTA started a Social Justice program to stress to pupils the importance of people, as citizens of the world. The first year's Social Justice retreat focused on poverty, and after the 2010 Haiti earthquake, took place many fundraisers were started to donate to the Red Cross. In 2011, the committee for Social Justice chose the position of "recycling". In 2011, during their annual Christmas Food Drive, brought approximately 100 students to raise 1230 items for the local food bank.

=== Administration ===
The Opening Principal maintained her position at St. Anthony School, as well as the new school to start the school off on a positive footing. The next year she did not return as principal for Holy Trinity, just St. Anthony. The then Vice-Principal took the lead position, while the school board made no appointment for a replacement Vice-Principal.

| | 2008–2009 | 2009–2015 | 2015–Present |
|---|---|---|---|
| Principal | Trudy McDonnell | Mark Basaraba | Jamie Beauchamp |
| Vice Principal | Mark Basaraba | No Appointment | Keri-Lynn Clark |
| Administrator | Deborah McCourt | | |

== Students ==
Most students come from the Preschool-Grade 8 catholic school as a natural transition. Many students live in Drayton Valley or the surrounding Brazeau County. The current enrollment is about 120 students, the Grade 10 class being the most populous.

=== Clubs and organizations ===
Besides the Social Justice Committee, the Students Union has played an influential role in the school's lifestyle. They host many dances and fundraisers for the school. The Yearbook Committee has recently started, as well as an intramural program, headed by one of the students, to promote leadership and a healthy lifestyle. As of the 2011–12 school year, the Social Justice Committee, Students Union, Yearbook Elective, Lunch Intramural Program, Lunchtime Canteen, and the new "What Goes Around Comes Around" project, make the core of extracurricular activities. What Goes Around Comes Around is a new team made up of kids from the school focusing on vermicompost and how it can fuel the schools new horticulture elective.

== Athletics ==
Volleyball, basketball, badminton, golf, and a track team are all offered at Holy Trinity. Talks of a football team have started, but most students interested play for the Frank Maddock High School team. A rugby team has had some initial interest, but progress has not yet been taken. Most teams at Holy Trinity play in the Tri-County League, if applicable to their team structure.

| | 2008 | 2009 | 2010 | 2011 | 2012 |
|---|---|---|---|---|---|
| Volleyball | No Top Three Finish | | Gold: Tri-County Girls | Gold: Tri-County Girls; Bronze: ASAA North Central Zone Sr. Girls | Season Upcoming |
| Basketball | No Top Three Finish | Gold: Tri-County Sr. Boys | No Top Three Finish | Gold: Tri-County Sr. Girls; Gold: ASAA North Central Zone Sr. Girls; Bronze: Tri-County Sr. Boys | Gold: Tri-County Sr. Girls; Gold: Tri-County Sr. Boys; Silver: ASAA North Central Zone Sr. Girls |
| Badminton | No Top Three Finish | Gold: Tri-County All-Around | No Top Three Finish | | Season Upcoming |
| Golf | No Top Three Finish | | Gold: North Central Zone 1A Ind. Girls | No Top Three Finish | Season Upcoming |
| Track and Field | No Top Three Finish | | Gold: Grade 9 Point Champions | No Top Three Finish | Season Upcoming |

Medals by sport
| Sport | gold | silver | bronze | Total |
| Volleyball | 2 | 0 | 1 | 2 |
| Basketball | 5 | 1 | 1 | 7 |
| Badminton | 1 | 0 | 0 | 1 |
| Golf | 1 | 0 | 0 | 1 |
| Track and Field | 1 | 0 | 0 | 1 |
| Total | 10 | 1 | 2 | 13 |

Teams advance from Tri-County League to North Central Zones, then to ASAA Provincial Championships.
