= Whitecourt (provincial electoral district) =

Defunct provincial electoral district in Alberta, Canada

Alberta electoral district

Defunct provincial electoral district
- Legislature: Legislative Assembly of Alberta
- District created: 1971
- District abolished: 1993
- First contested: 1971
- Last contested: 1989

Whitecourt was a provincial electoral district in Alberta, Canada, mandated to return a single member to the Legislative Assembly of Alberta using first-past-the-post balloting from 1971 to 1993.

== Boundary history ==
Member of the Legislative Assembly for Whitecourt
Assembly	Years	Member	Party
See Lac Ste. Anne 1909–1971
17th	1971–1975	Peter Trynchy	Progressive; Conservative
18th	1975–1979	Peter Trynchy	Progressive; Conservative
19th	1979–1982	Peter Trynchy	Progressive; Conservative
20th	1982–1986	Peter Trynchy	Progressive; Conservative
21st	1986–1989	Peter Trynchy	Progressive; Conservative
22nd	1989–1993	Peter Trynchy	Progressive; Conservative
See Whitecourt-Ste. Anne 1993–2019

The district replaced Lac Ste. Anne for the 1971 election, with only minor boundary changes from the previous district. Its boundaries again remained mostly unchanged when replaced by Whitecourt-Ste. Anne in 1993, although the area around Fox Creek was transferred to Grande Prairie-Smoky.

== Representation history ==
The district's only MLA was Progressive Conservative Peter Trynchy. He entered the Legislature upon winning the seat in the 1971 election and served eight terms all together, six as MLA for Whitecourt and two in Whitecourt-Ste. Anne, finally retiring in 2001.

== Election results ==
=== 1970s ===
1971 Alberta general election
Party	Candidate	Votes	%
Progressive Conservative	Peter Trynchy	3,096	49.53%
Social Credit	Clyde Feero	2,125	33.99%
New Democratic	Robert Price	929	14.86%
Liberal	Arthur Yates	101	1.62%
Total valid votes		6,251	
Rejected, spoiled and declined		43	
Electors / Turnout		9,514	66.16%
Progressive Conservative pickup new district.			

1975 Alberta general election
Party	Candidate	Votes	%	±%
Progressive Conservative	Peter Trynchy	3,921	71.42%	+21.89%
New Democratic	John Udchitz	893	16.27%	+1.41%
Social Credit	Rig Godwin	676	12.31%	-21.68%
Total valid votes		5,490		
Rejected, spoiled and declined		21		
Electors / Turnout		8,683	63.47%	-2.69%
Progressive Conservative hold		Swing		+10.24%

1979 Alberta general election
Party	Candidate	Votes	%	±%
Progressive Conservative	Peter Trynchy	3,834	59.08%	-12.34%
New Democratic	Ken Forscutt	1,442	22.22%	+5.95%
Social Credit	George Richardson	1,214	18.71%	+6.40%
Total valid votes		6,490		
Rejected, spoiled and declined		162		
Electors / Turnout		10,488	63.42%	-0.05%
Progressive Conservative hold		Swing		-9.15%

=== 1980s ===
The 1982 election saw the rise of the separatist Western Canada Concept, which failed to win any seats. Their result in Whitecourt was the fourth-best in the province, despite Social Credit candidate George Richardson's status as party leader. Trynchy still won an outright majority of votes, benefitting from a surge in turnout.

1982 Alberta general election
Party	Candidate	Votes	%	±%
Progressive Conservative	Peter Trynchy	4,635	51.71%	-7.37%
Western Canada Concept	Andy Lee	2,276	25.39%	
New Democratic	Dick Davies	1,220	13.61%	-8.61%
Social Credit	George Richardson	685	7.64%	-11.07%
Liberal	John Powers	147	1.64%	
Total valid votes		8,963		
Rejected, spoiled and declined		44		
Electors / Turnout		12,441	72.40%	+8.98%
Progressive Conservative hold		Swing		-16.38%

1986 Alberta general election
Party	Candidate	Votes	%	±%
Progressive Conservative	Peter Trynchy	4,038	54.15%	+2.44%
Representative	Merv Zadderey	1,611	21.60%	+13.96%
New Democratic	Dick Davies	1,349	18.09%	+4.48%
Liberal	Rick Allen	459	6.16%	+4.52%
Total valid votes		7,457		
Rejected, spoiled and declined		11		
Electors / Turnout		13,254	56.35%	-16.05%
Progressive Conservative hold		Swing		-5.76%

Representative Party swing in 1986 is calculated from Social Credit results in 1982.

1989 Alberta general election
Party	Candidate	Votes	%	±%
Progressive Conservative	Peter Trynchy	3,877	49.93%	-4.22%
Liberal	Jurgen Preugschas	2,432	31.32%	+25.16%
New Democratic	Gwen Symington	1,456	18.75%	+0.66%
Total valid votes		7,765		
Rejected, spoiled and declined		33		
Electors / Turnout		13,795	56.53%	+0.18%
Progressive Conservative hold		Swing		-14.69%

== See also ==
- List of Alberta provincial electoral districts
- Canadian provincial electoral districts
