= Tom Thurber =

Canadian politician

Member of the Legislative Assembly of Alberta
- In office 1989–2001
- Preceded by: Shirley Cripps (Drayton Valley)
- Succeeded by: Tony Abbott (Drayton Valley-Calmar)
- Constituency: Drayton Valley (1989–1993); Drayton Valley-Calmar (1993–2001)

Personal details
- Born: October 26, 1934 Herronton, Alberta
- Died: March 7, 2010 (aged 75) Rimbey, Alberta
- Party: Progressive Conservative Association of Alberta
- Occupation: farmer

Thomas George Thurber (born 1934-2000) was a Canadian provincial politician. He was a member of the Legislative Assembly of Alberta (MLA) from 1989 to 2000. He served as Alberta's Minister of Public Affairs, Supply and Services from 1993 to 1994 and as Minister of Municipal Affairs from 1994-1997.

== Early life and career ==
Thurber was born in Herronton, Alberta on 26 October 1934. He served in the Korean War and later became a rancher in Winfield, Alberta, near Edmonton.

He served as reeve for Wetaskiwin County, member of a school board, member of a hospital board, and chair of the Alberta Cattle Commission before he ran for election to the Alberta Legislative Assembly in 1989.

== Political career ==
Thurber was first elected to the Alberta Legislature in the 1989 Alberta general election. He won the electoral district of Drayton Valley holding it for the Progressive Conservative Party by a wide margin.

The electorate of Drayton Valley was abolished in 1993 and reconstituted into Drayton Valley-Calmar. Thurber ran for re-election in the 1993 Alberta general election and won the new riding with an increased plurality. He ran for a third term in office in the 1997 Alberta general election winning the biggest margin of his career defeating three other candidates.

Thurber served as Alberta's Minister of Public Affairs, Supply and Services from 1993 to 1994 and as Minister of Municipal Affairs from 1994-1997. In July 1999, he was one of three Alberta MLAs to participate in the Partnership of Parliaments parliamentarian exchange program with Germany.

Thurber retired from public politics at dissolution of the legislature in 2001, saying "I did not want to make this a full-life career".

== Death ==
Thurber died on 7 March 2010 at Rimbey Hospital in Rimbey, Alberta; he was 75.
