= Lac Ste. Anne-Parkland =

Provincial electoral district in Alberta, Canada

Alberta electoral district
- Lac Ste. Anne-Parkland within Alberta (2017 boundaries)

Provincial electoral district
- Legislature: Legislative Assembly of Alberta
MLA
Vacant
- District created: 2017
- First contested: 2019
- Last contested: 2023

Demographics
- Population (2016): 46,546
- Area (km²): 5,486
- Pop. density (per km²): 8.5

Lac Ste. Anne-Parkland is a provincial electoral district in Alberta, Canada. The district is one of 87 districts mandated to return a single member (MLA) to the Legislative Assembly of Alberta using the first past the post method of voting. It was contested for the first time in the 2019 Alberta election.

== Geography ==
The district is located northwest of Edmonton, containing all of Lac Ste. Anne County and part of Parkland County, taking its name from the two municipal districts. It also contains a portion of Sturgeon County. It includes the Treaty 6 reserves of the Alexander First Nation, the Alexis Nakota Sioux First Nation, and the Paul Band at Wabamun Lake. The main towns and villages are Onoway, Wabamun, Alberta Beach and Mayerthorpe.

== History ==
The district was created in 2017 when the Electoral Boundaries Commission recommended joining most of Whitecourt-Ste. Anne with parts of Barrhead-Morinville-Westlock, Spruce Grove-St. Albert, and Stony Plain in an effort to remove one district from central-western Alberta.

== Members of the Legislative Assembly ==
Members for Lac Ste. Anne-Parkland
Assembly	Years	Member	Party
See Whitecourt-Ste. Anne 1993–2019
30th	2019–2023	Shane Getson	United Conservative
31st	2023–2026	Shane Getson	United Conservative
31st	2026–Present	Vacant	Vacant

== Electoral results ==
=== 2023 ===
2023 Alberta general election
Party	Candidate	Votes	%	±%
United Conservative	Shane Getson	14,923	68.96	+3.22
New Democratic	Oneil Carlier	5,868	27.12	+3.71
Alberta Party	Janet Jabush	463	2.14	-5.61
Green	Vanessa Diehl	205	0.95	–
Advantage Party	Marilyn Burns	182	0.84	-0.56
Total		21,641	99.61	–
Rejected and declined		85	0.39	
Turnout		21,726	61.27	
Eligible voters		35,460		
United Conservative hold		Swing		-0.25
Source(s) Source: Elections Alberta

=== 2019 ===
2019 Alberta general election
Party	Candidate	Votes	%	±%
United Conservative	Shane Getson	15,860	65.74%	8.38%
New Democratic	Oneil Carlier	5,646	23.40%	-16.09%
Alberta Party	Donald Walter McCargar	1,870	7.75%	–
Alberta Independence	Gordon W. McMillan	413	1.71%	–
Alberta Advantage	Darien Masse	337	1.40%	–
Total		24,126	–	–
Rejected, spoiled and declined		95	65	20
Eligible electors / turnout		33,510	72.34%	–
United Conservative pickup new district.				
Source(s) Source: "67 - Lac Ste. Anne-Parkland, 2019 Alberta general election". officialresults.elections.ab.ca. Elections Alberta. Alberta. Chief Electoral Officer (2019). 2019 General Election. A Report of the Chief Electoral Officer. Volume II (PDF) (Report). Vol. 2. Edmonton, Alta.: Elections Alberta. pp. 309–313. ISBN 978-1-988620-12-1.

=== 2015 ===
Redistributed results, 2015 Alberta general election
Party	Votes	%
New Democratic	7,775	39.49%
Wildrose	5,997	30.46%
Progressive Conservative	5,297	26.90%
Others	621	3.15%

== See also ==
- List of Alberta provincial electoral districts
- Canadian provincial electoral districts
