= Shirley Cripps =

Canadian politician

The Honourable Shirley A. Cripps ECA

MLA for Drayton Valley
- In office 1979–1989
- Preceded by: Rudolph Zander
- Succeeded by: Tom Thurber

Associate Minister of Agriculture
- In office May 1986 – March 1989
- Preceded by: New Position
- Succeeded by: Shirley McClellan

Personal details
- Born: Shirley Anne Cripps; September 11, 1935 (age 90) Westerose, Alberta
- Party: Progressive Conservative

Shirley Anne Cripps ECA (born September 11, 1935) was a provincial level politician from Alberta, Canada. She served as a member of the Legislative Assembly of Alberta from 1979 to 1989. During her time in the Alberta Legislature she served in the Executive Council of Alberta from 1986 to 1989.

== Political career ==
Cripps ran for a seat to the Alberta Legislature for the first time in the 1979 Alberta general election. She won the electoral district of Drayton Valley to hold it for the governing Progressive Conservative caucus. She was easily re-elected in the 1982 Alberta general election with a larger plurality defeating two other candidates. She was run for her third and final term in the 1986 Alberta general election. Cripps won the biggest margin of victory in her political career. After the election she was appointed Associate Minister of Agriculture by Premier Don Getty. She served that until her retirement at the dissolution of the Legislature in 1989.
