= Oneil Carlier =

Canadian politician (born 1962)

The Honourable Oneil Carlier ECA
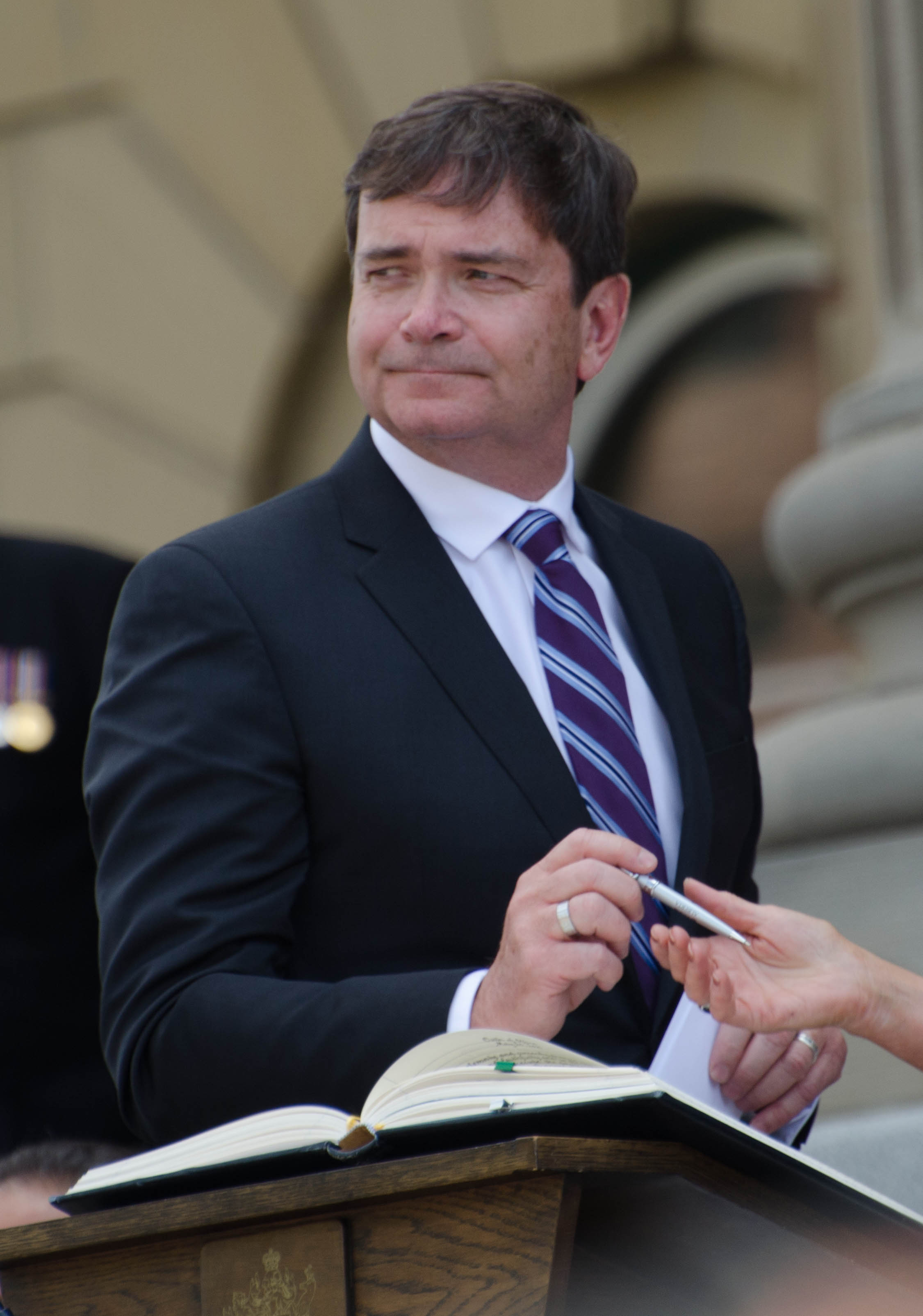
- Carlier in 2015

Minister of Agriculture and Forestry of Alberta
- In office May 24, 2015 – April 30, 2019
- Premier: Rachel Notley
- Preceded by: LeRoy Fjordbotten
- Succeeded by: Devin Dreeshen

Member of the Legislative Assembly of Alberta for Whitecourt-Ste. Anne
- In office May 5, 2015 – March 19, 2019
- Preceded by: George VanderBurg
- Succeeded by: Shane Getson

Personal details
- Born: June 22, 1962 (age 64) Val Marie, Saskatchewan
- Party: Alberta New Democratic Party
- Occupation: Politician
- Portfolio: Minister of Agriculture and Forestry

Oneil John Carlier ECA (born June 22, 1962) is a Canadian politician who was elected in the 2015 Alberta general election to the Legislative Assembly of Alberta representing the electoral district of Whitecourt-Ste. Anne, serving until April 30, 2019. He was Minister of Agriculture and Minister of Forestry in the Alberta Cabinet. He is from the community of Darwell, which is located within Lac Ste. Anne County.

== Electoral history ==
=== 2023 general election ===
2023 Alberta general election: Lac Ste. Anne-Parkland
| Party | Candidate | Votes | % | ±% |
|---|---|---|---|---|
| United Conservative | Shane Getson | 14,923 | 68.96 | +3.22 |
| New Democratic | Oneil Carlier | 5,868 | 27.12 | +3.71 |
| Alberta Party | Janet Jabush | 463 | 2.14 | -5.61 |
| Green | Vanessa Diehl | 205 | 0.95 | – |
| Advantage Party | Marilyn Burns | 182 | 0.84 | -0.56 |
| Total | | 21,641 | 99.61 | – |
| Rejected and declined | | 85 | 0.39 | |
| Turnout | | 21,726 | 61.27 | |
| Eligible voters | | 35,460 | | |
| United Conservative hold | | Swing | | -0.25 |
Source(s) Source: Elections Alberta

=== 2019 general election ===
2019 Alberta general election: Lac Ste. Anne-Parkland
| Party | Candidate | Votes | % | ±% |
|---|---|---|---|---|
| United Conservative | Shane Getson | 15,860 | 65.74% | 8.38% |
| New Democratic | Oneil Carlier | 5,646 | 23.40% | -16.09% |
| Alberta Party | Donald Walter McCargar | 1,870 | 7.75% | – |
| Alberta Independence | Gordon W. McMillan | 413 | 1.71% | – |
| Alberta Advantage | Darien Masse | 337 | 1.40% | – |
| Total | | 24,126 | – | – |
| Rejected, spoiled and declined | | 95 | 65 | 20 |
| Eligible electors / turnout | | 33,510 | 72.34% | – |
| United Conservative pickup new district. | | | | |
Source(s) Source: "67 - Lac Ste. Anne-Parkland, 2019 Alberta general election". officialresults.elections.ab.ca. Elections Alberta. Alberta. Chief Electoral Officer (2019). 2019 General Election. A Report of the Chief Electoral Officer. Volume II (PDF) (Report). Vol. 2. Edmonton, Alta.: Elections Alberta. pp. 309–313. ISBN 978-1-988620-12-1.

=== 2015 general election ===
2015 Alberta general election: Whitecourt-Ste. Anne
| Party | Candidate | Votes | % | ±% |
|---|---|---|---|---|
| New Democratic | Oneil Carlier | 5,442 | 35.90% | 30.44% |
| Wildrose | John Bos | 4,996 | 32.96% | -10.31% |
| Progressive Conservative | George Vanderburg | 4,721 | 31.14% | -14.77% |
| Total | | 15,159 | – | – |
| Rejected, spoiled and declined | | 79 | – | – |
| Eligible electors / turnout | | 28,345 | 53.76% | -0.46% |
| New Democratic gain from Progressive Conservative | | Swing | | 0.14% |
Source(s) Source: "Whitecourt-Ste. Anne Official Results 2015 Alberta general election". Elections Alberta.
