= Drayton Valley-Devon =

Provincial electoral district in Alberta, Canada

Alberta electoral district
- Drayton Valley-Devon within Alberta, 2017 boundaries

Provincial electoral district
- Legislature: Legislative Assembly of Alberta
MLA
Andrew Boitchenko
United Conservative
- District created: 2010
- First contested: 2012
- Last contested: 2023

Drayton Valley-Devon is a provincial electoral district in Alberta, Canada. The district was created in the 2010 boundary redistribution and is mandated to return a single member to the Legislative Assembly of Alberta using the first past the post voting system. Drayton Valley-Devon is currently represented by United Conservative Party MLA Andrew Boitchenko. Prior to 2023, the district was represented by Mark Smith who was first elected in 2015.

== History ==
The electoral district was created in the 2010 Alberta boundary re-distribution. It was created from the old electoral district of Drayton Valley-Calmar which was expanded east into land that was part of the Leduc-Beaumont-Devon riding to include the town of Devon

=== Boundary history ===
56 Drayton Valley-Devon 2010 boundaries
Bordering districts
North	East	West	South
Stony Plain and Whitecourt-Ste. Anne	Leduc-Beaumont and Wetaskiwin-Camrose	West Yellowhead	Lacombe-Panoka and Rimbey-Rocky Mountain House-Sundre
Legal description from the Statutes of Alberta 2010, Electoral Divisions Act

Members of the Legislative Assembly for Drayton Valley-Devon
Assembly	Years	Member	Party
Riding created from Drayton Valley-Calmar and Leduc-Beaumont-Devon
28th	2012-2015	Diana McQueen	Progressive Conservative
29th	2015–2017	Mark Smith	Wildrose
29th	2017-2019	Mark Smith	United Conservative
30th	2019–2023	Mark Smith	United Conservative
31st	2023–present	Andrew Boitchenko	United Conservative

=== Electoral history ===
Drayton Valley-Devon and its antecedent, Drayton Valley-Calmar, elected Progressive Conservative MLAs with solid majorities from the 1970s to 2015. Since 2015, it has elected two people, Mark Smith, who first ran for the Wildrose Party in 2015 and then for the United Conservatives in 2019, and Andrew Boitchenko, who ran for the United Conservatives in 2023.

The first MLA elected to Drayton Valley-Devon was Progressive Conservative Diana McQueen, who was a cabinet minister in the Allison Redford government. The incumbent is Andrew Boitchenko.

== Legislative election results ==
=== 2012 ===
2012 Alberta general election
Party	Candidate	Votes	%	±%
Progressive Conservative	Diana McQueen	7,359	51.65%	–
Wildrose	Dean Shular	5,467	38.37%	–
New Democratic	Doris Bannister	878	6.16%	–
Liberal	Chantel Lillycrop	544	3.82%	–
Total		14,248	–	–
Rejected, spoiled, and declined		56	–	–
Eligible electors / turnout		25,705	55.65%	–
Progressive Conservative pickup new district.				
Source(s) Source: "Elections Alberta 2012 General Election". Elections Alberta.

=== 2015 ===
2015 Alberta general election
Party	Candidate	Votes	%	±%
Wildrose	Mark Smith	6,284	37.02%	-1.35%
Progressive Conservative	Diana McQueen	5,182	30.53%	-21.12%
New Democratic	Katherine Swampy	4,816	28.37%	22.21%
Alberta Party	Connie Jensen	416	2.45%	–
Green	Jennifer R Roach	276	1.63%	–
Total		16,974	–	–
Rejected, spoiled and declined		34	–	–
Eligible electors / turnout		29,733	57.20%	1.56%
Wildrose gain from Progressive Conservative		Swing		-3.39%
Source(s) Source: "Elections Alberta 2015 General Election". Elections Alberta.

2015 Alberta general election redistributed results
Party	Votes	%
Wildrose	7,168	36.35
New Democratic	5,894	29.89
Progressive Conservative	5,658	28.69
Alberta Party	453	2.30
Green	283	1.44
Liberal	262	1.33
Source(s) Source: Ridingbuilder

=== 2019 ===
2019 Alberta general election
Party	Candidate	Votes	%	±%
United Conservative	Mark Smith	18,092	71.12	+6.08†
New Democratic	Kieran Quirke	4,233	16.64	-13.25
Alberta Party	Gail Upton	1,634	6.42	+4.13
Freedom Conservative	Steve Goodman	624	2.45	–
Alberta Advantage	Mark Gregor	298	1.17	–
Alberta Independence	Les Marks	233	0.92	–
Liberal	Ronald Brochu	217	0.85	-0.48
Independent	Carol Nordlund-Kinsey	106	0.42	–
Total		25,437	99.14	–
Rejected, spoiled and declined		220	0.86	–
Turnout		25,657	74.25	
Eligible voters		34,554		
United Conservative notional hold		Swing		+9.66
Source(s) Source: "2019 Election Results - 58 - Drayton Valley-Devon". officialresults.elections.ab.ca. Elections Alberta. †From combined Wildrose and Progressive Conservative redistributed results in the 2015 general election

=== 2023 ===
2023 Alberta general election
Party	Candidate	Votes	%	±%
United Conservative	Andrew Boitchenko	16,532	73.70	+2.58
New Democratic	Harry Singh	5,009	22.33	+5.69
Wildrose Loyalty Coalition	Jon Hokanson	580	2.59	–
Advantage Party	Dale Withers	189	0.84	-0.33
Solidarity Movement	Gail Tookey	121	0.54	–
Total		22,431	99.42	–
Rejected and declined		131	0.58	
Turnout		22,562	61.90	
Eligible voters		36,448		
United Conservative hold		Swing		-1.56
Source(s) Source: Elections Alberta

== Nomination contests ==
UCP Drayton Valley-Devon nomination contest: December 2-3, 2022

Candidate	Round 1		Round 2	
Candidate	Votes	%	Votes	%
Andrew Boitchenko	329	44.8	356	50.7
Carol Vowk	313	42.6	346	49.3
Kara Westerlund	93	12.7	Eliminated	
Total	735	100.0	702	100.0

== Referendum results ==
2026 Alberta referendum
Side	Votes	%
Remain	14,052	54.66
Referendum	11,658	45.34

== Student vote results ==
=== 2012 election ===
==== Registered schools ====
Please note: Only schools registered under Drayton Valley-Devon have been included, as some schools within jurisdiction are registered in other ridings.

Calmar
- New Humble Centre School
- Calmar Secondary School

Devon

- Riverview Middle School
- John Maland High School
- Devon Christian School

Drayton Valley

- Aurora Elementary School
- Drayton Christian School
- H.W. Pickup Junior High School
- Holy Trinity Academy
- St. Anthony School

Falun

- Falun School

Pigeon Lake

- Pigeon Lake Regional School

Thorsby

- Thorsby Elementary School
- Thorsby Junior/Senior High School

Warburg

- Warburg School

Winfield

- Winfield School

==== Results ====
2012 Alberta student vote results
Affiliation	Candidate	Votes	%
Progressive Conservative	Diana McQueen	579	43.05%
Wildrose	Dean Shular	367	27.29%
Liberal	Chantel Lillycrop	253	18.81%
NDP	Doris Bannister	146	10.86%
Total		1345	100%

== See also ==
- List of Alberta provincial electoral districts
- Canadian provincial electoral districts
