= Rudolph Zander =

Canadian politician from Alberta (1915–1996)

MLA for Drayton Valley
- In office 1971–1979
- Succeeded by: Shirley Cripps

Personal details
- Born: July 21, 1915 Tomahawk, Alberta
- Died: October 4, 1996 (aged 81) Alberta, Canada
- Party: Progressive Conservative Association of Alberta
- Children: three
- Occupation: farmer

Rudolph "Rusty" Zander (July 21, 1915 – October 4, 1996) was a politician from Alberta, Canada.

Zander ran in the 1963 Alberta general election under the Alberta Unity Movement banner in the electoral district of Stony Plain, but was easily defeated by longtime Social Credit incumbent Cornelia Wood, coming in 4th. He would run again in the 1971 Alberta general election, this time as a Progressive Conservative in the new electoral district of Drayton Valley. He won the election with a comfortable margin over the Social Credit candidate. In the 1975 Alberta general election, he would steam roll over his opponents to win a second term in office. He did not reoffer in the 1979 Alberta general election.
