= Shane Getson =

Canadian politician (born 1973/74)

Shane Getson MLA
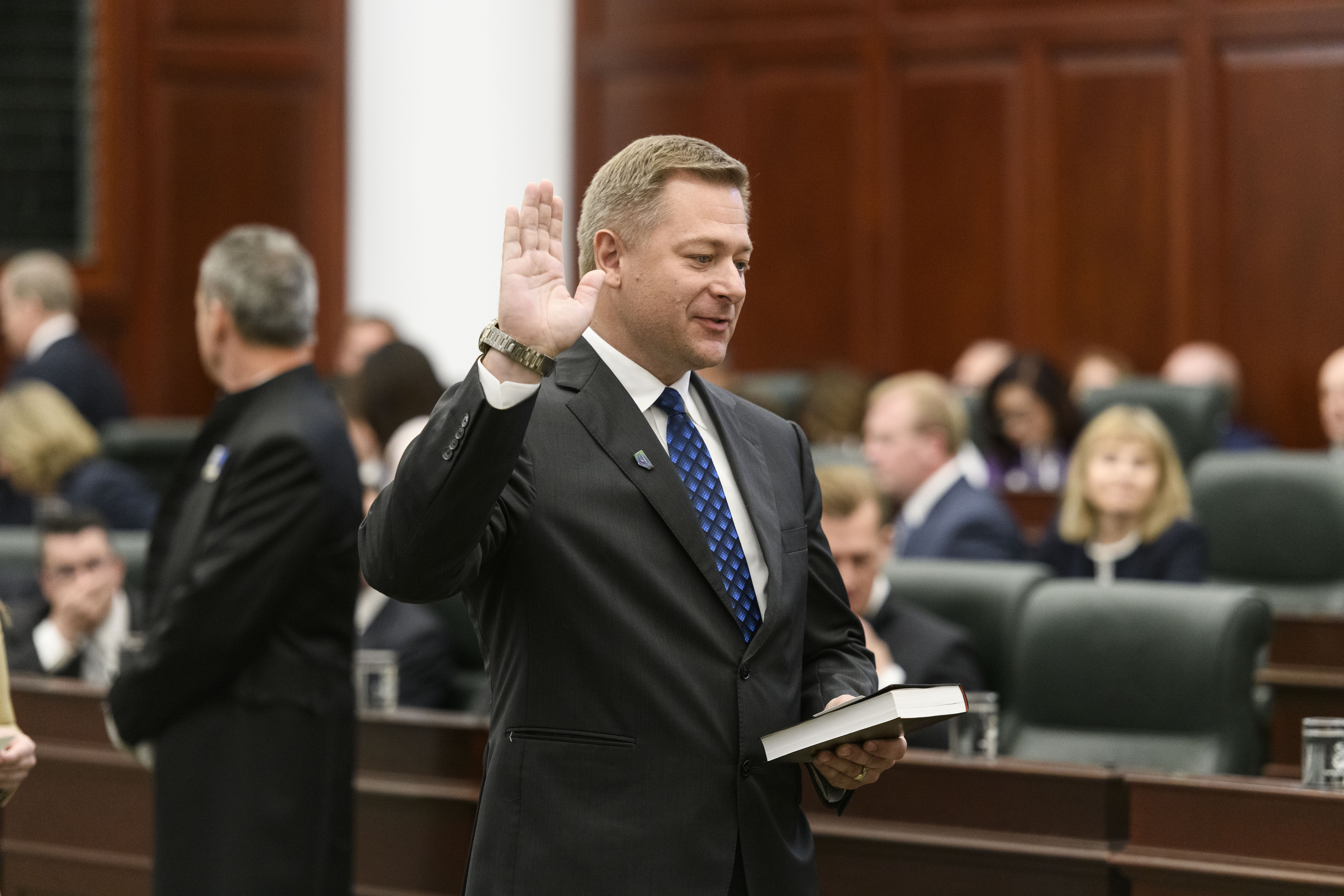
- Getson being sworn in to the Legislative Assembly in 2019

Member of the Legislative Assembly of Alberta for Lac Ste. Anne-Parkland
- In office April 16, 2019 – October 26, 2026
- Preceded by: Oneil Carlier
- Succeeded by: Vacant

Personal details
- Born: 1973 or 1974 (age 52–53)
- Party: United Conservative Party
- Occupation: Civil engineering technologist

Shane Getson is a Canadian politician who represented the riding of Lac Ste. Anne-Parkland in the Legislative Assembly of Alberta from 2019 until 2026. A member of the United Conservative Party, Getson was first elected in the 2019 Alberta general election and subsequently re-elected in the 2023 election.

== Personal life and education ==
Prior to serving with the Legislative Assembly, he owned and operated a consulting company serving the construction and energy sectors with a focus on linear infrastructure.

He attended the Northern Alberta Institute of Technology (NAIT), where he received a diploma in Civil Engineering Technology in 1996.

He and his wife have four children.

Getson is a private pilot and aircraft owner.

== Career ==
Getson was the 917th Member to be sworn into the Legislative Assembly of Alberta.

In September 2021, Getson criticized Alberta Health Services and their executives for not increasing capacity to handle the fourth wave of the COVID-19 pandemic. He said that the policy of vaccine passport was a distraction to keep accountability off of AHS. The timing of his comments was criticized by the opposition Alberta New Democratic Party as being "ignorant and tone deaf", saying that the governing UCP were responsible for the capacity issues. The comments were also criticized by healthcare workers on social media, which prompted Getson to apologize, stating that he made the comments "in context of the management of the organization, and its processes, not the personnel that operate [these] stations".

In January 2022, Getson faced criticism and calls by the opposition for his removal from caucus after fellow UCP MLA Grant Hunter attended a convoy protest that blockaded the Sweetgrass–Coutts Border Crossing, while Getson drove his gravel truck in the local Edmonton protest.

On October 26, 2026, Getson resigned as a member of the Legislative Assembly of Alberta, just over a week after the 2026 Alberta independence referendum.

== Electoral history ==
2023 Alberta general election: Lac Ste. Anne-Parkland
Party	Candidate	Votes	%	±%
United Conservative	Shane Getson	14,923	68.96	+3.22
New Democratic	Oneil Carlier	5,868	27.12	+3.71
Alberta Party	Janet Jabush	463	2.14	-5.61
Green	Vanessa Diehl	205	0.95	–
Advantage Party	Marilyn Burns	182	0.84	-0.56
Total		21,641	99.61	–
Rejected and declined		85	0.39	
Turnout		21,726	61.27	
Eligible voters		35,460		
United Conservative hold		Swing		-0.25
Source(s) Source: Elections Alberta

2019 Alberta general election: Lac Ste. Anne-Parkland
Party	Candidate	Votes	%	±%
United Conservative	Shane Getson	15,860	65.74%	8.38%
New Democratic	Oneil Carlier	5,646	23.40%	-16.09%
Alberta Party	Donald Walter McCargar	1,870	7.75%	–
Alberta Independence	Gordon W. McMillan	413	1.71%	–
Alberta Advantage	Darien Masse	337	1.40%	–
Total		24,126	–	–
Rejected, spoiled and declined		95	65	20
Eligible electors / turnout		33,510	72.34%	–
United Conservative pickup new district.				
Source(s) Source: "67 - Lac Ste. Anne-Parkland, 2019 Alberta general election". officialresults.elections.ab.ca. Elections Alberta. Alberta. Chief Electoral Officer (2019). 2019 General Election. A Report of the Chief Electoral Officer. Volume II (PDF) (Report). Vol. 2. Edmonton, Alta.: Elections Alberta. pp. 309–313. ISBN 978-1-988620-12-1.
