= Drayton Valley-Calmar =

Defunct provincial electoral district in Alberta, Canada

Alberta electoral district
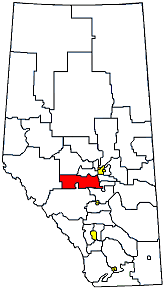
- 2004 boundaries

Provincial electoral district
- Legislature: Legislative Assembly of Alberta
- District created: 1993
- District abolished: 2010
- First contested: 1993
- Last contested: 2008

Drayton Valley-Calmar was a provincial electoral district in Alberta, Canada, mandated to return a single member to the Legislative Assembly of Alberta using the first-past-the-post method of voting from 1993 to 2012.

It elected a Progressive-Conservative MLA in each election from the 1990s to 2012.

== Drayton Valley-Calmar history ==
=== Boundary history ===
51 Drayton Valley-Calmar 2003 boundaries
Bordering districts
North	East	West	South
Whitecourt-Ste. Anne, Stony Plain	Leduc-Beaumont-Devon, Wetaskiwin-Camrose	West Yellowhead	Rocky Mountain House, Lacombe-Ponoka
riding map goes here		map in relation to other districts in Alberta goes here	
Legal description from the Electoral Divisions Act, S.A. 2003, c. E-4.1
Starting at the intersection of the east boundary of Rge. 16 W5 and the north boundary of Twp. 50; then 1. east along the north boundary of Twp. 50 to the east boundary of Rge. 7 W5; 2. south along the east boundary to the north boundary of Sec. 30, Twp. 50, Rge. 6 W5; 3. east along the north boundary to the east boundary of Sec. 30; 4. south along the east boundary to the north boundary of Sec. 20 in the Twp.; 5. east along the north boundary of Secs. 20 and 21 to the east boundary of Sec. 21 in the Twp.; 6. south along the east boundary to the right bank of the North Saskatchewan River; 7. downstream along the right bank to the west Devon town boundary; 8. south, east, south and east along the Devon town boundary to the intersection with Highway 60; 9. south along Highway 60 to the intersection with Highway 39; 10. east along Highway 39 to the east boundary of Rge. 26 W4; 11. south along the east boundary to the north boundary of Twp. 47; 12. east along the north boundary of Twp. 47 to the centre line of Highway 2; 13. south along the centre line of Highway 2 to the north boundary of Sec. 25, Twp. 45, Rge. 26 W4; 14. east along the north boundary of Sec. 25, Twp. 45, Rge. 26 and the north boundary of Sec. 30, Twp. 45, Rge. 25 W4 to the north boundary of the Louis Bull Indian Reserve No. 138B; 15. east along the Louis Bull Indian Reserve No. 138B to the west boundary of the Ermineskin Indian Reserve No. 138; 16. north, east, south, east, south, west and north along the boundary of Indian Reserve No. 138 to the north boundary of Twp. 44; 17. west along the north boundary of Twp. 44 to the east boundary of Sec. 3 in Twp. 45, Rge. 1 W5; 18. north along the east boundary of Sec. 3 to the north boundary of Sec. 3; 19. west along the north boundary of Sec. 3 to the east boundary of the west half of Sec. 10; 20. north along the east boundary of the west half of Sec. 10 to the north boundary of the south half of Sec. 10; 21. west along the north boundary of the south half of Secs. 10 and 9 to the east boundary of Sec. 8 in Twp. 45, Rge. 1 W5; 22. north along the east boundary of Sec. 8 to the north boundary of Sec. 8; 23. west along the north boundary of Secs. 8 and 7 to the east boundary of Rge. 2; 24. north along the east boundary of Rge. 2 to the north boundary of Sec. 13; 25. west along the north boundary of Secs. 13, 14, 15, 16, 17 and 18 in Rges. 2 and 3 and the north boundary of Secs. 13, 14, 15 and 16 to the east boundary of Sec. 17 in the Twp.; 26. south along the east boundary of Secs. 17, 8 and 5 in the Twp. to the north boundary of Twp. 44; 27. west along the north boundary to the east boundary of Rge. 8 W5; 28. north along the east boundary to the right bank of the North Saskatchewan River; 29. upstream along the right bank to the north boundary of Twp. 44; 30. west along the north boundary to the east boundary of O’Chiese Indian Reserve No. 203; 31. north, west and south along the boundary to the north boundary of Twp. 44; 32. west along the north boundary to the east boundary of Rge. 15 W5; 33. north along the east boundary to the north boundary of Twp. 47; 34. west along the north boundary to the east boundary of Rge. 16 W5; 35. north along the east boundary to the starting point.

=== Members of the Legislative Assembly (MLAs) ===
Members of the Legislative Assembly for Drayton Valley-Calmar
Assembly	Years	Member	Party
See Drayton Valley electoral district from 1971-1993
23rd	1993–1997	Tom Thurber	Progressive Conservative
24th	1997–2001	Tom Thurber	Progressive Conservative
25th	2001–2004	Tony Abbott	Progressive Conservative
26th	2004–2008	Tony Abbott	Progressive Conservative
27th	2008–2012	Diana McQueen	Progressive Conservative
See Drayton Valley-Devon electoral district from 2012-Present

== Legislative election results ==
=== 1993 ===
1993 Alberta general election
Party	Candidate	Votes	%	±%
Progressive Conservative	Tom Thurber	5,261	51.07%	–
Liberal	Brad Janishewski	3,001	29.13%	–
Social Credit	Ed White	1,133	11.00%	–
New Democratic	Dolly Brown	768	7.46%	–
Natural Law	Keith Burger	138	1.34%	–
Total		10,301	–	–
Rejected, spoiled and declined		18	–	–
Eligible electors / turnout		16,940	60.91%	–
Progressive Conservative pickup new district.				
Source(s) Source: "Drayton Valley-Calmar Official Results 1993 Alberta general election". Alberta Heritage Community Foundation.

=== 1997 ===
1997 Alberta general election
Party	Candidate	Votes	%	±%
Progressive Conservative	Tom Thurber	6,492	60.59%	9.52%
Liberal	Moe Hamdon	2,912	27.18%	-1.96%
New Democratic	Tom Fuller	823	7.68%	0.23%
Independent	Roy Andresen	488	4.55%	–
Total		10,715	–	–
Rejected, spoiled and declined		32	–	–
Eligible electors / turnout		17,356	61.92%	1.01%
Progressive Conservative hold		Swing		5.74%
Source(s) Source: "Drayton Valley-Calmar Official Results 1997 Alberta general election". Alberta Heritage Community Foundation.

=== 2001 ===
2001 Alberta general election
Party	Candidate	Votes	%	±%
Progressive Conservative	Tony Abbott	7,673	68.39%	7.80%
Liberal	Roger Coles	2,229	19.87%	-7.31%
Independent	Roger Stefura	729	6.50%	1.94%
New Democratic	Mark Patty	588	5.24%	-2.44%
Total		11,219	–	–
Rejected, spoiled, and declined		17	–	–
Eligible electors / turnout		18,416	61.01%	-0.91%
Progressive Conservative hold		Swing		7.56%
Source(s) Source: "Drayton Valley-Calmar Official Results 2001 Alberta general election". Alberta Heritage Community Foundation.

=== 2004 ===
2004 Alberta general election
Party	Candidate	Votes	%	±%
Progressive Conservative	Tony Abbott	5,225	59.30%	-9.09%
Greens	Edwin Erickson	929	10.54%	–
Liberal	Laura Higgerty	890	10.10%	-9.77%
Alberta Alliance	Viona Cunningham	766	8.69%	–
New Democratic	Lynn Oberle	642	7.29%	2.05%
Social Credit	Thomas Cliff	243	2.76%	–
Independent	Elmer Knopp	116	1.32%	–
Total		8,811	–	–
Rejected, spoiled and declined		49	–	–
Eligible electors / turnout		19,214	46.11%	-14.90%
Progressive Conservative hold		Swing		0.12%
Source(s) Source: "Drayton Valley-Calmar Official Results 2004 Alberta general election". Alberta Heritage Community Foundation.

=== 2008 ===
2008 Alberta general election
Party	Candidate	Votes	%	±%
Progressive Conservative	Diana McQueen	5,931	58.74%	-0.56%
Green	Edwin Erickson	1,877	18.59%	–
Wildrose	Dean Schmale	1,053	10.43%	–
Liberal	Norma Block	846	8.38%	-1.72%
New Democratic	Luann Bannister	390	3.86%	-3.42%
Total		10,097	–	–
Rejected, spoiled and declined		31	–	–
Eligible electors / turnout		20,923	48.41%	2.29%
Progressive Conservative hold		Swing		-4.30%
Source(s) Source: "Elections Alberta 2008 General Election". Elections Alberta.

== Senate nominee election results ==
=== 2004 ===
2004 Senate nominee election results: Drayton Valley-Calmar				Turnout 46.15%	
Affiliation	Candidate	Votes	% votes	% ballots	Rank
Progressive Conservative	Cliff Breitkreuz	4,602	19.36%	58.51%	3
Progressive Conservative	Bert Brown	3,362	14.14%	42.74%	1
Progressive Conservative	Betty Unger	3,267	13.74%	42.81%	2
Independent	Link Byfield	2,446	10.29%	31.10%	4
Progressive Conservative	Jim Silye	1,913	8.05%	24.32%	5
Progressive Conservative	David Usherwood	1,913	8.05%	24.32%	6
Alberta Alliance	Michael Roth	1,776	7.47%	22.58%	7
Alberta Alliance	Gary Horan	1,658	6.97%	21.08%	10
Alberta Alliance	Vance Gough	1,645	6.92%	20.92%	8
Independent	Tom Sindlinger	1,194	5.01%	15.18%	9
Total votes		23,776	100%		
Total ballots		7,866	3.02 votes per ballot		
Rejected, spoiled and declined		1,002			

Voters had the option of selecting four candidates on the ballot

== 2004 student vote results ==
Participating schools
Alder Flats Elementary
Breton High School
Buck Mountain Central School
Eldorado School
Falun School
H.W. Pickup Junior High School
Lakedell School
Pigeon Lake Regional School
Pikestone School
Winfield Elementary School

On November 19, 2004, a student vote was conducted at participating Alberta schools to parallel the 2004 Alberta general election results. The vote was designed to educate students and simulate the electoral process for persons who have not yet reached the legal majority. The vote was conducted in 80 of the 83 provincial electoral districts with students voting for actual election candidates. Schools with a large student body that reside in another electoral district had the option to vote for candidates outside of the electoral district then where they were physically located.

2004 Alberta student vote results
Affiliation	Candidate	Votes	%
Progressive Conservative	Tony Abbott	396	39.56%
Green	Edwin Erickson	278	27.77%
Liberal	Laura Higgerty	153	15.28%
NDP	Lynn Oberle	53	5.29%
Alberta Alliance	Viona Cunningham	52	5.20%
Independent	Elmer Knopp	37	3.70%
Social Credit	Thomas Cliff	32	3.20%
Total		1,001	100%
Rejected, spoiled and declined		27	

== See also ==
- List of Alberta provincial electoral districts
- Canadian provincial electoral districts
