= Diana McQueen =

Canadian politician

The Honourable Diana McQueen ECA

Member of the Legislative Assembly Drayton Valley-Calmar
- In office March 3, 2008 – May 5, 2015
- Preceded by: Tony Abbott
- Succeeded by: Mark Smith

Minister of Municipal Affairs
- In office September 15, 2014 – May 23, 2015
- Premier: Jim Prentice
- Preceded by: Ken Hughes
- Succeeded by: Deron Bilous

Minister of Energy
- In office December 13, 2013 – September 14, 2014
- Premier: Alison Redford
- Preceded by: Ken Hughes
- Succeeded by: Frank Oberle Jr.

Minister of Environment and Sustainable Resource Development
- In office May 8, 2012 – December 12, 2013
- Premier: Alison Redford
- Preceded by: Herself (Minister of Environment and Water)
- Succeeded by: Robin Campbell

Minister of Environment and Water
- In office October 12, 2011 – May 7, 2012
- Premier: Alison Redford
- Preceded by: Rob Renner
- Succeeded by: Herself (Minister of Environment and Sustainable Resource Development)

Mayor Drayton Valley, Alberta
- In office October 18, 2004 – March 3, 2008
- Preceded by: Moe Hamdon
- Succeeded by: Moe Hamdon

Personal details
- Born: June 7, 1961 (age 65) Drayton Valley, Alberta
- Party: Progressive Conservative 2007-present
- Children: Jacqueline; Kristen; Melissa; Courtney
- Website: Party Website

Diana Janet McQueen ECA (born June 7, 1961) is a Canadian politician, who was elected in the 2008 provincial election to represent the electoral district of Drayton Valley-Calmar in the Legislative Assembly of Alberta as a member of the Progressive Conservative caucus. She served in several cabinet positions from 2011 to 2015.

After Alison Redford won the 2011 Progressive Conservative Leadership Convention, McQueen was sworn in during the final session of the 27th Alberta Legislative Assembly as the Alberta Minister of Environment and Water. The Ministry of Environment and Water (Alberta) was created to consolidate the Ministry of Environment & Water and the Ministry of Sustainable Resource Development announced on May 8, 2012. In December 2013, she was moved from the environment portfolio and became Minister of Energy. When Jim Prentice became premier in September 2014, McQueen was appointed Minister of Municipal Affairs; in March 2015 she was given the additional responsibility of being in charge of the province's response to climate change.

McQueen was defeated in the 2015 provincial election that also defeated Prentice's government.

Prior to standing in the provincial election, McQueen was mayor of Drayton Valley from 2001 to 2008.

== Electoral record ==
Municipal Elections
Drayton Valley mayoral election, 2007 results	Turnout 10.9%	
Candidate	Votes	%
McQUEEN, Diana (Incumbent)	Acclaimed	N/A
Drayton Valley mayoral election, 2004 results	Turnout Unk. %	
Candidate	Votes	%
McQUEEN, Diana	Unk.	Unk.

2008 Alberta general election: Drayton Valley-Calmar
Party	Candidate	Votes	%	±%
Progressive Conservative	Diana McQueen	5,931	58.74%	-0.56%
Green	Edwin Erickson	1,877	18.59%	–
Wildrose	Dean Schmale	1,053	10.43%	–
Liberal	Norma Block	846	8.38%	-1.72%
New Democratic	Luann Bannister	390	3.86%	-3.42%
Total		10,097	–	–
Rejected, spoiled and declined		31	–	–
Eligible electors / turnout		20,923	48.41%	2.29%
Progressive Conservative hold		Swing		-4.30%
Source(s) Source: "Elections Alberta 2008 General Election". Elections Alberta.

2012 Alberta general election: Drayton Valley-Devon
Party	Candidate	Votes	%	±%
Progressive Conservative	Diana McQueen	7,359	51.65%	–
Wildrose	Dean Shular	5,467	38.37%	–
New Democratic	Doris Bannister	878	6.16%	–
Liberal	Chantel Lillycrop	544	3.82%	–
Total		14,248	–	–
Rejected, spoiled, and declined		56	–	–
Eligible electors / turnout		25,705	55.65%	–
Progressive Conservative pickup new district.				
Source(s) Source: "Elections Alberta 2012 General Election". Elections Alberta.

2015 Alberta general election: Drayton Valley-Devon
Party	Candidate	Votes	%	±%
Wildrose	Mark Smith	6,284	37.02%	-1.35%
Progressive Conservative	Diana McQueen	5,182	30.53%	-21.12%
New Democratic	Katherine Swampy	4,816	28.37%	22.21%
Alberta Party	Connie Jensen	416	2.45%	–
Green	Jennifer R Roach	276	1.63%	–
Total		16,974	–	–
Rejected, spoiled and declined		34	–	–
Eligible electors / turnout		29,733	57.20%	1.56%
Wildrose gain from Progressive Conservative		Swing		-3.39%
Source(s) Source: "Elections Alberta 2015 General Election". Elections Alberta.

Political offices
Preceded by	Parliamentary Assistant for Alberta Environment; Since 2008-2010	Succeeded by No Appointment
Preceded by	Parliamentary Assistant for Alberta Energy; 2010-2011	Succeeded by David Xiao
