= Peter Trynchy =

Canadian politician (1931–2022)

Member of the Legislative Assembly of Alberta for Whitecourt-Ste. Anne Whitecourt (1971–1993)
- In office August 30, 1971 – March 12, 2001
- Preceded by: Riding Established
- Succeeded by: George VanderBurg

Personal details
- Born: August 21, 1931 Rochfort Bridge, Alberta, Canada
- Died: November 21, 2022 (aged 91)
- Party: Progressive Conservative Association of Alberta
- Occupation: Businessman, farmer

Peter Trynchy (August 22, 1931 – November 21, 2022) was a Canadian businessman, farmer and long serving municipal and provincial level politician from Alberta. He served as a member of the Legislative Assembly of Alberta from 1971 until 2001. During his time in public office, Trynchy served many cabinet portfolios in the Alberta provincial government.

== Early life ==
Peter Trynchy was born on August 22, 1931, in the small town of Rochfort Bridge, Alberta. He grew up on a farm and was educated locally. Trynchy began his early political career serving for six years as a town councilor for Mayerthorpe, Alberta. He was also active in numerous local organizations such as the Mayerthorpe Masonic Lodge, K-40 Kinsmen Club and a member of the Royal Canadian Legion. He was active in the local business community serving as the, now former, President Mayerthorpe Chamber of Commerce.

== Provincial politics ==
Trynchy's political career moved up to the provincial level when he was elected to the Alberta Legislature in the 1971 Alberta general election. He won the new electoral district of Whitecourt, defeating three other candidates to pick up the district for the Progressive Conservatives. He won his second term in office in the 1975 Alberta general election, defeating two other candidates and increasing his plurality.

Trynchy won his third term in office with a small drop in his popular vote in the 1979 Alberta general election. In 1981 as Minister of Recreation and Parks, Trynchy gave an initial $100,000 grant plus $20,000 per year maintenance budget to the town of Hanna in central Alberta to develop park facilities at Fox Lake north of the town site. The Fox Lake Park was officially opened by Trynchy and Chinook MLA Henry Kroeger on July 26, 1984. Trynchy created controversy when it was made public he took part in a cabinet vote on annexation of land in which he had a financial interest.

Trynchy defended his actions, claiming the land was held in a blind trust, although he provided conflicting statements on whether he had been given information related to the land from the trustee. An inquiry was launched into speculative land deals surrounding the annexations led by Justice William Brennan, who sharply criticized Trynchy for his actions saying his "carelessness amounts to negligence" in Brennan's April 1982 report.

Trynchy was re-elected to his fourth term in the 1982 Alberta general election. He won the second largest plurality of his political, career defeating four other candidates. He would stand for a fifth term in office in the 1986 Alberta general election. His plurality saw a minor decline but he still won his district comfortably, defeating three other candidates. His bid for a sixth term resulted in his closest election since coming to office in 1971. He won just a little over half the popular vote in the 1989 Alberta general election. The race saw a strong challenge by Liberal candidate Jurgen Preugschas, but Trynchy still returned with a safe margin.

=== Controversial years ===
The Whitecourt electoral district was abolished due to redistribution in 1993. Trynchy ran in the new electoral district of Whitecourt-Ste. Anne. The election of 1993 would see Trynchy win the second highest popular vote of his career. The race saw strong challenge by Preugschas, who had doubled his popular vote from four years earlier. Three other candidates rounded out the field finishing well behind the two front runners. Trynchy was easily returned to his seventh term in office.

A year later, while serving in the Ralph Klein government as Minister of Transportation and Utilities, Trynchy was investigated by the Alberta Ethics Commissioner Robert Clark over possible violations of the Conflict of Interest Act. The allegations were brought to the attention of the Ethics Commissioner by Calgary North West MLA Frank Bruseker. Clark investigated him for tendering a contract to resurface Alberta Highway 22 to Sandstar Corporation at the same time the company paved his driveway at his private residence. The opposition Liberal caucus brought the subject up in question period on October 25, 1994, and used the subject repeatedly in question period until November 7, 1994. Fort McMurray MLA Adam Germain was the first member to bring up a question regarding Sandstar paving his driveway on November 1, 1994. Clark found that the payment for the driveway on the Trynchy residence was only made after the opposition made the contract and driveway paving public. Questions were raised by the Clark as to whether Trynchy had intended to accept the paving as a gift for awarding the contract. He concluded after a lengthy investigation that there was no evidence Trynchy had attempted to influence the tender process and was cleared in the investigation.

Trynchy was involved in another controversy in April 1996 after granting a $150,000 to a senior's centre just before a by-election held in the Redwater electoral district. The local newspaper ran a photo of Trynchy and Vegreville-Viking MLA Ed Stelmach handing over the money a week before the election. The opposition accused the Progressive Conservatives of vote buying. The opposition Liberals held that seat in the by-election.

=== Final term ===
Trynchy stood for his eighth and final term in office in the 1997 Alberta general election. He won his final election with the largest plurality and popular vote of his political career. He retired from public politics at the dissolution of the Legislature in 2001. In total he spent 30 consecutive years in the legislature, making him by far the longest-serving of the original 1971 Progressive Conservative caucus.

== Late life and legacy ==
In honor of Peter Trynchy, the Mayerthorpe Area Community Foundation founded a scholarship and made it available to students living in the boundaries of the Whitecourt-Ste. Anne electoral district who wish to continue their technical and trades education. He died on November 21, 2022, at the age of 91.
