= Mark Smith (Canadian politician) =

Canadian politician

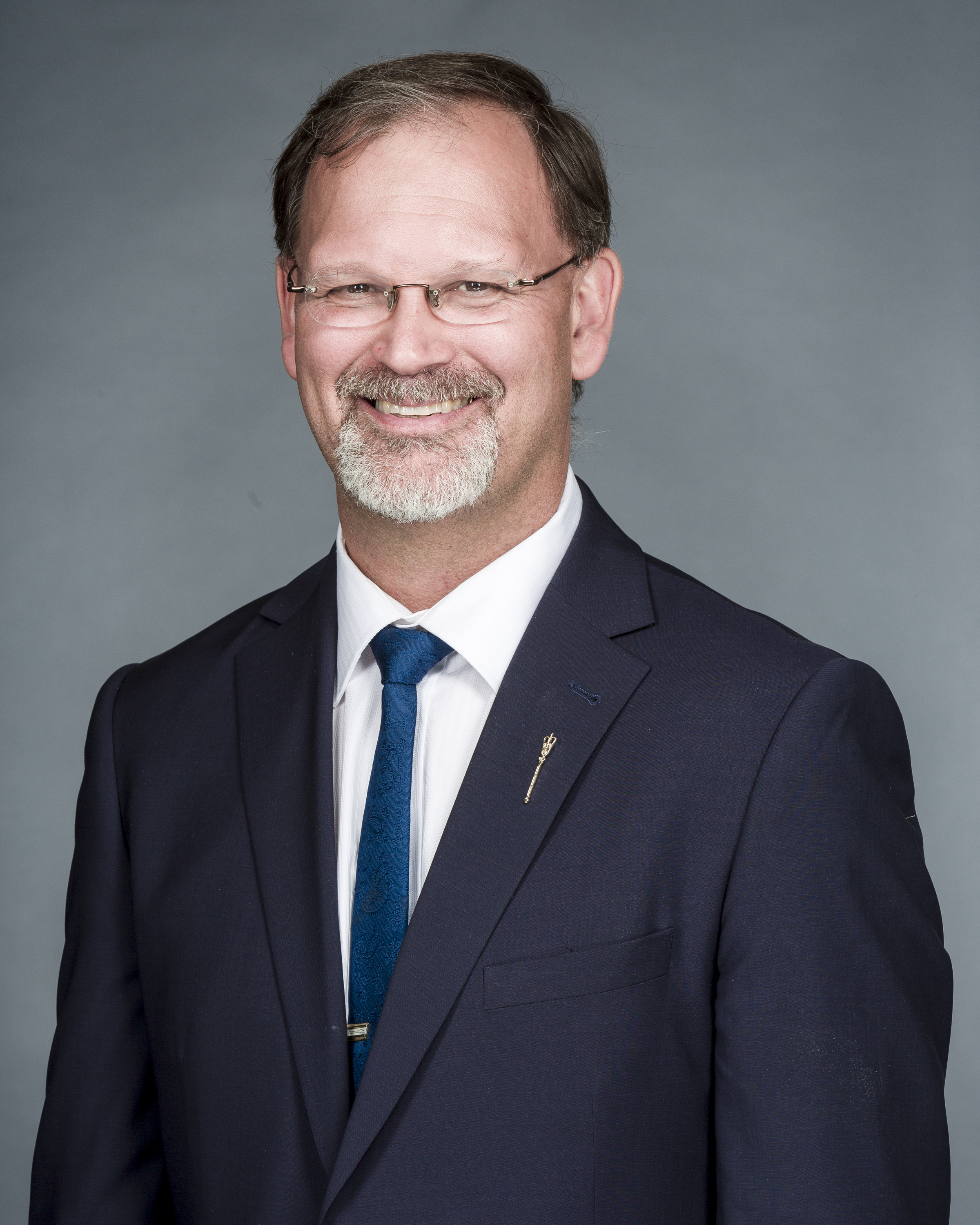

Member of the Legislative Assembly of Alberta for Drayton Valley-Devon
- In office May 5, 2015 – May 29, 2023
- Preceded by: Diana McQueen
- Succeeded by: Andrew Boitchenko

Personal details
- Born: 1960 (age 65–66) Moose Jaw, Saskatchewan, Canada
- Party: United Conservative
- Other political affiliations: Wildrose (2015–2017)
- Occupation: Teacher

Mark Smith (born 1960) is a Canadian politician. He was elected in the 2015 Alberta general election to the Legislative Assembly of Alberta, representing the electoral district of Drayton Valley-Devon.

Prior to the 2019 Alberta general election, Smith came under fire for apparent homophobic comments made in a 2013 sermon.

Smith stood down at the 2023 Alberta general election. His seat was retained by Andrew Boitchenko of the UCP.

== Electoral history ==
=== 2019 general election ===
2019 Alberta general election: Drayton Valley-Devon
Party	Candidate	Votes	%	±%
United Conservative	Mark Smith	18,092	71.12	+6.08†
New Democratic	Kieran Quirke	4,233	16.64	-13.25
Alberta Party	Gail Upton	1,634	6.42	+4.13
Freedom Conservative	Steve Goodman	624	2.45	–
Alberta Advantage	Mark Gregor	298	1.17	–
Alberta Independence	Les Marks	233	0.92	–
Liberal	Ronald Brochu	217	0.85	-0.48
Independent	Carol Nordlund-Kinsey	106	0.42	–
Total		25,437	99.14	–
Rejected, spoiled and declined		220	0.86	–
Turnout		25,657	74.25	
Eligible voters		34,554		
United Conservative notional hold		Swing		+9.66
Source(s) Source: "2019 Election Results - 58 - Drayton Valley-Devon". officialresults.elections.ab.ca. Elections Alberta. †From combined Wildrose and Progressive Conservative redistributed results in the 2015 general election

=== 2015 general election ===
2015 Alberta general election: Drayton Valley-Devon
Party	Candidate	Votes	%	±%
Wildrose	Mark Smith	6,284	37.02%	-1.35%
Progressive Conservative	Diana McQueen	5,182	30.53%	-21.12%
New Democratic	Katherine Swampy	4,816	28.37%	22.21%
Alberta Party	Connie Jensen	416	2.45%	–
Green	Jennifer R Roach	276	1.63%	–
Total		16,974	–	–
Rejected, spoiled and declined		34	–	–
Eligible electors / turnout		29,733	57.20%	1.56%
Wildrose gain from Progressive Conservative		Swing		-3.39%
Source(s) Source: "Elections Alberta 2015 General Election". Elections Alberta.
