= George VanderBurg =

Canadian politician (born 1957)

MLA for Whitecourt-Ste. Anne
- In office March 12, 2001 – May 5, 2015
- Preceded by: Peter Trynchy
- Succeeded by: Oneil Carlier

Personal details
- Born: February 15, 1957 (age 69) Edson, Alberta
- Party: Progressive Conservative
- Occupation: former business owner, mayor, and town councillor

George VanderBurg (born February 15, 1957) is a Canadian politician, who formerly represented the electoral district of Whitecourt-Ste. Anne in the Legislative Assembly of Alberta. He was a member of the Progressive Conservative Party.

VanderBurg won his third term in office by defeating Link Byfield in the 2008 Alberta general election. He served as Minister of Seniors and Community Supports in the Alberta government, appointed in 2011, succeeding Mary Anne Jablonski. Vanderburg lost his seat in May 2015 to NDP candidate, Oneil Carlier.

== Electoral history ==
2015 Alberta general election: Whitecourt-Ste. Anne
Party	Candidate	Votes	%	±%
New Democratic	Oneil Carlier	5,442	35.90%	30.44%
Wildrose	John Bos	4,996	32.96%	-10.31%
Progressive Conservative	George Vanderburg	4,721	31.14%	-14.77%
Total		15,159	–	–
Rejected, spoiled and declined		79	–	–
Eligible electors / turnout		28,345	53.76%	-0.46%
New Democratic gain from Progressive Conservative		Swing		0.14%
Source(s) Source: "Whitecourt-Ste. Anne Official Results 2015 Alberta general election". Elections Alberta.
