= Whitecourt-Ste. Anne =

Defunct provincial electoral district in Alberta, Canada

Coordinates: 53.59°N 114.34°W

Alberta electoral district
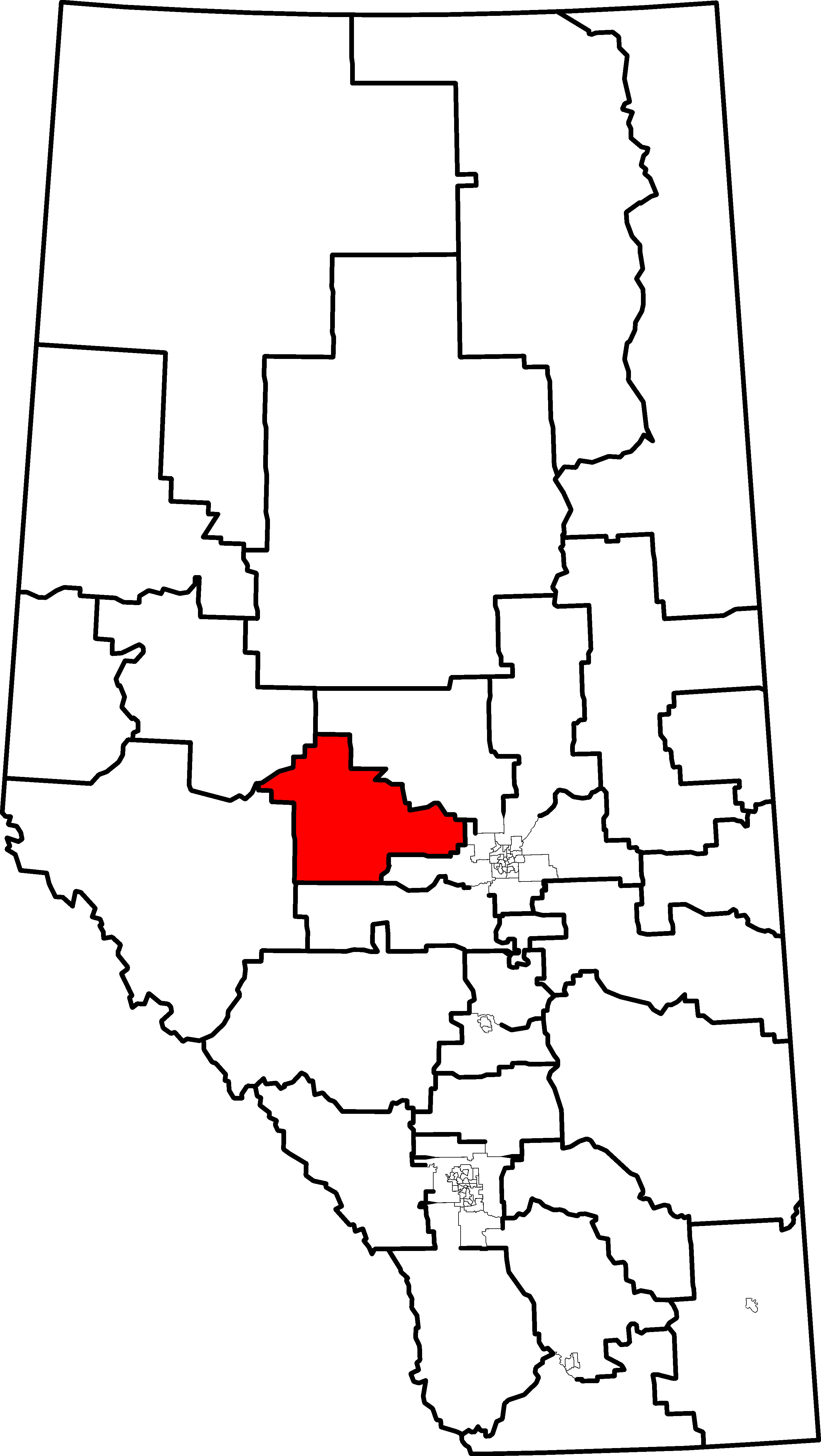
- 2010 boundaries

Defunct provincial electoral district
- Legislature: Legislative Assembly of Alberta
- District created: 1993
- District abolished: 2019
- First contested: 1993
- Last contested: 2015

Whitecourt-Ste. Anne was a provincial electoral district in Alberta, Canada, mandated to return a single member to the Legislative Assembly of Alberta using the first-past-the-post method of voting from 1993 to 2019.

Communities within the boundaries of the Whitecourt-Ste. Anne electoral district include Mayerthorpe, Onoway, and Whitecourt.

== History ==
The district was created in 1993 from the previous Whitecourt, Stony Plain and a portion of Barrhead electoral districts.

The 2010 electoral boundary re-distribution saw land north of Highway 16 from within Stony Plain transferred to this district.

=== Boundary history ===
83 Whitecourt-Ste. Anne 2003 boundaries
Bordering districts
North	East	West	South
Barrhead-Morinville-Westlock	Spruce Grove-Sturgeon-St. Albert	Grande Prairie-Smoky, West Yellowhead	Drayton Valley-Calmar, Stony Plain
riding map goes here			
Legal description from Electoral Divisions Act, S.A. 2003, c. E-4.1
Starting at the intersection of the east boundary of Rge. 14 W5 and the north boundary of Twp. 63; then 1. east along the north boundary to the east boundary of Rge. 11 W5; 2. south along the east boundary to the north boundary of Twp. 60; 3. east along the north boundary to the right bank of the Athabasca River; 4. upstream along the right bank to the east boundary of Rge. 9 W5; 5. south along the east boundary to the north boundary of Twp. 59; 6. east along the north boundary to the east boundary of Sec. 32, Twp. 59, Rge. 7 W5; 7. south along the east boundary of Secs. 32 and 29 in the Twp. to the north boundary of Sec. 21 in the Twp.; 8. east along the north boundary of Secs. 21, 22, 23 and 24 in the Twp. and the north boundary of Secs. 19, 20 and 21 in Twp. 59, Rge. 6 W5 to the east boundary of Sec. 21 in the Twp.; 9. south along the east boundary of Secs. 21, 16, 9 and 4 in the Twp. and Secs. 33 and 28 in Twp. 58 to the north boundary of Sec. 22 in Twp. 58, Rge. 6 W5; 10. east along the north boundary of Sec. 22 to the east boundary of Sec. 22; 11. south along the east boundary of Secs. 22, 15, 10 and 3 in the Twp. to the north boundary of Twp. 57; 12. east along the north boundary to the east boundary of the west half of Sec. 31, Twp. 57, Rge. 5 W5; 13. south along the east boundary of the west half of Secs. 31, 30, 19 and 18 in the Twp. to the right bank of the Pembina River; 14. downstream along the right bank of the Pembina River to the north boundary of Twp. 57; 15. east along the north boundary to the east boundary of Sec. 34, Twp. 57, Rge. 3 W5; 16. south along the east boundary of Secs. 34, 27 and 22 in the Twp. to the north boundary of the south half of Sec. 23 in the Twp.; 17. east along the north boundary of the south half of Secs. 23 and 24 in the Twp. to the east boundary of the west half of Sec. 24; 18. south along the east boundary of the west half of Secs. 24 and 13 in the Twp. to the north boundary of the south half of Sec. 13; 19. east along the north boundary to the east boundary of Rge. 3 W5; 20. south along the east boundary to the north boundary of Sec. 7, Twp. 57, Rge. 2 W5; 21. east along the north boundary to the east boundary of the west half of the Sec. 7; 22. south along the east boundary of the west half of Secs. 7 and 6 in the Twp. to the north boundary of Twp. 56; 23. east along the north boundary to the east boundary of Rge. 2 W5; 24. south along the east boundary to the north boundary of the south half of Sec. 19 in Twp. 56, Rge. 1 W5; 25. east along the north boundary of the south half of Secs. 19, 20, 21 and 22 in the Twp. to the east boundary of Sec. 22; 26. south along the east boundary to the north boundary of Sec. 14 in the Twp.; 27. east along the north boundary of Sec. 14 to the Alexander Indian Reserve No. 134; 28. south along the Alexander Indian Reserve No. 134 to the north shore of Sandy Lake at its intersection with the east boundary of Sec. 35, Twp. 55, Rge. 1 W5; 29. south along the east boundary of Secs. 35, 26, 23, 14, 11 and 2 in Twp. 55 and the east boundary of Secs. 35, 26, 23 and 14 in Twp. 54 to the north boundary of Sec. 11 in the Twp. 54 (Highway 633); 30. west along Highway 633 to the east boundary of Sec. 7 in Twp. 54 Rge. 1 W5; 31. south along the east boundary of Secs. 7 and 6 in the Twp. and the east boundary of Secs. 31 and 30 in Twp. 53, Rge. 1 W5 to the north boundary of Sec. 19 in the Twp.; 32. west along the north boundary of Sec. 19 in the Twp. and the north boundary of Secs. 24, 23, 22 and 21 in Twp. 53, Rge. 2 W5 to the east boundary of Sec. 29 in the Twp.; 33. north along the east boundary of Sec. 29 to the north boundary of Sec. 29; 34. west along the north boundary of Secs. 29 and 30 in the Twp. and the north boundary of Secs. 25, 26, 27, 28, 29 and 30 in Twp. 53, Rges. 3 and 4 W5 and the north boundary of Secs. 25, 26, 27 and 28 in Twp. 53, Rge. 5 W5 to the east boundary of Sec. 32 in the Twp.; 35. north along the boundary to the north boundary of Twp. 53; 36. west along the north boundary to the west shore of Isle Lake; 37. in a generally southwesterly direction along the west bank to the east boundary of Sec. 28 in Twp. 53, Rge. 6 W5; 38. north along the east boundary of Secs. 28 and 33 in the Twp. and the east boundary of Secs. 4, 9, 16, 21, 28 and 33 in Twp. 54, Rge. 6 W5 to the north boundary of Twp. 54; 39. west along the north boundary to the right bank of the Pembina River; 40. upstream along the right bank to the north boundary of Twp. 50; 41. west along the north boundary to the east boundary of Rge. 16 W5; 42. north along the east boundary to the north boundary of Twp. 57; 43. west along the north boundary to the east boundary of Rge. 18 W5; 44. north along the east boundary to the north boundary of Twp. 58; 45. west along the north boundary to the east boundary of Rge. 19 W5; 46. north along the east boundary to the right bank of the Athabasca River; 47. downstream along the right bank to the east boundary of Rge. 16 W5; 48. north along the east boundary to the north boundary of Twp. 61; 49. east along the north boundary to the east boundary of Rge. 15 W5; 50. north along the east boundary to the north boundary of Twp. 62; 51. east along the north boundary to the east boundary of Rge. 14 W5; 52. north along the east boundary to the starting point.
Note:

87 Whitecourt-Ste. Anne 2010 boundaries
Bordering districts
North	East	West	South
Barrhead-Morinville-Westlock and Grande Prairie-Smoky	Spruce Grove-St. Albert	West Yellowhead	Drayton Valley-Devon and Stony Plain
Note: Boundary descriptions were not used in the 2010 redistribution

=== Representation history ===
Members of the Legislative Assembly for Whitecourt-Ste. Anne
Assembly	Years	Member	Party
See Stony Plain 1905–1993 and Whitecourt 1971–1993
23rd	1993–1997	Peter Trynchy	Progressive; Conservative
24th	1997–2001	Peter Trynchy	Progressive; Conservative
25th	2001–2004	George VanderBurg	Progressive; Conservative
26th	2004–2008	George VanderBurg	Progressive; Conservative
27th	2008–2012	George VanderBurg	Progressive; Conservative
28th	2012–2015	George VanderBurg	Progressive; Conservative
29th	2015–2019	Oneil Carlier	New Democrat
See Lac Ste. Anne-Parkland and West Yellowhead 2019–

The electoral district was created in 1993 primarily from the districts of Whitecourt and Stony Plain. Long-time Progressive Conservative incumbent Peter Trynchy, who had been in the legislature since 1971 and held numerous cabinet portfolios, ran for re-election that year. Trynchy faced a tough fight to keep his seat from Liberal candidate Jurgen Preugschas. Trynchy ran for his final term in office in the 1997 election. He won a large majority to easily retain his seat.

The second member to represent the riding is George VanderBurg. He was elected to his first term with a landslide majority in the 2001 general election. He won a second term with a greatly reduced margin in the 2004 general election. VanderBurg was appointed to a cabinet portfolio in the Alberta government for the first time in 2006. He won his third term in office with a larger margin against Senator-in-waiting Link Byfield in the 2008 general election. In the 2012 general election, he retained his seat for a fourth term in office by a narrow margin over the Wildrose candidate, Maryann Chichak.

VanderBurg lost the seat in the 2015 general election to Oneil Carlier of the NDP, falling to third place behind Wildrose candidate John Bos. Following his election victory, Carlier was named Minister of Agriculture and Forestry in the new government.

== Legislative election results ==
=== 1993 ===
1993 Alberta general election
Party	Candidate	Votes	%	±%
Progressive Conservative	Peter Trynchy	5,600	48.23%	–
Liberal	Jurgen Preugschas	4,310	37.12%	–
New Democratic	Connie Oskoboiny	912	7.86%	–
Social Credit	Earle Cunningham	570	4.91%	–
Independent	Walter Bllznicenko	218	1.88%	–
Total		11,610	–	–
Rejected, spoiled and declined		30	–	–
Eligible electors / turnout		18,285	63.66%	–
Progressive Conservative pickup new district.				
Source(s) Source: "Whitecourt-Ste. Anne Official Results 1993 Alberta general election". Alberta Heritage Community Foundation.

=== 1997 ===
1997 Alberta general election
Party	Candidate	Votes	%	±%
Progressive Conservative	Peter Trynchy	5,759	54.33%	6.10%
Liberal	Sara Lynn Burrough	2,954	27.87%	-9.26%
Social Credit	Earle Cunningham	1,183	11.16%	6.25%
New Democratic	Chauncey Featherstone	704	6.64%	-1.21%
Total		10,600	–	–
Rejected, spoiled and declined		42	–	–
Eligible electors / turnout		18,970	56.10%	-7.56%
Progressive Conservative hold		Swing		7.68%
Source(s) Source: "Whitecourt-Ste. Anne Official Results 1997 Alberta general election". Alberta Heritage Community Foundation.

=== 2001 ===
2001 Alberta general election
Party	Candidate	Votes	%	±%
Progressive Conservative	George Vanderburg	7,579	68.66%	14.33%
Liberal	Derril Butler	2,890	26.18%	-1.69%
New Democratic	Wade Franko	570	5.16%	-1.48%
Total		11,039	–	–
Rejected, spoiled and declined		39	–	–
Eligible electors / turnout		20,462	54.14%	-1.96%
Progressive Conservative hold		Swing		8.01%
Source(s) Source: "Whitecourt-Ste. Anne Official Results 2001 Alberta general election". Alberta Heritage Community Foundation.

=== 2004 ===
2004 Alberta general election
Party	Candidate	Votes	%	±%
Progressive Conservative	George Vanderburg	5,073	52.74%	-15.92%
Alberta Alliance	David Dow	2,331	24.23%	–
Liberal	George Higgerty	1,219	12.67%	-13.51%
New Democratic	Leah Redmond	996	10.35%	5.19%
Total		9,619	–	–
Rejected, spoiled and declined		51	–	–
Eligible electors / turnout		20,681	46.76%	-7.38%
Progressive Conservative hold		Swing		-6.99%
Source(s) Source: "Whitecourt-Ste. Anne Official Results 2004 Alberta general election". Alberta Heritage Community Foundation.

=== 2008 ===
2008 Alberta general election
Party	Candidate	Votes	%	±%
Progressive Conservative	George Vanderburg	6,019	60.60%	7.86%
Wildrose	Link Byfield	2,146	21.61%	–
Liberal	Mike Gray	1,106	11.14%	-1.54%
New Democratic	Leah Redmond	661	6.66%	-3.70%
Total		9,932	–	–
Rejected, spoiled and declined		45	–	–
Eligible electors / turnout		22,396	44.55%	-2.21%
Progressive Conservative hold		Swing		5.24%
Source(s) Source: "Whitecourt-Ste. Anne Official Results 2008 Alberta general election". Elections Alberta.

=== 2012 ===
2012 Alberta general election
Party	Candidate	Votes	%	±%
Progressive Conservative	George Vanderburg	6,371	45.92%	-14.68%
Wildrose	Maryann Chichak	6,003	43.26%	21.66%
New Democratic	Blue Knox	757	5.46%	-1.20%
Liberal	Vern Hardman	744	5.36%	-5.77%
Total		13,875	–	–
Rejected, spoiled, and declined		67	–	–
Eligible electors / turnout		25,712	54.22%	9.68%
Progressive Conservative hold		Swing		-18.17%
Source(s) Source: "Whitecourt-Ste. Anne Official Results 2012 Alberta general election". Elections Alberta.

=== 2015 ===
2015 Alberta general election
Party	Candidate	Votes	%	±%
New Democratic	Oneil Carlier	5,442	35.90%	30.44%
Wildrose	John Bos	4,996	32.96%	-10.31%
Progressive Conservative	George Vanderburg	4,721	31.14%	-14.77%
Total		15,159	–	–
Rejected, spoiled and declined		79	–	–
Eligible electors / turnout		28,345	53.76%	-0.46%
New Democratic gain from Progressive Conservative		Swing		0.14%
Source(s) Source: "Whitecourt-Ste. Anne Official Results 2015 Alberta general election". Elections Alberta.

== Senate nominee election results ==
=== 2004 ===
2004 Senate nominee election results: Whitecourt-Ste. Anne				Turnout 46.84%	
Affiliation	Candidate	Votes	% votes	% ballots	Rank
Progressive Conservative	Cliff Breitkreuz	5,610	22.39%	64.36%	3
Progressive Conservative	Betty Unger	3,254	12.98%	37.33%	2
Progressive Conservative	Bert Brown	2,649	10.57%	30.39%	1
Independent	Link Byfield	2,373	9.47%	27.23%	4
Alberta Alliance	Michael Roth	2,221	8.87%	25.48%	7
Alberta Alliance	Vance Gough	2,081	8.31%	23.88%	8
Alberta Alliance	Gary Horan	2,026	8.09%	23.24%	10
Progressive Conservative	David Usherwood	1,907	7.62%	21.88%	6
Progressive Conservative	Jim Silye	1,646	6.57%	18.89%	5
Independent	Tom Sindlinger	1,286	5.13%	14.76%	9
Total votes		25,053	100%		
Total ballots		8,716	2.87 votes per ballot		
Rejected, spoiled and declined		970			

Voters had the option of selecting four candidates on the ballot

== Student vote results ==
=== 2004 ===
Participating schools
Evansview Elementary School
Grasmere School
Mayerthorpe Junior Senior High School
Onoway High School
Percy Baxter School
Sangudo Jr/Sr High School
St. Josephs School

On November 19, 2004, a student vote was conducted at participating Alberta schools to parallel the 2004 Alberta general election results. The vote was designed to educate students and simulate the electoral process for persons who have not yet reached the legal majority. The vote was conducted in 80 of the 83 provincial electoral districts with students voting for actual election candidates. Schools with a large student body that reside in another electoral district had the option to vote for candidates outside of the electoral district then where they were physically located.

2004 Alberta student vote results
Affiliation	Candidate	Votes	%
Progressive Conservative	George VanderBurg	437	46.15%
NDP	Leah Redmond	212	22.39%
Alberta Alliance	David Dow	210	22.17%
Liberal	George Higgerty	88	9.29%
Total		947	100%
Rejected, spoiled and declined		48	

=== 2012 ===
2012 Alberta student vote results
Affiliation	Candidate	Votes	%
Progressive Conservative	George VanderBurg		%
Wildrose	Maryann Chichak		
Liberal	Vern Hardman		%
NDP			%
Total			100%

== See also ==
- List of Alberta provincial electoral districts
- Canadian provincial electoral districts
