= Drayton Valley =

- Town
- Town of Drayton Valley
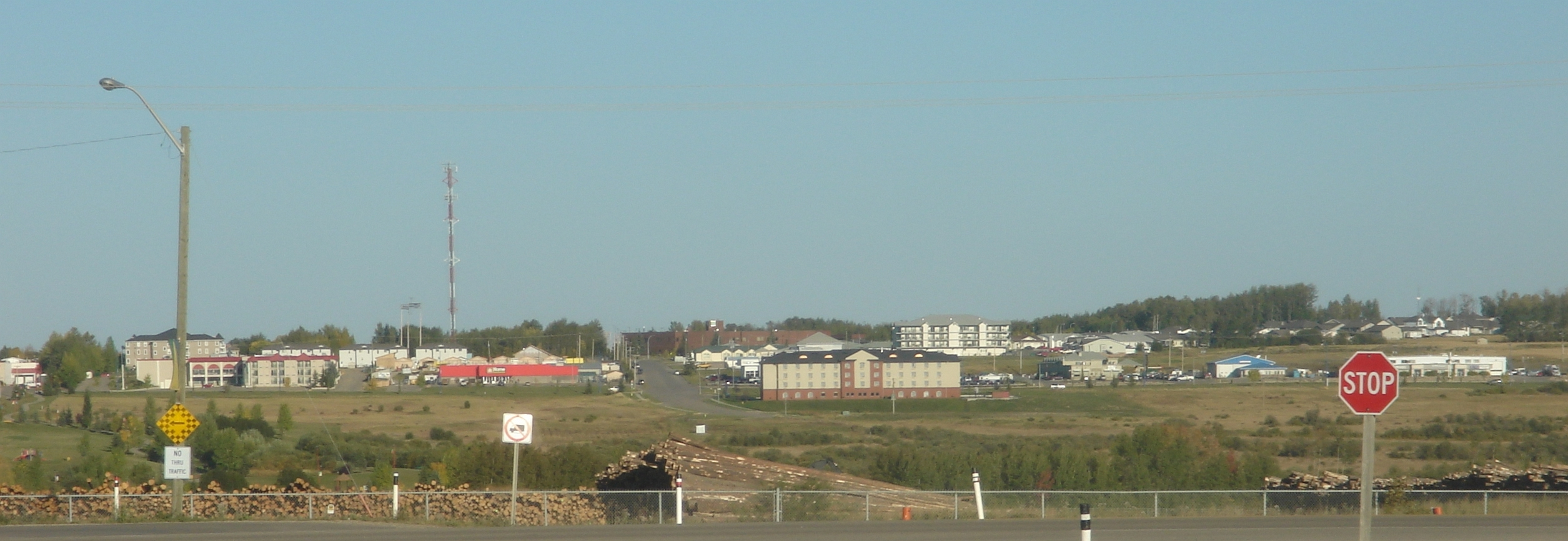
- Drayton Valley panorama
- Motto: Pulling together
- Location of Drayton Valley in Alberta
- Coordinates: 53°13′20″N 114°58′37″W
- Country: Canada
- Province: Alberta
- Region: Central Alberta
- Census division: 11
- Municipal district: Brazeau County
- Incorporated
  - Village: January 1, 1956
  - New town: June 1, 1956
  - Town: February 1, 1957

Government
  - Mayor: Nancy Dodds
  - Governing body: Drayton Valley Town Council
  - MP: Dane Lloyd (Parkland)
  - MLA: Andrew Boitchenko (Drayton Valley-Devon)

Area (2021)
  - Land: 30.9 km^{2} (11.9 sq mi)
- Elevation: 869 m (2,851 ft)

Population (2021)
  - Total: 7,291
  - Density: 236/km^{2} (610/sq mi)
- Time zone: UTC−06:00 (Alberta Time)
- Forward sortation area: T7A
- Area codes: +1-780, +1-587
- Highways: Highway 22
- Waterways: North Saskatchewan River
- Website: Official website

Drayton Valley is a town in central Alberta, Canada. It is located on Highway 22 (Cowboy Trail), approximately 133 kilometres (83 mi) southwest of Edmonton. It is surrounded by Brazeau County, known for its vast oil fields. The town is located between the North Saskatchewan River and the Pembina River.

The town was named after Drayton, Hampshire, the birthplace of the wife of one of the Alberta town's postmasters.

== History ==
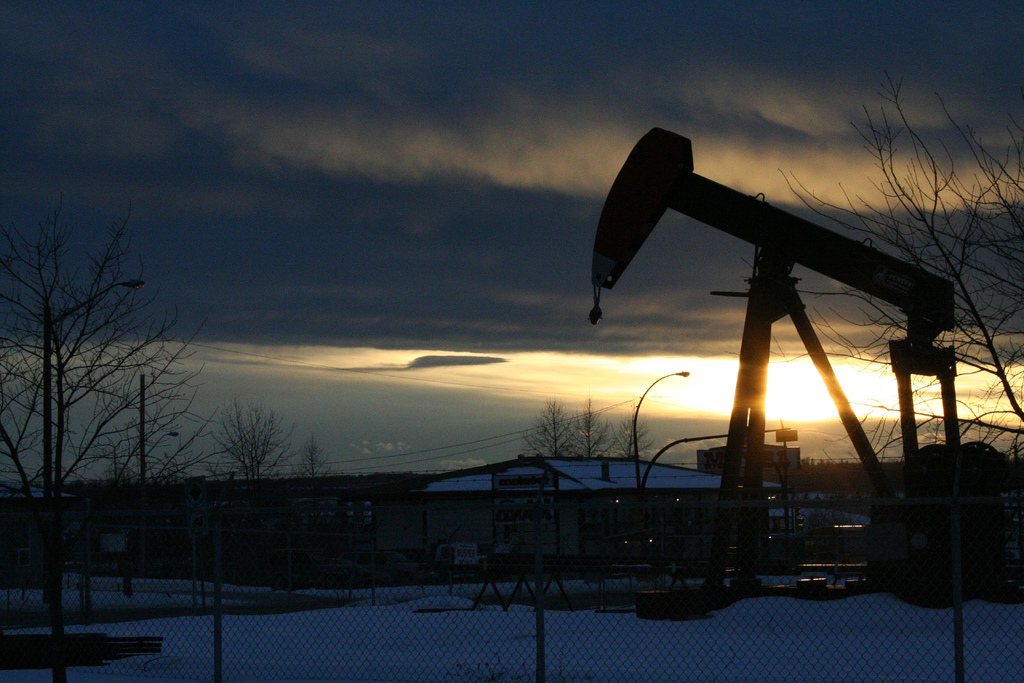
Drayton Valley is known for oil production

Prior to the 1953 oil boom, the community of Drayton Valley was sparsely populated. The main economic activities were farming and logging. Drayton Valley was incorporated as a village in 1956 and officially became a town in 1957. In 1955 a ferry was built to cross the North Saskatchewan River. The original bridge that replaced the ferry was eventually replaced by a new bridge in 2014.

== Demographics ==
In the 2021 Census of Population conducted by Statistics Canada, the Town of Drayton Valley had a population of 7,291 living in 2,897 of its 3,250 total private dwellings, a change of 0.8% from its 2016 population of 7,235. With a land area of 30.9 km^{2} (11.9 sq mi), it had a population density of 236.0/km^{2} (611.1/sq mi) in 2021.

In the 2016 Census of Population conducted by Statistics Canada, the Town of Drayton Valley recorded a population of 7,235 living in 2,782 of its 3,116 total private dwellings, a 1.6% change from its 2011 population of 7,118. With a land area of 30.72 km^{2} (11.86 sq mi), it had a population density of 235.5/km^{2} (610.0/sq mi) in 2016.

== Economy ==
Oil and gas is the primary driver of Drayton Valley's economy. Agriculture and forestry also play roles in the local economy. A sawmill is located in the town.

== Attractions ==
Drayton Valley's Omniplex is a community sports centre that hosts ice hockey, ringette, curling, soccer, baseball and rodeo. The town also has a public swimming pool, a bowling alley, and the Drayton Valley Golf and Country Club. It hosted a ski hill until 2024

== Sports ==
Drayton Valley is the home of the Drayton Valley Thunder of the Alberta Junior Hockey League. Drayton Valley is also home to the annual DV100 bicycle race.

== Education ==
Drayton Valley has six public schools, two Catholic schools, and one outreach school. The public schools and outreach school are operated by the Wild Rose School Division while the Catholic schools are operated by the St. Thomas Aquinas Catholic School Division.

Wild Rose School Division

- Aurora Elementary School
- Drayton Christian School
- Evergreen Elementary School
- Frank Maddock High School
- Frank Maddock Outreach School
- H.W. Pickup Junior High School

St. Thomas Aquinas Catholic School Division

- St. Anthony School
- Holy Trinity Academy

== Media ==
Drayton Valley is served by two weekly newspapers, the Drayton Valley Western Review and the Drayton Valley and District Free Press and one radio station, CIBW-FM, mainly playing country music. A Christian radio station, CIDV-FM, was launched in 2009.

== Notable people ==
- Diana Janet McQueen, Canadian politician, Progressive Conservative MLA (2008-2015)
- Dave Hakstol, NHL Head Coach for the Seattle Kraken
- Sid Neigum, Canadian fashion designer

== See also ==
- List of communities in Alberta
- List of towns in Alberta
