= Andrew Boitchenko =

Canadian politician from Alberta

The Honourable Andrew Boitchenko ECA MLA

Minister of Tourism and Sport
- Incumbent
- Assumed office May 16, 2025
- Premier: Danielle Smith
- Preceded by: Joseph Schow

Parliamentary Secretary for Indigenous Relations
- In office June 13, 2023 – May 16, 2025
- Premier: Danielle Smith
- Preceded by: Position Established
- Succeeded by: Position Abolished

MLA for Drayton Valley-Devon
- Incumbent
- Assumed office May 29, 2023
- Preceded by: Mark Smith

Personal details
- Born: Ukraine
- Party: UCP
- Occupation: Real estate agent

Andrew Boitchenko ECA MLA is a Canadian politician from the United Conservative Party. He was elected as a Member of the Legislative Assembly of Alberta for Drayton Valley-Devon in the 2023 Alberta general election.

Andrew Boitchenko was sworn in as Minister of Tourism and Sport on May 16, 2025. He previously served as the Parliamentary Secretary for Indigenous Relations.

Boitchenko was born in Ukraine and came to Canada in his teen years. He is a real estate agent.

== Electoral history ==
2023 Alberta general election: Drayton Valley-Devon
Party	Candidate	Votes	%	±%
United Conservative	Andrew Boitchenko	16,532	73.70	+2.58
New Democratic	Harry Singh	5,009	22.33	+5.69
Wildrose Loyalty Coalition	Jon Hokanson	580	2.59	–
Advantage Party	Dale Withers	189	0.84	-0.33
Solidarity Movement	Gail Tookey	121	0.54	–
Total		22,431	99.42	–
Rejected and declined		131	0.58	
Turnout		22,562	61.90	
Eligible voters		36,448		
United Conservative hold		Swing		-1.56
Source(s) Source: Elections Alberta

UCP Drayton Valley-Devon nomination contest: December 2-3, 2022

Candidate	Round 1		Round 2	
Candidate	Votes	%	Votes	%
Andrew Boitchenko	329	44.8	356	50.7
Carol Vowk	313	42.6	346	49.3
Kara Westerlund	93	12.7	Eliminated	
Total	735	100.0	702	100.0
