= Frank Maddock High School =

Location
- 4801 43 St; Drayton Valley, Alberta, T7A 1P4; Canada; 53°12′58″N 114°57′52″W

Information
- School type: High School
- Motto: Strive to Excel
- Founded: 1968
- School board: Wild Rose School Division
- Principal: Lara Jollymore
- Grades: 9–12
- Enrollment: 500
- Language: English
- Colours: Royal Blue & Gold
- Team name: Warriors, Amazons
- Website: fmhigh.ca

Frank Maddock High School is a public high school located in the town of Drayton Valley, Alberta, Canada.

== Organization ==
Frank Maddock is part of the Wild Rose School Division No. 66. The school educates around 500 students in grades 10–12. The grade 12 enrollment for 2011–2012 was 177. Most students come from the junior high schools of Wild Rose School Division and the majority live in Drayton Valley or the surrounding Brazeau County.

The school had a performance rating of 4.5/10 and was ranked 204 out of 253 Alberta high schools, by the Fraser Institute, for the 2019 school year.

== Athletics ==
Volleyball, basketball, badminton, cross country, golf, curling, rugby, football, handball and a track team are all offered at Frank Maddock. In the summer, the school holds NBC Camps (which provide overnight athletics programs).

The school hosted the 2013 ASAA Cross Country Provincial Championships.

== Facilities ==
This is Drayton Valley's largest school with an area of 95,000 sq. ft. A government infrastructure survey, carried out in July 2000, reported that the school required major modernization. The school is now expanding the facilities with the addition of a learning commons area. The design was produced by school alumnus Madison Janzen. The school incorporates a vocational education wing. This contains the cosmetology lab (for student stylists) and fabrication studies (including welding).

== Notable alumni ==
- Shane Dawson, former professional baseball pitcher
