= List of political parties in Alberta =

This article lists political parties in Alberta.

== Active parties ==
=== Represented parties in the Legislative Assembly of Alberta ===
Name	Founded	Ideology	Leader	Membership	MLAs	In legislature	In government
United Conservative	2017	Conservatism	Danielle Smith	123,915 (2022)	46 / 87	2017–present	2019–present
New Democratic	1962	Social democracy	Naheed Nenshi	85,227 (2024)	39 / 87	1971–1993, 1997–present	2015–2019
Progressive Tory (Note: Previously known as the Alberta Party.)	1985	Progressive conservatism	Peter Guthrie	6,543 (2018)	1 / 87	2011–2012, 2015–2019, 2025–present	—

=== Other parties registered with Elections Alberta ===
Name	Founded	Ideology	Leader	Membership	In Legislature	In Government
Liberal	1905	Liberalism	John Roggeveen	3,000-4,000 (2016)	1905–1944, 1948–1971, 1986–2019	1905–1921
Alberta Advantage	2017	Conservatism	Marilyn Burns		—	—
Independence	2017	Alberta Separatism	Ron Robertson (interim)		—	—
Communist	1930	Communism	Naomi Rankin		—	—
Green	2011	Green politics	James Anderson		—	—
Pro-Life (Note: Formed from the Social Credit Party of Alberta.)	2017	Anti-Abortion	Murray Ruhl		—	—
Wildrose Independence	2020	Alberta Separatism	Vacant	8,000 (2021)	—	—
Republican (Note: Known as the Buffalo Party from 2022 to 2025.)	2022	Alberta separatism, Pro-Americanism	Vacant	~35,000 (2026)	—	—
Wildrose Loyalty Coalition	2023	Economic liberalism	Paul Hinman		—	—
Solidarity Movement	2023	Social conservatism	Artur Pawlowski		—	—

=== Reserved party names ===
Name		Expiry Date
Alberta Now	ABN	February 21, 2027
Alberta Shield Party	ASP	March 11, 2027
National Party of Alberta	NPA	April 26, 2027
Alberta Infrastructure Party	AIP	April 26, 2027
Alberta Sovereignty Party	SOV	April 29, 2027
Iridescent Party	IPARTY	May 5, 2027

== Municipal parties and slates ==
Name	Date Registered	Type	Ideology	Leader	Membership	Councillors
Calgary
A Better Calgary Party	March 26, 2025	Municipal party	Conservatism	Gordon Elliott	2,000+ (2025)	1
The Calgary Party	November 19, 2024	Municipal party	Centrism	Brian Thiessen		1
Communities First	February 18, 2025	Municipal party	Conservatism	Sonya Sharp		4
Edmonton
Better Edmonton	May 28, 2025	Municipal party	Conservatism	Vacant		1
PACE (Note: Principled Accountable Coalition for Edmonton)	January 27, 2025	Municipal party	Localism	Doug Main		0

=== Defunct parties ===
Name	Date Registered	Date Deregistered	Type	Ideology
Edmonton
Yeg1st	April 24, 2025	September 22, 2025	Slate	

== Related federal parties ==
Name	Founded	Ideology
Western Independence Party	1987	Western Canada separatism

== Historical parties ==
=== Parties represented in the Legislature ===
Name	Years active	Succeeded by	Ideology	In Legislature	In Government
Alberta Alliance	2002–2008	Wildrose	Conservatism	2004–2008	—
Alberta Reform Movement	1981–1982	—	Conservatism	1981–1982	—
Co-operative Commonwealth Federation	1932–1962	New Democratic Party	Social democracy, democratic socialism	1944–1959	—
Dominion Labor	1919–1935	Co-operative Commonwealth Federation	Social democracy	1919–1935	—
Freedom Conservative	1999–2020 (Note: Merged with Wexit Alberta to form the Wildrose Independence Party)	Wildrose Independence	Albertan autonomism (Note: Historically the party used to promote entirely on Albertan Independence, until they adopted Albertan autonomism instead, as part of the party's transformation under Derek Fildebrandt's leadership.), Conservatism, Right-libertarianism	2018–2019	–
Independent Movement	1940–1948	—	Liberalism, conservatism	1940–1948	—
Labour Representation		Dominion Labor	Social democracy	1917–1919	—
Non-Partisan League	1916–1921	United Farmers of Alberta	Agrarianism, social democracy	1917–1921	—
Progressive Conservative	1905–2019	United Conservative	Liberal conservatism, Red Toryism	1905–1940, 1952–1963, 1967–2019	1971–2015
Representative	1984–1989	—	Conservatism, populism	1986–1989	—
Social Credit	1934–2017	Pro-Life Alberta	Social conservatism, Social credit (historical)	1935–1982	1935–1971
Socialist	1909–1921	—	Socialism	1909–1913	—
United Farmers of Alberta	1919–1937	—	Agrarianism, progressivism	1921–1935	1921–1935
Veterans' and Active Force	1944–1948	—	Veteran advocacy	1944–1948	—
Western Canada Concept	1982–1986	—	Alberta separatism, Western separatism	1982	—
Wildrose	2008–2017	United Conservative	Conservatism, right-wing populism	2009–2017	—

=== Parties never represented in the Legislature ===
Name	Years active	Succeeded by
Alberta First	1999–2018 (Note: Known as the Separation Party from 2004 to 2013, and the Western Freedom Party in 2018.)	Freedom Conservative
Alberta Independence	2000–2001	Independence Party (2017)
Alberta Independence Party	1989 election	—
Greens	1986–2009	Evergreen (2011)
Confederation of Regions	1986–1996	—
Forum Party of Alberta	1995–2004	—
Heritage Party	1985–1986	—
Independent Labour Party	1921	Leader Ernest Brown became active in Communist Party
Natural Law	1993–1997	—
Progressive Labour Party of Alberta	1932–1940	—
Reform	2016–2026	—
Unparty	1982 election	—

=== Parties represented by elected Senate nominees ===
- Reform Party of Alberta (1984–2004)

== See also ==
- Elections Alberta
