= 2008 Alberta general election =

- March 3, 2008

83 seats in the Legislative Assembly of Alberta 42 seats were needed for a majority
- Turnout: 40.59%
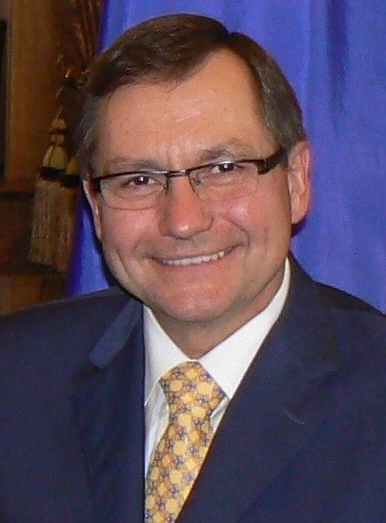

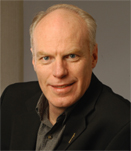

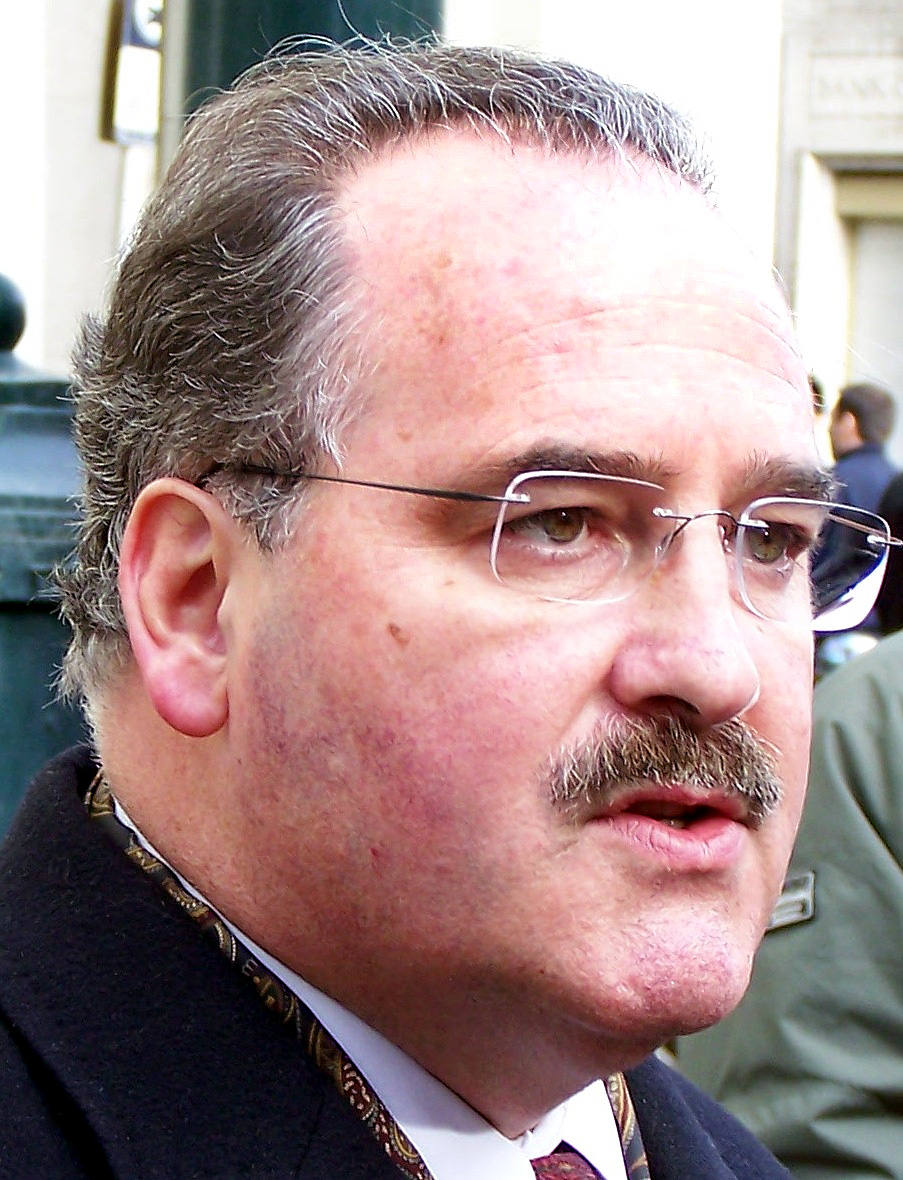

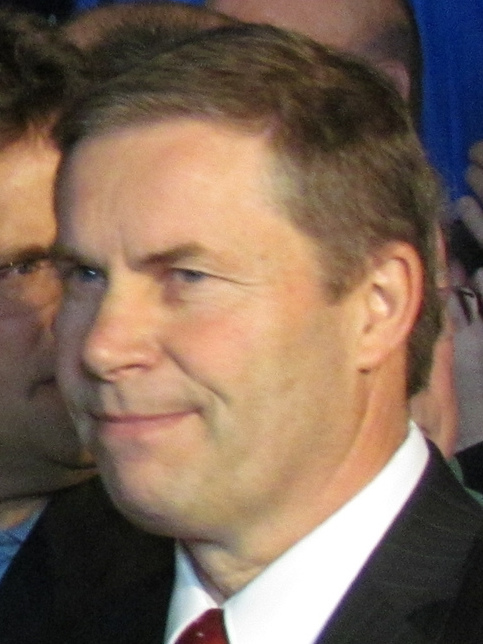
	Majority party	Minority party
Leader	Ed Stelmach	Kevin Taft
Party	Progressive Conservative	Liberal
Leader since	December 2, 2006	March 27, 2004
Leader's seat	Fort Saskatchewan-Vegreville	Edmonton-Riverview
Last election	62 seats, 46.8%	16 seats, 29.4%
Seats before	60	16
Seats won	72	9
Seat change	▲12	▼7
Popular vote	501,063	251,158
Percentage	52.7%	26.4%
Swing	▲5.9pp	▼3.0pp
	Third party	Fourth party
Leader	Brian Mason	Paul Hinman
Party	New Democratic	Wildrose Alliance
Leader since	July 13, 2004	2008
Leader's seat	Edmonton-Highlands-Norwood	Cardston-Taber-Warner (lost re-election)
Last election	4 seats, 10.2%	1 seats, 8.7%
Seats before	4	1
Seats won	2	0
Seat change	▼2	▼1
Popular vote	80,578	64,407
Percentage	8.5%	6.8%
Swing	▼1.7pp	▼1.9pp
- Popular vote by riding. As this is a first-past-the-post election, seat totals are not determined by total popular vote, but instead by results in each riding.
Premier before election
Ed Stelmach
Progressive Conservative
Premier after election
Ed Stelmach
Progressive Conservative

The 2008 Alberta general election was held on March 3, 2008, to elect members of the Legislative Assembly of Alberta.

It was expected to be called early because the governing Progressive Conservatives held a leadership election on December 2, 2006, in which Ed Stelmach was elected to replace Ralph Klein as party leader and Premier. The election was called when Stelmach formally advised Lieutenant Governor Norman Kwong to dissolve the Legislature, which happened on February 4, 2008.

With 53% of the popular vote, the Progressive Conservatives won a decisive majority over the Liberal and other parties, despite early suggestions of a closer race.

The 2008 election had the lowest voter turnout in the province's history, with only 40.59% of eligible voters casting a ballot.

== Results ==
The Progressive Conservatives increased their majority at the expense of all other parties in the legislature. The Tories also increased their share of the popular vote, and even though their share of the vote was still significantly less than it was in 2001, they managed to win just two fewer seats than they won in that election. This was largely a result of their continued widespread support in rural areas, as well as divided opposition support in Calgary and Edmonton. The Conservative gains came mostly in and around Edmonton, where the party recorded its best results since 1982.

The Liberals held on to official opposition status but sustained a net loss of seven seats. Bucking historic trends, the party was reduced to only three seats in Edmonton, but was able to win five seats in Calgary (a net gain of one seat and the largest total won by that party in that city in the past 50 years). The Liberals also held their existing seat in Lethbridge to win a total of nine seats.

The other parties that were represented in the legislature also suffered losses on election night. The New Democrats lost two of their four Edmonton seats, and the Wildrose Alliance Party was shut out of the legislature as their leader Paul Hinman was narrowly defeated in his own constituency of Cardston-Taber-Warner.

For the first time in history, a majority of the Liberal caucus were from Calgary and the combined number of Liberal and NDP MLAs from Edmonton did not exceed the number of those two parties' MLAs from Calgary.

=== Summary ===

Summary of the March 3, 2008 Legislative Assembly of Alberta election results
Party	Party leader	Number of candidates	Seats				Popular vote		
Party	Party leader	Number of candidates	2004	Dissol.	2008	% Change	#	%	Change (pp)
Progressive Conservative	Ed Stelmach	83	62^{1}	60	72	+20%	501,063	52.72	+5.92%
Liberal	Kevin Taft	82	16^{1}	16	9	-43.8%	251,158	26.43	-2.96%
New Democratic	Brian Mason	83	4	4	2	-50%	80,578	8.48	-1.72%
Wildrose Alliance	Paul Hinman	61	1	1	-	-100%	64,407	6.78	-1.92%^{2}
Greens	George Read	79	-	-	-	-	43,222	4.55	+1.80%
Independent		7	-	1	-	-100%	7,635	0.80	+0.69%
Social Credit	Len Skowronski	8	-	-	-	-	2,043	0.21	-1.02%
Separation	Bruce Hutton	1	-	-	-	-	119	0.01	-0.52%
Communist	Naomi Rankin	2	-	-	-	-	96	0.01	xx
Alberta Party	Bruce Stubbs	1	-	-	-	-	42	0.00	-0.28%
Vacant				1					
Total		407	83	83	83	-	950,363	100.00	

Notes:

- ^{1} Liberal Chris Kibermanis originally had a five-vote margin over Progressive Conservative Thomas Lukaszuk. A judicial recount on January 24, 2005, determined Thomas Lukaszuk the winner.
- ^{2} Results change is compared to the Alberta Alliance in 2004.

== Vote and seat summaries ==
Popular vote
PC	52.72%
Liberal	26.43%
NDP	8.48%
Wild Rose Alliance	6.78%
Green	4.55%
Independents	0.80%
Others	0.23%

Seat totals
PC	86.7%
Liberal	10.8%
NDP	2.4%

== Policy and other major announcements ==
=== Alberta Liberal Party ===
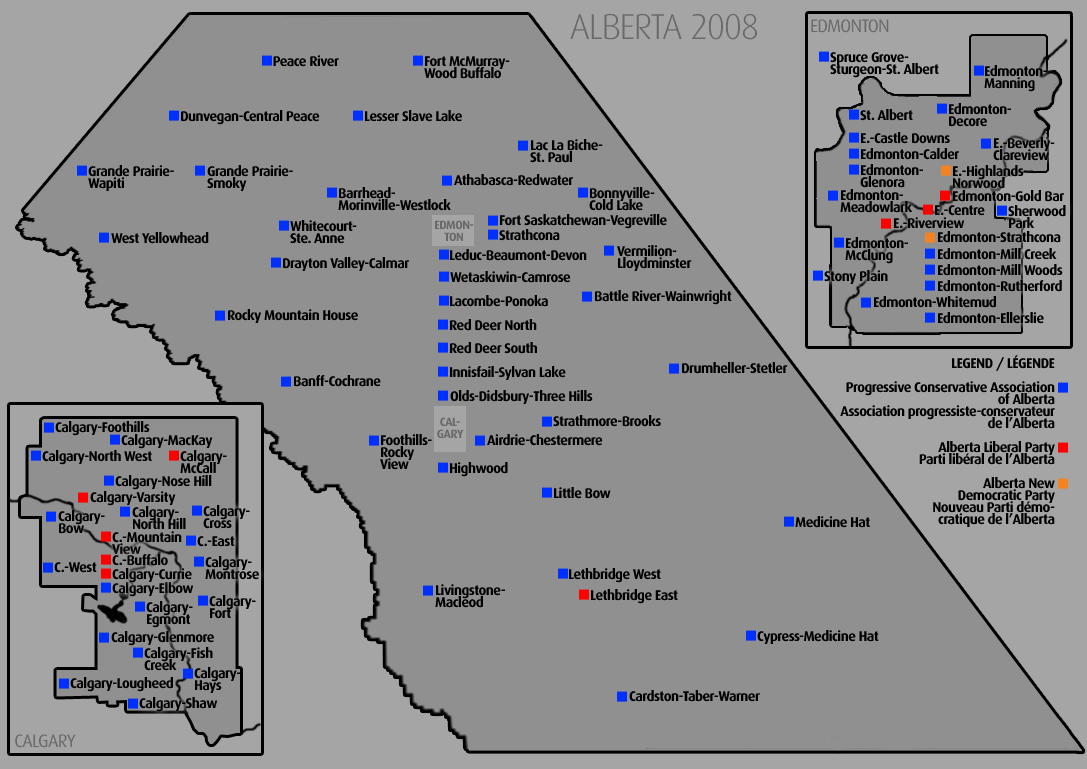
Map of election results

- Immediate elimination of health care premiums
- Increasing per capita spending on policy in Calgary from $16 to $20
- Re-legislation of tuition policy so it is made in open session
- Implementation of a public pharmacare program
- Using tobacco taxes, spend approximately $200 million to create a Community Wellness Fund which will seek to expand Family & Community Support Services and fund healthy living and lifestyle programs
- Redirect the $250 million Natural Gas Rebate Program towards incentives for energy efficiency
- Triple funding for the Alberta Foundation for the Arts
- Increase the number of health care workers
- Investment of 30% of all natural resource revenues in:
1. investment in the Heritage Fund so that income taxes can remain permanently low
2. elimination of the infrastructure deficit by 2014
3. establishment of an uncapped endowment for post-secondary education
4. establishment of a $500 million endowment fund for arts, social sciences, and humanities
- Elimination of the education section of the property tax for seniors (approx. $700 a year)
- Increasing the tax credit for seniors' caregivers to $9,355 from $4,355.
- Making both Calgary and Edmonton into independent cities via a "Big Cities" Charter
- Hiring 300 more police officers for Calgary and Edmonton
- Fixed election dates

Cost: Net costs are zero as a result of re-allocating existing dollars and increased royalty revenues.

=== New Democratic Party of Alberta ===
- Making life affordable
  - Create 4,000 new child care spaces.
  - Cap rates of $25/day ($500/month) for infant care and $9/day ($180/month) for after school care.
  - Regulate after-school care for children.
  - Increase start-up grants for daycare centres and day homes.
  - Provide additional sustainable grants to day cares to increase wages for childcare workers.
  - Introduce rent controls.
  - Introduce limits on condominium conversions.
- Full value royalties
  - Follow example set by Alaska and replace the royalty system.
  - Create an all-party, special committee of the legislature to investigate royalties and report back in three months.
  - Add a variable royalty structure that would increase the royalty revenues when oil prices pass a peak threshold.
  - Increase royalties on other non-renewable resources such as coal.
- Green energy plan
  - Create a green energy fund that will receive $2 billion a year primarily through enhanced royalties. Use that money to fund energy efficient retro-fitting and alternative energy production systems for individual houses and building.
  - Fund alternative power generation projects such as solar and wind farms.
  - Place hard caps on greenhouse gas emissions with penalties for companies that exceed targets — details to be worked out later.
  - Slow down the pace of development
- Big dollar signs out of politics
  - End campaign contributions from unions and corporations.
  - Table legislation binding all leadership and nomination contests to the same disclosure rules and donation limits of political parties.
- Immediately end health-care premiums.
- Create a new pharmaceutical agency to purchase drugs in bulk, negotiate prices with drug companies and find less costly options to brand-name drugs.
- Roll back tuition levels to 1999–2000 levels.
- Cap interest for student loans at prime.
- Invest $100 million in student housing immediately.
- Eliminate fees and fund-raising for learning essentials.
- Phase out funding for private schools.
- Hire 800 additional police officers
- Mandate basic value-added and upgrading for all bitumen mined in Alberta to be done in the province.
- Add an interim per barrel tax on all bitumen exported outside the province.
- Establish a bitumen pricing system.
- Start a public automobile insurance system.
- Provide stable funding for non-profit First Nation and Metis agencies.
- Tie AISH and social assistance rates to a market basket measure.
- Introduce $30 million in new funding for the Alberta Foundation for the Arts.

Cost: $477 million surplus, based on increased royalty rates, bitumen royalty premium and reverse corporate tax cuts.

=== Progressive Conservative Party of Alberta ===
- Elimination of health care premiums over four years
- Increase the number of health care workers
- Construct 18 new schools in Calgary and Edmonton, including health focused schools
- $6 billion a year to build and improve urban transit, highways, schools, parks and seniors facilities
- Tax credits to businesses and homeowners who renovate to utilize energy efficient appliances
- Reduce greenhouse gas emissions by 200 megatons by 2050
- Increase oil and gas revenue by $2 billion
- Introduce royalty that would increase with the price of oil
- Create a secretariat for action on homelessness
- Create a new cultural policy that includes recreation and sport along with arts and performance
- Double the tax credit for those supporting dependent family members

Cost: Total commitments represent 4.2 per cent of the budget for 2008–09 or $1.5 billion.

=== Wildrose Alliance Party of Alberta ===
- Immediately eliminate health care premiums
- Raise the basic personal income tax exemption to $20,000
- Cut the provincial corporate tax rate from 10% to 8%
- Allow income splitting for taxpayers who care for dependents in times of medical or other crisis
- Direct savings from slowing spending growth to the Heritage Fund so that personal income taxes can eventually be eliminated
- Allow governance and service delivery at the municipal and community levels as much as possible
- As part of the party's universal health care plan, implement a pilot program in one of the smaller health regions that will be modelled after funding following the patients rather than the per capita funding currently in place today. Similarly, establish a school choice voucher pilot.
- Provide significant debt relief to Alberta-trained medical professionals who commit to practising in the province at least five years
- Establish fixed election dates, allow for citizen initiatives via referendums, and enact the right to recall elected officials

Costs: Cost of promises not released.

=== Alberta Greens ===
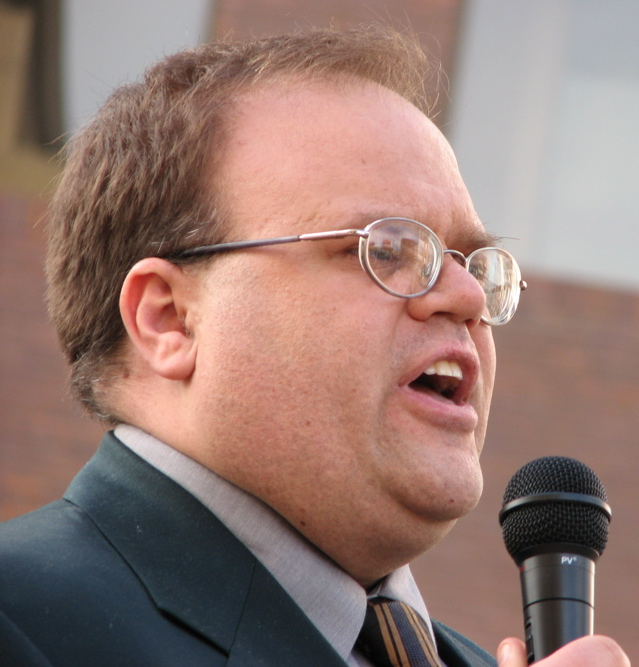
George Read, Leader of the Alberta Greens during the 2008 general election

- Green tax shift (i.e. lower income and business taxes in exchange for higher resource taxes)
- Community-based development
- Balanced budgets and fiscal responsibility
- Recovery of waste energy through co-generation
- Assessing royalty waste on a reservoir by reservoir basis
- Provide low interest loans to businesses for energy retrofits
- Provide no interest loans to homes for energy conservation
- Ban the use of cosmetic pesticides
- Increase spending in the Child Welfare Department
- Pass a Protected Lands Act that will clarify different land uses. The act will include:
1. Increase land designated as protected
2. Protect the Yellowstone to Yukon (Y2Y) corridor
3. Authority and resources to enforce the legislation for protected areas officers
- Increasing the supply of affordable housing
1. More housing cooperatives and co-housing type developments
2. Ensuring units are maintained by organizations that have a vested interest in sustaining them
- Working with the municipalities to make urban development plans that preserve farmland
- Investing in public transit
- Ensuring a continued supply of fresh water

Leader's statement

== Results by region ==
Party name		Cgy.	Edm.^{1}	Leth.	R.D.	North	Central	South	Total
Progressive Conservative	Seats:	18	13	1	2	10	20	8	72
Progressive Conservative	Popular vote:	45.81%	42.74%	46.16%	55.46%	65.83%	65.13%	60.85%	52.66%
Liberal	Seats:	5	3	1	0	0	0	0	9
Liberal	Popular vote:	33.90%	33.47%	34.34%	25.30%	13.95%	16.60%	15.75%	26.37%
New Democrats	Seats:	0	2	0	0	0	0	0	2
New Democrats	Popular vote:	4.21%	18.01%	8.87%	5.79%	11.00%	5.59%	3.74%	8.52%
Total seats:		23	18	2	2	10	20	8	83
Parties that won no seats:
Wildrose Alliance	Popular vote:	8.96%	1.51%	7.61%	7.74%	5.65%	5.86%	16.02%	6.77%
Greens	Popular vote:	4.87%	3.16%	3.02%	5.71%	3.19%	6.12%	3.63%	4.58%
Social Credit	Popular vote:	0.20%	0.06%	xx	xx	0.39%	0.54%	xx	0.22%
Separation	Popular Vote:	xx	xx	xx	xx	xx	0.05%	xx	0.01%
Communist	Popular vote:	0.02%	0.02%	xx	xx	xx	xx	xx	0.01%
Alberta Party	Popular vote:	xx	0.02%	xx	xx	xx	xx	xx	0.01%
Independents	Popular vote:	2.04%	0.96%	xx	xx	xx	0.12%	xx	0.87%

^{1} "Edmonton" corresponds to only the city of Edmonton. (Only the ridings whose names begin with "Edmonton".) The four suburban ridings around the city as listed below are grouped with central Alberta in this table.

== Opinion polls ==
Polling Firm	Last Date of Polling	Link	Prog. Cons.	Liberal	New Democratic	Alliance	Greens
Election results	March 3, 2008		53%	26%	9%	7%	5%
Angus Reid Strategies	February 29, 2008		43%	28%	13%	10%	7%
Strategic Counsel	February 28, 2008		50%	25%	8%	10%	8%
Leger Marketing	February 25, 2008		55%	24%	7%	8%	6%
Angus Reid Strategies	February 20, 2008		42%	31%	9%	10%	8%
Ipsos-Reid	February 17, 2008		49%	28%	14%	5%	4%
Environics	February 7, 2008		52%	25%	10%	6%	7%
Leger Marketing	January 24, 2008		49%	28%	11%	5%	8%
Strategic Counsel	January 13, 2008		58%	19%	9%	5%	9%
Last election	22 November 2004		48.8%	29.4%	10.2%	8.7%	2.8%

== Target ridings ==
The following is a list of ridings that were narrowly lost by the indicated party in the 2004 election. For instance, under the Liberal column are the nine seats in which they came closest to winning but did not. Listed is the name of the riding, followed by the party which was victorious (in parentheses) and the margin, in terms of percentage of the vote, by which the party lost.

These ridings were likely targeted by the specified party because the party lost them by a very slim margin in the 2004 election.

Up to ten are shown, with a maximum margin of victory of 15%.

* Indicates incumbent not running again.

Progressive Conservative Association of Alberta	Alberta Liberal Party
1. Cardston-Taber-Warner, (WA) 1.5%; 2. Edmonton-Meadowlark, (Lib) 1.8%; 3. Edmonton-Ellerslie, (Lib) 2.0%; 4. Edmonton-Manning, (Lib) 2.6%; 5. St. Albert, (Lib) 2.7%; 6. Edmonton-Calder, (NDP) 3.0%; 7. Edmonton-McClung, (Lib) 4.1%; 8. Lethbridge-East, (Lib) 5.0%; 9. Calgary-Varsity, (Lib) 5.3%; 10. Calgary-Currie, (Lib) 5.7%	1. Edmonton-Castle Downs, (PC) <0.1%; 2. Calgary-McCall, (PC) 4.1%; 3. Spruce Grove-Sturgeon-St. Albert, (PC) 4.4%; 4. Edmonton-Whitemud, (PC) 5.7%; 5. Edmonton-Mill Creek, (PC) 6.5%; 6. Calgary-Buffalo, (PC) 7.7%; 7. Edmonton-Calder, (NDP) 9.6%; 8. Red Deer-South, (PC) 10.8%; 9. Sherwood Park, (PC) 11.2%
Alberta New Democratic Party	Wildrose Alliance Party
1. Edmonton-Glenora, (Lib) 4.2%; 2. Edmonton Ellerslie, (Lib) 11.7%; 3. Edmonton Manning, (Lib) 14.2%	1. Dunvegan-Central Peace, (PC) 4.1%

== MLAs not running again ==
Liberal

- Maurice Tougas, Edmonton-Meadowlark

NDP

- Raj Pannu, Edmonton-Strathcona

Progressive Conservative

- Tony Abbott, Drayton Valley-Calmar
- Mike Cardinal, Athabasca-Redwater
- Harvey Cenaiko, Calgary-Buffalo
- David Coutts, Livingstone-Macleod
- Victor Doerksen, Red Deer-South
- Denis Ducharme, Bonnyville-Cold Lake
- Clint Dunford, Lethbridge-West
- Gordon Graydon, Grande Prairie-Wapiti
- Carol Haley, Airdrie-Chestermere
- Denis Herard, Calgary-Egmont
- LeRoy Johnson, Wetaskiwin-Camrose
- Rob Lougheed, Strathcona
- Greg Melchin, Calgary-North West
- Richard Magnus, Calgary-North Hill
- Lyle Oberg, Strathmore-Brooks
- Hung Pham, Calgary-Montrose
- Ivan Strang, West Yellowhead
- Gary Mar, Calgary-Mackay

== Timeline ==
- November 19, 2005 Paul Hinman, Cardston-Taber-Warner MLA is elected leader of the Alberta Alliance Party replacing Randy Thorsteinson at a leadership convention in Red Deer, Alberta.
- March 29, 2006 Premier Ralph Klein is given a 55% leadership review, he later announced his retirement for the fall of 2006.
- September 20, 2006 Premier Ralph Klein gives notice to the Progressive Conservatives, announces he will leave when a new leader is picked.
- November 23, 2006 Dan Backs is removed from the Liberal caucus and is forced to sit as an independent
- December 15, 2006 Ed Stelmach replaces Ralph Klein as premier.
- January 15, 2007 Former Premier Ralph Klein and former Deputy Premier Shirley McClellan resign their legislature seats.
- June 12, 2007 By-elections are held in the seats vacated on January 15. While Jack Hayden easily holds the Drumheller-Stettler riding for the Progressive Conservatives, Craig Cheffins takes Premier Klein's old seat, Calgary Elbow, for the Liberals.
- November 3, 2007 Len Skowronski is elected Leader of Social Credit replacing Lavern Ahlstrom
- December 3, 2007 Gary Mar resigns his seat of Calgary Mackay after he was appointed as Alberta's representative to Washington, D.C.
- January 19, 2008 The Wildrose Party of Alberta and the Alberta Alliance Party merge to form the Wildrose Alliance Party of Alberta.
- February 4, 2008 The writ is dropped.
- February 21, 2008 Stelmach, Taft, Mason, and Hinman square off in a leaders' debate.
- March 3, 2008, 8:22 p.m.: CTV Calgary declares a PC majority barely twenty minutes after the polls close. A CTV reporter asks Ed Stelmach about it, but the Premier has no real answer.
  - 8:29 p.m.: Less than half an hour after the polls close, and less than 25 minutes after the first polling station reports, CBC News declares a PC majority; Ed Stelmach begins a brief speech thanking party workers in Calgary while the CBC anchor is making the declaration.
  - 9:45 p.m.: Kevin Taft concedes victory. Despite the poor result, he announces his intention to remain party leader.
  - 10:36 p.m.: Ed Stelmach formally claims victory in Edmonton.

== Nominated candidates ==
Party	Seats	Second	Third	Fourth
Progressive Conservative	72	11	0	0
Liberal	9	58	13	2
New Democratic Party	2	4	34	16
Wildrose Alliance	0	7	30	17
Greens	0	2	4	47
Independents	0	1	2	1

Party	Average # of votes
Progressive Conservative	6,063
Liberal	3,059
Wildrose Alliance	1,055
New Democrat	976
Greens	551
Social Credit	256
Separation	120
Alberta Party	51
Communist	48

Names in bold indicate party leaders and cabinet ministers.

=== Northern Alberta ===
Electoral district	Candidates						Incumbent
Electoral district	PC	Liberal	NDP	Wildrose Alliance	Greens	Other	Incumbent
Athabasca-Redwater	Jeff Johnson; 7,484 (67.99%)	Bill Bonko; 1,379 (12.53%)	Peter Opryshko; 1,225 (11.13%)	Mike Radojcic; 517 (4.69%)	Phyllis Penchuk; 403 (3.66%)		Mike Cardinal
Barrhead-Morinville-Westlock	Ken Kowalski; 8,312 (70.26%)	Leslie Penny; 1,804 (15.25%)	Rod Olstad; 927 (7.83%)		Dan Evans; 479 (4.05%)	Carl Haugen (SC); 309 (2.61%)	**Ken Kowalski**
Bonnyville-Cold Lake	Genia Leskiw; 4,437 (75.54%)	Justin Yassoub; 698 (11.88%)	Jason Sloychuk; 389 (6.62%)		Jennifer Brown; 350 (5.96%)		Denis Ducharme
Dunvegan-Central Peace	Hector Goudreau; 4,147 (51.99%)	Bob Woken; 288 (3.61%)	Nathan Macklin; 1,202 (15.07%)	Dale Lueken; 2,339 (29.33%)			**Hector Goudreau**
Fort McMurray-Wood Buffalo	Guy Boutilier; 4,519 (63.41%)	Ross Jacobs; 1,758 (24.67%)	Mel Kraley; 550 (7.72%)		Reginald (Reg) Normore; 300 (4.21%)		**Guy Boutilier**
Grande Prairie Smoky	Mel Knight; 4,769 (59.44%)	John Croken; 1,089 (13.57%)	Neil Peacock; 832 (10.37%)	Todd Loewen; 1,049 (13.07%)	Rebecca Villebrun; 285 (3.55%)		**Mel Knight**
Grande Prairie Wapiti	Wayne Drysdale; 5,145 (66.70%)	Augustine Ebinu; 1,304 (16.90%)	Manuella Campbell; 829 (10.75%)		Art Proctor; 436 (5.65%)		Gordon Graydon
Lac La Biche-St. Paul	Ray Danyluk; 6,527 (71.28%)	Alex Broadbent; 1,627 (17.77%)	Della Drury; 1,003 (10.95%)				Ray Danyluk
Lesser Slave Lake	Pearl Calahasen; 3,384 (65.18%)	Steve Noskey; 1,109 (21.36%)	Habby Sharkawi; 426 (8.20%)		Bonnie Raho; 273 (5.26%)		Pearl Calahasen
Peace River	Frank Oberle; 3,265 (64.63%)		Adele Boucher Rymhs; 1,248 (24.70%)	Georg Beinart; 539 (10.67%)			Frank Oberle

=== Western and Central Alberta ===
Electoral district	Candidates						Incumbent
Electoral district	PC	Liberal	NDP	Wildrose Alliance	Greens	Other	Incumbent
Banff-Cochrane	Janis Tarchuk; 4,727 (49.34%)	Patricia K. Robertson; 2,753 (28.74%)	Anne Wilson; 575 (6.00%)		Dan Cunin; 1,353 (14.12%)	Zrinko Amerl (Ind.); 172 (1.80%)	Janis Tarchuk
Drayton Valley-Calmar	Diana McQueen; 5,931 (58.74%)	Norma Block; 846 (8.38%)	Luanne Bannister; 390 (3.86%)	Dean Schmale; 1,053 (10.43%)	Edwin Erickson; 1,877 (18.59%)		Tony Abbott
Foothills-Rocky View	Ted Morton; 6,916 (57.41%)	Herb Coburn; 2,200 (18.26%)	Ricardo de Menezes; 196 (1.63%)	Joseph McMaster; 1,797 (14.92%)	Larry Ashmore; 937 (7.78%)		**Ted Morton**
Innisfail-Sylvan Lake	Luke Ouellette; 6,967 (62.82%)	Garth Davis; 1,539 (13.88%)	Tophie Davies; 702 (6.33%)	Wayne Edmundson; 1,215 (10.96%)	Lisa Grant; 545 (4.91%)	Anthony Haggarty (Ind); 122 (1.10%)	**Luke Ouellette**
Olds-Didsbury-Three Hills	Richard Marz; 7,837 (64.06%)	Tony Vonesch; 1,038 (8.49%)	Andy Davies; 268 (2.19%)	Curt Engel; 2,572 (21.03%)	Kate Haddow; 518 (4.23%)		Richard Marz
Red Deer North	Mary Anne Jablonski; 4,715 (57.94%)	Richard Farrand; 1,770 (21.75%)	Shawn Nielsen; 560 (6.88%)	Urs Lehner; 630 (7.74%)	Rueben Tschetter; 463 (5.69%)		Mary Anne Jablonski
Red Deer South	Cal Dallas; 7,139 (56.18%)	Diane Kubanek; 3,414 (26.86%)	Teresa Bryanton; 597 (4.70%)	Ed Klop; 949 (7.47%)	Evan Bedford; 609 (4.79%)		Victor Doerksen
Rocky Mountain House	Ty Lund; 6,188 (62.30%)	Norm McDougall; 849 (8.55%)	Jorge Souza; 279 (2.81%)	Fanie van Heerden; 1,156 (11.64%)	Jennifer Ripley; 699 (7.03%)	Wilf Tricker (SC); 643 (6.47%); **Bruce Hutton** (SPA); 119 (1.20%)	Ty Lund
Stony Plain	Fred Lindsay; 8,467 (63.38%)	Bill Fraser; 2,552 (19.10%)	Shelina Brown; 976 (7.31%)	Sandy Pariseau; 793 (5.94%)	Nora Shea; 571 (4.27%)		**Fred Lindsay**
West Yellowhead	Robin Campbell; 4,206 (53.83%)	Lisa Higgerty; 1,932 (24.72%)	Ken Kuzminski; 1,054 (13.49%)	Earle Cunningham; 326 (4.17%)	Scott Pickett; 296 (3.79%)		Ivan Strang
Whitecourt-Ste. Anne	George VanderBurg; 6,019 (60.60%)	Mike Grey; 1,106 (11.14%)	Leah Redmond; 661 (6.65%)	Link Byfield; 2,146 (21.61%)			George VanderBurg

=== East Central Alberta ===
Electoral district	Candidates						Incumbent
Electoral district	PC	Liberal	NDP	Wildrose Alliance	Greens	Other	Incumbent
Battle River-Wainwright	Doug Griffiths; 7,968 (78.57%)	Horst Schreiber; 1,260 (12.42%)	Doris Bannister; 431 (4.25%)		Will Munsey; 483 (4.76%)		Doug Griffiths
Drumheller-Stettler	Jack Hayden; 6,986 (68.90%)	Tom Dooley; 1,463 (14.43%)	Richard Bough; 276 (2.72%)	Dave France; 1,062 (10.47%)	Amanda Bolton; 353 (3.48%)		Jack Hayden
Fort Saskatchewan-Vegreville	**Ed Stelmach**; 11,169 (78.13%)	Earl J. Woods; 1,343 (9.39%)	Clayton Marsden; 1,233 (8.63%)		Ryan Scheie; 551 (3.85%)		**Ed Stelmach**
Lacombe-Ponoka	Ray Prins; 8,202 (58.18%)	Edith McPhedran; 1,200 (8.51%)	Steve Bradshaw; 560 (3.97%)	Daniel Freisen; 911 (6.46%)	Joe Anglin; 3,226 (22.88%)		Ray Prins
Leduc-Beaumont-Devon	George Rogers; 9,045 (64.91%)	Joyce Assen; 2,329 (16.72%)	Lisa Erickson; 1,057 (7.59%)	Sharon MacLise; 1,008 (7.23%)	Kevin Colton; 495 (3.55%)		George Rogers
Vermilion-Lloydminster	Lloyd Snelgrove; 7,013 (80.75%)	Robert Sawatzky; 826 (9.51%)	Wendy Myshak; 482 (5.55%)		Ngaio Hotte; 364 (4.19%)		Lloyd Snelgrove
Wetaskiwin-Camrose	Verlyn Olson; 7,726 (65.89%)	Keith Elliott; 1,646 (14.04%)	Sarah Mowat; 1,078 (9.19%)	Tyler Knelsen; 818 (6.98%)	Midge Lambert; 458 (3.90%)		LeRoy Johnson

=== Central Edmonton ===
Electoral district	Candidates						Incumbent
Electoral district	PC	Liberal	NDP	Wildrose Alliance	Greens	Other	Incumbent
Edmonton Beverly Clareview	Tony Vandermeer; 4,182 (39.63%)	Dawit Isaac; 1,996 (18.92%)	Ray Martin; 3,845 (36.44%)	Brian Dell; 289 (2.74%)	Frederick Pivot; 183 (1.73%)	Robin Porteous (SC); 57 (0.54%)	Ray Martin
Edmonton Centre	Bill Donahue; 3,291 (29.36%)	Laurie Blakeman; 5,042 (44.98%)	Deron Bilous; 2,163 (19.30%)	James Iverson; 200 (1.78%)	David Parker; 472 (4.21%)	Margaret Saunter (AP); 42 (0.37%)	Laurie Blakeman
Edmonton-Glenora	Heather Klimchuk; 4,604 (39.90%)	Bruce Miller; 4,508 (39.07%)	Arlene Chapman; 1,743 (15.11%)	Elden Van Hauwaert; 275 (2.38%)	Peter Johnston; 408 (3.54%)		Bruce Miller
Edmonton Gold Bar	David Dorward; 5,261 (37.61%)	Hugh MacDonald; 6,279 (44.89%)	Sherry McKibben; 1,923 (13.75%)		David Zylstra; 525 (3.75%)		Hugh MacDonald
Edmonton Highlands-Norwood	Andrew Beniuk; 2,978 (31.92%)	Brad Smith; 1,132 (12.13%)	**Brian Mason**; 4,754 (50.95%)	Travis Loewen; 245 (2.63%)	Mohamad Maie; 221 (2.37%)		**Brian Mason**
Edmonton Mill Creek	Gene Zwozdesky; 6,857 (50.78%)	Aman Gill; 4,058 (30.05%)	Stephen Anderson; 1,822 (13.49%)		Glen Argan; 726 (5.38%)	**Naomi Rankin** (Com); 41 (0.30%)	**Gene Zwozdesky**
Edmonton-Mill Woods	Carl Benito; 4,752 (43.87%)	Weslyn Mather; 3,996 (36.89%)	Christina Gray; 1,474 (13.61%)	Robert Leddy; 321 (2.95%)	David Hruska; 289 (2.68%)		Weslyn Mather
Edmonton Riverview	Wendy Andrews; 5,171 (35.03%)	**Kevin Taft**; 7,471 (50.61%)	Erica Bullwinkle; 1,284 (8.70%)	Kyle Van Hauwaert; 329 (2.23%)	Cameron Wakefield; 506 (3.43%)		**Kevin Taft**
Edmonton Rutherford	Fred Horne; 5,225 (42.49%)	Rick Miller; 5,167 (42.02%)	Mike Butler; 1,178 (9.58%)	John Baloun; 379 (3.08%)	Kate Wyrostok; 348 (2.83%)		Rick Miller
Edmonton Strathcona	T.J. Keil; 3,031 (25.50%)	Tim Vant; 2,452 (20.63%)	Rachel Notley; 5,862 (49.32%)		Adrian Cole; 540 (4.55%)		Raj Pannu

=== Suburban Edmonton and environs ===
Electoral district	Candidates						Incumbent
Electoral district	PC	Liberal	NDP	Wildrose Alliance	Greens	Other	Incumbent
Edmonton-Calder	Doug Elniski; 4,557 (40.86%)	Jim Kane; 1,839 (16.49%)	David Eggen; 4,356 (39.05%)		Mike Brown; 402 (3.60%)		David Eggen
Edmonton Castle Downs	Thomas Lukaszuk; 7,159 (51.55%)	Chris Kibermanis; 5,090 (36.65%)	Ali Haymour; 1,341 (9.66%)		Bob Reckhow; 297 (2.14%)		Thomas Lukaszuk
Edmonton Decore	Janice Sarich; 4,577 (45.71%)	Bill Bonko; 3,895 (38.89%)	Sidney Sadik; 1,301 (12.99%)		Trey Capenhurst; 241 (2.41%)		Bill Bonko
Edmonton Ellerslie	Naresh Bhardwaj; 4,581 (41.90%)	Bharat Agnihotri; 3,592 (32.86%)	Marilyn Assheton-Smith; 1,891 (17.30%)	Krista Leddy; 471 (4.31%)	Paul Boos; 335 (3.06%)	Cheryl Ullah (SC); 62 (0.57%)	Bharat Agnihotri
Edmonton Manning	Peter Sandhu; 4,107 (35.79%)	Sandeep Dhir; 2,260 (19.70%)	Rick Murti; 2,307 (20.11%)	Phil Gamache; 289 (2.52%)	Odette Boily; 235 (2.05%)	Dan Backs (Ind.); 2,275 (19.83%)	Dan Backs
Edmonton McClung	David Xiao; 7,173 (48.94%)	Mo Elsalhy; 5,947 (40.57%)	Bridget Stirling; 924 (6.30%)	Kristine Jassman; 272 (1.86%)	Bryan Wyrostok; 342 (2.33%)		Mo Elsalhy
Edmonton Meadowlark	Raj Sherman; 6,174 (54.83%)	Debbie Cavaliere; 3,423 (30.40%)	Pascal Ryffel; 1,010 (8.97%)	Richard Guyon; 306 (2.72%)	Amanda Doyle; 347 (3.08%)		Maurice Tougas
Edmonton-Whitemud	David Hancock; 12,054 (58.47%)	Nancy Cavanaugh; 6,997 (33.94%)	Hana Razga; 1,023 (4.96%)		Valerie Kennedy; 543 (2.63%)		**David Hancock**
Sherwood Park	Iris Evans; 9,312 (63.14%)	Louise Rogers; 3,843 (26.06%)	Katharine Hay; 904 (6.13%)		Rick Hoines; 689 (4.67%)		**Iris Evans**
Spruce Grove-Sturgeon-St. Albert	Doug Horner; 9,369 (60.83%)	Ray Boudreau; 4,528 (29.40%)	Peter Cross; 960 (6.23%)		Allan West; 545 (3.54%)		**Doug Horner**
St. Albert	Ken Allred; 8,403 (54.09%)	Jack Flaherty; 5,598 (36.03%)	Katy Campbell; 959 (6.17%)		Ross Vincent; 576 (3.71%)		Jack Flaherty
Strathcona	Dave Quest; 9,951 (66.19%)	Jon Friel; 2,995 (19.92%)	Denny Holmwood; 911 (6.06%)		Kate Harrington; 763 (5.07%)	Gordon Barrett (SC); 415 (2.76%)	Rob Lougheed

=== Southern Alberta ===
Electoral district	Candidates						Incumbent
Electoral district	PC	Liberal	NDP	Wildrose Alliance	Greens	Other	Incumbent
Airdrie-Chestermere	Rob Anderson; 9,374 (62.58%)	John Burke; 1,973 (13.17%)	Bryan Young; 609 (4.07%)	Jeff Willerton; 2,362 (15.77%)	David Brandreth; 660 (4.41%)		Carol Haley
Cardston-Taber-Warner	Broyce Jacobs; 4,374 (46.02%)	Ron Hancock; 436 (4.59%)	Suzanne Sirias; 190 (2.00%)	**Paul Hinman**; 4,325 (45.50%)	Billy Turner; 180 (1.89%)		**Paul Hinman**
Cypress-Medicine Hat	Leonard Mitzel; 5,640 (63.34%)	Dick Mastel; 2,023 (22.72%)	Manuel Martinez; 347 (3.90%)	Dan Pierson; 679 (7.63%)	Bright Pride; 215 (2.41%)		Leonard Mitzel
Highwood	George Groeneveld; 7,715 (65.11%)	Stan Shedd; 1,647 (13.90%)	Carolyn Boulton; 391 (3.30%)	Daniel Doherty; 1,405 (11.86%)	John Barret; 691 (5.83%)		George Groeneveld
Lethbridge East	Jason Herasemluk; 4,715 (39.21%)	Bridget Pastoor; 5,582 (46.42%)	Tom Moffatt; 687 (5.71%)	Grant Shaw; 748 (6.22%)	Helen McMenamin; 292 (2.44%)		Bridget Pastoor
Lethbridge West	Greg Weadick; 5,002 (43.68%)	Bal Boora; 4,022 (35.13%)	James Moore; 1,179 (10.30%)	Matt Fox; 855 (7.47%)	Brennan Tilley; 392 (3.42%)		**Clint Dunford**
Little Bow	Barry McFarland; 5,150 (58.06%)	Everett Tanis; 1,080 (12.18%)	Duane Petluk; 322 (3.63%)	Kevin Kinahan; 2,051 (23.12%)	Marie Read; 267 (3.01%)		**Barry McFarland**
Livingstone-Macleod	Evan Berger; 6,037 (64.18%)	Mike Judd; 1,534 (16.31%)	Phil Burpee; 476 (5.06%)	Jack Macleod; 988 (10.50%)	Bryan Hunt; 371 (3.95%)		**David Coutts**
Medicine Hat	Rob Renner; 5,388 (51.18%)	Karen Charlton; 3,625 (34.43%)	Diana Arnott; 484 (4.60%)	Clint Rabb; 746 (7.08%)	Karen Kraus; 285 (2.71%)		Rob Renner
Strathmore-Brooks	Arno Doerksen; 7,623 (74.55%)	Gerry Hart; 991 (9.69%)	Brian Stokes; 313 (3.06%)	Amanda Shehata; 935 (9.14%)	Chris Bayford; 362 (3.55%)		Lyle Oberg

=== Suburban Calgary ===
Electoral district	Candidates						Incumbent
Electoral district	PC	Liberal	NDP	Wildrose Alliance	Greens	Other	Incumbent
Calgary-Bow	Alana DeLong; 6,687 (45.16%)	Greg Flanagan; 5,173 (34.93%)	Teale Phelps Bondaroff; 507 (3.42%)	Barry Holizki; 1,425 (9.62%)	Randy Weeks; 845 (5.71%)	**Len Skowronski** (SC); 171 (1.16%)	Alana DeLong
Calgary-Cross	Yvonne Fritz; 4,004 (56.82%)	Rob Reinhold; 1,567 (22.24%)	Shelina Hassanali; 476 (6.75%)	Gordon Huth; 605 (8.59%)	Susan Stratton; 395 (5.60%)		**Yvonne Fritz**
Calgary-Foothills	Len Webber; 6,088 (48.20%)	Mike Robinson; 4,909 (38.86%)	Stephanie Sundburg; 251 (1.99%)	Kevin Legare; 972 (7.70%)	Ian Groll; 411 (3.25%)		Len Webber
Calgary-Fort	Wayne Cao; 4,123 (49.81%)	Carole Oliver; 1,770 (21.39%)	Julie Hrdlicka; 1,178 (14.23%)	Travis Chase; 715 (8.64%)	J. Mark Taylor; 491 (5.93%)		Wayne Cao
Calgary-Hays	Arthur Johnston; 6,968 (54.23%)	Bill Kurtze; 3,586 (27.91%)	Tyler Kinch; 366 (2.84%)	Devin Cassidy; 1,366 (10.63%)	Keeley Bruce; 564 (4.39%)		Arthur Johnston
Calgary-Lougheed	David Rodney; 7,190 (52.51%)	Lori Czerwinski; 3,926 (28.68%)	Clint Marko; 336 (2.45%)	Derrick Jacobson; 1,620 (11.83%)	Bernie Amell; 520 (3.80%)	Gordon Laurie (Ind.); 100 (0.73%)	David Rodney
Calgary-Mackay	Teresa Woo-Paw; 6,247 (48.40%)	Tianna Melnyk; 4,048 (31.36%)	Daena Diduck; 426 (3.30%)	Rob Gregory; 1,609 (12.46%)	Ryan Smith; 578 (4.48%)		Vacant
Calgary-McCall	Shiraz Shariff; 4,161 (43.16%)	Darshan Kang; 4,279 (44.38%)	Preet Sihota; 275 (2.85%)	Ina Given; 542 (5.62%)	Heather Brocklesby; 385 (3.99%)		Shiraz Shariff
Calgary-Montrose	Manmeet Bhullar; 2,627 (34.45%)	Michael Embaie; 1,396 (18.31%)	Al Brown; 512 (6.71%)	Said Abdulbaki; 818 (10.73%)	Fred Clemens; 262 (3.44%)	Ron Leech (Ind); 2,010 (26.36%)	Hung Pham
Calgary-North West	Lindsay Blackett; 8,415 (46,21%)	Dale Martin D'Silva; 5,552 (30.49%)	Colin Anderson; 637 (3.50%)	Chris Jukes; 2,703 (14.85%)	**George Read**; 902 (4.95%)		**Greg Melchin**
Calgary-Shaw	Cindy Ady; 7,010 (58.12%)	John Roggeveen; 2,958 (24.53%)	Jenn Carlson; 334 (2.77%)	Richard P. Dur; 1,268 (10.51%)	Jennifer Oss-Saunders; 491 (4.07%_		Cindy Ady
Calgary-West	Ron Liepert; 8,428 (47.97%)	Beth Gignac; 5,693 (32.41%)	Chantelle Dubois; 401 (2.28%)	Bob Babcock; 2,273 (12.94%)	James Kohut; 773 (4.40%)		Ron Liepert

=== Central Calgary ===
Electoral district	Candidates						Incumbent
Electoral district	PC	Liberal	NDP	Wildrose Alliance	Greens	Other	Incumbent
Calgary-Buffalo	Sean Chu; 3,646 (38.85%)	Kent Hehr; 4,583 (48.83%)	Robert Lawrence; 387 (4.12%)		Stephen Ricketts; 611 (6.51%)	Antoni Grochowski (SC); 158 (1.69%)	**Harvey Cenaiko**
Calgary-Currie	Arthur Kent; 4,552 (37.27%)	Dave Taylor; 5,564 (45.56%)	Marc Power; 531 (4.35%)	Ken Mazeroll; 670 (5.49%)	Graham MacKenzie; 896 (7.34%)		Dave Taylor
Calgary-East	Moe Amery; 4,583 (53.85%)	Bill Harvey; 2,433 (28.59%)	Christopher Dovey; 425 (4.99%)	Mike McCraken; 681 (8.00%)	Ross Cameron; 333 (3.91%)	Bonnie Collins (Com); 55 (0.66%)	Moe Amery
Calgary-Egmont	Jonathan Denis; 5,415 (43.61%)	Cathie Williams; 3,289 (26.49%)	Jason Nishiyama; 447 (3.60%)	Barry Chase; 676 (5.44%)	Mark McGillvray; 582 (4.69%)	Craig Chandler (Ind.); 2,008 (16.17%)	**Denis Herard**
Calgary-Elbow	Alison Redford; 6,130 (42.08%)	Craig Cheffins; 5,711 (39.20%)	Garnet Wilcox; 290 (1.99%)	Dale Nelson; 963 (6.61%)	Jonathon Sheffield; 526 (3.61%)	Barry Erskine (Ind); 948 (6.51%)	Craig Cheffins
Calgary-Fish Creek	Heather Forsyth; 6,884 (52.30%)	Laura Shutiak; 4,038 (30.68%)	Eric Leavitt; 423 (3.22%)	Jamie Buchan; 1,261 (9.58%)	Kerry Fraser; 556 (4.22%)		**Heather Forsyth**
Calgary-Glenmore	Ron Stevens; 6,436 (50.67%)	Avalon Roberts; 4,213 (33.17%)	Holly Heffernan; 477 (3.76%)	Ryan Sadler; 1,025 (8.07%)	Arden Bonokoski; 550 (4.33%)		**Ron Stevens**
Calgary-Mountain View	Leah Lawrence; 4,252 (30.91%)	David Swann; 7,086 (51.51%)	John Donovan; 661 (4.81%)	Cory Morgan; 892 (6.48%)	Juliet Burgess; 865 (6.29%)		David Swann
Calgary-North Hill	Kyle Fawcett; 4,281 (38.22%)	Pat Murray; 3,573 (31.99%)	John Chan; 1,381 (12.36%)	Jane Morgan; 976 (8.74%)	Kevin Maloney; 732 (6.55%)	Jim Wright (SC); 228 (2.04%)	Richard Magnus
Calgary-Nose Hill	Neil Brown; 4,586 (49.24%)	Len Borowski; 2,761 (29.65%)	Tristan Ridley; 388 (4.17%)	John Murdoch; 954 (10.24%)	Nick Burman; 624 (6.70%)		Neil Brown
Calgary-Varsity	Jennifer Diakiw; 5,353 (36.69%)	Harry B. Chase; 6,907 (47.33%)	Tim Stock-Bateman; 530 (3.63%)	Brennan Ltyle; 1,043 (7.15%)	Sean Maw; 758 (5.19%)		Harry B. Chase
