= Paul Hinman =

Canadian politician (born 1959)

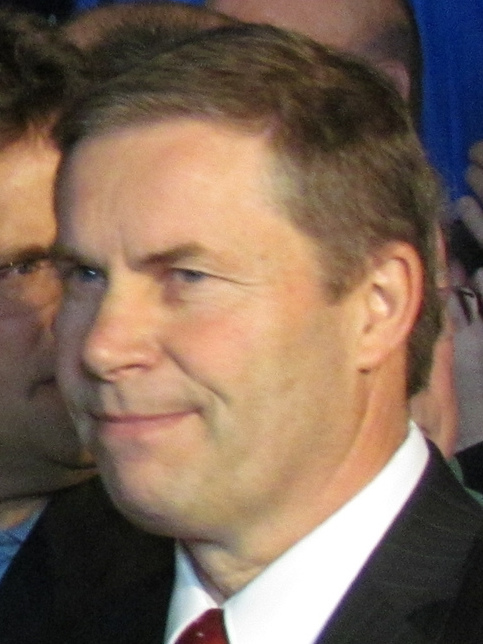
- Hinman in 2012

Leader of the Wildrose Loyalty Coalition
- Incumbent
- Assumed office May 1, 2023

Leader of the Wildrose Independence Party of Alberta
- In office July 17, 2020 – October 21, 2022
- Preceded by: David White (as interim leader of the Freedom Conservative Party of Alberta)
- Succeeded by: Jeevan Mangat (interim)

Leader of the Wildrose Party
- In office January 31, 2008 – October 17, 2009
- Preceded by: Himself (as leader of the Alberta Alliance Party)
- Succeeded by: Danielle Smith

Leader of the Alberta Alliance Party
- In office November 19, 2005 – January 31, 2008
- Preceded by: Eleanor Maroes (interim)
- Succeeded by: Himself (as leader of the Wildrose Party)
Parliamentary constituencies
Member of the Legislative Assembly of Alberta
In office September 14, 2009 – April 23, 2012
Preceded by	Ron Stevens
Succeeded by	Linda Johnson
Constituency	Calgary-Glenmore
In office November 22, 2004 – March 3, 2008
Preceded by	Broyce Jacobs
Succeeded by	Broyce Jacobs
Constituency	Cardston-Taber-Warner

Personal details
- Born: 1959 (age 66–67) Edmonton, Alberta, Canada
- Party: Wildrose Loyalty Coalition
- Other political affiliations: Alberta Alliance (2002–2008); Wildrose (2008–2017); United Conservative (2017–2020); Wildrose Independence (2020–2022)
- Children: Mark, Jordan, Tanner, Janna
- Education: University of Alberta

Paul Hinman (born 1959) is a Canadian politician and businessman who is currently the leader of the Wildrose Loyalty Coalition. He was the leader of the Wildrose Independence Party of Alberta from 2020 to 2022, and was the leader of the Wildrose Alliance (2008–2009) and Alberta Alliance Party (2005–2008). He served two terms as a member of the Legislative Assembly of Alberta, from 2004 to 2008 representing the electoral district of Cardston-Taber-Warner and then from 2009 to 2012 in Calgary-Glenmore.

== Early life ==
Hinman was born in Edmonton in 1959. He grew up in Calgary in the neighbourhood of Haysboro. As of 2022, Hinman lives in the town of Raymond, Alberta.

Hinman's grandfather Edgar "Ted" Hinman was a Member of the Legislative Assembly for Cardston and as Provincial Treasurer in the Social Credit government under Ernest Manning.

Before politics, Hinman was an irrigation farmer, cow-calf producer, purebred-cattle breeder, feedlot operator and small-business entrepreneur. He attended the University of Alberta Faculty of Pharmacy.

Hinman is a libertarian, telling Calgary Herald columnist Don Braid in 2009 "I'm all about sharing ideas and inspiring others, not requiring others to do things. It's just so necessary for peace and prosperity to flourish. If people impose their will on others, it's just wrong."

He is a member of the Church of Jesus Christ of Latter-day Saints. He spent two years in the Philippines serving as a Mormon Missionary and learned to speak Tagalog. He described a divorce he went through as a painful and difficult trial in his faith that he overcame. He remains an active Mormon and still holds to its values.

== Political career ==
Hinman worked for the Reform Party of Canada in policy and election committees. He later worked for the Conservative Party of Canada. He served as a board member for the federal Conservative Party of Canada in the electoral district of Lethbridge.

In provincial politics, he was the southern regional director for the Alberta First Party. Hinman served as vice-president of policy for the Alberta Alliance Party from its founding convention on February 14, 2002, until he was named deputy leader on January 8, 2005.

=== Alberta Alliance Party ===
==== MLA of Cardston-Taber-Warner ====
As a candidate for the Alberta Alliance Party, Hinman was elected to his first term as the Member of the Legislative Assembly (MLA) representing the constituency of Cardston-Taber-Warner in the 2004 provincial election on November 22, 2004. He defeated incumbent Broyce Jacobs the Progressive Conservatives candidate by 129 votes. Hinman was the only Alberta Alliance Party candidate elected in 2004.

==== Leadership election ====
After the 2004 provincial election, former Alberta Alliance leader Randy Thorsteinson stepped down as leader of the party.

Hinman was one of four candidates who ran in the 2005 Alberta Alliance Party leadership election. The other three candidates were Ed Klop, Marilyn Burns and David Crutcher.

Hinman won the election on the third ballot at the leadership convention held on November 19, 2005, in Red Deer, Alberta.

=== Wildrose Alliance ===
Under Hinman's leadership, the Alberta Alliance and the Wildrose Party of Alberta merged to unite the right wing of the political spectrum in Alberta at a convention held on January 19, 2008, in Calgary.

In the 2008 provincial election, Hinman lost to Jacobs by 39 votes after three recounts. However, the party increased its vote in the riding. The party also gained popular vote in most of the other ridings where it ran candidates, but did not win any seats.

A year later, Hinman stepped down as leader of the Wildrose Alliance Party, triggering a leadership convention in October 2009 in Edmonton. Hinman remained interim leader of the Alliance until the election of Danielle Smith as party leader on October 17.

==== Calgary-Glenmore by-election ====
On May 15, 2009, Calgary-Glenmore MLA Ron Stevens announced his resignation to accept a position as a judge. Hinman ran in the ensuing by-election Hinman was selected as the Wildrose Alliance candidate and won the by-election with 37% of the vote.

==== Endorsement of Jason Kenney's UCP leadership campaign ====
On September 8, 2017, Danielle Smith of NewsTalk770 and Hinman's successor as Wildrose leader announced that Hinman would be running for the leadership of the newly formed United Conservative Party (UCP). However, Hinman later declined to run and posted to his Twitter that he was endorsing Jason Kenney.

In December 2021, he told Fort McMurray Today that he was no longer a supporter of Kenney or the UCP, and that "Jason Kenney and the UCP have betrayed us by not standing up to Ottawa."

=== Wildrose Independence Party ===
Hinman was made interim leader of the Wildrose Independence Party of Alberta in July 2020 and elected leader in 2021. The party campaigns on Alberta separatism. It has no connection with the former Wildrose Party that merged with the Progressive Conservative Association of Alberta to create the United Conservative Party.

Following Jason Kenney's announcement on May 17, 2022, that he would be resigning as premier of Alberta, Hinman was rumoured to be interested in running for leadership of the UCP. Hinman said he had no interest in leading the party and said the UCP's divisions that led to Kenney's resignation would help the Wildrose Independence Party with recruitment.

==== Fort McMurray-Lac La Biche by-election ====
Hinman ran in the 2022 Fort McMurray-Lac La Biche by-election. Hinman was not a resident of the Fort McMurray or Lac La Biche regions, but denied he was an opportunist or ignorant of local issues facing the riding.

He told Fort McMurray Today he was running as a candidate because he felt it was “the most important election in Alberta’s near-term history." He said he had stopped supporting Kenney and the UCP because he felt "Jason Kenney and the UCP have betrayed us by not standing up to Ottawa."

Hinman finished third in the by-election, behind NDP candidate Ariana Mancini and UCP MLA Brian Jean.

==== Leadership struggles and disputes with the board ====
After the Fort McMurray-Lac La Biche by-election, the party began a review of Hinman's leadership and his performance in the by-election. After the review concluded, he was removed as party leader on June 28, 2022.

The review accused Hinman of paying himself with party money during the by-election. The review also wrote that Hinman was not familiar with the needs and concerns shared by people living in the riding, despite his commentary on community issues at local forums and in interviews with Harvard Media's CFVR-FM and Fort McMurray Today. The review was not released publicly, but a copy was leaked to the Western Standard.

Hinman denied all of the party's accusations against him. He told CTV News that the party was being taken over by "implants, plants, agents inside our board" who are opposed to an independent Alberta. Hinman was reinstated as leader during the party's annual general meeting in Red Deer on July 23, 2022. The party's board of governors was forced out.

A Court of King's Bench justice ruled on October 21 that Hinman had been legally removed as leader of the party and that the interim party leader was Jeevan Mangat. Hinman is appealing the decision. The party's board also accused Hinman and his supporters of disrupting the AGM and pressuring people to either leave or support Hinman. They are suing Hinman for $180,000.

Hinman told the Medicine Hat News he is focusing on his legal battles with the party's leadership and would not be running in the Brooks-Medicine Hat by-election.

=== Wildrose Loyalty Coalition ===
After being removed as leader of the Wildrose Independence Party, Hinman formed a new party called the Wildrose Loyalty Coalition in early 2023. It became a registered party with Elections Alberta on May 1, 2023.

== Electoral record ==
=== 2023 general election ===
2023 Alberta general election: Taber-Warner
Party	Candidate	Votes	%	±%
United Conservative	Grant Hunter	12,379	75.29	-2.83
New Democratic	Jazminn Hintz	2,817	17.13	+4.24
Wildrose Loyalty Coalition	Paul Hinman	754	4.59	–
Green	Joel Hunt	239	1.45	–
Alberta Independence	Frank Kast	129	0.78	–
Solidarity Movement	Brent Ginther	124	0.75	–
Total		16,442	99.52	–
Rejected and declined		79	0.48	
Turnout		16,521	56.30	
Eligible voters		29,344		
United Conservative hold		Swing		-3.54
Source(s) Source: Elections Alberta

=== 2022 by-election ===
Alberta provincial by-election, 15 March 2022: Fort McMurray-Lac La Biche
Party	Candidate	Votes	%	±%
United Conservative	Brian Jean	3,717	63.64	-2.69
New Democratic	Ariana Mancini	1,081	18.51	-6.01
Wildrose Independence	Paul Hinman	628	10.75	–
Liberal	Abdulhakim Hussein	211	3.61	–
Alberta Party	Michelle Landsiedel	98	1.68	-4.10
Independent	Brian Deheer	57	0.98	–0.58
Alberta Advantage Party	Marilyn Burns	25	0.43	–
Alberta Independence	Steven Mellott	24	0.41	-1.42
Total valid votes		5,841	99.39	
Total rejected ballots		36	0.61	-0.02
Turnout		5,877	23.99	-34.26
Eligible voters		24,501		
United Conservative hold		Swing		+1.66

=== 2012 general election ===
2012 Alberta general election: Calgary-Glenmore
Party	Candidate	Votes	%	±%
Progressive Conservative	Linda Johnson	9,710	47.93%	22.03%
Wildrose	Paul Hinman	7,902	39.01%	2.14%
Liberal	Dan MacAuley	1,437	7.09%	-27.15%
New Democratic	Rick Collier	1,208	5.96%	4.62%
Total		20,257	–	–
Rejected, spoiled and declined		144	32	11
Eligible electors / turnout		34,592	59.01%	19.86%
Progressive Conservative gain from Wildrose		Swing		-4.29%
Source(s) Source: "13 - Calgary-Glenmore, 2012 Alberta general election". officialresults.elections.ab.ca. Elections Alberta.

=== 2009 by-election ===
Alberta provincial by-election, September 14, 2009: Calgary-Glenmore
Party	Candidate	Votes	%	±%
Wildrose Alliance	Paul Hinman	4,052	36.87%	28.80%
Liberal	Avalon Roberts	3,774	34.34%	1.17%
Progressive Conservative	Diane Colley-Urquhart	2,847	25.90%	−24.77%
New Democratic	Eric Carpendale	148	1.34%	−2.42%
Social Credit	Len Skowronski	99	0.90%	–
Independent	Antoni Grochowski	71	0.65%	–
Total		10,991	–	–
Rejected, spoiled and declined		29	5	1
Eligible electors / turnout		28,164	39.15%	-6.35%
Wildrose Alliance gain from Progressive Conservative		Swing		14.99
Source(s) Source: Chief Electoral Officer (November 20, 2009). Report on the September 14, 2009 Calgary-Glenmore By-Election. Edmonton: Elections Alberta. ISBN 0981120172.

=== 2008 general election ===
2008 Alberta general election: Cardston-Taber-Warner
Party	Candidate	Votes	%	±%
Progressive Conservative	Broyce Jacobs	4,374	46.02%	3.50%
Wildrose Alliance	Paul Hinman	4,325	45.50%	2.98%
Liberal	Ron Hancock	436	4.59%	-4.28%
New Democratic	Suzanne Sirias	190	2.00%	-0.10%
Green	William Turner	180	1.89%	-0.66%
Total		9,505	–	–
Rejected, spoiled and declined		14	–	–
Eligible electors / turnout		19,905	47.82%	1.15%
Progressive Conservative gain from Alberta Alliance		Swing		-0.47%
Source(s) Source: The Report on the March 3, 2008 Provincial General Election of the Twenty-seventh Legislative Assembly (PDF). Elections Alberta. July 28, 2008. pp. 386–391.

=== 2004 general election ===
2004 Alberta general election: Cardston-Taber-Warner
Party	Candidate	Votes	%	±%
Alberta Alliance	Paul Hinman	3,885	43.98%	–
Progressive Conservative	Broyce Jacobs	3,756	42.52%	-11.12%
Liberal	Paula Shimp	783	8.86%	-8.96%
Greens	Lindsay Ferguson	225	2.55%	–
New Democratic	Luann Bannister	185	2.09%	-0.35%
Total		8,834	–	–
Rejected, spoiled and declined		47	–	–
Eligible electors / turnout		19,030	46.67%	-6.44%
Alberta Alliance gain from Progressive Conservative		Swing		-13.04%
Source(s) Source: "Cardston-Taber-Warner Statement of Official Results 2004 Alberta general election" (PDF). Elections Alberta.
