= Cardston-Taber-Warner =

Defunct provincial electoral district in Alberta, Canada

Coordinates: 49.453°N 112.599°W

Alberta electoral district
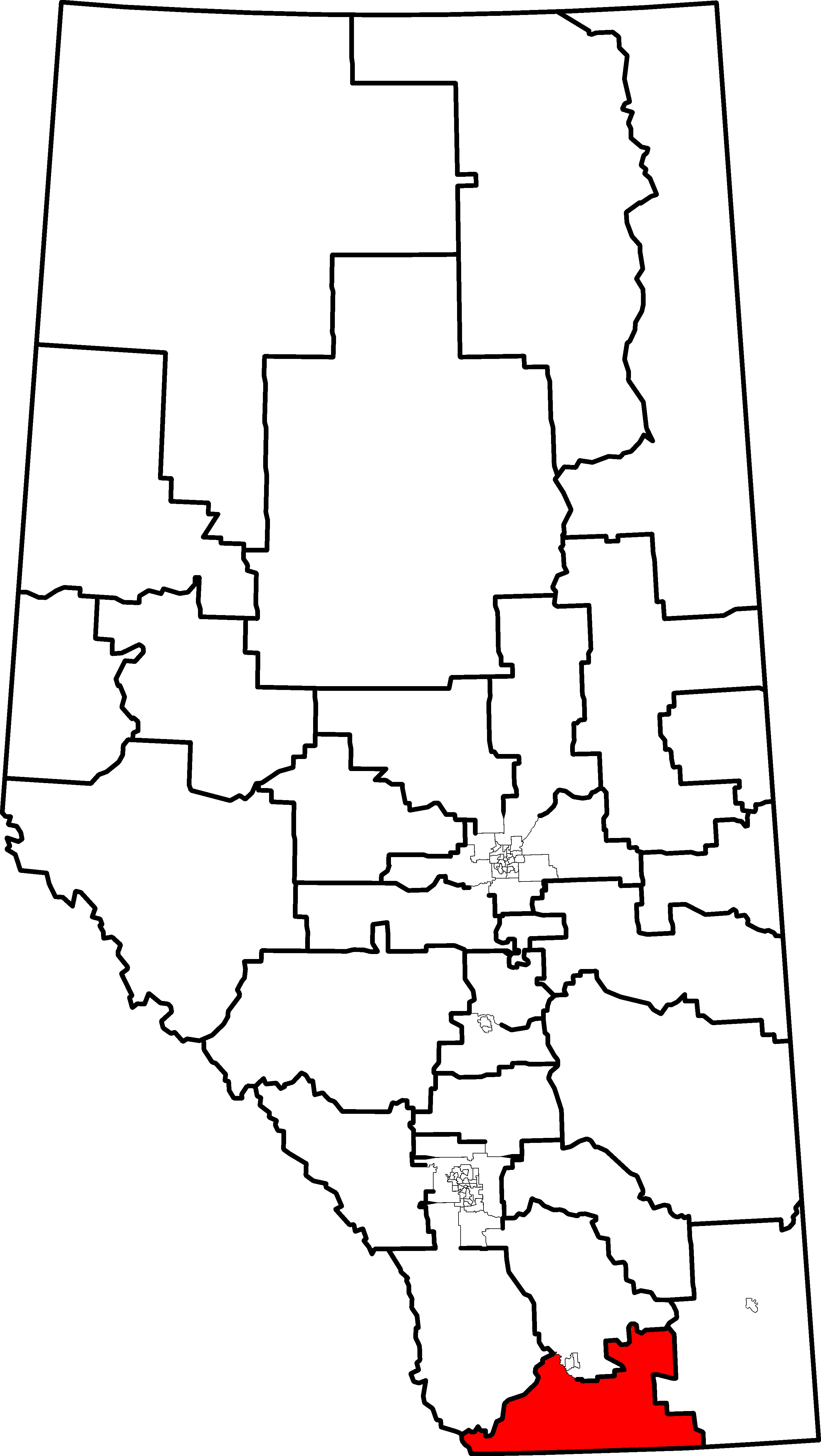
- 2010 boundaries

Defunct provincial electoral district
- Legislature: Legislative Assembly of Alberta
- District created: 1996
- District abolished: 2017
- First contested: 1997
- Last contested: 2015

Cardston-Taber-Warner was a provincial electoral district in Alberta, Canada, mandated to return a single member to the Legislative Assembly of Alberta using the first-past-the-post method of voting from 1996 to 2019.

The district was created in the 1996 boundary redistribution when Cardston-Chief Mountain and Taber-Warner were merged. The district comprises most of southern southwest Alberta on the Canada–United States border. It is mostly rural and contains a wide range of topography from Mountains to farmlands, including Waterton Lakes National Park and the Blood Reserve. Cardston-Taber-Warner and its antecedents have a long history that dates back to the old Cardston riding in the North-West Territories.

The district has been held by right of center parties since it was created in 1997, and has held the distinction of being one rural riding not continuously held by the Progressive Conservatives in Alberta before many were lost in the 2012 Alberta general election. The Progressive Conservatives elected Ron Hirath and then Broyce Jacobs and the Alberta Alliance captured the district in 2004 holding it for a term before Broyce Jacobs won it back in 2008. The Wildrose Party won the district when Gary Bikman won it in the 2012 Alberta general election, and regained the seat in the 2015 Alberta general election, months after Bikman crossed to the PC Party.

== History ==
The electoral district was created in the 1996 boundary re-distribution from the old ridings of Cardston-Chief Mountain and Taber-Warner.

The 2010 Alberta boundary re-distribution saw only one minor change made to the riding when the Blood Reserve was transferred to the district from Livingstone-Macleod.

The Cardston-Taber-Warner electoral district was dissolved in the 2017 electoral boundary re-distribution, and portions of the district would form the newly created Cardston-Siksika and Taber-Warner electoral districts.

=== Boundary history ===
49 Cardston-Taber-Warner 2003 boundaries
Bordering districts
North	East	West	South
Livingstone-Macleod and Little Bow	Cypress-Medicine Hat	British Columbia boundary	Montana boundary
riding map goes here			
Legal description from the Statutes of Alberta 2003, Electoral Divisions Act.
Starting at the intersection of the Alberta-British Columbia boundary and the north boundary of Waterton Lakes National Park; then 1. in a generally easterly direction along the north park boundary to the right bank of the Waterton River; 2. downstream in a northeast direction to the intersection with the Belly River and the Blood Indian Reserve No. 148; 3. along the west, south and east boundary of the Indian Reserve to its intersection with the right bank of Pothole Creek; 4. upstream along the right bank to the north boundary of Sec. 8 in Twp. 7, Rge. 21 W4; 5. east along the north boundary of Secs. 8, 9, 10 and 11 to the east boundary of Sec. 11 in the Twp.; 6. south along the east boundary to the north boundary of Sec. 1 in the Twp.; 7. east along the north boundary of Sec. 1 in the Twp. and the north boundary of Secs. 6, 5, 4, 3, 2 and 1 in Twp. 7, Rge. 20 W4 to the east boundary of Rge. 20 W4; 8. south along the east boundary to the north boundary of Twp. 6; 9. east along the north boundary to the east boundary of Sec. 6 in Twp. 7, Rge. 19 W4; 10. north along the east boundary of Secs. 6, 7 and 18 to the north boundary of Sec. 17 in the Twp.; 11. east along the north boundary of Secs. 17, 16, 15, 14 and 13 in Twp. 7, Rge. 19 W4 and Secs. 18, 17, 16 and 15 in Twp. 7, Rge. 18 W4 to the east boundary of Sec. 22 in the Twp.; 12. north along the east boundary of Secs. 22, 27 and 34 in the Twp. to the north boundary of Twp. 7; 13. east along the north boundary to the east boundary of Sec. 3 in Twp. 8, Rge. 17 W4; 14. north along the east boundary to the north boundary of the south half of Sec. 3 in the Twp.; 15. west along the north boundary of the south half of Sec. 3 to the east boundary of Sec. 4 in the Twp.; 16. north along the east boundary to the north boundary of Sec. 4 in the Twp.; 17. west along the north boundary to the east boundary of the west half of Sec. 9 in the Twp.; 18. north along the east boundary of the west half of Secs. 9 and 16 to the north boundary of the south half of Sec. 16 in the Twp.; 19. west along the north boundary to the east boundary of Sec. 17 in the Twp.; 20. north along the east boundary to the north boundary of Sec. 17 in the Twp.; 21. west along the north boundary to the east boundary of the west half of Sec. 20 in the Twp.; 22. north along the east boundary to the north boundary of the south half of Sec. 20 in the Twp.; 23. west along the north boundary of the south half of Secs. 20 and 19 to the east boundary of Rge. 18 W4; 24. north along the east boundary to the north boundary of Sec. 24 in Twp. 8, Rge. 18 W4; 25. west along the north boundary to the east boundary of Sec. 26 in the Twp.; 26. north along the east boundary to the north boundary of the south half of Sec. 26 in the Twp.; 27. west along the north boundary to the east boundary of the west half of Sec. 26 in the Twp.; 28. north along the east boundary to the north boundary of Sec. 26 in the Twp.; 29. west along the north boundary of Secs. 26 and 27 to the east boundary of the west half of Sec. 34 in the Twp.; 30. north along the east boundary to the north boundary of the south half of Sec. 34 in the Twp.; 31. west along the north boundary of the south half of Secs. 34 and 33 to the east boundary of Sec. 32 in the Twp.; 32. north along the east boundary to the north boundary of Twp. 8; 33. west along the north boundary to the east boundary of Sec. 6 in Twp. 9, Rge. 18 W4; 34. north along the east boundary of Sec. 6 to the north boundary of the south half of Sec. 6; 35. west along the north boundary of the south half to the east boundary of the west half of Sec. 6; 36. north along the east boundary of the west half of Secs. 6 and 7 to the north boundary of the south half of Sec. 7 in the Twp.; 37. west along the north boundary to the east boundary of Rge. 19 W4; 38. north along the east boundary to the right bank of the Oldman River; 39. downstream along the right bank of the Oldman River to the right bank of the South Saskatchewan River; 40. downstream along the right bank of the South Saskatchewan River to the east boundary of Rge. 13 W4; 41. south along the east boundary to the north boundary of the south half of Sec. 1 in Twp. 7, Rge. 13 W4; 42. west along the north boundary of the south half of Secs. 1 and 2 to the east boundary of Sec. 3 in the Twp.; 43. north along the east boundary to the north boundary of Sec. 3 in the Twp.; 44. west along the north boundary to the east boundary of Sec. 9 in the Twp.; 45. north along the east boundary to the north boundary of the south half of Sec. 9 in the Twp.; 46. west along the north boundary of the south half of Secs. 9, 8 and 7 in the Twp. to the east boundary of Rge. 14 W4; 47. north along the east boundary to the north boundary of Sec. 12 in Twp. 7, Rge. 14 W4; 48. west along the north boundary to the east boundary of Sec. 14 in the Twp.; 49. north along the east boundary to the north boundary of the south half of Sec. 14 in the Twp.; 50. west along the north boundary of the south half of Secs. 14 and 15 to the east boundary of Sec. 16 in the Twp.; 51. north along the east boundary to the north boundary of Sec. 16 in the Twp.; 52. west along the north boundary of Secs. 16, 17 and 18 in the Twp. to the east boundary of Rge. 15 W4; 53. south along the east boundary to the north boundary of Twp. 4; 54. east along the north boundary to the east boundary of Rge. 14 W4; 55. south along the east boundary to the north boundary of Twp. 3; 56. east along the north boundary to the east boundary of Sec. 32 in Twp. 3, Rge. 11 W4 (Highway 879); 57. south along the east boundary of Secs. 32, 29, 20, 17, 8 and 5 in the Twp. and the east boundary of Secs. 32, 29 and 20 in Twp. 2 to the right bank of the Milk River; 58. downstream along the right bank to the east boundary of Rge. 11 W4; 59. south along the east boundary to the south boundary of the province; 60. west along the south boundary to the Alberta-British Columbia boundary; 61. in a northwesterly direction to the starting point.
Note:

53 Cardston-Taber-Warner 2010 boundaries
Bordering districts
North	East	West	South
Lethbridge-West, Little Bow and Livingstone-Macleod	Cypress-Medicine Hat	British Columbia boundary	Montana boundary
Legal description from the Statutes of Alberta 2010, Electoral Divisions Act.

=== Electoral history ===
Members of the Legislative Assembly for Cardston-Taber-Warner
Assembly	Years	Member	Party
See Cardston-Chief Mountain 1993-1997 and Taber-Warner 1963-1997
24th	1997–2001	Ron Hierath	Progressive Conservative
25th	2001–2004	Broyce Jacobs	Progressive Conservative
26th	2004–2008	Paul Hinman	Alberta Alliance
26th	2008	Paul Hinman	Wildrose Alliance
27th	2008–2012	Broyce Jacobs	Progressive Conservative
28th	2012–2014	Gary Bikman	Wildrose
28th	2014–2015	Gary Bikman	Progressive Conservative
29th	2015–2017	Grant Hunter	Wildrose
29th	2017-2019	Grant Hunter	United Conservative
See Cardston-Siksika and Taber-Warner 2019-

Cardston-Taber-Warner was contested six times in general elections, each time changing its MLA. The first election held in 1997 saw Taber-Warner incumbent Ron Hierath run for his second term in office in the district. He ran against three other candidates taking 60% of the vote to pick up the new district for the Progressive Conservatives.

Hierath retired at dissolution in 2001. He was replaced by Progressive Conservative candidate Broyce Jacobs who the district easily over Alberta First Party leader John Reil who made a strong second place showing in the field of four candidates.

Jacobs stood for a second term in office in the 2004 general election but was defeated in a hotly contested race by Alberta Alliance candidate Paul Hinman. The Senate nominee election results also favored the Alberta Alliance well with the three Alliance candidates finishing in the top four spots.

Hinman became leader of the Alberta Alliance in 2005. He would lead his party to a merger with the unregistered Wildrose Party headed by party President Link Byfield on January 19, 2008. However Hinman would be defeated by Jacobs in the 2008 election held just weeks after his party merger.

Jacobs would be forced into retirement in the run up to the 2012 election after he lost his party nomination meeting to Pat Shimbashi. The general election saw the Wildrose party reclaim the district with candidate Gary Bikman defeating Shimbashi by a wide margin to earn his first term in office. Bikman subsequently crossed the floor to the PCs in 2014.

Wildrose re-gained the riding in 2015, with Grant Hunter becoming its last MLA. He also crossed the floor, joining the United Conservative Party when the PCs and Wildrose decided to merge in 2017.

== Legislative election results ==
=== 1997 ===
1997 Alberta general election
Party	Candidate	Votes	%	±%
Progressive Conservative	Ron Hierath	5,157	59.18%	–
Social Credit	Ken Rose	1,568	17.99%	–
Liberal	James Jackson	1,471	16.88%	–
New Democratic	Suzanne Sirias	518	5.94%	–
Total		8,714	–	–
Rejected, spoiled and declined		18	–	–
Eligible electors / turnout		17,741	49.22%	–
Progressive Conservative pickup new district.				
Source(s) Source: "Cardston-Taber-Warner Official Results 1997 Alberta general election". Alberta Heritage Community Foundation.

=== 2001 ===
2001 Alberta general election
Party	Candidate	Votes	%	±%
Progressive Conservative	Broyce Jacobs	5,256	53.63%	−5.55%
Alberta First	John Reil	2,557	26.09%	–
Liberal	Ron Hancock	1,747	17.83%	0.95%
New Democratic	Suzanne Sirias	240	2.45%	−3.50%
Total		9,800	–	–
Rejected, spoiled and declined		21	–	–
Eligible electors / turnout		18,470	53.17%	–
Progressive Conservative hold		Swing		−15.82%
Source(s) Source: "Cardston-Taber-Warner Official Results 2001 Alberta general election" (PDF). Elections Alberta.

=== 2004 ===
2004 Alberta general election
Party	Candidate	Votes	%	±%
Alberta Alliance	Paul Hinman	3,885	43.98%	–
Progressive Conservative	Broyce Jacobs	3,756	42.52%	-11.12%
Liberal	Paula Shimp	783	8.86%	-8.96%
Greens	Lindsay Ferguson	225	2.55%	–
New Democratic	Luann Bannister	185	2.09%	-0.35%
Total		8,834	–	–
Rejected, spoiled and declined		47	–	–
Eligible electors / turnout		19,030	46.67%	-6.44%
Alberta Alliance gain from Progressive Conservative		Swing		-13.04%
Source(s) Source: "Cardston-Taber-Warner Statement of Official Results 2004 Alberta general election" (PDF). Elections Alberta.

=== 2008 ===
2008 Alberta general election
Party	Candidate	Votes	%	±%
Progressive Conservative	Broyce Jacobs	4,374	46.02%	3.50%
Wildrose Alliance	Paul Hinman	4,325	45.50%	2.98%
Liberal	Ron Hancock	436	4.59%	-4.28%
New Democratic	Suzanne Sirias	190	2.00%	-0.10%
Green	William Turner	180	1.89%	-0.66%
Total		9,505	–	–
Rejected, spoiled and declined		14	–	–
Eligible electors / turnout		19,905	47.82%	1.15%
Progressive Conservative gain from Alberta Alliance		Swing		-0.47%
Source(s) Source: The Report on the March 3, 2008 Provincial General Election of the Twenty-seventh Legislative Assembly (PDF). Elections Alberta. July 28, 2008. pp. 386–391.

=== 2012 ===
2012 Alberta general election
Party	Candidate	Votes	%	±%
Wildrose	Gary Bikman	6,116	54.57%	9.07%
Progressive Conservative	Patrick Shimbashi	4,269	38.09%	-7.93%
New Democratic	Aaron Haugen	482	4.30%	2.30%
Liberal	Helen McMenamin	341	3.04%	-1.54%
Total		11,208	–	–
Rejected, spoiled and declined		54	–	–
Eligible electors / turnout		24,845	45.33%	-2.49%
Wildrose gain from Progressive Conservative		Swing		7.98%
Source(s) Source: "53 - Cardston-Taber-Warner Official Results 2012 Alberta general election". officialresults.elections.ab.ca. Elections Alberta.

=== 2015 ===
2015 Alberta general election
Party	Candidate	Votes	%	±%
Wildrose	Grant Hunter	5,126	41.79%	-12.78%
Progressive Conservative	Brian Brewin	4,356	35.51%	-2.58%
New Democratic	Aaron Haugen	2,407	19.62%	15.32%
Alberta Party	Delbert Bodnarek	378	3.08%	–
Total		12,267	–	–
Rejected, spoiled and declined		18	–	–
Eligible electors / turnout		23,918	51.36%	6.03%
Wildrose hold		Swing		-5.10%
Source(s) Source: "53 - Cardston-Taber-Warner Official Results 2015 Alberta general election". officialresults.elections.ab.ca. Elections Alberta.

== Senate nominee election results ==
=== 2004 ===
2004 Alberta Senate nominee election results: Cardston-Taber-Warner				Turnout 46.43%	
Affiliation	Candidate	Votes	% votes	% ballots	Rank
Alberta Alliance	Vance Gough	3,672	15.58%	46.75%	8
Progressive Conservative	Bert Brown	3,076	13.05%	39.16%	1
Alberta Alliance	Michael Roth	2,961	12.56%	37.70%	7
Alberta Alliance	Gary Horan	2,775	11.77%	35.33%	10
Progressive Conservative	Betty Unger	2,407	10.21%	30.64%	2
Independent	Link Byfield	2,263	9.60%	28.81%	4
Progressive Conservative	Cliff Breitkreuz	1,732	7.35%	22.05%	3
Progressive Conservative	David Usherwood	1,649	7.00%	20.99%	6
Progressive Conservative	Jim Silye	1,639	6.95%	20.87%	5
Independent	Tom Sindlinger	1,395	5.93%	17.76%	9
Total votes		23,569	100%		
Total ballots		7,855	3.00 votes per ballot		
Rejected, spoiled and declined		980			

Voters had the option of selecting four candidates on the ballot

== Student vote results ==
=== 2004 ===
Participating schools
Glenwood School
Magrath Junior Senior High School
Raymond Jr. High School
St. Marys School
Taber Christian School
Tween Valley Christian School
W.R. Myers High School

On November 19, 2004, a student vote was conducted at participating Alberta schools to parallel the 2004 Alberta general election results. The vote was designed to educate students and simulate the electoral process for persons who have not yet reached the legal majority. The vote was conducted in 80 of the 83 provincial electoral districts with students voting for actual election candidates. Schools with a large student body that reside in another electoral district had the option to vote for candidates outside of the electoral district then where they were physically located.

2004 Alberta student vote results
Affiliation	Candidate	Votes	%
Alberta Alliance	Paul Hinman	382	38.90%
Progressive Conservative	Broyce Jacobs	367	37.37%
Green	Lindsay Ferguson	103	10.49%
New Democratic	Luann Bannister	73	7.43%
Liberal	Paula Shimp	57	5.81%
Total		982	100%
Rejected, spoiled and declined		46	

=== 2012 ===
2012 Alberta student vote results
Affiliation	Candidate	Votes	%
Progressive Conservative	Pat Shimbashi	4270	%
Wildrose	Gary Bikman	6111	%
Liberal	Helen McNenamin	341	%
New Democratic	Aaron Haugen	482	%
Social Credit			%
Total			100%

== See also ==
- List of Alberta provincial electoral districts
- Canadian provincial electoral districts
