= D'Silva =

D'Silva is an Indian surname with Portuguese roots, prominently found in costal regions such as Goa, Karnataka (Mangalore) and some regions of Kerala. Notable people with the surname include:

- Carl D'Silva (died 2015), Indian wildlife artist and naturalist
- Amancio D'Silva (1936–1996), Indian jazz guitarist and composer
- Dale Martin D'Silva, Alberta Liberal Party candidate in 2008
- Darrell D'Silva (born 1964), British film and theatre actor
- John D'Silva, Indian Konkani actor and stage actor
- Rensil D'Silva, Indian film director, screenplay writer, creative director
- Robert D'Silva (1925–2015), Pakistani Roman Catholic priest
- Selma D'Silva (born 1960), player for the Indian Women's Hockey Team
- Shilton D'Silva (born 1992), Indian professional footballer

== See also ==
- Silva
