= Grant Hunter =

Canadian politician

The Honourable Grant Hunter ECA MLA
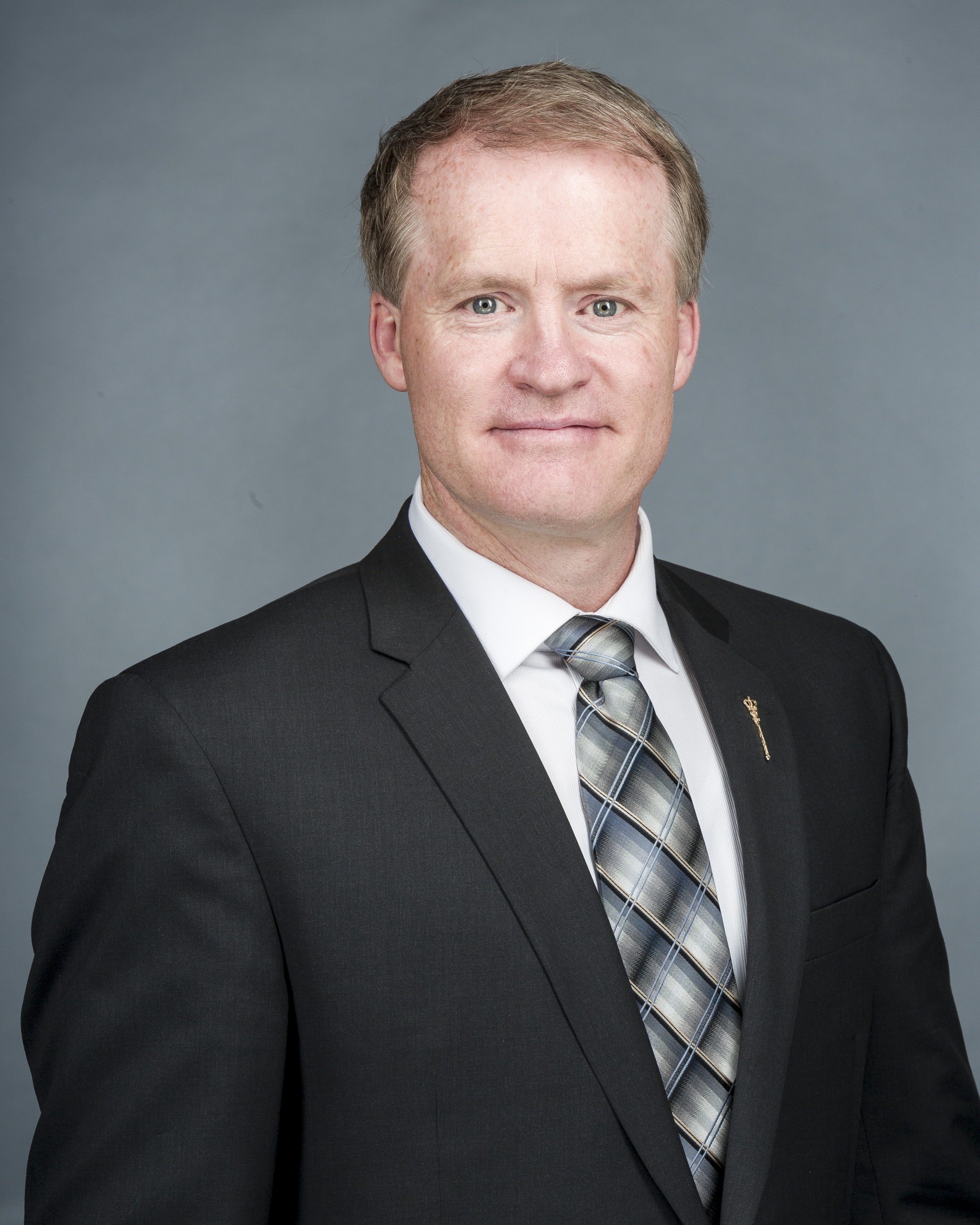

Member of the Legislative Assembly of Alberta for Taber-Warner Cardston-Taber-Warner (2015–2019)
- Incumbent
- Assumed office May 5, 2015
- Preceded by: Gary Bikman

Personal details
- Born: November 9, 1967 (age 58)
- Party: United Conservative
- Other political affiliations: Wildrose (2015–17)
- Education: Brigham Young University (BS) Northcentral University (master)
- Occupation: Businessman

Grant Roy Hunter ECA MLA (born November 9, 1967) is a Canadian politician who was elected in the 2015 and 2019 Alberta general elections to represent the electoral districts of Cardston-Taber-Warner and Taber-Warner in the 29th and 30th Alberta Legislature, respectively.

== Before Politics ==
Hunter has owned and operated his own commercial/residential construction company for over two decades. He holds a Bachelor of Science degree in economics and political science and a Master of Business Administration degree.

== Political career ==
=== In opposition ===
Hunter was elected in the 2015 Alberta general election, initially with the Wildrose. Hunter served in the opposition as Shadow Minister for Transportation and Technology, Shadow Minister for Jobs, Skills, Training, Labour and Red Tape Reduction, along with being the critic for Labour.

=== 2019 to Present ===
After the 2019 Alberta general election, Hunter was made Associate Minister of Red Tape Reduction for the new United Conservative government, a position which he held from April 30, 2019, to July 7, 2021.

In January 2021, with Hunter as Associate Minister, the Canadian Federation of Independent Business upgraded Alberta to an A from the previous B-minus grade for red tape. It was the first time in the 11-year history of the CFIB red tape report card that Alberta had earned an A-grade. CFIB estimates that between May 1, 2019, and June 30, 2020, Alberta’s government cut red tape by more than six per cent. The CFIB also awarded Hunter with the 2020 Golden Scissors Award for cutting red tape. He became Minister of Environment and Protected Areas in January 2026.

== Personal life ==
He resides in Taber, Alberta with his wife, Angie, and has five children and seven grandchildren. Hunter is a member of The Church of Jesus Christ of Latter-day Saints.

== Electoral record ==
=== 2023 general election ===
2023 Alberta general election: Taber-Warner
| Party | Candidate | Votes | % | ±% |
|---|---|---|---|---|
| United Conservative | Grant Hunter | 12,379 | 75.29 | -2.83 |
| New Democratic | Jazminn Hintz | 2,817 | 17.13 | +4.24 |
| Wildrose Loyalty Coalition | Paul Hinman | 754 | 4.59 | – |
| Green | Joel Hunt | 239 | 1.45 | – |
| Alberta Independence | Frank Kast | 129 | 0.78 | – |
| Solidarity Movement | Brent Ginther | 124 | 0.75 | – |
| Total | | 16,442 | 99.52 | – |
| Rejected and declined | | 79 | 0.48 | |
| Turnout | | 16,521 | 56.30 | |
| Eligible voters | | 29,344 | | |
| United Conservative hold | | Swing | | -3.54 |
Source(s) Source: Elections Alberta

=== 2019 general election ===
2019 Alberta general election: Taber-Warner
| Party | Candidate | Votes | % | ±% |
|---|---|---|---|---|
| United Conservative | Grant R. Hunter | 14,321 | 78.12% | 1.22% |
| New Democratic | Laura Ross-Giroux | 2,363 | 12.89% | -6.41% |
| Alberta Party | Jason Beekman | 1,443 | 7.87% | – |
| Liberal | Amy Yates | 205 | 1.12% | – |
| Total | | 18,332 | – | – |
| Rejected, spoiled and declined | | 62 | 48 | 13 |
| Eligible electors / turnout | | 28,269 | 65.11% | – |
| United Conservative pickup new district. | | | | |
Source(s) Source: "85 - Taber-Warner, 2019 Alberta general election". officialresults.elections.ab.ca. Elections Alberta. Alberta. Chief Electoral Officer (2019). 2019 General Election. A Report of the Chief Electoral Officer. Volume II (PDF) (Report). Vol. 2. Edmonton, Alta.: Elections Alberta. pp. 413–419. ISBN 978-1-988620-12-1.

=== 2015 general election ===
2015 Alberta general election: Cardston-Taber-Warner
| Party | Candidate | Votes | % | ±% |
|---|---|---|---|---|
| Wildrose | Grant Hunter | 5,126 | 41.79% | -12.78% |
| Progressive Conservative | Brian Brewin | 4,356 | 35.51% | -2.58% |
| New Democratic | Aaron Haugen | 2,407 | 19.62% | 15.32% |
| Alberta Party | Delbert Bodnarek | 378 | 3.08% | – |
| Total | | 12,267 | – | – |
| Rejected, spoiled and declined | | 18 | – | – |
| Eligible electors / turnout | | 23,918 | 51.36% | 6.03% |
| Wildrose hold | | Swing | | -5.10% |
Source(s) Source: "53 - Cardston-Taber-Warner Official Results 2015 Alberta general election". officialresults.elections.ab.ca. Elections Alberta.

Alberta provincial government of Jason Kenney
Cabinet post (1)
| Predecessor | Office | Successor |
|---|---|---|
| Position Established | Associate Minister of Red Tape Reduction; April 30, 2019-July 07, 2021 | Tanya Fir |
