= Gary Bikman =

Canadian politician

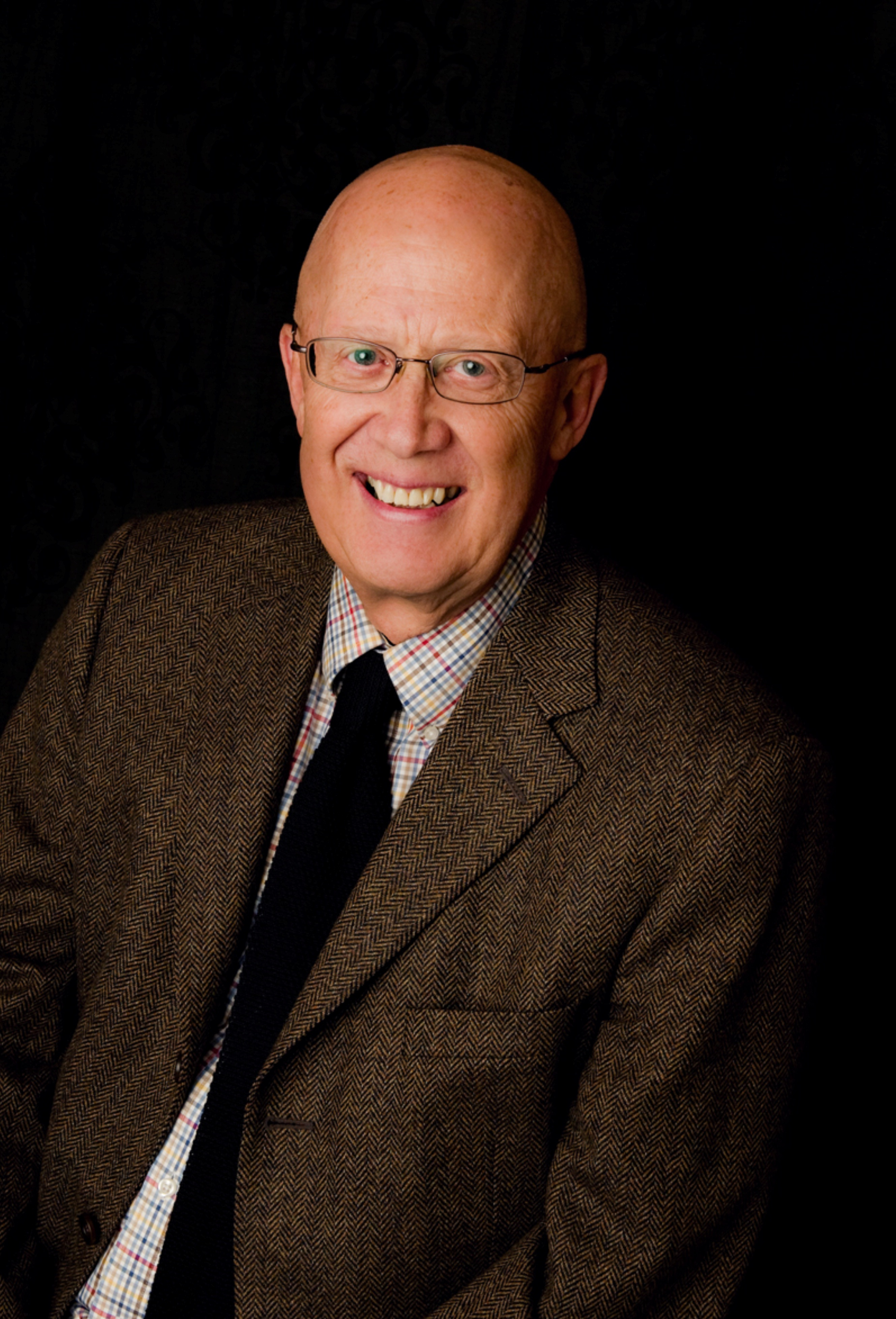

MLA for Cardston-Taber-Warner
- In office April 23, 2012 – May 5, 2015
- Preceded by: Broyce Jacobs
- Succeeded by: Grant Hunter

Personal details
- Born: November 13, 1943 (age 82) Lethbridge, Alberta
- Party: Wildrose Party (2012-2014); Alberta Progressive Conservative Party (2014-present)
- Education: Brigham Young University
- Website: bikman.ca

Gary W. Bikman (born November 13, 1943) is a Canadian politician who represented the electoral district of Cardston-Taber-Warner in the Legislative Assembly of Alberta from 2012 to 2015.

Prior to his election to the legislature, Bikman served on the town council of Stirling, including stints as mayor, deputy mayor and councillor since 1980.

Bikman was born and raised in southern Alberta. He holds a Bachelor of Science degree and a Master of Business Administration degree from Brigham Young University in Provo, Utah. Bikman has extensive business experience, having owned and managed an oilfield service company for 25 years. He co-founded and led ChopStix Restaurants from 2006 to 2010 and ChopStix International Franchising from 2010 to 2012. Bikman has been a sessional instructor at the University of Lethbridge's faculty of management and at Lethbridge College. He has also served intermittently as a member of the Chinook Arch Regional Library Board and as a scout leader in the village of Stirling.

Bikman was a critic of the Alberta government's decision to cut funding supports for persons with developmental disabilities in the 2013-2014 budget.

After the 2012 election, he faced some controversy when, in an interview with CTV News shortly after the election, he attributed his party's defeat to urban voters, who largely remained loyal to the governing Progressive Conservatives (PCs), possessing less "common sense" than the rural voters who turned to the Wildrose Party.

Bikman was first elected in the 2012 provincial election, as part of the Wildrose Party caucus. On December 17, 2014, he was one of nine Wildrose MLAs who crossed the floor to join the PC caucus. Bikman failed to earn the PC nomination as a candidate of his riding for the 2015 provincial election.

== Electoral history ==
2012 Alberta general election: Cardston-Taber-Warner
Party	Candidate	Votes	%	±%
Wildrose	Gary Bikman	6,116	54.57%	9.07%
Progressive Conservative	Patrick Shimbashi	4,269	38.09%	-7.93%
New Democratic	Aaron Haugen	482	4.30%	2.30%
Liberal	Helen McMenamin	341	3.04%	-1.54%
Total		11,208	–	–
Rejected, spoiled and declined		54	–	–
Eligible electors / turnout		24,845	45.33%	-2.49%
Wildrose gain from Progressive Conservative		Swing		7.98%
Source(s) Source: "53 - Cardston-Taber-Warner Official Results 2012 Alberta general election". officialresults.elections.ab.ca. Elections Alberta.
