= 2005 Alberta Alliance Party leadership election =

2005 Wildrose Party leadership election
- Date: Alberta Alliance Party; November 18–19, 2005
- Convention: Red Deer
- Resigning leader: Randy Thorsteinson
- Won by: Paul Hinman
- Ballots: 3
- Candidates: 4
- Entrance fee: $5,000
- Spending limit: N/A

The Alberta Alliance Party, a conservative political party in Alberta, Canada, held its second leadership election on November 18 and 19, 2005, in Red Deer, Alberta. The leadership position was vacated by Alberta Alliance Party founder and leader Randy Thorsteinson in March 2005.

Paul Hinman was elected leader on the third ballot, defeating the other candidates, Marilyn Burns, David Crutcher and Ed Klop. Hinman lead the party from this leadership election to the merge with the Wildrose Party of Alberta in 2008.

== Election results ==
The election was held using a preferential ballot. Members indicated their preferences in order on the ballot. After each round of voting, the candidate receiving the fewest votes was removed from the election, and his or her votes allocated to other candidates on the basis of the voters' indicated preferences.

All members who registered or renewed their memberships before October 6, 2005, were mailed a ballot. Members could mail in their ballots or take them to the leadership convention in Red Deer. Ballots had to be mailed in by November 18, 2005, to be eligible.

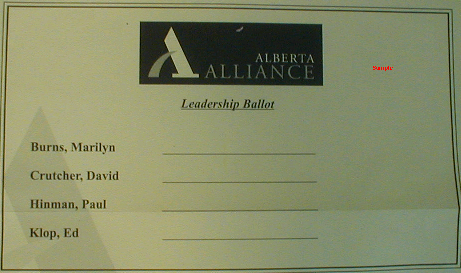
Sample Alberta Alliance leadership ballot

1st Ballot
Candidate	Votes	%
Paul Hinman	485	43.0%
Marilyn Burns	244	21.6%
David Crutcher	211	18.7%
Ed Klop	188	16.7%
Total	1,128	

2nd Ballot
Candidate	Votes	%
Paul Hinman	548	50.0%
Marilyn Burns	312	28.5%
David Crutcher	236	21.5%
Total	1,096	

3rd Ballot
Candidate	Votes	%
Paul Hinman	626	61.2%
Marilyn Burns	387	38.2%
Total	1,013	

== Candidates and platforms ==
Four candidates were officially nominated. Candidates needed 100 party member signatures and a $5,000 deposit to run for leader.

=== Marilyn Burns ===
Campaign slogan: "A Brighter Future, A Better Way" Marilyn Burns: Marilyn Burns is the Alberta Alliance justice critic and candidate for Stony Plain in the 2004 election. Marilyn was the first candidate to get her campaign off the ground. One of her main principles is defending Alberta's provincial rights, under a heavily expanded version of the Alberta Agenda. She is a lawyer, politician and mother of four from Edmonton Alberta. Informal polls have shown her to be fighting for the lead in the race with David Crutcher.

=== David Crutcher ===
Campaign slogan: "A new Alberta"

David Crutcher, a member of the Progressive Group for Independent business, backed by Craig Chandler, ran in Calgary-Egmont, and won the largerst percentage of the popular vote of any Alliance candidate in Calgary in the 2004 election.

- Supports an Alberta provincial tax on consumer goods
- Supports publicly funded alternative medicine in order to save money and resources
- Opposes same-sex marriage and abortion
- Supports Alberta's separation from Canada if the Conservative Party of Canada didn't win in the upcoming federal election.

=== Paul Hinman ===
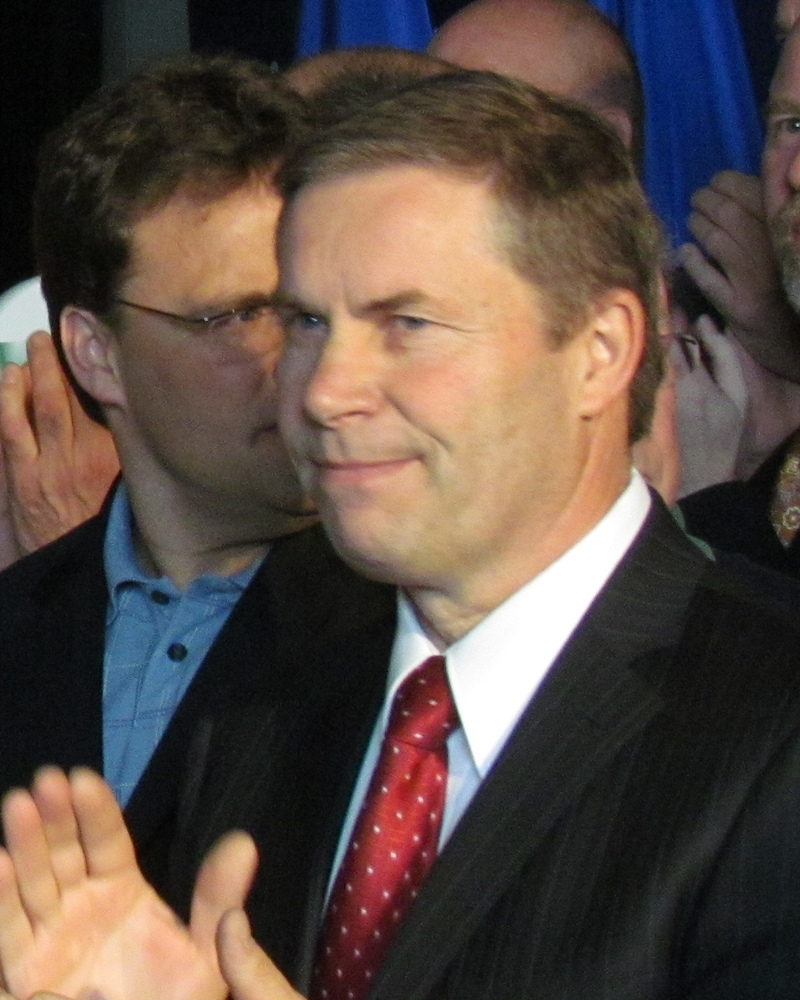

Campaign slogan: "Moving Forward"

Paul Hinman: deputy leader of the Alberta Alliance and the party's only current Member of the Legislative Assembly, representing Cardston-Taber-Warner. Believes that by having its leader in the legislature, the party will get more respect and attention in both the legislature and media. Has been endorsed by Lethbridge Conservative MP Rick Casson and former Little Bow Member of the Legislative Assembly Raymond Speaker.

=== Ed Klop ===
Campaign slogan: "Building Together" Ed Klop: Ed Klop is 38 years old from Red Deer; he ran for the Alberta Alliance in Lacombe-Ponoka. Ed achieved second place taking 18% of the vote.

Ed Klop has focused his platform around party building. His platform includes building constituency associations and the provincial council committees. Klop wants to increase communication through the various organizations in the party, as well as more communication with the membership at large.

Ed believes in building a solid base of conservative policies through regional policy development sessions all over the province, as well as working to increase fundraising and party membership.

== Candidates leadership debates ==
During the leadership election, two debates took place. The debate was hosted by the Freedom Radio Network, a radio show that was broadcast on AM 1140 in southern Alberta.

The entire audio of the debate was broken down into two parts to be rebroadcast later. The debate itself was taped before a live studio audience who purchased tickets beforehand.

Candidate Ed Klop joined the race after the debate and is not featured.

Debate part 1
Debate part 2

The second debate was held on October 18, 2005, in Edmonton. All four candidates participated. The second debate was held by the party and moderated by Eleanor Maroes.

== Campaign controversies ==
The election race's major developments in October 2005 centred on Craig Chandler and David Crutcher, whom many Alberta Alliance members began increasingly attacking for what they viewed as undesirable spin and campaign tactics. These tactics included attacking leadership candidates, former election, some party policies and the provincial council. The Crutcher team believes many on the council, including Eleanor Maroes, the interim leader, are actively campaigning for other candidates against party rules.

The first blow to the Craig Chandler campaign came on October 18, 2005, when Travis Chase, a former Alberta Alliance candidate in Calgary Fort issued a public statement removing himself from being associated with Craig Chandler and David Crutcher. He announced his support for Marilyn Burns. The result prompted the Craig Chandler campaign to threaten legal action against Travis Chase. On October 25, 2005, Travis responded by issuing a press release,

On October 25, 2005, former party leader Randy Thorsteinson broke his silence and endorsed Ed Klop, and attacking the Chandler campaign. The Crutcher camp responded with a deamon dialer phone message attempting to dismiss the statements as campaign propaganda. Craig Chandler responded with legal action against Randy Thorsteinson.

== Speculated candidates ==
The following people had been mentioned as possible choices to run for leader:

- Gary Horan: Senator-in-waiting candidate, had contemplated running, but backed Marilyn Burns.
- Preston Manning: the former Reform Party of Canada leader. Manning had been helping out Paul Hinman in the Legislative Assembly of Alberta. This caused the rumour mill to circulate his name as a possible leadership candidate.
- Deborah Grey: was also mentioned as a possible leadership candidate.
- Ted Morton: some Alberta Alliance members believed that Randy Thorsteinson should have waited until after the Progressive Conservative Party chooses a successor to Ralph Klein, so that Ted Morton could have run for leader of the Alliance if he did not win the leadership of the PC party. Randy Thorsteinson felt that the Alberta Alliance should never be a fall-back position for anyone. He has stated "The Alberta Alliance is the home of principled conservatives. Those that truly believe in reforming the Alberta Government realize that trying to change the Progressive Conservatives from within is a lost cause. It has never happened and never will. We must ensure that principled conservatives have a home led by people of character and integrity not opportunists. I chose to step down early to allow the new Leader as much time as possible to prepare for the next election and to make leadership aspirants choose between the Progressive Conservative or the Alberta Alliance leadership races. You will be able to determine their commitment to principle by the leadership race they choose to enter".

== Timeline of campaign developments ==
- April 15, 2005: Randy Thorsteinson steps down as leader of the Alberta Alliance
- May 27, 2005: Alberta Alliance convention held in Calgary, four candidates make their intentions known
- May 28, 2005: Day 2 of Alberta Alliance convention
- July 20, 2005: Marilyn Burns launches her campaign with backing of Gary Horan
- July 26, 2005: Marilyn Burns gains momentum after Paul Jackson publishes a column on her in the Calgary Sun
- August 1, 2005: Convention registration opened
- August 11, 2005: David Crutcher announces leadership bid.
- August 29, 2005: Paul Hinman announces leadership bid.
- September 12, 2005: Paul Hinman becomes the first candidate to officially be nominated.
- September 16, 2005: David Crutcher becomes the second candidate to officially be nominated.
- September 20, 2005: Marilyn Burns becomes the third candidate to officially be nominated.
- September 20, 2005: Nominations close
- September 22, 2005: Alberta Alliance leadership debate to be taped before a live audience
- September 24, 2005: Alberta Alliance leadership debate part 1 on AM 1140 at 6:30 p.m. MST
- September 28, 2005: Ed Klop officially announces leadership bid.
- October 1, 2005: Alberta Alliance leadership debate part 2 on AM 1140 at 6:30 p.m. MST
- October 6, 2005: Closing date for new members to vote for Leader.
- October 17, 2005: 2nd leadership debate, Old Timers' Cabin in Edmonton
- October 23, 2005: Randy Thorstienson endorses Ed Klop
- November 18, 2005: Day 1 of leadership convention
- November 19, 2005: Day 2 of leadership convention

== See also ==
- Alberta Alliance Party
- leadership convention
- 2006 Progressive Conservative Association of Alberta leadership election
