= Broyce Jacobs =

Canadian politician (1940–2025)

Broyce G. Jacobs

Member of the Legislative Assembly of Alberta
- In office March 12, 2001 – November 22, 2004
- Preceded by: Ron Hierath
- Succeeded by: Paul Hinman
- Constituency: Cardston-Taber-Warner
- In office March 3, 2008 – April 23, 2012
- Preceded by: Paul Hinman
- Succeeded by: Gary Bikman

Personal details
- Born: July 29, 1940 Cardston, Alberta, Canada
- Died: March 14, 2025 (aged 84)
- Party: Progressive Conservative
- Spouse: Linda
- Children: 8
- Education: Brigham Young University
- Occupation: Rancher, politician

Broyce G. Jacobs (July 29, 1940 – March 14, 2025) was a Canadian politician who was a member of the Legislative Assembly of Alberta representing the constituency of Cardston-Taber-Warner as a Progressive Conservative.

== Early life ==
Jacobs was born in Cardston, Alberta in 1940. He graduated with a degree in business management from Brigham Young University in 1967, focusing on banking and financing with minors in economics and accounting.

== Political career ==
Jacobs first ran for a seat to the Legislative Assembly of Alberta in the 1979 Alberta general election as a candidate for Social Credit. He ran in the electoral district of Cardston, mounting a strong challenge to incumbent John Thompson but was unable to defeat him.

Jacobs ran for the Progressive Conservative nomination in a convention held on February 12, 1986, in the town of Magrath. He was defeated by Jack Ady who would go on to win the district.

In the 2008 Alberta general election, Jacobs was elected to his second term, representing Cardston-Taber-Warner. He sat on the Private Bills Committee, the Public Accounts Committee and the Standing Committee on Public Safety and Services. On September 16, 2009, Jacobs was named Parliamentary Assistant for Agriculture and Rural Development.

Jacobs first entered provincial politics in 2001 Alberta general election, during that term he chaired the Health Information Act Review Committee and sat on several other committees.

In the 2004 Alberta general election, Jacobs lost by a 129-vote margin to Paul Hinman, a then- Alberta Alliance party member. He regained his seat in the Legislature in 2008, with a 38-vote margin over Hinman, leader of the Wildrose Alliance Party, shutting the party out of the Legislature in an election where the Progressive Conservatives took 72 of the 83 seats provincewide.

Before entering provincial politics, Jacobs served as a councillor for 18 years in the Municipal District of Cardston. He was a reeve for 17 of those years. As a municipal politician, Jacobs sat on numerous committees and task forces. He was a director of the Alberta Association of Municipal Districts and Counties for four years and president of the Foothills-Little Bow association, which represents the 11 municipal districts and counties in southern Alberta.

== Personal life and death ==
Jacobs lived with his wife Linda in Mountain View, Alberta, where they operated a cattle ranch with their son Troy. The couple had eight adult children. Jacobs had coached basketball and baseball and served on the local recreation board. He died on March 14, 2025, at the age of 84.

== Election results ==
2001 Alberta general election: Cardston-Taber-Warner
| Party | Candidate | Votes | % | ±% |
|---|---|---|---|---|
| Progressive Conservative | Broyce Jacobs | 5,256 | 53.63% | −5.55% |
| Alberta First | John Reil | 2,557 | 26.09% | – |
| Liberal | Ron Hancock | 1,747 | 17.83% | 0.95% |
| New Democratic | Suzanne Sirias | 240 | 2.45% | −3.50% |
| Total | | 9,800 | – | – |
| Rejected, spoiled and declined | | 21 | – | – |
| Eligible electors / turnout | | 18,470 | 53.17% | – |
| Progressive Conservative hold | | Swing | | −15.82% |
Source(s) Source: "Cardston-Taber-Warner Official Results 2001 Alberta general election" (PDF). Elections Alberta.

2004 Alberta general election: Cardston-Taber-Warner
| Party | Candidate | Votes | % | ±% |
|---|---|---|---|---|
| Alberta Alliance | Paul Hinman | 3,885 | 43.98% | – |
| Progressive Conservative | Broyce Jacobs | 3,756 | 42.52% | -11.12% |
| Liberal | Paula Shimp | 783 | 8.86% | -8.96% |
| Greens | Lindsay Ferguson | 225 | 2.55% | – |
| New Democratic | Luann Bannister | 185 | 2.09% | -0.35% |
| Total | | 8,834 | – | – |
| Rejected, spoiled and declined | | 47 | – | – |
| Eligible electors / turnout | | 19,030 | 46.67% | -6.44% |
| Alberta Alliance gain from Progressive Conservative | | Swing | | -13.04% |
Source(s) Source: "Cardston-Taber-Warner Statement of Official Results 2004 Alberta general election" (PDF). Elections Alberta.

2008 Alberta general election: Cardston-Taber-Warner
| Party | Candidate | Votes | % | ±% |
|---|---|---|---|---|
| Progressive Conservative | Broyce Jacobs | 4,374 | 46.02% | 3.50% |
| Wildrose Alliance | Paul Hinman | 4,325 | 45.50% | 2.98% |
| Liberal | Ron Hancock | 436 | 4.59% | -4.28% |
| New Democratic | Suzanne Sirias | 190 | 2.00% | -0.10% |
| Green | William Turner | 180 | 1.89% | -0.66% |
| Total | | 9,505 | – | – |
| Rejected, spoiled and declined | | 14 | – | – |
| Eligible electors / turnout | | 19,905 | 47.82% | 1.15% |
| Progressive Conservative gain from Alberta Alliance | | Swing | | -0.47% |
Source(s) Source: The Report on the March 3, 2008 Provincial General Election of the Twenty-seventh Legislative Assembly (PDF). Elections Alberta. July 28, 2008. pp. 386–391.
