= Marilyn Burns (politician) =

Canadian lawyer and politician

Leader of the Alberta Advantage Party
- Incumbent
- Assumed office November 15, 2021
- Preceded by: Lenard Biscope (interim)
- In office February 24, 2018 – September 29, 2020
- Preceded by: Gil Poitras (interim)
- Succeeded by: Lenard Biscope (interim)

Personal details
- Party: Alberta Advantage Party
- Children: Four
- Profession: Lawyer

Marilyn Burns (born 1956 or 1957) is a Canadian lawyer and politician who currently serves as the leader of the Alberta Advantage Party. She was previously active in the Alberta Alliance Party and the Wildrose Party.

Born in Edmonton, Alberta, she was educated at a Christian college in Moose Jaw, at Athabasca University, and then at the University of Calgary Faculty of Law, from which she earned a Bachelor of Laws. She articled with Ogilvie and Company, and since 2001 has been practicing has a personal injury lawyer with McCourt Law Offices in Edmonton. Prior to practicing law, she worked jobs that included farm worker, waitress, piano instructor, deli clerk, school secretary, nurse's aide, and summer camp instructor. She is a single mother of four children.

Burns ran in the 2004 Alberta general election in Stony Plain for the Alberta Alliance Party, and placed third of five candidates. When party founder Randy Thorsteinson stepped down as leader in 2005, she ran in the ensuing leadership contest to replace him. She finished second of four candidates, losing on the third and final ballot to Paul Hinman. She was involved with the founding of the Wildrose Party of Alberta and, when that party joined with the Alberta Alliance to form the Wildrose Party in 2008, she joined the new party and served as president of its Edmonton-South West constituency association. She opposed Wildrose's 2017 merger with the Progressive Conservatives (PCs) to form the United Conservative Party (UCP) on the grounds that she saw it as a takeover of Wildrose by the PCs, and was one of a group of about fifty disaffected Wildrose members who, rather than joining the UCP, founded the Alberta Advantage Party. She was acclaimed as leader of that party at its inaugural convention in February 2018. In the 2019 Alberta general election, she stood for election as the Alberta Advantage candidate in Edmonton-South West, where she finished in fourth place, with 0.9% of the vote.

She left the leadership of the party in 2020, but returned in 2021.

== Electoral record ==
=== 2023 Alberta general election ===
2023 Alberta general election: Lac Ste. Anne-Parkland
Party	Candidate	Votes	%	±%
United Conservative	Shane Getson	14,923	68.96	+3.22
New Democratic	Oneil Carlier	5,868	27.12	+3.71
Alberta Party	Janet Jabush	463	2.14	-5.61
Green	Vanessa Diehl	205	0.95	–
Advantage Party	Marilyn Burns	182	0.84	-0.56
Total		21,641	99.61	–
Rejected and declined		85	0.39	
Turnout		21,726	61.27	
Eligible voters		35,460		
United Conservative hold		Swing		-0.25
Source(s) Source: Elections Alberta

=== 2022 by-election ===
Alberta provincial by-election, 15 March 2022: Fort McMurray-Lac La Biche
Party	Candidate	Votes	%	±%
United Conservative	Brian Jean	3,717	63.6%	-2.73
New Democratic	Ariana Mancini	1,081	18.5%	-6.01
Wildrose Independence	Paul Hinman	628	10.8%	–
Liberal	Abdulhakim Hussein	211	3.6%	–
Alberta Party	Michelle Landsiedel	98	1.7%	-4.08
Independent	Brian Deheer	57	1.0%	–
Alberta Advantage Party	Marilyn Burns	25	0.4%	–
Alberta Independence	Steven Mellott	24	0.4%	-1.43
Total valid votes		5,837		
Total rejected ballots		0		
Turnout		24.27%		
Eligible voters		24,048		

=== 2019 Alberta general election ===
2019 Alberta general election: Edmonton-South West
Party	Candidate	Votes	%	±%
United Conservative	Kaycee Madu	10,254	44.99	+5.96
New Democratic	John Archer	9,539	41.85	-11.97
Alberta Party	Mo Elsalhy	2,668	11.70	+9.04
Alberta Advantage	Marilyn Burns	208	0.91	–
Green	Rigel Vincent	125	0.55	–
Total		22,794	99.29	–
Rejected, spoiled and declined		162	0.71	
Turnout		22,956	70.15	
Eligible voters		32,726		
United Conservative notional gain from New Democratic		Swing		+8.97
Source(s) Source: "43 - Edmonton-South West, 2019 Alberta general election". officialresults.elections.ab.ca. Elections Alberta. Alberta. Chief Electoral Officer (2019). 2019 General Election. A Report of the Chief Electoral Officer. Volume II (PDF) (Report). Vol. 2. Edmonton, Alta.: Elections Alberta. pp. 168–170. ISBN 978-1-988620-12-1.

=== 2005 Alberta Alliance leadership election ===
1st Ballot
Candidate	Votes	%
Paul Hinman	485	43.0%
Marilyn Burns	244	21.6%
David Crutcher	211	18.7%
Ed Klop	188	16.7%
Total	1,128	

2nd Ballot
Candidate	Votes	%
Paul Hinman	548	50.0%
Marilyn Burns	312	28.5%
David Crutcher	236	21.5%
Total	1,096	

3rd Ballot
Candidate	Votes	%
Paul Hinman	626	61.2%
Marilyn Burns	387	38.2%
Total	1,013	

=== 2004 Alberta general election ===
2004 Alberta general election: Stony Plain
Party	Candidate	Votes	%	±%
Progressive Conservative	Fred Lindsay	5,581	44.51%	-22.69%
Liberal	Bill Fraser	3,381	26.97%	3.38%
Alberta Alliance	Marilyn Burns	1,904	15.19%	–
New Democratic	Ruth Yanor	1,362	10.86%	1.65%
Social Credit	Henry Neumann	310	2.47%	–
Total		12,538	–	–
Rejected, spoiled and declined		44	–	–
Eligible electors / turnout		26,086	48.23%	-9.71%
Progressive Conservative hold		Swing		-13.03%
Source(s) Source: "Stony Plain Official Results 2004 Alberta general election". Alberta Heritage Community Foundation.
