= Eleanor Maroes =

Canadian politician (1943–2017)

interim Leader of the Alberta Alliance Party
- In office 2005–2005
- Preceded by: Randy Thorsteinson
- Succeeded by: Paul Hinman

Personal details
- Born: July 20, 1943
- Died: January 13, 2017 (aged 73)
- Party: Alberta Alliance Party
- Other political affiliations: Reform Party of Canada

Eleanor Maroes (July 20, 1943 – January 13, 2017) was a former politician and life insurance agent from Alberta, Canada. She served as interim leader of the Alberta Alliance Party in 2005.

== Political activities ==
Maroes ran for a seat in the House of Commons of Canada in the 1997 Canadian federal election as a Reform candidate in the riding of Edmonton Southeast. She was defeated by incumbent David Kilgour, finishing a close second out of the field of five candidates.

Maroes would become involved in provincial politics with the Alberta Alliance Party when it was formed in 2002. She held a number of executive positions in the party and contested as a candidate in the 2004 Alberta general election as a candidate in the provincial electoral district of Edmonton-Ellerslie. She was defeated finishing fourth out of fifth in the open race losing to Liberal candidate Bharat Agnihotri.

After the election, Randy Thorsteinson resigned as leader and Maroes who was serving on the executive was appointed to manage the party until a leadership convention was held. She led the party under a very fractious leadership race until Paul Hinman was chosen as leader on November 19, 2005.
