= Alberta Liberal Party candidates in the 2008 Alberta provincial election =

The Alberta Liberal Party fielded 82 candidates in the 2008 provincial election.

== Candidates elected ==
- Calgary-Buffalo: Kent Hehr
- Calgary-Currie: Dave Taylor
- Calgary-McCall: Darshan Kang
- Calgary-Mountain View: David Swann
- Calgary-Varsity: Harry B. Chase
- Edmonton-Centre: Laurie Blakeman
- Edmonton-Gold Bar: Hugh MacDonald
- Edmonton-Riverview: Kevin Taft
- Lethbridge-East: Bridget Pastoor

== Incumbents defeated ==
- Calgary-Elbow: Craig Cheffins
- Edmonton-Decore: Bill Bonko
- Edmonton-Ellerslie: Bharat Agnihotri
- Edmonton-Glenora: Bruce Miller
- Edmonton-McClung: Mo Elsalhy
- Edmonton-Mill Woods: Weslyn Mather
- Edmonton-Rutherford: Rick Miller
- St. Albert: Jack Flaherty

== Other candidates ==
- Calgary-Lougheed: Lori Czerwinski
- Calgary-North West: Dale Martin D'Silva
- Calgary-Hays: Bill Kurtze
- Cypress-Medicine Hat: Dick Mastel
- Calgary-Mackay: Tianna Melnyk
- Banff-Cochrane: Patricia Robertson
- Calgary-Foothills: Mike Robinson
- Calgary-Shaw: John Roggeveen
- Calgary-Bow: Greg Flanagan
