= Alberta Alliance Party =

- Former provincial party
- Leader: Paul Hinman (2005–2008)
- President: Randy Thorsteinson (2007–2008)
- Founded: October 25, 2002
- Dissolved: January 31, 2008
- Merged into: Wildrose Alliance
- Headquarters: #3, 1303 44 Ave NE; Calgary, Alberta, Canada
- Ideology: Conservatism; Economic liberalism
- Colours: Blue & Green

The Alberta Alliance was a right-wing provincial political party in Alberta, Canada. Many of its members were supporters of the defunct Canadian Alliance federal political party and its predecessor, the Reform Party of Canada. Members also joined from similar provincial fringe parties like the Alberta First Party, the Alberta Party and Social Credit. Alliance supporters tended to view themselves as "true conservatives," and believed the Progressive Conservative governments of Premiers Ralph Klein and Ed Stelmach were out of touch with the needs of Albertans.

Paul Hinman was elected the party's leader at a leadership convention held on November 19, 2005.

On January 19, 2008, the party voted to change its name to the Wildrose Alliance Party when it absorbed the unregistered Wildrose Party of Alberta.

== Early history ==
The party was registered on October 25, 2002 and its founding convention was held for two days beginning on February 14, 2003, in Red Deer, Alberta.

Former Social Credit Party leader Randy Thorsteinson, was selected as the first leader of the party on the second day of the founding convention on February 15, 2003. Thorsteinson had experience in Alberta politics as he was leader of Social Credit from 1992 to 1999. He left the party in April 1999, in protest of an internal party proposal to limit the involvement of Mormons within the Party.

The old logo 2002 to 2006

The Canadian Alliance (CA) never formed provincial wings or forged formal links with existing provincial parties. In the case of the CA's predecessor, the Reform Party of Canada, an inactive Reform Party of Alberta had been formed by members of the federal party to keep the Reform name out of provincial politics. Unlike the Reform Party, the founders of the Alberta Alliance intended to form a very active party, and many members of the Alberta Alliance hoped the new party would be seen as the unofficial provincial wing of the CA.

The new party never sought a formal link with the CA, and had it done so, the overture would likely have been rebuffed, since many Albertan CA members continued to support the Progressive Conservatives. However, the Alberta Alliance used the same blue-and-green colours used by the CA, and its logo bears a striking resemblance to that of the federal party. The Alberta Alliance continued to grow following the Canadian Alliance's merger with the Progressive Conservative Party of Canada to form the new Conservative Party of Canada.

The Alliance gained its first Member of the Legislative Assembly of Alberta (MLA) on June 29, 2004, when Gary Masyk crossed the floor, quitting the Progressive Conservative Party to protest Ralph Klein's handling of health care issues during the 2004 federal election. Masyk had represented the electoral district of Edmonton-Norwood since 2001.

== 2004 election campaign ==
The Alliance nominated candidates in all 83 electoral divisions and three candidates for the senator-in-waiting, for the 2004 Alberta election, which was held on November 22, 2004. The party was excluded from Global Television Network's leaders' debate because it had not elected any members in the 2001 election, which was held before the party was founded. Some Alliance members noted that in the 1997 election, the Alberta New Democratic Party leader was allowed in the debate (as was then Social Credit leader Thorsteinson), even though the NDP had no MLAs at the time. They also noted that the NDP did not even have a full slate of candidates in the 1997 election.

The Alliance hired an American firm, Campaign Secrets, to help run its campaign. Campaign Secrets, which has extensive experience working on Republican campaigns, produced advertisements that were criticized by some Albertans for employing "U.S.-style" negative campaign tactics. The Alliance leadership defended its use of American strategists, claiming that most right-leaning Albertan consultants were already hired by the well-heeled Tories.

=== "I Blame Ralph" ===
The Alberta Alliance Party devised a campaign strategy in September 2004 prior to election called "I Blame Ralph", the purpose of which was to court voters who were uncomfortable with Ralph Klein's behaviour, and highlight his tight controls over the government's decision making.

The party kicked off the "I Blame Ralph" tour holding pre-election campaign events in numerous cities including opening its Campaign Headquarters in Red Deer. Part of the promotional package used by the party was bumper stickers a variety of fliers for different problems and a television ad, as well as T-shirts and a website. "I Blame Ralph" received significant attention, but did not include any of the standard Alberta Alliance logos or colours, instead using red and white leading many to believe the Liberals were responsible.

=== Senate campaign ===
The Alberta Alliance party ran three senator-in-waiting candidates in the 2004 Alberta Senate nominee election. The Alberta Alliance was the only party besides the Progressive Conservatives to successfully nominate candidates. The Social Credit Party had intended to run a candidate but failed to get the signatures required to field a candidate.

The candidates finished 7th, 8th, and 10th out of the field of 10 candidates in the block vote.

Candidate	Votes #	Votes %	Ballots %	Place
Michael Roth	176, 339	8.1%	24.7%	7th
Vance Gough	167, 770	7.7%	23.5%	8th
Gary Horan	156, 175	7.2%	21.9%	10th

=== Legislature results ===
On election day, results for the party could be described as mixed. Most analysts did not expect the two-year-old party to seriously challenge the Progressive Conservative government. The party made a few in roads finishing second in a number of rural districts and a few respectable third place showing in Calgary.

The party's lone incumbent MLA, Gary Masyk, was defeated running for re-election in the new electoral district of Edmonton Decore, placing a distant fourth. Masyk's old electoral district Edmonton-Norwood had been merged in Edmonton Highlands, the district represented by popular New Democrat leader Brian Mason.

The party on the whole did very poorly in the urban ridings of Edmonton and Calgary. The Alliance appears to have played spoiler in some urban seats, siphoning off enough votes from the Tories that Liberals or New Democrats were elected.

The Alberta Alliance had its best results in rural seats. The party won a narrow victory in the Progressive Conservative stronghold of Cardston-Taber-Warner, where Paul Hinman became the first MLA elected under the Alliance banner, defeating incumbent Broyce Jacobs. In several others it managed to finish second. Party Leader Randy Thorsteinson placed second running in Innisfail-Sylvan Lake. The rural results were mixed, though -- it was badly defeated in other districts.

Candidates	Seats	Votes	%	Place
83	1	77, 506	8.7%	4th

=== Aftermath of the 2004 election ===
On March 7, 2005, Thorsteinson announced his resignation as leader of the Alberta Alliance, citing that he would not be able to devote the time and energy into the party. He stepped down on April 15, 2005. A leadership convention was called for November 19, 2005. Eleanor Maroes was appointed leader by the Provincial Council to serve in the interim until the new leader was chosen.

== 2005 leadership election ==
The party replaced former leader Randy Thorsteinson in a two-day leadership convention held on November 18, and November 19, 2005 in Red Deer.

The nominations closed on September 20, 2005. Candidates were eligible if had been a party member for at least 90 days prior to the convention, obtain 100 signatures from party members in good standing, and provide a $5,000 deposit.

The Alberta Alliance had four candidates were nominated:

- Paul Hinman
- Marilyn Burns
- David Crutcher
- Ed Klop

Paul Hinman was elected as the party's new leader on November 19, 2005, after a bitter leadership campaign. He was elected on the third ballot defeating Marilyn Burns.

== Merger talks ==
Following the leadership convention, the party entered discussion about merging with the Social Credit Party of Alberta and re-entered merger talks with the Alberta Party in order to unite the political right in Alberta.

Merger talks with the Social Credit collapsed after a motion was put forward at the 2006 Social Credit policy convention to break off merger talks and focus on electing members in the next provincial election.

The Alberta Alliance Party and Alberta Party held their Annual General Meetings on March 23, 2007 and March 24, 2007, in Edmonton and Red Deer, respectively, to vote on a new party constitution that would have merged the parties. The new party would have kept the Alberta Alliance Party name and Paul Hinman as leader. Talks between the two parties had been on-going prior to the election in 2004. The Alberta Alliance party membership voted to withhold a potential merger until after the Alberta Party had resolved its legal troubles.

== 2006 Progressive Conservative leadership election ==
In an unorthodox political move, on October 11, 2006, Alliance leader Paul Hinman encouraged his party members to buy memberships in the rival Progressive Conservative Party and vote for candidate Ted Morton in the PC Party's upcoming leadership race, as Morton is considered the candidate that is ideologically most in sync with Alliance philosophies.

The idea wasn't well received by the provincial council and voted down.

It has been argued by some that parties such as Social Credit and Alberta Alliance could, with sufficient support, possibly threaten the now-traditional Progressive Conservative dominance in the province despite the much greater levels of support currently attained by parties such as the Liberal and New Democratic parties. The basis for such an argument is that both Social Credit and Alberta Alliance would most likely to compete for the "rural vote"- traditionally PC heartland. However, this has so far failed to materialize despite the promising showings by both parties in a number of ridings in recent elections.

== 2007 by-elections ==
The Alberta Alliance began its campaign for the Calgary Elbow and Drumheller-Stettler by-elections at the Annual General Meeting held on March 24, 2007. At that meeting, former party leader Randy Thorsteinson returned to the executive as the president of the party.

The Alberta Alliance party pinned its best hopes in picking up Drumheller-Stettler, a rural riding in central Alberta. The Alliance nominated Dave France, who had finished third as the candidate in the previous general election. In Calgary Elbow the party nominated its chief financial officer Jane Greydanus to stand as the candidate.

When the returns came back on June 12, 2007, Dave France finished a distant fifth place and there was a significant re-alignment of votes among the opposition parties. The Drumheller-Stettler seat was retained by the Progressive Conservatives. In Calgary Elbow the party managed a slight increase in its popular vote percent but failed to make a breakthrough. The party retained its previous fourth-place standing in the riding.

== Oil royalties ==
After the release of the Oil Royalty Review Panel Final Report, the Alberta Alliance came out strongly in favour of petroleum producers. The party released a new website called Protect Our Prosperity, which sought to inform Albertans about the possible consequences for oil royalty increases.

== Merger with the Wildrose Party ==
The Alberta Alliance membership voted on January 19, 2008 to merge with the upstart Wildrose Party to create the "Wildrose Alliance". To effect the merger, the Alberta Alliance Party changed its name to the Wildrose Alliance Party of Alberta and allowed all members of the Wildrose Party of Alberta to exchange their membership in the Wildrose Party for a membership in the Wildrose Alliance for the unexpired term. The new party adopted bylaws substantially the same as those of the Wildrose Party of Alberta, and immediately conducted an election of officers. The Wildrose Alliance accepted all the assets and liabilities of the Wildrose Party of Alberta.
