= Advantage Party of Alberta =

Provincial political party in Canada

- Active provincial party
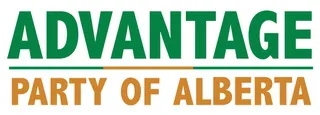
- Leader: Marilyn Burns
- President: Carol Nordlund-Kinsey
- Founded: July 29, 2017
- Registered: November 9, 2018
- Preceded by: Alberta Advantage Party
- Headquarters: Box 82 Winfield, AB T0C 2X0
- Ideology: Conservatism; Social conservatism
- Political position: Right-wing
- Colours: Green Gold
- Seats in Legislature: 0 / 87

Website
- AlbertaAdvantageParty.ca

The Advantage Party of Alberta is a registered political party in Alberta, Canada. The party was founded on July 29, 2017 and registered with Elections Alberta on November 9, 2018. Its leader is Marilyn Burns, and the party's philosophy is situated on the right side of the political spectrum. Its platform includes "membership driven policy, protection of individual rights and freedoms and politician accountability".

The Advantage Party of Alberta ran 28 candidates in the 2019 Alberta general election, none of whom placed higher than fourth. Province-wide, the party took 0.3% of the vote; its most successful candidate by vote share was Terry Blaquier in Cypress-Medicine Hat, who took 1.43% of the vote en route to a fourth-place finish in a five-candidate field. Other top candidate placings were Gil Poitras in Leduc-Beaumont, Ron Malowany in Fort Saskatchewan-Vegreville and Kelly Zeleny in Vermilion-Lloydminster-Wainwright.

On February 5, 2022, the Alberta Advantage Party changed its official name to the Advantage Party of Alberta as voted on at the Annual General Meeting. The change was accepted by Elections Alberta on February 9, 2022. On January 1, 2023, the official logo was changed after a decision by membership.

== Leaders ==
| Leader | Term in office | | Notes |
|---|---|---|---|
| Gil Poitras | 2017 | February 24, 2018 | Interim |
| Marilyn Burns | February 24, 2018 | September 29, 2020 | |
| Lenard Biscope | September 29, 2020 | November 15, 2021 | Interim |
| Marilyn Burns | November 15, 2021 | present | |
