= Wildrose Party of Alberta =

Political organization in Alberta, Canada

Logo

The Wildrose Party of Alberta was a centre-right political organization founded in Alberta, Canada in 2007. The organization took its name from Alberta's provincial flower.

On January 19, 2008, the members merged with the Alberta Alliance Party to form the Wildrose Alliance Party.

== Objectives and philosophy ==
According to a media advisory issued by the party on June 26, 2007, its main emphasis was to be:

- "Reducing by constitutional means the enormous net outflow of wealth from Albertans to the federal government"
- "Ensuring that provincial decisions better reflect the mainstream values and priorities of most Albertans"
- "Ensuring that the party's Leader and MLAs honour their election promises and commitments"

According to Don Weisbeck, Mayor of Brooks and Vice President (Communications) for the party, "the provincial government has swayed from its conservative roots. They've become one of the fastest spending and highest taxing jurisdictions in the country compared to their original roots where they tried to minimize taxes and government involvement in people's lives".

The party constitution emphasized control by the grass-roots.

== History ==
The party was launched on June 23, 2007 at a meeting in Red Deer. with members citing disagreement with other parties available to push back against federal actions or implement provincial expenditure control. The initiative was bolstered by two recent by-elections in which support for conservative parties plunged overall, while liberal support did not increase." The poor performance of the Alberta Alliance in the June by-elections reinforced the view that the Alberta Alliance would not be able to effectively challenge the government of Premier Ed Stelmach. Prominent former Alberta Alliance members who have joined the Wildrose Party include Eleanor Maroes.

The organization applied to Elections Alberta in June 2007, to become a registered political party; however, they were never registered.

== Interim Executive Committee ==
- Rob James, President (Calgary, former southern Alberta campaign chair for the Progressive Conservative party)
- Daniel Johnson, Vice-President Membership (Edmonton)
- Gordon Lang, Vice-President Fundraising (Calgary)
- John Hilton-O'Brien, Vice-President Policy (Calgary)
- Link Byfield, Vice-President Communications (Riviere Qui Barre)
- Eleanor Maroes, Treasurer (Edmonton)
- Rosemary Craig, Secretary (Calgary)

Southern Directors:

- Ryan Wall, Calgary Zone (Calgary)
- Shyla Patten, Southwest Zone (Didsbury)
- Don Ebenal, Southeast Zone (Red Deer)

Northern Directors:

- Phil Gamache, Edmonton Zone (Edmonton)
- Dean Schmale, Northeast Zone (Winfield)
- Todd Brown, Northwest Zone (Thorsby)

== See also ==
- Politics of Alberta
- Registered Alberta political parties
- Wildrose Party
- Wildrose Independence Party of Alberta
