= Larry Shaben =

Canadian politician (1935–2008)

Member of the Legislative Assembly of Alberta
- In office 1975–1989
- Preceded by: Dennis Barton
- Succeeded by: Pearl Calahasen
- Constituency: Lesser Slave Lake

Minister of Utilities and Telephones
- In office March 1979 – November 1982
- Preceded by: Allan Warrack
- Succeeded by: Robert Bogle

Minister of Housing
- In office November 1982 – May 1986
- Preceded by: Tom Chambers
- Succeeded by: Ray Danyluk

Minister of Economic Development and Trade
- In office May 1986 – March 1989
- Preceded by: Hugh Planche
- Succeeded by: Peter Elzinga

Personal details
- Born: March 20, 1935 Hanna, Alberta, Canada
- Died: September 6, 2008 (aged 73) Edmonton, Alberta, Canada
- Party: Progressive Conservative
- Spouse: Alma Shaben
- Education: University of Alberta

Lawrence "Larry" Ralph Shaben (March 20, 1935 – September 6, 2008) was a Canadian politician of Lebanese descent and the first Muslim Cabinet Minister in Canada. He was also one of the first Muslims to be elected to higher office in North America. He held a seat in the Legislative Assembly of Alberta from 1975 to 1989 sitting with the governing Progressive Conservative Caucus. During his time in office he served as a cabinet minister in the governments of Premier Peter Lougheed and Don Getty occupying various portfolios from 1979 to 1989.

== Early life ==
Lawrence Ralph Shaben was born on March 20, 1935, in Hanna, Alberta The family moved to Edmonton in the mid-1940s after North America's first mosque was opened there.

Shaben went to Eastwood High School before going on to the University of Alberta. He left university early to join the workforce, although his daughter admitted in a book that he goofed off so much in college that he flunked out. Shaben married Alma Saddy in 1960 and they had five children by 1966. He moved his family to High Prairie and bought a general store.

== Political career ==
Shaben got his first start in politics by serving on the municipal council for the town of High Prairie. He moved his career to the provincial level when he ran for a seat in the Alberta Legislature in the 1975 Alberta general election. He ran in the electoral district of Lesser Slave Lake as a candidate for the Progressive Conservative party. He won the electoral district defeating incumbent Dennis Barton and a third candidate by a wide margin to pick up the seat for his party. With his win Shaben was the first Arab elected in Alberta and among the first Muslims elected to higher political office in North America.

Shaben ran for a second term in office in the 1979 Alberta general election. He faced a tougher race, losing a little bit of his popular vote from the previous election against three other candidates including future MLA Dan Backs. Shaben held his district and was returned to the Legislature.

After the election Premier Peter Lougheed appointed Shaben to the Executive Council of Alberta. He became Minister of Utilities and Telephones. His appointment would make him the first Muslim cabinet minister in Canada. He would run for a third term in office in the 1982 general election with ministerial advantage. Shaben would easily hold his district defeating the four other candidates with a much larger popular vote and margin of victory.

Lougheed shuffled his cabinet after the election. Shaben became the Minister of Housing. In 1984, Shaben survived a plane crash near High Prairie, Alberta that killed fellow MLA and Alberta NDP leader Grant Notley and five other passengers.

He held that portfolio after Don Getty became Premier in 1985. Shaben would run a fourth term in office in the 1986 general election. He would face a hotly contested fight against New Democrat candidate Bert Dube. Despite his popular vote dropping Shaben was able to hang onto his seat.

Getty made his first cabinet shuffle after the election and appointed Shaben to his final portfolio as Minister of Economic Development and Trade. He held that portfolio until he retired at dissolution of the Assembly in 1989.

== Late life ==
Shaben was severely beaten by a hitchhiker and wound up hospitalized in 1986. Following 9/11, Shaben became active in promoting greater tolerance and understanding of Muslims in Canada. He was later instrumental in establishing the Edmonton Islamic Academy and a Chair In Islamic Studies at the University of Alberta.

In 2005 he was appointed a federal citizenship judge.

Shaben died on September 6, 2008, following a long bout with cancer. His funeral was attended by more than 1,000 people and numerous politicians including three provincial Premiers.

== See also ==
- Into the Abyss (book)
