= Scott Sinclair (politician) =

Canadian politician

Scott Sinclair MLA
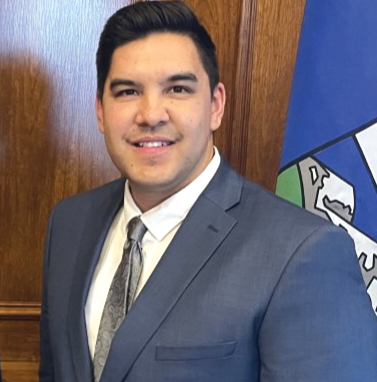

Member of the Legislative Assembly of Alberta for Lesser Slave Lake
- Incumbent
- Assumed office May 29, 2023
- Preceded by: Pat Rehn

Personal details
- Born: September 12, 1984 (age 42) Slave Lake, Alberta, Canada
- Party: United Conservative (until March 2025, since May 2026)
- Other political affiliations: Independent (from March 2025 to May 2026); Alberta Party (2025)

Scott Sinclair (born September 12, 1984) is a Canadian politician and former hockey player who has served as a member of the Legislative Assembly of Alberta (MLA) for the riding of Lesser Slave Lake since 2023. He is a member of the United Conservative Party (UCP).

== Life and career ==
Sinclair is the son of Gordon and Val Sinclair. He played junior hockey in the Saskatchewan Junior Hockey League (SJHL) and Alberta Junior Hockey League (AJHL) with the Estevan Bruins, Lloydminster Blazers and Yorkton Terriers, winning a league championship in the 2004–05 season with Yorkton. He works in the auto glass business.

He is Non-status First Nations, and one of three Indigenous MLAs elected in the 2023 election. Following his election, he became Parliamentary Secretary for Indigenous Policing. He was the UCP's only Indigenous candidate in the 2023 election.

On March 7, 2025, Sinclair was removed from the UCP caucus over comments made criticizing that year's budget.

In July 2025, along with Peter Guthrie, Sinclair announced plans to form a new political party in the name of the Progressive Conservatives. Later that month, it was announced that Sinclair and Guthrie would be joining the Alberta Party and rebranding it as the Progressive Conservative Party. However, he never ended up joining the newly-formed Progressive Tory Party of Alberta. In early May 2026, Sinclair returned to the UCP caucus.

== Electoral history ==
=== 2023 general election ===
2023 Alberta general election: Lesser Slave Lake
Party	Candidate	Votes	%	±%
United Conservative	Scott Sinclair	5,171	65.04	+7.35
New Democratic	Danielle Larivee	2,636	33.15	-2.95
Solidarity Movement	Bert Seatter	144	1.81	–
Total		7,951	99.36	–
Rejected and declined		51	0.64	
Turnout		8,002	49.03	
Eligible voters		16,322		
United Conservative hold		Swing		+5.15
Source(s) Source: Elections Alberta

=== 2023 UCP Lesser Slave Lake nomination contest ===
February 25–26, 2023

Candidate	Round 1		Round 2		Round 3	
Candidate	Votes	%	Votes	%	Votes	%
Scott Sinclair	230	42.0	235	45.7	246	50.5
Martine Carifelle	231	42.2	231	44.9	241	49.5
Jerrad Cunningham	47	8.6	48	9.3	Eliminated	
Silas Yellowknee	40	7.3	Eliminated			
Total	548	100.00	514	100.00	487	100.00
