= Danielle Larivee =

Canadian politician (born 1974)

The Honourable Danielle Larivee ECA
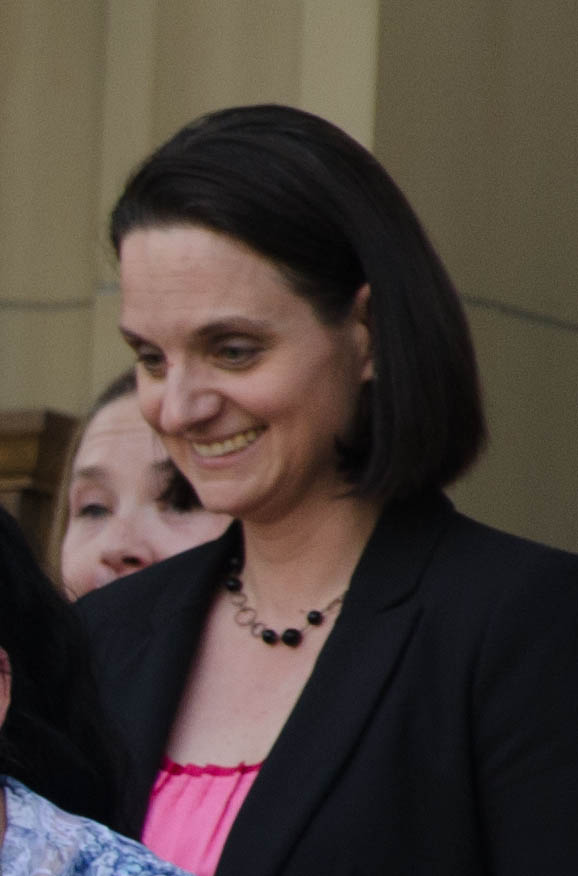
- Larivee in May 2015

Alberta Minister of Children's Services
- In office January 19, 2017 – April 30, 2019
- Preceded by: Lyle Oberg
- Succeeded by: Rebecca Schulz

Member of the Legislative Assembly of Alberta for Lesser Slave Lake
- In office May 5, 2015 – March 19, 2019
- Preceded by: Pearl Calahasen
- Succeeded by: Pat Rehn

Personal details
- Born: May 11, 1974 (age 52)
- Party: Alberta New Democratic Party
- Occupation: Public Health Nurse

Danielle Marie Larivee ECA (born May 11, 1974) is a Canadian politician who was elected in the 2015 Alberta general election to the Legislative Assembly of Alberta representing the electoral district of Lesser Slave Lake. She defeated incumbent Progressive Conservative MLA Pearl Calahasen, who had served the district since 1989 and was the longest serving incumbent. She is a public health nurse. In 2019 Larivee ran as a candidate in the Alberta election for Lesser Slave Lake and lost to Pat Rehn who belonged to the United Conservative Party (UCP).

Larivee was named to the cabinet as Minister of Municipal Affairs and the Minister in Charge of Service Alberta on October 22, 2015. On January 19, 2017, Larivee was named Minister of the new Ministry of Child Services, a portfolio previously held by Irfan Sabir. Sabir was retained as the Minister for Community and Social Services. Shaye Anderson was named as the new Minister of Municipal Affairs, filling the vacancy created by Larivee's new appointment. On June 18, 2018, Alberta premier at the time Rachel Notley introduced Larivee role as the Children's Services Minister as well as the minister for the status of women

Larivee subsequently lost her bid at re-election in 2019 to UCP candidate Pat Rehn. Following this, she was elected as the First Vice-President of the United Nurses of Alberta in the fall of 2019.

She was the NDP candidate for Lesser Slave Lake for the NDP in the 2023 Alberta general election, but finished in second place.

Larivee endorsed Alberta MP Heather McPherson in the 2026 New Democratic Party leadership election.

== Electoral history ==
=== 2023 general election ===
2023 Alberta general election: Lesser Slave Lake
Party	Candidate	Votes	%	±%
United Conservative	Scott Sinclair	5,171	65.04	+7.35
New Democratic	Danielle Larivee	2,636	33.15	-2.95
Solidarity Movement	Bert Seatter	144	1.81	–
Total		7,951	99.36	–
Rejected and declined		51	0.64	
Turnout		8,002	49.03	
Eligible voters		16,322		
United Conservative hold		Swing		+5.15
Source(s) Source: Elections Alberta

=== 2019 general election ===
2019 Alberta general election: Lesser Slave Lake
Party	Candidate	Votes	%	±%
United Conservative	Pat Rehn	5,873	57.59	+0.62
New Democratic	Danielle Larivee	3,676	36.11	-6.83
Alberta Party	Vincent Rain	381	3.74	–
Alberta Independence	Suzette Powder	251	2.47	–
Total valid votes		10,181	99.43	–
Rejected, spoiled, and declined		58	0.57	–
Turnout		10,239	63.38	–
Eligible electors		16,164	–	
United Conservative notional hold		Swing		+3.72
Source(s) Source: "70 - Lesser Slave Lake 2019 General Election Results". Elections Alberta.

=== 2015 general election ===
2015 Alberta general election: Lesser Slave Lake
Party	Candidate	Votes	%	±%
New Democratic	Danielle Larivee	3,915	43.23%	+37.32%
Wildrose	Darryl Boisson	3,198	35.31%	-4.11%
Progressive Conservative	Pearl Calahasen	1,944	21.46%	-27.25%
Total valid votes		9,057	100.00%	
Rejected, spoiled and declined		50		
Eligible voters / turnout		20,277	44.91%	+6.07%
New Democratic gain from Progressive Conservative		Swing		+32.29%
Source(s) "2015 Provincial General Election Results". Elections Alberta. Archived from the original on 2022-03-30.
