= Pat Rehn =

Canadian politician (born 1965/66)

Member of the Legislative Assembly of Alberta for Lesser Slave Lake
- In office April 16, 2019 – May 29, 2023
- Preceded by: Danielle Larivee
- Succeeded by: Scott Sinclair

Personal details
- Born: 1965 or 1966 (age 59–60)
- Party: United Conservative Party
- Education: University of Alberta
- Occupation: Businessman

Pat Rehn (born 1965 or 1966) is a Canadian politician who was elected in the 2019 Alberta general election to represent the electoral district of Lesser Slave Lake in the 30th Alberta Legislature. Elected as a member of the United Conservative Party (UCP), he was removed from caucus and banned from running for the party after a history of alleged poor representation of his constituency and ignoring public health advisories against non-essential international travel during the COVID-19 pandemic in Alberta. He later rejoined caucus after an internal caucus vote.

UCP MLA Pat Rehn announced Jan. 14, 2023, that he will not be running for re-election for the Lesser Slave Lake seat in the 2023 Alberta general election.

== Travel controversy ==
In December 2020, Rehn travelled to Xplor Park in Playa Del Carmen, Mexico for the holidays contrary to provincial public health advice to avoid non-essential travel during the COVID-19 pandemic in Alberta. Premier Jason Kenney demoted Rehn from his legislative committee duties as a result.

On January 5, 2021, the Slave Lake Town Council wrote an open letter to Rehn demanding his resignation from the Legislative Assembly of Alberta. The letter alleged Rehn, among other reasons listed, no longer lived in the constituency, cared more about his business interests in Texas, and frequently missed or was ill-prepared for meetings between provincial and local officials and therefore failed to adequately represent the community or its residents. In response, Rehn accused the council of sowing political division, acknowledged that his holiday travel decisions were poor, defended his local connections citing prior work history and current home ownership, and defended visiting Texas multiple times in the past year to handle "essential business matters". Rehn did not address the allegations about missing government meetings about local issues.

On January 13, the High Prairie town council signed a letter to Rehn and Kenney criticizing Rehn's lack of presence in his riding and demanding Rehn improve his local representation. The same day, Big Lakes County town council discussed Rehn's conduct at a closed door meeting. In the same week, Rehn's expense claims for the first two quarters of 2020 became public, and showed that he spent little time in his constituency, claiming meal per diems in Edmonton for all but two days in May when the legislature only sat for five days because of the pandemic, most days in June, and all of July.

On January 14, 2021, Kenney announced that Rehn had been removed from the UCP caucus and would sit as an independent, saying that Rehn "has made no meaningful effort to work in his constituency, or properly to represent his hard-working constituents" and had ignored previous internal calls to improve his local representation. Rehn was also barred from running for any future UCP nominations.

In March 2021, MLA Recall legislation was introduced by the UCP government. This was something called for in the wake of Rehn and other UCP caucus members travelling during the holidays.

== Electoral history ==
2019 Alberta general election: Lesser Slave Lake
Party	Candidate	Votes	%	±%
United Conservative	Pat Rehn	5,873	57.59	+0.62
New Democratic	Danielle Larivee	3,676	36.11	-6.83
Alberta Party	Vincent Rain	381	3.74	–
Alberta Independence	Suzette Powder	251	2.47	–
Total valid votes		10,181	99.43	–
Rejected, spoiled, and declined		58	0.57	–
Turnout		10,239	63.38	–
Eligible electors		16,164	–	
United Conservative notional hold		Swing		+3.72
Source(s) Source: "70 - Lesser Slave Lake 2019 General Election Results". Elections Alberta.
