= Dennis Barton =

Canadian politician (1939–2022)

Dennis M. Barton

Member of the Legislative Assembly of Alberta
- In office 1971–1975
- Preceded by: New district
- Succeeded by: Larry Shaben
- Constituency: Lesser Slave Lake

Personal details
- Born: September 14, 1939
- Died: February 27, 2022 (aged 82)
- Party: Social Credit
- Occupation: politician

Dennis M. Barton (14 September 1939 – 27 February 2022) was a provincial level politician from Alberta, Canada. He served as a member of the Legislative Assembly of Alberta from 1971 to 1975 sitting with the Social Credit caucus in official opposition.

== Political career ==
Barton ran for a seat to the Alberta Legislature in the 1971 Alberta general election. He ran in the new electoral district of Lesser Slave Lake as a candidate for the Social Credit party. Barton defeated four other candidates in a hotly contested race to pick up the new district for his party despite it losing government in that election.

Barton ran for his second term in office in the 1975 Alberta general election. His popular vote in the three way race was cut in half. He was easily defeated by Progressive Conservative candidate Larry Shaben finishing a distant second place.
