= Pearl Calahasen =

Canadian politician (born 1952)

The Honourable Pearl Calahasen ECA
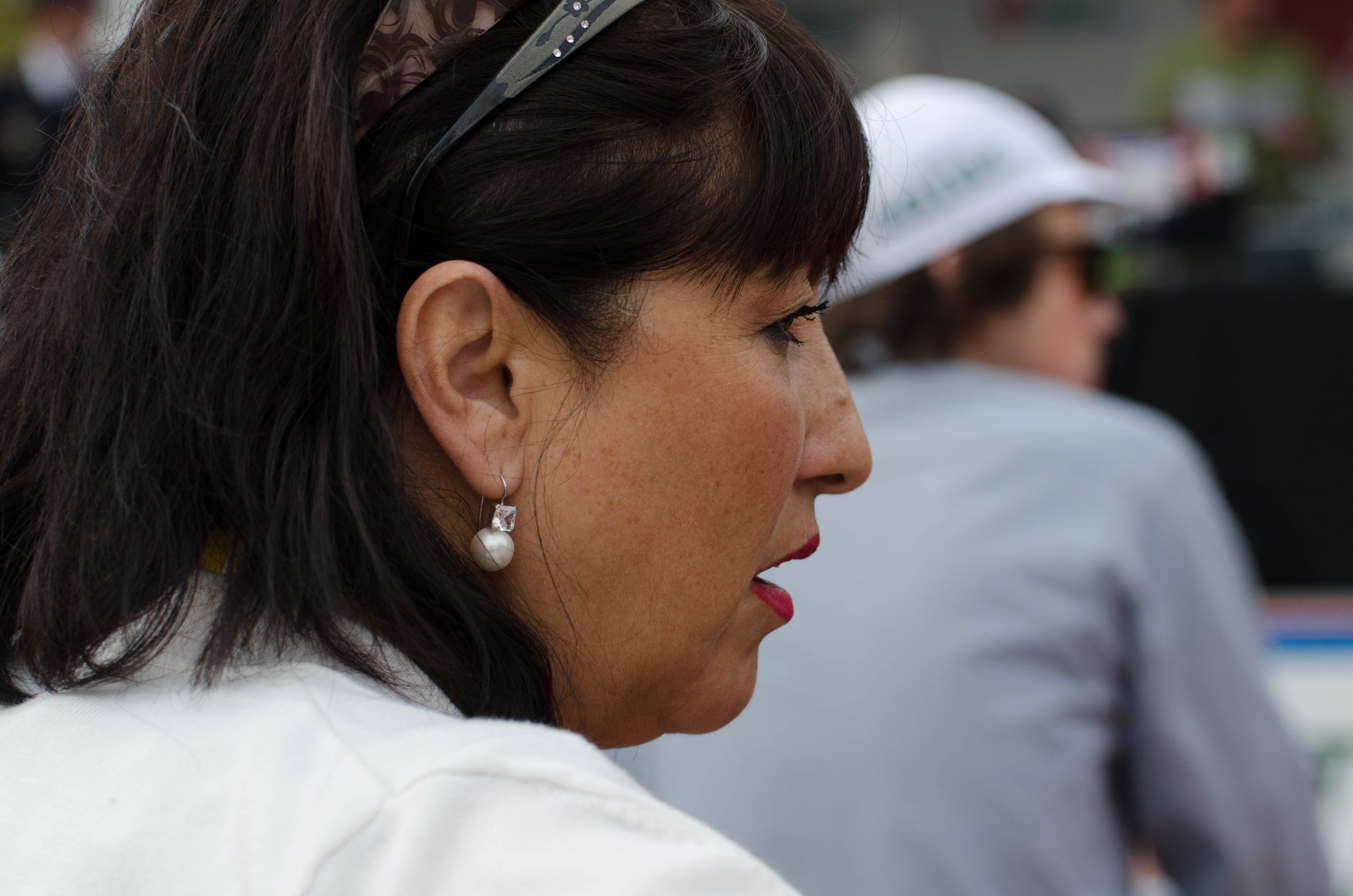

Member of the Legislative Assembly of Alberta for Lesser Slave Lake
- In office 20 March 1989 – 5 May 2015
- Preceded by: Larry Shaben
- Succeeded by: Danielle Larivee

Alberta Minister of Aboriginal Affairs and Northern Development
- In office 15 March 2001 – 15 December 2006
- Preceded by: Ministry Established
- Succeeded by: Guy Boutilier

Alberta Associate Minister of Aboriginal Affairs
- In office 26 May 1999 – 15 March 2001
- Succeeded by: Ministry Abolished

Alberta Minister without Portfolio in charge of Children's Services
- In office 31 May 1996 – 26 May 1999
- Succeeded by: Iris Evans

Personal details
- Born: 5 December 1952 (age 73) Grouard, Alberta
- Party: Progressive Conservative
- Education: University of Alberta; University of Oregon

Pearl Calahasen ECA (born 5 December 1952) is a Canadian politician, who represented the electoral district of Lesser Slave Lake in the Legislative Assembly of Alberta from 1989 to 2015. A member of the Progressive Conservative party and former cabinet minister (holding the positions of Minister without Portfolio in charge of Children's Services, Associate Minister of Aboriginal Affairs, and Minister of Aboriginal Affairs and Northern Development).

Calahasen was the first Métis woman elected to public office in Alberta, and, after the 2012 Alberta election, she was Alberta's longest currently-serving MLA.

== Early life ==
Calahasen was born in 1952 and raised in Grouard, Alberta. She attended the University of Alberta, from which she received a Bachelor of Education, and the University of Oregon, from which she received a master's degree. She is a member of the Métis Nation of Alberta.

== Political career ==
=== Electoral record ===
Calahasen first sought election in the 1989 Alberta election, when she ran as the Progressive Conservative candidates in the riding of Lesser Slave Lake. She won a plurality of votes, capturing 47.6% and defeating her nearest rival, Liberal Denise Wahlstrom, by nearly one thousand votes. This was the closest election of her political career to date; in subsequent elections, she won shares of the votes ranging from 55.5% (in the 1993 election) to 74.2% (in the 2001 election).

At the time of her election in 1989, Calahasen was the first Métis woman elected to public office in Alberta.

=== Cabinet roles ===
Calahasen served as a backbencher in Ralph Klein's government until 1996, when Klein appointed her Minister without Portfolio responsible for Children's Services. She served in this capacity until 1999, when she was shuffled to the position of Associate Minister of Aboriginal Affairs. In 2001 she was promoted to full minister, of Aboriginal Affairs and Northern Development. Calahasen initially supported Lyle Oberg in the 2006 P.C. leadership election, but switched her endorsement to Ed Stelmach after Oberg dropped off the ballot; despite this support, she was not included in Stelmach's cabinet once he became premier in 2006.

=== Legislative initiatives ===
Calahasen has sponsored a number of bills over her career in the legislature.

==== As a backbencher ====
Despite not being a member of cabinet, in 1990, Calahasen sponsored the Metis Settlements Act, a government bill which incorporated Métis settlements as a new class of municipality. It passed with the support of the opposition, although New Democrat Bob Hawkesworth expressed concern that the settlements were not given sufficient autonomy from government. The same year, she sponsored the Nechi Community College Act, a private bill that would have established the Nechi Community College but did not reach second reading.

In 1995, Calahasen sponsored the Colin Chor Wee Chew Legal Articles Act, another private bill which didn't progress to second reading. She also sponsored the Public Health Amendment Act, designed to allow nurse practitioners to fulfill some of the functions of doctors in communities in which doctors were in short supply. The bill passed with the support of the opposition Liberals, but some members, including Terry Kirkland, Colleen Soetaert, Percy Wickman, Gary Dickson, Lance White, and Howard Sapers, argued that the bill left out too many details and left the details in the realm of legislation, inappropriately empowering bureaucrats at the expense of the legislature.

==== As a minister ====
As Associate Minister of Aboriginal Affairs, Calahasen sponsored the First Nations Sacred Ceremonial Objects Repatriation Act, a 2000 government bill that allowed for the repatriation of First Nations artifacts. It passed with full opposition support.

In 2012, she became the longest-serving MLA in Alberta's history, surpassing the previous record held by Cornelia Wood.

== Election results ==
=== 1989 general election ===
1989 Alberta general election: Lesser Slave Lake
Party	Candidate	Votes	%	±%
Progressive Conservative	Pearl Calahasen	3,249	47.58%	-9.62%
Liberal	Denise Wahlstrom	2,286	33.47%	
New Democratic	Philip Lukken	1,294	18.95%	-23.85%
Total		6,829	100.00%	
Rejected, spoiled and declined		9		
Eligible electors / Turnout		12,074	56.63%	+17.38%
Progressive Conservative hold		Swing		-16.74%
Source(s) "Lesser Slave Lake Official Results 1989 Alberta general election". Alberta Heritage Community Foundation.

=== 1993 general election ===
1993 Alberta general election: Lesser Slave Lake
Party	Candidate	Votes	%	±%
Progressive Conservative	Pearl Calahasen	4,260	55.48%	+7.90%
Liberal	Denise Wahlstrom	3,093	40.28%	+6.81%
New Democratic	Larry Sakaluk	326	4.24%	-14.71%
Total		7,679	100.00%	
Rejected, spoiled and declined		24		
Eligible electors / Turnout		12,743	60.48%	+3.85%
Progressive Conservative hold		Swing		+7.36%
Source(s) "Lesser Slave Lake Official Results 1993 Alberta general election". Alberta Heritage Community Foundation.

=== 1997 general election ===
1997 Alberta general election: Lesser Slave Lake
Party	Candidate	Votes	%	±%
Progressive Conservative	Pearl Calahasen	3,389	60.58%	+5.10%
Liberal	Ralph Chalifoux	1,139	20.36%	-19.92%
Social Credit	Robert Alford	624	11.16%	
New Democratic	Glenn Laboucan	442	7.90%	+3.66%
Total		5,594	100.00%	
Rejected, spoiled and declined		23		
Eligible electors / Turnout		13,368	42.09%	-18.39%
Progressive Conservative hold		Swing		+12.51%
Source(s) "1997 general election". Elections Alberta. Archived from the original on 14 February 2012.

=== 2001 general election ===
2001 Alberta general election: Lesser Slave Lake
Party	Candidate	Votes	%	±%
Progressive Conservative	Pearl Calahasen	4,766	74.16%	+13.58%
Liberal	Rick Noel	1,429	22.23%	+1.87%
New Democratic	Doris Bannister	232	3.61%	-4.29%
Total		6,427	100.00%	
Rejected, spoiled and declined		47		
Eligible electors / Turnout		14,185	45.64%	+3.55%
Progressive Conservative hold		Swing		+7.73%
Source(s) "Lesser Slave Lake Official Results 2001 Alberta general election" (PDF). Elections Alberta.

=== 2004 general election ===
2004 Alberta general election: Lesser Slave Lake
Party	Candidate	Votes	%	±%
Progressive Conservative	Pearl Calahasen	3,903	64.94%	-9.22%
Alberta Alliance	Valerie Rahn	969	16.12%	
Liberal	Jonathan Plackaitis	530	8.82%	-13.41%
New Democratic	Doris Bannister	354	5.89%	2.28%
Greens	Ian Hopfe	254	4.23%	
Total		6,010	100.00%	
Rejected, spoiled and declined		57		
Eligible electors / Turnout		19,259	31.50%	-14.14%
Progressive Conservative hold		Swing		-12.67%
Source(s) "Lesser Slave Lake Statement of Official Results 2004 Alberta general election" (PDF). Elections Alberta.

=== 2008 general election ===
2008 Alberta general election: Lesser Slave Lake
Party	Candidate	Votes	%	±%
Progressive Conservative	Pearl Calahasen	3,384	65.18%	+0.24%
Liberal	Steve Noskey	1,109	21.36%	+12.54%
New Democratic	Habby Sharkawi	426	8.21%	+2.32%
Greens	Bonnie Raho	273	5.26%	+1.03%
Total		5,192	100.00%	
Rejected, spoiled and declined		43		
Eligible electors / Turnout		20,310	25.78%	-5.72%
Progressive Conservative hold		Swing		-6.39%
Source(s) The Report on the March 3, 2008 Provincial General Election of the Twenty-seventh Legislative Assembly. Elections Alberta. 28 July 2008. pp. 462–467.

=== 2012 general election ===
2012 Alberta general election: Lesser Slave Lake
Party	Candidate	Votes	%	±%
Progressive Conservative	Pearl Calahasen	3,518	48.71%	-16.47%
Wildrose	Darryl Boisson	2,847	39.42%	
New Democratic	Steve Kaz	427	5.91%	-2.30%
Liberal	Steven Townsend	235	3.25%	-9.29%
Independent	Donald G. Bissell	195	2.70%	
Total		7,222	100.00%	
Rejected, spoiled and declined		50		
Eligible electors / Turnout		18,723	38.84%	+13.06%
Progressive Conservative hold		Swing		-27.95%
Source(s) "Electoral Division Results: Lesser Slave Lake".

=== 2015 general election ===
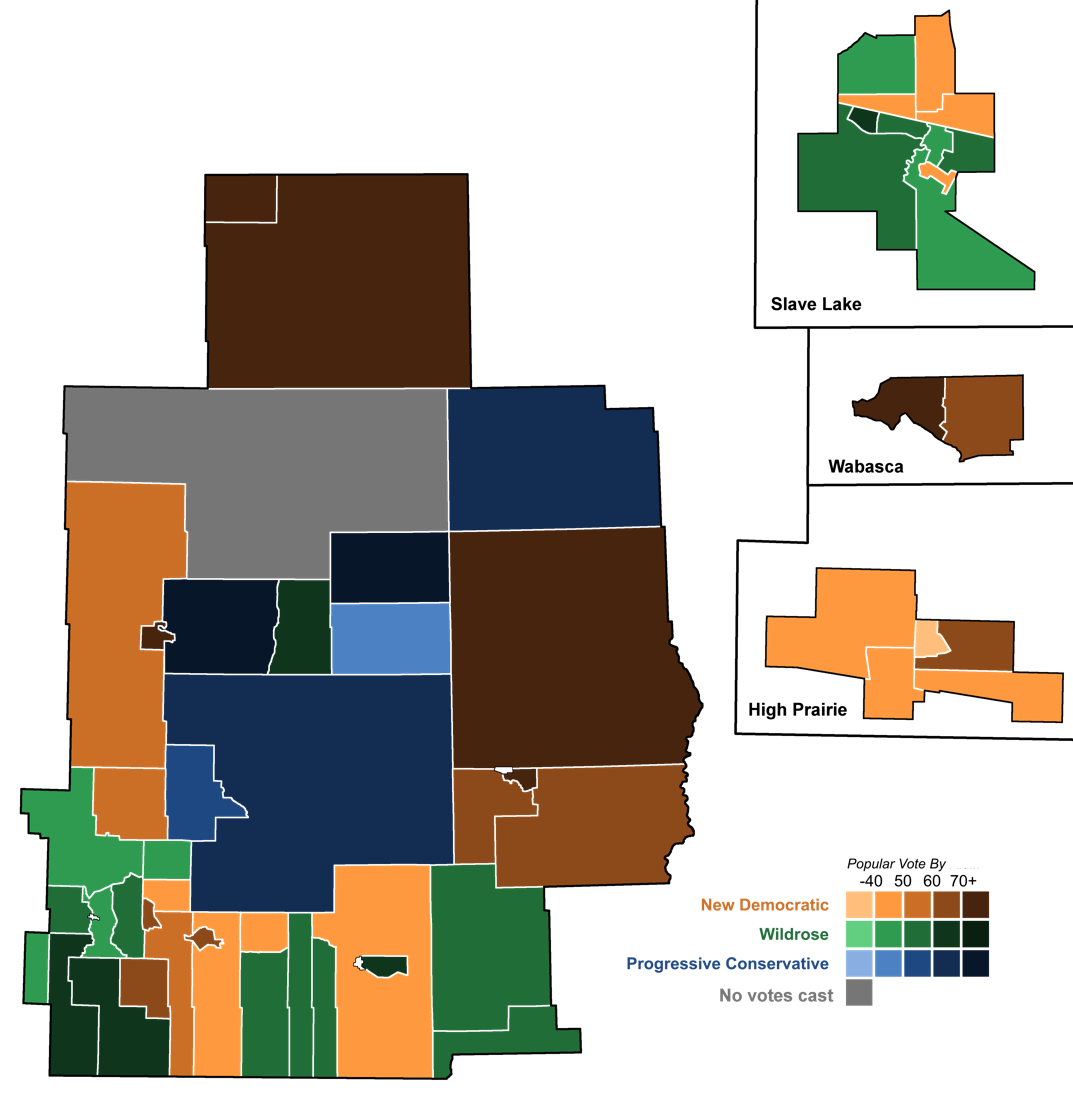
results by polling division, 2015

2015 Alberta general election: Lesser Slave Lake
Party	Candidate	Votes	%	±%
New Democratic	Danielle Larivee	3,915	43.23%	+37.32%
Wildrose	Darryl Boisson	3,198	35.31%	-4.11%
Progressive Conservative	Pearl Calahasen	1,944	21.46%	-27.25%
Total valid votes		9,057	100.00%	
Rejected, spoiled and declined		50		
Eligible voters / turnout		20,277	44.91%	+6.07%
New Democratic gain from Progressive Conservative		Swing		+32.29%
Source(s) "2015 Provincial General Election Results". Elections Alberta. Archived from the original on 30 March 2022.

Alberta provincial government of Ralph Klein
Cabinet posts (3)
Predecessor	Office	Successor
	Minister without portfolio responsible for Children's Services; 1996–1999; Iris Evans was given the title "Minister of Children's Services" rather than being considered a minister without portfolio.	Iris Evans
	Associate Minister of Aboriginal Affairs; 1999–2001	Position abolished
New portfolio	Minister of Aboriginal Affairs and Northern Development; 2001–2006	Guy Boutilier
