= 2023 Alberta general election =

Provincial election in Canada

- May 29, 2023

All 87 seats in the Legislative Assembly of Alberta 44 seats needed for a majority
- Opinion polls
- Turnout: 59.5% (▼8.0pp)
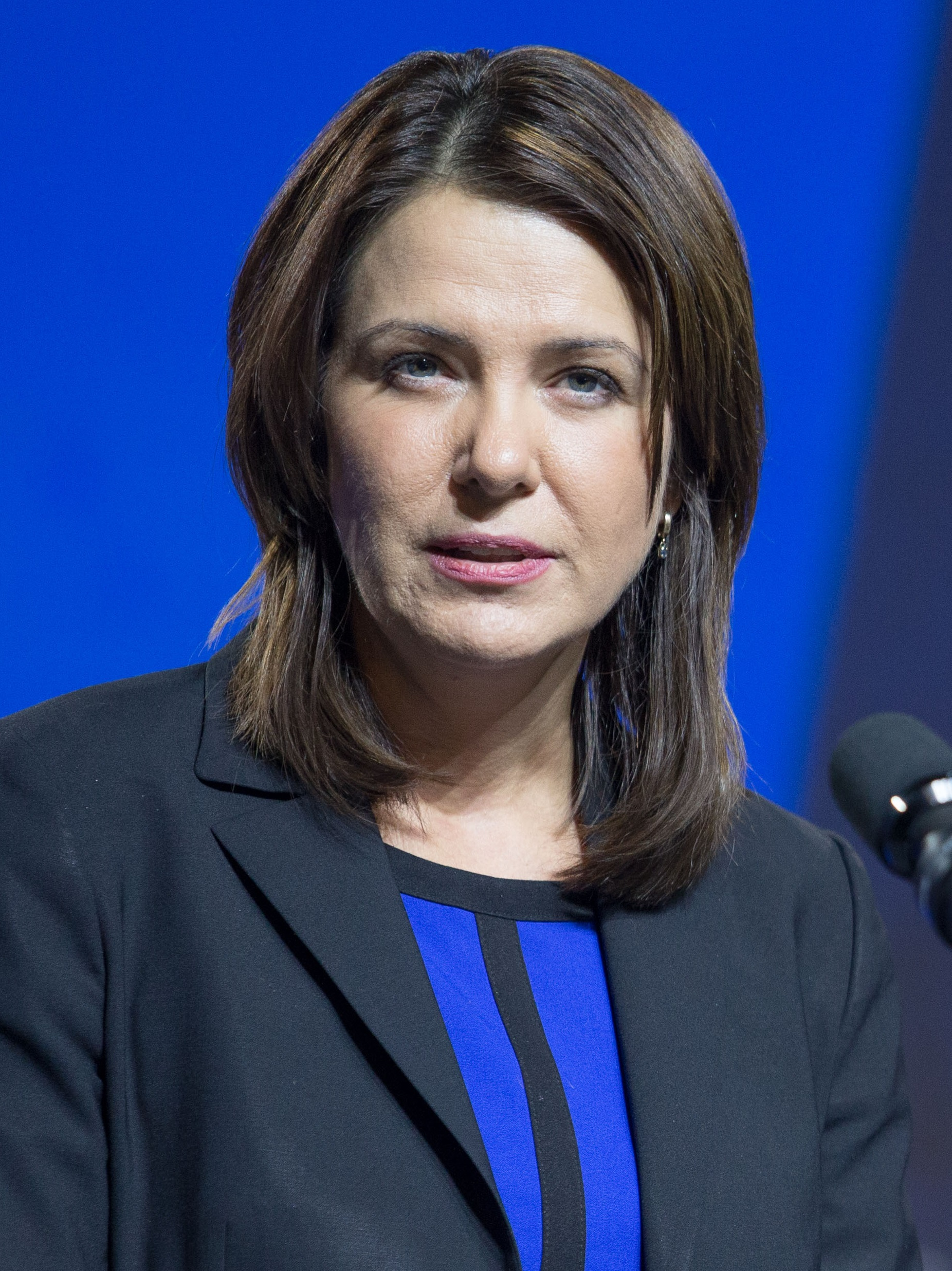

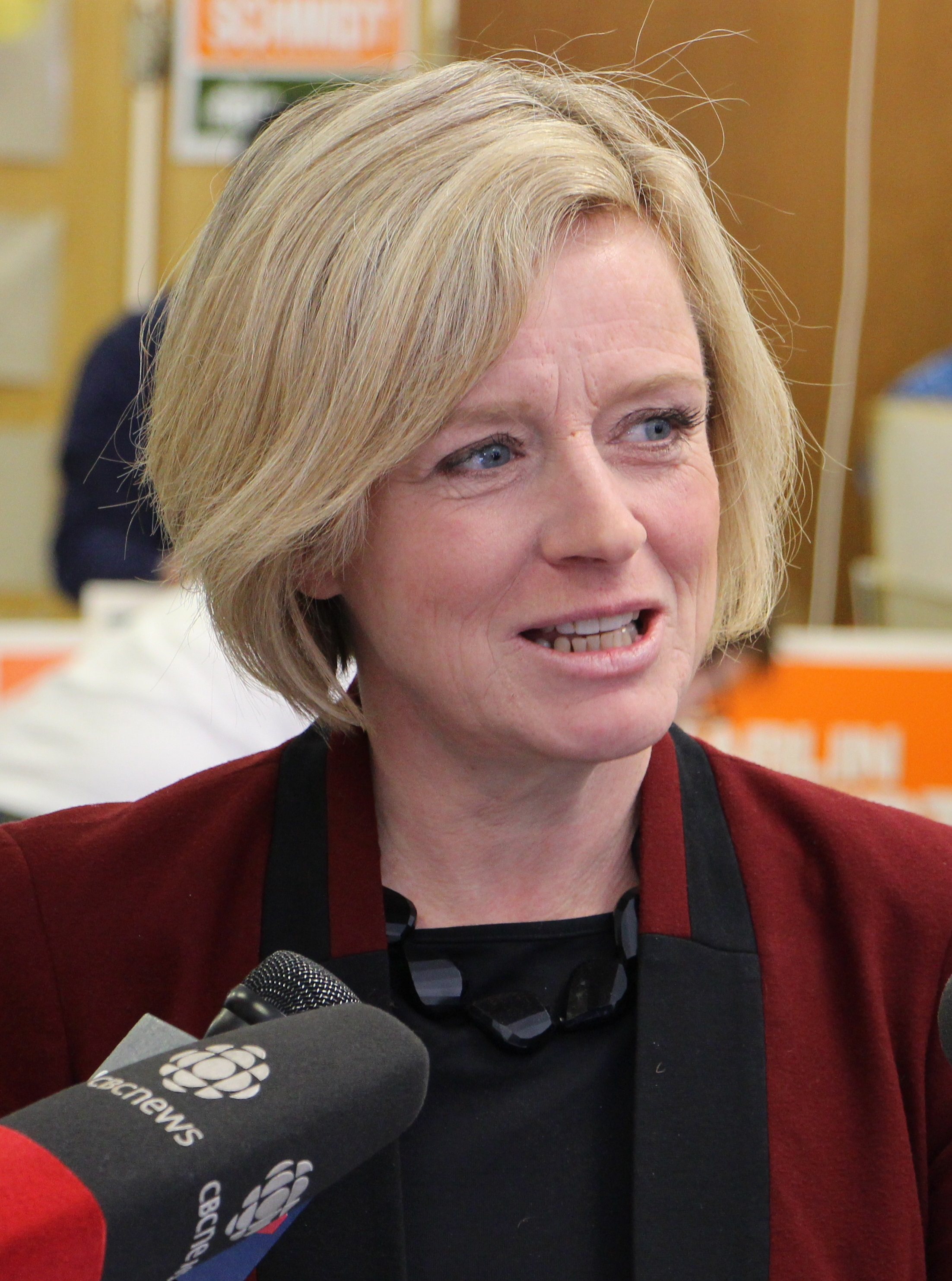
	First party	Second party
Leader	Danielle Smith	Rachel Notley
Party	United Conservative	New Democratic
Leader since	October 6, 2022	October 18, 2014
Leader's seat	Brooks-Medicine Hat	Edmonton-Strathcona
Last election	63 seats, 54.87%	24 seats, 32.69%
Seats before	60	23
Seats won	49 (Note: Includes Jennifer Johnson, who appeared on the ballot as a UCP candidate but was disavowed by the party during the campaign. She sat as an independent until October 2024 when she was allowed to rejoin the UCP caucus.)	38
Seat change	▼11	▲15
Popular vote	928,900	777,404
Percentage	52.63%	44.05%
Swing	▼2.23pp	▲11.36pp
- 2023 Alberta General Election Map
Premier before election
Danielle Smith
United Conservative
Premier after election
Danielle Smith
United Conservative

The 2023 Alberta general election was held on May 29, 2023. Voters elected the members of the 31st Alberta Legislature. The United Conservative Party under Danielle Smith, the incumbent Premier of Alberta, was re-elected to a second term with a reduced majority. Across the province, 1,763,441 valid votes were cast in the election.

The writs of election were issued on May 1, triggering the campaign. This was the first election following 2021 amendments to Alberta's Election Act which had set the date of the election to the last Monday of May, subject to the lieutenant governor's usual authority to dissolve the legislature sooner in accordance with the conventions of the Westminster system. This made it the first fixed-date election in Alberta.

== Background ==
The 2019 Alberta general election resulted in a majority government for the United Conservative Party led by Jason Kenney. The election of the new United Conservative government was widely predicted by pollsters and academics during the campaign. The United Conservatives captured 54.88 per cent of the popular vote and won 63 of the 87 seats in the Alberta Legislature. The incumbent New Democratic Party, led by Premier Rachel Notley, experienced a drop in its popular vote share from 40.62 per cent in the 2015 Alberta general election to 32.67 per cent, and formed the Official Opposition with 24 seats. The Alberta Party, led by former Edmonton mayor Stephen Mandel, received 9.08 per cent of the popular vote but failed to win any seats in the legislature. Various other parties and independent candidates combined for 3.37 per cent of the popular vote, without gaining any seats in the legislature. Journalist Graham Thomson described the 2019 election campaign as "more vicious, more personal, and more divisive" than any other campaign in Alberta's history.

The United Conservatives were formed through the merger of the two major conservative parties in Alberta, the Progressive Conservative Association of Alberta and the Wildrose Party, in 2017. Jason Kenney, a former member of Parliament and minister in Stephen Harper's Conservative Party of Canada federal government, won the 2017 Progressive Conservative Association of Alberta leadership election on a platform of uniting the right-wing parties in Alberta. The merger took place after 95 per cent of Wildrose Party members voted in favour of joining the new United Conservative Party and forming the Official Opposition. In the same year, Jason Kenney won the 2017 United Conservative Party leadership election and became the leader of the Opposition.

Initially, the Kenney government enjoyed substantial support among Albertans, with an approval rating of 60 per cent in June 2019. Kenney's approval rating started to decline with the onset of the COVID-19 pandemic in Alberta, dropping below 50 per cent in February 2020 and falling further to below 33 per cent by June 2021. Growing dissatisfaction within the United Conservative Party led to calls for a leadership review, with discontent primarily centred around the Kenney government's handling of the COVID-19 pandemic. As a result, Central Peace-Notley MLA Todd Loewen resigned, and the United Conservative Caucus voted to expel both Loewen and Cypress-Medicine Hat MLA Drew Barnes on May 13, 2021. On May 18, 2022, Kenney announced his intention to resign as the leader of the United Conservative Party, after receiving only 51.4 per cent support during the party's leadership review.

The 2022 United Conservative Party leadership election was held on October 6. Former Wildrose Party leader Danielle Smith returned to politics and defeated five other candidates to become the party leader. After being sworn in as the premier of Alberta on October 11, the Smith ministry was presented on October 21. On May 1, 2023, acting on the premier's advice, the lieutenant governor dissolved the legislature and called an election for May 29.

=== Procedure ===
Procedures for provincial elections in Alberta are governed by the Election Act, and financial regulatory aspects are governed under the Election Finances and Contributions Disclosure Act. Eligibility to vote in 2023 was limited to Canadian citizens aged 18 years of age or older, and who was an ordinary resident of an Alberta electoral district.

Under the Election Finances and Contributions Disclosure Act, total expenses by political parties were limited to a total of $3,208,127 during the election period from when the writ was dropped to the election day, which was $1.16 per registered elector. Individual candidates expenses were limited to $53,100 during the election period. Third-party advertisers were limited to $159,200 during the election period.

In 2021, the Alberta Legislature passed the Election Statutes Amendment Act, 2021 (No. 2), which amended both the electoral acts to fix the election date to be the last Monday in May unless the lieutenant governor dissolves the Legislature sooner. The bill raised total election expense limits for each political party from $2 million to a formula of $1.16 per elector, which was expected to be near $3.2 million. The bill also prohibited an entity from registering as a third-party advertiser if someone who is a affiliated with a political party holds a "significant position" on in the entity.

=== Electoral system ===
Alberta's 87 MLAs are elected through single-member contests by plurality, also known as first past the post.

=== Incumbents not standing for re-election ===
In the months leading up to the 2023 Alberta general election, several members of the Legislative Assembly announced they would not seek re-election. This included three members of the Smith ministry including leadership contest runner-up Travis Toews (Minister of Finance and president of Treasury Board), Sonya Savage (Minister of Environment and Protected Areas), and Rajan Sawhney (Minister of Trade, Immigration and Multiculturalism). Shortly after Sawhney's decision not to run again, she was nominated by Smith as the United Conservative candidate for Calgary-North West. Other United Conservative members of the Legislative Assembly who decided not to run again included former Ministers in the Kenney ministry: Leela Aheer, Ron Orr, Tracy Allard, and Brad Rutherford; as well as caucus members Mark Smith, Roger Reid, and Richard Gotfried. Dave Hanson, member for Bonnyville-Cold Lake-St. Paul, lost his nomination contest against former Bonnyville-Cold Lake representative Scott Cyr; and Tany Yao, member for Fort McMurray-Wood Buffalo, lost his nomination contest to Zulkifl Mujahid, who was subsequently removed by the provincial board and replaced by Yao due to ongoing legal matters.

New Democratic members of the Legislative Assembly deciding not to run in 2023 included members of the Notley ministry, such as Deron Bilous, along with Richard Feehan, as well as caucus member Jon Carson. Chris Nielsen, member for Edmonton-Decore, lost his nomination contest to Sharif Haji. Two independent members of the Legislative Assembly decided not to run in 2023: former New Democrat Thomas Dang, along with former United Conservative Drew Barnes.

MLAs who did not run again in 2023
Retiring incumbent		Electoral district	Subsequent party nominee	Elected MLA
Thomas Dang	Independent (Note: Dang was elected in the 2019 election as an NDP candidate but later became an independent MLA.)	Edmonton-South	Rhiannon Hoyle	Rhiannon Hoyle
Deron Bilous	New Democratic	Edmonton-Beverly-Clareview	Peggy Wright	Peggy Wright
Jon Carson	New Democratic	Edmonton-West Henday	Brooks Arcand-Paul	Brooks Arcand-Paul
Richard Feehan	New Democratic	Edmonton-Rutherford	Jodi Calahoo Stonehouse	Jodi Calahoo Stonehouse
Drew Barnes	Independent (Note: Barnes was elected in the 2019 election as a UCP candidate but later became an independent MLA.)	Cypress-Medicine Hat	Justin Wright	Justin Wright
Leela Aheer	United Conservative	Chestermere-Strathmore	Chantelle de Jonge	Chantelle de Jonge
Richard Gotfried	United Conservative	Calgary-Fish Creek	Myles McDougall	Myles McDougall
Ron Orr	United Conservative	Lacombe-Ponoka	Jennifer Johnson (Note: Johnson will not caucus with the UCP due to her comments on trans youth.)	Jennifer Johnson
Pat Rehn	United Conservative	Lesser Slave Lake	Scott Sinclair	Scott Sinclair
Roger Reid	United Conservative	Livingstone-Macleod	Chelsae Petrovic	Chelsae Petrovic
Brad Rutherford	United Conservative	Leduc-Beaumont	Brandon Lunty	Brandon Lunty
Mark Smith	United Conservative	Drayton Valley-Devon	Andrew Boitchenko	Andrew Boitchenko
Sonya Savage	United Conservative	Calgary-North West	Rajan Sawhney	Rajan Sawhney
Rajan Sawhney (Note: Though Sawhney initially declared that she would not seek re-election in her own riding of Calgary-North East, she was later appointed the UCP candidate in Calgary-North West.)	United Conservative	Calgary-North East	Inder Grewal	Gurinder Brar
Travis Toews	United Conservative	Grande Prairie-Wapiti	Ron Wiebe	Ron Wiebe
Tracy Allard	United Conservative	Grande Prairie	Nolan Dyck	Nolan Dyck

MLAs that lost nomination races
Outgoing incumbent		Electoral district	Subsequent party nominee	Elected MLA
Dave Hanson	United Conservative	Bonnyville-Cold Lake-St. Paul	Scott Cyr	Scott Cyr
Chris Nielsen	New Democratic	Edmonton-Decore	Sharif Haji	Sharif Haji
Tany Yao	United Conservative	Fort McMurray-Wood Buffalo	Tany Yao (Note: Yao originally lost the UCP nomination to Zulkifl Mujahid in December 2022; after Mujahid was disqualified in April 2023, Yao was appointed the UCP candidate in his place.)	Tany Yao

== Timeline ==
=== 2019 ===
- April 16: The United Conservative Party (UCP) wins a majority government in the 30th Alberta general election, defeating the previous Alberta New Democratic Party (NDP) government which had governed since 2015. No other parties won seats in the election.
- April 30: Jason Kenney is sworn in as the 18th premier of Alberta. The first UCP cabinet is likewise sworn in. Derek Fildebrandt resigns as leader of the Freedom Conservative Party of Alberta.
- May 21: Olds-Didsbury-Three Hills MLA Nathan Cooper is elected Speaker of the Legislative Assembly.
- June 30: Stephen Mandel resigns as leader of the Alberta Party.
- September 4: Cheryle Chagnon-Greyeyes resigns as leader of the Green Party of Alberta. Will Carnegie is appointed interim leader.

=== 2020 ===
- February 10: Former PC MLA Jacquie Fenske is announced as acting leader of the Alberta Party.
- March 28: Jordan Wilkie is elected leader of the Green Party of Alberta.
- June 29: Members of Wexit Alberta and the Freedom Conservative Party of Alberta voted to approve a merger into the Wildrose Independence Party of Alberta (WIP).
- July 17: The WIP announced that Paul Hinman would serve as interim leader until the party's founding convention and leadership contest.
- November 22: Alberta Liberal Party Leader David Khan resigns.

=== 2021 ===
- January 4: Six UCP MLAs are demoted by Jason Kenney for travelling internationally during the COVID-19 pandemic in Alberta.
- March 6: John Roggeveen is appointed interim leader of the Alberta Liberal Party.
- April 7: 17 UCP MLAs sign an open letter criticizing the Alberta government for reimposing more stringent public health restrictions aimed at combatting COVID-19.
- July 13: Paul Hinman is elected leader of the WIP.
- August 31: Barry Morishita is acclaimed as leader of the Alberta Party.
- November 15: 22 UCP constituency associations announce they have passed special motions calling for a review of Jason Kenney's leadership by March 1, 2022.

=== 2022 ===
- March 24: UCP MLAs Jason Stephan and Peter Guthrie call on Jason Kenney to resign.
- May 18: Jason Kenney won 51.4% of votes in favour of him staying as leader in a UCP leadership review vote. However, he announced he would resign shortly after the result was revealed.
- May 19: The UCP caucus meets and decides to keep Jason Kenney as party leader and premier until a successor is chosen.
- October 6: The results of the 2022 UCP leadership election were announced, with former Wildrose Party leader Danielle Smith elected leader and therefore the next premier. In her victory speech, she invited former UCP MLA and fellow leadership candidate Todd Loewen back into caucus.
- October 11: Danielle Smith is sworn in as the 19th premier of Alberta.
- October 21: Wildrose Independence Party leader Paul Hinman is removed as leader by a court decision. Jeevan Mangat is named interim party leader. Hinman is appealing the decision.
- December 8: John Roggeveen is appointed permanent leader of the Alberta Liberal Party.

=== 2023 ===
- May 1: Writs of election issued.
- May 6: A state of emergency is declared in Alberta due to ongoing wildfires throughout the province.
- May 18: The Alberta Ethics Commissioner released a report finding UCP leader Danielle Smith violated the Conflict of Interest Act over a conversation with Justice Minister Tyler Shandro regarding a COVID-19 prosecution.
- May 18: Smith-Notley Debate.
- May 23–27: Advance voting.
- May 29: Election day.

=== Changes in MLAs ===
Changes in seats held (2019–2023)
Seat	Before				Change		
Seat	Date	Member	Party	Reason	Date	Member	Party
Lesser Slave Lake	January 14, 2021	Pat Rehn	█ United Cons.	Removed from caucus due to lack of constituency work			█ Independent
Lesser Slave Lake	July 14, 2021	Pat Rehn	█ Independent	Returned to caucus			█ United Cons.
Central Peace-Notley	May 13, 2021	Todd Loewen	█ United Cons.	Expelled by caucus over criticism of then premier Jason Kenney's COVID-19 policies			█ Independent
Central Peace-Notley	October 7, 2022	Todd Loewen	█ Independent	Returned to caucus			█ United Cons.
Cypress-Medicine Hat	May 13, 2021	Drew Barnes	█ United Cons.	Expelled by caucus over criticism of then premier Jason Kenney's COVID-19 policies			█ Independent
Fort McMurray-Lac La Biche	August 15, 2021	Laila Goodridge	█ United Cons.	Resigned to stand for election to Fort McMurray-Cold Lake in the 2021 Canadian federal election	March 15, 2022	Brian Jean	█ United Cons.
Edmonton-South	December 21, 2021	Thomas Dang	█ New Democratic	Resigned from caucus after RCMP investigation was conducted			█ Independent
Calgary-Elbow	August 31, 2022	Doug Schweitzer	█ United Cons.	Resigned from Legislature; retired from politics for private sector			█ Vacant
Brooks-Medicine Hat	October 7, 2022	Michaela Frey	█ United Cons.	Resigned from Legislature to allow Danielle Smith to stand in a by-election	November 8, 2022	Danielle Smith	█ United Cons.
Calgary-Lougheed	November 30, 2022	Jason Kenney	█ United Cons.	Resigned from Legislature; left politics			█ Vacant

== Campaign ==
The election campaign was tense and featured a wide gulf between the two opposing parties, with an increasingly populist UCP facing a left-leaning NDP.

=== Issues ===
==== Healthcare ====
Following her selection as leader of the United Conservative Party, Danielle Smith made a number of changes to Alberta's healthcare system. Smith fired the Alberta Health Services Board of Governors, replacing the board with a single administrator. In addressing ambulance capacity, the Smith government changed non-medical patient transports, using taxis and other services to open capacity for ambulance crews. Ambulance measures came after it came to light that 9,629 ambulance shifts in Calgary were unfilled in 2022. The United Conservative Party promised to hire more obstetricians and educational support in a focus on women and children, and offered a bonus for healthcare professionals moving to Alberta. During her leadership campaign, Smith advocated for a government funded $300 Health Spending Account for all Albertans to fund services that are not covered by the province, such as dental care; however, the promise was not included in the Smith government's 2023-24 budget. Smith's previous advocacy for creating co-payments and shifting the burden of healthcare payments from the government to individuals, employers and insurance companies was criticized by the New Democratic Party.

The New Democratic Party made a number of healthcare related campaign promises, including hiring 1,500 healthcare professionals to increase the capacity of family doctors, offering $10,000 signing bonus for healthcare workers and increasing the number of healthcare spaces in post-secondary schools. The New Democratic Party included a pledge to review private health service contracts made by the Jason Kenney's government for private surgical centres and diagnostic laboratories.

==== Economy ====
During their campaign, the United Conservative Party pledged to reduce personal income taxes by introducing a new tax bracket for individuals earning below $60,000. This move creating an 8 per cent tax rate would result in a $1 billion reduction in government revenue. As an affordability measure, the United Conservatives proposed extending the fuel tax holiday, previously budgeted until June 2023, to December 2023, at an estimated cost of $570 million. Danielle Smith advocated for a non-refundable tax credit for post-secondary graduates who chose to remain in Alberta. The credit would range from $3,000 to $10,000 and was projected to cost $50 million over a four-year period. The United Conservatives pledged to extend the net-zero transition of the electricity grid, moving the federally mandated timeline of 2035 to 2050. In the lead-up to the election, Danielle Smith announced support for the construction of a $1.2 billion arena in Calgary. The provincial government would contribute $330 million towards the project if re-elected.

The New Democratic Party campaigned on a platform that emphasized no increase in personal income taxes for a four-year period and a freeze on personal insurance rates. Additionally, they made a commitment to implement the recommendations of Todd Hirsch, the former ATB Financial Chief Economist. These recommendations would establish fixed formulas for non-renewable natural resource revenue, debt, and GDP to guide future spending. Rachel Notley, the leader of the New Democratic Party, expressed her support for transitioning the electrical grid to net-zero emissions by 2035. Prior to the election, Notley pledged her support for a $200 million post-secondary campus in downtown Calgary. The intention behind this pledge was to foster innovation and promote economic diversification in the Calgary core.

==== Education ====
During the campaign, both the United Conservative Party and New Democratic Party made a conscious decision to steer clear of controversial education-related issues, such as proposed changes to the provincial curriculum and expansion of charter school funding. University of Calgary political scientist Lisa Young noted the parties avoided these topics in an effort to avoid alienating undecided voters.

Prior to the election, the United Conservative government of Jason Kenney had an education policy favouring charter schools, and undergoing a curriculum review, which was criticized by the Alberta Teachers' Association. The New Democratic Party committed to increasing funding for public education by $700 million over a four years. The funding would hire 4,000 teachers and 3,000 support workers in an effort to reduce class sizes.

==== Public safety ====
In an effort to enhance confidence in public safety, Danielle Smith promised to implement an ankle bracelet monitoring program to supervise violent offenders who were released on bail. This program was estimated to cost $2 million annually. Additionally, the United Conservative Party pledged to hire 100 additional police officers in Calgary and Edmonton. They also proposed deploying Alberta Sheriffs to the border to combat drug and gun trafficking and to increase funding for specialized law enforcement teams. Prior to the start of the election, Danielle Smith said that she would not campaign on the previous United Conservative promise to replace the Royal Canadian Mounted Police with the Alberta Provincial Police. She indicated that the issue would be revisited if the United Conservatives were re-elected.

The New Democratic Party pledged to strengthen law enforcement by hiring an additional 150 police officers and 150 support staff, including social workers and addiction counselors. They proposed funding this initiative by reversing the changes implemented by the United Conservative Party in 2019 which increased the provincial share of police fine revenue from 26.7 per cent to 40 per cent. Furthermore, the New Democrats committed to canceling the United Conservative Party's efforts to replace the Royal Canadian Mounted Police with a provincial police force.

=== Debates ===
On May 18, a televised debate took place between Smith and Notley.

=== Endorsements ===
The United Conservative Party received endorsements from former Prime Minister of Canada Stephen Harper, leader of the Conservative Party of Canada Pierre Poilievre, Rona Ambrose, and John Rustad. The Wildrose Independence Party also endorsed the United Conservatives in electoral districts where the Wildrose Independence Party was not fielding a candidate.

The New Democratic Party received endorsements from former Progressive Conservative ministers Thomas Lukaszuk, James L. Foster, and Doug Griffiths. The NDP also received endorsements from former Wildrose and Progressive Conservative MLA Blake Pedersen, and former Liberal Party of Alberta leader David Swann. Other endorsements included former Mayor of Calgary Naheed Nenshi, talk show host Charles Adler, former Conservative Party of Canada Member of Parliament Lee Richardson, and former Conservative Senator Ron Ghitter.

== Opinion polling ==

The following is a list of published opinion polls of voter intentions.

Opinion polls during campaign period
Pollster	Client	Dates conducted	Source	UCP	NDP	Alberta	Liberal	IPA	Green	WIP	SMA	Others	Margin of error	Sample size	Polling method	Lead
General Election	—	May 29, 2023		52.6%	44.0%	0.7%	0.2%	0.3%	0.8%	0.1%	0.3%	—	—	—	—	8.6%
Forum Research	N/A	May 28, 2023		50.4%	44.3%	—	—	—	1.6%	—	—	3.7%	3.1%	1,000	IVR	6.1%
Mainstreet Research	N/A	May 26–28, 2023		49.8%	47.8%	0.5%	—	—	1%	0.3%	—	0.5%	2.5%	1,504	IVR	2%
Abacus Data	N/A	May 26–28, 2023		49%	48%	1%	—	—	—	—	—	2%	2.9%	1,200	Online	1%
Research Co.	N/A	May 26–27, 2023		50%	46%	—	—	—	1%	—	1%	2%	4.0%	600	Online	4%
Ipsos	Global News	May 24–27, 2023		51%	46%	—	—	—	—	—	—	3%	3.1%	1,300	Online/Phone	5%
Mainstreet Research	N/A	May 24–27, 2023		48%	47%	2%	—	—	1%	1%	—	1%	2.2%	1,922	IVR	1%
Counsel Public Affairs	N/A	May 25–26, 2023		41%	46%	5%	5%	—	—	—	—	4%	3%	1,232	Online	5%
Mainstreet Research	N/A	May 23–26, 2023		49%	46%	2%	—	—	1%	1%	—	1%	2.3%	1,841	IVR	3%
Sovereign North Strategies	N/A	May 22–26, 2023		46%	48%	2%	—	—	2%	—	—	2%	1.8%	3,053	IVR/SMS	2%
EKOS	N/A	May 19–26, 2023		50.4%	47.3%	0.8%	0.4%	—	—	—	—	1.1%	2.35%	1,741	Online/IVR	3.1%
Leger	Postmedia	May 23–25, 2023		49%	46%	1%	—	—	1%	—	1%	2%	3.1%	1,011	Online	3%
Oraclepoll Research	N/A	May 22–25, 2023		49%	46%	2%	—	—	3%	—	—	—	3.5%	800	Telephone	3%
Mainstreet Research	N/A	May 22–25, 2023		48%	46%	2%	—	—	2%	1%	—	1%	2.3%	1,734	IVR	2%
Mainstreet Research	N/A	May 21–24, 2023		49%	45%	2%	—	—	2%	1%	—	1%	2.3%	1,700	IVR	4%
Janet Brown Opinion Research	CBC	May 12–24, 2023		52%	44%	1%	1%	1%	1%	<1%	—	<1%	2.8%	1,200	Telephone/Online	8%
Mainstreet Research	N/A	May 20–23, 2023		50%	44%	2%	—	—	1%	1%	—	1%	2.4%	1,662	IVR	6%
Mainstreet Research	N/A	May 19–22, 2023		50%	44%	2%	—	—	2%	1%	—	2%	2.4%	1,655	IVR	6%
Abacus Data	N/A	May 19–22, 2023		51%	47%	1%	—	—	—	—	—	1%	2.6%	1,507	Online	4%
Mainstreet Research	N/A	May 18–21, 2023		49%	44%	3%	—	—	1%	1%	—	1%	2.4%	1,656	IVR	5%
Mainstreet Research	N/A	May 17–20, 2023		47%	46%	3%	—	—	2%	1%	—	2%	2.4%	1,645	IVR	1%
Mainstreet Research	N/A	May 16–19, 2023		48%	45%	3%	—	—	2%	1%	—	1%	2.4%	1,657	IVR	3%
	May 18, 2023	Televised leaders' debate.														
Mainstreet Research	N/A	May 15–18, 2023		47%	47%	3%	—	—	2%	1%	—	1%	2.5%	1,519	IVR	Tie
Research Co.	N/A	May 16–17, 2023		47%	49%	—	—	—	1%	—	1%	2%	4.0%	529	Online	2%
Abacus Data	N/A	May 15–17, 2023		46%	49%	3%	—	—	—	—	—	2%	3.4%	498	Online	3%
Mainstreet Research	N/A	May 14–17, 2023		48%	46%	2%	—	—	2%	1%	—	1%	2.6%	1,404	IVR	2%
Sovereign North Strategies	N/A	May 13–16, 2023		47%	49%	2%	—	—	1%	—	—	1%	1.7%	3,431	IVR/SMS	2%
Mainstreet Research	N/A	May 13–16, 2023		49%	45%	2%	—	—	1%	1%	—	1%	2.7%	1,296	IVR	4%
Angus Reid	N/A	May 12–16, 2023		51%	43%	3%	1%	—	—	—	—	1%	3%	1,202	Online	8%
Mainstreet Research	N/A	May 12–15, 2023		49%	45%	3%	—	—	1%	1%	—	1%	2.8%	1,218	IVR	4%
Counsel Public Affairs	N/A	May 12–14, 2023		38%	48%	5%	4%	—	—	—	—	5%	3%	1,219	Online	10%
Mainstreet Research	N/A	May 11–14, 2023		49%	45%	3%	—	—	1%	1%	—	1%	2.9%	1,140	IVR	4%
Ipsos	Global News	May 10–13, 2023		48%	45%	3%	—	—	—	—	—	4%	3.9%	800	Online	3%
Mainstreet Research	N/A	May 10–13, 2023		49%	44%	2%	—	—	2%	1%	—	1%	2.9%	1,103	IVR	5%
Sovereign North Strategies	Western Standard	May 8–13, 2023		45%	50%	2%	—	—	2%	—	—	2%	1.8%	2,909	IVR/SMS	5%
Mainstreet Research	N/A	May 9–12, 2023		50%	44%	2%	—	—	1%	1%	—	2%	2.7%	1,280	IVR	6%
Abacus Data	N/A	May 9–12, 2023		41%	51%	5%	—	—	—	—	—	3%	3.4%	885	Online	10%
Janet Brown Opinion Research	N/A	May 1–11, 2023		51%	40%	—	—	—	—	—	—	—	3.3%	900	Telephone	11%
Sovereign North Strategies	N/A	May 1–7, 2023		48%	47%	3%	—	—	1%	—	—	2%	1.9%	2,491	IVR/SMS	1%
Mainstreet Research	N/A	May 1–2, 2023		50%	43%	4%	—	—	1%	—	—	2%	2.5%	1,524	IVR	7%
Leger	Postmedia	April 28–May 1, 2023		43%	45%	4%	3%	—	—	1%	—	3%	3.1%	1,000	Online	2%

Opinion polling before campaign period began
Pollster	Client	Dates conducted	Source	UCP	NDP	Alberta	Liberal	IPA	Green	WIP	Others	Margin of error	Sample size	Polling method	Lead
Ipsos	Global News	April 26–30, 2023		48%	44%	4%	—	—	—	—	4%	3.2%	1,200	Online/Phone	4%
ThinkHQ	N/A	April 25–29, 2023		46%	46%	5%	1%	—	—	—	2%	2.5%	1,529	Online	Tie
Abacus Data	N/A	April 21–25, 2023		46%	46%	5%	—	—	—	—	4%	3.1%	1,000	Online	Tie
Oraclepoll Research	N/A	April 17–20, 2023		44%	46%	3%	—	—	5%	1%	1%	3.5%	800	Telephone	2%
Innovative Research	N/A	Apr 13–19, 2023		41%	40%	4%	7%	—	4%	3%	<1%	N/A	1,324	Online	1%
Leger	N/A	Mar 24–27, 2023		44%	47%	2%	3%	—	—	1%	2%	3.1%	1,001	Online	3%
Mainstreet Research	N/A	Mar 21–22, 2023		45%	45.9%	3.2%	—	—	—	2.2%	3.6%	2.9%	1,108	IVR	0.9%
Innovative Research	N/A	Mar 2–20, 2023		39%	40%	5%	7%	—	6%	4%	0%	N/A	489	Online	1%
ThinkHQ	N/A	Mar 14–16, 2023		45%	46%	6%	2%	—	—	—	1%	2.9%	1,122	Online	1%
Angus Reid	N/A	Mar 6–13, 2023		49%	42%	4%	2%	—	—	2%	1%	3%	827	Online	7%
Abacus Data	N/A	Mar 2–4, 2023		45%	45%	6%	—	—	—	—	4%	3.8%	700	Online	Tie
Leger	Postmedia	Feb 10–12, 2023		43%	47%	2%	4%	—	—	2%	2%	3.1%	1,002	Online	4%
Pivotal Research	N/A	Jan 31–Feb 7, 2023		42%	46%	6%	6%	—	—	1%	—	4.8%	662	Online	4%
Abacus Data	N/A	Feb 1–6, 2023		47%	45%	5%	—	—	—	—	3%	3.1%	1,000	Online	2%
ThinkHQ	N/A	Jan 19–20, 2023		48%	45%	4%	—	—	—	—	1%	2.9%	1,144	Online	3%
Mainstreet Research	N/A	Jan 19–20, 2023		45.6%	41.3%	5.9%	—	—	—	3.6%	3.6%	3.9%	646	Smart IVR	4.3%
Abacus Data	N/A	Dec 6–10, 2022		43%	51%	3%	—	—	—	—	3%	3.1%	1,000	Online	8%
Mainstreet Research	N/A	Dec 2–3, 2022		47%	45%	3.8%	—	—	—	0.8%	3.3%	4%	615	IVR	2%
Angus Reid	N/A	Nov 28–Dec 3, 2022		48%	44%	5%	1%	—	—	1%	1%	4%	591	Online	4%
Leger	Postmedia	Nov 24–28, 2022		44%	47%	2%	4%	—	—	2%	2%	3.1%	1,001	Online	3%
Janet Brown Opinion Research	CBC	Oct 12–30, 2022		38%	47%	3%	2%	1%	<1%	1%	8%	2.8%	1,200	Telephone	9%
Navigator Ltd.	N/A	Oct 7–11, 2022		38%	53%	4%	—	—	—	—	5%	3.5%	1,002	Online	15%
Leger	Postmedia	Oct 7–10, 2022		42%	44%	3%	4%	—	—	4%	4%	3.1%	1,000	Online	2%
	October 6, 2022	Danielle Smith elected leader of the UCP and is appointed premier on October 11.													
Angus Reid	N/A	Sep 19–21, 2022		47%	41%	4%	2%	—	—	5%	1%	3%	598	Online	6%
Leger	Postmedia	Sep 1–5, 2022		44%	41%	4%	2%	—	—	4%	3%	3.1%	1,006	Online	3%
Leger	Postmedia	July 15–17, 2022		41%	45%	5%	2%	—	—	4%	3%	3.1%	1,025	Online	4%
Angus Reid	N/A	June 7–13, 2022		42%	40%	6%	2%	—	—	9%	2%	4%	592	Online	2%
Counsel Public Affairs	N/A	June 8–11, 2022		37%	42%	5%	—	—	—	8%	9%	3.5%	788	Online	5%
Leger	N/A	May 20–23, 2022		42%	40%	3%	3%	—	—	5%	4%	3.1%	1,000	Online	2%
	May 18, 2022	Jason Kenney announced his intention to resign as premier of Alberta and leader of the UCP.													
ThinkHQ	N/A	Mar 29–April 1, 2022		34%	46%	5%	2%	—	—	13%	2%	2.9%	1,135	Online	12%
Mainstreet Research	N/A	Mar 23–24, 2022		37%	40%	6%	2%	—	1%	9%	4%	3%	1,290	IVR	3%
Leger	N/A	Mar 18–20, 2022		35%	44%	3%	4%	—	—	8%	6%	3.1%	1,002	Online	9%
Angus Reid	N/A	Mar 10–15, 2022		38%	40%	6%	2%	—	—	11%	3%	4%	584	Online	2%
Research Co.	N/A	Mar 11–13, 2022		30%	45%	7%	5%	1%	3%	8%	1%	4%	600	Online	15%
Janet Brown Opinion Research	N/A	Feb 25–Mar 10, 2022		40%	36%	—	—	—	—	—	—	3.3%	900	Telephone	4%
Yorkville Strategies	N/A	Mar 3–9, 2022		44%	39%	4%	3%	—	—	8%	2%	4%	600	Telephone	5%
Angus Reid	N/A	Jan 7–12, 2022		31%	42%	8%	1%	—	—	16%	2%	4%	548	Online	11%
Leger	Postmedia	Dec 2–5, 2021		32%	43%	—	—	—	—	10%	—	2.8%	1,249	Online	11%
Nanos	Yellowstone to Yukon	Oct 13–Nov 1, 2021	(Note: "Alberta Survey" (PDF). Nanos. November 1, 2021. Archived (PDF) from the original on December 23, 2021. Note: UCP number combines responses for "UCP under Jason Kenney" and "UCP under a different leader".)	38.8%	47.2%	6.5%	2.1%	—	0.1%	3.3%	1.8%	3.5%	801	Online	8.4%
Mainstreet Research	Western Standard	Oct 12–13, 2021		29%	45%	6%	2%	—	1%	13%	—	3.2%	935	IVR	16%
Commonground	N/A	Sep 21–Oct 6, 2021		26.9%	49.5%	6.7%	5.2%	—	—	5.3%	6.4%	N/A	1,204	Online	22.6%
Innovative Research	N/A	Sep 24–Oct 5, 2021		29%	45%	5%	9%	—	2%	8%	1%	N/A	672	Online	16%
Angus Reid	N/A	Sep 29–Oct 3, 2021		31%	43%	7%	2%	—	1%	15%	2%	2.0%	552	Online	12%
Innovative Research	N/A	Sep 10–12, 2021		31%	44%	5%	8%	—	4%	7%	1%	N/A	209	Online	13%
Leger	Postmedia	July 22–26, 2021		34%	45%	6%	4%	—	—	8%	2%	3%	1,377	Online	11%
Angus Reid	N/A	June 2–7, 2021		30%	41%	7%	1%	—	—	20%	2%	4%	502	Online	11%
Mainstreet Research	Western Standard	May 19–20, 2021		31%	38%	6%	3%	—	3%	17%	—	3%	1,010	IVR	7%
Janet Brown Opinion Research	CBC	Mar 15–April 10, 2021		37%	45%	6%	—	—	—	6%	7%	2.1%	1,200	Online	8%
Leger	Calgary Herald	Mar 5–8, 2021		30%	51%	5%	7%	—	—	—	6%	3.1%	1,001	Online	21%
Commonground	N/A	Mar 1–8, 2021		32%	42%	5%	6%	—	—	4%	9%	N/A	802	Online	9%
Angus Reid	N/A	Feb 26–Mar 3, 2021	(Note: "Detailed Results" (PDF). Angus Reid Institute. Archived from the original on March 13, 2021.)	38%	41%	10%	2%	—	1%	—	11%	4%	603	Online	3%
Mainstreet Research	Western Standard	Jan 6–7, 2021		31%	48%	4%	3%	—	2%	10%	2%	3.1%	1,003	Smart IVR	17%
Research Co.	N/A	Dec 2–4, 2020		40%	43%	9%	2%	—	2%	2%	—	4%	600	Online	3%
Angus Reid	N/A	Nov 24–30, 2020		43%	39%	10%	2%	—	1%	—	5%	—	553	Online	4%
Environics Research	CUPE	Nov 10–23, 2020		40%	47%	8%	—	—	—	—	5%	—	1,205	—	7%
Angus Reid	N/A	Aug 26–Sep 1, 2020		38%	38%	9%	2%	7%	1%	—	5%	4%	512	Online	Tie
Commonground	N/A	Aug 17–30, 2020		37%	30%	—	11%	—	—	—	21%	N/A	824	Online	7%
Innovative Research Group	N/A	Jul 14–20, 2020		42%	32%	9%	12%	—	3%	—	3%	—	300	Online	10%
Innovative Research Group	N/A	Jun 19–23, 2020		44%	38%	5%	6%	—	3%	—	3%	—	267	Online	6%
Innovative Research Group	N/A	May 29–June 1, 2020		42%	28%	11%	14%	—	3%	—	2%	—	276	Online	14%
Janet Brown Opinion Research	CBC	May 25–June 1, 2020		46%	36%	10%	6%	—	—	—	3%	3.3%	900	Online	10%
Angus Reid	N/A	May 19–24, 2020		42%	36%	5%	2%	8%	2%	—	4%	1.4%	580	Online	6%
Northwest Research Group	Western Standard	May 14–19, 2020		40%	34%	8%	7%	—	1%	10%	—	3%	1,094	IVR	6%
Innovative Research Group	N/A	May 1–5, 2020		45%	30%	6%	8%	—	7%	—	2%	—	314	Online	15%
Angus Reid	N/A	Feb 24–28, 2020		40%	36%	8%	2%	9%	1%	—	4%	—	555	Online	4%
Mainstreet Research	338Canada	Feb 22, 2020		47%	38%	6%	4%	—	—	—	5%	4%	751	IVR	9%
Stratcom	N/A	Nov 21, 2019		42%	46%	—	—	—	—	—	12%	2.2%	1,798	IVR	4%
Lethbridge College	N/A	Oct 5-10, 2019		58.1%	23.2%	5.8%	7.8%	—	—	—	5.2%	3.17%	953	Telephone	34.9%
2019 general election		April 16, 2019		54.9%	32.7%	9.1%	1.0%	0.7%	0.4%	—	1.2%	—	—	—	22.2%
Pollster	Client	Dates conducted	Source								Others	Margin of error	Sample size	Polling method	Lead
Pollster	Client	Dates conducted	Source	UCP	NDP	Alberta	Liberal	IPA	Green	WIP	Others	Margin of error	Sample size	Polling method	Lead

=== Regional polls ===
Opinion polls in Calgary
Pollster	Client	Dates conducted	Source	UCP	NDP	Alberta	Liberal	Green	WIP	Others	Margin of error	Sample size	Polling method	Lead
ThinkHQ	N/A	May 19–23, 2023		43%	49%	6%	2%	–	–	1%	3%	973	Online	6%
Mainstreet Research	N/A	April 17–18, 2023		45.6%	44.1%	–	–	–	–	–	2.4%	<1,651	Smart IVR	1.5%
Janet Brown Opinion Research	CBC	Mar 23–April 6, 2023		42%	47%	3%	1%	1%	1%	–	3.1%	1,000	Telephone / Online	5%
2019 general election		April 16, 2019		53.2%	34.0%	9.5%	2.0%	0.6%	—	—	—	—	—	18.6%
Pollster	Client	Dates conducted	Source	UCP	NDP	Alberta	Liberal	Green	WIP	Others	Margin of error	Sample size	Polling method	Lead

== Candidates ==
Candidates who are ran were as follows:

Party leaders are in bold. Candidate names appear as they appeared on the ballot.

† = Not seeking re-election
‡ = Running for re-election in different riding § = Represents that the incumbent lost that party's nomination

=== Northern Alberta ===
Electoral district	Candidates					Incumbent
Electoral district	UCP	NDP	Alberta Party	Alberta Independence	Other	Incumbent
Athabasca-Barrhead-Westlock	Glenn van Dijken	Landen Tischer				Glenn van Dijken
Bonnyville-Cold Lake-St. Paul	Scott Cyr	Caitlyn Blake				Dave Hanson§
Central Peace-Notley	Todd Loewen	Megan Ciurysek	Wanda Lynn Lekisch	Rodney Bowen	Nancy O'Neill (SMA)	Todd Loewen
Fort McMurray-Lac La Biche	Brian Jean	Calan William Simeon Hobbs			Kdmkevin Johnston (Ind.)	Brian Jean
Fort McMurray-Wood Buffalo	Tany Yao	Tanika Chaisson	Bradley Friesen		Funky Banjoko (Ind.); Zulkifl Mujahid (Ind.)	Tany Yao
Grande Prairie	Nolan Dyck	Kevin McLean	Preston Mildenberger	David Braun	Shane Diederich (Green)	Tracy Allard†
Grande Prairie-Wapiti	Ron Wiebe	Dustin Archibald		Brooklyn Biegel		Travis Toews†
Lesser Slave Lake	Scott Sinclair	Danielle Larivee			Bert "Bertrand" Seatter (SMA)	Pat Rehn†
Peace River	Dan Williams	Liana Paiva		Sharon Noullett	Conrad Nunweiler (Ind.)	Dan Williams

=== Edmonton ===
==== Central ====
Electoral district	Candidates				Incumbent
Electoral district	UCP	NDP	Green	Other	Incumbent
Edmonton-City Centre	Richard Wong	David Shepherd	David Clark		David Shepherd
Edmonton-Glenora	Melissa Crane	Sarah Hoffman	Julian Schulz	David John Bohonos (SMA)	Sarah Hoffman
Edmonton-Gold Bar	Miles Berry	Marlin Schmidt	Ernestina Malheiro	Graham Lettner (Ind.)	Marlin Schmidt
Edmonton-Highlands-Norwood	Nicholas Kalynchuk	Janis Irwin	Kristine Kowalchuk	**Naomi Rankin** (Comm.)	Janis Irwin
Edmonton-Riverview	Terry Vankka	Lori Sigurdson	Robin George	Eric Champagne (Lib.)	Lori Sigurdson
Edmonton-Strathcona	Emad El-Zein	**Rachel Notley**	Robert Gooding-Townsend	Andrew Jacobson (Buffalo); Robert Nielsen (WLC)	Rachel Notley

==== North ====
Electoral district	Candidates				Incumbent
Electoral district	UCP	NDP	Green	Other	Incumbent
Edmonton-Beverly-Clareview	Luke Suvanto	Peggy Wright	Michael Hunter	Andrzej "Andy" Gudanowski (Ind.)	Deron Bilous†
Edmonton-Castle Downs	Jon Dziadyk	Nicole Goehring		Patrick Stewart (AP)	Nicole Goehring
Edmonton-Decore	Sayid Ahmed	Sharif Haji		Brent Tyson (AP); Don Slater (Lib.)	Chris Nielsen§
Edmonton-Manning	Albert Mazzocca	Heather Sweet	Derek Thompson		Heather Sweet
Edmonton-McClung	Daniel Heikkinen	Lorne Dach	Terry Syvenky	Andrew J. Lineker (Ind.)	Lorne Dach
Edmonton-North West	Ali Haymour	David Eggen	Tyler Beaulac		David Eggen
Edmonton-West Henday	Slava Cravcenco	Brooks Arcand-Paul	Kristina Howard	Dan Bildhauer (Lib.)	Jon Carson†

==== South ====
Electoral district	Candidates				Incumbent
Electoral district	UCP	NDP	Green	Other	Incumbent
Edmonton-Ellerslie	R. Singh Bath	Rod Loyola		Angela Stretch (WLC)	Rod Loyola
Edmonton-Meadows	Amrit Singh Matharu	Jasvir Deol		Corrine Benson (Comm.)	Jasvir Deol
Edmonton-Mill Woods	Raman Athwal	Christina Gray			Christina Gray
Edmonton-Rutherford	Laine Larson	Jodi Calahoo Stonehouse	**Jordan Wilkie**		Richard Feehan†
Edmonton-South	Joseph Angeles	Rhiannon Hoyle	Chryssy Beckmann		Thomas Dang†
Edmonton-South West	Kaycee Madu	Nathan Ip	Jeff Cullihall		Kaycee Madu
Edmonton-Whitemud	Raj Sherman	Rakhi Pancholi	Cheri Hawley	Donna Wilson (Lib.)	Rakhi Pancholi

==== Suburbs ====
Electoral district	Candidates					Incumbent
Electoral district	UCP	NDP	Green	SMA	Other	Incumbent
Fort Saskatchewan-Vegreville	Jackie Armstrong-Homeniuk	Taneen Rudyk		Margaret MacKay	Kelly Zeleny (APA); Kathy Flett (Ind.)	Jackie Armstrong-Homeniuk
Leduc-Beaumont	Brandon Lunty	Cam Heenan		Bill Kaufmann	Sharon MacLise (IPA); Kirk Cayer (Ind.)	Brad Rutherford†
Morinville-St. Albert	Dale Nally	Karen Shaw	Kurt Klingbeil		Wayne Rufiange (AP)	Dale Nally
St. Albert	Angela Wood	Marie Renaud	Cameron Jefferies			Marie Renaud
Sherwood Park	Jordan Walker	Kyle Kasawski			Sue Timanson (AP); Jacob Stacey (Lib.)	Jordan Walker
Spruce Grove-Stony Plain	Searle Turton	Chantal Saramaga-McKenzie	Daniel Birrell	Darlene Clarke		Searle Turton
Strathcona-Sherwood Park	Nate Glubish	Bill Tonita			Jody Balanko (Ind.)	Nate Glubish

=== Central Alberta ===
==== West ====
Electoral district	Candidates						Incumbent
Electoral district	UCP	NDP	Green	WLC	SMA	Other	Incumbent
Drayton Valley-Devon	Andrew Boitchenko	Harry Singh		Jon Hokanson	Gail Tookey	Dale Withers (APA)	Mark Smith†
Innisfail-Sylvan Lake	Devin Dreeshen	Jason Heistad			Brandon Pringle	David Reid (IPA); **Jeevan Mangat** (WIP); **Randy Thorsteinson** (Reform)	Devin Dreeshen
Lac Ste. Anne-Parkland	Shane Getson	Oneil Carlier	Vanessa Diehl			**Marilyn Burns** (APA); Janet Jabush (AP)	Shane Getson
Red Deer-North	Adriana LaGrange	Jaelene Tweedle	Heather Morigeau		Kallie Dyck	Vicky Bayford (IPA)	Adriana LaGrange
Red Deer-South	Jason Stephan	Michelle Baer	Ashley MacDonald	Jesse Stretch	Pamela Liebenberg		Jason Stephan
Rimbey-Rocky Mountain House-Sundre	Jason Nixon	Vance Buchwald		Tami Tatlock		Carol Nordlund Kinsey (APA); Fred Schwieger (Ind.); Tim Hoven (Ind.)	Jason Nixon
West Yellowhead	Martin Long	Fred Kreiner					Martin Long

==== East ====
Electoral district	Candidates						Incumbent
Electoral district	UCP	NDP	Green	WLC	SMA	Other	Incumbent
Camrose	Jackie Lovely	Richard Bruneau		Pamela Henson		Bob Blayone (Ind.)	Jackie Lovely
Drumheller-Stettler	Nate Horner	Juliet Franklin		Hannah Stretch Viens	Carla Evers	Shannon Packham (IPA)	Nate Horner
Lacombe-Ponoka	Jennifer Johnson	Dave Dale	Taylor Lowery	Daniel Jeffries	Nathan Leslie	Myles Chykerda (AP)	Ron Orr†
Maskwacis-Wetaskiwin	Rick Wilson	Katherine Swampy	Justin Fuss		Suzanne Jubb	Marie Rittenhouse (Ind.)	Rick Wilson
Vermilion-Lloydminster-Wainwright	Garth Rowswell	Dawn Flaata	Tigra-Lee Campbell	Danny Hozack		Darrell Dunn (AP); Matthew Powell (Ind.)	Garth Rowswell

=== Calgary ===
==== Central ====
Electoral district	Candidates					Incumbent
Electoral district	UCP	NDP	Green	SMA	Other	Incumbent
Calgary-Buffalo	Astrid Kuhn	Joe Ceci	Jonathan Parks	Lola Henry		Joe Ceci
Calgary-Currie	Nicholas Milliken	Janet Eremenko	Lane Robson	Dawid Pawlowski	Leila Keith (Lib.); Jason Avramenko (AP)	Nicholas Milliken
Calgary-Elbow	Chris Davis	Samir Kayande		**Artur Pawlowski**	Kerry Cundal (AP)	Vacant
Calgary-Klein	Jeremy Nixon	Lizette Tejada	Kenneth Drysdale	Rob Oswin		Jeremy Nixon
Calgary-Mountain View	Pamela Rath	Kathleen Ganley		Christopher Wedick	Lucas Hernandez (Pro-Life); Frances Woytkiw (Lib.)	Kathleen Ganley
Calgary-Varsity	Jason Copping	Luanne Metz		Kent Liang	Oaklan Davidsen (WLC)	Jason Copping

==== East ====
Electoral district	Candidates					Incumbent
Electoral district	UCP	NDP	Green	SMA	Other	Incumbent
Calgary-Cross	Mickey Amery	Gurinder Singh Gill	Aman Sandhu	Kathryn Lapp		Mickey Amery
Calgary-East	Peter Singh	Rosman Valencia	Jayden Baldonado	Garry Dirk	Jonathan Trautman (Comm.)	Peter Singh
Calgary-Falconridge	Devinder Toor	Parmeet Singh Boparai	Ahmed Hassan	Evan Wilson	Kyle Kennedy (Ind.)	Devinder Toor
Calgary-Bhullar-McCall	Amanpreet Singh Gill	Irfan Sabir				Irfan Sabir
Calgary-North East	Inder Grewal	Gurinder Brar				Rajan Sawhney‡
Calgary-Peigan	Tanya Fir	Denis Ram	Shaun Pulsifer			Tanya Fir

==== Northwest ====
Electoral district	Candidates					Incumbent
Electoral district	UCP	NDP	Alberta Party	SMA	Other	Incumbent
Calgary-Beddington	Josephine Pon	Amanda Chapman	Wayne Jackson		Zarnab Shahid Zafar (Lib.)	Josephine Pon
Calgary-Bow	Demetrios Nicolaides	Druh Farrell	Paul Godard	Manuel Santos		Demetrios Nicolaides
Calgary-Edgemont	Prasad Panda	Julia Hayter	Allen Schultz	Miles Williams	Nan Barron (WLC)	Prasad Panda
Calgary-Foothills	Jason Luan	Court Ellingson		Kami Dass	Keenan DeMontigny (Ind.)	Jason Luan
Calgary-North	Muhammad Yaseen	Rajesh Angral				Muhammad Yaseen
Calgary-North West	Rajan Sawhney	Michael Lisboa-Smith	Jenny Yeremiy	Alain Habel	Serena Thomsen (Ind.)	Sonya Savage†
Calgary-West	Mike Ellis	Joan Chand'oiseau			Jason McKee (Green)	Mike Ellis

==== South ====
Electoral district	Candidates					Incumbent
Electoral district	UCP	NDP	Green	SMA	Other	Incumbent
Calgary-Acadia	Tyler Shandro	Diana Batten	Paul Bechthold	Linda McClelland	Larry R. Heather (Ind.); Donna Kathleen Scott (WLC)	Tyler Shandro
Calgary-Fish Creek	Myles McDougall	Rebecca Bounsall		Dave Hughes	Charlie Heater (Lib.)	Richard Gotfried†
Calgary-Glenmore	Whitney Issik	Nagwan Al-Guneid	Steven Maffioli			Whitney Issik
Calgary-Hays	Richard William "Ric" McIver	Andrew Stewart	Evelyn Tanaka	Garry Leonhardt		Ric McIver
Calgary-Lougheed	Eric Bouchard	Venkat Ravulaparthi		Nathaniel Pawlowski	**John Roggeveen** (Lib.)	Vacant
Calgary-Shaw	Rebecca Schulz	David Cloutier		Pietro Cervo		Rebecca Schulz
Calgary-South East	Matt Jones	Justin Huseby	Catriona Wright	Heinrich Friesen		Matt Jones

==== Suburbs ====
Electoral district	Candidates					Incumbent
Electoral district	UCP	NDP	Green	SMA	Other	Incumbent
Airdrie-Cochrane	Peter Guthrie	Shaun Fluker	Michelle Overwater Giles	Michael Andrusco	Ron Voss (WLC)	Peter Guthrie
Airdrie-East	Angela Pitt	Dan Nelles	Michael Jacobsen			Angela Pitt
Banff-Kananaskis	Miranda Rosin	Sarah Elmeligi	Regan Boychuk	Kyle Jubb		Miranda Rosin
Chestermere-Strathmore	Chantelle de Jonge	Raj Jessel		Jed Laboucane	Kerry Lambert (IPA); Terry Nicholls (Ind.)	Leela Aheer†
Highwood	R.J. Sigurdson	Jessica Hallam			Mike Lorusso (WIP)	R. J. Sigurdson
Olds-Didsbury-Three Hills	Nathan Cooper	Cheryl Hunter Loewen		Judy Bridges	Katherine Kowalchuk (IPA); Cam Tatlock (WLC)	Nathan Cooper

=== Southern Alberta ===
Electoral district	Candidates						Incumbent
Electoral district	UCP	NDP	Alberta Party	Alberta Independence	Liberal	Other	Incumbent
Brooks-Medicine Hat	**Danielle Smith**	Gwendoline Dirk	**Barry Morishita**				Danielle Smith
Cardston-Siksika	Joseph Schow	Colleen Quintal		Terry Wolsey		Par Wantenaar (SMA); Angela Tabak (Ind.)	Joseph Schow
Cypress-Medicine Hat	Justin Wright	Cathy Hogg		Cody Ray Both		Matt Orr (WLC)	Drew Barnes†
Lethbridge-East	Nathan Neudorf	Rob Miyashiro			Helen McMenamin		Nathan Neudorf
Lethbridge-West	Cheryl Seaborn	Shannon Phillips	Braham Luddu		Pat Chizek		Shannon Phillips
Livingstone-Macleod	Chelsae Petrovic	Kevin Van Tighem	Kevin Todd	Corrie Reed Toone	Dylin Hauser	Erik Abildgaard (Ind.)	Roger Reid†
Taber-Warner	Grant Hunter	Jazminn Hintz		Frank Kast		**Paul Hinman** (WLC); Joel Hunt (Green); Brent Ginther (SMA)	Grant Hunter

== Results ==
The United Conservative Party was re-elected to majority government, receiving both majority of votes cast and majority of the seats in the Legislative Assembly. The Alberta NDP received the highest share of the vote in its history and elected its second-best-ever number of MLAs. The race was noteworthy both as one of the fiercest two-way battles in the last hundred years in Canadian history and by its results — electing only two parties in the Legislature, unusually producing a second back-to-back two-party legislature.

The UCP swept nearly all ridings outside of Calgary and Edmonton: the NDP won only four seats outside of either city, with two being suburban seats in Metro Edmonton (St. Albert and Sherwood Park), one seat in Lethbridge (Lethbridge-West) and a single rural seat surrounding Banff National Park (Banff-Kananaskis). Conversely, the NDP made a clean one-party sweep of Edmonton's 20 seats. The parties ran nearly evenly in Calgary: the NDP won 14 seats to the UCP's 12, with several seats decided by very narrow margins.

The Liberal Party got its lowest vote record in its history with just 0.24%.

The elections set several firsts — the election of the first Black woman and the first First Nations woman. These were Rhiannon Hoyle in Edmonton-South and Jodi Calahoo Stonehouse in Edmonton-Rutherford, respectively. As well, the first black Muslim and first Somali-Canadian was elected in Alberta in Edmonton-Decore – Sharif Haji.

=== Legislature summary ===

Party	Votes			Seats	
United Conservative	928,900	52.6%	▼2.2pp	49 / 87 (56%)	▼14
New Democratic	777,404	44.0%	▲11.4pp	38 / 87 (44%)	▲14
Others and independents	58,613	3.3%		0 / 87 (0%)	

Alberta Legislature
Party	Leader	Candidates	Seats				Popular vote		
Party	Leader	Candidates	2019	Dissol.	2023	+/-	Votes	%	+/-
United Conservative	Danielle Smith	87	63	60	49	-14	928,900	52.63%	−2.23
New Democratic	Rachel Notley	87	24	23	38	+14	777,404	44.05%	+11.36
Green	Jordan Wilkie	41	–	–	–	–	13,457	0.76%	+0.36
Alberta Party	Barry Morishita	19	–	–	–	–	12,576	0.71%	−8.37
Independent		22	–	2	–	–	12,162	0.69%	+0.28
Alberta Independence	Vacant	14	–	–	–	–	5,045	0.29%	−0.43
Solidarity Movement	Artur Pawlowski	38	New	–	–	–	4,664	0.26%	New
Liberal	John Roggeveen	13	–	–	–	–	4,259	0.24%	−0.74
Wildrose Loyalty Coalition	Paul Hinman	16	New	–	–	–	4,220	0.24%	New
Wildrose Independence	Jeevan Mangat (i)	2	New	–	–	–	820	0.05%	New
Advantage Party	Marilyn Burns	4	–	–	–	–	701	0.04%	−0.26
Communist	Naomi Rankin	3	–	–	–	–	379	0.02%	+0.01
Reform	Randy Thorsteinson	1	–	–	–	–	132	0.01%	+0.00
Buffalo	John Molberg	1	New	–	–	–	106	0.01%	New
Pro-Life	Murray Ruhl	1	–	–	–	–	90	0.01%	+0.00
Vacant				2					
Valid votes							1,764,915	99.30	–
Blank and invalid votes							12,415	0.70	–
Total		349	87	87	87	87	1,777,321	100.00%	–
Registered voters/turnout							2,987,208	59.50%	–

=== Synopsis of results ===
2023 Alberta general election - synopsis of riding results
Riding (Note: initially sorted by electoral district number)	2019	Winning party					Turnout (Note: including spoilt ballots)	Votes (Note: minor political parties (those other than the top six) are aggregated under "Other"; independent candidates are aggregated separately)								
Riding	2019	Party	Votes	Share	Margin #	Margin %	Turnout	UCP	NDP	Green	AP	WLC	Sol Mvt	Ind	Other	Total
Calgary-Acadia	UCP	NDP	10,959	48.6%	22	0.1%	64.3%	10,937	10,959	293	–	119	92	162	–	22,562
Calgary-Beddington	UCP	NDP	10,269	49.7%	543	2.6%	58.3%	9,726	10,269	–	473	–	–	–	210	20,678
Calgary-Bow	UCP	UCP	13,175	49.7%	623	2.4%	66.4%	13,175	12,552	–	670	–	89	–	–	26,486
Calgary-Buffalo	NDP	NDP	13,221	63.0%	5,929	28.3%	56.2%	7,292	13,221	349	–	–	125	–	–	20,987
Calgary-Cross	UCP	UCP	7,533	50.2%	514	3.4%	49.8%	7,533	7,019	254	–	–	202	–	–	15,008
Calgary-Currie	UCP	NDP	12,261	54.8%	3,080	13.8%	62.4%	9,181	12,261	222	409	–	83	–	216	22,372
Calgary-East	UCP	UCP	7,123	50.2%	698	4.9%	44.4%	7,123	6,425	403	–	–	166	–	64	14,181
Calgary-Edgemont	UCP	NDP	11,681	49.3%	284	1.2%	65.7%	11,397	11,681	–	488	66	64	–	–	23,696
Calgary-Elbow	UCP	NDP	12,189	49.0%	743	3.0%	68.8%	11,446	12,189	–	1,136	–	99	–	–	24,870
Calgary-Falconridge	UCP	NDP	7,786	56.4%	2,310	16.7%	48.5%	5,476	7,786	203	–	–	91	252	–	13,808
Calgary-Fish Creek	UCP	UCP	13,743	53.8%	2,489	9.7%	69.5%	13,743	11,254	–	–	–	186	–	378	25,561
Calgary-Foothills	UCP	NDP	11,054	49.9%	261	1.2%	61.9%	10,793	11,054	–	–	–	105	190	–	22,142
Calgary-Glenmore	UCP	NDP	12,687	49.3%	48	0.2%	70.2%	12,639	12,687	422	–	–	–	–	–	25,748
Calgary-Hays	UCP	UCP	11,807	55.6%	2,820	13.3%	60.4%	11,807	8,987	321	–	–	118	–	–	21,233
Calgary-Klein	UCP	NDP	10,564	50.9%	867	4.2%	59.2%	9,697	10,564	353	–	–	153	–	–	20,767
Calgary-Lougheed	UCP	UCP	9,690	56.4%	2,766	16.1%	60.1%	9,690	6,924	–	–	–	184	–	369	17,167
Calgary-Bhullar-McCall	NDP	NDP	7,265	58.0%	2,004	16.0%	52.9%	5,261	7,265	–	–	–	–	–	–	12,526
Calgary-Mountain View	NDP	NDP	16,516	64.7%	8,048	31.5%	65.4%	8,468	16,516	–	–	–	119	–	425	25,528
Calgary-North	UCP	UCP	7,927	50.4%	129	0.8%	56.8%	7,927	7,798	–	–	–	–	–	–	15,725
Calgary-North East	UCP	NDP	11,117	55.0%	2,039	10.1%	57.4%	9,078	11,117	–	–	–	–	–	–	20,195
Calgary-North West	UCP	UCP	11,921	48.3%	143	0.6%	70.1%	11,921	11,778	–	778	–	45	153	–	24,675
Calgary-Peigan	UCP	UCP	11,892	55.0%	2,797	12.9%	62.3%	11,892	9,095	626	–	–	–	–	–	21,613
Calgary-Shaw	UCP	UCP	13,970	56.3%	3,379	13.6%	63.2%	13,970	10,591	–	–	–	236	–	–	24,797
Calgary-South East	UCP	UCP	14,087	58.8%	4,645	19.4%	62.8%	14,087	9,442	318	–	–	104	–	–	23,951
Calgary-Varsity	UCP	NDP	13,449	58.3%	4,072	17.6%	70.7%	9,377	13,449	–	–	141	112	–	–	23,079
Calgary-West	UCP	UCP	12,793	56.7%	3,325	14.7%	66.3%	12,793	9,468	313	–	–	–	–	–	22,574
Edmonton-Beverly-Clareview	NDP	NDP	8,510	57.7%	2,820	19.1%	49.0%	5,690	8,510	337	–	–	–	222	–	14,759
Edmonton-Castle Downs	NDP	NDP	10,044	55.7%	2,758	15.3%	53.6%	7,286	10,044	–	707	–	–	–	–	18,037
Edmonton-City Centre	NDP	NDP	12,431	74.9%	8,740	52.7%	51.0%	3,691	12,431	476	–	–	–	–	–	16,598
Edmonton-Decore	NDP	NDP	8,109	52.8%	1,783	11.6%	47.0%	6,326	8,109	–	631	–	–	–	295	15,361
Edmonton-Ellerslie	NDP	NDP	11,429	61.7%	4,612	24.9%	54.8%	6,817	11,429	–	–	264	–	–	–	18,510
Edmonton-Glenora	NDP	NDP	12,443	69.2%	7,387	41.1%	56.3%	5,056	12,443	332	–	–	150	–	–	17,981
Edmonton-Gold Bar	NDP	NDP	15,508	69.5%	9,334	41.8%	63.3%	6,174	15,508	316	–	–	–	321	–	22,319
Edmonton-Highlands-Norwood	NDP	NDP	9,491	71.5%	6,141	46.2%	45.2%	3,350	9,491	339	–	–	–	–	102	13,282
Edmonton-Manning	NDP	NDP	10,547	59.8%	3,778	21.4%	50.9%	6,769	10,547	333	–	–	–	–	–	17,649
Edmonton-McClung	NDP	NDP	9,603	59.5%	3,574	22.1%	56.1%	6,029	9,603	199	–	–	–	309	–	16,140
Edmonton-Meadows	NDP	NDP	11,013	62.6%	4,635	26.3%	55.2%	6,378	11,013	–	–	–	–	–	213	17,604
Edmonton-Mill Woods	NDP	NDP	11,063	61.7%	4,194	23.4%	56.5%	6,869	11,063	–	–	–	–	–	–	17,932
Edmonton-North West	NDP	NDP	9,978	59.7%	3,590	21.5%	52.0%	6,388	9,978	335	–	–	–	–	–	16,701
Edmonton-Riverview	NDP	NDP	12,875	67.1%	7,311	38.1%	63.3%	5,564	12,875	347	–	–	–	–	413	19,199
Edmonton-Rutherford	NDP	NDP	13,012	65.1%	6,646	33.2%	63.5%	6,366	13,012	624	–	–	–	–	–	20,002
Edmonton-South	NDP	NDP	14,171	59.0%	4,679	19.5%	60.1%	9,492	14,171	369	–	–	–	–	–	24,032
Edmonton-South West	UCP	NDP	14,380	56.5%	3,639	14.3%	62.7%	10,741	14,380	323	–	–	–	–	–	25,444
Edmonton-Strathcona	NDP	NDP	13,980	79.7%	10,948	62.4%	58.4%	3,032	13,980	324	–	93	–	–	106	17,535
Edmonton-West Henday	NDP	NDP	11,495	56.8%	3,539	17.5%	57.7%	7,956	11,495	382	–	–	–	–	391	20,224
Edmonton-Whitemud	NDP	NDP	12,797	60.4%	4,998	23.6%	64.7%	7,799	12,797	221	–	–	–	–	370	21,187
Airdrie-Cochrane	UCP	UCP	18,074	60.1%	6,851	22.8%	66.4%	18,074	11,223	393	–	183	199	–	–	30,072
Airdrie-East	UCP	UCP	15,215	62.0%	6,518	26.6%	61.8%	15,215	8,697	623	–	–	–	–	–	24,535
Athabasca-Barrhead-Westlock	UCP	UCP	15,631	74.3%	10,230	48.6%	60.1%	15,631	5,401	–	–	–	–	–	–	21,032
Banff-Kananaskis	UCP	NDP	11,562	49.7%	303	1.3%	67.5%	11,259	11,562	336	–	–	105	–	–	23,262
Bonnyville-Cold Lake-St. Paul	UCP	UCP	13,315	75.5%	8,988	50.9%	51.5%	13,315	4,327	–	–	–	–	–	–	17,642
Brooks-Medicine Hat	UCP	UCP	13,315	66.5%	7,838	39.1%	56.9%	13,315	5,477	–	1,233	–	–	–	–	20,025
Camrose	UCP	UCP	13,032	63.4%	7,453	36.3%	61.6%	13,032	5,579	–	–	205	–	1,740	–	20,556
Cardston-Siksika	UCP	UCP	10,550	74.1%	8,023	56.4%	55.1%	10,550	2,527	–	–	–	35	871	251	14,234
Central Peace-Notley	UCP	UCP	9,280	77.7%	7,064	59.1%	58.5%	9,280	2,216	–	166	–	46	–	238	11,946
Chestermere-Strathmore	UCP	UCP	15,362	69.7%	9,243	41.9%	58.2%	15,362	6,119	–	–	–	45	258	264	22,048
Cypress-Medicine Hat	UCP	UCP	13,489	61.9%	5,792	26.6%	53.2%	13,489	7,697	–	–	322	–	–	287	21,795
Drayton Valley-Devon	UCP	UCP	16,532	73.7%	11,523	51.4%	61.9%	16,532	5,009	–	–	580	121	–	189	22,431
Drumheller-Stettler	UCP	UCP	15,270	82.1%	12,586	67.7%	60.6%	15,270	2,684	–	–	150	104	–	382	18,590
Fort McMurray-Lac La Biche	UCP	UCP	7,692	73.6%	5,131	49.1%	42.9%	7,692	2,561	–	–	–	–	202	–	10,455
Fort McMurray-Wood Buffalo	UCP	UCP	6,483	67.7%	4,599	48.0%	41.6%	6,483	1,884	–	255	–	–	956	–	9,578
Fort Saskatchewan-Vegreville	UCP	UCP	14,126	58.1%	5,062	20.8%	60.1%	14,126	9,064	–	–	–	108	801	227	24,326
Grande Prairie	UCP	UCP	10,001	63.9%	5,111	32.7%	48.7%	10,001	4,890	160	242	–	–	–	348	15,641
Grande Prairie-Wapiti	UCP	UCP	15,093	76.2%	11,030	55.7%	54.5%	15,093	4,063	–	–	–	–	–	645	19,801
Highwood	UCP	UCP	17,990	68.9%	10,450	40.0%	67.3%	17,990	7,540	–	–	–	–	–	580	26,110
Innisfail-Sylvan Lake	UCP	UCP	16,385	71.6%	10,685	46.7%	61.4%	16,385	5,700	–	–	–	149	–	648	22,882
Lac Ste. Anne-Parkland	UCP	UCP	14,923	69.0%	9,055	41.8%	61.3%	14,923	5,868	205	463	–	–	–	182	21,641
Lacombe-Ponoka	UCP	UCP	14,324	67.6%	9,329	44.0%	61.3%	14,324	4,995	196	1,167	444	74	–	–	21,200
Leduc-Beaumont	UCP	UCP	14,118	56.7%	4,049	16.3%	62.5%	14,118	10,069	–	–	–	144	292	257	24,880
Lesser Slave Lake	UCP	UCP	5,171	65.0%	2,535	31.9%	49.0%	5,171	2,636	–	–	–	144	–	–	7,951
Lethbridge-East	UCP	UCP	10,998	50.3%	636	2.9%	57.7%	10,998	10,362	–	–	–	–	–	488	21,848
Lethbridge-West	NDP	NDP	12,082	53.9%	2,557	11.4%	60.5%	9,525	12,082	–	425	–	–	–	375	22,407
Livingstone-Macleod	UCP	UCP	16,491	66.9%	9,999	40.6%	64.5%	16,491	6,492	–	975	–	–	130	547	24,635
Maskwacis-Wetaskiwin	UCP	UCP	11,640	67.5%	6,839	39.7%	58.0%	11,640	4,801	187	–	–	86	520	–	17,234
Morinville-St. Albert	UCP	UCP	13,472	51.8%	1,744	6.7%	66.0%	13,472	11,728	230	590	–	–	–	–	26,020
Olds-Didsbury-Three Hills	UCP	UCP	18,228	75.3%	13,675	56.5%	62.1%	18,228	4,553	–	–	183	105	–	1,140	24,209
Peace River	UCP	UCP	8,236	72.8%	5,649	50.0%	45.5%	8,236	2,587	–	–	–	–	290	194	11,307
Red Deer-North	UCP	UCP	10,629	57.5%	3,485	18.8%	55.5%	10,629	7,144	257	–	–	183	–	281	18,494
Red Deer-South	UCP	UCP	13,469	56.1%	3,493	14.5%	61.8%	13,469	9,976	274	–	160	146	–	–	24,025
Rimbey-Rocky Mountain House-Sundre	UCP	UCP	15,571	69.5%	12,178	54.3%	64.9%	15,571	3,118	–	–	96	–	3,528	103	22,416
Sherwood Park	UCP	NDP	13,108	50.3%	1,661	6.4%	70.3%	11,447	13,108	–	1,293	–	–	–	225	26,073
Spruce Grove-Stony Plain	UCP	UCP	14,365	57.0%	4,168	16.5%	61.5%	14,365	10,197	422	–	–	223	–	–	25,207
St. Albert	NDP	NDP	15,021	58.5%	4,821	18.8%	66.4%	10,200	15,021	455	–	–	–	–	–	25,676
Strathcona-Sherwood Park	UCP	UCP	13,865	53.1%	2,219	8.5%	70.0%	13,865	11,646	–	–	–	–	614	–	26,125
Taber-Warner	UCP	UCP	12,379	75.3%	9,562	58.2%	56.3%	12,379	2,817	239	–	754	124	–	129	16,442
Vermilion-Lloydminster-Wainwright	UCP	UCP	13,097	74.4%	10,022	56.9%	52.4%	13,097	3,075	146	475	460	–	351	–	17,604
West Yellowhead	UCP	UCP	14,456	71.8%	8,777	43.6%	55.4%	14,456	5,679	–	–	–	–	–	–	20,135

= results as certified in a judicial recount
= open seat
= turnout is above provincial average
= incumbent re-elected
= incumbent failed to get renominated
= candidate disqualified from seeking UCP nomination

=== Comparative analysis for ridings (2023 vs 2019) ===
Ternary plots of election results
2019

2023
Electoral districts won identified by UCP (blue) and NDP (orange).
2023 vs 2019

2023 (by winning party)
2023 vs 2019

2023 (by party finishing second)
2023 vs 2019

2023, In increments of two percentage points, because of slimness of shares.
2023 vs 2019

2023 (by winning party)

Summary of riding results by turnout, vote share for winning candidate, and swing (vs 2019) (Note: Summarized from "Provincial Results". Elections Alberta. Archived from the original on February 21, 2025.)
Riding and winning party			Turnout		Vote share (Note: Share won by winning candidate, with difference noted from share achieved by the same party in 2018.)		Swing (Note: Positive indicates improvement to standing of party winning in 2018; negative points to 2018's second-place party being swung to.)
Riding and winning party			%	Change (pp)	%	Change (pp)	Change (pp)
Calgary-Acadia	NDP	Gain	65.3	-2.2	48.6	13.9	-9.9
Calgary-Beddington	NDP	Gain	60.3	-2.7	49.7	13.9	-10.0
Calgary-Bow	UCP	Hold	66.8	-1.1	49.7	-6.2	-9.7
Calgary-Buffalo	NDP	Hold	58.6	-2.0	63.0	14.1	9.3
Calgary-Cross	UCP	Hold	50.5	-3.0	50.2	-4.1	-6.7
Calgary-Currie	NDP	Gain	63.8	-2.2	54.8	11.9	-7.3
Calgary-East	UCP	Hold	45.2	-2.5	50.2	0.5	-6.3
Calgary-Edgemont	NDP	Gain	66.1	-3.8	49.3	15.3	-10.0
Calgary-Elbow	NDP	Gain	69.0	-2.7	49.0	25.5	13.8
Calgary-Falconridge	NDP	Gain	48.9	-2.8	56.4	11.4	-8.7
Calgary-Fish Creek	UCP	Hold	70.2	-1.8	53.8	-7.8	-11.5
Calgary-Foothills	NDP	Gain	61.7	-4.4	49.9	17.5	-12.9
Calgary-Glenmore	NDP	Gain	70.2	-1.4	49.3	17.3	-11.9
Calgary-Hays	UCP	Hold	61.0	-5.0	55.6	-7.6	-12.2
Calgary-Klein	NDP	Gain	60.5	-3.9	50.9	11.0	-5.9
Calgary-Lougheed	UCP	Hold	60.8	-5.1	56.4	-9.3	-12.6
Calgary-Bhullar-McCall	NDP	Hold	53.8	-2.1	58.0	6.3	1.2
Calgary-Mountain View	NDP	Hold	67.2	-2.4	64.7	17.4	10.4
Calgary-North	UCP	Hold	56.8	-4.9	50.4	-4.8	-11.7
Calgary-North East	NDP	Gain	58.1	-4.2	55.0	19.4	-11.9
Calgary-North West	UCP	Hold	69.7	-2.1	48.3	-8.4	-12.1
Calgary-Peigan	UCP	Hold	63.1	-3.2	55.0	-4.8	-8.8
Calgary-Shaw	UCP	Hold	63.3	-4.9	56.3	-9.0	-13.0
Calgary-South East	UCP	Hold	62.9	-8.3	58.8	-2.4	-11.4
Calgary-Varsity	NDP	Gain	71.3	-1.9	58.3	14.8	-10.2
Calgary-West	UCP	Hold	66.7	-3.1	56.7	-9.5	-13.0
Edmonton-Beverly-Clareview	NDP	Hold	49.2	-6.9	57.7	7.0	2.3
Edmonton-Castle Downs	NDP	Hold	53.9	-11.2	55.7	10.0	2.8
Edmonton-City Centre	NDP	Hold	52.9	-6.5	74.9	8.9	4.2
Edmonton-Decore	NDP	Hold	47.9	-8.5	52.8	5.3	2.0
Edmonton-Ellerslie	NDP	Hold	55.9	-9.5	61.7	10.8	5.9
Edmonton-Glenora	NDP	Hold	57.1	-4.2	69.2	10.5	6.1
Edmonton-Gold Bar	NDP	Hold	64.7	-4.3	69.5	10.0	5.8
Edmonton-Highlands-Norwood	NDP	Hold	46.3	-5.5	71.5	8.0	4.1
Edmonton-Manning	NDP	Hold	51.0	-8.7	59.8	9.7	4.8
Edmonton-McClung	NDP	Hold	57.5	-6.8	59.5	15.9	7.2
Edmonton-Meadows	NDP	Hold	55.4	-9.9	62.6	12.6	6.2
Edmonton-Mill Woods	NDP	Hold	57.3	-7.7	61.7	11.7	5.8
Edmonton-North West	NDP	Hold	53.0	-8.3	59.7	8.0	2.5
Edmonton-Riverview	NDP	Hold	63.7	-6.9	67.1	11.1	5.9
Edmonton-Rutherford	NDP	Hold	64.2	-5.1	65.1	10.2	6.7
Edmonton-South	NDP	Hold	60.4	-10.3	59.0	12.3	8.0
Edmonton-South West	NDP	Gain	61.8	-8.2	56.5	14.7	-8.7
Edmonton-Strathcona	NDP	Hold	59.3	-5.5	79.7	7.6	3.7
Edmonton-West Henday	NDP	Hold	57.8	-8.0	56.8	12.8	7.5
Edmonton-Whitemud	NDP	Hold	65.0	-5.7	60.4	11.2	6.9
Airdrie-Cochrane	UCP	Hold	66.5	-7.5	60.1	-5.9	-9.0
Airdrie-East	UCP	Hold	61.8	-8.4	62.0	-5.3	-10.4
Athabasca-Barrhead-Westlock	UCP	Hold	62.7	-9.7	74.3	5.8	-0.2
Banff-Kananaskis	NDP	Gain	69.2	0.5	49.7	7.7	-5.3
Bonnyville-Cold Lake-St. Paul	UCP	Hold	52.9	-13.0	75.5	2.4	-4.1
Brooks-Medicine Hat	UCP	Hold	58.2	-7.4	66.5	5.8	-1.8
Camrose	UCP	Hold	63.3	-11.3	63.4	-1.9	-5.3
Cardston-Siksika	UCP	Hold	56.1	-9.0	74.1	0.6	-0.6
Central Peace-Notley	UCP	Hold	62.0	-10.3	77.7	2.5	1.7
Chestermere-Strathmore	UCP	Hold	58.9	-8.1	69.7	1.2	-5.5
Cypress-Medicine Hat	UCP	Hold	57.6	-9.8	61.9	-5.2	-7.2
Drayton Valley-Devon	UCP	Hold	63.3	-10.7	73.7	2.6	-1.6
Drumheller-Stettler	UCP	Hold	63.3	-11.4	82.1	5.4	6.9
Fort McMurray-Lac La Biche	UCP	Hold	44.1	-14.1	73.6	7.2	3.6
Fort McMurray-Wood Buffalo	UCP	Hold	42.0	-22.5	67.7	-3.4	-0.7
Fort Saskatchewan-Vegreville	UCP	Hold	61.0	-9.2	58.1	4.4	-1.7
Grande Prairie	UCP	Hold	49.7	-14.2	63.9	0.9	-4.4
Grande Prairie-Wapiti	UCP	Hold	55.7	-15.0	76.2	1.4	-2.2
Highwood	UCP	Hold	67.5	-4.9	68.9	-4.4	-7.9
Innisfail-Sylvan Lake	UCP	Hold	62.5	-10.8	71.6	-2.9	-7.2
Lac Ste. Anne-Parkland	UCP	Hold	62.8	-9.5	69.0	3.2	-0.2
Lacombe-Ponoka	UCP	Hold	61.8	-13.0	67.6	-3.7	-6.2
Leduc-Beaumont	UCP	Hold	62.8	-9.6	56.7	-1.7	-6.9
Lesser Slave Lake	UCP	Hold	51.0	-12.1	65.0	7.3	5.2
Lethbridge-East	UCP	Hold	62.0	-4.8	50.3	-2.1	-5.4
Lethbridge-West	NDP	Hold	61.5	-7.2	53.9	8.7	5.2
Livingstone-Macleod	UCP	Hold	66.2	-3.3	66.9	-3.7	-4.8
Maskwacis-Wetaskiwin	UCP	Hold	58.7	-10.4	67.5	3.4	-0.4
Morinville-St. Albert	UCP	Hold	66.1	-6.7	51.8	1.8	-5.1
Olds-Didsbury-Three Hills	UCP	Hold	63.8	-8.2	75.3	-3.3	-5.2
Peace River	UCP	Hold	49.1	-11.3	72.8	3.4	1.4
Red Deer-North	UCP	Hold	55.8	-10.2	57.5	-3.1	-9.3
Red Deer-South	UCP	Hold	62.5	-9.4	56.1	-4.3	-10.1
Rimbey-Rocky Mountain House-Sundre	UCP	Hold	65.9	-9.3	69.5	-12.2	-8.5
Sherwood Park	NDP	Gain	70.3	-6.3	50.3	10.3	-5.9
Spruce Grove-Stony Plain	UCP	Hold	61.4	-10.3	57.0	-2.4	-6.7
St. Albert	NDP	Hold	66.6	-6.1	58.5	12.3	6.3
Strathcona-Sherwood Park	UCP	Hold	70.0	-6.4	53.1	0.6	-5.9
Taber-Warner	UCP	Hold	57.2	-7.9	75.3	-2.8	-3.5
Vermilion-Lloydminster-Wainwright	UCP	Hold	55.0	-24.8	74.4	-4.4	-6.0
West Yellowhead	UCP	Hold	57.1	-10.7	71.8	3.5	-2.1

= Ridings where one of the top two candidates in either 2019 or 2023 was neither UCP nor NDP

=== Detailed analysis ===
Party rankings (1st to 5th place)
Party	1st	2nd	3rd	4th	5th
United Conservative	49	38			
New Democratic	38	48	1		
Independent		1	13	4	1
Green			26	12	2
Alberta Party			16	3	
Alberta Independence			8	5	1
Liberal			7	4	2
Wildrose Loyalty Coalition			5	7	4
Solidarity Movement			2	17	15
Communist			1	1	1
Wildrose Independence			1	1	
Advantage Party				3	1
Buffalo				1	
Pro-Life					1

Resulting composition of the 31st Legislative Assembly of Alberta
Source		Party		
Source		UCP	NDP	Total
Seats retained	Incumbents returned	36	19	55
Seats retained	Open seats held	12	4	16
Seats retained	Incumbents not renominated	1	1	2
Seats changing hands	Incumbents defeated		12	12
Seats changing hands	Open seats gained		2	2
Total		49	38	87

=== Seats that changed hands ===
==== MLAs who lost their seats ====
Constituency	Party	Name	Year elected	Seat held by party since	Defeated by	Party
Banff-Kananaskis	█ United Conservative	Miranda Rosin	2019	2019	Sarah Elmeligi	█ New Democratic
Calgary-Acadia	█ United Conservative	Tyler Shandro	2019	2019	Diana Batten	█ New Democratic
Calgary-Beddington	█ United Conservative	Josephine Pon	2019	2019	Amanda Chapman	█ New Democratic
Calgary-Currie	█ United Conservative	Nicholas Milliken	2019	2019	Janet Eremenko	█ New Democratic
Calgary-Edgemont	█ United Conservative	Prasad Panda	2015	2019	Julia Hayter	█ New Democratic
Calgary-Falconridge	█ United Conservative	Devinder Toor	2019	2019	Parmeet Singh Boparai	█ New Democratic
Calgary-Foothills	█ United Conservative	Jason Luan	2019	2017	Court Ellingson	█ New Democratic
Calgary-Glenmore	█ United Conservative	Whitney Issik	2019	2019	Nagwan Al-Guneid	█ New Democratic
Calgary-Klein	█ United Conservative	Jeremy Nixon	2019	2019	Lizette Tejada	█ New Democratic
Calgary-Varsity	█ United Conservative	Jason Copping	2019	2019	Luanne Metz	█ New Democratic
Edmonton-South West	█ United Conservative	Kaycee Madu	2019	2019	Nathan Ip	█ New Democratic
Sherwood Park	█ United Conservative	Jordan Walker	2019	2019	Kyle Kasawski	█ New Democratic

==== Open seats changing hands ====
Riding	Party	Candidate	Incumbent retiring from the House	Won by	Party
Calgary-Elbow	█ United Conservative	Chris Davis	Doug Schweitzer (resigned on August 31, 2022)	Samir Kayande	█ New Democratic
Calgary-North East	█ United Conservative	Inder Grewal	Rajan Sawhney (stood in Calgary-North West)	Gurinder Brar	█ New Democratic

== See also ==
- Elections in Canada
- Fixed election dates in Canada
