= Lesser Slave Lake (electoral district) =

Provincial electoral district in Alberta, Canada

Alberta electoral district
- Lesser Slave Lake within Alberta, 2017 boundaries

Provincial electoral district
- Legislature: Legislative Assembly of Alberta
MLA
Scott Sinclair
United Conservative
- District created: 1971
- First contested: 1971
- Last contested: 2023

Lesser Slave Lake is a provincial electoral district for the Legislative Assembly of Alberta, Canada. It has existed since 1971 and is mandated to return a single member using the first past the post method of voting.

The riding is named after the lake of the same name, which is located entirely within its borders.

== Geography ==
Lesser Slave Lake is a predominantly rural riding located in Northern Alberta.

There are no cities in the riding. It includes only two incorporated urban municipalities: the towns of High Prairie and Slave Lake. The riding also includes the entirety of one rural municipality (the Municipal District of Opportunity No. 17) and parts of three others (Big Lakes County, the Municipal District of Lesser Slave River No. 124, and Northern Sunrise County).

Eleven First Nation bands are based in Lesser Slave Lake: Bigstone Cree Nation, Driftpile First Nation, Kapawe'no First Nation, Loon River Cree Nation, Lubicon Lake Indian Nation, Peerless Trout First Nation, Sawridge First Nation, Sucker Creek Cree First Nation, Swan River First Nation, Whitefish Lake First Nation, and Woodland Cree First Nation. Most of the region's Indigenous population is of Cree origin.

The riding borders five other electoral districts: Peace River to the northwest, Fort McMurray-Wood Buffalo to the northeast, Fort McMurray-Lac La Biche to the east, Athabasca-Barrhead-Westlock to the south, and Central Peace-Notley to the west.

== History ==
The electoral district was created in the 1971 boundary re-distribution from the electoral districts of Grouard and Peace River. The district remained largely unchanged until the 1993 boundary re-distribution when the electoral district was extended north to the Northwest Territories, Alberta border.

The 2003 boundary re-distribution saw the district revert to similar boundaries that existed prior to 1993. The 2010 boundary re-distribution saw the district re-aligned with current municipal boundaries with a portion of land on the south end moved into Barrhead-Morinville-Westlock.

In the 2017 electoral boundary re-distribution only minor changes were made to the districts boundaries, which were enlarged to include the Calling Lake Reserve.

Lesser Slave Lake is one of two electoral districts in the province that are afforded the exemption provided in the Electoral Boundaries Commission Act whereby only four electoral districts in Alberta may have a population which is as much as 50% below the average population of all the proposed electoral districts. The rationale for this exemption is the relatively low population in the region and large distances between population centers. The total population of the district in the 2017 re-distribution was 27,818 which is 41% below the provincial average for electoral districts.

=== Boundary history ===
63 Lesser Slave Lake 2003 boundaries
Bordering districts
North	East	West	South
Peace River	Athabasca-Redwater, Fort McMurray-Wood Buffalo, Lac La Biche-St. Paul	Dunvegan-Central Peace, Peace River	Barrhead-Morinville-Westlock, Grande Prairie-Smoky
riding map goes here			
Legal description from Electoral Divisions Act, S.A. 2003, c. E-4.1
Starting at the east boundary of Rge. 12 W5 and the north boundary of Twp. 105; then 1. east along the north boundary of Twp. 105 to the 5th meridian; 2. south along the 5th meridian to the north boundary of Twp. 96; 3. east along the north boundary to the east boundary of Rge. 20 W4; 4. south along the east boundary to the north boundary of Twp. 95; 5. east along the north boundary to the east boundary of Rge. 18 W4; 6. south along the east boundary to the intersection with the right bank of the Athabasca River; 7. upstream along the right bank of the Athabasca River to the north boundary of Twp. 75, Rge. 18 W4; 8. west along the north boundary of Twp. 75 to the east boundary of Rge. 26 W4; 9. south along the east boundary of Rge. 26 W4 to the north boundary of Twp. 68; 10. east along the north boundary of Twp. 68 to the east boundary of Rge. 25 W4; 11. south along the east boundary to the north boundary of Twp. 66; 12. west along the north boundary of Twp. 66 to the east boundary of Sec. 34 in Twp. 66, Rge. 25 W4; 13. south along Secs. 34, 27, 22, 15, 10 and 3 in Twps. 66 and 65 to the north boundary of Twp. 64; 14. west along the north boundary of Twp. 64 to the right bank of the Athabasca River; 15. downstream along the right bank of the Athabasca River to the north boundary of Twp. 67 in Rge. 2 W5; 16. west along the north boundary to the east boundary of Rge. 19 W5; 17. north along the east boundary to the north boundary of Twp. 70; 18. west along the north boundary to the east boundary of Rge. 20 W5; 19. north along the east boundary to the north boundary of Twp. 73; 20. east along the north boundary to the east boundary of Rge. 19 W5; 21. north along the east boundary of Rge. 19 W5 to the north boundary of Twp. 77; 22. west along the north boundary of Twp. 77 to the east boundary of Sec. 3 in Twp. 78, Rge. 19 W5; 23. north along the east boundary of Sec. 3 to the north boundary of Sec. 3 in the Twp.; 24. west along the north boundary of Secs. 3, 4 and 5 to the east boundary of Sec. 7; 25. north along the east boundary of Secs. 7, 18, 19, 30 and 31 in Twp. 78 to the north boundary of Twp. 78; 26. west along the north boundary to the east boundary of Rge. 20 W5; 27. north along the east boundary of Rge. 20 W5 to the north boundary of Twp. 79; 28. east along the north boundary of Twp. 79 to the east boundary of Rge. 18 W5; 29. north along the east boundary of Rge. 18 W5 to the north boundary of Twp. 96; 30. east along the north boundary of Twp. 96 to the east boundary of Rge. 12 W5; 31. north along the east boundary of Rge. 12 W5 to the starting point.
Note:

02 Lesser Slave Lake 2010 boundaries
Bordering districts
North	East	West	South
Peace River	Fort McMurray-Conklin, Fort McMurray-Wood Buffalo and Lac La Biche-St. Paul-Two Hills	Dunvegan-Central Peace-Notley, Grande Prairie-Smoky and Peace River	Athabasca-Sturgeon-Redwater and Barrhead-Morinville-Westlock
Note: Boundary descriptions were not used in the 2010 redistribution

=== Representation history ===
Members of the Legislative Assembly for Lesser Slave Lake
Assembly	Years	Member	Party
Riding created from Grouard, Peace River, Lac Ste. Anne, Pembina and Lac La Biche
17th	1971-1975	Dennis Barton	Social Credit
18th	1975-1979	Larry Shaben	Progressive; Conservative
19th	1979-1982	Larry Shaben	Progressive; Conservative
20th	1982-1986	Larry Shaben	Progressive; Conservative
21st	1986-1989	Larry Shaben	Progressive; Conservative
22nd	1989-1993	Pearl Calahasen	Progressive; Conservative
23rd	1993-1997	Pearl Calahasen	Progressive; Conservative
24th	1997-2001	Pearl Calahasen	Progressive; Conservative
25th	2001-2004	Pearl Calahasen	Progressive; Conservative
26th	2004-2008	Pearl Calahasen	Progressive; Conservative
27th	2008–2012	Pearl Calahasen	Progressive; Conservative
28th	2012–2015	Pearl Calahasen	Progressive; Conservative
29th	2015–2019	Danielle Larivee	New Democrat
30th	2019–2021	Pat Rehn	United Conservative
30th	2021	Pat Rehn	Independent
30th	2021–2023	Pat Rehn	United Conservative
31st	2023–2025	Scott Sinclair	United Conservative
31st	2025–2026	Scott Sinclair	Independent
31st	2026–present	Scott Sinclair	United Conservative

The electoral district was created in 1971. Prior to the districts creation the area had elected Social Credit MLA's. The first election saw a tight race between Social Credit candidate Dennis Barton and Progressive Conservative candidate Garth Roberts. Barton eked out a win with just 41% of the popular vote.

Barton would be defeated in the 1975 election by Progressive Conservative candidate Larry Shaben who rolled up a landslide majority. Shaben would serve four terms in office and hold three different cabinet portfolios under the governments of Peter Lougheed and Don Getty before retiring from office in 1989.

The third representative of the riding was Progressive Conservative candidate Pearl Calahasen who was elected to her first term in 1989 in a tight three-way race winning less than half the popular vote. She would also serve some ministerial portfolios from 1996 to 2006 in the government of Ralph Klein. She represented the district for seven terms, becoming the longest-serving female MLA in Alberta history, as well as the longest-serving Indigenous MLA.

In the 2015 election, Calahasen placed third of three candidates and was defeated by the NDP's Danielle Larivee, who served in several ministerial portfolios during the 29th Assembly.

== Legislative election results ==
=== 2023 ===
2023 Alberta general election
Party	Candidate	Votes	%	±%
United Conservative	Scott Sinclair	5,171	65.04	+7.35
New Democratic	Danielle Larivee	2,636	33.15	-2.95
Solidarity Movement	Bert Seatter	144	1.81	–
Total		7,951	99.36	–
Rejected and declined		51	0.64	
Turnout		8,002	49.03	
Eligible voters		16,322		
United Conservative hold		Swing		+5.15
Source(s) Source: Elections Alberta

=== Elections in the 2010s ===
2019 Alberta general election
Party	Candidate	Votes	%	±%
United Conservative	Pat Rehn	5,873	57.59	+0.62
New Democratic	Danielle Larivee	3,676	36.11	-6.83
Alberta Party	Vincent Rain	381	3.74	–
Alberta Independence	Suzette Powder	251	2.47	–
Total valid votes		10,181	99.43	–
Rejected, spoiled, and declined		58	0.57	–
Turnout		10,239	63.38	–
Eligible electors		16,164	–	
United Conservative notional hold		Swing		+3.72
Source(s) Source: "70 - Lesser Slave Lake 2019 General Election Results". Elections Alberta.

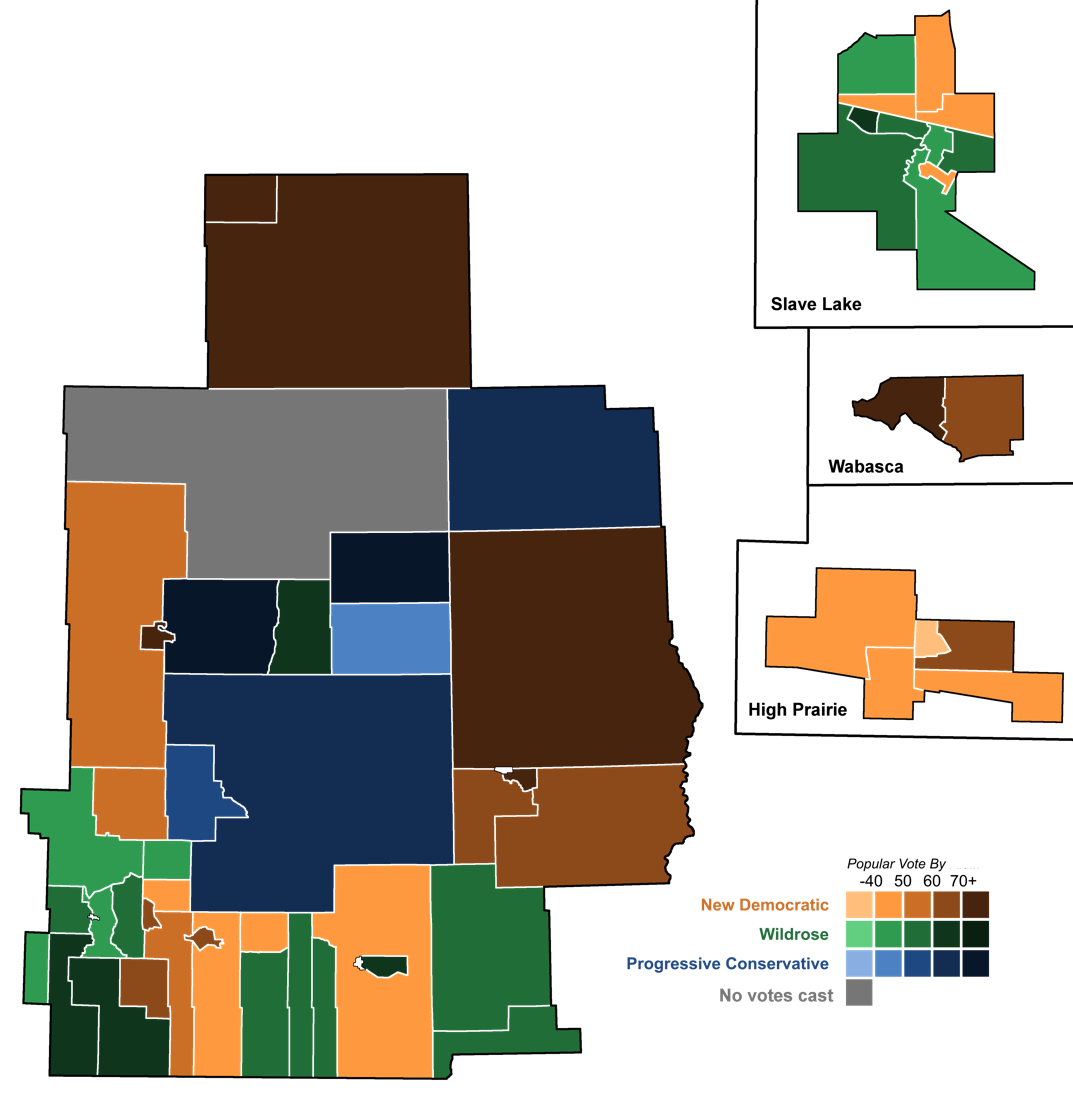
results by polling division, 2015

2015 Alberta general election
Party	Candidate	Votes	%	±%
New Democratic	Danielle Larivee	3,915	43.23%	+37.32%
Wildrose	Darryl Boisson	3,198	35.31%	-4.11%
Progressive Conservative	Pearl Calahasen	1,944	21.46%	-27.25%
Total valid votes		9,057	100.00%	
Rejected, spoiled and declined		50		
Eligible voters / turnout		20,277	44.91%	+6.07%
New Democratic gain from Progressive Conservative		Swing		+32.29%
Source(s) "2015 Provincial General Election Results". Elections Alberta. Archived from the original on March 30, 2022.

2015 Alberta general election redistributed results
Party	Votes	%
New Democratic	3,940	42.93
Wildrose	3,255	35.47
Progressive Conservative	1,982	21.60
Source(s) Source: Ridingbuilder

2012 Alberta general election
Party	Candidate	Votes	%	±%
Progressive Conservative	Pearl Calahasen	3,518	48.71%	-16.47%
Wildrose	Darryl Boisson	2,847	39.42%	
New Democratic	Steve Kaz	427	5.91%	-2.30%
Liberal	Steven Townsend	235	3.25%	-9.29%
Independent	Donald G. Bissell	195	2.70%	
Total		7,222	100.00%	
Rejected, spoiled and declined		50		
Eligible electors / Turnout		18,723	38.84%	+13.06%
Progressive Conservative hold		Swing		-27.95%
Source(s) "Electoral Division Results: Lesser Slave Lake".

=== Elections in the 2000s ===
2008 Alberta general election
Party	Candidate	Votes	%	±%
Progressive Conservative	Pearl Calahasen	3,384	65.18%	+0.24%
Liberal	Steve Noskey	1,109	21.36%	+12.54%
New Democratic	Habby Sharkawi	426	8.21%	+2.32%
Greens	Bonnie Raho	273	5.26%	+1.03%
Total		5,192	100.00%	
Rejected, spoiled and declined		43		
Eligible electors / Turnout		20,310	25.78%	-5.72%
Progressive Conservative hold		Swing		-6.39%
Source(s) The Report on the March 3, 2008 Provincial General Election of the Twenty-seventh Legislative Assembly. Elections Alberta. July 28, 2008. pp. 462–467.

2004 Alberta general election
Party	Candidate	Votes	%	±%
Progressive Conservative	Pearl Calahasen	3,903	64.94%	-9.22%
Alberta Alliance	Valerie Rahn	969	16.12%	
Liberal	Jonathan Plackaitis	530	8.82%	-13.41%
New Democratic	Doris Bannister	354	5.89%	2.28%
Greens	Ian Hopfe	254	4.23%	
Total		6,010	100.00%	
Rejected, spoiled and declined		57		
Eligible electors / Turnout		19,259	31.50%	-14.14%
Progressive Conservative hold		Swing		-12.67%
Source(s) "Lesser Slave Lake Statement of Official Results 2004 Alberta general election" (PDF). Elections Alberta.

2001 Alberta general election
Party	Candidate	Votes	%	±%
Progressive Conservative	Pearl Calahasen	4,766	74.16%	+13.58%
Liberal	Rick Noel	1,429	22.23%	+1.87%
New Democratic	Doris Bannister	232	3.61%	-4.29%
Total		6,427	100.00%	
Rejected, spoiled and declined		47		
Eligible electors / Turnout		14,185	45.64%	+3.55%
Progressive Conservative hold		Swing		+7.73%
Source(s) "Lesser Slave Lake Official Results 2001 Alberta general election" (PDF). Elections Alberta.

=== Elections in the 1990s ===
1997 Alberta general election
Party	Candidate	Votes	%	±%
Progressive Conservative	Pearl Calahasen	3,389	60.58%	+5.10%
Liberal	Ralph Chalifoux	1,139	20.36%	-19.92%
Social Credit	Robert Alford	624	11.16%	
New Democratic	Glenn Laboucan	442	7.90%	+3.66%
Total		5,594	100.00%	
Rejected, spoiled and declined		23		
Eligible electors / Turnout		13,368	42.09%	-18.39%
Progressive Conservative hold		Swing		+12.51%
Source(s) "1997 general election". Elections Alberta. Archived from the original on February 14, 2012.

1993 Alberta general election
Party	Candidate	Votes	%	±%
Progressive Conservative	Pearl Calahasen	4,260	55.48%	+7.90%
Liberal	Denise Wahlstrom	3,093	40.28%	+6.81%
New Democratic	Larry Sakaluk	326	4.24%	-14.71%
Total		7,679	100.00%	
Rejected, spoiled and declined		24		
Eligible electors / Turnout		12,743	60.48%	+3.85%
Progressive Conservative hold		Swing		+7.36%
Source(s) "Lesser Slave Lake Official Results 1993 Alberta general election". Alberta Heritage Community Foundation.

=== Elections in the 1980s ===
1989 Alberta general election
Party	Candidate	Votes	%	±%
Progressive Conservative	Pearl Calahasen	3,249	47.58%	-9.62%
Liberal	Denise Wahlstrom	2,286	33.47%	
New Democratic	Philip Lukken	1,294	18.95%	-23.85%
Total		6,829	100.00%	
Rejected, spoiled and declined		9		
Eligible electors / Turnout		12,074	56.63%	+17.38%
Progressive Conservative hold		Swing		-16.74%
Source(s) "Lesser Slave Lake Official Results 1989 Alberta general election". Alberta Heritage Community Foundation.

1986 Alberta general election
Party	Candidate	Votes	%	±%
Progressive Conservative	Larry Shaben	2,529	57.20%	-0.57%
New Democratic	Bert Dube	1,892	42.80%	+26.04%
Total		4,421	100.00%	
Rejected, spoiled and declined		24		
Eligible electors / Turnout		11,326	39.25%	-17.44%
Progressive Conservative hold		Swing		-13.59%
Source(s) "Lesser Slave Lake Official Results 1986 Alberta general election". Alberta Heritage Community Foundation.

1982 Alberta general election
Party	Candidate	Votes	%	±%
Progressive Conservative	Larry Shaben	3,150	57.77%	+11.75%
New Democratic	Gary Kennedy	914	16.76%	+0.86%
Western Canada Concept	Garth Lodge	607	11.13%	
Liberal	Joseph Blyan	466	8.55%	+5.15%
Independent	George Keay	316	5.79%	
Total		5,453	100.00%	
Rejected, spoiled and declined		27		
Eligible electors / Turnout		9,667	56.69%	-4.48%
Progressive Conservative hold		Swing		+6.31%
Source(s) "Lesser Slave Lake Official Results 1982 Alberta general election". Alberta Heritage Community Foundation.

=== Elections in the 1970s ===
1979 Alberta general election
Party	Candidate	Votes	%	±%
Progressive Conservative	Larry Shaben	2,313	46.02%	-12.21%
Social Credit	Peter Moore	1,743	34.68%	+12.21%
New Democratic	Mike Poulter	799	15.90%	-3.40%
Liberal	Dan Backs	171	3.40%	
Total		5,026	100.00%	
Rejected, spoiled and declined		22		
Eligible electors / Turnout		8,252	61.17%	+9.02%
Progressive Conservative hold		Swing		-12.21%
Source(s) "Lesser Slave Lake Official Results 1979 Alberta general election". Alberta Heritage Community Foundation.

1975 Alberta general election
Party	Candidate	Votes	%	±%
Progressive Conservative	Larry Shaben	2,387	58.23%	+25.72%
Social Credit	Dennis Barton	921	22.47%	-19.02%
New Democratic	John Tomkins	791	19.30%	+4.11%
Total		4,099	100.00%	
Rejected, spoiled and declined		23		
Eligible electors / Turnout		7,904	52.15%	-10.10%
Progressive Conservative gain from Social Credit		Swing		+22.37%
Source(s) "Lesser Slave Lake Official Results 1975 Alberta general election". Alberta Heritage Community Foundation.

1971 Alberta general election
Party	Candidate	Votes	%
Social Credit	Dennis Barton	1,830	41.49%
Progressive Conservative	Garth Roberts	1,434	32.51%
New Democratic	Marie Carlson	670	15.19%
Liberal	Stan Daniels	246	5.58%
Independent	Allan Crawford	231	5.23%
Total		4,411	100.00%
Rejected, spoiled and declined		55	
Eligible electors / Turnout		7,174	62.25%
Social Credit pickup new district.			
Source(s) "Lesser Slave Lake Official Results 1971 Alberta general election". Alberta Heritage Community Foundation.

== Senate nominee election results ==
=== 2004 ===
2004 Senate nominee election results: Lesser Slave Lake				Turnout 30.88%	
Affiliation	Candidate	Votes	% votes	% ballots	'Rank
Progressive Conservative	Betty Unger	2,431	15.19%	48.60%	2
Progressive Conservative	Bert Brown	2,324	14.52%	46.46%	1
Progressive Conservative	Cliff Breitkreuz	1,850	11.56%	36.99%	3
Progressive Conservative	David Usherwood	1,539	9.62%	30.77%	6
Progressive Conservative	Jim Silye	1,513	9.46%	30.25%	5
Alberta Alliance	Michael Roth	1,388	8.68%	27.75%	7
Alberta Alliance	Vance Gough	1,364	8.52%	27.27%	8
Alberta Alliance	Gary Horan	1,335	8.34%	26.69%	10
Independent	Link Byfield	1,310	8.19%	26.19%	4
Independent	Tom Sindlinger	947	5.92%	18.93%	9
Total votes		16,001	100%		
Total ballots		5,002	3.20 votes per ballot		
Rejected, spoiled and declined		945			

Voters had the option of selecting four candidates on the ballot

== Student vote results ==
=== 2004 ===
Participating schools
Gift Lake School
Kinuso School
Mistassiniy School
Pelican Mountain School
Roland Michener Secondary School
Smith School

On November 19, 2004, a student vote was conducted at participating Alberta schools to parallel the 2004 Alberta general election results. The vote was designed to educate students and simulate the electoral process for persons who have not yet reached the legal majority. The vote was conducted in 80 of the 83 provincial electoral districts with students voting for actual election candidates. Schools with a large student body that reside in another electoral district had the option to vote for candidates outside of the electoral district then where they were physically located.

2004 Alberta student vote results
Affiliation	Candidate	Votes	%
Progressive Conservative	Pearl Calahasen	190	35.71%
Liberal	Jonathan Plackaitis	116	21.81%
Green	Ian Hopfe	98	18.42%
NDP	Doris Bannister	76	14.29%
Alberta Alliance	Valerie Rahn	52	9.77%
Total		532	100%
Rejected, spoiled and declined		21	

== See also ==
- List of Alberta provincial electoral districts
- Canadian provincial electoral districts
