= ATB Financial =

Canadian financial institution

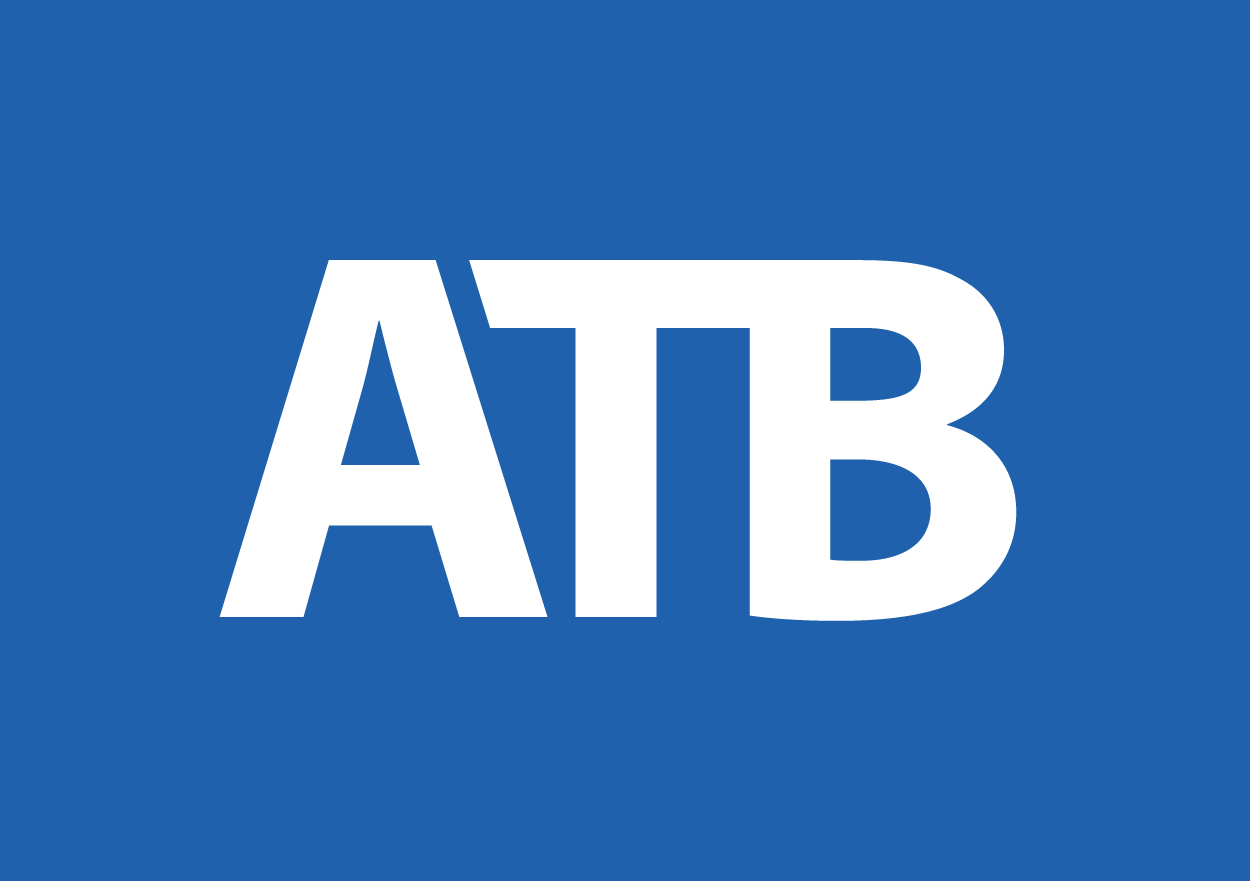

- ATB Place in Downtown Edmonton
- Formerly: Alberta Treasury Branches (1938–2017)
- Type: Crown corporation
- Industry: Financial services
- Founded: September 29, 1938; 88 years ago
- Headquarters: ATB Place, Edmonton, Alberta
- Number of locations: 300+
- Area served: Alberta
- Key people: Chris Turchansky (President & CEO); Joan Hertz (Chair)
- Products: Retail and business financial services, Wealth Management
- Revenue: ▲ C$2.19 billion (2025)
- Net income: ▲ C$0.35 billion (2025)
- AUM: ▲ C$37.17 billion (2025)
- Total assets: ▲ C$64.19 billion (2025)
- Total equity: ▲ C$5.68 billion (2025)
- Owner: Government of Alberta
- Number of employees: 5,000 (2025)
- Website: www.atb.com

ATB Financial is a financial institution and Crown corporation wholly owned by the province of Alberta, the only province in Canada with such a financial institution under its exclusive ownership.

Established as Alberta Treasury Branches in 1938, ATB Financial operates only in Alberta and provides financial services to over 800,000 Albertan residents and businesses. It is the largest public bank in North America and Alberta's largest financial institution based in the province. Headquartered in Edmonton, ATB Financial has over 5000 employees.

ATB is not a chartered bank, meaning it is not regulated by the Canadian federal government under the Bank Act and associated regulations. ATB is instead regulated entirely by the Government of Alberta under the authority of the ATB Financial Act and associated regulations; the legislation is modeled on the statutes, regulations, and guidelines which govern banks and other federally chartered financial institutions. ATB is not a member of the Canada Deposit Insurance Corporation or Alberta's provincial Credit Union Deposit Guarantee Corporation; deposits are instead fully guaranteed by the Government of Alberta itself. ATB Financial was one of fifteen financial institutions that participated in Canada's Large Value Transfer System.

== History ==
=== Background ===
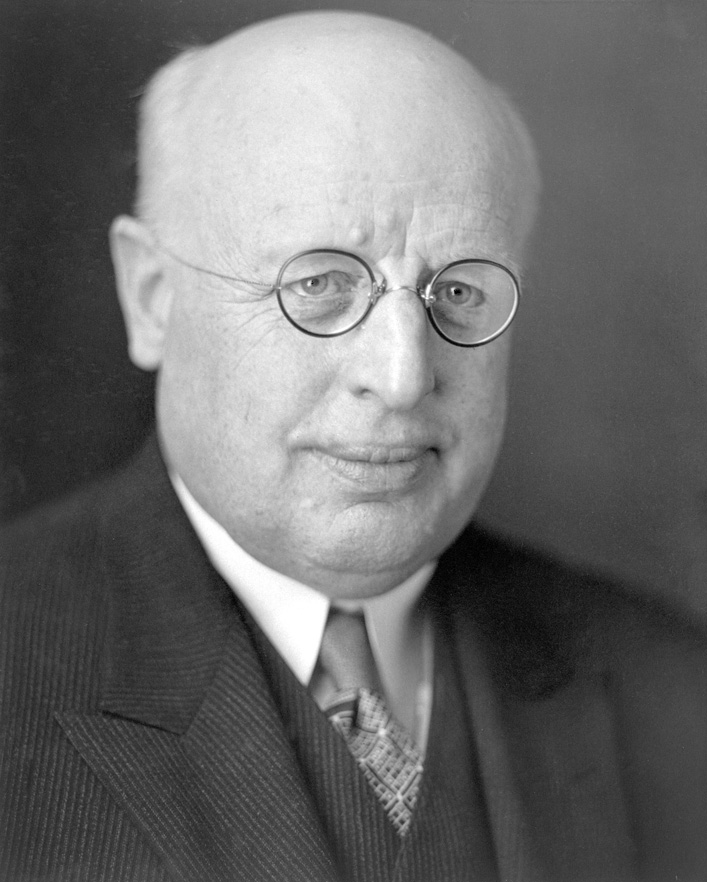
Premier William Aberhart

The Alberta Treasury Branches were created by the Social Credit government of Premier William Aberhart in 1938, with its roots dating back to political unrest in 1917 arising from the unmet credit demands of the West. Prior to ATB Financial's formation, Aberhart and Social Credit swept into power in the 1935 Alberta election in a wave of unrest following scandals surrounding the United Farmers Premier John Edward Brownlee. Aberhart's government sought radical monetary reform in a province which was devastated by the Great Depression, as well as greater economic autonomy from both the federal government and financial institutions based largely in Toronto and Montréal.

However, in two years Aberhart's government failed to bring forward promised reforms, which resulted in a backbencher revolt forcing the government to pass three pieces of controversial financial reform acts. Credit of Alberta Regulation Act required all bankers to obtain a licence from the Social Credit Commission, Bank Employees Civil Rights Act prevented unlicensed banks and their employees from initiating civil actions, and Judicature Act Amendment Act prevented any person from challenging the constitutionality of Alberta's laws in court without receiving the approval of the Lieutenant-Governor in Council. In August 1937, the federal government disallowed all three acts. The Supreme Court of Canada, in answering reference questions posed by the federal government, unanimously ruled that such disallowance was valid.

Aberhart returned with three new bills, Bank Taxation Act (Bill 1) levying provincial taxes on banks' paid-up capital and reserve funds at punitive rates, Credit of Alberta Regulation Act, 1937 (Bill 8) similar to the previous disallowed act, but covering all "credit institutions", and Accurate News and Information Act (Bill 9) requiring newspapers to print "clarifications" of stories considered inaccurate by the Social Credit Board, and to reveal their sources on demand, and also authorizing the provincial government to prohibit the publication of any newspaper, any article by a given writer, or any article making use of a given source. All three bills were reserved by Lieutenant Governor John C. Bowen, and the federal government posed the reference questions to the Supreme Court. In Reference Re Alberta Statutes the Supreme Court ruled all three bills as ultra vires.

=== Formation ===
Aberhart sought to create a State Credit House which facilitated some banking services in small communities where larger banks had previously closed. Subsequently, the Aberhart government created the Alberta Treasury Branches through a series of Orders in Council in late-August and early-September 1938, following the judicial defeat at the Supreme Court of legislation passed by the Social Credit government. The Aberhart government authorized the Treasury Department to establish "branches of the provincial treasury" and with $200,000 of provincial funds as capital, the first Alberta Treasury Branch was opened in Rocky Mountain House on September 29, 1938, followed by branches in Edmonton, Andrew, Grande Prairie, Killam, and St. Paul which opened the next day. The first employees of the Treasury Branches were provincial civil servants with previous banking experience, many of whom were transferred from the Treasury Department's Sales Tax Branch following the abolishment of the provincial sales tax. Besides banking, the Treasury Branches served as government offices and propaganda centres.

The Aberhart government was able to utilize the Treasury Branches to operate the "Interim Program", which was an attempt to provide the citizen's dividend promised by the Social Credit government in 1935. The Interim Program's name indicated the temporary nature of the program, which would remain in place until a complete system of Social Credit could be established in Alberta. Under the interim program, the Treasury Branches issued non-negotiable transfer vouchers in place of regular currency that could be redeemed at participating merchants in the province. Consumers who purchased goods from participating merchants that were partially produced in Alberta would earn a "bonus" in their account of up to three per cent, the full bonus (in the form of transfer vouchers) being earned if one-third of a consumers aggregate monthly purchases were "Alberta-made". The one-third Alberta-made program was generally ineffective in increasing domestic market demand as it was easy for consumers to meet the low threshold over the period of one month. In response, the threshold on Alberta-made products was raised to one-half in February 1941.

Transfer vouchers could also be used for payments to the provincial government, including taxes, licence fees, and other provincial debts. The transfer voucher system worked considerably better than the previous attempt to issue a citizen's dividend in the form of prosperity certificates in 1936.

The Treasury Branches proved popular amongst Albertans, resulting in the government establishing 22 branches and 270 branch agencies by June 1939. The Treasury Branches were first authorized to provide loans in 1941 to be approved under a centralized "loan committee" overseen by the Treasury Branches Superintendent. Expanding into lending services was necessary to gain a stronger presence in retail areas, as many merchants who operate with the Treasury Branches also maintained a separate account at another bank to ensure access to credit.

The only services provided up to 1943 were term savings accounts at 1.5 to 3 per cent interest, and the sale of automobile, hunting and fishing licences. Furthermore, the government charged consumers a two per cent penalty on cash withdrawals to continue to incentivize Albertans to use non-negotiable transfer vouchers to ensure capital did not flow out of the branches. Merchants were provided a means to withdraw a certain amount of cash without being charged a penalty in order to replace goods sold for vouchers. A formula was developed to determine the "basic rate", the amount of cash the merchant could withdraw without penalty by taking the merchant's annual profit margin as a percentage and subtracting it from 100 per cent (i.e. 10% margin less 100% means 90% of the balance is available to be withdrawn without penalty). The calculation basic rate system was deemed cumbersome and replaced in February 1941 with a centralized list compiled by the Department of Industries and Labour, based on the type of products and services sold and the location of the business. By early 1942 there were over 7,125 merchants enrolled under the interim program.

Government employees were partially paid with Treasury Branch vouchers, with single employees, widows and widowers receiving 15 per cent of their salary in voucher form. Married employees were paid between 15 and 25 per cent of their salary in vouchers, and the calculation was made after all deductions. This policy encouraged employees to use the service instead of other banks. The bonus system ceased in April 1945 and a contingency of $480,738 was paid out of the province's general revenue fund to a reserve fund for the purpose of covering the cumulative earned bonuses during the program.

The Treasury Branches proved to be successful as deposits grew to $24-million by 1946, and by 1950 there were 45 Treasury Branches, six sub-branches, and 110 agencies employing 331 staff.

=== Changes in 1950s and 1960s ===
During the 1955 Alberta election the Treasury Branches came under scrutiny for allegations of preferential treatment for loans to members of the Legislative Assembly (MLAs), as well as preferential contracts awarded to firms indebted to the provincial government. The Treasury Branches provided significant loans to a handful of road construction companies, with the firm Sparling-Davis provided $4.5-million in loans, which was more than 20 per cent of the Treasury Branches overall loans. Premier Ernest Manning reluctantly approved a Royal Commission to look into the lending practices of the Treasury Branches the day before the 1955 election, the commission was led by Hugh John Macdonald and James Mahaffy. The commission was provided with narrow terms of reference and found there was no evidence of maladministration or wrongdoing by the government or the Treasury Branches. Prior to the formation of the commission the government responded to the allegations by introducing a bill in 1955 which prevented MLAs from borrowing from the Treasury Branches.

The 1967 Royal Commission on Banking and Finance led by Justice Dana Porter recommended that a deposit insurance scheme be implemented for Canadian banks. Subsequently, in 1969 the 16th Alberta Legislature passed The Treasury Branch Deposits Guarantee Act which provided a provincial guarantee for the deposits of the Treasury Branches.

=== Oil and gas boom and bust ===
The Alberta economy grew significantly in the 1970s and early 1980s due to the rising price of oil. Total loans issued by the Treasury Branches grew from $10.6-million in 1950 to $1.9-billion by 1981.

However, despite significant growth, prosperity would not last forever. All Alberta industries suffered in the early 1980s owing to high interest rates, low world commodity prices, and the National Energy Program. The Treasury Branches were no exception, posting the first of six consecutive years of losses in 1983. Other regional financial institutions suffered at this time with the collapse of the Canadian Commercial Bank and the Northland Bank in 1985. By 1989 the Treasury Branches had an accumulated deficit of CA$150 million.

ATB was the subject of scandal in the late 1980s after clients such as Peter Pocklington's Gainers Foods and the Ghermezian Brothers' West Edmonton Mall defaulted on loans.

The Treasury Branches did begin to innovate in the early 1980s as well, joining the Canadian Payments Association in 1983 allowed the institution to clear cheques, and the Branches developed an interest rate shielding policy for agricultural customers and delivered special payments on behalf of the government's residential mortgage loan program. In 1984 the Treasury Branches offered US dollar savings accounts in partnership with Citibank. Automated teller machines were introduced in 1989 and in 1990 the Treasury Branches became the first Canadian financial institution to offer telephone banking services.

=== 1990s ===
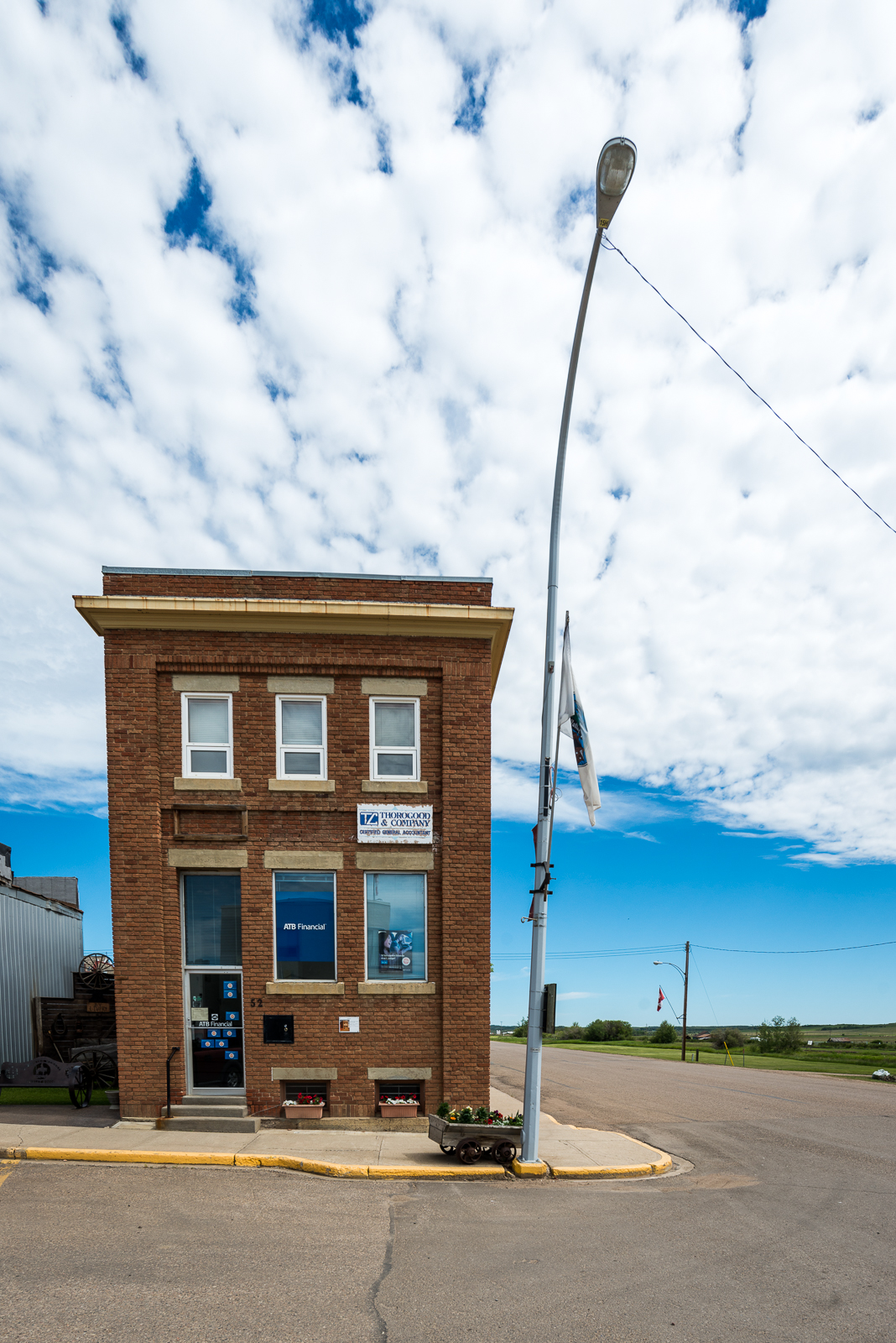
ATB Financial Branch in Big Valley.

In the 1990s, the government reformed Alberta Treasury Branches with the intention of transforming it into a financial institution that could compete with Canadian chartered banks. Public trust was eroded during the 1980s and 1990s as high-risk loans with political motivations eroded the Treasury Branches financial footing, including a $100-million loss in 1996.

By 1994, there were 142 Treasury Branches, 125 agencies, 3,000 staff and 80 automated teller machines in Alberta. The Klein government appointed Gordon Flynn to review the Treasury Branches operations, Flynn recommended a number of changes including greater autonomy, financial accountability measures and the appointment of a Board of Directors. Flynn's recommendations were reviewed by a working group chaired by former federal finance minister Don Mazankowski, which provided nine further recommendations for the operations of ATB. Mazankowski recommended the government articulate the public policy goals and benchmarks for the institution, ATB must operate at an arms-length from the government, operate under a board of directors, be provided equal treatment against other private sector banks, modernized to foster competition with modern banks, offer new and in demand financial services and products, deliver programs with a for profit emphasis, remain cost conscious and profit motivated, and be subject to an accountability regime similar to the private sector.

Provincial Treasurer Jim Dinning quickly introduced legislation to create an independent board of directors made up of government appointees was established in 1996 and ATB formally became an autonomous provincial Crown corporation on October 8, 1997. The government also appointed former Metropolitan Life CEO Paul Haggis as the new superintendent of ATB in 1996.

=== 2000s to present ===
The Alberta Treasury Branches rebranded in January 2002 as ATB Financial in an effort to gain stronger brand recognition in urban areas such as Calgary and Edmonton. By 2002 ATB Financial controlled 15 per cent of the province's retail banking, but lagged in the cities with seven per cent in Calgary and eight per cent in Edmonton. The official change of name for the crown corporation did not occur until 2017.

ATB was not immune to the 2008 financial crisis, when over $1.2-billion of non-bank sponsored asset-backed commercial paper became illiquid. The financial crisis resulted in special provisions for credit loss of $253-million and $225-million in 2008 and 2009. Alberta's Auditor-General noted that inappropriate incentives may have been to blame for insufficient due diligence on for the losing securities. The Progressive Conservative government responded in July 2009 when Finance Minister Iris Evans announced a number of government programs to strengthen ATB's balance sheet including providing $600-million in notational capital, and changes to requirements for capital adequacy test.

In 2015, the New Democratic government capitalized ATB Financial with an additional $1.5-billion to promote lending access to small and medium-sized businesses. In 2021 Fast Company named ATB Financial one its 100 Best Workplaces for Innovators in the International category. Based in Calgary, it had a three-year-old incubator, ATB Ventures.

In 2025, ATB Financial acquired Cormark Securities Inc, to expand its investment banking activities.

== Controversies ==
=== West Edmonton Mall scandal ===
In 1998 ATB filed a lawsuit against the former acting superintendent of the bank and the Ghermezian family alleging the family bribed the official to issue a commercially unreasonable loan guarantee for West Edmonton Mall. The $65-million, 30-year loan in question was issued at no interest, and fully guaranteed a $353.5-million loan provided by Toronto Dominion Bank, both occurring on October 31, 1994. The loan agreement also provided unusual concessions such as allowing dividends to continue to be paid, prevents ATB from initiating foreclosure proceedings for 20 years and included a lease that allowed the Ghermezian family the right to manage the mall for 99 years. The former superintendent claimed the financing occurred on the orders of Premier Ralph Klein and other provincial politicians, although a probe by the auditor general found no evidence of government direction. The lawsuit was settled in December 2002, with details of the settlement remaining private.

=== Privatization proposals ===
Throughout its history ATB Financial has remained a prominent candidate for proponents of privatization in Alberta. Under Premier Ralph Klein the Government of Alberta moved to privatize government corporations and services. The Klein mantra of "getting government out of the business of business" applied to several government owned businesses that competed against similar private companies. ATB as a financial institution competed against chartered banks and credit unions, making it prime target for privatization. The government review led by Gordon Flynn recommended privatization; however, support from the Progressive Conservative rural caucus, and the ongoing and high-profile West Edmonton Mall lawsuit in the late 1990s created significant uncertainty for the value of ATB, scuttling any plans for privatization.

In its 2018 report, the Parkland Institute argued against privatization of ATB Financial noting the policy implications available to the Government of Alberta through a fully government controlled financial institution. The Parkland Institute argued ATB could be used to provide low cost financing to Albertans, financing social housing, financing climate change goals, purchasing government debt and providing for agricultural growth. The Parkland Institute further argues against privatization due to the vast network of rural and remote branches ATB operates, which would not be financially viable for a traditional bank without a similar mandate.

In March 2019, Finance Minister Joe Ceci revealed the Government of Alberta had received a detailed offer from Scotiabank to purchase ATB Financial; however, the amount offered to privatize ATB was not provided by Ceci.

== Financials ==
As of May 24, 2018, ATB reported assets of $51.9 billion, deposits of $32.7 billion, loans of $44.1 billion, and a net income of $274.6 million.

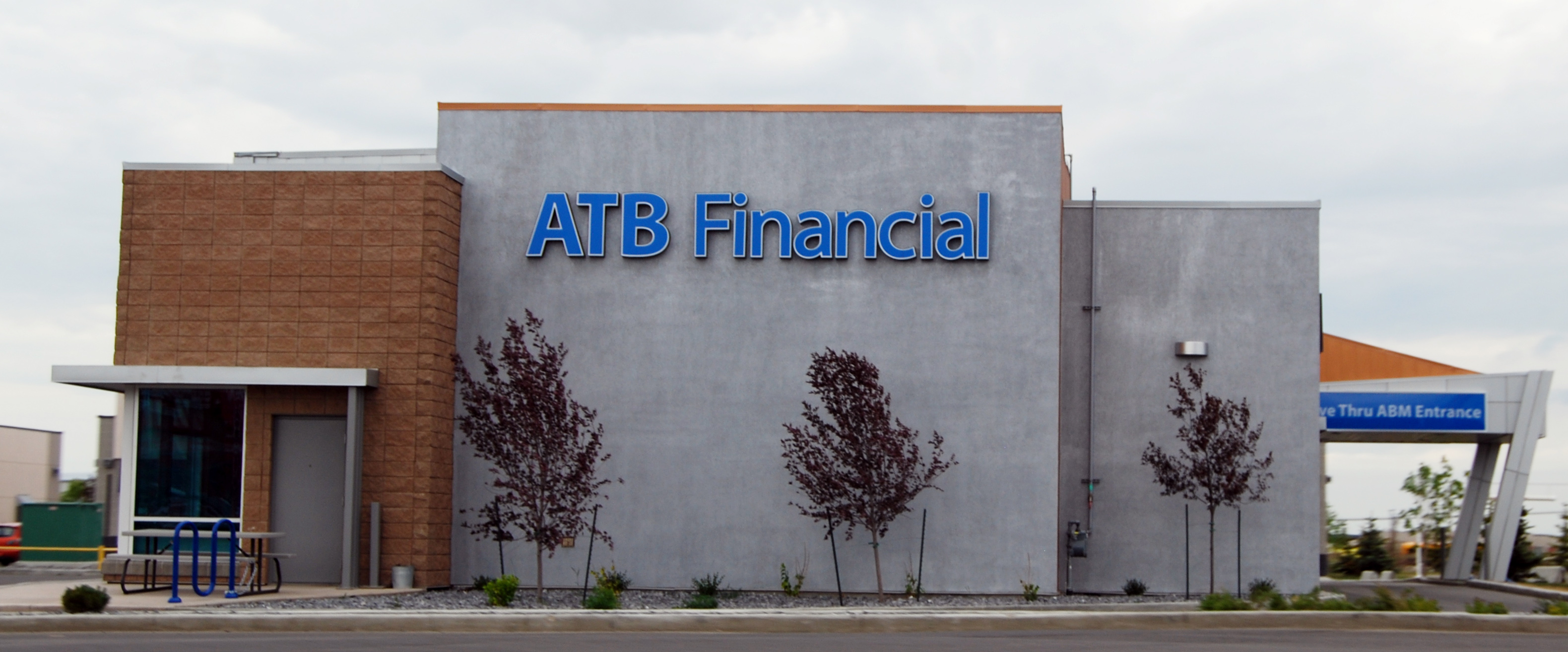
ATB Branch, Edmonton.

== Awards ==
- In 2017, ATB Financial was named second best workplace in all of Canada by Great Place to Work.
- In 2015, ATB Financial was named one of Alberta's Top Employers by Mediacorp Canada Inc.
- Ranked 4 of Canada's Top 50 Best Workplaces, Large and Multinational in 2016.
- Received two governance awards from the Canadian Society of Corporate Secretaries in 2014.
- Awarded Outstanding Corporation award in the Edmonton Philanthropy Day celebrations.
- ATB Financial won the People's Choice Award for Alberta BoostR at the 2014 North America Corporate Entrepreneur Awards

== Memberships ==
- Alberta Regional Network (ARN)
- Canadian Payments Association
- Cirrus (interbank network)
- Interac
- MasterCard Canada
- NYCE
- Visa Inc

== See also ==
- List of banks and credit unions in Canada
- ATB Place
- Prosperity certificate
- Province of Ontario Savings Office (Government of Ontario savings bank 1922–2003)
