= Kyle Kasawski =

Canadian politician from Alberta

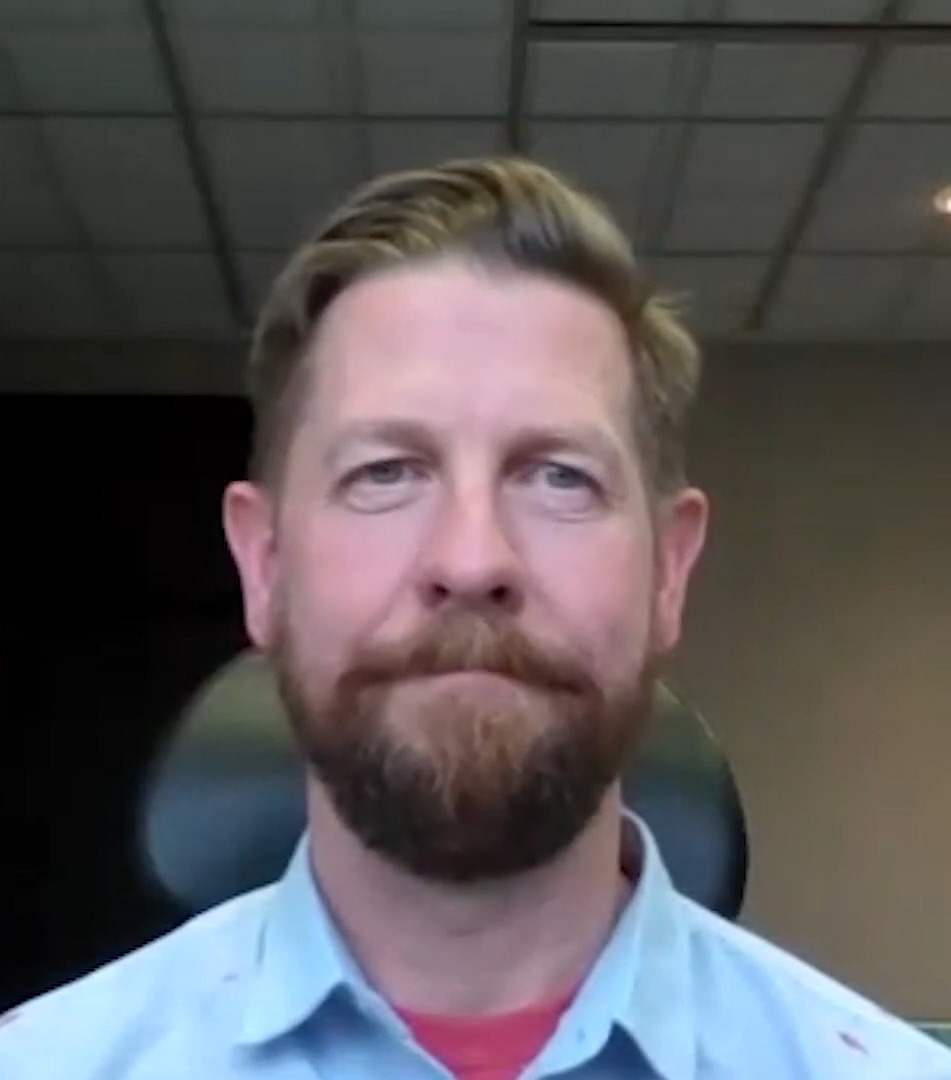
- Kasawski in 2024

Member of the Legislative Assembly of Alberta for Sherwood Park
- Incumbent
- Assumed office May 29, 2023
- Preceded by: Jordan Walker

Personal details
- Party: Alberta NDP
- Occupation: Politician, entrepreneur, businessperson

Kyle Kasawski is a Canadian politician from the Alberta New Democratic Party who was elected as a Member of the Legislative Assembly of Alberta for Sherwood Park in the 2023 Alberta general election. He serves as the Official Opposition Shadow Minister for Affordability and Utilities.

== Early life and career ==
Kasawski graduated from the University of Alberta with a degree in geography and urban planning. Before entering politics, Kasawski worked in the renewable energy industry. He was recognized in Edify's Top 40 under 40 in 2011 for his work in solar energy. Kasawski has taught at the Northern Alberta Institute of Technology and at McGill University.

== Political career ==
Kasawski became the Alberta NDP's candidate for the 2023 Alberta general election in the riding of Sherwood Park after winning a contested nomination race in September, 2022. In that election, he unseated the United Conservative Party's, Jordan Walker, becoming the second NDP MLA to represent Sherwood Park, a riding previously held by Annie McKitrick.

He was named as the NDP's Critic for Municipal Affairs (Mid-Sized Cities & Rural Alberta) in June, 2023, eventually becoming the caucus' sole Shadow Minister for Municipal Affairs in September, 2024 under newly-elected Alberta NDP leader, Naheed Nenshi.

In December, 2024, Kasawski was chosen as "MLA to Watch" in the 2024 edition of political columnist Dave Cournoyer's Best of Alberta Politics Survey.

Kasawski replaced Sharif Haji as the Alberta NDP's Shadow Minister for Affordability and Utilities in October, 2025.

== Electoral history ==
=== 2023 general election ===
2023 Alberta general election: Sherwood Park
Party	Candidate	Votes	%	±%
New Democratic	Kyle Kasawski	13,108	50.27	+10.27
United Conservative	Jordan Walker	11,447	43.90	-1.47
Alberta Party	Sue Timanson	1,293	4.96	-8.18
Liberal	Jacob Stacey	225	0.86	–
Total		26,073	–	
Rejected and declined		128	0.63	
Turnout		26,201	70.32	
Eligible voters		37,259		
New Democratic gain from United Conservative		Swing		+5.87
Source(s) Source: Elections Alberta
