= ATB Okotoks Classic =

- Established: 2020
- Host city: Okotoks, Alberta
- Arena: Okotoks Curling Club
- Purse: $42,000
- 2026 champion: (Manitoba) Matt Dunstone

Current edition
- 2026 ATB Okotoks Classic

The ATB Okotoks Classic is an annual bonspiel, or curling tournament, held at the Okotoks Curling Club in Okotoks, Alberta. It has been held since 2020. The event is sponsored by ATB Financial, a financial institution in Alberta.

The 2022 event was the first leg in the "Players Tour presented by Curling Live".

The event has been won three times by Brendan Bottcher (2020, 2022, 2023) who defeated Kevin Koe in each of the three finals. Marc Kennedy, Brett Gallant and Ben Hebert have all also won three times, twice with Bottcher (2022, 2023) and once with Brad Jacobs in 2025.

== Past champions ==
Year	Winning team	Runner up team	Purse (CAD)
2020	(Alberta) Brendan Bottcher, Darren Moulding, Bradley Thiessen, Karrick Martin	(Alberta) Kevin Koe, B. J. Neufeld, John Morris, Ben Hebert	$23,000
2021	(Alberta) Kevin Koe, B. J. Neufeld, John Morris, Ben Hebert	(Scotland) Ross Whyte, Robin Brydone, Duncan McFadzean, Euan Kyle	$29,000
2022	(Alberta) Brendan Bottcher, Marc Kennedy, Brett Gallant, Ben Hebert	(Alberta) Kevin Koe, Tyler Tardi, Brad Thiessen, Karrick Martin	$50,000
2023	(Alberta) Brendan Bottcher, Marc Kennedy, Brett Gallant, Ben Hebert	(Alberta) Kevin Koe, Tyler Tardi, Jacques Gauthier, Karrick Martin	$50,000
2024	(Saskatchewan) Mike McEwen, Colton Flasch, Kevin Marsh, Dan Marsh	(United States) John Shuster, Chris Plys, Colin Hufman, John Landsteiner	$50,000
2025	(Alberta) Brad Jacobs, Marc Kennedy, Brett Gallant, Ben Hebert	(United States) John Shuster, Chris Plys, Colin Hufman, Matt Hamilton	$50,000
2026	(Manitoba) Matt Dunstone, Colton Lott, Mark Nichols, Ryan Harnden	(Switzerland) Philipp Hösli (Fourth), Marco Hösli (Skip), Simon Gloor, Justin Hausherr	$42,000
