= 2013 Strathcona County municipal election =

← 2010	October 21, 2013	2017 →

Mayor and 8 councilors to Strathcona County Council
Candidate	Roxanne Carr	Linda Osinchuk
Last election	ran as councillor	13,299
Popular vote	12,583	12,137
Percentage	50.9%	49.1%
- Results of the County Council election
Mayor before election
Linda Osinchuk
Elected mayor
Roxanne Carr

The 2013 Strathcona County municipal election was held Monday, October 21, 2013. From 1968 to 2013, provincial legislation has required every municipality to hold elections every three years. The Alberta Legislative Assembly passed a bill on December 5, 2012, amending the Local Authorities Election Act. Starting with the 2013 elections, officials are elected for a four-year term, and municipal elections are moved to a four-year cycle.

The citizens of Strathcona County, Alberta, elected one mayor, eight councillors (one from each of eight wards), five of the Elk Island Public Schools Regional Division No. 14's nine trustees (three from subdivision #2, and one from each of subdivisions #3 and #4), and five of the Elk Island Catholic Separate Regional Division No. 41's seven trustees (supporters in Sherwood Park and Fort Saskatchewan). Strathcona County includes Sherwood Park, an urban service area deemed equivalent of a city.

== Results ==
Bold indicates elected, and incumbents are italicized.

=== Mayor ===
Mayor
Candidate	Votes	%
**Roxanne Carr**	**12,583**	**50.9**
Linda Osinchuk	12,137	49.1

=== Councillors ===
Councillors
Candidate	Votes	%	Candidate	Votes	%	Candidate	Votes	%
Ward 1			Ward 2			Ward 3		
**Victor Bidzinski**	**1,819**	**46.4**	**Dave Anderson**	**1,759**	**43.5**	**Brian Botterill**	**1,719**	**49.9**
Ben Proulx	1,147	29.2	Nicole Vankuppeveld	1,180	29.2	Don Jaffray	1,017	29.5
Murray Hutchinson	958	24.4	Ryan Osterberg	860	21.3	Bryan Mortensen	709	20.6
			Dan Carter	249	6.2			
Ward 4			Ward 5			Ward 6		
**Carla Howatt**	**1,578**	**59.7**	**Paul Smith**	**1,140**	**50.0**	**Linton Delainey**	**1,477**	**63.3**
Joseph Akle	642	24.3	Clinton Alexander	1,119	49.5	Colin Reid	522	22.4
Marie Lynne Kaiser	425	16.1				Garett Blackwell	334	14.3
Ward 7			Ward 8					
**Bonnie Riddell**	**936**	**50.8**	**Fiona Beland-Quest**	**2,766**	**69.9**			
Terrell Fletcher	907	49.2	Jason Gariepy	1,192	30.1			

=== Public School Trustees ===
The Elk Island Public School Board consists of nine trustees, one from Lamont County, two from Fort Saskatchewan, three from Sherwood Park (subdivision 2), one from Strathcona County north (subdivision 3), one from Strathcona County south (subdivision 4), and one from the County of Minburn No. 27.

Elk Island Public Schools Regional Division No. 14
Subdivision 2			Subdivision 3			Subdivision 4		
Candidate	Votes	%	Candidate	Votes	%	Candidate	Votes	%
**Lynn Patterson**	**7,477**	**23.5**	**William (Skip) Gordon**	**1,275**	**59.2**	**Jim Seutter**	**1,982**	**72.1**
**Barb McNeill**	**6,084**	**19.1**	Dean James Kakoscke	880	40.8	Lori Tootoosis-Friesen	769	28.0
**Trina Boymook**	**5,864**	**18.4**						
Sally Navis	5,087	16.0						
Dean Cummings	4,662	14.6						
Paul Kruger	2,716	8.5						

=== Separate School Trustees ===
The Elk Island Catholic Separate School Board consists of seven trustees, four from Sherwood Park, one from Camrose, one from Vegreville, and one from Fort Saskatchewan.

Elk Island Catholic Separate Regional Division No. 41
Sherwood Park
Candidate	Votes	%
**Michelle Szott**	**3,741**	**19.9**
**Tony Sykora**	**3,723**	**19.8**
**Jean Boisvert**	**3,205**	**17.1**
**Ted Paszek**	**3,167**	**16.9**
Le-Ann Ewaskiw	2,656	14.2
Joann Lloyd	2,279	12.1
