= Large Value Transfer System =

Money-wiring process in Canada

The Large Value Transfer System, or LVTS, was the primary system in Canada for electronic wire transfers of large sums of money, and was operated by Payments Canada. It permitted the participating institutions and their clients to send large sums of money securely in real-time with complete certainty that the payment will settle. In September 2021, Payments Canada replaced LTVS with its Lynx high-value payment system.

Established in 1999, LVTS processed the majority of payments made every day in Canada, and was designed to work with funds in Canadian dollars (CAD). On a normal business day, it cleared and settled approximately CA$398 billion. Frequently, when settling the payments made through LVTS between each other, some banks found themselves with extra funds while others found themselves short; to come up with money, the banks were able borrow it from each other for a day, or "overnight". The rate at which they borrowed being called overnight rate, targets for which were set by the Bank of Canada as part of its monetary policy.

LVTS was a real-time payment system: the recipient of the payment received it irrevocably in near real-time. As it settled on a deferred net basis at the end of each day, it was not a real-time gross settlement system.

== Participating institutions ==
As of July 2025, there were 16 institutions, including the Bank of Canada, participating in LVTS:

- ATB Financial
- Bank of America National Association
- Bank of Canada
- Bank of Montreal
- BNP Paribas (Canada)
- CIBC
- Central 1 Credit Union (which represents BC and Ontario credit unions)
- Citibank
- Desjardins Group (French: Fédération des caisses Desjardins du Quebec)
- ICICI Bank Canada
- Laurentian Bank of Canada
- National Bank of Canada
- Royal Bank of Canada
- Scotiabank
- State Street Bank and Trust Company
- Toronto-Dominion Bank

== See also ==
- Real Time Gross Settlement
