= Sherwood Park—Fort Saskatchewan =

Federal electoral district in Alberta, Canada

Alberta electoral district
- Interactive map of riding boundaries from the 2025 federal election

Federal electoral district
- Legislature: House of Commons
MP
Garnett Genuis
Conservative
- District created: 2013
- First contested: 2015
- Last contested: 2025
- District webpage: profile, map

Demographics
- Population (2011): 111,541
- Electors (2019): 95,317
- Area (km²): 1,271
- Pop. density (per km²): 87.8
- Census division: Division No. 11
- Census subdivision(s): Strathcona, Fort Saskatchewan

Sherwood Park—Fort Saskatchewan is a federal electoral district in Alberta, Canada, that has been represented in the House of Commons of Canada since 2015.

Sherwood Park—Fort Saskatchewan was created by the 2012 federal electoral boundaries redistribution and was legally defined in the 2013 representation order. It came into effect upon the call of the 42nd Canadian federal election. It was created out of parts of Edmonton—Sherwood Park and Vegreville—Wainwright.

== Demographics ==
According to the 2011 Canadian census

Languages: 90.2% English, 2.2% French, 1.8% German, 1.1% Ukrainian
Religions: 67.3% Christian (26.8% Catholic, 10.0% United Church, 5.5% Lutheran, 4.2% Anglican, 2.3% Baptist, 1.6% Christian Orthodox, 1.5% Pentecostal, 15.4% Other), 30.6% No religion
Median income (2010): $44,302
Average income (2010): $60,210

Panethnic groups in Sherwood Park—Fort Saskatchewan (2011−2021)
Panethnic group	2021		2016		2011	
Panethnic group	Pop.	%	Pop.	%	Pop.	%
European (Note: Statistic includes all persons that did not make up part of a visible minority or an indigenous identity.)	106,145	85.4%	106,785	88.41%	99,920	90.6%
Indigenous	6,515	5.24%	5,305	4.39%	4,590	4.16%
Southeast Asian (Note: Statistic includes total responses of "Filipino" and "Southeast Asian" under visible minority section on census.)	3,810	3.07%	2,680	2.22%	1,420	1.29%
South Asian	3,155	2.54%	2,165	1.79%	1,515	1.37%
East Asian (Note: Statistic includes total responses of "Chinese", "Korean", and "Japanese" under visible minority section on census.)	1,460	1.17%	1,495	1.24%	1,100	1%
African	1,395	1.12%	955	0.79%	670	0.61%
Latin American	740	0.6%	525	0.43%	570	0.52%
Middle Eastern (Note: Statistic includes total responses of "West Asian" and "Arab" under visible minority section on census.)	435	0.35%	420	0.35%	190	0.17%
Other/multiracial (Note: Statistic includes total responses of "Visible minority, n.i.e." and "Multiple visible minorities" under visible minority section on census.)	635	0.51%	460	0.38%	325	0.29%
Total responses	124,295	98.4%	120,790	98.85%	110,290	98.88%
Total population	126,313	100%	122,193	100%	111,541	100%
Notes: Totals greater than 100% due to multiple origin responses. Demographics based on 2012 Canadian federal electoral redistribution riding boundaries.

== Members of Parliament ==
This riding has elected the following members of the House of Commons of Canada:

Parliament	Years	Member	Party
Sherwood Park—Fort Saskatchewan; Riding created from Edmonton—Sherwood Park and Vegreville—Wainwright
42nd	2015–2019	Garnett Genuis	Conservative
43rd	2019–2021	Garnett Genuis	Conservative
44th	2021–2025	Garnett Genuis	Conservative
45th	2025–present	Garnett Genuis	Conservative

== Election results ==
Graph of election results in Sherwood Park - Fort Saskatchewan (minor parties that never got 2% of the vote or didn't run consistently are omitted; *Most of the "Other" vote belonged to James Ford)

2025 Canadian federal election
Party	Candidate	Votes	%	±%	Expenditures
Conservative	Garnett Genuis	54,131	66.32	+8.77	$67,911.50
Liberal	Tanya Holm	22,178	27.17	+14.94	$27,327.98
New Democratic	Chris Jones	4,136	5.07	–15.57	$12,811.92
People's	Jay Sobel	497	0.61	–6.40	none listed
Green	Randall Emmons	448	0.55	–0.43	none listed
Canadian Future	Mark Horseman	237	0.29	–	$295.37
Total valid votes/expense limit		81,627	99.63	–	$148,372.54
Total rejected ballots		301	0.37	–0.05	
Turnout		81,928	77.98	+4.52	
Eligible voters		105,059			
Conservative notional hold		Swing		+12.17	
Source: Elections Canada

2021 federal election redistributed results
Party	Vote	%
Conservative	41,092	57.55
New Democratic	14,740	20.64
Liberal	8,730	12.23
People's	5,004	7.01
Green	700	0.98
Others	1,132	1.59

2021 Canadian federal election
Party	Candidate	Votes	%	±%	Expenditures
Conservative	Garnett Genuis	41,092	57.55	–15.82	$54,552.91
New Democratic	Aidan Bradley Theroux	14,740	20.65	+8.51	$7,370.63
Liberal	Tanya Holm	8,730	12.23	+2.16	$23,831.90
People's	John Wetterstrand	5,004	7.01	+5.18	$8,937.40
Maverick	Todd Newberry	849	1.19	–	$5,182.19
Green	Sheldon Jonah Perris	700	0.98	–1.20	none listed
Independent	Charles Simpson	283	0.40	–	$7,678.37
Total valid votes/expense limit		71,398	99.58	–	$124,070.52
Total rejected ballots		298	0.42	–0.02	
Turnout		71,696	73.46	–2.83	
Eligible voters		97,600			
Conservative hold		Swing		–12.16	
Source: Elections Canada

2019 Canadian federal election
Party	Candidate	Votes	%	±%	Expenditures
Conservative	Garnett Genuis	53,600	73.37	+9.43	$56,462.67
New Democratic	Aidan Bradley Theroux	8,867	12.14	+2.33	$8,662.98
Liberal	Ron Thiering	7,357	10.07	–10.35	$9,484.96
Green	Laura Elizabeth Sanderson	1,592	2.18	–0.29	none listed
People's	Darren Villetard	1,334	1.83	–	$1,638.00
Veterans Coalition	Patrick McElrea	300	0.41	–	none listed
Total valid votes/expense limit		73,050	99.56	–	$119,505.94
Total rejected ballots		321	0.44	+0.17	
Turnout		73,371	76.29	+2.23	
Eligible voters		96,171			
Conservative hold		Swing		+3.55	
Source: Elections Canada

2015 Canadian federal election
Party	Candidate	Votes	%	±%	Expenditures
Conservative	Garnett Genuis	42,642	63.94	+14.48	$137,300.11
Liberal	Rod Frank	13,615	20.42	+13.95	$23,559.35
New Democratic	Joanne Cave	6,540	9.81	–1.42	$15,414.43
Green	Brandie Harrop	1,648	2.47	–1.59	$3,796.57
Independent	James Ford	1,563	2.34	–26.44	$5,420.41
Libertarian	Stephen C. Burry	678	1.02	–	$2,387.73
Total valid votes/expense limit		66,686	99.73	–	$228,934.10
Total rejected ballots		180	0.27	–	
Turnout		66,866	74.06	–	
Eligible voters		90,289			
Conservative hold		Swing		+0.27	
Source: Elections Canada

2011 federal election redistributed results
Party	Vote	%
Conservative	24,890	49.46
Others	14,485	28.78
New Democratic	5,649	11.23
Liberal	3,254	6.47
Green	2,046	4.07

== See also ==
- List of Canadian electoral districts
- Historical federal electoral districts of Canada
