= Sherwood Park (electoral district) =

Provincial electoral district in Alberta, Canada

Coordinates: 53.540°N 113.31°W

Alberta electoral district
- Sherwood Park within the Edmonton Metropolitan Region, 2017 boundaries

Provincial electoral district
- Legislature: Legislative Assembly of Alberta
MLA
Kyle Kasawski
New Democratic
- District created: 1986
- First contested: 1986
- Last contested: 2023

Sherwood Park is a provincial electoral district for the Legislative Assembly of Alberta, Canada.

== History ==
The electoral district was created in the 1986 boundary redistribution from the old electoral district of Edmonton-Sherwood Park. The 2010 boundary redistribution kept the district unchanged from its 2003 boundaries.

=== Boundary history ===
74 Sherwood Park 2003 boundaries
Bordering districts
North	East	West	South
Edmonton-Beverly-Clareview and Strathcona	Strathcona	Edmonton-Highlands-Norwood, Edmonton-Gold Bar and Edmonton-Mill Creek	Strathcona
riding map goes here			
Legal description from the Statutes of Alberta 2003, Electoral Divisions Act.
Starting at the intersection of the right bank of the North Saskatchewan River and the east Edmonton city boundary at the centre line of Highway 16; then 1. east along Highway 16 to the intersection with Clover Bar Road; 2. southwest and southeast along Clover Bar Road to Wye Road (Highway 630); 3. west along Wye Road and the Sherwood Park Freeway to the east Edmonton city boundary at 34 Street; 4. north, west and north along the east Edmonton city boundary to the starting point.
Note:

78 Sherwood Park 2010 boundaries
Bordering districts
North	East	West	South
Edmonton-Beverly-Clareview and Fort Saskatchewan-Vegreville	Strathcona-Sherwood Park	Edmonton-Gold Bar	Edmonton-Mill Creek and Strathcona-Sherwood Park
Legal description from the Statutes of Alberta 2010, Electoral Divisions Act.
See Legal description from the Statutes of Alberta 2003, Electoral Divisions Act.
Note: The district remained unchanged in 2010.

=== Representation history ===
Members of the Legislative Assembly for Sherwood Park
Assembly	Years	Member	Party
See Edmonton-Sherwood Park 1979-1986
21st	1986-1989	Peter Elzinga	Progressive; Conservative
22nd	1989-1993	Peter Elzinga	Progressive; Conservative
23rd	1993-1997	Bruce Collingwood	Liberal
24th	1997-2001	Iris Evans	Progressive; Conservative
25th	2001-2004	Iris Evans	Progressive; Conservative
26th	2004-2008	Iris Evans	Progressive; Conservative
27th	2008–2012	Iris Evans	Progressive; Conservative
28th	2012–2015	Cathy Olesen	Progressive; Conservative
29th	2015–2019	Annie McKitrick	New Democrat
30th	2019–2023	Jordan Walker	United Conservative
31st	2023–	Kyle Kasawski	New Democrat

Prior to the electoral district's creation in the 1986 boundary redistribution. The Sherwood Park area had been returning Progressive Conservative MLA's in its antecedent districts since 1971.

The 1986 election returned former Member of Parliament Peter Elzinga who resigned his federal seat to run in the Alberta provincial election. He was appointed to the provincial cabinet by Premier Don Getty to serve as Minister of Agriculture.

Elzinga was re-elected in the 1989 election in a hotly contested race taking half of the popular vote. He kept his ministerial portfolio and did not run for office again in 1993 instead being hired to manage the first of a number of Progressive Conservative provincial campaigns for Premier Ralph Klein.

The 1993 election chose Liberal candidate Bruce Collingwood. The Liberals had made significant gains in the constituency the past two elections rising from 13% in 1986 to winning in 1993 with just under half the popular vote. Collingwood ran for a second term in office in 1997 but was defeated by Progressive Conservative candidate Iris Evans.

Evans was appointed to the provincial cabinet in 1999 as Minister of Children's Services. She was re-elected with a landslide majority to her second term in 2001. Her popularity dropped significantly in the 2004 election as she fell to just under half the popular vote. Evans kept her seat in cabinet and she became Minister of Health and Wellness until 2006.

After 2006 when Premier Ed Stelmach came to power Evans was appointed as Minister of Employment and Immigration which she held until the 2008 election where she was returned to her fourth term with another landslide majority. After the election she became Minister of Finance until 2010 and then Minister of Intergovernmental Relations until Stelmach retired. She was not invited back into cabinet when Premier Allison Redford came to power in the fall of 2011.

== Legislative election results ==
=== 2023 ===
2023 Alberta general election
Party	Candidate	Votes	%	±%
New Democratic	Kyle Kasawski	13,108	50.27	+10.27
United Conservative	Jordan Walker	11,447	43.90	-1.47
Alberta Party	Sue Timanson	1,293	4.96	-8.18
Liberal	Jacob Stacey	225	0.86	–
Total		26,073	–	
Rejected and declined		128	0.63	
Turnout		26,201	70.32	
Eligible voters		37,259		
New Democratic gain from United Conservative		Swing		+5.87
Source(s) Source: Elections Alberta

=== Elections in the 2010s ===
2019 Alberta general election
Party	Candidate	Votes	%	±%
United Conservative	Jordan Walker	12,119	45.37	-2.96
New Democratic	Annie McKitrick	10,685	40.00	-11.65
Alberta Party	Sue Timanson	3,509	13.14	+13.12
Alberta Independence	Brian Ilkuf	216	0.81	–
Alberta Advantage Party	Chris Glassford	183	0.69	–
Total		26,712	99.34	–
Rejected, spoiled and declined		178	0.66	
Turnout		26,890	76.69	
Eligible voters		35,061		
United Conservative notional gain from New Democratic		Swing		+4.35
Source(s) Source: "81 - Sherwood Park, 2019 Alberta general election". officialresults.elections.ab.ca. Elections Alberta. Alberta. Chief Electoral Officer (2019). 2019 General Election. A Report of the Chief Electoral Officer. Volume II (PDF) (Report). Vol. 2. Edmonton, Alta.: Elections Alberta. pp. 394–398. ISBN 978-1-988620-12-1.

2015 Alberta general election
Party	Candidate	Votes	%	±%
New Democratic	Annie McKitrick	11,365	52.05	+45.74
Progressive Conservative	Cathy Olesen	5,655	25.90	-19.72
Wildrose	Linda Osinchuk	4,815	22.05	-8.97
Total valid votes		21,835		
Rejected, spoiled, and declined		143		
Registered electors / turnout		33,048	66.50	+3.76
New Democratic gain from Progressive Conservative		Swing		+32.73
Source(s) Elections Alberta. "Electoral Division Results: Sherwood Park".

2015 Alberta general election redistributed results
Party	Votes	%
New Democratic	11,499	51.65
Progressive Conservative	5,866	26.35
Wildrose	4,893	21.98
Alberta Party	3	0.01
Liberal	1	0.00
Source(s) Source: Ridingbuilder

2012 Alberta general election
Party	Candidate	Votes	%	±%
Progressive Conservative	Cathy Olesen	8,747	45.62	−17.52
Wildrose	Garnett Genuis	5,948	31.02	
Liberal	Dave Anderson	1,837	9.58	−16.48
New Democratic	Sarah Michelin	1,210	6.31	+0.18
Independent	James Ford	1,064	5.55	
Alberta Party	Chris Kuchmak	230	1.20	
Social Credit	Gordon Barrett	137	0.71	
Total valid votes		19,173		
Rejected, spoiled, and declined		184		
Registered electors / turnout		30,851	62.74	+15.06
Progressive Conservative hold		Swing		−24.27
Source(s) Elections Alberta. "Electoral Division Results: Sherwood Park".

=== Elections in the 2000s ===
2008 Alberta general election
Party	Candidate	Votes	%	±%
Progressive Conservative	Iris Evans	9,312	63.14	+15.16
Liberal	Louise Rogers	3,843	26.06	-10.83
New Democratic	Katharine Hay	904	6.13	-0.45
Greens	Rick Hoines	689	4.67	+2.28
Total		14,748		
Rejected, spoiled, and declined		41		
Eligible electors / Turnout		31,015	47.68	
Progressive Conservative hold		Swing		+13.00
Source(s) The Report on the March 3, 2008 Provincial General Election of the Twenty-seventh Legislative Assembly. Elections Alberta. July 28, 2008. pp. 524–527.

2004 Alberta general election
Party	Candidate	Votes	%	±%
Progressive Conservative	Iris Evans	7,281	48.08	-16.09
Liberal	Louise Rogers	5,587	36.89	+8.85
New Democratic	Tim Sloan	996	6.58	-1.21
Social Credit	Gordon Barrett	474	3.13	
Alberta Alliance	Cora Labonte	444	2.93	
Greens	Lynn Lau	362	2.39	
Total		15,144		
Rejected, spoiled, and declined		49		
Eligible electors / Turnout		26,501	57.33	
Progressive Conservative hold		Swing		-12.47%
Source(s) "Sherwood Park Statement of Official Results 2004 Alberta general election" (PDF). Elections Alberta.

2001 Alberta general election
Party	Candidate	Votes	%	±%
Progressive Conservative	Iris Evans	13,243	64.17	+16.28
Liberal	Louise Rogers	5,787	28.04	-18.15
New Democratic	Chris Harwood	1,606	7.79	+1.87
Total		20,636		
Rejected, spoiled and declined		56		
Eligible electors / Turnout		31,837	64.99	
Progressive Conservative hold		Swing		+17.22
Source(s) "2001 Statement of Official results Sherwood Park" (PDF). Elections Alberta.

=== Elections in the 1990s ===
1997 Alberta general election
Party	Candidate	Votes	%	±%
Progressive Conservative	Iris Evans	8,610	47.89	+7.51
Liberal	Bruce Collingwood	8,305	46.19	-0.77
New Democratic	Vaughn Dyrland	1,064	5.92	-5.85
Total		17,979		
Rejected, spoiled and declined		32		
Eligible electors / Turnout		27,815	64.75	
Progressive Conservative gain from Liberal		Swing		+4.14
Source(s) "1997 General Election". Elections Alberta.

1993 Alberta general election
Party	Candidate	Votes	%	±%
Liberal	Bruce Collingwood	7,798	46.96	+15.92
Progressive Conservative	Doug Fulford	6,704	40.38	-6.28
New Democratic	Jim Gurnett	1,955	11.77	-10.53
Natural Law	Lorne Hoff	147	0.89	
Total		16,604		
Rejected, spoiled and declined		17		
Eligible electors / Turnout		24,952	66.65	
Liberal gain from Progressive Conservative		Swing		+11.10%
Source(s) "Sherwood Park results 1993 Alberta general election". Alberta Heritage Community Foundation. Archived from the original on December 8, 2010.

=== Elections in the 1980s ===
1989 Alberta general election
Party	Candidate	Votes	%	±%
Progressive Conservative	Peter Elzinga	6,462	46.66	-9.79
Liberal	John Convey	4,299	31.04	+17.40
New Democratic	Ted Paszek	3,088	22.30	-5.28
Total		13,849		
Rejected, spoiled and declined		17		
Eligible electors / Turnout		23,233	59.68	
Progressive Conservative hold		Swing		-13.60
Source(s) "Sherwood Park results 1989 Alberta general election". Alberta Heritage Community Foundation. Archived from the original on December 8, 2010.

1986 Alberta general election
Party	Candidate	Votes	%
Progressive Conservative	Peter Elzinga	6,377	56.45
New Democratic	Ted Paszek	3,183	28.18
Liberal	Steven Lindop	1,541	13.64
Representative	Ernie Townsend	196	1.73
Total		11,297	
Rejected, spoiled and declined		8	
Eligible electors / Turnout		20,713	54.58
Progressive Conservative pickup new district.			
Source(s) "Sherwood Park results 1986 Alberta general election". Alberta Heritage Community Foundation. Archived from the original on December 8, 2010.

== Senate nominee election results ==
=== 2004 ===
2004 Senate nominee election results: Sherwood Park				Turnout 57.30%	
Affiliation	Candidate	Votes	% votes	% ballots	Rank
Progressive Conservative	Betty Unger	6,044	16.68%	50.82%	2
Progressive Conservative	Bert Brown	4,383	12.10%	36.85%	1
Independent	Link Byfield	4,320	11.92%	36.32%	4
Progressive Conservative	Cliff Breitkreuz	4,214	11.63%	35.43%	3
Progressive Conservative	David Usherwood	3,289	9.08%	27.65%	6
Alberta Alliance	Michael Roth	3,154	8.71%	26.52%	7
Independent	Tom Sindlinger	2,904	8.02%	24.42%	9
Alberta Alliance	Vance Gough	2,712	7.49%	22.80%	8
Progressive Conservative	Jim Silye	2,617	7.22%	22.00%	5
Alberta Alliance	Gary Horan	2,594	7.15%	21.81%	10
Total votes		36,231	100%		
Total ballots		11,894	3.05 votes per ballot		
Rejected, spoiled and declined		3,291			

Voters had the option of selecting four candidates on the ballot

== Student vote results ==
=== 2004 ===
Participating schools
Clover Bar Junior High School
F. R. Haythorne
Glen Allan Elementary
Holy Spirit Catholic School
Jean Vanier Catholic School
New Horizons School
Sherwood Heights Jr. High
St. Theresa Catholic School

On November 19, 2004, a student vote was conducted at participating Alberta schools to parallel the 2004 Alberta general election results. The vote was designed to educate students and simulate the electoral process for persons who have not yet reached the legal majority. The vote was conducted in 80 of the 83 provincial electoral districts with students voting for actual election candidates. Schools with a large student body that reside in another electoral district had the option to vote for candidates outside of the electoral district then where they were physically located.

2004 Alberta student vote results
Affiliation	Candidate	Votes	%
Progressive Conservative	Iris Evans	862	48.76%
Liberal	Louise Rogers	250	14.14%
Green	Lynn Lau	249	14.08%
NDP	Tim Sloan	193	10.92%
Alberta Alliance	Cora Labonte	134	7.58%
Social Credit	Gordon Barrett	80	4.52%
Total		1,768	100%
Rejected, spoiled and declined		67	

== See also ==
- List of Alberta provincial electoral districts
- Canadian provincial electoral districts
