= Garnett Genuis =

Canadian politician

Garnett Genuis MP
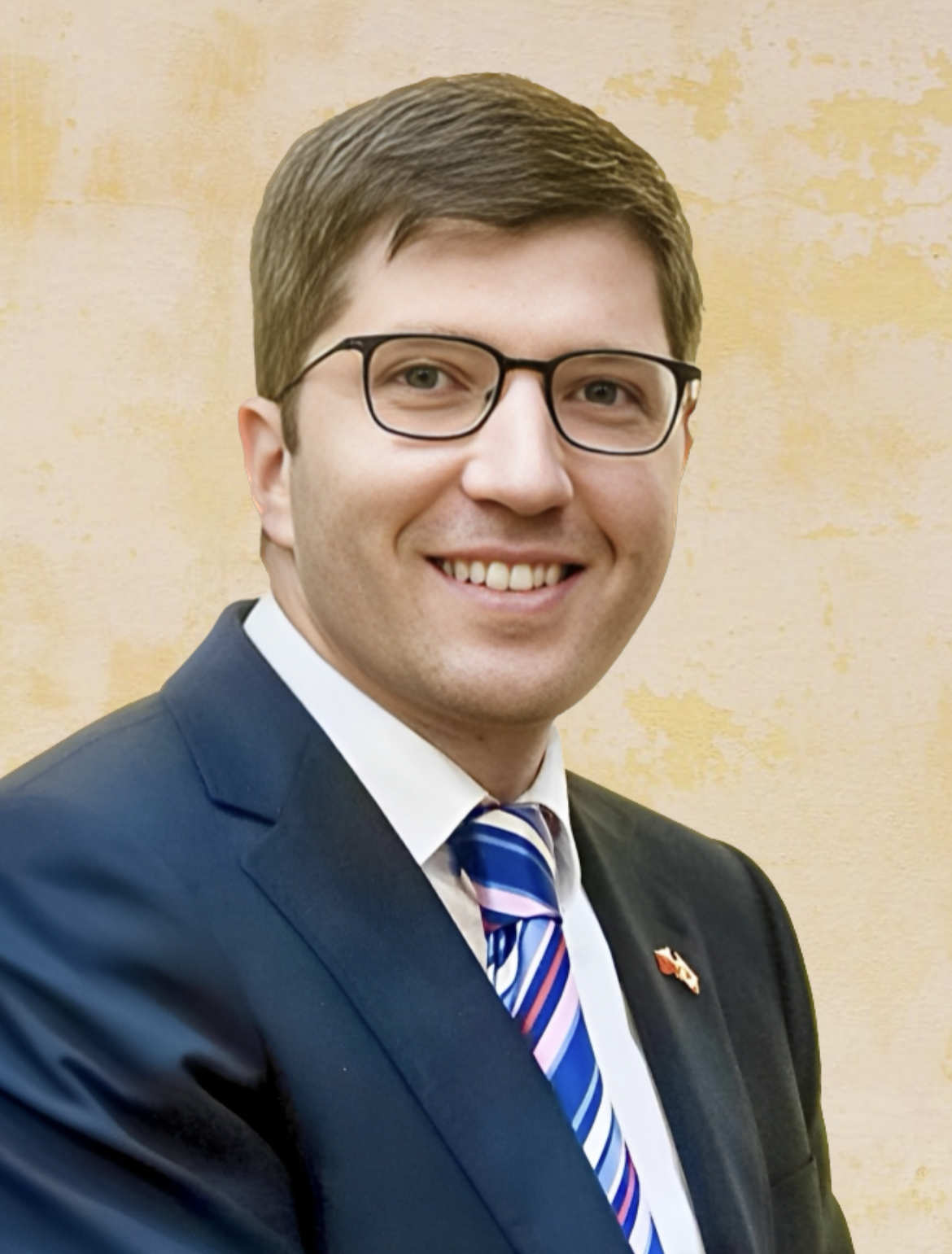
- Genuis in 2023

Member of Parliament for Sherwood Park—Fort Saskatchewan
- Incumbent
- Assumed office October 19, 2015
- Preceded by: Constituency established

Personal details
- Born: January 23, 1987 (age 39) Strathcona County, Alberta, Canada
- Party: Conservative
- Other political affiliations: Provincial: Wildrose (until 2017)
- Spouse: Dr. Rebecca Genuis (m. 2012)
- Children: 6
- Education: Carleton University (B. PAPM); London School of Economics (MSc)

Garnett Genuis MP /dʒɛnɪs/ (born January 23, 1987) is a Canadian politician who has served as the member of Parliament for the riding of Sherwood Park—Fort Saskatchewan (in Alberta) since 2015, and as the Conservative Shadow Minister for Employment since May 2025.

== Early life ==
Genuis was born in 1987 and grew up in Strathcona County, before moving to attend Carleton University in Ottawa where he obtained a bachelor's degree in Public Affairs and Policy Management in February 2010. While studying at Carleton University, he wrote a regular column for the Sherwood Park News as a political correspondent. Genuis subsequently worked as an assistant to former Prime Minister Stephen Harper and adviser on the staff of former minister Rona Ambrose. Genuis obtained a master's degree in public policy from the London School of Economics in December 2011.

== Political career ==
Genuis ran in the 2012 Alberta general election as the Wildrose MLA candidate for Sherwood Park. He lost to Progressive Conservative candidate Cathy Olesen.

In March 2014, Genuis announced his intention to seek the Conservative nomination for the 2015 Canadian federal election in the newly formed riding of Sherwood Park—Fort Saskatchewan. He won the nomination in November 2014. Genuis won the federal election on October 19, 2015, capturing 64% of the votes in the riding, becoming its member of Parliament. The Conservative government of the day lost the election to the Liberals.

In November 2015, Genuis was appointed deputy critic for Human Rights and Religious Freedom. He served under head critic David Anderson.

In March 2016, Genuis was named one of the most outspoken MPs in the House of Commons by Maclean's Magazine. In November 2017, Genuis was named Maclean's Parliamentarian of the Year, based on a vote by members of the House of Commons. Genuis was the youngest recipient to date of the award.

In May 2019, Genuis supported Conservative leader Andrew Scheer's vision for a foreign policy where "Canada can play an important leadership role as part of a partnership of free democracies."

Genuis was re-elected to the 43rd Canadian Parliament on October 21, 2019, with 73.4% of the popular vote. His party, however, only won 121 of 338 seats, so he remained as part of the opposition. In 2019, he was given the role as Shadow Minister for Multiculturalism by then leader of the Conservative Party Andrew Scheer.

Genuis was a member of the House of Commons Special Committee on Canada-China Relations. He has voiced concerns over Huawei's influence on Canadian campuses. Genuis was against the appointment of Dominic Barton as Canada's ambassador to China, suggesting that Barton's past work advising more than 20 Chinese state-owned enterprises put him in a conflict of interest. In September 2020, Genuis was appointed as the shadow minister for international development and human rights by the Conservative Party of Canada's leader Erin O'Toole.

Genuis was re-elected to the 44th Canadian Parliament in the 2021 Canadian federal election with 57.5% of the popular vote in his constituency, despite experiencing a 16% decline in support compared to the 2019 general election. Following the election, Genuis was vocally supportive of Erin O'Toole's leadership of the party after the latter faced criticism for failing to increase the party's seat count from 2019.

Garnett Genuis was previously a committee member of the Canadian House of Commons Standing Committee on Foreign Affairs and International Development & the Canadian House of Commons Standing Committee on Citizenship and Immigration.

In September 2024, during question period, when Conservative Party leader Pierre Poilievre asked Prime Minister Justin Trudeau if he visited Consul General Tom Clark at the new residence when he was attending the United Nations General Assembly session, Genius replied to Trudeau's response by saying "Does he engage with them in the bathtub?". Trudeau argued that Genius's comment was homophobic, while Genius denied that he intended a sexual connotation. House Speaker Greg Fergus ruled that he took Genuis "at his word," and that Genuis' comment had no homophobic intent. Fergus nonetheless asked the MP to withdraw his comment because it "provoked disorder". Genuis went on to withdraw his comment "in deference to the authority of the chair".

He was re-elected in the 2025 Canadian federal electionwith 66.3% of the popular vote. After that, Genuis was appointed as the shadow minister for employment by the Conservative Party of Canada’s new leader Pierre Poilievre. Genuis is currently a committee member of the Canadian House of Commons Standing Committee on Human Resources, Skills and Social Development and the Status of Persons with Disabilities.

In February 2026, Garnett asked federal departments and agencies, as well as the military, if any of their employees are now, or have ever been, members of protest movements that stands in opposition to fascist and far-right ideologies. His question focused on the decentralized protest movement known as "antifa". Due to the tense political relations between the United States and Canada during this time as well as the controversial listing of antifa as a domestic terrorist organization by the Trump administration, Garnett Genuis's question can be interpreted as intent to seek out opposition to the Trump administration within Canadian institutions.

== Policies ==
=== Bystander awareness ===
On April 5, 2022 Genuis put forth motion M-57 to support the development of bystander awareness and intervention training to combat sexual harassment and violence, hate crimes & other forms of criminal activity.

=== Human rights advocacy ===
Genuis has been outspoken about various topics related to human rights in China. He has been a strong supporter of the Tibet cause. In January 2016, Genuis met with the Dalai Lama to discuss human rights and religious freedom.

In June 2022, Genuis, along with Senator Leo Housakos, hosted a press conference with Enes Kanter Freedom calling on the Canadian government to stop the importation of products made with forced labour coming from the Xinjiang Region.

Genuis supported Bill S-223, An Act to amend the Criminal Code and the Immigration and Refugee Protection Act (trafficking in human organs). This bill aims to protect people from the exploitative practices of organ harvesting.

In April 2022, Genuis introduced private member motion M-57. This called on the Canadian government to support bystander intervention training as a tool to combat sexual harassment and violence, hate crimes, and other forms of criminal activity.

Genuis jointly seconded the private member's bill C-281, known as the International Human Rights Act, sponsored by Philip Lawrence. This Bill contains several different important measures aimed at advancing international human rights, including changes to the Magnitsky Act, the Broadcasting Act, and the Prohibiting Cluster Munitions Act.

=== Democratic advocacy ===
Genuis spoke about democratic decline in Canada in the House of Commons, citing the International Institute for Democracy and Electoral Assistance in Stockholm.

=== Charities ===
Genuis has been a vocal advocate for Bill S-216 – An Act to amend the Income Tax Act (use of resources of a registered charity). S-216 also known as the Effective Charities Act, seeks to amend the Income Tax Act to ensure that charities can effectively collaborate with a wider range of charities (both domestic and international) including those without charitable status.

=== Energy security ===
Genuis has been an outspoken supporter of promoting energy security in the West using Canadian oil and gas, especially since the Russian invasion of Ukraine began.

=== Abortion ===
Genuis has been identified by the Campaign Life Coalition as having a perfect voting score for Life and family issues introduced to the House of Commons. Contributors to the Sherwood Park-Fort Saskatchewan Conservative Riding Association sponsored anti-abortion ads that appeared on buses in Vancouver, BC.

Genuis voted in support of Bill C-233 - An Act to amend the Criminal Code (sex-selective abortion), to combat sex-based discrimination, making it a criminal offence for a medical practitioner to knowingly perform an abortion sought solely on the grounds of the child's genetic sex.

=== Conversion therapy ===
On June 22, 2021, Genuis was one of 63 MPs to vote against Bill C-6, An Act to amend the Criminal Code (conversion therapy), which was passed by majority vote, making certain aspects of conversion therapy a crime, including "causing a child to undergo conversion therapy." Genuis stated he thinks banning conversion therapy is reasonable, but Bill C-6 was too broad in scope, and therefore did more than ban conversion therapy. Genuis consequently called on the Canadian government to fix the definition of "Conversion Therapy" in Bill C-6 by doing many things, one of which would be to ensure that no laws discriminate against Canadians by limiting what services they can receive based on their sexual orientation or gender identity.

=== Residential schooling ===
Genuis believes in the philosophical principle of the separation of church and state. This is partly why he voted against a request for papal apology for the Catholic Church's role in residential schools. The motion was put forward in reaction to the discovery of an alleged 215 unmarked graves of children at the former Kamloops Indian Residential School, and was a reiteration of the same motion tabled in May 2018.

== Personal life ==
Genuis is a Roman Catholic. He is married to Dr. Rebecca Genuis and together, they have six children. At the time of the 2025 Canadian federal election, he lived in Ardrossan, Alberta.

== Electoral record ==
=== Federal ===
2025 Canadian federal election: Sherwood Park—Fort Saskatchewan
Party	Candidate	Votes	%	±%	Expenditures
Conservative	Garnett Genuis	54,131	66.32	+8.77	$67,911.50
Liberal	Tanya Holm	22,178	27.17	+14.94	$27,327.98
New Democratic	Chris Jones	4,136	5.07	–15.57	$12,811.92
People's	Jay Sobel	497	0.61	–6.40	none listed
Green	Randall Emmons	448	0.55	–0.43	none listed
Canadian Future	Mark Horseman	237	0.29	–	$295.37
Total valid votes/expense limit		81,627	99.63	–	$148,372.54
Total rejected ballots		301	0.37	–0.05	
Turnout		81,928	77.98	+4.52	
Eligible voters		105,059			
Conservative notional hold		Swing		+12.17	
Source: Elections Canada

2021 Canadian federal election: Sherwood Park—Fort Saskatchewan
Party	Candidate	Votes	%	±%	Expenditures
Conservative	Garnett Genuis	41,092	57.55	–15.82	$54,552.91
New Democratic	Aidan Bradley Theroux	14,740	20.65	+8.51	$7,370.63
Liberal	Tanya Holm	8,730	12.23	+2.16	$23,831.90
People's	John Wetterstrand	5,004	7.01	+5.18	$8,937.40
Maverick	Todd Newberry	849	1.19	–	$5,182.19
Green	Sheldon Jonah Perris	700	0.98	–1.20	none listed
Independent	Charles Simpson	283	0.40	–	$7,678.37
Total valid votes/expense limit		71,398	99.58	–	$124,070.52
Total rejected ballots		298	0.42	–0.02	
Turnout		71,696	73.46	–2.83	
Eligible voters		97,600			
Conservative hold		Swing		–12.16	
Source: Elections Canada

2019 Canadian federal election: Sherwood Park—Fort Saskatchewan
Party	Candidate	Votes	%	±%	Expenditures
Conservative	Garnett Genuis	53,600	73.37	+9.43	$56,462.67
New Democratic	Aidan Bradley Theroux	8,867	12.14	+2.33	$8,662.98
Liberal	Ron Thiering	7,357	10.07	–10.35	$9,484.96
Green	Laura Elizabeth Sanderson	1,592	2.18	–0.29	none listed
People's	Darren Villetard	1,334	1.83	–	$1,638.00
Veterans Coalition	Patrick McElrea	300	0.41	–	none listed
Total valid votes/expense limit		73,050	99.56	–	$119,505.94
Total rejected ballots		321	0.44	+0.17	
Turnout		73,371	76.29	+2.23	
Eligible voters		96,171			
Conservative hold		Swing		+3.55	
Source: Elections Canada

2015 Canadian federal election: Sherwood Park—Fort Saskatchewan
Party	Candidate	Votes	%	±%	Expenditures
Conservative	Garnett Genuis	42,642	63.94	+14.48	$137,300.11
Liberal	Rod Frank	13,615	20.42	+13.95	$23,559.35
New Democratic	Joanne Cave	6,540	9.81	–1.42	$15,414.43
Green	Brandie Harrop	1,648	2.47	–1.59	$3,796.57
Independent	James Ford	1,563	2.34	–26.44	$5,420.41
Libertarian	Stephen C. Burry	678	1.02	–	$2,387.73
Total valid votes/expense limit		66,686	99.73	–	$228,934.10
Total rejected ballots		180	0.27	–	
Turnout		66,866	74.06	–	
Eligible voters		90,289			
Conservative hold		Swing		+0.27	
Source: Elections Canada

=== Provincial ===
2012 Alberta general election: Sherwood Park
Party	Candidate	Votes	%	±%
Progressive Conservative	Cathy Olesen	8,747	45.62	−17.52
Wildrose	Garnett Genuis	5,948	31.02	
Liberal	Dave Anderson	1,837	9.58	−16.48
New Democratic	Sarah Michelin	1,210	6.31	+0.18
Independent	James Ford	1,064	5.55	
Alberta Party	Chris Kuchmak	230	1.20	
Social Credit	Gordon Barrett	137	0.71	
Total valid votes		19,173		
Rejected, spoiled, and declined		184		
Registered electors / turnout		30,851	62.74	+15.06
Progressive Conservative hold		Swing		−24.27
Source(s) Elections Alberta. "Electoral Division Results: Sherwood Park".
