= Bruce Collingwood =

Canadian politician (1953–2017)

Member of the Legislative Assembly of Alberta for Sherwood Park
- In office 1993–1997
- Preceded by: Peter Elzinga
- Succeeded by: Iris Evans

Personal details
- Born: May 16, 1953 Edmonton, Alberta
- Died: August 28, 2017 (aged 64) Victoria, British Columbia
- Party: Alberta Liberal Party
- Spouse: Janis
- Occupation: lawyer

Bruce John Collingwood (May 16, 1953 – August 28, 2017) was a provincial-level politician from Alberta, Canada. He served as a member of the Legislative Assembly of Alberta from 1993 to 1997.

== Political career ==
Collingwood was elected to the Alberta Legislature in the 1993 Alberta general election. He won the electoral district of Sherwood Park picking it up for the Liberals. He ran for a second term in office in the 1997 Alberta general election but was defeated by Progressive Conservative candidate Iris Evans. After his political career, Collingwood practised law in Victoria, British Columbia until his death at the age of 64 in 2017.
