= Jordan Walker (politician) =

Canadian politician

Member of the Legislative Assembly of Alberta for Sherwood Park
- In office April 16, 2019 – May 29, 2023
- Preceded by: Annie McKitrick
- Succeeded by: Kyle Kasawski

Personal details
- Born: 1982 or 1983 (age 43–44)
- Party: United Conservative Party

Jordan Walker is a Canadian politician who was elected in the 2019 Alberta general election to the Legislative Assembly of Alberta representing the electoral district of Sherwood Park. He is a member of the United Conservative Party

He was the 951st Member to be sworn into the Legislative Assembly of Alberta.

== Background ==
Prior to his election as a Member of the Legislative Assembly of Alberta, Mr. Walker served as an education assessor for the Government of Alberta. He speaks basic Japanese and formerly spent a year teaching English as a second language in Japan. He holds both a master’s degree a bachelors degree.

Mr. Walker and his wife Shizuko are residents of Sherwood Park.

He is originally from Montague, Prince Edward Island and attended UPEI.

== Political Activity ==
Mr. Walker has served as a member of the Treasury Board, Alberta First Cabinet Policy Committee, and the Standing Committee on Alberta’s Economic Future. In addition to this service, Walker has been a member of the Standing Committee on Families and Communities, the Special Standing Committee on Members’ Services, the Standing Committee on Legislative Offices as well as the Standing Committee on Public Accounts among others. Mr. Walker also previously served as Chair of the Select Special Information and Privacy Commissioner Search Committee.

Mr. Walker has carried on his interest in Japan by speaking to the importance of Japanese-Albertan relations in the legislature.

As a legislator and member of the treasury board Walker has advocated for capital investment in Sherwood Park, particularly at the local hospital and schools.

== Electoral history ==
=== 2023 general election ===
2023 Alberta general election: Sherwood Park
Party	Candidate	Votes	%	±%
New Democratic	Kyle Kasawski	13,108	50.27	+10.27
United Conservative	Jordan Walker	11,447	43.90	-1.47
Alberta Party	Sue Timanson	1,293	4.96	-8.18
Liberal	Jacob Stacey	225	0.86	–
Total		26,073	–	
Rejected and declined		128	0.63	
Turnout		26,201	70.32	
Eligible voters		37,259		
New Democratic gain from United Conservative		Swing		+5.87
Source(s) Source: Elections Alberta

=== 2019 general election ===
2019 Alberta general election: Sherwood Park
Party	Candidate	Votes	%	±%
United Conservative	Jordan Walker	12,119	45.37	-2.96
New Democratic	Annie McKitrick	10,685	40.00	-11.65
Alberta Party	Sue Timanson	3,509	13.14	+13.12
Alberta Independence	Brian Ilkuf	216	0.81	–
Alberta Advantage Party	Chris Glassford	183	0.69	–
Total		26,712	99.34	–
Rejected, spoiled and declined		178	0.66	
Turnout		26,890	76.69	
Eligible voters		35,061		
United Conservative notional gain from New Democratic		Swing		+4.35
Source(s) Source: "81 - Sherwood Park, 2019 Alberta general election". officialresults.elections.ab.ca. Elections Alberta. Alberta. Chief Electoral Officer (2019). 2019 General Election. A Report of the Chief Electoral Officer. Volume II (PDF) (Report). Vol. 2. Edmonton, Alta.: Elections Alberta. pp. 394–398. ISBN 978-1-988620-12-1.
