= 2026 ATB Okotoks Classic =

- Host city: Okotoks, Alberta
- Arena: Okotoks Curling Club
- Dates: September 24–27
- Winner: (Manitoba) Team Dunstone
- Curling club: Granite CC, Winnipeg
- Skip: Matt Dunstone
- Third: Colton Lott
- Second: Mark Nichols
- Lead: Ryan Harnden
- Finalist: (Switzerland) Marco Hösli

The 2026 ATB Okotoks Classic was held from September 24 to 27 at the Okotoks Curling Club in Okotoks, Alberta. The event was held in a triple-knockout format with a purse of $42,000.

For the 2026–27 season, the event was a satellite Grand Slam of Curling event. The highest ranking non-qualified team earned a spot at the 2026 GSOC Masters, the second Grand Slam of the season. As both finalists were already qualified for the event, the spot went to Manitoba's Jordon McDonald as the only semifinalist not yet qualified.

== Teams ==
The teams are listed as follows:

Skip	Third	Second	Lead	Alternate	Locale
James Ballance	Michael Keenan	Garrett Johnston	Steven Leong		Okotoks, Alberta
Cameron de Jong (Fourth)	Matthew Blandford (Skip)	Sébastien Robillard	Cody Johnston		Vancouver, British Columbia
Brendan Bottcher	Jake Horgan	Tanner Horgan	Geoff Walker		Edmonton, Alberta
Cameron Bryce	Kerr Drummond	Scott Hyslop	Robin McCall		Kelso, Scotland
Carl deConinck Smith	Ryan Deis	Dustin Mikush	Kalin Deis		Fox Valley, Saskatchewan
Matt Dunstone	Colton Lott	Mark Nichols	Ryan Harnden		Winnipeg, Manitoba
Go Aoki (Fourth)	Shingo Usui	Takeshi Aoyanagi	Kohsuke Hirata (Skip)	Ryota Meguro	Kitami, Japan
Philipp Hösli (Fourth)	Marco Hösli (Skip)	Simon Gloor	Justin Hausherr		Glarus, Switzerland
Daniel Humbke	Andrew Jones	Michael Dahms	Ty Parcels		Lacombe, Alberta
Cole Adams (Fourth)	Ryan Jacques (Skip)	Andrew Nowell	Adam Naugler		Edmonton, Alberta
Benjamin Kapp	Felix Messenzehl	Johannes Scheuerl	Mario Trevisiol		Füssen, Germany
Kevin Koe	Johnson Tao	Aaron Sluchinski	Karrick Martin		Calgary, Alberta
Jacob Libbus	Nathan Molberg	Zachary Pawliuk	Michael Hendricks		Edmonton, Alberta
Liu Guangshen (Note: Liu Guangshen skipped Team Ma. Second Zhu Yupeng moved to third and alternate Yu Sen moved to second.)	Zhu Yupeng	Yu Sen	Yu Feng		Chengdu, China
Takumi Maeda	Hiroki Maeda	Uryu Kamikawa	Gakuto Tokoro	Ryotaro Shukuya	Tokoro, Japan
Jordon McDonald	Jacques Gauthier	Elias Huminicki	Cameron Olafson		Winnipeg, Manitoba
Mike McEwen	Rylan Kleiter	Joshua Mattern	Trevor Johnson		Saskatoon, Saskatchewan
Darren Moulding	Kyler Kleibrink	Andrew Nerpin	Evan Crough	Brent Pierce (Note: Brent Pierce spared at lead for Team Moulding's first three games.)	Red Deer, Alberta
Ryan Parent	Ben Savage	Derek Bowyer	Jared Jenkins		Calgary, Alberta
Jeong Yeong-seok (Note: Jeong Yeong-seok skipped Team Park.)	Park Jong-duk	Lee Ki-bok	Oh Seung-hoon	Seong Ji-hoon	Gangwon, South Korea
John Shuster	Andrew Stopera	Mark Fenner	Caden Hebert (Note: Caden Hebert spared for Lance Wheeler.)		(United States) Duluth, Minnesota
Tyler Tardi	Colton Flasch	Kevin Marsh	Daniel Marsh		Saskatoon, Saskatchewan
Evan van Amsterdam	Jeremy Harty	Jason Ginter	Parker Konschuh		Edmonton, Alberta
Kenan Wipf	Ky Macaulay	Ethan Drysdale	Spenser Else		Calgary, Alberta
Mattia Giovanella (Fourth)	Alberto Zisa (Skip)	Francesco De Zanna	Francesco Vigliani		Trentino, Italy

== Knockout Brackets ==
=== A Event ===
First Knockout	Qualifier 1
(Manitoba) Matt Dunstone	7
(Saskatchewan) Carl deConinck Smith	2	(Alberta) Jacob Libbus	2
(Alberta) Jacob Libbus	6	(Manitoba) Matt Dunstone	4
(Japan) Takumi Maeda	10	(Alberta) Kevin Koe	7
(Alberta) James Ballance	4	(Japan) Takumi Maeda	4
(Alberta) Daniel Humbke	3	(Alberta) Kevin Koe	5
(Alberta) Kevin Koe	7	(Alberta) Kevin Koe	6
(Saskatchewan) Tyler Tardi	2
(Saskatchewan) Tyler Tardi	7
(Scotland) Cameron Bryce	9	(Scotland) Cameron Bryce	3
(Alberta) Kenan Wipf	2	(Saskatchewan) Tyler Tardi	8
(China) Team Ma	5	(Manitoba) Jordon McDonald	5
(Alberta) Ryan Parent	7	(Alberta) Ryan Parent	3
(Manitoba) Jordon McDonald	7

First Knockout	Qualifier 2
(Alberta) Brendan Bottcher	7
(South Korea) Team Park	4	(South Korea) Team Park	5
(Italy) Alberto Zisa	1	(Alberta) Brendan Bottcher	6
(Saskatchewan) Mike McEwen	5	(Alberta) Evan van Amsterdam	3
(Japan) Kohsuke Hirata	4	(Saskatchewan) Mike McEwen	4
(Alberta) Evan van Amsterdam	5
(Alberta) Brendan Bottcher	6
(Switzerland) Marco Hösli	5
(Germany) Benjamin Kapp	7
(Alberta) Darren Moulding	4	(United States) John Shuster	5
(United States) John Shuster	5	(Germany) Benjamin Kapp	2
(British Columbia) Matthew Blandford	5	(Switzerland) Marco Hösli	9
(Alberta) Ryan Jacques	4	(British Columbia) Matthew Blandford	2
(Switzerland) Marco Hösli	7

=== B Event ===
Second Knockout	Qualifier 3
(Saskatchewan) Tyler Tardi	3
(Saskatchewan) Mike McEwen	4
(South Korea) Team Park	5
(Saskatchewan) Mike McEwen	6
(Saskatchewan) Mike McEwen	7
(British Columbia) Matthew Blandford	3
(United States) John Shuster	5
(British Columbia) Matthew Blandford	7
(Saskatchewan) Mike McEwen	5
(Alberta) Evan van Amsterdam	3
(Alberta) Evan van Amsterdam	6
(China) Team Ma	4
(Alberta) Kenan Wipf	2
(China) Team Ma	8
(Alberta) Evan van Amsterdam	7
(Germany) Benjamin Kapp	2
(Germany) Benjamin Kapp	7
(Saskatchewan) Carl deConinck Smith	3
(Saskatchewan) Carl deConinck Smith	6
(Alberta) James Ballance	3	(Alberta) Daniel Humbke	5
(Alberta) Daniel Humbke	6

Second Knockout	Qualifier 4
(Switzerland) Marco Hösli	8
(Alberta) Jacob Libbus	3	(Scotland) Cameron Bryce	1
(Japan) Takumi Maeda	6	(Japan) Takumi Maeda	3
(Scotland) Cameron Bryce	10	(Scotland) Cameron Bryce	6
(Alberta) Ryan Parent	7	(Switzerland) Marco Hösli	4
(Manitoba) Matt Dunstone	7
(Manitoba) Matt Dunstone	7
(Alberta) Darren Moulding	8	(Alberta) Darren Moulding	1
(Alberta) Ryan Jacques	6	(Manitoba) Matt Dunstone	5
(Manitoba) Jordon McDonald	4
(Manitoba) Jordon McDonald	6
(Italy) Alberto Zisa	6	(Italy) Alberto Zisa	2
(Japan) Kohsuke Hirata	3

=== C Event ===
Third Knockout	Qualifier 5
(Alberta) James Ballance	5
(Switzerland) Marco Hösli	5
(South Korea) Team Park	4
(Alberta) James Ballance	0	(United States) John Shuster	4
(United States) John Shuster	7
(United States) John Shuster	7
(Alberta) Kenan Wipf	3

Third Knockout	Qualifier 6
(Alberta) Jacob Libbus	6
(Alberta) Evan van Amsterdam	6
(Japan) Kohsuke Hirata	5
(Alberta) Jacob Libbus	6	(Alberta) Ryan Parent	3
(Alberta) Ryan Parent	7
(Alberta) Ryan Parent	7
(Alberta) Ryan Jacques	5

Third Knockout	Qualifier 7
(Manitoba) Jordon McDonald	9
(China) Team Ma	3
(British Columbia) Matthew Blandford	4
(China) Team Ma	9
(Manitoba) Jordon McDonald	5
(Scotland) Cameron Bryce	4
(Saskatchewan) Carl deConinck Smith	4
(Scotland) Cameron Bryce	5

Third Knockout	Qualifier 8
(Germany) Benjamin Kapp	7
(Japan) Takumi Maeda	3
(Japan) Takumi Maeda	9
(Alberta) Darren Moulding	3
(Germany) Benjamin Kapp	5
(Italy) Alberto Zisa	4
(Italy) Alberto Zisa	8
(Alberta) Daniel Humbke	1
(Italy) Alberto Zisa	6
(Saskatchewan) Tyler Tardi	5

== Knockout Results ==
All draw times listed in Mountain Daylight Time (UTC-06:00).

=== Draw 1 ===
Thursday, September 24, 9:00 am

Sheet 1	1	2	3	4	5	6	7	8	Final
(Saskatchewan) Carl deConinck Smith	0	0	1	0	1	0	0	X	2
(Alberta) Jacob Libbus 🔨	0	1	0	3	0	1	1	X	6

Sheet 2	1	2	3	4	5	6	7	8	Final
(Alberta) Daniel Humbke	0	0	0	1	0	2	X	X	3
(Alberta) Kevin Koe 🔨	3	1	1	0	2	0	X	X	7

Sheet 3	1	2	3	4	5	6	7	8	Final
(Saskatchewan) Mike McEwen	0	1	0	3	0	1	0	X	5
(Japan) Kohsuke Hirata 🔨	0	0	1	0	2	0	1	X	4

Sheet 5	1	2	3	4	5	6	7	8	Final
(South Korea) Team Park	0	1	0	0	0	0	2	1	4
(Italy) Alberto Zisa 🔨	0	0	0	1	0	0	0	0	1

Sheet 6	1	2	3	4	5	6	7	8	Final
(Japan) Takumi Maeda	3	0	0	2	1	0	4	X	10
(Alberta) James Ballance 🔨	0	1	1	0	0	2	0	X	4

=== Draw 2 ===
Thursday, September 24, 1:15 pm

Sheet 1	1	2	3	4	5	6	7	8	Final
(Scotland) Cameron Bryce 🔨	4	0	1	0	2	2	X	X	9
(Alberta) Kenan Wipf	0	1	0	1	0	0	X	X	2

Sheet 2	1	2	3	4	5	6	7	8	Final
(China) Team Ma	0	2	0	1	1	1	0	0	5
(Alberta) Ryan Parent 🔨	0	0	3	0	0	0	1	3	7

Sheet 3	1	2	3	4	5	6	7	8	Final
(Japan) Takumi Maeda	0	0	1	0	2	0	1	X	4
(Alberta) Kevin Koe 🔨	0	1	0	2	0	2	0	X	5

Sheet 4	1	2	3	4	5	6	7	8	Final
(Alberta) Darren Moulding 🔨	0	1	1	1	0	1	0	0	4
(United States) John Shuster	1	0	0	0	1	0	2	1	5

Sheet 5	1	2	3	4	5	6	7	8	Final
(British Columbia) Matthew Blandford 🔨	0	1	0	1	0	0	2	1	5
(Alberta) Ryan Jacques	0	0	2	0	1	1	0	0	4

Sheet 6	1	2	3	4	5	6	7	8	Final
(Saskatchewan) Mike McEwen 🔨	0	0	1	0	1	0	1	1	4
(Alberta) Evan van Amsterdam	0	1	0	4	0	0	0	0	5

=== Draw 3 ===
Thursday, September 24, 5:30 pm

Sheet 1	1	2	3	4	5	6	7	8	9	Final
(Alberta) Brendan Bottcher 🔨	1	0	3	0	0	1	0	0	2	7
(South Korea) Team Park	0	3	0	0	1	0	0	1	0	5

Sheet 2	1	2	3	4	5	6	7	8	Final
(Germany) Benjamin Kapp 🔨	1	0	2	0	1	0	2	1	7
(United States) John Shuster	0	1	0	2	0	2	0	0	5

Sheet 3	1	2	3	4	5	6	7	8	Final
(British Columbia) Matthew Blandford	0	1	0	0	0	1	0	X	2
(Switzerland) Marco Hösli 🔨	3	0	0	1	1	0	2	X	7

Sheet 4	1	2	3	4	5	6	7	8	Final
(Manitoba) Matt Dunstone 🔨	0	1	0	3	0	1	2	X	7
(Alberta) Jacob Libbus	1	0	1	0	0	0	0	X	2

Sheet 5	1	2	3	4	5	6	7	8	Final
(Saskatchewan) Tyler Tardi	0	2	1	0	0	0	2	2	7
(Scotland) Cameron Bryce 🔨	2	0	0	1	0	0	0	0	3

Sheet 6	1	2	3	4	5	6	7	8	Final
(Alberta) Ryan Parent	0	2	0	0	1	X	X	X	3
(Manitoba) Jordon McDonald 🔨	3	0	0	4	0	X	X	X	7

=== Draw 4 ===
Friday, September 25, 9:00 am

Sheet 1	1	2	3	4	5	6	7	8	Final
(Germany) Benjamin Kapp 🔨	0	1	0	1	0	0	X	X	2
(Switzerland) Marco Hösli	0	0	3	0	1	5	X	X	9

Sheet 2	1	2	3	4	5	6	7	8	Final
(Alberta) Brendan Bottcher 🔨	0	2	0	1	0	2	1	X	6
(Alberta) Evan van Amsterdam	0	0	2	0	1	0	0	X	3

Sheet 3	1	2	3	4	5	6	7	8	Final
(Saskatchewan) Tyler Tardi 🔨	0	1	0	2	0	3	0	2	8
(Manitoba) Jordon McDonald	1	0	2	0	1	0	1	0	5

Sheet 5	1	2	3	4	5	6	7	8	Final
(Alberta) James Ballance 🔨	0	0	2	0	0	1	0	X	3
(Alberta) Daniel Humbke	1	0	0	1	1	0	3	X	6

Sheet 6	1	2	3	4	5	6	7	8	Final
(Manitoba) Matt Dunstone	0	0	2	0	0	2	0	0	4
(Alberta) Kevin Koe 🔨	1	1	0	2	1	0	1	1	7

=== Draw 5 ===
Friday, September 25, 12:45 pm

Sheet 1	1	2	3	4	5	6	7	8	Final
(United States) John Shuster	0	0	1	2	1	0	0	1	5
(British Columbia) Matthew Blandford 🔨	3	1	0	0	0	2	1	0	7

Sheet 2	1	2	3	4	5	6	7	8	Final
(South Korea) Team Park	1	2	0	1	0	0	0	1	5
(Saskatchewan) Mike McEwen 🔨	0	0	3	0	0	2	1	0	6

Sheet 3	1	2	3	4	5	6	7	8	Final
(Alberta) Kenan Wipf	0	0	0	2	0	X	X	X	2
(China) Team Ma 🔨	4	2	1	0	1	X	X	X	8

Sheet 4	1	2	3	4	5	6	7	8	Final
(Scotland) Cameron Bryce	0	1	0	2	0	3	0	4	10
(Alberta) Ryan Parent 🔨	1	0	3	0	2	0	1	0	7

Sheet 5	1	2	3	4	5	6	7	8	Final
(Alberta) Jacob Libbus	0	1	1	0	0	1	0	X	3
(Japan) Takumi Maeda 🔨	1	0	0	2	0	0	3	X	6

Sheet 6	1	2	3	4	5	6	7	8	9	Final
(Alberta) Darren Moulding	0	1	2	0	1	0	2	0	2	8
(Alberta) Ryan Jacques 🔨	2	0	0	1	0	1	0	2	0	6

=== Draw 6 ===
Friday, September 25, 4:30 pm

Sheet 1	1	2	3	4	5	6	7	8	Final
(Japan) Takumi Maeda	0	0	1	0	0	2	0	0	3
(Scotland) Cameron Bryce 🔨	1	2	0	0	1	0	0	2	6

Sheet 2	1	2	3	4	5	6	7	8	Final
(Alberta) Kevin Koe 🔨	0	0	1	2	0	0	1	2	6
(Saskatchewan) Tyler Tardi	1	1	0	0	0	0	0	0	2

Sheet 3	1	2	3	4	5	6	7	8	Final
(Saskatchewan) Carl deConinck Smith	0	0	2	0	3	1	0	0	6
(Alberta) Daniel Humbke 🔨	0	1	0	1	0	0	2	1	5

Sheet 4	1	2	3	4	5	6	7	8	Final
(Saskatchewan) Mike McEwen 🔨	0	1	0	4	1	0	1	X	7
(British Columbia) Matthew Blandford	0	0	2	0	0	1	0	X	3

Sheet 5	1	2	3	4	5	6	7	8	9	Final
(Alberta) Brendan Bottcher	0	2	0	0	1	0	2	0	1	6
(Switzerland) Marco Hösli 🔨	2	0	0	1	0	1	0	1	0	5

Sheet 6	1	2	3	4	5	6	7	8	Final
(Italy) Alberto Zisa 🔨	1	0	1	0	2	0	2	X	6
(Japan) Kohsuke Hirata	0	2	0	0	0	1	0	X	3

=== Draw 7 ===
Friday, September 25, 8:15 pm

Sheet 1	1	2	3	4	5	6	7	8	Final
(Alberta) James Ballance 🔨	0	0	1	0	2	1	0	1	5
(South Korea) Team Park	1	0	0	2	0	0	1	0	4

Sheet 2	1	2	3	4	5	6	7	8	9	Final
(Alberta) Jacob Libbus	0	0	0	1	0	3	1	0	1	6
(Japan) Kohsuke Hirata 🔨	0	0	3	0	1	0	0	1	0	5

Sheet 3	1	2	3	4	5	6	7	8	Final
(Manitoba) Matt Dunstone 🔨	4	0	3	X	X	X	X	X	7
(Alberta) Darren Moulding	0	1	0	X	X	X	X	X	1

Sheet 4	1	2	3	4	5	6	7	8	Final
(Germany) Benjamin Kapp 🔨	0	0	4	1	0	2	X	X	7
(Saskatchewan) Carl deConinck Smith	1	1	0	0	1	0	X	X	3

Sheet 5	1	2	3	4	5	6	7	8	Final
(Manitoba) Jordon McDonald 🔨	1	0	0	2	0	0	3	X	6
(Italy) Alberto Zisa	0	0	1	0	0	1	0	X	2

Sheet 6	1	2	3	4	5	6	7	8	9	Final
(Alberta) Evan van Amsterdam	0	1	0	0	1	1	1	0	2	6
(China) Team Ma 🔨	2	0	1	0	0	0	0	1	0	4

=== Draw 8 ===
Saturday, September 26, 9:00 am

Sheet 1	1	2	3	4	5	6	7	8	Final
(Alberta) Ryan Parent 🔨	1	0	0	2	0	0	2	2	7
(Alberta) Ryan Jacques	0	1	2	0	1	1	0	0	5

Sheet 2	1	2	3	4	5	6	7	8	Final
(Alberta) Evan van Amsterdam 🔨	2	2	0	3	0	X	X	X	7
(Germany) Benjamin Kapp	0	0	1	0	1	X	X	X	2

Sheet 3	1	2	3	4	5	6	7	8	Final
(Saskatchewan) Tyler Tardi 🔨	0	0	2	0	0	0	1	0	3
(Saskatchewan) Mike McEwen	1	0	0	1	0	1	0	1	4

Sheet 4	1	2	3	4	5	6	7	8	Final
(Manitoba) Matt Dunstone 🔨	0	1	0	1	0	3	0	0	5
(Manitoba) Jordon McDonald	0	0	1	0	1	0	1	1	4

Sheet 5	1	2	3	4	5	6	7	8	Final
(Switzerland) Marco Hösli 🔨	2	0	2	1	3	X	X	X	8
(Scotland) Cameron Bryce	0	1	0	0	0	X	X	X	1

Sheet 6	1	2	3	4	5	6	7	8	Final
(United States) John Shuster 🔨	0	0	2	1	0	3	1	X	7
(Alberta) Kenan Wipf	0	1	0	0	2	0	0	X	3

=== Draw 9 ===
Saturday, September 26, 12:45 pm

Sheet 1	1	2	3	4	5	6	7	8	Final
(Italy) Alberto Zisa 🔨	2	3	0	3	X	X	X	X	8
(Alberta) Daniel Humbke	0	0	1	0	X	X	X	X	1

Sheet 2	1	2	3	4	5	6	7	8	Final
(Japan) Takumi Maeda 🔨	5	1	0	0	3	X	X	X	9
(Alberta) Darren Moulding	0	0	0	3	0	X	X	X	3

Sheet 3	1	2	3	4	5	6	7	8	Final
(Switzerland) Marco Hösli 🔨	1	0	0	1	0	2	0	0	4
(Manitoba) Matt Dunstone	0	0	2	0	1	0	2	2	7

Sheet 4	1	2	3	4	5	6	7	8	Final
(Saskatchewan) Mike McEwen 🔨	0	2	0	0	0	3	0	X	5
(Alberta) Evan van Amsterdam	0	0	1	0	0	0	2	X	3

Sheet 5	1	2	3	4	5	6	7	8	Final
(British Columbia) Matthew Blandford	0	1	0	0	2	1	0	0	4
(China) Team Ma 🔨	3	0	1	1	0	0	2	2	9

=== Draw 10 ===
Saturday, September 26, 4:30 pm

Sheet 1	1	2	3	4	5	6	7	8	Final
(Saskatchewan) Carl deConinck Smith	0	1	1	0	0	2	0	0	4
(Scotland) Cameron Bryce 🔨	2	0	0	1	0	0	0	2	5

Sheet 2	1	2	3	4	5	6	7	8	Final
(Alberta) James Ballance	0	0	0	0	X	X	X	X	0
(United States) John Shuster 🔨	0	4	2	1	X	X	X	X	7

Sheet 3	1	2	3	4	5	6	7	8	Final
(Manitoba) Jordon McDonald 🔨	0	1	0	4	0	4	X	X	9
(China) Team Ma	1	0	1	0	1	0	X	X	3

Sheet 4	1	2	3	4	5	6	7	8	Final
(Italy) Alberto Zisa	0	2	0	0	2	0	2	0	6
(Saskatchewan) Tyler Tardi 🔨	2	0	0	1	0	1	0	1	5

Sheet 5	1	2	3	4	5	6	7	8	Final
(Alberta) Jacob Libbus 🔨	2	0	0	2	0	1	0	1	6
(Alberta) Ryan Parent	0	1	3	0	1	0	2	0	7

Sheet 6	1	2	3	4	5	6	7	8	Final
(Germany) Benjamin Kapp 🔨	0	1	0	2	1	0	3	X	7
(Japan) Takumi Maeda	0	0	1	0	0	1	0	X	3

=== Draw 11 ===
Saturday, September 26, 8:15 pm

Sheet 1	1	2	3	4	5	6	7	8	Final
(Switzerland) Marco Hösli 🔨	1	0	2	0	0	1	0	1	5
(United States) John Shuster	0	1	0	0	2	0	1	0	4

Sheet 2	1	2	3	4	5	6	7	8	9	Final
(Manitoba) Jordon McDonald	0	2	0	0	2	0	0	0	1	5
(Scotland) Cameron Bryce 🔨	1	0	0	1	0	1	0	1	0	4

Sheet 3	1	2	3	4	5	6	7	8	Final
(Alberta) Evan van Amsterdam 🔨	1	1	0	1	1	0	2	X	6
(Alberta) Ryan Parent	0	0	2	0	0	1	0	X	3

Sheet 5	1	2	3	4	5	6	7	8	Final
(Germany) Benjamin Kapp	0	0	2	0	0	2	0	1	5
(Italy) Alberto Zisa 🔨	1	0	0	0	1	0	2	0	4

== Playoffs ==
Quarterfinals
A2	(Alberta) Brendan Bottcher	6
C4	(Germany) Benjamin Kapp	2
C1	(Switzerland) Marco Hösli	8
B1	(Saskatchewan) Mike McEwen	5
B2	(Manitoba) Matt Dunstone	8
C2	(Alberta) Evan van Amsterdam	3
C3	(Manitoba) Jordon McDonald	8
A1	(Alberta) Kevin Koe	4

Semifinals
A2	(Alberta) Brendan Bottcher	5
C1	(Switzerland) Marco Hösli	7
B2	(Manitoba) Matt Dunstone	7
C3	(Manitoba) Jordon McDonald	3

Final
C1	(Switzerland) Marco Hösli	4
B2	(Manitoba) Matt Dunstone	5

=== Quarterfinals ===
Sunday, September 27, 8:45 am

Sheet 1	1	2	3	4	5	6	7	8	Final
(Alberta) Brendan Bottcher 🔨	2	0	0	3	1	0	X	X	6
(Germany) Benjamin Kapp	0	0	1	0	0	1	X	X	2

Sheet 2	1	2	3	4	5	6	7	8	Final
(Manitoba) Matt Dunstone 🔨	2	0	3	0	3	X	X	X	8
(Alberta) Evan van Amsterdam	0	2	0	1	0	X	X	X	3

Sheet 3	1	2	3	4	5	6	7	8	Final
(Manitoba) Jordon McDonald	0	0	0	2	3	1	2	X	8
(Alberta) Kevin Koe 🔨	2	1	1	0	0	0	0	X	4

Sheet 5	1	2	3	4	5	6	7	8	Final
(Switzerland) Marco Hösli	0	2	0	2	2	1	0	1	8
(Saskatchewan) Mike McEwen 🔨	3	0	1	0	0	0	1	0	5

=== Semifinals ===
Sunday, September 27, 12:00 pm

Sheet 1	1	2	3	4	5	6	7	8	Final
(Manitoba) Matt Dunstone 🔨	1	0	0	3	0	0	3	X	7
(Manitoba) Jordon McDonald	0	1	1	0	1	0	0	X	3

Sheet 3	1	2	3	4	5	6	7	8	9	Final
(Alberta) Brendan Bottcher 🔨	2	0	0	1	0	1	1	0	0	5
(Switzerland) Marco Hösli	0	2	1	0	1	0	0	1	2	7

=== Final ===
Sunday, September 27, 3:00 pm

Sheet 3	1	2	3	4	5	6	7	8	9	Final
(Switzerland) Marco Hösli	0	0	1	0	1	0	0	2	0	4
(Manitoba) Matt Dunstone 🔨	0	2	0	0	0	0	2	0	1	5
