= 2010 Strathcona County municipal election =

Municipal election in Alberta, Canada

← 2007	October 18, 2010	2013 →

Mayor and 8 councilors to Strathcona County Council
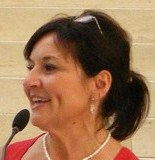

Candidate	Linda Osinchuk	Cathy Olesen
Last election	Ran as councillor	8,056
Popular vote	13,299	10,115
Percentage	56.8%	43.2%
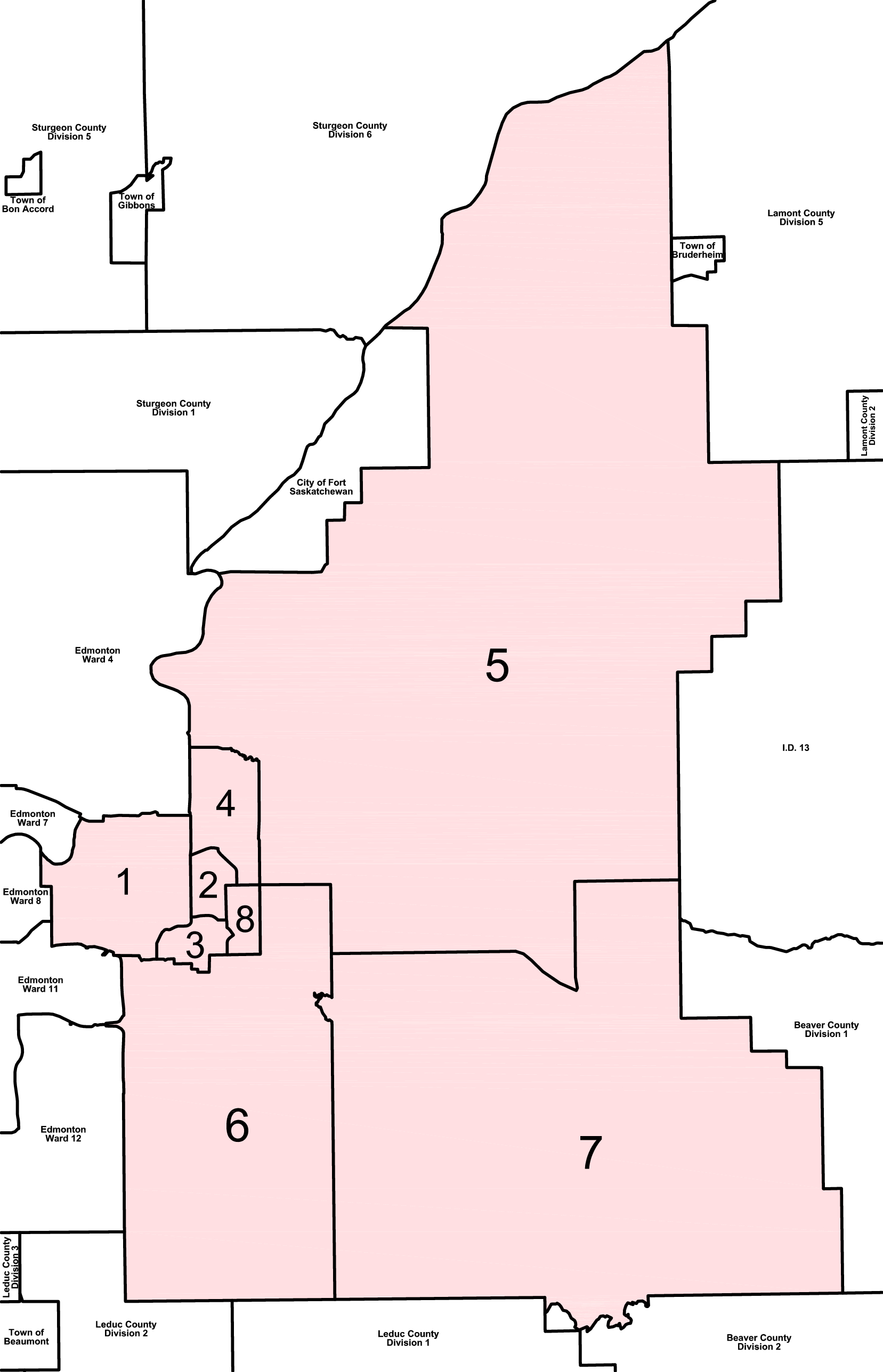
- Strathcona County and surrounding wards
Mayor before election
Cathy Olesen
Elected mayor
Linda Osinchuk

The 2010 Strathcona County municipal election was held Monday, October 18, 2010. Since 1968, provincial legislation has required every municipality to hold triennial elections. The citizens of Strathcona County, (this includes the Urban Service Area of Sherwood Park,) Alberta, elected one mayor, five of their eight councillors (one from each of eight wards), four of the Elk Island Public Schools Regional Division No. 14's nine trustees (3 from subdivision #2, and 1 from subdivision #3), and four of the Elk Island Catholic Separate Regional Division No. 41's seven trustees (supporters in Sherwood Park). Three incumbent councillors had no challengers, and the candidate for public school trustee Strathcona County south had no challengers.

== Results ==
Bold indicates elected, and incumbents are italicized.

=== Mayor ===
Mayor
Candidate	Votes	%
**Linda Osinchuk**	**13,299**	**56.8**
Cathy Olesen	10,115	43.2

=== Councillors ===
Councillors
Ward 1			Ward 2			Ward 3		
Candidate	Votes	%	Candidate	Votes	%	Candidate	Votes	%
**Vic Bidzinski**	**2,540**	**67.2**	**Roxanne Carr**	**Acclaimed**		**Brian Botterill**	**1,849**	**51.6**
Murray Hutchinson	1,237	32.8				Keith Paterson	1,532	42.7
Ward 4			Ward 5			Neal Sarnecki	205	5.7
**Peter Wlodarczak**	**Acclaimed**		**Jacquie Fenske**	**Acclaimed**				
Ward 6			Ward 7			Ward 8		
**Linton Delainey**	**1,307**	**49.7**	**Bonnie Riddell**	**915**	**43.8**	**Jason Gariepy**	**2,412**	**64.0**
Alan Dunn	982	37.4	Don McPherson	826	39.5	Dave Cherniawsky	1,356	36.0
Sharon Bishop	340	12.9	Colin Bonneau	348	16.7			

=== Public School Trustees ===
The Elk Island Public School Board consists of nine trustees, one from Lamont County, two from Fort Saskatchewan, three from Sherwood Park (subdivision 2), one from Strathcona County north (subdivision 3), one from Strathcona County south (subdivision 4), and one from the County of Minburn No. 27.

Elk Island Public Schools Regional Division No. 14
Subdivision 2			Subdivision 3		
Candidate	Votes	%	Candidate	Votes	%
**Lisa G. Brower**	**7,517**	**73.3**	**W.H. (Skip) Gordon**	**1,202**	**61.2**
**Lynn Patterson**	**6,791**	**66.2**	Dean James Kakoschke	762	38.8
**Barb McNeill**	**4,828**	**47.1**	Subdivision 4		
Trina Boymook	3,951	38.5	**Lori Tootoosis-Friesen**	**Acclaimed**	
Paul John Dolynny	3,195	31.2			
Mick Shygera	1,541	15.0			
Savi Rajan	1,521	14.8			
Larry Maclise	1,424	13.9			

=== Separate School Trustees ===
The Elk Island Catholic Separate School Board consists of seven trustees, four from Sherwood Park, one from Camrose, one from Vegreville, and one from Fort Saskatchewan.

Elk Island Catholic Separate Regional Division No. 41
Sherwood Park
Candidate	Votes	%
**Tony Sykora**	**4,164**	**90.7**
**Jean Boisvert**	**3,784**	**82.4**
**Ted Paszek**	**3,771**	**82.1**
**Joann Lloyd**	**3,665**	**79.8**
John Convey	2,987	65.0

== By-election ==
Following being elected as an MLA in the April 2012 provincial election, Ward 5 Councillor Jacquie Fenske resigned her seat on council. A by-election was held on June 25, 2012, this time being contested by four residents.

Councillor
Ward 5
Candidate	Votes	%
Clinton Alexander	304	48.6
Jen Heaton	187	29.9
Bev Williamson	94	15.0
Alec Babich	40	6.4
