= Alberta Regional Network =

- Operating area: Alberta
- Members: 41
- ATMs: Over 400

The Alberta Regional Network (ARN) was an electronic networking organization in Alberta that links Alberta Credit Unions with ATB Financial. It was disbanded in 2010, concurrently with the introduction of chip cards in Canada.

== Benefits ==
Customers of ARN members could use credit union and ATB financial ATMs to pay bills, inquire accounts, and deposit money with any other member institution without having to pay fees.
