= Cathy Olesen =

Canadian politician

Member of the Alberta Legislative Assembly for Sherwood Park
- In office April 23, 2012 – May 5, 2015
- Preceded by: Iris Evans
- Succeeded by: Annie McKitrick

Mayor of Strathcona County
- In office October 26, 2004 – October 26, 2010
- Preceded by: Vern Hartwell
- Succeeded by: Linda Osinchuk

Strathcona County Councillor for Ward 4
- In office 1995 – October 26, 2004
- Preceded by: new ward
- Succeeded by: Peter Wlodarczak

Personal details
- Born: 1960 or 1961 (age 65–66) Winnipeg, Manitoba
- Party: Progressive Conservative
- Spouse: Rex Adam
- Children: 4
- Website: Official website

Cathy Olesen (born c. 1961) is a politician in Alberta, Canada. She served on Strathcona County Council from 1995, first as a councillor then mayor, until her defeat in 2010. Olesen then went into provincial politics, and has represented Sherwood Park from the 2012 provincial election until her defeat in the 2015 provincial election.

== Political career ==
Olesen successfully ran for County councillor, in the new Ward 4, in 1995. She held this position for three terms, until deciding to take a run for mayor. Olesen become mayor of Strathcona County in 2004, and was re-elected in 2007, in a close three-way race. In 2010 Olesen lost to Linda Osinchuk.

In 2012, with Sherwood Park MLA Iris Evans retiring, Olesen ran for the Progressive Conservative (PC) nomination. She won the PC nomination by only one vote over Susan Timanson. On April 23, 2012, Olesen won the Sherwood Park riding, and successfully made her way into provincial politics. On May 5, 2015 Olesen lost to Annie McKitrick.

== Electoral history ==
=== 2015 general election ===
2012 Alberta general election: Sherwood Park
Party	Candidate	Votes	%	±%
Progressive Conservative	Cathy Olesen	8,747	45.62	−17.52
Wildrose	Garnett Genuis	5,948	31.02	
Liberal	Dave Anderson	1,837	9.58	−16.48
New Democratic	Sarah Michelin	1,210	6.31	+0.18
Independent	James Ford	1,064	5.55	
Alberta Party	Chris Kuchmak	230	1.20	
Social Credit	Gordon Barrett	137	0.71	
Total valid votes		19,173		
Rejected, spoiled, and declined		184		
Registered electors / turnout		30,851	62.74	+15.06
Progressive Conservative hold		Swing		−24.27
Source(s) Elections Alberta. "Electoral Division Results: Sherwood Park".

2015 Alberta general election: Sherwood Park
Party	Candidate	Votes	%	±%
New Democratic	Annie McKitrick	11,365	52.05	+45.74
Progressive Conservative	Cathy Olesen	5,655	25.90	-19.72
Wildrose	Linda Osinchuk	4,815	22.05	-8.97
Total valid votes		21,835		
Rejected, spoiled, and declined		143		
Registered electors / turnout		33,048	66.50	+3.76
New Democratic gain from Progressive Conservative		Swing		+32.73
Source(s) Elections Alberta. "Electoral Division Results: Sherwood Park".
