= Payments Canada =

Canadian non-profit financial organization

Payments Canada Canadian Payments Association

Agency overview
- Formed: 1980; 46 years ago
- Minister responsible: François-Philippe Champagne, minister of finance
- Agency executives: Garry Foster, board chair; Susan Hawkins, president and CEO
- Parent departments: Department of Finance; Bank of Canada
- Key documents: Canadian Payments Act; Payment Clearing and Settlement Act
- Website: https://payments.ca

Canadian Payments Association, carrying on business under the brand name Payments Canada, is an organization that operates a payment clearing and settlement system in Canada. The Canadian Payments Association was established by the Canadian Payments Act in 1980. Among other responsibilities, it regulates and maintains directories of bank routing numbers in Canada.

In 2023, Payments Canada systems cleared and settled $112 trillion or $450 billion every business day.

== Services ==
Payments Canada is a corporation that:

- operates and maintains Canadian national systems for the clearing and settlement of payments and other arrangements for the making or exchange of payments;
- facilitates the interaction of Payments Canada's systems with others involved in the exchange, clearing and settlement of payments; and
- facilitates the development of new payment methods and technologies.

=== Systems ===
Clearing and settlement systems are essential to the smooth functioning of the Canadian economy. These systems allow financial institutions to calculate how much is owed to each other as a result of their customer's transactions and to transfer those funds to settle those balances.

Payments Canada operates the following clearing and settlement systems.

1. Lynx — Canada's primary system for clearing and settling large-value, time-critical Canadian dollar transactions. Regulated by the Bank of Canada, it is an electronic wire system that facilitates the transfer of payments in Canadian dollars between Canadian financial institutions across the country. Launched in September 2021, a second release of the system is planned for late 2022 and will enable the ISO 20022 messaging standard.
  - Large Value Transfer System (LVTS) — the system that was replaced by Lynx in September 2021 as Canada's high-value payment system. LVTS was established in 1999.
2. Retail batch payment system, consisting of:
  1. Automated Clearing Settlement System (ACSS) — a system through which Canadian-dollar cheques and electronic payment items (such as direct deposits, ATM withdrawals, point-of-sale transactions, online payments, and pre-authorized debit and bill payments) are cleared and settled. The system tracks the exchange of payment items and the resulting balances due to and from direct participants. ACSS was established in 1984.
  2. U.S. Dollar Bulk Exchange (USBE) — a parallel system to the ACSS used for payment items in US dollars in Canada.

== Governance ==
The Canadian Payments Association carries business under the brand name Payments Canada, which it adopted in 2016.

Payments Canada is headquartered in Ottawa, with an office in Toronto. The organization has 115 members including the Bank of Canada, chartered banks, trust and loan companies, credit union centrals, federations of caisses populaires, and other financial institutions.

The Minister of Finance has oversight responsibilities for Payments Canada. The Governor of the Bank of Canada has oversight responsibility for the LVTS and ACSS under the Payment Clearing and Settlement Act.

The 13-member Board of Directors consists of the organization's president; three directors who are directors, officers or employees of members that, in the normal course of business, maintain a settlement account at the Bank of Canada; two directors who are directors, officers or employees of members other than those described previously); and seven directors who are independent of the association and of its members.

A 20-person "Stakeholder Advisory Council" (SAC) provides advice and input to represent the interests of users of the payments system. The SAC was established in 1996 on a voluntary basis and was formalized in the Canadian Payments Act in 2001. The SAC provides advice to the Payments Canada Board of Directors on payment, clearing, and settlement matters, and contributes input on proposed initiatives, including by-laws, policy statements, and rules that affect third parties. It also identifies issues that might concern payment system users and third-party service providers, and suggests how they could be addressed.

Payments Canada's "Member Advisory Council" (MAC), created in 2015, serves as a consultative and engagement forum for Payment Canada's members.

== Activities ==
Payments Canada is responsible for ensuring that significant rule changes follow an established public consultation process to seek input from key user groups. In 2010, it facilitated industry-wide development with frameworks for contactless debit payments. Payments Canada is also tasked with leading the Canadian effort to adopt ISO 20022.

In 2015, Payments Canada released a 5-year corporate strategic plan, the core purpose of which was to underpin the Canadian financial system and economy by providing safe, efficient, and effective clearing and settlement of payments. Payments Canada identified three long-term desired outcomes that would lead the organization to attaining their vision, addressing payment trends, and managing risks. These desired outcomes are as follows:

1. Modernize — undertaking a multi-year program to modernize the core payments systems, including the rules, standards, and technology infrastructure. In May 2017, with the Bank of Canada and the R3 consortium, as well of some Canadian chartered banks, announced the results of a year-long trial of R3 consortium's Distributed Ledger Technology (DLT), which was decided to not be adopted by Canada at the time for reasons of transaction privacy and scalability.
2. Operate and Enhance — continuing to ensure that the safety, efficiency, and effectiveness of Payment Canada's current systems are met through required enhancements to technology resilience and rules as well as through changes that respond to business needs.
3. Transition and Renewal — continuing to build Payments Canada's organizational capacity and continuing internal process improvements "by focusing on leadership development, risk management, technology, operations and corporate administration."

Payments Canada holds Canada's largest payments conference, The Summit, on an annual basis.
