= Iris Evans =

Canadian politician

The Honourable Iris Evans ECA
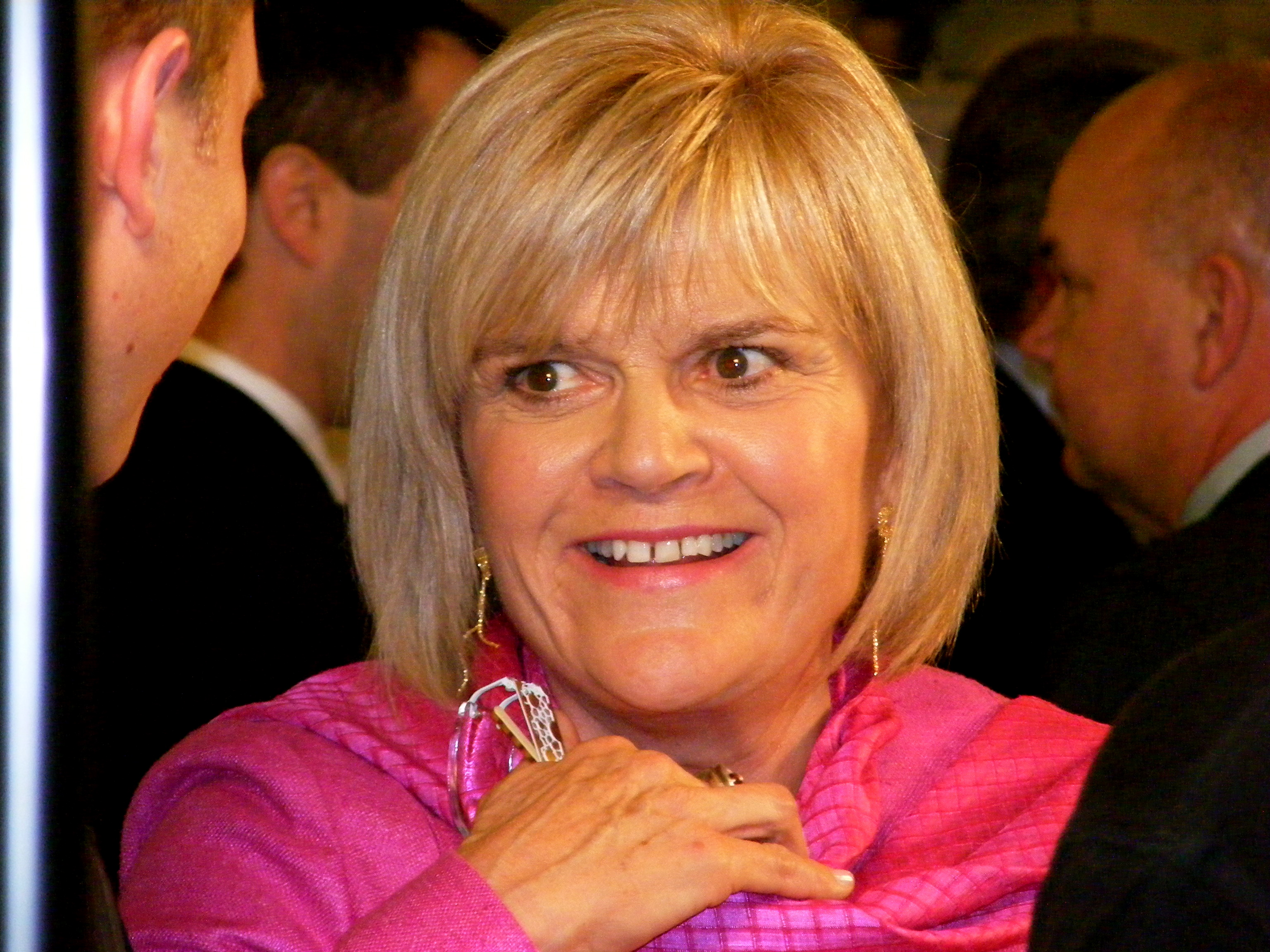
- Evans in April 2009

Member of the Legislative Assembly of Alberta for Sherwood Park
- In office March 11, 1997 – April 23, 2012
- Preceded by: Bruce Collingwood
- Succeeded by: Cathy Olesen

Personal details
- Born: December 31, 1941 (age 84) Calgary, Alberta
- Party: Progressive Conservative
- Occupation: nurse

Iris Sylvia Evans ECA (born December 31, 1941) is a former Member of the Legislative Assembly of Alberta and Minister of International and Intergovernmental Relations for the Canadian province. From November 25, 2004 to December 15, 2006 she served as Alberta's Minister of Health and Wellness in Premier Ralph Klein's cabinet. After Ed Stelmach assumed the office of Premier, she was named Minister of Employment, Immigration and Industry in his cabinet. After the 2008 Alberta provincial election, Premier Stelmach appointed Evans as Minister of Finance and Enterprise. She was moved over to Intergovernmental Relations in January 2010.

A nurse by training, Evans was first elected to the legislature in 1997, representing the riding of Sherwood Park for the Progressive Conservatives. She previously held the portfolios of Minister of Municipal Affairs and Minister of Children's Services. Prior to being elected to the legislature, Evans served as a school board trustee, municipal councillor, and finally as the reeve of Strathcona County.

== Parenting controversy ==
Evans sparked a controversy when speaking to the Economic Club of Canada in Toronto on June 17, 2009, when she answered a question by stating that good parenting means sacrificing income to stay at home while children are young, and that her own children, now grown with young children of their own, "understood perfectly well that when you're raising children, you don't both go off to work and leave them for somebody else to raise."

In response to accusations that she had insulted working women, she later stated that she had not meant to "harm anybody or slam anybody's views on how they chose to parent or what choices they've made on the involvement in their families and parenting," suggesting that this demonstrated society's concern over parenting, and "So maybe its time for this debate ... maybe frequently we should examine what our choices are as families and see whether our choices are the ones that are working best for the child."

Alberta provincial government of Ed Stelmach
Cabinet post (1)
Predecessor	Office	Successor
New portfolio	Minister of Employment, Immigration and Industry; 2006–2008	Hector Goudreau
Alberta provincial government of Ralph Klein
Cabinet posts (3)
Predecessor	Office	Successor
Gary Mar	Minister of Health & Wellness; 2004–2006	David Hancock
New portfolio	Minister of Children's Services; 1999-2004	Heather Forsyth
	Minister of Municipal Affairs; 1997-1999	Walter Pazkowski
