= Annie McKitrick =

Canadian politician

Member of the Legislative Assembly of Alberta for Sherwood Park
- In office May 5, 2015 – March 19, 2019
- Preceded by: Cathy Olesen
- Succeeded by: Jordan Walker

Personal details
- Born: 1952 (age 73–74) France
- Party: Alberta New Democratic Party
- Occupation: Social worker, Community planner

Annie Jeanne Francoise McKitrick (born 1952) is a Canadian politician who represented the electoral district of Sherwood Park in the Legislative Assembly of Alberta from 2015 to 2019.

== Early life and career ==
McKitrick, born in France, came to Canada to attend McGill University, where she obtained a bachelor of science in ecology. McKitrick also has a master's degree in education and a diploma in public-sector management from the University of Victoria.

McKitrick worked as a researcher with a grant from the Canadian International Development Agency in Kyrgyzstan, as a co-ordinator for income generating projects in Thailand, and for a nongovernmental organization responsible for refugee and community development programs in Southeast Asia.

From 1996 until 2005, McKitrick was a school trustee and chair of the Richmond school board in Richmond, British Columbia.

== Provincial politics ==
McKitrick was elected to the Legislative Assembly of Alberta in the 2015 Alberta general election representing the electoral district of Sherwood Park. On October 17, 2017 she was sworn in as the Parliamentary Secretary to the Minister of Education. She was defeated in the 2019 Alberta general election.

In 2026, McKitrick endorsed Avi Lewis in that year's federal NDP leadership race.

== Electoral history ==
=== 2019 general election ===
2019 Alberta general election: Sherwood Park
Party	Candidate	Votes	%	±%
United Conservative	Jordan Walker	12,119	45.37	-2.96
New Democratic	Annie McKitrick	10,685	40.00	-11.65
Alberta Party	Sue Timanson	3,509	13.14	+13.12
Alberta Independence	Brian Ilkuf	216	0.81	–
Alberta Advantage Party	Chris Glassford	183	0.69	–
Total		26,712	99.34	–
Rejected, spoiled and declined		178	0.66	
Turnout		26,890	76.69	
Eligible voters		35,061		
United Conservative notional gain from New Democratic		Swing		+4.35
Source(s) Source: "81 - Sherwood Park, 2019 Alberta general election". officialresults.elections.ab.ca. Elections Alberta. Alberta. Chief Electoral Officer (2019). 2019 General Election. A Report of the Chief Electoral Officer. Volume II (PDF) (Report). Vol. 2. Edmonton, Alta.: Elections Alberta. pp. 394–398. ISBN 978-1-988620-12-1.

=== 2015 general election ===
2015 Alberta general election: Sherwood Park
Party	Candidate	Votes	%	±%
New Democratic	Annie McKitrick	11,365	52.05	+45.74
Progressive Conservative	Cathy Olesen	5,655	25.90	-19.72
Wildrose	Linda Osinchuk	4,815	22.05	-8.97
Total valid votes		21,835		
Rejected, spoiled, and declined		143		
Registered electors / turnout		33,048	66.50	+3.76
New Democratic gain from Progressive Conservative		Swing		+32.73
Source(s) Elections Alberta. "Electoral Division Results: Sherwood Park".
