= 2013 Wood Buffalo municipal election =

2013 Regional Municipality of Wood Buffalo municipal election
← 2010	October 21, 2013	2017 →

Mayor and 10 councilors to Wood Buffalo Council
Candidate	Melissa Blake	Gene Ouellette	Jim Rogers
Last election	7,799	did not run	did not run
Popular vote	6,987	3,477	1,120
Percentage	60.3	30.0	9.8
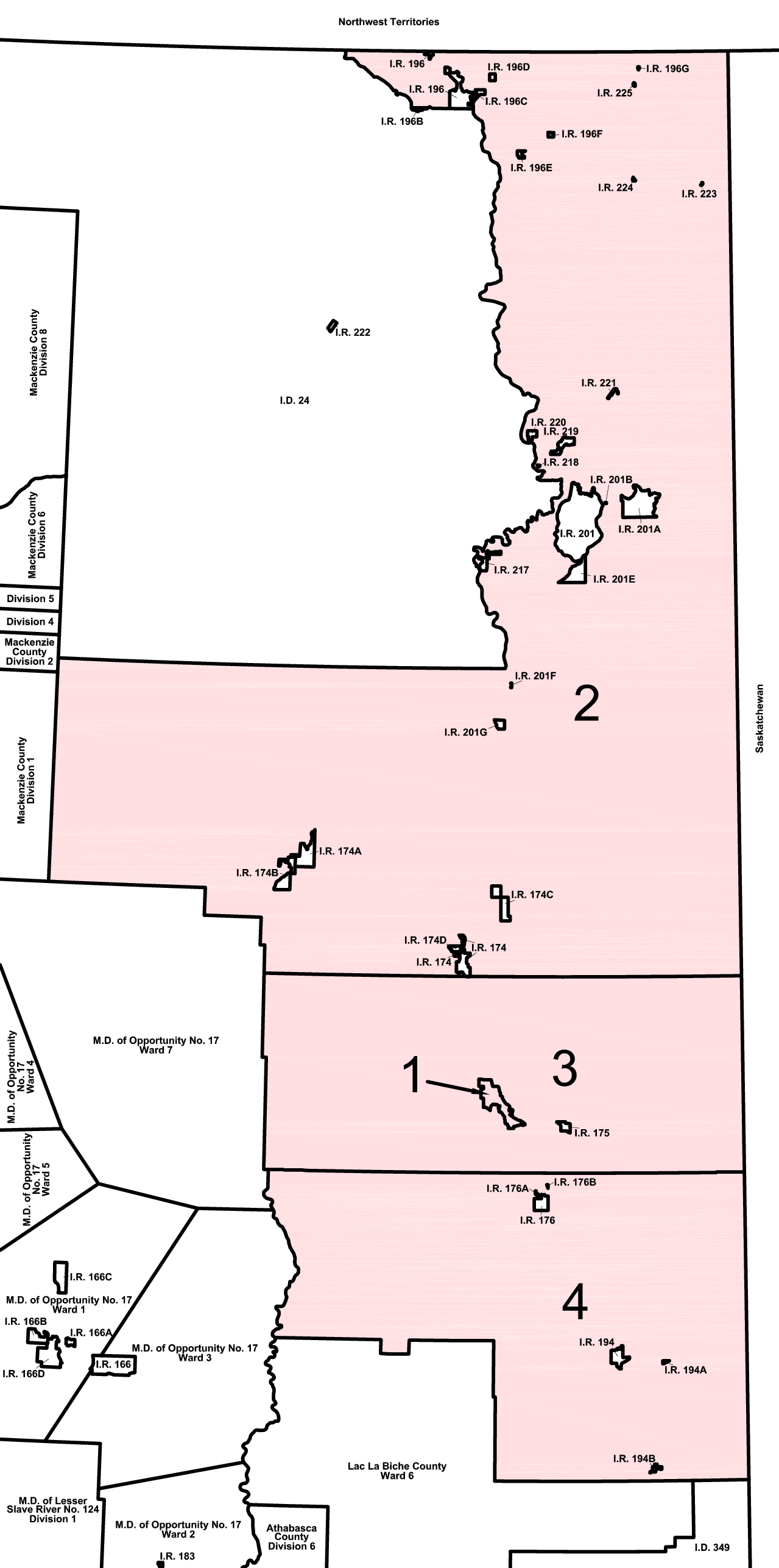
- Wood Buffalo and surrounding wards (click to enlarge)
Mayor before election
Melissa Blake
Elected mayor
Melissa Blake

The 2013 Regional Municipality of Wood Buffalo municipal election was held Monday, October 21, 2013. From 1968 to 2013, provincial legislation has required every municipality to hold elections every three years. The Alberta Legislative Assembly passed a bill on December 5, 2012, amending the Local Authorities Election Act. Starting with the 2013 elections, officials are elected for a four-year term, and municipal elections are moved to a four-year cycle.

The citizens of the Regional Municipality of Wood Buffalo, Alberta, elected one mayor, ten councillors, the five Fort McMurray Public School District trustees (in Fort McMurray), five of the Northland School Division No. 61's 23 school boards (outside Fort McMurray, three or five trustees each), and the five Fort McMurray Roman Catholic Separate School District No. 32 trustees (in Fort McMurray). Wood Buffalo includes Fort McMurray, an urban service area deemed equivalent of a city.

== Results ==
Bold indicates elected, and incumbents are italicized.

=== Mayor ===
Mayor
Candidate	Votes	%
**Melissa Blake**	**6,987**	**60.3**
Gene Ouellette	3,477	30.0
Jim Rogers	1,120	9.8

=== Councillors ===
Council consists of ten councillors, six from Ward 1, two from Ward 2, one from Ward 3, and one from Ward 4.

Councillors
Ward 1			Ward 2			Ward 3			Ward 4		
Candidate	Votes	%	Candidate	Votes	%	Candidate	Votes	%	Candidate	Votes	%
**Guy C. Boutilier**	**6,649**	**12.7**	**Julia Cardinal**	**130**	**23.7**	**Allan Glenn Vinni**	**206**	**60.1**	**Jane Stroud**	**268**	**72.0**
**Sheldon Germain**	**6,037**	**11.5**	**John H. (H.J.) Chadi**	**119**	**21.7**	Bradley Friesen	137	39.9	Bob Galbraith	56	15.1
**Phil Meagher**	**5,642**	**10.8**	Lloyd (Sonny) Flett	108	19.7				Gordon S. Janvier	48	12.9
**Lance E. Bussieres**	**4,349**	**8.3**	David Blair	101	18.4						
**Tyran Ault**	**4,106**	**7.8**	Edith Fraser	90	16.4						
**Keith McGrath**	**3.874**	**7.4**									
Colleen Tatum	3,770	7.2									
Veronica Doleman	3,276	6.3									
Christine Burton	3,193	6.1									
Russell Vincent Thomas	2,910	5.6									
Jon Tupper	2,534	4.8									
Steve Kelly	2,216	4.2									
Carmen Ramstead-Royer	1,723	3.3									
Abbas Abbas	1,428	2.7									
Andrew Manyevere	589	1.1									

=== Public School Trustees ===
Fort McMurray Public School District
Candidate	Votes	%
**Angela Adams**	**4,249**	**19.6**
**Jeff Thompson**	**4,115**	**19.0**
**Linda Mywaart**	**3,711**	**17.2**
**Stephan Drover**	**3,478**	**16.1**
**Tim O'Hara**	**3,475**	**16.1**
Mohamed (Moe) Farhat	2,595	12.0
