= 2010 Wood Buffalo municipal election =

2010 election in Alberta, Canada

2010 Regional Municipality of Wood Buffalo municipal election
- October 18, 2010

Mayor and 10 councilors to Wood Buffalo Council
Candidate	Melissa Blake	John Vyboh
Last election	5,115	Ran as councillor
Popular vote	7,799	2,394
Percentage	73.3	22.5
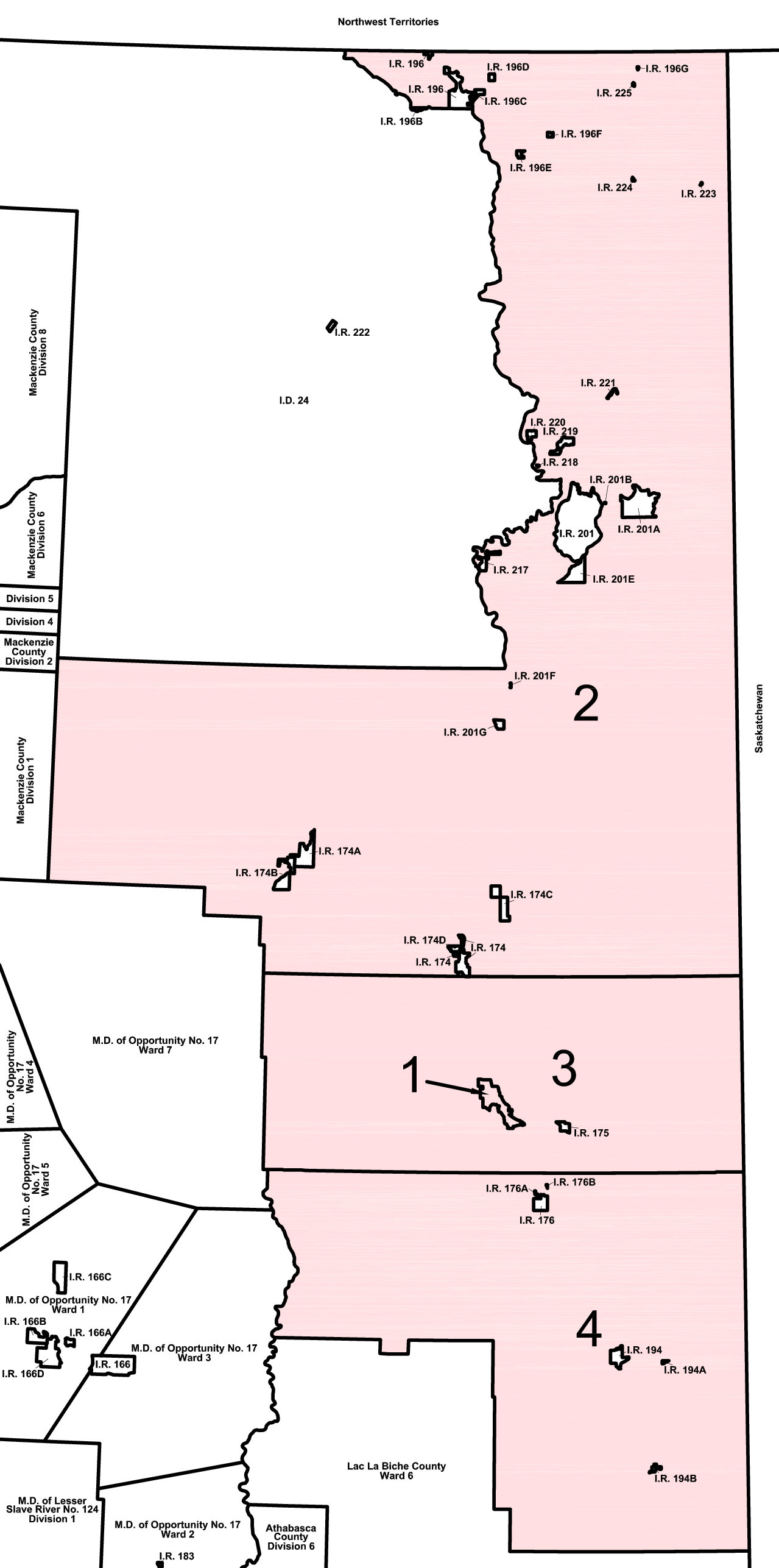
- Wood Buffalo and surrounding wards (click to enlarge)
Mayor before election
Melissa Blake
Elected mayor
Melissa Blake

The 2010 Regional Municipality of Wood Buffalo municipal election was held Monday, October 18, 2010. Since 1968, provincial legislation has required every municipality to hold triennial elections. The citizens of Wood Buffalo, (this includes the Urban Service Area of Fort McMurray,) Alberta, elected one mayor, eight of their ten councillors, the five Fort McMurray Public School District trustees (in Fort McMurray), three of the Northland School Division No. 61's 23 school boards (outside Fort McMurray, three or five trustees each), and the five Fort McMurray Roman Catholic Separate School District No. 32 trustees (in Fort McMurray). The two incumbent Ward 2 councillors had no challengers, and the school boards for Anzac and Janvier were acclaimed.

== Results ==
Bold indicates elected, and incumbents are italicized.

=== Mayor ===
Mayor
Candidate	Votes	%
**Melissa Blake**	**7,799**	**73.3**
John Vyboh	2,394	22.5
Joe Nebesny	301	2.8
George A. Mercredi	146	1.4

=== Councillors ===
Council consists of ten members, six from Ward 1, two from Ward 2, one from Ward 3, and one from Ward 4.

Councillors
Ward 1			Ward 2			Ward 3			Ward 4		
Candidate	Votes	%	Candidate	Votes	%	Candidate	Votes	%	Candidate	Votes	%
**Sheldon Germain**	**6,340**	**81.2**	**David A. Blair**	**Acclaimed**		**Allan G. Vinni**	**168**	**58.3**	**Jane Stroud**	**127**	**33.7**
**Mike Allen**	**5,728**	**73.4**	**Sonny Flett**	**Acclaimed**		Ed Tatum	120	41.7	Kevin Tremblay	107	28.4
**Phil Meagher**	**5,614**	**71.9**							Mickey Cadden	60	15.9
**Dave Kirschner**	**4,976**	**63.7**							Lorne (Chucks) Wilzen	60	15.9
**Donald K. Scott**	**4,566**	**58.5**							Gordon Janvier	23	6.1
**Russell Thomas**	**3,952**	**50.6**									
Christine Burton	3,616	46.3									
Mila Byron	2,820	36.1									
Ross Jacobs	2,817	36.1									
Mohammad Shafiq Doger	1,593	20.4									
Byron Bailey	1,244	15.9									
Rick Haney	1,178	15.1									
Gareth Norris	936	12.0									
Gregory Lucas	910	11.7									
Travis Dawson	563	7.2									

=== Public School Trustees ===
Fort McMurray Public School District
Candidate	Votes	%
**Jeff Thompson**	**3,622**	**99.8**
**Angela Adams**	**3,323**	**91.5**
**Linda Mywaart**	**3,173**	**87.4**
**Glenn Cooper**	**2,819**	**77.6**
**Stephanie Blackler**	**2,718**	**74.9**
Glenn Doonanco	2,502	68.9

Northland School Division No. 61
Fort Chipewyan			Fort MacKay			Anzac	
Candidate	Votes	%	Candidate	Votes	%	**Marc Cote**	Acclaimed
**Claris Voyageur**	**100**	**96.2**	**Janet Lynn McDonald**	**20**	**87.0**	**Dave Czibere**	Acclaimed
**Lorraine J Cardinal**	**98**	**84.2**	**Tina Lorraine Black**	**17**	**73.9**	**Nadine Catherine Finch**	Acclaimed
**Joseph Tuccaro**	**89**	**85.6**	**Shelly Lynn Harte**	**17**	**73.9**	**Dana Janvier**	Acclaimed
**Julia Cardinal**	**87**	**83.7**	Janine E. McDonald	10	43.5	**Cindy McIntosh**	Acclaimed
**Judy-Ann Cardinal**	**59**	**56.7**	Doris Marlene Young	5	21.7	Janvier	
John Chadi	49	47.1	Conklin			**Dolores Cardinal-Galloway**	Acclaimed
Paul Steven Tuccaro	37	35.6	**Vern Quintal-Janvier**	**54**	**90.0**	**Herman Darrell**	Acclaimed
			**Dean Olson**	**51**	**85.0**	**Helen Lena Herman**	Acclaimed
			**Wendy Tremblay**	**51**	**85.0**	**Alice Lofstrom**	Acclaimed
			**Margaret A. Quintal**	**47**	**78.3**	**Bertha Anne Moir**	Acclaimed
			**Shirly A. Tremblay**	**41**	**68.3**		
			Agnes L. Novak	36	60.0		
			Shawnene Lavallee	20	33.3		

=== Separate School Trustees ===
Fort McMurray Roman Catholic Separate School District No. 32
Candidate	Votes	%
**Geraldine Carbery**	**1,911**	**76.6**
**Tracy McKinnon**	**1,786**	**71.6**
**Cherie Cormier**	**1,664**	**66.7**
**Nicholas Keith McGrath**	**1,568**	**62.9**
**Kirk Behrisch**	**1,323**	**53.0**
Robert Yaro	1,183	47.4
Maria Salvo-Vyboh	1,041	41.7
Carrie Dirk	1,001	40.1
Luarelle Dutchyn-Bouchard	994	39.9

== By-election ==
Following being elected as MLAs in the April 2012 provincial election, Ward 1 Councillors Mike Allen and Don Scott resigned their seats on council. A by-election was held on June 25, 2012, this time being contested by 14 Fort McMurray residents.

Councillor
Ward 1
Candidate	Votes	%
Colleen Tatum	1,301	29.1
Christie Burton	1,162	26.0
Keith McGrath	1,044	23.3
Tyran Ault	991	22.1
Robert Parmenter	753	16.8
Matt Youens	752	16.8
Shafique Khan	700	15.6
James Anthony	361	8.1
John Mulhall	361	8.1
Byron Bailey	173	3.9
Bill Nahirney	89	2.0
Joe the Plumber Nebesny	83	1.9
Chris Alton	79	1.8
Valance Howard	44	1.0
