= Tany Yao =

Canadian politician

- 姚泰尼
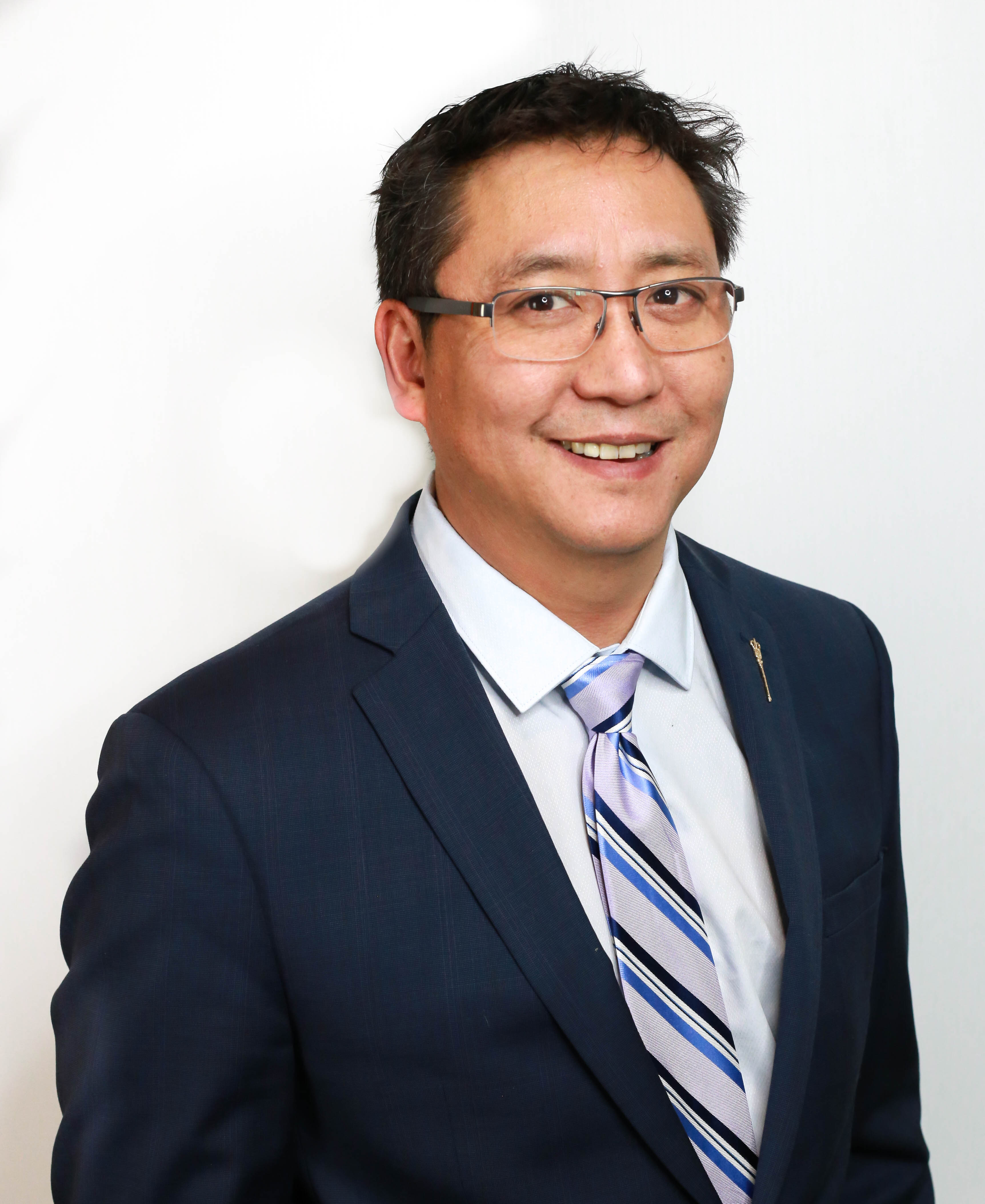

Member of the Legislative Assembly of Alberta for Fort McMurray-Wood Buffalo
- Incumbent
- Assumed office May 5, 2015
- Preceded by: Mike Allen

Personal details
- Born: 1971 (age 54–55) Grand Falls, New Brunswick
- Party: United Conservative Party
- Other party: Wildrose (2015–2017)
- Occupation: Paramedic, firefighter

Tany Yao (born 1971) is a Canadian politician who was elected in the 2015 and 2019 Alberta general elections to represent the electoral district of Fort McMurray-Wood Buffalo in the 29th and 30th Alberta Legislatures.

== Background ==
Yao was born in Grand Falls, New Brunswick and moved to Fort McMurray, Alberta in 1977 at the age of six. His father, Joseph Yao, was originally from Cebu in the Philippines and eventually worked as a doctor in Fort McMurray. His mother, Keiko, was a nurse within the community.

Yao graduated from Fort McMurray Composite High School in 1989 and enrolled in the EMT program at Portage College in Lac La Biche, Alberta. He studied to become a paramedic at NAIT in Edmonton, Alberta. After graduating from NAIT, Yao worked with the Alberta Central Air Ambulance in Lac La Biche before returning to Fort McMurray as a paramedic firefighter. He was involved in the effort to fight the House River Fire in 2002. In 2007, Yao worked as the Assistant Deputy Chief of Operations - EMS for the region of Wood Buffalo. In 2016, former premier Rachel Notley named him one of the heroes of the Fort McMurray wildfires for his efforts in helping evacuees.

== Political career ==
In late 2014 Yao considered running for office after Wildrose party was in disarray after leader Danielle Smith and eight other MLAs crossed the floor to the ruling Progressive Conservative Association of Alberta. After Brian Jean was elected as the official leader of the Wildrose Party, Yao decided to run in the riding of Fort McMurray-Wood Buffalo, and defeated Progressive Conservative incumbent MLA Mike Allen in the 2015 Alberta election.

Yao supported Jean in the 2017 UCP leadership election, ultimately won by Jason Kenney, held after the Wildrose Party and Progressive Conservatives merged together to form the United Conservative Party. After the election, Yao was appointed the UCP's Health and Emergency Response Preparedness critic. Re-elected in 2019, Yao again supported Jean in the UCP leadership election held after Kenney's 2022 resignation. Following the election, Yao was appointed parliamentary secretary for rural health by new Premier Danielle Smith.

Ahead of the 2023 election, Yao was challenged by former UCP riding association board member Zulkifl Mujahid and Fort McMurray Construction Association president Keith Plowman for the UCP nomination, which Mujahid ultimately won. After the UCP board disqualified Mujahid in April 2023, Yao was appointed the party's candidate in his place.

=== Travel controversy ===
Yao travelled to Mexico at the end of 2020 despite regulations that required Albertans to avoid non-essential travel due to the coronavirus pandemic. A spokesperson for the United Conservative Party said on Jan. 4, 2021 that Yao was unreachable and the party did not know where he was in Mexico.

Yao was reached by Fort McMurray Today on January 5, 2021, and said he turned his phone off upon arrival in Mexico. He said he wanted to "disconnect and clear my head" because he felt he had faced "abuse and slander in social and mainstream media" over a private member's bill he wrote. Yao was referring to a bill ending the ban on health authorities making private purchases of human blood plasma, which had been opposed by the NDP and health care groups. He also said he believed it would be safe to travel because of the release of COVID-19 vaccines, but he said he had not yet been vaccinated when he left for Mexico.

Kenney removed Yao from the Standing Committee on Families and Communities and the Standing Committee on Privileges and Elections, Standing Orders and Printing.

== Electoral history ==
=== 2023 general election ===
2023 Alberta general election: Fort McMurray-Wood Buffalo
Party	Candidate	Votes	%	±%
United Conservative	Tany Yao	6,483	67.7	-3.36
New Democratic	Tanika Chaisson	1,884	19.7	-1.95
Independent	Funky Banjoko	625	6.5	–
Independent	Zulkifl Mujahid	331	3.5	–
Alberta Party	Bradley Friesen	255	2.7	-2.86
Total		10,455	100	–
Rejected and declined		86	0.5	
Turnout		9,578	41.60	
Eligible voters		23,219		
United Conservative hold		Swing		-1.41
Source(s) Source: Elections Alberta

UCP Fort McMurray-Wood Buffalo nomination contest: December 4, 2022

Candidate	Round 1		Round 2	
Candidate	Votes	%	Votes	%
Zulkifl Mujahid	188	38.6	212	51.0
Tany Yao	152	31.2	204	49.0
Keith Plowman	147	30.2	Eliminated	
Total	487	100.0	416	100.0

Note: Zulkifl Mujahid was later removed as the UCP candidate and Yao was appointed as the candidate in April 2023.

=== 2019 general election ===
2019 Alberta general election: Fort McMurray-Wood Buffalo
Party	Candidate	Votes	%	±%
United Conservative	Tany Yao	10,269	71.06%	5.00%
New Democratic	Stephen Drover	3,129	21.65%	-8.77%
Alberta Party	Marcus Erlandson	804	5.56%	–
Alberta Independence	Michael Keller	249	1.72%	–
Total		14,451	–	–
Rejected, spoiled and declined		43	34	13
Eligible electors / turnout		22,497	64.48%	22.54%
United Conservative hold		Swing		6.93%
Source(s) Source: "61 - Fort McMurray-Wood Buffalo, 2019 Alberta general election". officialresults.elections.ab.ca. Elections Alberta. Alberta. Chief Electoral Officer (2019). 2019 General Election. A Report of the Chief Electoral Officer. Volume II (PDF) (Report). Vol. 2. Edmonton, Alta.: Elections Alberta. pp. 275–278. ISBN 978-1-988620-12-1. Change and swing for UCP candidate is based on the combination of Wildrose and PC candidate results.

=== 2015 general election ===
2015 Alberta general election: Fort McMurray-Wood Buffalo
Party	Candidate	Votes	%	±%
Wildrose	Tany Yao	3,835	40.03	-2.92
New Democratic	Stephen Drover	2,915	30.42	+25.37
Progressive Conservative	Mike Allen	2,486	25.95	-23.04
Liberal	Robin Le Fevre	345	3.60	+0.59
Total valid votes		9,581		
Rejected, spoiled and declined		76		
Eligible electors / Turnout		22,940	42.10	+7.97
Wildrose gain from Progressive Conservative		Swing		+10.06
Source(s) Elections Alberta. "Electoral Division Results: Fort McMurray-Wood Buffalo".
