= Guy Boutilier =

Canadian politician (1959–2024)

The Honourable Guy C. Boutilier ECA
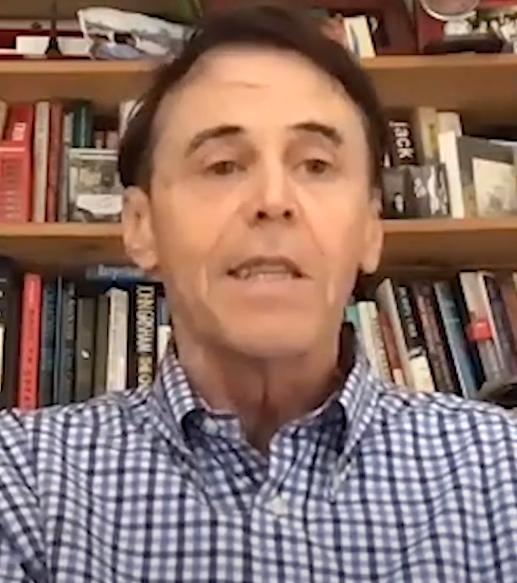
- Boutilier in 2023

Member of the Legislative Assembly of Alberta for Fort McMurray-Wood Buffalo Fort McMurray (1997-2004)
- In office March 11, 1997 – April 23, 2012
- Preceded by: Adam Germain
- Succeeded by: Mike Allen

Alberta Minister of International, Intergovernmental, and Aboriginal Relations
- In office December 15, 2006 – March 12, 2008
- Preceded by: Pearl Calahasen (Aboriginal Affairs); Gary Mar (International and Intergovernmental Relations)
- Succeeded by: Gene Zwozdesky (Aboriginal Affairs); Ron Stevens (International and Intergovernmental Relations)

Alberta Minister of the Environment
- In office November 24, 2004 – December 15, 2006
- Preceded by: Lorne Taylor
- Succeeded by: Rob Renner

Alberta Minister of Municipal Affairs
- In office March 15, 2001 – November 24, 2004
- Preceded by: Walter Paszkowski
- Succeeded by: Rob Renner

Mayor of the Regional Municipality of Wood Buffalo
- In office April 1, 1995 – 1997
- Preceded by: New municipality
- Succeeded by: Doug Faulkner

Mayor of Fort McMurray
- In office October 22, 1992 – April 1, 1995
- Preceded by: E.C. (Betty) Collicott
- Succeeded by: Amalgamated Regional Charter

Fort McMurray Alderman
- In office October 20, 1986 – October 22, 1992

Personal details
- Born: February 28, 1959 Glace Bay, Nova Scotia, Canada
- Died: March 8, 2024 (aged 65)
- Party: Independent (2009–2010; 2017–)
- Other political affiliations: Progressive Conservative (1997–2009); Wildrose Alliance (2010–2017)
- Spouse: Gail
- Education: St. Francis Xavier University; St. Mary's University; Harvard University

Guy Carleton Boutilier ECA (February 28, 1959 – March 8, 2024) was a Canadian politician, who sat as a member of the Legislative Assembly of Alberta from 1997 to 2012. He was elected as a Progressive Conservative, and served in several capacities in the Cabinet of Alberta under Premiers Ralph Klein and Ed Stelmach before being ejected from the PC caucus in July 2009; he joined the Wildrose Alliance Party after sitting as an independent for a year.

Before entering provincial politics during the 1997 Alberta election, he was involved in municipal politics, having served two terms on the city council of Fort McMurray before being elected mayor of that city in 1992. When Fort McMurray was amalgamated with the surrounding area to form the Regional Municipality of Wood Buffalo in 1995, Boutilier served as the new municipality's first mayor.

As MLA for Fort McMurray-Wood Buffalo and Fort McMurray, Boutilier served on the Executive Council of Alberta.

== Early life ==
Boutilier was born in Glace Bay, Nova Scotia on February 28, 1959.

Boutilier earned a Bachelor of Business Administration from St. Francis Xavier University, a Bachelor of Education from St. Mary's University, and a Master of Public Administration from Harvard University. He has worked as a financial analyst in the petroleum industry and as a business management instructor at Keyano College. He was lecturing business economics at the University of Alberta's school of business.

Boutilier moved to Fort McMurray as a summer student with Syncrude and, according to friend and supporter Willie Hoflin, "fell in love with the place" and met his wife, Gail.

He volunteered with Fort McMurray's local hockey and sports scenes. He hosted a hockey-themed interview show on a community access channel. His signoff of “we have the energy!” became "an affectionate rallying cry for Fort McMurray," according to Fort McMurray Today.

== Political career ==
=== Municipal politics ===
Boutilier was elected to the Fort McMurray city council on October 20, 1986, to a three-year term as alderman. He was re-elected October 16, 1989, and was elected the youngest mayor in the city's history October 22, 1992. He served in this capacity until April 1, 1995, when Fort McMurray lost its status as a city and was rolled into the new Regional Municipality of Wood Buffalo. He was the first mayor of this new municipality, serving until 1997 when he resigned to enter provincial politics.

=== Provincial politics ===
Boutilier was first elected to the Legislative Assembly of Alberta in the 1997 Alberta election, when he ran as the Progressive Conservative candidate in Fort McMurray. The incumbent Liberal, Adam Germain, was not seeking re-election, and Boutilier won by defeating John Vyboh by more than a thousand votes. As a backbencher, he moved several bills: the Mines and Minerals Amendment Act was a 1997 government bill designed to enable the implementation of a generic royalty regime for new development in the Alberta oilsands and streamline the process for land leases to oil and gas companies by moving administrative elements from legislation to regulation. The bill passed with Liberal support, but New Democratic leader Pam Barrett opposed the bill out of concerns that it left the legislature out of debates in which it should play a role and provided overly-generous incentives to oil companies without requiring anything from them in return. Also in 1997, Boutilier sponsored the Cost Declaration Accountability Act, a private member's bill that never reached second reading.

In 1998, Boutilier sponsored two more bills. The Railway Act was a government bill that modernized the rules governing the operation of railways in Alberta. The Liberals expressed general support for the bill, but ultimately opposed it on the basis of a clause that allowed cabinet to make regulations on "any matter that the Minister considers is not provided for or is insufficiently provided for" in the Act, which they considered to be dangerously broad. The bill passed. The same year, Boutilier sponsored the Government Accountability Amendment Act, a private member's bill that would have required all government bills to include an associated financial cost to come before the legislature with an estimate of those costs for the ensuing three years. The bill was hoisted for six months on second reading on a motion by Wayne Cao, which, since the legislature was not in session six months later, effectively killed the bill.

Boutilier was re-elected in the 2001 election with a substantially increased margin over Vyboh. Following the 2001 election, Premier Ralph Klein named Boutilier to his cabinet as the Minister of Municipal Affairs. In this capacity, Boutilier sponsored the Municipal Government Amendment Act in 2003. The Act allowed municipalities to charge developers off-site road levies, a practice which had been common but which had recently been successfully challenged in court, and passed largely without controversy. Boutilier kept the municipal affairs until after the 2004 election (in which he was again re-elected handily, this time in the newly formed Fort McMurray-Wood Buffalo riding), when Klein transferred him to the post of Minister of the Environment. He held this post in 2005, when a Canadian National Railway train derailed, spilling oil into Wabamun Lake. At the time, Boutilier described himself as "damn well pissed off" about the spill and about the allegation that CN had neglected to report that the spill contained carcinogenic chemical, and pledged "to bring to the full extent of the law anyone who has breached Alberta law." CN was eventually charged under federal statutes. He was also at the forefront of his government's opposition to the Kyoto Protocol, at one point slipping his Quebec counterpart Thomas Mulcair a note during a United Nations conference on the subject in Montreal, which Mulcair interpreted as a request that Quebec soften its support of Kyoto in exchange for investment in the Montreal Stock Exchange by Alberta industry. Boutilier characterized the note as "discussions in terms of what we would want to be able to do in a positive environmental initiative" and denied that he was trying to influence Quebec's position.

==== Expulsion from the PC caucus ====
In the 2006 Progressive Conservative leadership election, Boutilier initially backed Lyle Oberg, and switched his support to eventual winner Ed Stelmach after Oberg was eliminated on the first ballot. When Stelmach succeeded Klein as premier, he named a smaller cabinet than Klein's. This included a merger of the Aboriginal Affairs portfolio with Intergovernmental and International Relations, and Stelmach gave the expanded portfolio to Boutilier.

That same year, Stelmach also announced that the construction of a $35-million, 48-bed long-term care centre in Fort McMurray would be a priority for his government. But the next year, Health Minister Ron Liepert said the project would be delayed by at least four years. Liepert said the project was not an immediate priority because Fort McMurray’s growing population at the time was young.

Boutilier was re-elected by another expanded margin in the 2008 election, but was not named to Stelmach's new cabinet, making him the only returning member of the pre-election cabinet not to receive a portfolio. His demotion was met with protest in his home riding, which contains much of the oilsands activity driving Alberta's economy at the time, and the local Progressive Conservative riding association sent a letter of protest to Stelmach.

Boutilier also became a vocal critic of the government for delaying the long-term care facility, and compared the treatment of Fort McMurray’s seniors at the Northern Lights Regional Health Centre to being kept in "holding cells." He also said Liepert was "talking gibberish."

In July 2009, Stelmach kicked Boutilier out of the Progressive Conservative caucus for publicly criticizing the government’s delay of the facility. Stelmach's spokesman said that his ejection was due to his seeking "preferential treatment" for his riding; Boutilier denied that he had done so.

==== Joining the Wildrose caucus ====
In June 2010, after nearly a year as an independent, he joined the Wildrose Alliance Party, saying that the move was "a natural flow,” and in hindsight calling his expulsion from the PC Party "the best thing that ever happened to me in my political career.”

Boutilier was joined by fellow former Tories Heather Forsyth and Rob Anderson. As an Opposition MLA, Boutilier was a vocal critic of the PC government’s handling of education, health care, transportation, infrastructure and housing in Fort McMurray.

He continued to demand a long-term care centre project and progress on twinning Highway 63, which had been announced and was scheduled to be finished in 2012. The highway between Fort McMurray and Atmore would not be twinned until 2016.

In the 2012 Alberta election, Boutilier ran for re-election as a Wildrose candidate in the new electoral district of Fort McMurray-Wood Buffalo. He was defeated by PC candidate Mike Allen.

=== Return to municipal politics ===
In July 2013, Allen was arrested in a prostitution sting during a government trip to St. Paul, Minnesota. Boutilier remained silent on a possible political comeback, but in October, announced he would be seeking a Ward 1 municipal council seat in the Regional Municipality of Wood Buffalo.

When it came to local governance, Boutilier commented that residents were beginning to feel that "the inmates are running the asylum." Boutilier won one of six seats representing the urban Ward 1 covering Fort McMurray. He quickly earned a reputation on council as a strong fiscally conservative voice who frequently criticized past administrations for hiring companies and consultants based outside Alberta.

==== Residency controversy ====
In May 2014, Fort McMurray Today discovered Boutilier did consultant work for the municipality prior to being elected to council. After the 2012 provincial election, he was working as an urban planning and political consultant and submitted a "strategic roadmap" for projects approved by the previous council administration.

Boutilier was paid $2,957.58 for his two-page report. This included a $1,050 expense for two round trips from Edmonton to Fort McMurray. The report and invoice was leaked to the newspaper and showed Boutilier ran his consulting business out of a residential home in Edmonton.

The address and the expenses raised questions regarding Boutilier's residency and his eligibility to hold a council seat. Boutilier said he owned an Edmonton home because his son regularly had treatments related to his autism at the Glenrose Rehabilitation Hospital and he lectured part-time at the University of Alberta.

In November 2014, a Fort McMurray business owner named Robert Vargo, who supported Boutilier's Wildrose campaign, filed a legal challenge questioning Boutilier's residency. Vargo wrote in his affidavit that Boutilier had moved to Edmonton shortly after Stelmach expelled him from the Progressive Conservative Party's caucus. Three more people filed separate affidavits claiming they rented Boutilier's Fort McMurray home and rarely saw him. They also claimed Boutilier was claiming a northern living allowance, despite allegedly living in Edmonton.

Boutilier's lawyer dismissed the affidavits as "a frivolous application" and said a defence was being prepared. At the same time, Fort McMurray Today reported Boutilier had started looking for new jobs in the private sector as questions about his eligibility to sit on council were raised in the community.

==== Resignation from council ====
The claims made by Vargo and the three individuals never went to court. In January 2015, Boutilier resigned from council one day after Vargo dropped the challenge. Boutilier denied his resignation was related to the dropped case. The lawyers for Vargo and Boutilier said the motivations behind dropping the challenge would remain a private matter between the two men.

On the same day as his resignation, Boutilier purchased a membership with the Progressive Conservative Party's riding association for Fort McMurray-Wood Buffalo, leaving many to believe he would attempt to run as an MLA in the 2015 Alberta general election. Boutilier said he was returning to the party because of the leadership of Premier Jim Prentice. He said his expulsion from the PC caucus was "water under the bridge."

The PC nomination in Fort McMurray-Wood Buffalo went to incumbent MLA Mike Allen and was not challenged by Boutilier.

== Post-politics and legacy ==
Boutilier was affectionately nicknamed "Guy Boots" during his political career. He reminded people his first name was pronounced with the French pronunciation, Ghee, while his last name was anglicized Boot-a-LEER.

Hoflin notes Boutilier was an introvert in his personal life, but an extroverted politician who frequently joked with constituents, journalists, politicians and staff from all parties. At the same time, Hoflin says Boutilier was combative on his views.

Dan MacLennan, who served as president of the Alberta Union of Provincial Employees between 1997 and 2006, credits Boutilier for securing a northern living allowance for AUPE members in Fort McMurray. Vaughn Jessome, Boutilier’s former constituency assistant and a long-time friend, said Boutilier was instrumental in founding the Stepping Stones Youth Home in Fort McMurray.

After Boutilier's death, Fort McMurray Today reported that Jessome felt Boutilier was "vindicated on his biggest fights."

A continuing care centre opened in Fort McMurray in July 2021. The groundbreaking ceremony was held on April 20, 2018. It was approved in 2015 by Premier Rachel Notley, of the Alberta New Democratic Party, following lobbying from Brian Jean, the MLA for Fort McMurray-Conklin and then-leader of the Wildrose Party. Both Notley and Jean agreed the project had been mismanaged and needlessly delayed by the former PC government.

Shortly after the groundbreaking ceremony, Boutilier told Fort McMurray Today in 2018 he had no regrets about his actions that led to his expulsion from the PC caucus.

“It’s important to stand on principle. When someone promises something and they don’t deliver, you can sit back and say nothing or say something,” he said. “I chose to say something and I will never regret it.”

In 2021, Boutilier joined the Edmonton-based lobbying firm Alberta Counsel as a senior advisor. In October 2021, Mayor Don Scott of the Regional Municipality of Wood Buffalo awarded Boutilier and 12 other residents the Key to the Region.

== Death ==
Boutilier died on March 8, 2024, at the age of 65.

== Election results ==
1997 Alberta general election: Fort McMurray
| Party | Candidate | Votes | % | ±% |
|---|---|---|---|---|
| Progressive Conservative | Guy C. Boutilier | 5,420 | 55.83% | 28.57% |
| Liberal | John Vyboh | 4,008 | 41.29% | -1.13% |
| New Democratic | Rodney McCallum | 280 | 2.88% | -11.88% |
| Total | | 9,708 | – | – |
| Rejected, spoiled and declined | | 34 | – | – |
| Eligible electors / turnout | | 21,289 | 45.76% | – |
| Progressive Conservative gain from Liberal | | Swing | | -0.31% |
Source(s) Source: "Fort McMurray Official Results 1997 Alberta general election". Alberta Heritage Community Foundation.

2001 Alberta general election: Fort McMurray
| Party | Candidate | Votes | % | ±% |
|---|---|---|---|---|
| Progressive Conservative | Guy C. Boutilier | 5,914 | 64.49 | 8.66% |
| Liberal | John S. Vyboh | 1,759 | 19.18 | -22.11% |
| New Democratic | Lyn Gorman | 1,498 | 16.33 | 13.45% |
| Total | | 9,171 | 99.68 | – |
| Rejected, spoiled and declined | | 29 | 0.32 | – |
| Turnout | | 9,200 | 38.06 | |
| Eligible electors | | 24,170 | | |
| Progressive Conservative hold | | Swing | | 15.38% |
Source(s) Source: "Fort McMurray Official Results 2001 Alberta general election". Alberta Heritage Community Foundation."The Report of the Chief Electoral Office on the 2000 Provincial Confirmation Process and Monday, March 12, 2001 Provincial General Election of the Twenty-fifth Legislative Assembly" (PDF). Elections Alberta.

2004 Alberta general election: Fort McMurray-Wood Buffalo
| Party | Candidate | Votes | % | ±% |
|---|---|---|---|---|
| Progressive Conservative | Guy C. Boutilier | 4,433 | 63.19% | – |
| Liberal | Russell W. (Russ) Collicott | 1,802 | 25.69% | – |
| New Democratic | Dave Malka | 462 | 6.59% | – |
| Alberta Alliance | Eugene Eklund | 224 | 3.19% | – |
| Independent | Reginald (Reg) Normore | 94 | 1.34% | – |
| Total | | 7,015 | – | – |
| Rejected, spoiled and declined | | 12 | 41 | 1 |
| Eligible electors / turnout | | 26,618 | 26.40% | – |
| Progressive Conservative pickup new district. | | | | |
Source(s) Source: Alberta. Chief Electoral Officer (2005). Report of the Chief Electoral Officer on the General Enumeration and General Election of the Twenty-sixth Legislative Assembly (Report). Edmonton: Alberta Legislative Assembly, Office of the Chief Electoral Officer. pp. 302–305. "Fort McMurray-Wood Buffalo Statement of Official Results 2004 Alberta general election" (PDF). Elections Alberta.

2008 Alberta general election: Fort McMurray-Wood Buffalo
| Party | Candidate | Votes | % | ±% |
|---|---|---|---|---|
| Progressive Conservative | Guy C. Boutilier | 4,519 | 63.41 | +0.21 |
| Liberal | Ross Jacobs | 1,758 | 24.67 | -1.02 |
| New Democratic | Mel Kraley | 550 | 7.72 | +1.13 |
| Greens | Reginald (Reg) Normore | 300 | 4.21 | +2.87 |
| Total | | 7,127 | 99.62 | – |
| Rejected, spoiled and declined | | 27 | 0.38 | -0.39 |
| Turnout | | 7,154 | 19.84 | -6.71 |
| Eligible electors | | 36,054 | | |
| Progressive Conservative hold | | Swing | | +0.62 |
Source(s) Source: "54 - Fort McMurray-Wood Buffalo, 2008 Alberta general election". officialresults.elections.ab.ca. Elections Alberta. The Report on the March 3, 2008 Provincial General Election of the Twenty-seventh Legislative Assembly (PDF). Elections Alberta. pp. 414–417.

2012 Alberta general election: Fort McMurray-Wood Buffalo
| Party | Candidate | Votes | % | ±% |
|---|---|---|---|---|
| Progressive Conservative | Mike Allen | 3,609 | 48.99% | –14.42% |
| Wildrose Alliance | Guy C. Boutilier | 3,164 | 42.95% | – |
| New Democratic | Denise Woollard | 372 | 5.05% | –2.67% |
| Liberal | Amy McBain | 222 | 3.01% | –21.65% |
| Total | | 7,367 | – | – |
| Rejected, spoiled and declined | | 55 | 32 | 0 |
| Eligible electors / turnout | | 21,843 | 33.98% | +14.14% |
| Progressive Conservative hold | | Swing | | –16.35% |
Source(s) Source: "59 - Fort McMurray-Wood Buffalo, 2012 Alberta general election". officialresults.elections.ab.ca. Elections Alberta. Chief Electoral Officer (2012). The Report of the Chief Electoral Officer on the 2011 Provincial Enumeration and Monday, April 23, 2012 Provincial General Election of the Twenty-eighth Legislative Assembly (PDF) (Report). Edmonton, Alta.: Elections Alberta. pp. 352–355. Archived (PDF) from the original on May 6, 2021.
