= Mike Allen (Alberta politician) =

Canadian politician

Member of the Legislative Assembly of Alberta for Fort McMurray-Wood Buffalo
- In office April 23, 2012 – May 5, 2015
- Preceded by: Guy Boutilier
- Succeeded by: Tany Yao

Personal details
- Born: Michael Trent Allen; March 4, 1962 (age 64) Grande Prairie, Alberta
- Party: Alberta Party (?-present); Progressive Conservative (July 2014-July 2017); Independent (Aug 2013–June 2014); Progressive Conservative (May 2012–July 2013)
- Occupation: politician, musician, business owner

Michael Trent Allen (born March 4, 1962) is a Canadian politician who is a former elected member to the Legislative Assembly of Alberta representing the electoral district of Fort McMurray-Wood Buffalo. He is a former municipal and provincial politician, business owner and jazz musician.

== Political career ==
In 2007, Allen was elected to council for the Regional Municipality of Wood Buffalo. Allen finished one full three-year term as councillor and resigned during his second term to run in the 2012 Alberta general election as a Progressive Conservative candidate. He defeated incumbent Wildrose MLA Guy Boutilier.

Beginning in 2012, Allen served as a member of the Standing Committees for Private Bills, Resource Stewardship and Public Accounts. He was previously the chair of the Select Special Conflicts of Interest Act Review Committee. He had also served as a member of the Standing Committee on Families and Communities and the Standing Committee on Privileges and Elections, Standing Orders, and Printing. Allen also served as a member of Treasury Board and the Alaska-Alberta Bilateral Council.

In the 2015 Alberta general election, Allen was defeated by Wildrose candidate Tany Yao. Allen was re-elected to the Regional Municipality of Wood Buffalo's Municipal council during the 2017 Alberta municipal elections. He ran for mayor during the 2021 Alberta municipal elections but finished third.

Allen did not join the United Conservative Party following the merger of the Wildrose and PC Party, and is now a riding director with the Alberta Party.

=== Twinning of Highway 63 ===
Allen was appointed by Premier Alison Redford as the special advisor to the Minister of Transportation for Highway 63 on May 22, 2012.

His appointment was a result of a head-on collision between two vehicles that killed seven people, including two children, a pregnant woman and a Fort McMurray pastor. Twinning of the highway had begun in 2006 but only 16 kilometres had been completed at the time of the accident and 123 people had been killed on the road since 2000.

Allen's report was published on July 2, 2012 and included 22 suggestions for reducing reckless driving on the highway. The recommendations included the construction of more passing lanes and commercial rest areas, upgrades to Alberta Highway 881 to accommodate more traffic from Highway 63, improved police presence and stricter penalties for dangerous drivers.

Mayor Melissa Blake and Shayne Saskiw, the Wildrose MLA for Lac La Biche, criticized the report for not offering construction timelines for when construction could begin or how long building would take. Alberta Transportation Minister Ric McIver said twinning the highway at the time would cost $50 million per year and take eight to 11 years to complete if the province adopted a "pay-as-you-go" model. Fort McMurray residents also organized a protest in May 2012 demanding a timeline for when the highway would be twinned.

Allen and Don Scott, the PC MLA for Fort McMurray-Wood Buffalo, were able to push the Alberta government for a construction timeline later that year. In October 2012, the Alberta government announced twinning 240 kilometres of Highway 63 would begin immediately and be finished by 2016. The project was 99% finished during the 2016 Fort McMurray wildfire and the last completed section opened on May 28, 2016.

=== Air ambulance dispute ===
In 2009, Edmonton's city council voted to close the City Centre Airport, forcing the Alberta government to base air ambulance medical services for Northern Alberta out of Edmonton International Airport. That airport is located 20 kilometres south of Edmonton in Leduc County, and existing traffic conditions at the time meant ground ambulances would have an extra 18 minutes to 35 minutes to reach the University of Alberta Hospital and Royal Alexandra Hospital respectively.

Saskiw and more than 100 doctors argued the extra delay would be life threatening to patients being flown in from Northern Alberta during an emergency. Saskiw said the Alberta government should instead invest in improving health care in Northern Alberta and rely less on air ambulance services. The Wildrose also suggested the Alberta government expropriate the City Centre Airport.

A joint letter sent by Scott and Allen to Fort McMurray Today said expropriation was opposed by the Alberta Urban Municipalities Association and the Alberta Association of Municipal Districts and Counties. They also said there were questions about who would oversee the airport. The Alberta government stationed ground ambulances at a $6.5-million, 3,600-square-metre hangar with a six-patient care area at Edmonton International Airport for patients that are not time-sensitive.

== Sex worker scandal ==
Allen was representing Alberta at the Council of State Governments – Midwest meeting in Saint Paul, Minnesota when, on July 15, 2013, he was arrested in a prostitution sting operation.

The Human Trafficking Department of the St. Paul Police Department said Allen responded to an advertisement police posted on Backpage. Police say Allen asked an undercover officer for details about costs, time and the numbers of available women, then took a limo service to the motel where the sting was happening. When he arrived, Allen agreed while talking to an undercover officer that he would pay $200 for one hour of sex with two women while wearing a condom. Police say Allen was arrested after he placed the money on the counter and began undressing.

Allen was charged with one count of hiring or agreeing to hire a prostitute in a public place. He was offered a plea bargain that reduced the charge to a gross misdemeanor. Allen accepted the terms, plead guilty in December 2013, and paid a $500 fine plus legal fees. He also refunded the cost of the trip to the Alberta government, which was $2,061.44. Allen resigned from the PC caucus when he was released from police custody the next morning, and sat in the Alberta Legislature as an independent MLA.

In an interview with Fort McMurray Today, Allen said he responded to the advertisement because he felt lonely after a 26-year marriage ended in 2009 and a serious relationship ended several months before his arrest. Ironically, Allen once told a reporter from the Calgary Herald that police in Fort McMurray were not doing enough to stop sex workers from working outside his downtown music store.

Redford did not call for Allen's resignation, but said she was "shocked," "disappointed" and "disgusted" with "that MLA's conduct," and refused to mention Allen by name when she was asked about him by media. Wildrose Party leader Danielle Smith said Allen should resign so a by-election could be called. Alberta NDP Leader Brian Mason accused Redford of not wanting to risk losing Allen's seat to an opposition party, and argued it was hypocritical to condemn Allen and not demand his resignation.

Two advocacy groups for sex workers, the West Coast Cooperative of Sex Industry Professionals (WCCSIP) and the Canadian Adult Entertainment Council (CAEC), said in a joint October 2013 statement that they wanted Allen to continue serving as an MLA, and people "shouldn't judge a person's reasons for wanting intimacy.”

On July 7, 2014 at the party's annual Calgary Stampede meeting, the PC caucus voted in a closed ballot to invite Allen back into the PC caucus.

== Personal life ==
Allen is married. He has two children from his first marriage and three grandchildren. He moved to Fort McMurray in 1993 to take over a music store called Campbell's Music, which had opened in 1976. He served on the board for the Fort McMurray's Chamber of Commerce, and later served two terms as president. He also volunteered with the Fort McMurray SPCA and on the board of a homeless advocacy group in Fort McMurray called The Centre of Hope.

Campbell's Music closed in the summer of 2020. Allen blamed the closure of the store on the rising popularity of online shopping and the impacts on small businesses from the COVID-19 pandemic, a crash in world oil prices in 2014 and the 2016 Fort McMurray wildfire.

He also told Fort McMurray Today that rumours "fabricated for political reasons" in 2013 implied he influenced the outcome of a $3.36 million expropriation deal with the Regional Municipality of Wood Buffalo for financial gain. The deal involved several other properties in the same part of downtown to make way for a new arena and events centre.

Allen denied he had any influence with the expropriation process and he was cleared of any wrongdoing or conflict of interest by the Alberta government's ethics commissioner. The arena project was cancelled by municipal council in 2015. The location is now a park.

== Electoral history ==
2012 Alberta general election: Fort McMurray-Wood Buffalo
Party	Candidate	Votes	%	±%
Progressive Conservative	Mike Allen	3,609	48.99%	–14.42%
Wildrose Alliance	Guy C. Boutilier	3,164	42.95%	–
New Democratic	Denise Woollard	372	5.05%	–2.67%
Liberal	Amy McBain	222	3.01%	–21.65%
Total		7,367	–	–
Rejected, spoiled and declined		55	32	0
Eligible electors / turnout		21,843	33.98%	+14.14%
Progressive Conservative hold		Swing		–16.35%
Source(s) Source: "59 - Fort McMurray-Wood Buffalo, 2012 Alberta general election". officialresults.elections.ab.ca. Elections Alberta. Chief Electoral Officer (2012). The Report of the Chief Electoral Officer on the 2011 Provincial Enumeration and Monday, April 23, 2012 Provincial General Election of the Twenty-eighth Legislative Assembly (PDF) (Report). Edmonton, Alta.: Elections Alberta. pp. 352–355. Archived (PDF) from the original on May 6, 2021.

2015 Alberta general election: Fort McMurray-Wood Buffalo
Party	Candidate	Votes	%	±%
Wildrose	Tany Yao	3,835	40.03	-2.92
New Democratic	Stephen Drover	2,915	30.42	+25.37
Progressive Conservative	Mike Allen	2,486	25.95	-23.04
Liberal	Robin Le Fevre	345	3.60	+0.59
Total valid votes		9,581		
Rejected, spoiled and declined		76		
Eligible electors / Turnout		22,940	42.10	+7.97
Wildrose gain from Progressive Conservative		Swing		+10.06
Source(s) Elections Alberta. "Electoral Division Results: Fort McMurray-Wood Buffalo".
