= Adam Germain =

Canadian politician

Adam Germain is a former provincial level politician, lawyer and current Court of Queen's Bench Justice from Alberta, Canada. He served as a member of the Legislative Assembly of Alberta from 1993 to 1997.

== Political career ==
Germain was elected to the Alberta Legislature in the 1993 Alberta general election. He won the electoral district of Fort McMurray picking it up for the Liberals.

Germain did not run for a second term in provincial office, instead choosing to run in the 1997 Canadian federal election. He ran against incumbent Reform Member of Parliament David Chatters and finished a distant second taking 30% of the popular vote.

== Judicial career ==
After his provincial political career, Germain continued to work as a lawyer in Fort McMurray, Alberta and was later appointed as a justice of the Court of Queen's Bench of Alberta. In 2007 he was awarded the 2007 Faculty of Law Sessional Teaching Excellence Award by the University of Alberta.

He attracted attention from the national news in the case of Pastor Artur Pawlowski, anti-COVID measures activist and Christian preacher, convicted of contempt of court for breaching orders requiring them to follow COVID-19 public health rules. The judge sentenced the Pastor on October 13, 2021 to fines and community service.

In his judgment, the Judge also ordered the Pastor to speak in public the following:

"The final term of his probation order will be that when he is exercising his right of free speech ...in a public gathering or public forum (including electronic social media); he must indicate in his communications the following:

"I am also aware that the views I am expressing to you on this occasion may not be views held by the majority of medical experts in Alberta. While I may disagree with them, I am obliged to inform you that the majority of medical experts favour social distancing, mask wearing, and avoiding large crowds to reduce the spread of COVID-19. Most medical experts also support participation in a vaccination program unless for a valid religious or medical reason you cannot be vaccinated. Vaccinations have been shown statistically to save lives and to reduce the severity of COVID-19 symptoms."

Upon application on appeal on December 1, 2021, the Alberta Court of Appeal, disagreeing with Judge German, was satisfied that "the applicants have demonstrated that the qualified speech provisions and the travel restrictions arguably affect their mobility rights and rights to free expression guaranteed by the Charter of Rights and Freedoms." The court quickly granted a stay of "the qualified speech and travel restriction provisions of the order and direct the appeal proceed on an expedited basis."

Legislative Assembly of Alberta
Preceded by Norm Weiss	MLA Fort McMurray; 1993-1997	Succeeded by Guy Boutilier
