= Damase Bouvier =

Canadian politician (1929–1976)

Damase "Dan" David Bouvier

Member of the Legislative Assembly of Alberta
- In office August 20, 1968 – 1971
- Preceded by: Michael Maccagno
- Constituency: Lac La Biche
- In office 1971–1975
- Succeeded by: Ron Tesolin
- Constituency: Lac La Biche-McMurray

Personal details
- Born: March 27, 1929 Lac La Biche, Alberta
- Died: July 7, 1976 (aged 47)
- Party: Social Credit; Independent
- Occupation: politician

Damase "Dan" David Bouvier (March 27, 1929 – July 7, 1976) was a provincial level politician from Alberta, Canada. He served as a member of the Legislative Assembly of Alberta from 1968 to 1975 sitting with the Social Credit caucus in both government and opposition and also briefly as an Independent.
