= Doug Faulkner =

Canadian politician (1942–2024)

Mayor of Wood Buffalo, Alberta
- In office 1997–2004
- Preceded by: Guy Boutilier
- Succeeded by: Melissa Blake

Personal details
- Born: 1942 Inverness, Scotland
- Died: 17 July 2024 (aged 82)

Doug Faulkner (1942 – 17 July 2024) was a Canadian politician, who served as mayor of the Regional Municipality of Wood Buffalo, Alberta from 1997 to 2004.

Born in Scotland and raised in Bishops Falls, Newfoundland and Labrador, Faulkner worked in the materials and services department for Syncrude prior to his election as mayor.

Faulkner also ran for federal and provincial office. He ran as a Progressive Conservative candidate in Athabasca in the 2000 election, but switched his affiliation to the Liberal Party in the 2004 election following the merger of the Progressive Conservatives and the Canadian Alliance into the contemporary Conservative Party. In the 2012 provincial election in Alberta, he ran as a Wildrose Party candidate in the electoral district of Fort McMurray-Conklin. Faulkner died on 17 July 2024, at the age of 82.

== Electoral record ==
2000 Canadian federal election
| Party | Candidate | Votes | % | ±% | Expenditures |
|---|---|---|---|---|---|
| Alliance | David Chatters | 18,775 | 54.45 | -0.16 | $34,623 |
| Liberal | Harold Cardinal | 9,793 | 28.40 | -1.62 | $66,236 |
| Progressive Conservative | Doug Faulkner | 4,224 | 12.25 | +3.10 | $26,660 |
| New Democratic | Alysia Erickson | 872 | 2.52 | -2.17 | |
| Marijuana | Reginald Normore | 469 | 1.36 | – | |
| Green | Harvey Alex Scott | 345 | 1.00 | -0.50 | $194 |
| Total valid votes | | 34,478 | 100.00 | | |
| Total rejected ballots | | 104 | 0.30 | +0.03 | |
| Turnout | | 34,582 | 56.28 | +6.86 | |

2004 Canadian federal election
| Party | Candidate | Votes | % | ±% | Expenditures |
|---|---|---|---|---|---|
| Conservative | Brian Jean | 17,942 | 60.3 | -6.40 | $84,096 |
| Liberal | Doug Faulkner | 7,158 | 24.05 | -4.35 | $52,713 |
| New Democratic | Robert Cree | 3,115 | 10.46 | +7.94 | $4,942 |
| Green | Ian Hopfe | 1,542 | 5.18 | +4.18 | $112 |
| Total valid votes | | 29,757 | 100.00 | | |
| Total rejected ballots | | 112 | 0.37 | +0.07 | |
| Turnout | | 29,869 | 47.85 | -8.43 | |

2012 Alberta general election: Fort McMurray-Conklin
| Party | Candidate | Votes | % |
|---|---|---|---|
| Progressive Conservative | Don Scott | 2,588 | 48.95 |
| Wildrose | Doug Faulkner | 2,123 | 40.16 |
| New Democratic | Paul Pomerleau | 419 | 7.93 |
| Liberal | Ted Remenda | 157 | 2.97 |
| Total valid votes | | 5,287 | 99.17 |
| Rejected, spoiled and declined | | 44 | 0.83 |
| Turnout | | 5,331 | 36.30 |
| Eligible electors | | 14,686 | |
| Progressive Conservative pickup new district. | | | |
Source(s) Elections Alberta. "Election Results - Fort McMurray-Conklin". officialresults.elections.ab.ca/.
