= Ron Tesolin =

Canadian politician

Ronald "Ron" Joseph Tesolin

Member of the Legislative Assembly of Alberta
- In office 1975–1979
- Preceded by: Damase Bouvier
- Succeeded by: Norm Weiss
- Constituency: Lac La Biche-McMurray

Personal details
- Born: February 3, 1940 Lac La Biche, Alberta
- Died: November 13, 1986 (aged 46)
- Party: Progressive Conservative

Ronald "Ron" Joseph Tesolin (February 3, 1940 – November 13, 1986) was a provincial level politician from Alberta, Canada. He served as a member of the Legislative Assembly of Alberta from 1975 to 1979 sitting with the governing Progressive Conservative caucus.

== Political career ==
Tesolin ran for a seat to the Alberta Legislature in the 1975 Alberta general election. He won the electoral district of Lac La Biche-McMurray defeating four other candidates by a comfortable margin to pick up the district for the governing Progressive Conservative party. He retired from provincial politics at dissolution of the legislature in 1979.
