= Fort McMurray (electoral district) =

Defunct provincial electoral district in Alberta, Canada

Coordinates: 56°43′35″N 111°22′49″W

Alberta electoral district

Defunct provincial electoral district
- Legislature: Legislative Assembly of Alberta
- District created: 1986
- District abolished: 2003
- First contested: 1986
- Last contested: 2001

Fort McMurray was a provincial electoral district in Alberta, Canada, mandated to return a single member to the Legislative Assembly of Alberta using first-past-the-post balloting from 1986 to 2004.

== Boundary history ==
Members of the Legislative Assembly for Fort McMurray
Assembly	Years	Member	Party
See Lac La Biche-McMurray 1971-1986
21st	1986–1989	Norm Weiss	Progressive; Conservative
22nd	1989–1993	Norm Weiss	Progressive; Conservative
23rd	1993–1997	Adam Germain	Liberal
24th	1997–2001	Guy Boutilier	Progressive; Conservative
25th	2001–2004	Guy Boutilier	Progressive; Conservative
See Fort McMurray-Wood Buffalo 2004-present

The district was created for the 1986 election out of most of Lac La Biche-McMurray. Prior to the 1993 Alberta general election, the riding was re-defined as consisting of the city of Fort McMurray. Its boundaries remained unchanged even after Fort McMurray was folded into the Regional Municipality of Wood Buffalo in 1995.

The riding was abolished in 2004, when it was merged with a portion of Athabasca-Wabasca to form Fort McMurray-Wood Buffalo.

Fort McMurray 1985 boundaries
Bordering districts
North	East	West	South
N/A	Bonnyville	Barrhead, Lesser Slave Lake, Peace River	Redwater-Andrew, St. Paul, Westlock-Sturgeon
Legal description from Electoral Divisions Amendment Act, S.A. 1985, c. 24
"The boundary whereof is as follows: Commencing at the northeast corner of the Province; thence southerly along the east boundary of the Province to the north boundary of township 76; thence westerly along the said north boundary to the east boundary of range 22, west of the 4th meridian; thence northerly along the said east boundary to the south shore of Pelican Lake; thence in a general north-westerly and north-easterly direction along the shore of the westerly portion of the said Pelican Lake to the north boundary of township 78; thence westerly along the said north boundary to the east boundary of range 22, west of the 4th meridian; thence northerly along the east boundary of range 22, west of the 4th meridian to the north boundary of township 84; thence westerly along the said north boundary to the 5th meridian; thence northerly along the said 5th meridian to the north boundary of township 120; thence westerly along the said north boundary to the east boundary of range 10, west of the 5th meridian; thence northerly along the said east boundary to the north boundary of the Province; thence easterly along the said north boundary to the point of commencement."

== Representation history ==
The riding's first MLA was Norm Weiss, who had already served two terms in the abolished Lac La Biche-McMurray district for the Progressive Conservatives. He retired after serving two more terms. The open seat was picked up by Liberal candidate Adam Germain in 1993, coinciding with an increase in voter turnout. After serving one term, he decided to run in federal politics, leaving the seat open again.

The riding returned to the Progressive Conservatives in 1997, with candidate Guy Boutilier decisively defeating his Liberal challenger. He was re-elected with a much larger majority in 2001. When the riding was abolished at the end of his second term, he would continue on as MLA for the new riding of Fort McMurray-Wood Buffalo.

== Election results ==
=== 1986 ===
1986 Alberta general election: Fort McMurray
Party	Candidate	Votes	%	±%
Progressive Conservative	Norm Weiss	4,152	48.54%	–
New Democratic	Ann Dort MacLean	3,391	39.65%	–
Liberal	Shane Davis	1,010	11.81%	–
Total		8,553	–	–
Rejected, spoiled and declined		9	–	–
Eligible electors / turnout		22,467	38.11%	–
Progressive Conservative pickup new district.				
Source(s) Source: "Fort McMurray Official Results 1986 Alberta general election". Alberta Heritage Community Foundation.

=== 1989 ===
1989 Alberta general election: Fort McMurray
Party	Candidate	Votes	%	±%
Progressive Conservative	Norm Weiss	4,245	49.41%	0.87%
New Democratic	Ann Dort-MacLean	2,740	31.89%	-7.75%
Liberal	James Carbery	1,606	18.69%	6.89%
Total		8,591	–	–
Rejected, spoiled and declined		19	–	–
Eligible electors / turnout		20,385	42.24%	–
Progressive Conservative hold		Swing		4.31%
Source(s) Source: "Fort McMurray Official Results 1989 Alberta general election". Alberta Heritage Community Foundation.

=== 1993 ===
1993 Alberta general election: Fort McMurray
Party	Candidate	Votes	%	±%
Liberal	Adam Germain	4,261	42.42%	23.73%
Progressive Conservative	Connie MacRae	2,738	27.26%	-22.15%
Independent	Wendell MacEachern	1,563	15.56%	–
New Democratic	Ann Dort-MacLean	1,483	14.76%	-17.13%
Total		10,045	–	–
Rejected, spoiled, and declined		15	–	–
Eligible electors / turnout		20,583	48.88%	–
Liberal gain from Progressive Conservative		Swing		-1.18%
Source(s) Source: "Fort McMurray Official Results 1993 Alberta general election". Alberta Heritage Community Foundation.

=== 1997 ===
1997 Alberta general election: Fort McMurray
Party	Candidate	Votes	%	±%
Progressive Conservative	Guy C. Boutilier	5,420	55.83%	28.57%
Liberal	John Vyboh	4,008	41.29%	-1.13%
New Democratic	Rodney McCallum	280	2.88%	-11.88%
Total		9,708	–	–
Rejected, spoiled and declined		34	–	–
Eligible electors / turnout		21,289	45.76%	–
Progressive Conservative gain from Liberal		Swing		-0.31%
Source(s) Source: "Fort McMurray Official Results 1997 Alberta general election". Alberta Heritage Community Foundation.

=== 2001 ===
2001 Alberta general election: Fort McMurray
Party	Candidate	Votes	%	±%
Progressive Conservative	Guy C. Boutilier	5,914	64.49	8.66%
Liberal	John S. Vyboh	1,759	19.18	-22.11%
New Democratic	Lyn Gorman	1,498	16.33	13.45%
Total		9,171	99.68	–
Rejected, spoiled and declined		29	0.32	–
Turnout		9,200	38.06	
Eligible electors		24,170		
Progressive Conservative hold		Swing		15.38%
Source(s) Source: "Fort McMurray Official Results 2001 Alberta general election". Alberta Heritage Community Foundation."The Report of the Chief Electoral Office on the 2000 Provincial Confirmation Process and Monday, March 12, 2001 Provincial General Election of the Twenty-fifth Legislative Assembly" (PDF). Elections Alberta.

== See also ==
- List of Alberta provincial electoral districts
- Canadian provincial electoral districts
