= Norm Weiss =

Canadian politician

Norman "Norm" A. Weiss

Member of the Legislative Assembly of Alberta for Fort McMurray Lac La Biche-McMurray (1979-1986)
- In office March 14, 1979 – June 14, 1993
- Preceded by: Ron Tesolin
- Succeeded by: Adam Germain

Minister of Recreation and Parks
- In office May 26, 1986 – April 13, 1989
- Preceded by: Peter Trynchy
- Succeeded by: Steve West

Career Development and Employment
- In office September 18, 1989 – December 14, 1992
- Preceded by: Ken Kowalski
- Succeeded by: Portfolio Abolished

Personal details
- Born: December 23, 1935 Edmonton, Alberta
- Died: June 2, 2015 (aged 79) Courtenay, British Columbia
- Party: Progressive Conservative
- Spouse: Carol Elaine Dittberner

Norman "Norm" Allen Weiss (December 23, 1935 – June 2, 2015) was a provincial level politician from Alberta, Canada. He served as a member of the Legislative Assembly of Alberta from 1979 to 1993 sitting with the governing Progressive Conservative caucus. During his time in office he served a couple different cabinet portfolios under the government of Don Getty.

== Early life ==
Norman Allen Weiss was born December 23, 1935, in Edmonton, Alberta to Alfred William Weiss and Matilda Steltter. He attended Victoria Composite High School, and married Carol Elaine Dittberner on June 15, 1961, with which he had two daughters. Weiss would work for Shell Canada as the Western Marketing Manager and transfer to Vancouver, British Columbia, and later transfer to Fort McMurray, Alberta to operate a Shell bulk plant and Ski-Doo dealership. During his time in Fort McMurray, Weiss would serve as the vice-chair of the Fort McMurray Chamber of Commerce, a member of the Kinsmen Club, Rotary Club and Muffalloose Trailblazers.

== Political career ==
Weiss ran for a seat to the Alberta Legislature as a candidate for the governing Progressive Conservative party in the 1979 Alberta general election. He won the election to hold the Lac La Biche-McMurray electoral district for his party. He won over half the popular vote, easily defeating three other candidates.

Weiss stood for re-election in the 1982 Alberta general election. He won a super majority defeating three other candidates in his bid for a second term in office.

Lac La Biche-McMurray was abolished due to redistribution in 1986. Weiss ran for a third term in office in the new Fort McMurray electoral district for the 1986 general election. He won the new district in a tight race with NDP candidate Ann Dort Maclean finishing just over 700 votes ahead in the polling. After the election Premier Don Getty appointed Weiss to the Executive Council of Alberta to serve as Minister of Recreation and Parks.

Weiss ran for his fourth term in office in the 1989 Alberta general election this time with ministerial advantage. He once again faced Maclean and held his seat, because her plurality dropped while his went up marginally. After the election Getty made Weiss the new Minister of Career Development and Employment. He held that portfolio until Ralph Klein became Premier in 1992. Weiss retired from the assembly at dissolution in 1993.

== Later life ==
Following his retirement from politics, Weiss moved to Courtenay, British Columbia. Weiss was awarded the Queen's Diamond Jubilee Medal in 2012.

Weiss died on June 2, 2015, in Courtenay, British Columbia. He had Parkinson's disease, Lewy Body Dementia and throat cancer.
