= Don Scott (Alberta politician) =

Canadian politician

The Honourable Don Scott ECA KC
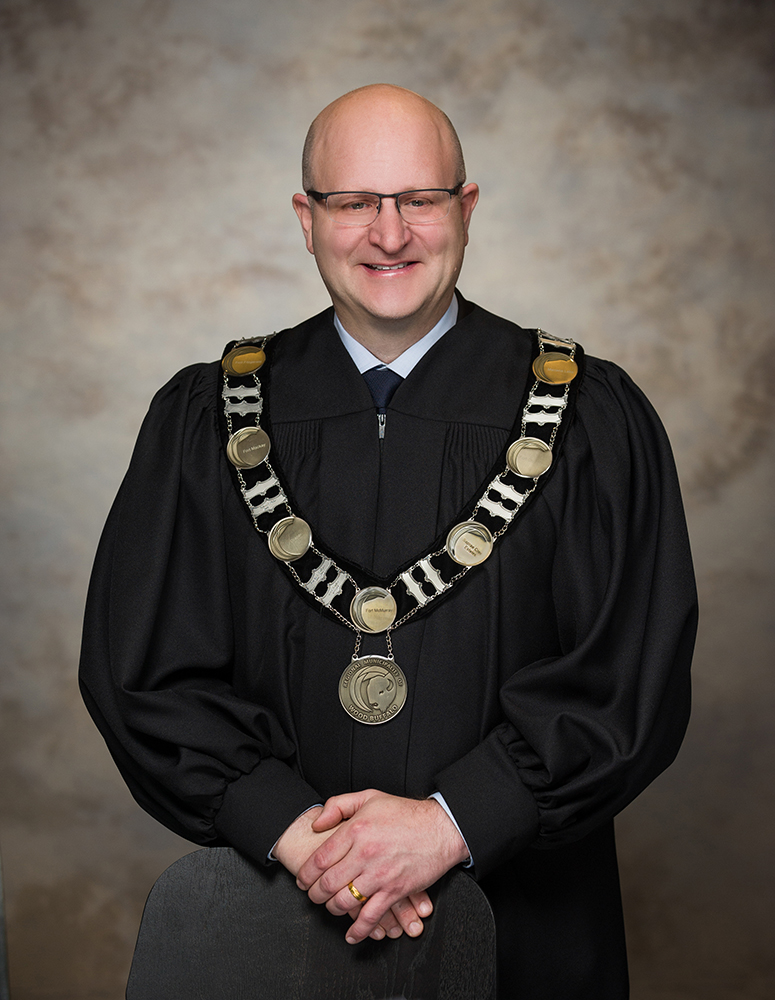
- Don Scott in 2017

Mayor of Wood Buffalo
- In office 2017–2021
- Preceded by: Melissa Blake
- Succeeded by: Sandy Bowman

MLA for Fort McMurray-Conklin
- In office 2012–2015
- Preceded by: new district
- Succeeded by: Brian Jean

Personal details
- Born: 1966 or 1967 (age 59–60)
- Party: Progressive Conservative
- Spouse: Janey
- Children: 2 daughters
- Education: University of New Brunswick; University of Cambridge
- Occupation: lawyer

Keith Donald Charles Scott ECA KC (born c. 1966) is a Canadian lawyer and former politician who served as the mayor of the Regional Municipality of Wood Buffalo, and as an MLA and Cabinet minister for the Progressive Conservative Party of Alberta. He currently works for the Métis Nation of Alberta as an executive director.

== Municipal councillor ==
Scott was elected as a Ward 1 councillor for the Regional Municipality of Wood Buffalo during the October 2010 election, and was one of six councillors representing Fort McMurray. During his term he also sat on the board for the Wood Buffalo Housing and Development Corporation (WBEDC), a subsidized housing organization in Fort McMurray.

== Provincial politics ==
=== 2012 Alberta general election ===
On November 30, 2011, Scott announced he was running to be the MLA candidate with the Progressive Conservative party for the 2012 Alberta general election. He was named the party's candidate in Fort McMurray-Conklin on January 17, 2012.

Scott's main opponent was Wildrose candidate Doug Faulkner, who was mayor of the RMWB between 1997 and 2004. Scott won the election with 48.95 per cent of the vote. After his victory, Scott resigned his council seat.

=== Twinning of Highway 63 ===
On April 27, 2012, a head-on collision between two vehicles that killed seven people—including two children, a pregnant woman and a Fort McMurray pastor—happened on Highway 63 south of Fort McMurray near Wandering River.

The fatal collision was a breaking point for the community and triggered protests from the public and calls for action from the RMWB's municipal council. Twinning of 240 kilometres of the highway between Fort McMurray and Atmore began in 2006 and was supposed to be finished by 2012. Only 16 kilometres had been completed at the time of the accident and 123 people had been killed on the road since 2000.

Scott and Mike Allen, PC MLA for Fort McMurray-Wood Buffalo, promised completing the twinning of Highway 63 would be a top priority for them.

In October 2012, the Alberta government announced that twinning 240 kilometres of Highway 63 would begin immediately and be finished by 2016. The project was 99% finished during the 2016 Fort McMurray wildfire and the last completed section opened on May 28, 2016.

=== Air ambulance dispute ===
In 2009, Edmonton's city council voted to close the City Centre Airport, forcing the Alberta government to base air ambulance medical services for Northern Alberta out of Edmonton International Airport. That airport is located 20 kilometres south of Edmonton in Leduc County, and existing traffic conditions at the time meant ground ambulances would have an extra 18 minutes to 35 minutes to reach the University of Alberta Hospital and Royal Alexandra Hospital respectively.

Shayne Saskiw, the Wildrose MLA for Lac La Biche- St. Paul -Two Hills, and more than 100 doctors argued the extra delay would be life-threatening to patients being flown in from Northern Alberta during an emergency. Saskiw said the Alberta government should instead invest in improving health care in Northern Alberta and rely less on air ambulance services. The Wildrose also suggested the Alberta government expropriate the City Centre Airport.

A joint letter sent by Scott and Allen to Fort McMurray Today said expropriation was opposed by the Alberta Urban Municipalities Association and the Alberta Association of Municipal Districts and Counties. They also said there were questions about who would oversee the airport. The Alberta government stationed ground ambulances at a $6.5-million, 3,600-square-metre hangar with a six-patient care area at the airport for patients that are not time-sensitive.

=== Infrastructure and land releases for Fort McMurray ===
Scott's term as MLA coincided with large growth in the Athabasca oil sands and a booming population in Fort McMurray. In 2011, the RMWB's municipal council predicted that the municipality's population would exceed 231,000 residents by 2030, with more than 196,000 residents predicted to be living in Fort McMurray.

On January 25, 2013, the Alberta government released 55,000 acres of Crown land to the municipality for development. The land included stretches west of the Timberlea neighbourhood, across the Clearwater River, and south of Abasand and Beacon Hill. The land was scheduled to be sold to the RMWB in phases over a five to 15-year period, effectively doubling the size of Fort McMurray by 2030.

Scott and Mayor Melissa Blake said securing the land for development was a major achievement for accommodating the growing population at the time. A global crash in oil prices in 2014 slowed Fort McMurray's rapid growth. Development of the parcels did not proceed.

Scott also oversaw the construction of new schools and renovations of existing schools in Fort McMurray, and an expansion of Fort McMurray's Northern Lights Regional Health Centre and construction of a helicopter landing pad.

=== Associate Minister of Accountability, Transparency & Transformation ===
Scott was named Associate Minister of Accountability, Transparency & Transformation by Premier Alison Redford on May 9, 2012. In September 2012, Scott told the Calgary Herald he was supporting the creation of a whistleblower policy for the Alberta legislature. The Public Interest Disclosure (Whistleblower Protection) Act was passed later that fall and came into effect on June 1, 2013.

Scott also oversaw the release of Alberta's first Sunshine list on January 31, 2014. The list included compensation details for 3,100 government employees who made more than $100,000 in 2012 and 2013.

=== Minister of Innovation and Advanced Education ===
Scott was appointed Minister of Innovation and Advanced Education by Premier Jim Prentice on September 15, 2014 and held the position until the 2015 Alberta general election.

In November 2014, Scott approved tuition increases to 25 postsecondary programs in Alberta. Scott said the hikes were needed to bring tuition in line with other programs found in Alberta and other provinces. Scott said the changes would provide $21 million in additional revenue for Alberta's postsecondary schools, and affect 8% of students in 1% of programs. Scott also wanted institutions to cut programs with low enrolment figures.

In March 2015, Prentice told universities and colleges they would face up to $114 million in cuts in provincial operating grants during a two-year period, and some of the cuts would be permanent. Prentice and Scott said this was to bring Alberta in line with spending in other provinces, and postsecondary schools would need to find new revenue sources to make up for the shortfall. Scott said funding available for student loans would increase to offset any increases in costs to students.

The market modifiers and funding cuts to postsecondary institutions were cancelled after the election of Premier Rachel Notley on May 5, 2015.

In April 2015, Scott was criticized for cancelling a program that gave a $500 grant to any child in Alberta who opened a Registered Education Savings Plan. The program was introduced in 2005 by Premier Ralph Klein, and nearly 400,000 grants worth $132 million had been paid up until December 31, 2014. Scott said the program's use had been declining, and that the funding would instead be best used for low-income students.

=== 2015 Alberta general election ===
On April 7, 2015, Premier Jim Prentice called a snap election for May 5, 2015. Scott's main opponent in the Fort McMurray-Conklin riding was Brian Jean, a former Conservative Party of Canada MP for Fort McMurray-Athabasca who had become leader of the Wildrose Party.

During the campaign, Scott claimed his term brought an "unprecedented amount of investment and innovation" into the region and called Jean's career as an MP "the lost decade for this region." Scott said Jean was incompetent and criticized Jean for resigning as an MP in January 2014. Both Jean and Scott blamed each other for delays in the construction of a long-term care centre and the twinning of Highway 63.

Allen and Scott said twinning Highway 63 was a complicated engineering project when it was announced in 2006, and blamed federal and provincial environmental caveats for the delays. Allen accused Jean of failing to get federal caveats removed.

Jean responded that the federal government was prepared to fund 50% of twinning Highway 63 in 2006 when it was $300 million. Jean said he frequently brought Fort McMurray's health care and infrastructure concerns to the federal government.

Jean won the 2015 election and the Wildrose would go on to form the Official Opposition against Premier Rachel Notley. Scott finishing third in the riding. NDP candidate Ariana Mancini, a Fort McMurray public school teacher, finished second.

== Mayor of the Regional Municipality of Wood Buffalo ==
Scott was elected mayor of Wood Buffalo in 2017 after Melissa Blake decided to retire from politics. He did not run for re-election in 2021.

== Controversies ==
=== Travel expenses as an MLA ===
During the 2015 Alberta general election, Scott was criticized by Brian Jean, Wildrose leader and Scott's main candidate, for attending the International Conference of Data Protection and Privacy Commissioners in Warsaw, Poland in September 2013.

Scott and his assistant expensed $24,100 for the five-day trip. Scott defended the trip's cost, arguing it is standard for a minister to bring assistants on trips requiring meeting foreign dignitaries. Scott said the cost was standard for a minister and assistant traveling to a foreign country who were also expected to meet with foreign dignitaries.

Jean also criticized Scott for spending $59,247 on travel for the fiscal year that ended in March 2014. Scott defended this cost by arguing it was expensive to travel between Edmonton and Fort McMurray, Anzac, Conklin, Fort Chipewyan and Janvier.

== Post-politics ==
Scott is currently the executive director for the McMurray Métis, a Métis Local in Fort McMurray that is part of the Métis Nation of Alberta. Scott is also a partner with McMurray Regional Law Office, a law firm he founded that was formerly called Don Scott McMurray Law Office. While Scott is still a partner, he is not currently practicing law.

== Personal life ==
Scott resides in Fort McMurray. He has two daughters with his wife, Janey, a local music teacher. He is a volunteer with United Way. He is an avid badminton and basketball player, and his law firm sponsors a badminton court at Shell Place.

As a law student at the University of Cambridge, Scott was part of the Bloody Sunday inquiry. Along with 100 members of the Alberta Bar, he was appointed to Queen's Counsel on January 4, 2012.

== Electoral history ==
2012 Alberta general election: Fort McMurray-Conklin
Party	Candidate	Votes	%
Progressive Conservative	Don Scott	2,588	48.95
Wildrose	Doug Faulkner	2,123	40.16
New Democratic	Paul Pomerleau	419	7.93
Liberal	Ted Remenda	157	2.97
Total valid votes		5,287	99.17
Rejected, spoiled and declined		44	0.83
Turnout		5,331	36.30
Eligible electors		14,686	
Progressive Conservative pickup new district.			
Source(s) Elections Alberta. "Election Results - Fort McMurray-Conklin". officialresults.elections.ab.ca/.

2015 Alberta general election: Fort McMurray-Conklin
Party	Candidate	Votes	%	±%
Wildrose	Brian Jean	2,950	43.85	+3.70
New Democratic	Ariana Mancini	2,071	30.79	+22.86
Progressive Conservative	Don Scott	1,502	22.33	−26.62
Liberal	Melinda Hollis	204	3.03	+0.06
Total valid votes		6,727	99.10	–
Rejected, spoiled and declined		61	0.90	+0.07
Turnout		6,788	44.45	+8.15
Eligible electors		15,272		
Wildrose gain from Progressive Conservative		Swing		+15.16
Source(s) Elections Alberta. "Election Results - Fort McMurray-Conklin".

Wood Buffalo mayoral election, October 16, 2017
Candidate	Vote	%
Don Scott	8,911	68.65
Allan Grandison	3,160	24.35
Tony Needham	650	5.01
Allan Glenn Vinni	259	2.00
