= Lac La Biche-McMurray =

Defunct provincial electoral district in Alberta, Canada

Alberta electoral district

Defunct provincial electoral district
- Legislature: Legislative Assembly of Alberta
- District created: 1971
- District abolished: 1986
- First contested: 1971
- Last contested: 1982

Lac La Biche-McMurray was a provincial electoral district in Alberta, Canada, mandated to return a single member to the Legislative Assembly of Alberta using first-past-the-post balloting from 1971 to 1986.

It replaced the district of Lac La Biche with minimal boundary changes in 1971, and when abolished in 1986, was replaced by Athabasca-Lac La Biche and Fort McMurray. It differed from the current Fort McMurray-Lac La Biche riding in that it included the entire city of Fort McMurray.

== Representation history ==
Members of the Legislative Assembly for Lac La Biche-McMurray
Assembly	Years	Member	Party
See Lac La Biche 1952-1971
17th	1971–1972	Damase; Bouvier	Social Credit
17th	1972–1975	Damase; Bouvier	Independent
18th	1975–1979	Ron Tesolin	Progressive; Conservative
19th	1979–1982	Norm Weiss	Progressive; Conservative
20th	1982–1986	Norm Weiss	Progressive; Conservative
See Fort McMurray 1986–2004 and Athabasca- Lac La Biche 1986–1993

The riding's first MLA was Dan Bouvier, newly-minted member for Lac La Biche. Elected under the Social Credit banner, he resigned from caucus a year later "in the interest of [his] constituents". He did not run again in the 1975 election.

The riding was then picked up by the governing Progressive Conservatives, with Ron Tesolin winning by a large margin over four rivals. He served only one term as MLA, but Norm Weiss held the riding for the PCs for two more terms.

Lac La Biche-McMurray was then abolished for the 1986 election and replaced with Fort McMurray, where Weiss would go on to serve two more terms, and Athabasca-Lac La Biche, which would be picked up by the New Democrats.

=== Boundary history ===
Lac La Biche-McMurray 1970 boundaries
Bordering districts
North	East	West	South
N/A	N/A	Lesser Slave Lake, Peace River, Athabasca	Redwater-Andrew, St. Paul, Bonnyville
Legal description from The Legislative Assembly Act, S.A. 1970, c. 34
"The boundary whereof is as follows: Commencing at the north-east corner of the Province; thence southerly along the east boundary of the Province to the north boundary of township 72; thence westerly along the said north boundary to the east boundary of range 9, west of the 4th meridian; thence southerly along the said east boundary to the north boundary of township 63; thence westerly along the said north boundary to the east boundary of range 10, west of the 4th meridian; thence southerly along the said east boundary to the left bank of the Beaver River; thence upstream along the said left bank to the north boundary of section 32 in township 62, range 10, west of the 4th meridian; thence westerly along the north boundary of township 62 to the east boundary of range 14, west of the 4th meridian; thence southerly along the said east boundary to the north boundary of township 61; thence westerly along the said north boundary to the east boundary of range 18, west of the 4th meridian; thence northerly along the said east boundary to the north boundary of township 76; thence westerly along the said north boundary to the east boundary of range 22, west of the 4th meridian; thence northerly along the said east boundary to the south shore of Pelican Lake; thence in a general northwesterly and north-easterly direction along the shore of the westerly portion of the said Pelican Lake to the north boundary of township 78; thence westerly along the said north boundary to the east boundary of township 79, range 22, west of the 4th meridian; thence northerly along the east boundary of range 22, west of the 4th meridian to the north boundary of township 84; thence westerly along the said north boundary to the 5th meridian; thence northerly along the said 5th meridian to the north boundary of township 120; thence westerly along the said north boundary to the east boundary of range 10, west of the 5th meridian; thence northerly along the said east boundary to the north boundary of the Province; thence easterly along the said north boundary to the point of commencement."
Note:

Lac La Biche-McMurray 1977 boundaries
Bordering districts
North	East	West	South
N/A	N/A	Lesser Slave Lake, Peace River, Athabasca	Redwater-Andrew, St. Paul, Bonnyville
Legal description from The Legislative Assembly Act, S.A. 1977, c. 28
"—The boundary whereof is as follows: Commencing at the north-east corner of the Province; thence southerly along the east boundary of the Province to the north boundary of township 72; thence westerly along the said north boundary to the east boundary of range 9, west of the 4th meridian; thence southerly along the said east boundary to the north boundary of township 63; thence westerly along the said north boundary to the east boundary of range 10, west of the 4th meridian; thence southerly along the said east boundary to the left bank of the Beaver River; thence upstream along the said left bank to the north boundary of section 32 in township 62, range 10, west of the 4th meridian; thence westerly along the north boundary of township 62 to the east boundary of range 14, west of the 4th meridian; thence southerly along the said east boundary to the north boundary of township 61; thence westerly along the said north boundary to the east boundary of range 18, west of the 4th meridian; thence northerly along the said east boundary to the north boundary of township 76; thence westerly along the said north boundary to the east boundary of range 22, west of the 4th meridian; thence northerly along the said east boundary to the south shore of Pelican Lake; thence in a general northwesterly And north-easterly direction along the shore of the westerly portion of the said Pelican Lake to the north boundary of township 78; thence westerly along the said north boundary to the east boundary of township 79, range 22, west of the 4th meridian; thence northerly along the east boundary of range 22, west of the 4th meridian to the north boundary of township 84; thence westerly along the said north boundary to the 5th meridian; thence northerly along the said 5th meridian to the north boundary of township 120; thence westerly along the said north boundary to the east boundary of range 10, west of the 5th meridian; thence northerly along the said east boundary to the north boundary of the Province; thence easterly along the said north boundary to the point of commencement."

== Electoral results ==
=== 1971 ===
1971 Alberta general election
Party	Candidate	Votes	%	±%
Social Credit	Damase Bouvier	2,679	53.37%	-3.50%
Progressive Conservative	Elmer Roy	1,927	38.39%	+12.93%
New Democratic	Kenneth Orchard	414	8.25%	+4.01%
Total valid votes		5,020	–	–
Rejected, spoiled, and declined		38	–	–
Electors / turnout		8,198	61.70%	–
Social Credit notional hold		Swing		-8.22%
Source(s) Source: "Lac La Biche-McMurray Official Results 1971 Alberta general election". Alberta Heritage Community Foundation.

=== 1975 ===
1975 Alberta general election
Party	Candidate	Votes	%	±%
Progressive Conservative	Ron Tesolin	2,859	53.05%	+14.66%
Independent	Mike Chandi	737	13.68%	–
Liberal	Jean Davidson	703	13.05%	–
Social Credit	Ken Cochrane	560	10.39%	-42.98%
New Democratic	Ronald Morgan	530	9.83%	+1.59%
Total valid votes		5,389	–	–
Rejected, spoiled, and declined		38	–	–
Electors / turnout		9,842	55.14%	-6.56%
Progressive Conservative gain from Independent		Swing		+0.49%
Source(s) Source: "Lac La Biche-McMurray Official Results 1975 Alberta general election". Alberta Heritage Community Foundation.

=== 1979 ===
In the late 70's, the population of Lac La Biche-McMurray inflated alongside the economic boom in the Athabasca oil sands, seen in the near-doubling of eligible electors for the 1979 election.

1979 Alberta general election
Party	Candidate	Votes	%	±%
Progressive Conservative	Norm Weiss	3,431	49.91%	-3.14%
New Democratic	Claire Williscroft	1,777	25.85%	+16.02%
Social Credit	Conrad Sehn	1,347	19.59%	+9.20%
Liberal	Denise Diesel	320	4.65%	-8.40%
Total valid votes		6,875	–	–
Rejected, spoiled, and declined		31	–	–
Electors / turnout		17,015	40.59%	-14.55%
Progressive Conservative hold		Swing		-9.58%
Source(s) Source: "Lac La Biche-McMurray Official Results 1979 Alberta general election". Alberta Heritage Community Foundation.

=== 1982 ===
1982 Alberta general election
Party	Candidate	Votes	%	±%
Progressive Conservative	Norm Weiss	6,844	57.37%	+7.46%
New Democratic	Dermond Travis	3,481	29.18%	+3.33%
Western Canada Concept	Jim Williams	1,021	8.59%	–
Liberal	Roland Woodward	584	4.90%	+0.25%
Total valid votes		11,930	–	–
Rejected, spoiled, and declined		133	–	–
Electors / turnout		23,569	51.18%	+10.59%
Progressive Conservative hold		Swing		+2.07%
Source(s) Source: "Lac La Biche-McMurray Official Results 1982 Alberta general election". Alberta Heritage Community Foundation.

== See also ==
- List of Alberta provincial electoral districts
- Canadian provincial electoral districts
