= Fort McMurray-Wood Buffalo =

Provincial electoral district in Alberta, Canada

Alberta electoral district
- Fort McMurray-Wood Buffalo within Alberta, 2017 boundaries

Provincial electoral district
- Legislature: Legislative Assembly of Alberta
MLA
Tany Yao
United Conservative
- District created: 2003
- First contested: 2004
- Last contested: 2023

Fort McMurray-Wood Buffalo is a provincial electoral district in Alberta, Canada. The district is one of 87 districts mandated to return a single member (MLA) to the Legislative Assembly of Alberta using the first past the post method of voting.

The district had in recent years been favourable to the election of Progressive Conservative candidates, a trend broken when Tany Yao won it for the Wildrose. Yao joined the United Conservative Party when the Wildrose merged with the PCs.

== Geography ==
Fort McMurray-Wood Buffalo is a largely rural riding in the northeast corner of Alberta. Municipally, the riding consists of the northern part of the Regional Municipality of Wood Buffalo and almost all of Improvement District No. 24. The riding is home to the bulk of industrial activity relating to the Athabasca oil sands.

The major urban centre in the region, Fort McMurray, is split between this riding and Fort McMurray-Lac La Biche, with the northern neighbourhood of Timberlea falling within the boundaries of Fort McMurray-Wood Buffalo. Other communities in the riding include the hamlets of Fort Chipewyan, Fort Fitzgerald, and Fort McKay.

Three First Nation band governments are based in Fort McMurray-Wood Buffalo: Athabasca Chipewyan First Nation, Fort McKay First Nation, and Mikisew Cree First Nation. Smith's Landing First Nation is based outside of the riding but has several reserves within its boundaries. All of these bands are signatories of Treaty 8.

In addition to Fort McMurray-Lac La Biche to the south, Fort McMurray-Wood Buffalo also borders the riding of Lesser Slave Lake to the southwest, the riding of Peace River to the west, the Northwest Territories to the north, and the province of Saskatchewan to the east.

== History ==
The electoral district was created in the 2004 electoral boundary re-distribution by merging the electoral district of Fort McMurray with a portion of Athabasca-Wabasca residing in the Municipal district of Wood Buffalo.

The decade that went by since the district was created saw significant population growth due to exploration and development of the oil sands. The 2010 electoral boundary re-distribution resulted in the splitting of the district in two along north south lines creating Fort McMurray-Conklin in the eastern half.

=== Boundary history ===
54 Fort McMurray-Wood Buffalo 2003 boundaries
Bordering districts
North	East	West	South
none	none	Lesser Slave Lake, Peace River	Lac La Biche-St. Paul
riding map goes here			
Legal description from the Statutes of Alberta 2003, Electoral Divisions Act.
Starting at the intersection of the east boundary of Rge. 10 W5 and the north boundary of the Province; then 1. east along the north boundary of the Province to the east boundary of the Province; 2. south along the east boundary of the Province to the north boundary of Twp. 73, Rge. 1 W4 (north boundary of the Cold Lake Air Weapons Range [CLAWR]); 3. west along the north boundary of the CLAWR to the east boundary of Sec. 21, Twp. 73, Rge. 9 W4; 4. north along the east boundary of Secs. 21, 28 and 33 in the Twp. and Secs. 4, 9, 16, 21, 28 and 33 in Twp. 74, Rge. 9 W4 to the north boundary of Twp. 74; 5. west along the north boundary of Twp. 74 to the east boundary of Rge. 10; 6. north along the east boundary of Rge. 10 to the north boundary of Twp. 80; 7. west along the north boundary of Twp. 80 to the east boundary of Rge. 13 W4; 8. south along the east boundary of Rge. 13 to the north boundary of Sec. 13 in the Twp.; 9. west along the north boundary of Secs. 13, 14, 15, 16, 17 and 18 in the Twp. to the east boundary of Rge. 14 W4; 10. north along the east boundary of Rge. 14 to the north boundary of Twp. 80; 11. west along the Twp. to the intersection with the right bank of the Athabasca River; 12. downstream along the right bank of the Athabasca River to the intersection with the east boundary of Rge. 18 W4 in Twp. 86; 13. north along the east boundary of Rge. 18 to the north boundary of Twp. 95; 14. west along the north boundary of Twp. 95 to the east boundary of Rge. 20 W4; 15. north along the east boundary of Rge. 20 to the north boundary of Twp. 96; 16. west along the north boundary of Twp. 96 to the 5th meridian; 17. north along the 5th meridian to the north boundary of Twp. 111; 18. east along the north boundary of Twp. 111 to the east boundary of Rge. 23 W4; 19. north along the east boundary of Rge. 23 to the north boundary of Twp. 112; 20. west along the north boundary of Twp. 112 to the 5th meridian (Wood Buffalo National Park boundary); 21. north, west and north along the park boundary to the starting point.
Note:

59 Fort McMurray-Wood Buffalo 2010 boundaries
Bordering districts
North	East	West	South
Northwest Territories boundary	Fort McMurray-Conklin	Lesser Slave Lake and Peace River	Fort McMurray-Conklin
Legal description from the Statutes of Alberta 2010, Electoral Divisions Act.
Note: Boundary descriptions were not used in the 2010 redistribution

=== Representation history ===
Members of the Legislative Assembly for Fort McMurray-Wood Buffalo
Assembly	Years	Member	Party
See Athabasca-Wabasca 1993–2004, Fort McMurray, 1986–2004 and Lesser Slave Lake 1971–2004
26th	2004–2008	Guy Boutilier	Progressive Conservative
27th	2008–2009	Guy Boutilier	Progressive Conservative
27th	2009–2010	Guy Boutilier	Independent
27th	2010	Guy Boutilier	Independent Wildrose Alliance
27th	2010–2011	Guy Boutilier	Wildrose Alliance
27th	2011–2012	Guy Boutilier	Wildrose
28th	2012–2013	Mike Allen	Progressive Conservative
28th	2013–2014	Mike Allen	Independent
28th	2014–2015	Mike Allen	Progressive Conservative
29th	2015–2017	Tany Yao	Wildrose
29th	2017–2019	Tany Yao	United Conservative
30th	2019–2023	Tany Yao	United Conservative
31st	2023–	Tany Yao	United Conservative

The electoral district was created in the 2003 boundary redistribution. The first election held that year saw Fort McMurray incumbent Progressive Conservative MLA Guy Boutilier win the new seat with a landslide over four other candidates to pick it up for his party.

Boutilier was appointed as Minister of Environment by Premier Ralph Klein in 2004. In 2006 he was shuffled to Minister of International Relations. He ran for a second term as a cabinet minister in the 2008 general election. That election saw him win another big majority.

On July 18, 2009, Boutilier was ejected from caucus by Premier Ed Stelmach after speaking out against the government over a broken promise to put a seniors care facility in Fort McMurray. He sat as an independent until joining the Wildrose Alliance caucus as an independent member on June 24, 2010. On October 25, 2010, he became a full member of the caucus.

However, Boutilier was defeated in 2012 by PC Mike Allen. Allen was also ejected from PC caucus in 2013 after being caught in a prostitution sting while on an official trip to Minnesota, but was readmitted to caucus in 2014.

In the 2015 election, Allen was defeated by Wildrose candidate Tany Yao. When the Wildrose and PC parties merged in 2017, Yao joined the new United Conservative Party along with the rest of the Wildrose caucus.

Yao running as a member of the United Conservative Party would once again defeat NDP candidate Stephen Drover in the 2019 general election by a healthy margin of 7,140 votes.

== Legislative election results ==
=== 2004 ===
2004 Alberta general election
Party	Candidate	Votes	%	±%
Progressive Conservative	Guy C. Boutilier	4,433	63.19%	–
Liberal	Russell W. (Russ) Collicott	1,802	25.69%	–
New Democratic	Dave Malka	462	6.59%	–
Alberta Alliance	Eugene Eklund	224	3.19%	–
Independent	Reginald (Reg) Normore	94	1.34%	–
Total		7,015	–	–
Rejected, spoiled and declined		12	41	1
Eligible electors / turnout		26,618	26.40%	–
Progressive Conservative pickup new district.				
Source(s) Source: Alberta. Chief Electoral Officer (2005). Report of the Chief Electoral Officer on the General Enumeration and General Election of the Twenty-sixth Legislative Assembly (Report). Edmonton: Alberta Legislative Assembly, Office of the Chief Electoral Officer. pp. 302–305. "Fort McMurray-Wood Buffalo Statement of Official Results 2004 Alberta general election" (PDF). Elections Alberta.

=== 2008 ===
2008 Alberta general election
Party	Candidate	Votes	%	±%
Progressive Conservative	Guy C. Boutilier	4,519	63.41	+0.21
Liberal	Ross Jacobs	1,758	24.67	-1.02
New Democratic	Mel Kraley	550	7.72	+1.13
Greens	Reginald (Reg) Normore	300	4.21	+2.87
Total		7,127	99.62	–
Rejected, spoiled and declined		27	0.38	-0.39
Turnout		7,154	19.84	-6.71
Eligible electors		36,054		
Progressive Conservative hold		Swing		+0.62
Source(s) Source: "54 - Fort McMurray-Wood Buffalo, 2008 Alberta general election". officialresults.elections.ab.ca. Elections Alberta. The Report on the March 3, 2008 Provincial General Election of the Twenty-seventh Legislative Assembly (PDF). Elections Alberta. pp. 414–417.

=== 2012 ===
2012 Alberta general election
Party	Candidate	Votes	%	±%
Progressive Conservative	Mike Allen	3,609	48.99%	–14.42%
Wildrose Alliance	Guy C. Boutilier	3,164	42.95%	–
New Democratic	Denise Woollard	372	5.05%	–2.67%
Liberal	Amy McBain	222	3.01%	–21.65%
Total		7,367	–	–
Rejected, spoiled and declined		55	32	0
Eligible electors / turnout		21,843	33.98%	+14.14%
Progressive Conservative hold		Swing		–16.35%
Source(s) Source: "59 - Fort McMurray-Wood Buffalo, 2012 Alberta general election". officialresults.elections.ab.ca. Elections Alberta. Chief Electoral Officer (2012). The Report of the Chief Electoral Officer on the 2011 Provincial Enumeration and Monday, April 23, 2012 Provincial General Election of the Twenty-eighth Legislative Assembly (PDF) (Report). Edmonton, Alta.: Elections Alberta. pp. 352–355. Archived (PDF) from the original on May 6, 2021.

=== 2015 ===
2015 Alberta general election
Party	Candidate	Votes	%	±%
Wildrose	Tany Yao	3,835	40.03%	-2.92%
New Democratic	Stephen Drover	2,915	30.42%	25.38%
Progressive Conservative	Mike Allen	2,486	25.95%	-23.04%
Liberal	Robin Le Fevre	345	3.60%	0.59%
Total		9,581	–	–
Rejected, spoiled and declined		37	34	5
Eligible electors / turnout		22,940	41.95%	+7.97%
Wildrose gain from Progressive Conservative		Swing		1.78%
Source(s) Source: "59 - Fort McMurray-Wood Buffalo, 2015 Alberta general election". officialresults.elections.ab.ca. Elections Alberta. Chief Electoral Officer (2016). 2015 General Election. A Report of the Chief Electoral Officer (PDF) (Report). Edmonton, Alta.: Elections Alberta. pp. 325–326.

=== 2019 ===
2019 Alberta general election
Party	Candidate	Votes	%	±%
United Conservative	Tany Yao	10,269	71.06%	5.00%
New Democratic	Stephen Drover	3,129	21.65%	-8.77%
Alberta Party	Marcus Erlandson	804	5.56%	–
Alberta Independence	Michael Keller	249	1.72%	–
Total		14,451	–	–
Rejected, spoiled and declined		43	34	13
Eligible electors / turnout		22,497	64.48%	22.54%
United Conservative hold		Swing		6.93%
Source(s) Source: "61 - Fort McMurray-Wood Buffalo, 2019 Alberta general election". officialresults.elections.ab.ca. Elections Alberta. Alberta. Chief Electoral Officer (2019). 2019 General Election. A Report of the Chief Electoral Officer. Volume II (PDF) (Report). Vol. 2. Edmonton, Alta.: Elections Alberta. pp. 275–278. ISBN 978-1-988620-12-1. Change and swing for UCP candidate is based on the combination of Wildrose and PC candidate results.

=== 2023 ===
2023 Alberta general election
Party	Candidate	Votes	%	±%
United Conservative	Tany Yao	6,483	67.7	-3.36
New Democratic	Tanika Chaisson	1,884	19.7	-1.95
Independent	Funky Banjoko	625	6.5	–
Independent	Zulkifl Mujahid	331	3.5	–
Alberta Party	Bradley Friesen	255	2.7	-2.86
Total		10,455	100	–
Rejected and declined		86	0.5	
Turnout		9,578	41.60	
Eligible voters		23,219		
United Conservative hold		Swing		-1.41
Source(s) Source: Elections Alberta

== Senate nominee election results ==
=== 2004 ===
2004 Senate nominee election results: Fort McMurray-Wood Buffalo				Turnout 26.45%	
Affiliation	Candidate	Votes	% votes	% ballots	Rank
Progressive Conservative	Betty Unger	2,560	15.87%	50.23%	2
Progressive Conservative	Bert Brown	2,218	13.75%	43.52%	1
Progressive Conservative	Cliff Breitkreuz	1,882	11.67%	36.92%	3
Progressive Conservative	David Usherwood	1,683	10.43%	33.02%	6
Independent	Link Byfield	1,509	9.36%	29.61%	4
Progressive Conservative	Jim Silye	1,355	8.40%	26.58%	5
Alberta Alliance	Michael Roth	1,338	8.30%	26.25%	7
Independent	Tom Sindlinger	1,233	7.64%	24.19%	9
Alberta Alliance	Gary Horan	1,177	7.30%	23.09%	10
Alberta Alliance	Vance Gough	1,176	7.28%	23.07%	8
Total votes		16,131	100%		
Total ballots		5,097	3.17 votes per ballot		
Rejected, spoiled and declined		1,839			

Voters had the option of selecting four candidates on the ballot

== Nomination contests ==
UCP Fort McMurray-Wood Buffalo nomination contest: December 4, 2022

Candidate	Round 1		Round 2	
Candidate	Votes	%	Votes	%
Zulkifl Mujahid	188	38.6	212	51.0
Tany Yao	152	31.2	204	49.0
Keith Plowman	147	30.2	Eliminated	
Total	487	100.0	416	100.0

Note: Zulkifl Mujahid was later removed as the UCP candidate and incumbent Tany Yao was appointed as the candidate in April 2023.

== Student vote results ==
=== 2004 ===
Participating schools
Beacon Hill School
Dr. K.A. Clark School
Father Mercredi Catholic High School
Fort McMurray Christian School
Fort McMurray Composite High School
Timberlea Public School

On November 19, 2004, a student vote was conducted at participating Alberta schools to parallel the 2004 Alberta general election results. The vote was designed to educate students and simulate the electoral process for persons who have not yet reached the legal majority. The vote was conducted in 80 of the 83 provincial electoral districts with students voting for actual election candidates. Schools with a large student body that reside in another electoral district had the option to vote for candidates outside of the electoral district then where they were physically located.

2004 Alberta student vote results
Affiliation	Candidate	Votes	%
Progressive Conservative	Guy Boutilier	400	38.13%
NDP	Dave Malka	224	21.35%
Independent	Reginald Normore	199	18.97%
Liberal	Russell Collicott	163	15.54%
Alberta Alliance	Eugene Eklund	63	6.01%
Total		1,049	100%
Rejected, spoiled and declined		40	

=== 2012 ===
2012 Alberta student vote results
Affiliation	Candidate	Votes	%
Progressive Conservative	Mike Allen		%
Wildrose	Guy Boutilier		
Liberal	Amy McBain		%
NDP	Denise Woollard		%
Total			100%

== See also ==
- List of Alberta provincial electoral districts
- Canadian provincial electoral districts
