= Melissa Blake =

Canadian politician

Her Worship Melissa Blake

Mayor of Wood Buffalo, Alberta
- In office 2004–2017
- Preceded by: Doug Faulkner
- Succeeded by: Don Scott

Melissa Blake is the former mayor of the Regional Municipality of Wood Buffalo, which includes Fort McMurray.

Blake was elected as a municipal councillor in 1998 and re-elected to council in 2001. She was elected mayor in 2004 and would serve for four terms.

Blake announced in August 2016 that her fourth term as mayor would be her final and would not campaign for reelection in the 2017 municipal election. In October 2017, she told the Fort McMurray Today she would not be pursuing a political career in the near future. She was succeeded by Don Scott.

She is of Métis background, and is originally from Quebec. She was educated at Keyano College and Athabasca University.
