= Fort McMurray Today =

Canadian newspaper in Alberta

The Fort McMurray Today is a publication based in Fort McMurray, Alberta, Canada. It is considered the paper of record for Fort McMurray and covers a number of topics affecting the Regional Municipality of Wood Buffalo.

The daily newspaper was founded in 1974 after Bowes Publishing bought the weekly McMurray Courier, a weekly newspaper founded in 1970 by Frances Jean. Ownership transferred to Sun Media in 1988, which was then bought by Postmedia in 2014.

In 2017, the newspaper's coverage of the 2016 Fort McMurray Wildfire won a National Newspaper Award for breaking news. The award was shared with the combined newsroom of the Edmonton Journal and Edmonton Sun.

That same year, the newspaper also covered infrastructure for running water and sewage systems that have been a long-awaited priority for the RMWB's hamlets of Anzac, Conklin, Gregoire Lake Estates, Janvier (Chard) and Saprae Creek. Conklin and Janvier (Chard), which has a population that is mostly First Nation and Métis, also faced a housing crisis. The series was nominated in the Community Media category by the Canadian Association of Journalists.

Fort McMurray Today published Monday to Saturday until the 2016 Fort McMurray Wildfire on May 3, 2016.

The newspaper temporarily became an online-only publication until November 2016 when the tabloid began publishing Tuesday and Friday. A supplemental tabloid was delivered free throughout Fort McMurray every Thursday.

The newspaper became a free weekly in August 2019 that was published every Thursday. On January 17, 2023, Postmedia announced Fort McMurray Today and 11 other properties would become online news websites by the end of February.

== See also ==
- List of newspapers in Canada
- Media in Fort McMurray
