= Alberta Party candidates in the 2012 Alberta provincial election =

This is a list of the candidates who ran for the Alberta Party in the 28th Alberta provincial election. The party nominated candidates in 38 of the 87 electoral districts.

== Calgary area (11 of 28 seats) ==
Electoral district	Candidate name	Gender	Residence	Occupation and notes	Votes	%	Rank
Airdrie							
Calgary-Acadia							
Calgary-Bow	Ellen Phillips	female	Calgary	university student	232	1.56	5/5
Calgary-Buffalo	Cory Mack	female	Calgary	comedian	230	2.01	5/5
Calgary-Cross							
Calgary-Currie	Norm Kelly	male	Calgary	Crown attorney	539	3.28	5/6
Calgary-East							
Calgary-Elbow	Greg Clark	male	Calgary	IT consulting	517	2.68	5/6
Calgary-Fish Creek							
Calgary-Foothills							
Calgary-Fort							
Calgary-Glenmore							
Calgary-Greenway							
Calgary-Hawkwood	Kevin Woron	male	Calgary	radio host, pyrotechnician	241	1.25	5/8
Calgary-Hays							
Calgary-Klein							
Calgary-Lougheed							
Calgary-Mackay-Nose Hill	Jason Webster	male	Calgary	accountant	205	1.44	5/5
Calgary-McCall							
Calgary-Mountain View	Inshan Mohammed	male	Calgary	engineering consultant	255	1.48	5/5
Calgary-North West	Troy Millington				123	0.68	6/6
Calgary-Northern Hills							
Calgary-Shaw	Brandon Beasley	male	Calgary	writer	337	2.07	5/5
Calgary-South East							
Calgary-Varsity	Alex McBrien	male	Calgary	university student	255	1.44	5/6
Calgary-West	Pam Crosby	female	Calgary	non-profit organization worker	158	0.97	6/6
Chestermere-Rocky View							
Highwood							

== Edmonton area (19 of 26 seats) ==
Electoral district	Candidate name	Gender	Residence	Occupation and notes	Votes	%	Rank
Edmonton-Beverly-Clareview							
Edmonton-Calder	David Clark	male	Edmonton	occupational health and safety	194	1.30	5/6
Edmonton-Castle Downs	Jeff Funnell	male	Edmonton		260	1.70	5/5
Edmonton-Centre							
Edmonton-Decore							
Edmonton-Ellerslie	Chinwe Okelu	male	Edmonton	intergovernmental relations	523	3.96	5/6
Edmonton-Glenora	Sue Huff	female	Edmonton	school board trustee, former acting party leader	1,451	8.97	5/5
Edmonton-Gold Bar	Dennis O'Neill	male	Edmonton	transit operator	344	1.70	5/6
Edmonton-Highlands-Norwood	Cameron McCormick	male	Edmonton		200	1.68	5/6
Edmonton-Manning	Mark Wall	male	Edmonton	ordained minister	188	1.37	5/7
Edmonton-McClung	John Hudson	male	Edmonton	theater director	418	2.72	5/6
Edmonton-Meadowlark	Neil Mather	male	Edmonton	lawyer, party vice-president	262	1.81	5/5
Edmonton-Mill Creek	Judy Wilson	female	Edmonton	promotions	198	1.64	5/6
Edmonton-Mill Woods	Robert Leddy	male	Edmonton	surety broker, former interim party leader	263	1.87	6/6
Edmonton-Riverview	Timothy Wong	male	Edmonton	building material manufacturer	391	2.12	5/5
Edmonton-Rutherford	Michael Walters	male	Edmonton	community organizer	1,673	10.16	4/6
Edmonton-South West	Bryan Peacock	male	Edmonton	technology operations	308	2.04	5/5
Edmonton-Strathcona							
Edmonton-Whitemud	Julia Necheff	female	Edmonton	writer	444	2.22	5/5
Fort Saskatchewan-Vegreville							
Leduc-Beaumont	William Munsey	male	New Sarepta	Saskatoon berry farmer	453	2.76	5/6
Sherwood Park	Chris Kuchmak	male	Sherwood Park	school teacher	230	1.20	6/7
Spruce Grove-St. Albert							
St. Albert	Tim Osborne	male	St. Albert	consultant	1,195	6.13	5/5
Stony Plain	Kurtis Ewanchuk	male	Parkland County	telecommunications tower technician	217	1.32	5/6
Strathcona-Sherwood Park							

== Remainder of Province (8 of 33 seats) ==
Electoral district	Candidate name	Gender	Residence	Occupation and notes	Votes	%	Rank
Athabasca-Sturgeon-Redwater							
Banff-Cochrane							
Barrhead-Morinville-Westlock							
Battle River-Wainwright	Midge Lambert	female		retired business owner	265	1.72	5/5
Bonnyville-Cold Lake							
Cardston-Taber-Warner							
Cypress-Medicine Hat							
Drayton Valley-Devon							
Drumheller-Stettler	Andrew Berdahl	male	Drumheller	Drumheller town councillor	282	1.87	5/5
Dunvegan-Central Peace-Notley							
Fort McMurray-Conklin							
Fort McMurray-Wood Buffalo							
Grande Prairie-Smoky							
Grande Prairie-Wapiti							
Innisfail-Sylvan Lake	Danielle Klooster	female	Penhold	Penhold town councillor	749	4.88	3/5
Lac La Biche-St. Paul-Two Hills							
Lacombe-Ponoka	Tony Jeglum	male	Lacombe County	farmer	780	5.22	4/5
Lesser Slave Lake							
Lethbridge-East							
Lethbridge-West	David Walters	male	Lethbridge	teacher	268	1.69	5/5
Little Bow							
Livingstone-Macleod							
Medicine Hat							
Olds-Didsbury-Three Hills							
Peace River							
Red Deer-North	Brent Chalmers	male		teacher	248	1.90	5/5
Red Deer-South	Serge Gingras	male	Red Deer	college instructor	604	3.75	5/5
Rimbey-Rocky Mountain House-Sundre							
Strathmore-Brooks							
Vermilion-Lloydminster							
West Yellowhead	Glenn Taylor	male	Hinton	former town mayor, party leader	1,668	16.99	3/5
Wetaskiwin-Camrose							
Whitecourt-Ste. Anne							

== See also ==
- Alberta Electoral Boundary Re-distribution, 2010
