= Alberta Liberal Party candidates in the 2012 Alberta provincial election =

This is a list of the candidates who ran for the Alberta Liberal Party in the 28th Alberta provincial election. The party ran a full slate of 87, winning 5.

== Calgary area (28 seats) ==
Electoral district	Candidate name	Gender	Residence	Occupation / Notes	Votes	%	Rank
Airdrie	Joel Steacy				523	3.21	4/5
Calgary-Acadia	Nicole Hankel	female			940	6.28	3/5
Calgary-Bow	Stephanie Shewchuk	female			1,302	8.78	3/5
Calgary-Buffalo	Kent Hehr	male	Calgary	lawyer	4,744	41.49	1/5
Calgary-Cross	Narita Sherman	female			1,276	10.17	3/5
Calgary-Currie	Norval Horner	male		chemical engineer	2,640	16.05	3/6
Calgary-East	Ali Abdulbaki				780	6.00	4/5
Calgary-Elbow	Beena Ashar				1,065	5.53	3/6
Calgary-Fish Creek	Nazir Rahemtulla	male	Calgary	chartered accountant	1,241	7.08	3/4
Calgary-Foothills	Kurt Hansen	male	Calgary	consultant	1,414	9.16	3/4
Calgary-Fort	Said Abdulbaki	male	Calgary	business owner	1,126	10.12	3/5
Calgary-Glenmore	Dan MacAulay				1,437	7.10	3/4
Calgary-Greenway	Iqtidar Awan	male			1,285	10.62	3/4
Calgary-Hawkwood	Maria Davis				1,629	8.46	3/8
Calgary-Hays	Brian MacPhee	male			897	5.73	3/4
Calgary-Klein	Christopher Tahn	male	Calgary	lawyer	1,980	11.91	3/5
Calgary-Lougheed	Fred Stenson				1,160	7.43	3/4
Calgary-Mackay-Nose Hill	Don Thompson	male			1,103	7.77	3/5
Calgary-McCall	Darshan Kang	male	Chestermere	commercial realtor	3,854	36.54	1/6
Calgary-Mountain View	David Swann	male	Calgary	public health consultant	6,849	39.82	1/5
Calgary-North West	Robert Prcic	male			1,166	6.47	3/6
Calgary-Northern Hills	Kirstin Morrell				1,195	8.02	3/4
Calgary-Shaw	John Roggeveen	male	Calgary	lawyer	1,109	6.81	3/5
Calgary-South East	Brad Carroll				756	5.13	3/4
Calgary-Varsity	Bruce Payne	male	Calgary	carpenter	3,713	20.93	3/6
Calgary-West	Wilson McCutchan	male			1,217	7.46	3/6
Chestermere-Rocky View	Sian Ramsden				564	3.24	3/4
Highwood	Keegan Gibson				548	2.85	3/4

== Edmonton area (26 seats) ==
Electoral district	Candidate name	Gender	Residence	Occupation / Notes	Votes	%	Rank
Edmonton-Beverly-Clareview	Chris Heward	male			899	6.34	4/5
Edmonton-Calder	Alex Bosse	male			970	6.50	4/6
Edmonton-Castle Downs	Kim Cassady	male			1,767	11.54	4/5
Edmonton-Centre	Laurie Blakeman	female	Edmonton	theater manager	5,589	40.22	1/4
Edmonton-Decore	Ed Ammar	male		business owner	2,157	16.03	4/4
Edmonton-Ellerslie	Jennifer Ketsa	female			1,512	11.44	4/6
Edmonton-Glenora	Bruce Miller	male	Edmonton	university lecturer	1,668	10.32	4/5
Edmonton-Gold Bar	Josipa Petrunic	female	Edmonton	journalist	4,072	20.07	3/6
Edmonton-Highlands-Norwood	Keegan Wynychuk	male			587	4.64	4/6
Edmonton-Manning	Jonathan Huckabay	male	Edmonton	vice president of communications	1,094	7.94	4/7
Edmonton-McClung	Mo Elsalhy	male	Edmonton	pharmacist	3,800	24.69	2/6
Edmonton-Meadowlark	Raj Sherman	male	Edmonton	doctor, party leader	5,150	35.49	1/5
Edmonton-Mill Creek	Mike Butler	male			1,640	13.64	3/6
Edmonton-Mill Woods	Weslyn Mather	female	Edmonton	educator	2,983	21.25	3/6
Edmonton-Riverview	Arif Khan	male	Edmonton	manager	4,238	22.93	2/5
Edmonton-Rutherford	Rick Miller	male	Edmonton	business manager	3,524	22.02	2/6
Edmonton-South West	Rudy Arcilla	male			2,250	14.93	3/5
Edmonton-Strathcona	Ed Ramsden	male			681	4.49	4/5
Edmonton-Whitemud	Rick Szostak	male	Edmonton	writer	2,356	11.80	3/5
Fort Saskatchewan-Vegreville	Spencer Dunn	male			845	4.98	4/6
Leduc-Beaumont	Jasen Maminski	male		web developer	723	4.41	4/6
Sherwood Park	Dave Anderson	male	Sherwood Park	bus driver	1,835	9.57	3/7
Spruce Grove-St. Albert	Chris Austin				1,779	9.07	3/4
St. Albert	Kim Bugeaud				2,011	10.31	3/5
Stony Plain	Arlin Biffert	male			1,126	6.84	4/6
Strathcona-Sherwood Park	John Murray	male	Strathcona County	sanitary engineer	1,354	7.09	4/4

== Remainder of province (33 seats) ==
Electoral district	Candidate name	Gender	Residence	Occupation / Notes	Votes	%	Rank
Athabasca-Sturgeon-Redwater	Gino Akbari				476	3.12	4/4
Banff-Cochrane	Pete Helfrich	male		paramedic	2,234	14.09	3/4
Barrhead-Morinville-Westlock	Leslie Penny	female			929	5.58	4/5
Battle River-Wainwright	Amber Greenleese	female			469	3.04	4/5
Bonnyville-Cold Lake	Hubert Rodden	male	Cold Lake	former city councillor	536	5.47	3/4
Cardston-Taber-Warner	Helen McMenamin	female			332	3.03	4/4
Cypress-Medicine Hat	Jon Mastel	male			775	5.83	3/4
Drayton Valley-Devon	Chantel Lillycrop	female			538	3.78	4/4
Drumheller-Stettler	Cam Roset	male			362	2.40	4/5
Dunvegan-Central Peace-Notley	Carole Carby	female			256	2.90	4/4
Fort McMurray-Conklin	Ted Remenda				157	2.97	4/4
Fort McMurray-Wood Buffalo	Amy McBain	female			222	3.02	4/4
Grande Prairie-Smoky	Kevin McLean				578	4.85	4/5
Grande Prairie-Wapiti	Alya Nazarali				365	2.81	4/5
Innisfail-Sylvan Lake	Les Vidok	male			641	4.18	5/5
Lac La Biche-St. Paul-Two Hills	John Nowak				704	5.51	4/4
Lacombe-Ponoka	Kyle Morrow				754	5.04	5/5
Lesser Slave Lake	Steven Townsend				235	3.25	4/5
Lethbridge-East	Rob Miyashiro	male			2,374	14.75	3/4
Lethbridge-West	Bal Boora	male			881	5.56	4/5
Little Bow	Evertt Tanis				470	3.77	4/4
Livingstone-Macleod	Alex Macdonald				597	3.34	4/5
Medicine Hat	Matthew Sandford	male			1,101	7.95	4/5
Olds-Didsbury-Three Hills	Garth David				555	3.09	4/4
Peace River	Remi Tardif				509	6.54	4/4
Red Deer-North	Michael Dawe	male	Red Deer	columnist	2,330	17.83	3/5
Red Deer-South	Jason Chilibeck	male			1,193	7.41	4/5
Rimbey-Rocky Mountain House-Sundre	Mason Sisson				422	2.83	4/4
Strathmore-Brooks	Alex Wychopen				297	2.02	4/5
Vermilion-Lloydminster	Corina Ganton	female	Vermilion		463	3.85	3/5
West Yellowhead	Michael Martyna				310	3.16	5/5
Wetaskiwin-Camrose	Owen Chubb				502	3.51	4/5
Whitecourt-Ste. Anne	Vern Hardman	male			745	5.37	4/4

== See also ==
- Alberta Liberal Party candidates, 2008 Alberta provincial election
- Alberta Electoral Boundary Re-distribution, 2010
