= Alberta New Democratic Party candidates in the 2012 Alberta provincial election =

This is a list of the candidates who ran for the Alberta New Democratic Party in the 28th Alberta provincial election. The party ran a full slate of 87, winning 4.

== Calgary area (28 seats) ==
Electoral district	Candidate name	Gender	Residence	Occupation / Notes	Votes	%	Rank
Airdrie	Bryan Young	male	Airdrie		687	4.22	3/5
Calgary-Acadia	Nick Lepora	male	Calgary	graphic arts apprentice	676	4.51	4/5
Calgary-Bow	Jason Nishiyama	male	Calgary	school teacher	606	4.08	4/5
Calgary-Buffalo	Rebecca Eras	female	Calgary	marketing	541	4.73	4/5
Calgary-Cross	Reinaldo Conreras	male	Calgary	journalist	634	5.05	4/5
Calgary-Currie	Robert Scobel	male	Calgary	Canada Post employee	893	5.43	4/6
Calgary-East	Robyn Luff	female	Calgary	school teacher	1,135	8.73	3/5
Calgary-Elbow	Craig Coolahan	male	Calgary	technical writer	761	3.95	4/6
Calgary-Fish Creek	Eric Leavitt	male	Calgary	school teacher	961	5.48	4/4
Calgary-Foothills	Jenn Carkner	female	Calgary	university editor and research grants officer	578	3.75	4/4
Calgary-Fort	Don Monroe	male	Calgary	equipment operator	761	6.84	4/5
Calgary-Glenmore	Rick Collier	male	Calgary	university literature professor	1,204	5.95	4/4
Calgary-Greenway	Al Brown	male	Calgary	journeyman electrician	407	3.36	4/4
Calgary-Hawkwood	Collin Anderson	male	Calgary	journeyman communications electrician	893	4.64	4/8
Calgary-Hays	Regina Vergara	female			461	2.95	4/4
Calgary-Klein	Marc Power	male	Calgary	software trainer	1,687	10.15	4/5
Calgary-Lougheed	Brent Kelly	male	Edmonton	university student councillor	612	3.92	4/4
Calgary-Mackay-Nose Hill	Anne Wilson	female	Calgary	lawyer	844	5.94	4/5
Calgary-McCall	Colette Singh				226	2.14	4/6
Calgary-Mountain View	Christopher McMillan	male	Calgary	university student	863	5.02	4/5
Calgary-North West	Brian Malkinson	male	Calgary	designer	551	3.06	4/6
Calgary-Northern Hills	Stephanie Westlund	female	Calgary	writer	766	5.14	4/4
Calgary-Shaw	Ashley Fairall	female	Calgary	facility maintenance	615	3.78	4/5
Calgary-South East	Marta Warszynski	female			474	3.21	4/4
Calgary-Varsity	Jackie Seidel	female	Calgary	teacher	855	4.82	4/6
Calgary-West	Mary Nokleby	female	Calgary	bed-and-breakfast owner	491	3.01	4/6
Chestermere-Rocky View	Nathan Salmon	male	Chestermere	salesman	533	3.06	4/4
Highwood	Miles Dato	male		health care aide	392	2.04	4/4

== Edmonton area (26 seats) ==
Electoral district	Candidate name	Gender	Residence	Occupation / Notes	Votes	%	Rank
Edmonton-Beverly-Clareview	Deron Bilous	male	Edmonton	school teacher	5,264	37.11	1/5
Edmonton-Calder	David Eggen	male	Edmonton	school teacher	5,729	38.41	1/6
Edmonton-Castle Downs	Brian Labelle	male	Edmonton	family intervention generalist	1,934	12.63	3/5
Edmonton-Centre	Nadine Bailey	female	Edmonton	film production	2,258	16.25	3/4
Edmonton-Decore	Ali Haymour	male	Edmonton	sheriff	2,669	19.83	3/4
Edmonton-Ellerslie	Rod Loyola	male	Edmonton	voice actor, community television producer	2,115	16.00	3/6
Edmonton-Glenora	Ray Martin	male		former party and opposition leader	4,141	25.61	2/5
Edmonton-Gold Bar	Marlin Schmidt	male		hydrogeology	5,809	28.63	2/6
Edmonton-Highlands-Norwood	Brian Mason	male	Edmonton	party leader	6,823	53.93	1/6
Edmonton-Manning	Cindy Olsen	female	Edmonton	school board trustee	3,386	24.61	3/7
Edmonton-McClung	Lorne Dach	male	Edmonton	real estate broker	1,134	7.37	4/6
Edmonton-Meadowlark	Bridget Stirling	female	Edmonton	public educator	1,091	7.52	4/5
Edmonton-Mill Creek	Evelinne Teichgraber	female		business owner	1,336	11.09	4/6
Edmonton-Mill Woods	Sandra Azocar	female	Edmonton	child protection worker	1,982	14.13	4/6
Edmonton-Riverview	Lori Sigurdson	female	Edmonton	social worker	3,794	20.53	3/5
Edmonton-Rutherford	Melanie Samaroden	female		school teacher	1,364	8.29	5/6
Edmonton-South West	Muriel Stanley Venne	female		non-profit organizations worker	1,298	8.61	4/5
Edmonton-Strathcona	Rachel Notley	female	Edmonton	labour relations officer	9,403	61.96	1/5
Edmonton-Whitemud	Jim Graves	male	Edmonton	engineer	1,694	8.49	4/5
Fort Saskatchewan-Vegreville	Chris Fulmer	male		university student, 21 years old	1,556	9.17	3/6
Leduc-Beaumont	Hana Razga	female	Edmonton	human resources consultant	1,397	8.52	3/6
Sherwood Park	Lyndsay Pinder	female	Sherwood Park	administrative support	1,209	6.31	4/7
Spruce Grove-St. Albert	J.J. Trudeau	female		reverend	1,773	9.04	4/4
St. Albert	Nicole Bownes	female	Edmonton	registered nurse	1,679	8.61	4/5
Stony Plain	Linda Robinson	female		financial administrator	1,319	8.01	3/6
Strathcona-Sherwood Park	Mike Scott	male		Zamboni driver	1,625	8.51	3/4

== Remainder of province (33 seats) ==
Electoral district	Candidate name	Gender	Residence	Occupation / Notes	Votes	%	Rank
Athabasca-Sturgeon-Redwater	Mandy Melnyk	female	Smoky Lake County	farmer	2,091	13.72	3/4
Banff-Cochrane	Jamie Kleinsteuber	male	Cochrane	Calgary International Airport	1,059	6.68	4/4
Barrhead-Morinville-Westlock	Trudy Grebenstein	female		accountant	983	5.90	3/5
Battle River-Wainwright	Terry Zawalski	female	Edmonton	housing	775	5.02	3/5
Bonnyville-Cold Lake	Luann Bannister	female		parole officer	330	3.36	4/4
Cardston-Taber-Warner	Aaron Haugen	male			467	4.26	3/4
Cypress-Medicine Hat	Manuel Martinez	male	Medicine Hat	business owner	678	5.10	4/4
Drayton Valley-Devon	Doris Bannister	female	Edmonton	retired	879	6.17	3/4
Drumheller-Stettler	Aditya Rao	male	Edmonton	university student	416	2.76	3/5
Dunvegan-Central Peace-Notley	Nathan Macklin	male	Municipal District of Greenview No. 16	farmer	846	9.57	3/4
Fort McMurray-Conklin	Paul Pomerleau	male	Beaumont	construction electrician	419	7.92	3/4
Fort McMurray-Wood Buffalo	Denise Woollard	female		school teacher	393	4.93	3/4
Grande Prairie-Smoky	Mary Dahr	female	Grande Prairie	microbiology laboratory technologist	757	6.35	3/5
Grande Prairie-Wapiti	Paula Anderson	female	Grande Prairie	school teacher	1,208	9.29	3/5
Innisfail-Sylvan Lake	Patricia Norman	female	Red Deer County	non-profit organization worker	712	4.64	4/5
Lac La Biche-St. Paul-Two Hills	Phil Johnson	male		manager	706	5.53	3/4
Lacombe-Ponoka	Doug Hart	male	Ponoka County	registered nurse	1,482	9.91	3/5
Lesser Slave Lake	Steve Kaz	male	Sherwood Park	carpenter	427	5.91	3/5
Lethbridge-East	Tom Moffatt	male	Lethbridge	IT manager	1,987	12.34	4/4
Lethbridge-West	Shannon Phillips	female	Lethbridge	economic policy analyst	4,683	29.55	2/5
Little Bow	Bev Muendel-Atherstone	female	Lethbridge County	psychologist	767	6.15	3/4
Livingstone-Macleod	Matthew Halton	male			944	5.29	3/5
Medicine Hat	Dennis Perrier	male	Medicine Hat	school teacher	1,168	8.43	3/5
Olds-Didsbury-Three Hills	Kristie Krezanoski	female			565	3.15	3/4
Peace River	Wanda Laurin	female	Peace River	school teacher	729	9.36	3/4
Red Deer-North	Derrek Seelinger	male	Red Deer	City roads department	970	7.42	4/5
Red Deer-South	Lorna Watkinson-Zimmer	female	Red Deer	business owner	1,704	10.58	3/5
Rimbey-Rocky Mountain House-Sundre	Doreen Broska	female		retired	703	4.71	3/4
Strathmore-Brooks	Brad Bailey	male	Edmonton	street outreach worker	409	2.79	3/5
Vermilion-Lloydminster	Ray Stone	male	County of Minburn No. 27	former county councillor	413	3.43	4/5
West Yellowhead	Barry Madsen	male	Hinton	wireless internet technician	794	8.09	4/5
Wetaskiwin-Camrose	Bruce Hinkley	male	County of Wetaskiwin No. 10	school principal	1,578	11.02	3/5
Whitecourt-Ste. Anne	Blue Knox	female	Edmonton	university student	754	5.43	3/4

== See also ==
- Alberta Electoral Boundary Re-distribution, 2010
