= Evergreen Party of Alberta candidates in the 2012 Alberta provincial election =

This is a list of the candidates who ran for the Evergreen Party of Alberta in the 28th Alberta provincial election. The party nominated candidates in 25 of the 87 electoral districts. The party also ran Elizabeth Johannson in the Senate nominee election.

== Calgary area (11 of 28 seats) ==
Electoral district	Candidate name	Gender	Residence	Occupation / Notes	Votes	%	Rank
Airdrie							
Calgary-Acadia	Antoni Grochowski	male	Calgary	architect	202	1.35	5/5
Calgary-Bow							
Calgary-Buffalo							
Calgary-Cross	Susan Stratton	female	Calgary	university English professor	261	2.08	5/5
Calgary-Currie	Dean Halstead	male	Calgary	business CEO	224	1.36	6/6
Calgary-East							
Calgary-Elbow	William Hamilton	male	Calgary	communications consultant	226	1.17	6/6
Calgary-Fish Creek							
Calgary-Foothills							
Calgary-Fort	Janice Dixon	female	Calgary	arts	305	2.74	5/5
Calgary-Glenmore							
Calgary-Greenway							
Calgary-Hawkwood	Janet Keeping	female	Calgary		198	1.03	6/8
Calgary-Hays							
Calgary-Klein	Roger Gagné	male	Calgary	rehab centre worker	354	2.13	5/5
Calgary-Lougheed							
Calgary-Mackay-Nose Hill							
Calgary-McCall	Heather Brocklesby	female	Calgary	legal community	144	1.47	5/6
Calgary-Mountain View							
Calgary-North West	Bryan Hunt	male	Calgary	software development	150	0.83	5/6
Calgary-Northern Hills							
Calgary-Shaw							
Calgary-South East							
Calgary-Varsity	Carl Svoboda	male	Calgary	retired	234	1.32	6/6
Calgary-West	Karen Huggins	female	Calgary	peace work	209	1.28	5/6
Chestermere-Rocky View							
Highwood							

== Edmonton area (10 of 26 seats) ==
Electoral district	Candidate name	Gender	Residence	Occupation / Notes	Votes	%	Rank
Edmonton-Beverly-Clareview	Trey Capnerhurst	female	Edmonton	musician	151	1.06	5/5
Edmonton-Calder							
Edmonton-Castle Downs							
Edmonton-Centre							
Edmonton-Decore							
Edmonton-Ellerslie							
Edmonton-Glenora							
Edmonton-Gold Bar	David Parker	male	Edmonton	NAIT instructor	201	0.99	6/6
Edmonton-Highlands-Norwood	Dari Lynn	female	Edmonton	business owner	188	1.49	6/6
Edmonton-Manning	Chris Vallee	male	Edmonton	electrician	100	0.73	7/7
Edmonton-McClung	Nathan Forsyth	male	Edmonton	municipal engineer	102	0.66	6/6
Edmonton-Meadowlark							
Edmonton-Mill Creek							
Edmonton-Mill Woods							
Edmonton-Riverview							
Edmonton-Rutherford	David Tonner	male	Edmonton	construction work	86	0.52	6/6
Edmonton-South West							
Edmonton-Strathcona	Terry Noel	male			222	1.46	5/5
Edmonton-Whitemud							
Fort Saskatchewan-Vegreville	Matt Levicki	male		hockey player	229	1.35	5/6
Leduc-Beaumont	Jennifer Roach	female	Edmonton	chemical-free cleaning business owner	193	1.18	6/6
Sherwood Park							
Spruce Grove-St. Albert							
St. Albert							
Stony Plain	Matthew Burnett	male			149	0.91	6/6
Strathcona-Sherwood Park							

== Remainder of province (4 of 33 seats) ==
Electoral district	Candidate name	Gender	Residence	Occupation / Notes	Votes	%	Rank
Athabasca-Sturgeon-Redwater							
Banff-Cochrane							
Barrhead-Morinville-Westlock	Lisa Grant	female	Morinville	school bus driver	188	1.13	5/5
Battle River-Wainwright							
Bonnyville-Cold Lake							
Cardston-Taber-Warner							
Cypress-Medicine Hat							
Drayton Valley-Devon							
Drumheller-Stettler							
Dunvegan-Central Peace-Notley							
Fort McMurray-Conklin							
Fort McMurray-Wood Buffalo							
Grande Prairie-Smoky							
Grande Prairie-Wapiti							
Innisfail-Sylvan Lake							
Lac La Biche-St. Paul-Two Hills							
Lacombe-Ponoka							
Lesser Slave Lake							
Lethbridge-East							
Lethbridge-West							
Little Bow							
Livingstone-Macleod	Larry Ashmore	male		construction renovator, party leader	347	1.94	5/5
Medicine Hat	Graham Murray	male	Medicine Hat	NAIT student	212	1.53	5/5
Olds-Didsbury-Three Hills							
Peace River							
Red Deer-North							
Red Deer-South							
Rimbey-Rocky Mountain House-Sundre							
Strathmore-Brooks							
Vermilion-Lloydminster							
West Yellowhead							
Wetaskiwin-Camrose	Mike Donnelly	male	Camrose	printing press operator	192	1.34	5/5
Whitecourt-Ste. Anne							

== See also ==
- Alberta Greens candidates, 2004 Alberta provincial election
- Alberta Electoral Boundary Re-distribution, 2010
