= 2012 Alberta general election =

- April 23, 2012

87 seats in the Legislative Assembly of Alberta 44 seats needed for a majority
- Opinion polls
- Turnout: 54.37%
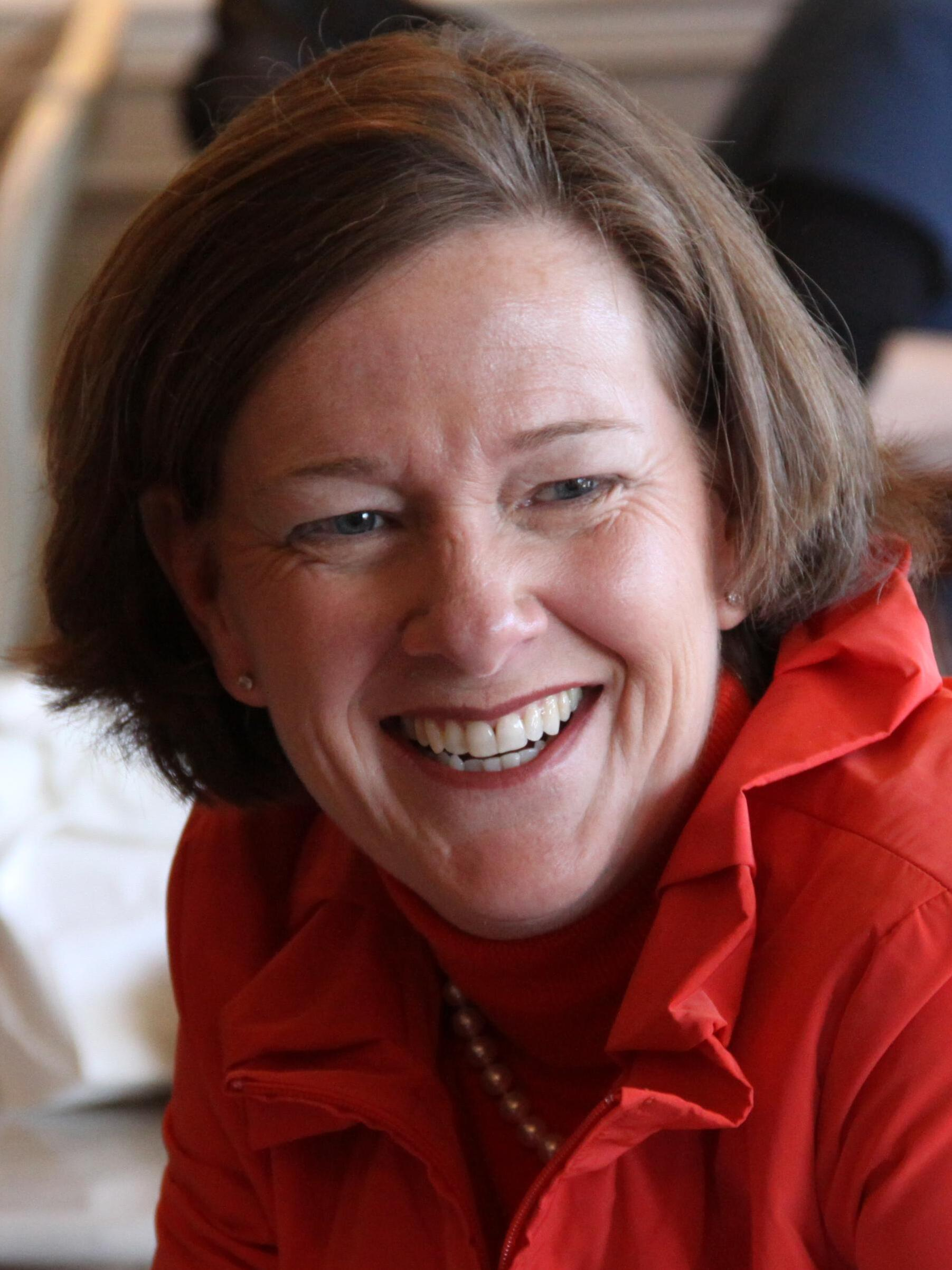

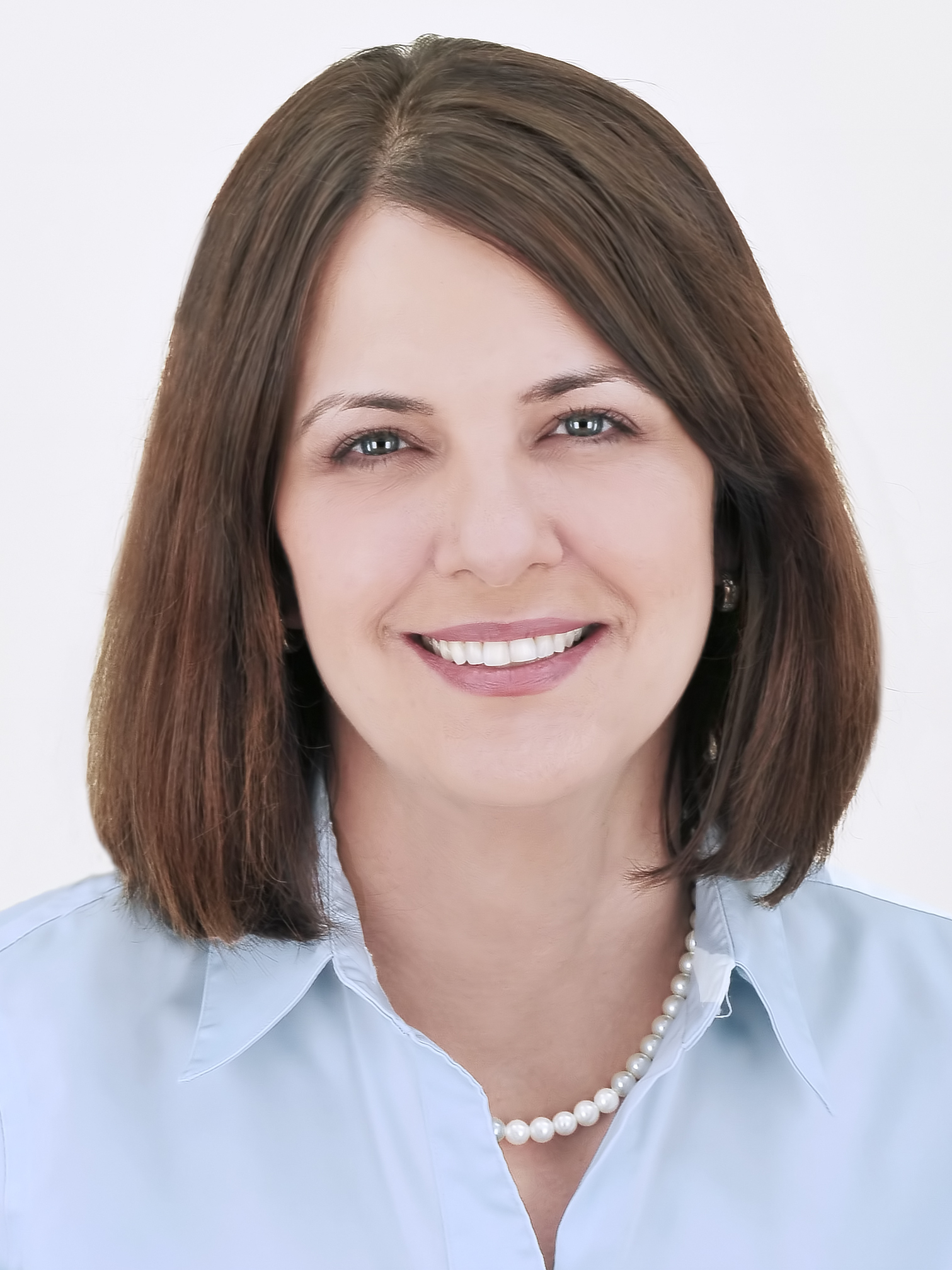

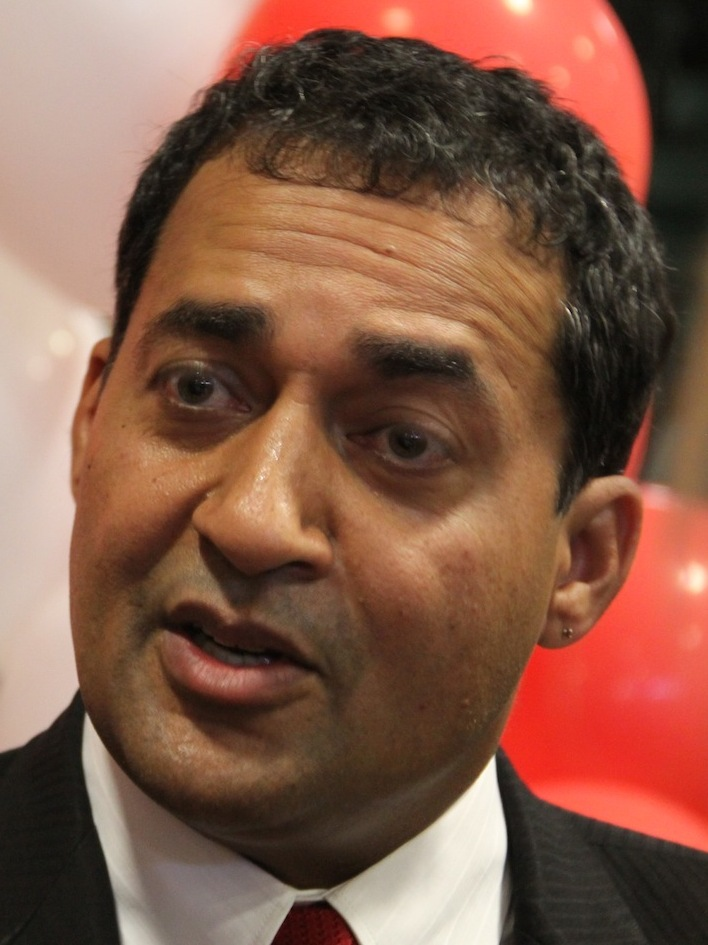

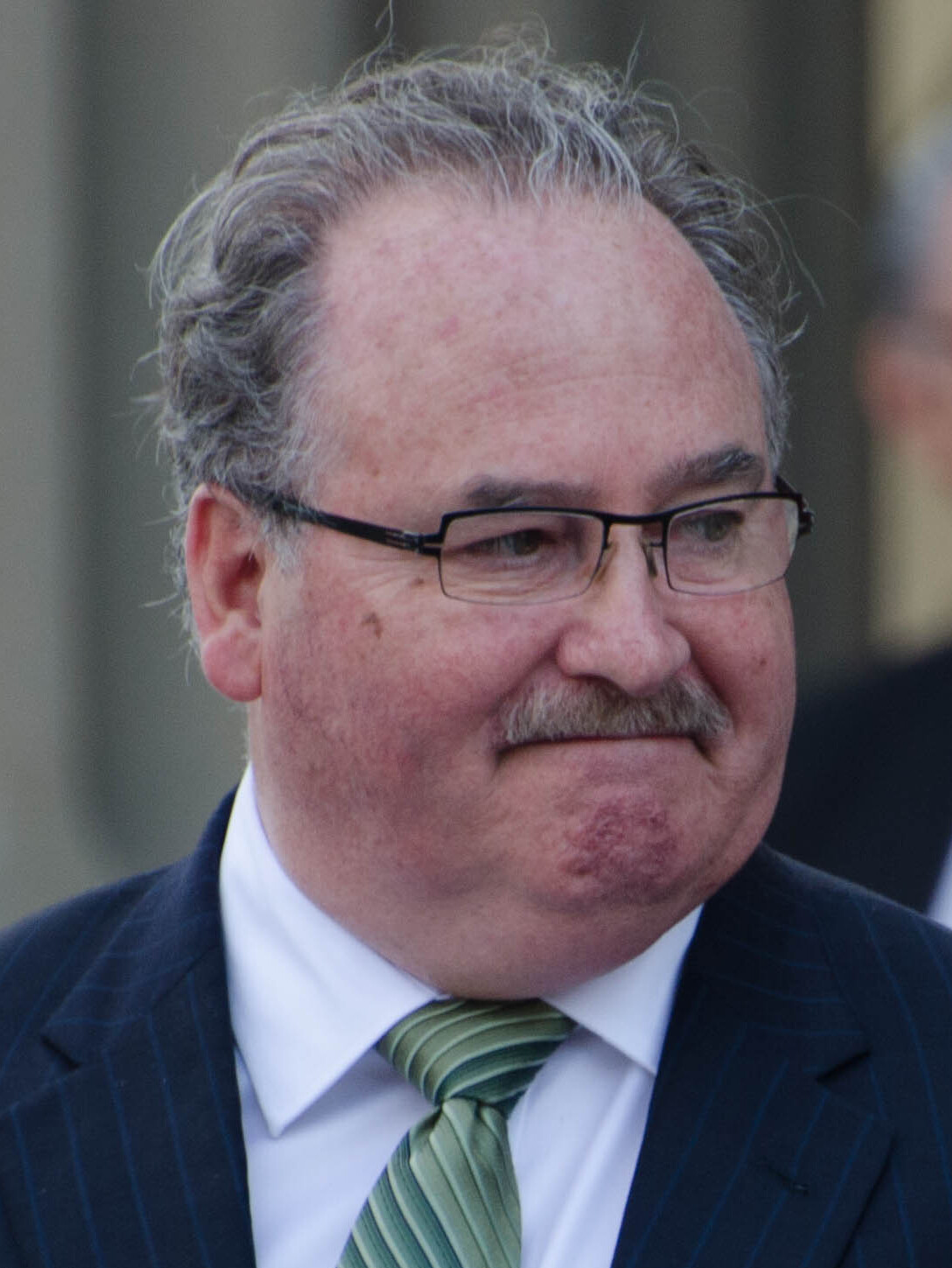

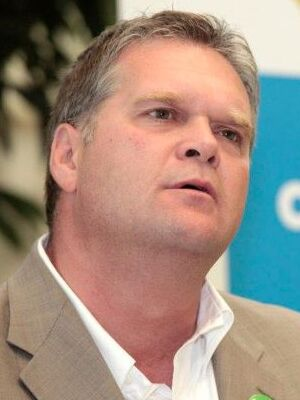
	First party	Second party	Third party
Leader	Alison Redford	Danielle Smith	Raj Sherman
Party	Progressive Conservative	Wildrose	Liberal
Leader since	October 2, 2011	October 17, 2009	September 10, 2011
Leader's seat	Calgary-Elbow	Highwood	Edmonton-Meadowlark
Last election	72 seats, 52.7%	0 seats, 6.8%	9 seats, 26.4%
Seats before	66	4	8
Seats won	61	17	5
Seat change	▼5	▲13	▼3
Popular vote	567,312	442,325	127,626
Percentage	43.97%	34.28%	9.89%
Swing	▼8.8pp	▲27.5pp	▼16.5pp
	Fourth party	Fifth party
Leader	Brian Mason	Glenn Taylor
Party	New Democratic	Alberta Party
Leader since	July 13, 2004	May 28, 2011
Leader's seat	Edmonton-Highlands-Norwood	Ran in West Yellowhead (lost)
Last election	2 seats, 8.5%	0 seats, 0.0%
Seats before	2	1
Seats won	4	0
Seat change	▲2	▼1
Popular vote	127,074	16,959
Percentage	9.85%	1.31%
Swing	▲1.3pp	▲1.3pp
- Popular vote by riding. As this is a first-past-the-post election, seat totals are not determined by total popular vote, but instead by results in each riding. Riding names are listed at the bottom.
Premier before election
Alison Redford
Progressive Conservative
Premier after election
Alison Redford
Progressive Conservative

The 2012 Alberta general election was held on April 23, 2012, to elect members of the 28th Legislative Assembly of Alberta. A Senate nominee election was called for the same day.

During the 2011 Progressive Conservative Association leadership election, eventual winner Alison Redford stated that if she became Premier she intended to pass legislation setting a fixed election date. After taking office, her government introduced a bill relating to the timing of elections, which was passed on December 6, 2011. Unlike other fixed election date legislation in Canada, the 2011 Election Amendment Act fixes the election to a three-month period, between March 1 and May 31 in the fourth calendar year. However, like other legislation, this does not affect the powers of the Lieutenant Governor to dissolve the Legislature before this period. The writs of elections were dropped March 26, 2012.

Although the Wildrose Party led opinion polls for much of the campaign, on election night the Progressive Conservatives defied expectations to win 61 seats – a net loss of only five – en route to their 12th consecutive majority government. It is colloquially known as the "'Lake of Fire' election" for a series of controversies by Wildrose candidates, perceived to have hampered the party's campaign.

The victory made Redford the third woman elected in her own right as a provincial premier in Canada (after Catherine Callbeck in Prince Edward Island in 1993, and Kathy Dunderdale in Newfoundland and Labrador in 2011), and the first woman elected premier in a province outside Atlantic Canada. On September 4, 2014, the Alberta PC Party became the longest-running provincial government in Canadian history. Wildrose leader Danielle Smith would later become the 19th premier of Alberta in October 2022, as leader of the United Conservative Party.

Overall, across the province, 1,290,352 valid votes were cast in this election.

== Background ==
=== 27th Legislature ===
The 27th Alberta Legislature saw a significant decline in the polls for the governing Progressive Conservatives (PCs) and the popularity of Premier Ed Stelmach.

The Wildrose Party was the primary beneficiary of voter migration in opinion polls from the governing PCs, after former leader Paul Hinman won a by-election, and the party elected Danielle Smith as leader. On January 4, 2010, the Wildrose caucus supplanted the New Democrats to become the third-largest in the legislature when PC MLAs Rob Anderson (Airdrie-Chestermere) and Heather Forsyth (Calgary-Fish Creek) joined Wildrose. Later in 2010, former PC cabinet minister Guy Boutilier (Fort McMurray-Wood Buffalo) joined, becoming the party's fourth MLA. However, their support has waned in the year following, as did polling fortunes for the Liberal Party, while the Alberta NDP was polling at double its result in the previous election.

The Liberals lost two MLAs during the 27th Legislature — Dave Taylor (Calgary Currie) who left to sit as an independent, before becoming the first MLA for the Alberta Party; and Bridget Pastoor (Lethbridge-East) who crossed the floor to join the PC caucus in November 2011. However, the Liberals gained one MLA in selecting Raj Sherman (Edmonton-Meadowlark) as their leader in September 2011, who had been ejected from the PC caucus in November 2010.

On January 25, 2011, Ed Stelmach abruptly announced that he would not seek re-election, and would resign as leader of the Progressive Conservatives and as premier after a successor was chosen. Alison Redford was chosen as Stelmach's successor on October 1, 2011, and following her election the PCs improved their results in opinion polls. Her new government presented six pieces of legislation, the most notable of which regarded fixed election dates, an investigation into health care, and tougher penalties for impaired driving. All six bills were passed in the fall 2011 sitting of the 27th Legislature. The 2012 election is a result of the fixed election legislation, which fixed the date of the next provincial election in Alberta between March 1 and May 31, 2012, and requires subsequent elections in that period in the fourth calendar year thereafter. The law does not affect the ability of Alberta's Lieutenant-Governor to dissolve the assembly and call an election before that time. However, that is not likely to occur during majority governments. The legislature was dissolved and the writs were dropped on March 26, 2012.

=== Green Party dispute ===
A year after the previous general election the Alberta Greens became mired in an internal dispute that resulted in the collapse of the party, and its de-registration by Elections Alberta. Some of the former Green party executive, including former deputy leader Edwin Erickson, eventually joined the Alberta Party, while others regrouped and founded the Evergreen Party of Alberta.

== Results ==
As indicated on the maps, the rural vote split largely on regional lines. Wildrose support was concentrated largely in Southern Alberta while the party won only one seat north of the 53rd parallel, while the PCs were reduced to just one seat in rural Southern Alberta. Wildrose won only three urban seats (two in Calgary and one in Medicine Hat) while the PCs won the majority of seats in both Calgary and Edmonton, swept Edmonton's suburbs and swept the two seats contested in each of Fort McMurray, Grande Prairie, Lethbridge and Red Deer. The Liberals were confined to the two largest cities, winning three seats in Calgary and two in Edmonton. The New Democrats won all four of their seats in Edmonton.

The PCs polled about 44 per cent of the popular vote, and four cabinet ministers were defeated. The Wildrose won 17 seats to become the Official Opposition for the first time. It was a net increase of thirteen seats for the party, although two of the four Wildrose incumbents (Guy Boutilier and Paul Hinman) were defeated by their PC challengers. The party polled more than 34 per cent of the popular vote, more than five times their share in the previous election, and finished a close second in dozens of constituencies.

The Liberals saw their share of the vote plummet by almost two thirds and polled under ten per cent for the first time since 1982. The result therefore appeared to give credence to speculation that Liberal voters from last election voted "strategically" for moderate PC candidates to defeat the more conservative Wildrose Party. Nevertheless, the five Liberal incumbents seeking re-election all managed to do so, with the Liberals losing the three seats where their incumbents did not run again. It was the Liberals' lowest seat total since the 1986 election. The Liberals were relegated to third party status in the Legislature for the first time since 1993.

The New Democrats won four seats, double their previous total and enough to secure official party status in the Legislature. Both NDP incumbents were re-elected. The NDP polled just under ten per cent of the vote, marginally less than the Liberals' share and a modest increase from the last election.

=== Summary ===

Summary of the April 23, 2012 Legislative Assembly of Alberta election results
Party	Party leader	Number of candidates	Seats				Popular vote		
Party	Party leader	Number of candidates	2008	Dissol.	2012	% Change	#^{1}	%	Change (pp)
Progressive Conservative	Alison Redford	87	72	66	61	–7.85	567,060	43.95	–8.77
Wildrose	Danielle Smith	87	—	4	17	+325	442,429	34.29	+27.51
Liberal	Raj Sherman	87	9	8	5	–37.5	127,645	9.89	–16.54
New Democratic	Brian Mason	87	2	2	4	+100	126,752	9.82	+1.34
Alberta Party	Glenn Taylor	38	—	1	—	–100	17,172	1.33	+1.32
Evergreen	Larry Ashmore	25	—^{2}	—	—	—	5,082	0.394	–4.16^{2}
Independent		12	—	1	—	–100	3,511	0.272	–0.53
Social Credit	Len Skowronski	3	—	—	—	—	294	0.0228	–0.19
Communist	Naomi Rankin	2	—	—	—	—	210	0.0163	+0.01
Separation	Bart Hampton^{3}	1^{3}	—	—	—	—	68	0.00527	0.00
Vacant				1					
Total		429	83	83	87	+4.82	1,290,223	100.00%	

Notes:

1. Results at the count.
2. Results change is compared to the Alberta Greens in 2008.
3. Elections Alberta lists Bart Hampton as leader of the Separation Party of Alberta, however the party's only candidate is party president Glen Dundas.

The voter turnout was 54%.

=== Vote and seats summaries ===
Popular vote
PC	43.95%
Wildrose	34.29%
Liberal	9.89%
New Democratic	9.82%
Others	2.05%

Seats summary
PC	70.11%
Wildrose	19.54%
Liberal	5.75%
New Democratic	4.60%

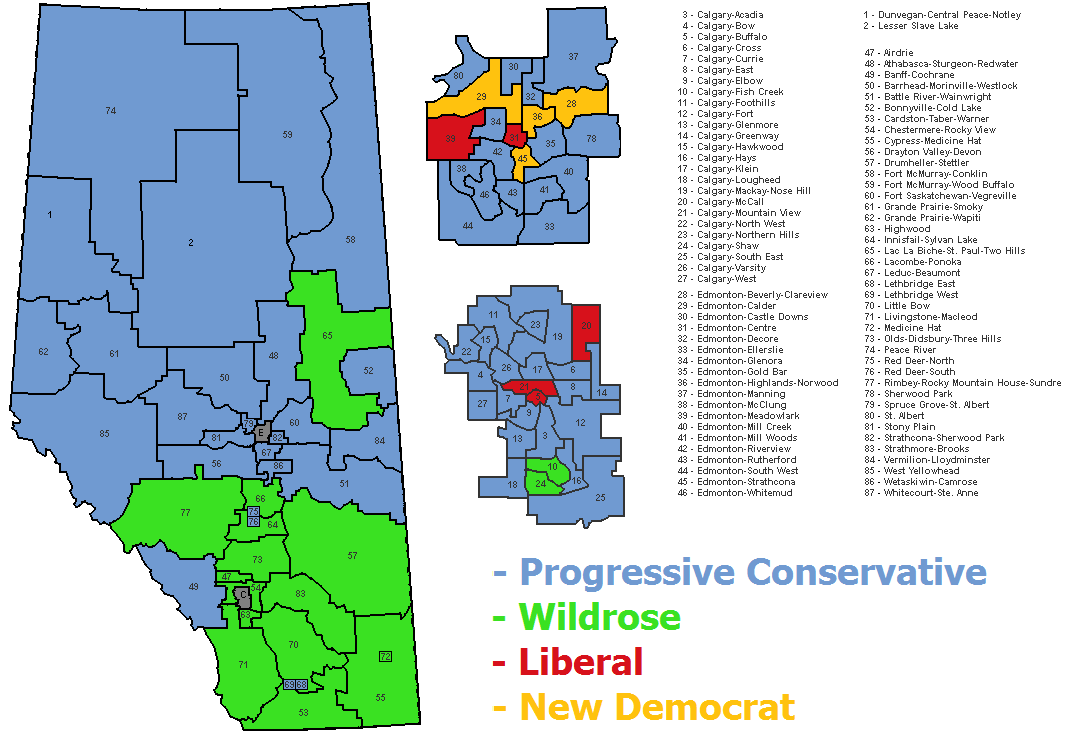
Results by riding

=== By region ===
Party		Calgary	Edm.	Leth.	Red Deer	North	Central	South	Total
Progressive Conservative	Seats	20	13	2	2	10	13	1	61
Progressive Conservative	Popular vote	46.16%	40.37%	38.65%	41.60%	47.70%	46.94%	38.33%	43.95%
Wildrose	Seats	2	0	0	0	1	5	9	17
Wildrose	Popular vote	35.61%	18.80%	29.45%	34.24%	39.69%	37.82%	51.49%	34.29%
Liberal	Seats	3	2	0	0	0	0	0	5
Liberal	Popular vote	11.89%	16.13%	10.19%	12.08%	4.29%	5.41%	4.90%	9.89%
New Democratic	Seats	0	4	0	0	0	0	0	4
New Democratic	Popular vote	4.79%	21.56%	20.88%	9.17%	7.64%	6.88%	4.68%	9.82%
Total seats		25	19	2	2	11	18	10	87
Alberta Party	Popular vote	0.80%	2.46%	0.84%	2.92%	—	2.05%	—	1.33%
Evergreen	Popular vote	0.65%	0.36%	—	—	0.16%	0.27%	0.37%	0.39%
Independents	Popular vote	0.04%	0.28%	—	—	0.52%	0.58%	0.20%	0.27%
Social Credit	Popular vote	0.03%	0.02%	—	—	—	0.04%	—	0.02%
Communist	Popular vote	0.04%	0.02%	—	—	—	—	—	0.02%
Separation	Popular vote	—	—	—	—	—	—	0.04%	0.01%

=== Gains, holds, and losses ===
Gains, holds, and losses by party
Party	Seats (dissol.)	Seats (2012)	Gains	Holds	Losses	Net change
Progressive Conservative	66	61	11	50	16	–5
Wildrose	4	17	15	2	2	+13
Liberal	8	5	0	5	3	–3
New Democratic	2	4	2	2	0	+2
Alberta Party	1	0	0	0	1	–1
Independents	1	0	0	0	1	–1
Total	82	87	28	59	23	+5

Gains and losses between parties
Loser\Gainer	PC	WP	NDP	Total losses
Progressive Conservative	—	14	2	16
Wildrose	2	—	0	2
Liberal	3	0	0	3
Alberta Party	1	0	0	1
Independents	1	0	0	1
New and vacant seats	4	1	0	5
Total gains	11	15	2	28

=== Defeated incumbents ===
Defeated incumbents and winners
Defeated incumbent	Affiliation	Winner	Affiliation	Electoral district
Paul Hinman	Wildrose	Linda Johnson	Progressive Conservative	Calgary-Glenmore
Ted Morton	Progressive Conservative	Bruce McAllister	Wildrose	Chestermere-Rocky View^{1}
Len Mitzel	Progressive Conservative	Drew Barnes	Wildrose	Cypress-Medicine Hat
Jack Hayden	Progressive Conservative	Rick Strankman	Wildrose	Drumheller-Stettler
Tony Vandermeer	Progressive Conservative	Deron Bilous	New Democratic	Edmonton-Beverly-Clareview
Carl Benito	Independent^{2}	Sohail Quadri	Progressive Conservative	Edmonton-Mill Woods
Guy Boutilier	Wildrose^{3}	Mike Allen	Progressive Conservative	Fort McMurray-Wood Buffalo
Luke Ouellette	Progressive Conservative	Kerry Towle	Wildrose	Innisfail-Sylvan Lake
Ray Danyluk	Progressive Conservative	Shayne Saskiw	Wildrose	Lac La Biche-St. Paul-Two Hills^{4}
Evan Beger	Progressive Conservative	Pat Stier	Wildrose	Livingstone-Macleod
Ty Lund	Progressive Conservative	Joe Anglin	Wildrose	Rimbey-Rocky Mountain House-Sundre^{5}
Arno Doerksen	Progressive Conservative	Jason Hale	Wildrose	Strathmore-Brooks

Notes:

1. Morton was an incumbent in Foothills-Rocky View
2. Benito sat as a Progressive Conservative in the 27th Legislative Assembly, lost the candidate nomination, and ran as an independent
3. Boutilier was elected as a Progressive Conservative in the 2008 election
4. Danyluk was an incumbent in Lac La Biche-St. Paul
5. Lund was an incumbent in Rocky Mountain House

== Opinion polls ==
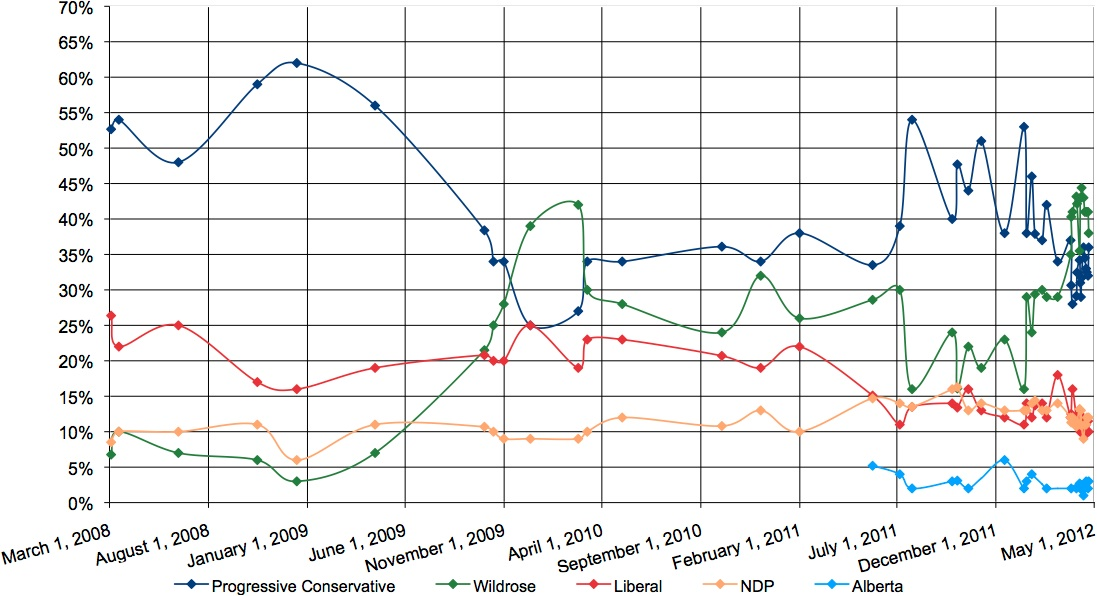
Graph of polling from the 2008 election to the 2012 election

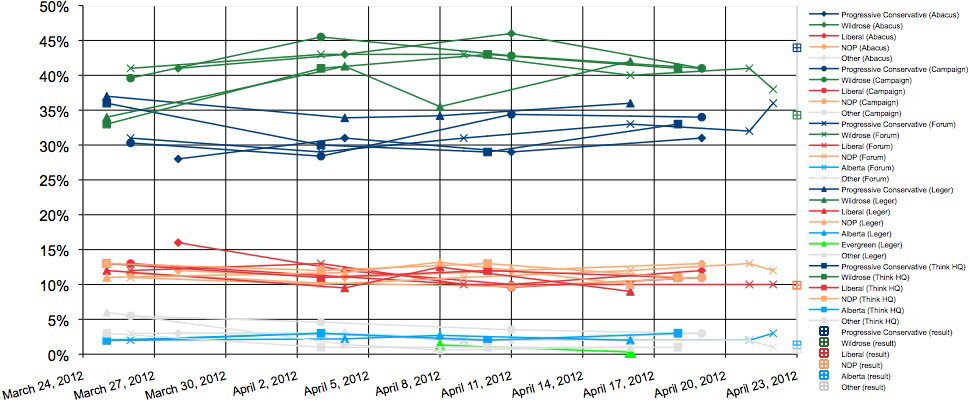
Graph of polling during the 2012 election showing trends by polling firm and party

The following is a summary of opinion polls leading up to the 2012 election.

Date of Polling	Polling Firm	PC	Wildrose	Liberal	NDP	Alberta	Evergreen	Other
April 23, 2012	Election 2012	44.0	34.3	9.9	9.8	1.3	0.4	0.3
April 22, 2012	Forum Research	36	38	10	12	3		1
April 21, 2012	Forum Research	32	41	10	13	2		2
April 20–21, 2012	Angus Reid	32	41	13	11			2
April 19, 2012	Campaign Research	34	41	11	11			3
April 18–19, 2012	Abacus Data	31	41	12	13			3
April 17–18, 2012	ThinkHQ Public Affairs	33	41	11	11	3		1
April 16, 2012	Forum Research	33	40	10	12	2		2
April 13–16, 2012	Leger Marketing	36	42	9	10	2	0.3	1
April 13–14, 2012	Return on Insight	36	43	11	9	1		0
April 12, 2012	Televised leaders' debate							
April 11, 2012	Campaign Research	34.4	42.8	9.6	9.7			3.5
April 9–11, 2012	Abacus Data	29	46	10	12			2
April 9–10, 2012	Think HQ Public Affairs	29	43	12	13	2		1
April 9, 2012	Forum Research	31	43	10	11	2		2
April 5–8, 2012	Leger Marketing	34.2	35.5	12.5	13.2	2.7	1.3	0.6
April 2–4, 2012	Abacus Data	31	43	12	11			3
April 2–4, 2012	Leger Marketing	33.9	41.3	9.5	11.7	2.2		1.4
April 3, 2012	Campaign Research	28.4	45.5	11.3	10.2			4.6
April 3, 2012	Forum Research	29	43	13	10	3		3
April 2–3, 2012	Think HQ Public Affairs	30	43	11	12	3		1
March 26–28, 2012	Abacus Data	28	41	16	12			3
March 26, 2012	Dissolution of the 27th Alberta Legislative Assembly, campaign begins							
March 26, 2012	Campaign Research	30.3	39.6	13.0	11.6			5.5
March 26, 2012	Forum Research	31	41	12	11	2		3
	Leger Marketing	37	34	12	11	2		6
March 22–25, 2012	Think HQ Public Affairs	36	33	13	13	2		3
March 20–25, 2012	Ipsos-Reid	38	38	11	12			2
March 5–7, 2012	Abacus Data	34	29	18	14			5
February 2012	Think HQ Public Affairs	42	29	12	13	2		2
February 10, 2012	Forum Research	37	30	14	13			6
Jan 30 – Feb 2, 2012	Abingdon Research	37.9	29.4	13.7	14.4			4.5
January 25–31, 2012	Return on Insight	46	24	12	14	4		0
January 17, 2012	Forum Research	38	29	14	13	3		4
January 13–18, 2012	Leger Marketing	53	16	11	13	2		6
December 22, 2011	Evergreen Party registered with Elections Alberta, Larry Ashmore becomes leader							
December 14, 2011	Forum Research	38	23	12	13	6		9
November 4–8, 2011	Environics	51	19	13	14			3
October 17–19, 2011	Angus Reid Strategies	44	22	16	13	2		3
October 1–2, 2011	Lethbridge College	47.7	16.1	13.4	16.3	3.1		3.4
October 1, 2011	Alison Redford becomes PC leader and Premier							
September 19–24, 2011	Think HQ Public Affairs	40	24	14	16	3		3
September 10, 2011	Raj Sherman becomes Liberal leader							
July 15–24, 2011	Environics	54	16	13.5	13.5	2		1
July 2011	Think HQ Public Affairs	39	30	11	14	4		2
May 28, 2011	Glenn Taylor becomes Alberta Party leader							
May 20–24, 2011	Abingdon	33.5	28.6	15.1	14.7	5.2		2.9
February 1, 2011	David Swann resigns as Liberal leader							
January 20–31, 2011	Environics	38	26	22	10			4
January 25, 2011	Ed Stelmach resigns as PC leader and Premier							
Nov 22 – Dec 2, 2010	Environics	34	32	19	13			2
November 24, 2010	Sue Huff becomes interim Alberta Party leader							
October 2–3, 2010	Lethbridge College	36.1	24	20.7	10.8			8.4
May 2, 2010	Environics	34	28	23	12			3
March 9, 2010	Environics	34	30	23	10		2	1
February 23, 2010	Angus Reid Strategies	27	42	19	9			3
January 28, 2010	Edwin Erickson becomes Alberta Party leader							
December 11, 2009	Angus Reid Strategies	25	39	25	9			2
October 19–31, 2009	Environics	34	28	20	9		8	0
October 17, 2009	Danielle Smith becomes Wildrose leader							
October 2009	Return on Insight	34	25	20	10		5	6
October 2009	Lethbridge College / Athabasca University	38.4	21.5	20.8	10.7			8.5
August 29, 2009	Robert Leddy becomes interim Alberta Party leader							
July 16, 2009	Alberta Greens deregistered with Elections Alberta							
April 2009	Angus Reid Strategies	56	7	19	11		7	0
December 10, 2008	David Swann becomes Liberal leader							
December 2008	Environics	62	3	16	6		14	0
October 2008	Environics	59	6	17	11		7	0
June 2008	Environics	48	7	25	10		10	0
March 2008	Environics	54	10	22	10		5	0
March 3, 2008	Election 2008	52.66	6.77	26.37	8.52	0.00	4.58	1.12

== MLAs not running again ==
Progressive Conservative

- Cindy Ady, Calgary-Shaw
- Ken Allred, St. Albert
- Lindsay Blackett, Calgary-North West
- Doug Elniski, Edmonton-Calder
- Iris Evans, Sherwood Park
- George Groeneveld, Highwood
- Broyce Jacobs, Cardston-Taber-Warner
- Arthur Johnston, Calgary-Hays
- Ron Liepert, Calgary-West
- Fred Lindsay, Stony Plain
- Mel Knight, Grande Prairie-Smoky
- Ken Kowalski, Barrhead-Morinville-Westlock
- Richard Marz, Olds-Didsbury-Three Hills
- Barry McFarland, Little Bow
- Ray Prins, Lacombe-Ponoka
- Rob Renner, Medicine Hat
- Ed Stelmach, Fort Saskatchewan-Vegreville
- Janis Tarchuk, Banff-Cochrane

Liberal

- Harry Chase, Calgary-Varsity
- Hugh MacDonald, Edmonton-Gold Bar
- Kevin Taft, Edmonton-Riverview

Alberta Party

- Dave Taylor, Calgary-Currie

Independent

- Lloyd Snelgrove, Vermilion-Lloydminster

== Timeline ==
- December 12, 2008: Calgary-Mountain View MLA David Swann wins the Leadership of the Alberta Liberals replacing Kevin Taft.
- May 15, 2009: Calgary-Glenmore MLA Ron Stevens resigns to accept a judgeship.
- July 16, 2009: The Alberta Greens is deregistered by Elections Alberta.
- July 18, 2009: Fort McMurray-Wood Buffalo MLA Guy Boutilier is removed from the Progressive Conservative caucus.
- August 29, 2009: Robert Leddy is chosen as the interim leader of the Alberta Party replacing Bruce Stubbs.
- September 14, 2009: A by-election in Calgary-Glenmore elects Wildrose Alliance interim leader Paul Hinman.
- October 17, 2009: The Wildrose Alliance selects Danielle Smith to replace Paul Hinman as leader in a convention in Edmonton.
- November 7, 2009: A leadership review of Premier Ed Stelmach is held at a PC convention in Edmonton. He garners 77.4% support.
- January 4, 2010: MLAs Rob Anderson and Heather Forsyth defect from the PC to the Wildrose Alliance.
- January 28, 2010: Edwin Erickson is acclaimed as leader of the Alberta Party replacing Robert Leddy.
- February 24, 2010: Alberta Boundaries Commission releases its interim report on new provincial boundaries.
- April 12, 2010: Calgary-Currie MLA Dave Taylor leaves the Liberal caucus to sit as an independent.
- June 25, 2010: PC, turned Independent, MLA Guy Boutilier joins the Wildrose Alliance.
- November 22, 2010: Edmonton-Meadowlark MLA Raj Sherman is removed from the Progressive Conservative caucus.
- November 24, 2010: Sue Huff becomes interim Alberta Party leader after Edwin Erickson resigns.
- December 1, 2010: The Legislative Assembly passes a bill outlining 87 electoral districts, up from the current 83. The last re-distribution was in 2004.
- January 24, 2011: Calgary-Currie MLA Dave Taylor sits as Alberta Party's first MLA.
- January 25, 2011: Premier Ed Stelmach announces his intention not to run for re-election, and announces he will resign his post as Premier when a successor has been chosen at a leadership convention.
- February 1, 2011: David Swann, Leader of the Alberta Liberal Party, announces his intention to step down as leader after the spring 2011 legislative session, though still acting as an MLA from Calgary-Mountain View.
- May 28, 2011: Glenn Taylor is elected leader of the Alberta Party.
- June 26, 2011: The Wildrose Alliance Party votes to change its name to Wildrose Party.
- September 10, 2011: Raj Sherman is elected leader of the Liberal Party.
- September 12, 2011: Independent MLA Raj Sherman joins the Liberal caucus.
- October 1, 2011: Alison Redford is elected leader of the PC Association.
- October 7, 2011: Redford is sworn in as premier.
- November 21, 2011: Liberal Bridget Pastoor crosses the floor to join the PC caucus.
- December 6, 2011: Third and final reading of Bill 21, legislating a general election between March 1 and May 31, 2012.
- December 22, 2011: The Evergreen Party of Alberta is registered with Elections Alberta, Larry Ashmore is the leader.
- January 27, 2012: Vermilion-Lloydminster MLA Lloyd Snelgrove leaves the PCs to sit as an independent.
- March 2012: Olds-Didsbury-Three Hills MLA Richard Marz resigns.
- March 26, 2012: 27th Alberta Legislative Assembly is dissolved, and the writs are dropped.
- April 9, 2012: Nominations close at 2:00 pm MT (UTC−6), with 429 people running in 87 ridings.
- April 12, 2012: A leader's debate is hosted by the Alberta media and news outlets at 6:30 pm MT. It was broadcast on multiple television and radio stations, Redford, Sherman, Smith, and Mason were in attendance.
- April 19, 2012: Advance polls open 9:00 am to 8:00 pm MT.
- April 20, 2012: Advance polls open 9:00 am to 8:00 pm MT.
- April 21, 2012: Advance polls open 9:00 am to 8:00 pm MT.
- April 23, 2012: Election Day
  - Polls open 9:00 am to 8:00 pm MT.
  - Media outlets declare a PC majority at 9:00 pm.
- May 3, 2012: Official announcement of the results.

== Nominated candidates ==
Party	Seats	Second	Third	Fourth	Fifth	Sixth	Seventh	Eighth	Total
Progressive Conservative	61	25	1	0	0	0	0	0	87
Wildrose	17	56	11	3	0	0	0	0	87
Liberal	5	3	37	39	3	0	0	0	87
New Democratic	4	3	36	43	1	0	0	0	87
Alberta Party	0	0	2	2	30	4	0	0	38
Evergreen	0	0	0	0	14	10	1	0	25
Independents	0	0	0	0	7	4	0	1	12
Communist	0	0	0	0	1	1	—	—	2
Separation	0	0	0	0	1	—	—	—	1
Social Credit	0	0	0	0	0	1	2	0	3
Total	**87**	**87**	**87**	**87**	**57**	**20**	**3**	**1**	429

Party	Average number of votes
Progressive Conservative	6,518
Wildrose	5,083
Liberal	1,467
New Democratic	1,457
Alberta Party	452
Evergreen	203
Communist	105
Social Credit	98
Separation	68

Bold indicates cabinet members, and party leaders are italicized.

=== Northern Alberta ===
Electoral District	Candidates					Incumbent
Electoral District	Progressive Conservative	Wildrose	Liberal	NDP	Other	Incumbent
Athabasca-Sturgeon-Redwater	Jeff Johnson; 7,377 (48.40%)	Travis Olson; 5,297 (34.75%)	Gino Akbari; 476 (3.12%)	Mandy Melnyk; 2,091 (13.72%)		**Jeff Johnson**; Athabasca-Redwater
Barrhead-Morinville-Westlock	Maureen Kubinec; 7,447 (44.74%)	Link Byfield; 7,106 (42.67%)	Leslie Penny; 929 (5.58%)	Trudy Grebenstein; 983 (5.90%)	Lisa Grant (Evergreen); 188 (1.13%)	Ken Kowalski
Bonnyville-Cold Lake	Genia Leskiw; 4,815 (49.10%)	Roy Doonanco; 4,126 (42.07%)	Hubert Rodden; 536 (5.47%)	Luann Bannister; 330 (3.36%)		Genia Leskiw
Dunvegan-Central Peace-Notley	Hector Goudreau; 3,983 (45.05%)	Kelly Hudson; 3,756 (42.48%)	Carole Carby; 256 (2.90%)	Nathan Macklin; 846 (9.57%)		Hector Goudreau; Dunvegan-Central Peace
Fort McMurray-Conklin	Don Scott; 2,591 (49.00%)	Doug Faulkner; 2,121 (40.11%)	Ted Remenda; 157 (2.97%)	Paul Pomerleau; 419 (7.92%)		New district
Fort McMurray-Wood Buffalo	Mike Allen; 3,611 (49.06%)	Guy Boutilier; 3,165 (43.00%)	Amy McBain; 222 (3.02%)	Denise Woollard; 363 (4.93%)		Guy Boutilier
Grande Prairie-Smoky	Everett McDonald; 5,474 (45.93%)	Todd Loewen; 4,901 (41.12%)	Kevin McLean; 578 (4.85%)	Mary Dahr; 757 (6.35%)	Andrew Muise (Ind.); 209 (1.75%)	Mel Knight
Grande Prairie-Wapiti	Wayne Drysdale; 6,710 (51.62%)	Ethane Jarvis; 4,511 (34.71%)	Alya Nazarali; 365 (2.81%)	Paula Anderson; 1,208 (9.29%)	Anthony Barendregt (Ind.); 204 (1.57%)	Wayne Drysdale
Lac La Biche-St. Paul-Two Hills	Ray Danyluk; 5,417 (42.40%)	Shayne Saskiw; 5,950 (46.57%)	John Nowak; 704 (5.51%)	Phil Johnson; 706 (5.53%)		**Ray Danyluk**; Lac La Biche-St. Paul
Lesser Slave Lake	Pearl Calahasen; 3,518 (48.71%)	Darryl Boisson; 2,847 (39.42%)	Steven Townsend; 235 (3.25%)	Steve Kaz; 427 (5.91%)	Donald Bissell (Ind.); 195 (2.70%)	Pearl Calahasen
Peace River	Frank Oberle; 4,334 (55.67%)	Alan Forsyth; 2,213 (28.43%)	Remi Tardif; 509 (6.54%)	Wanda Laurin; 729 (9.36%)		**Frank Oberle**

=== Central Edmonton ===
Electoral District	Candidates						Incumbent
Electoral District	Progressive Conservative	Wildrose	Liberal	NDP	Alberta Party	Other	Incumbent
Edmonton-Beverly-Clareview	Tony Vandermeer; 5,018 (35.38%)	Don Martin; 2,851 (20.10%)	Chris Heward; 899 (6.34%)	Deron Bilous; 5,264 (37.11%)		Trey Capenhurst (Evergreen); 151 (1.06%)	Tony Vandermeer
Edmonton-Calder	Bev Esslinger; 5,183 (34.75%)	Rich Neumann; 2,787 (18.69%)	Alex Bosse; 970 (6.50%)	David Eggen; 5,729 (38.41%)	David Clark; 194 (1.30%)	Margaret Saunter (Socred); 52 (0.35%)	Doug Elniski
Edmonton-Centre	Akash Khokhar; 4,289 (30.87%)	Barb de Groot; 1,759 (12.66%)	Laurie Blakeman; 5,589 (40.22%)	Nadine Bailey; 2,258 (16.25%)			Laurie Blakeman
Edmonton-Glenora	Heather Klimchuk; 6,176 (38.20%)	Don Koziak; 2,732 (16.90%)	Bruce Miller; 1,668 (10.32%)	Ray Martin; 4,141 (25.61%)	Sue Huff; 1,451 (8.97%)		**Heather Klimchuk**
Edmonton-Gold Bar	David Dorward; 6,689 (32.97%)	Linda Carlson; 3,175 (15.65%)	Josipa Petrunic; 4,072 (20.07%)	Marlin Schmidt; 5,809 (28.63%)	Dennis O'Neill; 344 (1.70%)	David Parker (Evergreen); 201 (0.99%)	Hugh MacDonald
Edmonton-Highlands-Norwood	Cristina Basualdo; 2,778 (21.96%)	Wayde Lever; 2,025 (16.40%)	Keegan Wynychuk; 587 (4.64%)	Brian Mason; 6,823 (53.93%)	Cam McCormick; 200 (1.58%)	Dari Lynn (Evergreen); 188 (1.49%)	Brian Mason
Edmonton-Mill Creek	Gene Zwozdesky; 6,633 (55.07%)	Adam Corsaut; 2,193 (18.21%)	Mike Butler; 1,640 (13.64%)	Evelinne Teichgraber; 1,336 (11.09%)	Judy Wilson; 198 (1.64%)	Naomi Rankin (Communist); 44 (0.37%)	Gene Zwozdesky
Edmonton-Mill Woods	Sohail Quadri; 4,943 (35.23%)	Joanne Autio; 3,314 (23.62%)	Weslyn Mather; 2,983 (21.25%)	Sandra Azocar; 1,982 (14.13%)	Robert Leddy; 263 (1.87%)	Carl Benito (Ind.); 547 (3.90%)	Carl Benito
Edmonton-Riverview	Steve Young; 7,196 (38.94%)	John Corie; 2,860 (15.48%)	Arif Khan; 4,238 (22.93%)	Lori Sigurdson; 3,794 (20.53%)	Timothy Wong; 391 (2.12%)		Kevin Taft
Edmonton-Rutherford	Fred Horne; 6,945 (42.19%)	Kyle McLeod; 2,769 (16.82%)	Rick Miller; 3,624 (22.02%)	Melanie Samaroden; 1,364 (8.29%)	Michael Walters; 1,673 (10.16%)	David Tonner (Evergreen); 86 (0.52%)	**Fred Horne**
Edmonton-Strathcona	Emerson Mayers; 3,093 (20.38%)	Meagen LaFave; 1,778 (11.72%)	Ed Ramsden; 681 (4.49%)	Rachel Notley; 9,403 (61.96%)		Terry Noel (Evergreen); 222 (1.46%)	Rachel Notley

=== Suburban Edmonton ===
Electoral District	Candidates						Incumbent
Electoral District	Progressive Conservative	Wildrose	Liberal	NDP	Alberta Party	Other	Incumbent
Edmonton-Castle Downs	Thomas Lukaszuk; 8,057 (52.61%)	John Oplanich; 3,297 (21.53%)	Kim Cassady; 1,767 (11.54%)	Brian Labelle; 1,934 (12.63%)	Jeff Funnell; 260 (1.70%)		**Thomas Lukaszuk**
Edmonton-Decore	Janice Sarich; 5,724 (42.54%)	Chris Bataluk; 2,909 (21.61%)	Ed Ammar; 2,157 (16.03%)	Ali Haymour; 2,669 (19.83%)			Janice Sarich
Edmonton-Ellerslie	Naresh Bhardwaj; 5,682 (42.99%)	Jackie Lovely; 3,249 (24.58%)	Jennifer Ketsa; 1,512 (11.44%)	Rod Loyola; 2,115 (16.00%)	Chinwe Okelu; 523 (3.96%)	Athena Bernal-Born (Ind.); 137 (1.04%)	Naresh Bhardwaj
Edmonton-Manning	Peter Sandhu; 5,446 (39.58%)	Peter Rodd; 3,411 (24.76%)	Jonathan Huckabay; 1,094 (7.94%)	Cindy Olsen; 3,386 (24.61%)	Mark Wall; 188 (1.37%)	Sam Hachem (Ind.); 135 (0.98%); Chris Vallee (Evergreen); 100 (0.73%)	Peter Sandhu
Edmonton-McClung	David Xiao; 7,179 (46.65%)	Peter Janisz; 2,756 (17.91%)	Mo Elsalhy; 3,800 (24.69%)	Lorne Dach; 1,134 (7.37%)	John Hudson; 418 (2.72%)	Nathan Forsyth (Evergreen); 102 (0.66%)	David Xiao
Edmonton-Meadowlark	Bob Maskell; 5,032 (34.67%)	Rick Newcombe; 2,978 (20.52%)	Raj Sherman; 5,150 (35.49%)	Bridget Stirling; 1,091 (7.52%)	Neil Mather; 262 (1.81%)		Raj Sherman
Edmonton-South West	Matt Jeneroux; 8,505 (56.42%)	Allan Hunsperger; 2,714 (18.00%)	Rudy Arcilla; 2,250 (14.93%)	Muriel Stanley Venne; 1,298 (8.61%)	Bryan Peacock; 308 (2.04%)		New district
Edmonton-Whitemud	Dave Hancock; 12,087 (60.55%)	Ian Crawford; 3,381 (16.94%)	Rick Szostak; 2,356 (11.80%)	Jim Graves; 1,694 (8.49%)	Julia Necheff; 444 (2.22%)		**David Hancock**
Sherwood Park	Cathy Olesen; 8,742 (45.60%)	Garnett Genuis; 5,957 (31.07%)	Dave Anderson; 1,835 (9.57%)	Lyndsay Pinder; 1,209 (6.31%)	Chris Kuchmak; 230 (1.20%)	James Ford (Ind.); 1,063 (5.54%); Gordon Barrett (Socred); 137 (0.71%)	Iris Evans
St. Albert	Stephen Khan; 10,481 (53.76%)	James Burrows; 4,130 (21.18%)	Kim Bugeaud; 2,011 (10.31%)	Nicole Bownes; 1,679 (8.61%)	Tim Osborne; 1,195 (6.13%)		Ken Allred

=== Western and Central Alberta ===
Electoral District	Candidates						Incumbent
Electoral District	Progressive Conservative	Wildrose	Liberal	NDP	Alberta Party	Evergreen	Incumbent
Drayton Valley-Devon	Diana McQueen; 7,358 (51.56%)	Dean Shular; 5,462 (38.36%)	Chantelle Lillycrop; 538 (3.78%)	Doris Bannister; 879 (6.17%)			**Diana McQueen**; Drayton Valley-Calmar
Innisfail-Sylvan Lake	Luke Ouellette; 6,149 (40.08%)	Kerry Towle; 7,091 (46.22%)	Les Vidok; 641 (4.18%)	Patricia Norman; 712 (4.64%)	Danielle Klooster; 749 (4.88%)		Luke Ouellette
Olds-Didsbury-Three Hills	Darcy Davis; 6,633 (36.99%)	Bruce Rowe; 10,181 (56.77%)	Garth Davis; 555 (3.09%)	Kristie Krezanoski; 565 (3.15%)			Vacant
Red Deer-North	Mary Anne Jablonski; 5,091 (38.95%)	Randy Weins; 4,430 (33.90%)	Michael Dawe; 2,330 (17.83%)	Derrek Seelinger; 970 (7.42%)	Brent Chalmers; 248 (1.90%)		Mary Anne Jablonski
Red Deer-South	Cal Dallas; 7,044 (43.74%)	Nathan Stephan; 5,558 (34.52%)	Jason Chilibeck; 1,193 (7.41%)	Lorna Watkinson-Zimmer; 1,704 (10.58%)	Serge Gingras; 604 (3.75%)		**Cal Dallas**
Rimbey-Rocky Mountain House-Sundre	Ty Lund; 6,145 (41.49%)	Joe Anglin; 7,647 (51.26%)	Mason Sisson; 422 (2.83%)	Doreen Broska; 703 (4.71%)			Ty Lund; Rocky Mountain House
Spruce Grove-St. Albert	Doug Horner; 10,722 (54.67%)	Travis Hughes; 5,340 (27.23%)	Chris Austin; 1,779 (9.07%)	Juliette "J.J." Trudeau; 1,773 (9.04%)			**Doug Horner**; Spruce Grove-Sturgeon-St. Albert
Stony Plain	Ken Lemke; 7,496 (45.54%)	Hal Tagg; 6,153 (37.37%)	Arlin Biffert; 1,126 (6.84%)	Linda Robinson; 1,319 (8.01%)	Kurtis Ewanchuk; 217 (1.32%)	Matthew Burnett; 149 (0.91%)	Fred Lindsay
West Yellowhead	Robin Campbell; 4,405 (44.86%)	Stuart Taylor; 2,642 (26.41%)	Michael Martyna; 310 (3.16%)	Barry Madsen; 794 (8.09%)	Glenn Taylor; 1,668 (16.99%)		Robin Campbell
Whitecourt-Ste. Anne	George VanderBurg; 6,373 (45.93%)	Maryann Chichak; 6,003 (43.26%)	Vern Hardman; 745 (5.37%)	Blue Knox; 754 (5.43%)			**George VanderBurg**

=== East Central Alberta ===
Electoral District	Candidates						Incumbent
Electoral District	Progressive Conservative	Wildrose	Liberal	NDP	Alberta Party	Other	Incumbent
Battle River-Wainwright	Doug Griffiths; 7,205 (46.71%)	Dave Nelson; 6,710 (43.50%)	Amber Greenleese; 469 (3.04%)	Terry Zawalski; 775 (5.02%)	Midge Lambert; 265 (1.72%)		**Doug Griffiths**
Drumheller-Stettler	Jack Hayden; 6,572 (43.58%)	Rick Strankman; 7,451 (49.40%)	Cam Roset; 362 (2.40%)	Aditya "Adi" Rao; 416 (2.76%)	Andrew Berdahl; 282 (1.87%)		**Jack Hayden**
Fort Saskatchewan-Vegreville	Jacquie Fenske; 8,366 (49.28%)	Shannon Stubbs; 5,800 (34.17%)	Spencer Dunn; 845 (4.98%)	Chris Fulmer; 1,556 (9.17%)		Matt Levicki (Evergreen); 229 (1.35%); Peter Schneider (Ind.); 180 (1.06%)	Ed Stelmach
Lacombe-Ponoka	Steve Christie; 5,354 (35.87%)	Rod Fox; 6,573 (43.96%)	Kyle Morrow; 754 (5.04%)	Doug Hart; 1,482 (9.91%)	Tony Jeglum; 780 (5.22%)		Ray Prins
Leduc-Beaumont	George Rogers; 8,417 (51.31%)	David Stasiewich; 5,222 (31.83%)	Jasen Maminski; 723 (4.41%)	Hana Razga; 1,397 (8.52%)	William Munsey; 453 (2.76%)	Jennifer Roach (Evergreen); 193 (1.18%)	George Rogers; Leduc-Beaumont-Devon
Strathcona-Sherwood Park	Dave Quest; 9,698 (50.77%)	Paul Nemetchek; 6,424 (33.63%)	John Murray; 1,354 (7.09%)	Michael Scott; 1,625 (8.51%)			Dave Quest; Strathcona
Vermilion-Lloydminster	Richard Starke; 6,245 (51.92%)	Danny Hozack; 4,507 (37.47%)	Corina Ganton; 463 (3.85%)	Ray Stone; 413 (3.43%)		Richard Yaceyko (Ind.); 399 (3.32%)	Lloyd Snelgrove
Wetaskiwin-Camrose	Verlyn Olson; 7,489 (52.32%)	Trevor Miller; 4,552 (31.80%)	Owen Chubb; 502 (3.51%)	Bruce Hinkley; 1,578 (11.02%)		Mike Donnelly (Evergreen); 192 (1.34%)	**Verlyn Olson**

=== Central Calgary ===
Electoral District	Candidates						Incumbent
Electoral District	Progressive Conservative	Wildrose	Liberal	NDP	Evergreen	Other	Incumbent
Calgary-Acadia	Jonathan Denis; 6,846 (45.71%)	Richard Jones; 6,312 (42.15%)	Nicole Hankel; 940 (6.28%)	Nick Lepora; 676 (4.51%)	Antoni Grochowski; 202 (1.35%)		**Jonathan Denis**; Calgary-Egmont
Calgary-Buffalo	Jamie Lall; 3,505 (30.66%)	Mike Blanchard; 2,413 (21.11%)	Kent Hehr; 4,744 (41.49%)	Rebecca Eras; 541 (4.73%)		Cory Mack (Alberta); 230 (2.01%)	Kent Hehr
Calgary-Cross	Yvonne Fritz; 5,492 (43.77%)	Happy Mann; 4,884 (38.93%)	Narita Sherman; 1,276 (10.17%)	Reinaldo Contreras; 634 (5.05%)	Susan Stratton; 261 (2.08%)		Yvonne Fritz
Calgary-Currie	Christine Cusanelli; 7,395 (44.96%)	Corrie Adolph; 4,758 (28.93%)	Norval Horner; 2,640 (16.05%)	Robert Scobel; 893 (5.43%)	Dean Halstead; 224 (1.36%)	Norm Kelly (Alberta); 539 (3.28%)	Dave Taylor
Calgary-East	Moe Amery; 5,929 (45.59%)	Jasbir "Jesse" Minhas; 4,995 (38.41%)	Ali Abdulbaki; 780 (6.00%)	Robyn Luff; 1,135 (8.73%)		Bonnie Devine (Communist); 166 (1.28%)	Moe Amery
Calgary-Elbow	Alison Redford; 11,181 (58.01%)	James Cole; 5,523 (28.66%)	Beena Ashar; 1,065 (5.53%)	Craig Coolahan; 761 (3.95%)	William Hamilton; 226 (1.17%)	Greg Clark (Alberta); 517 (2.68%)	**Alison Redford**
Calgary-Fish Creek	Wendelin Fraser; 7,626 (43.51%)	Heather Forsyth; 7,700 (43.93%)	Nazir Rahemtulla; 1,241 (7.08%)	Eric Leavitt; 961 (5.48%)			Heather Forsyth
Calgary-Fort	Wayne Cao; 4,576 (41.13%)	Jeevan Mangat; 4,358 (39.17%)	Said Abdulbaki; 1,126 (10.12%)	Don Monroe; 761 (6.84%)	Janice Dixon; 305 (2.74%)		Wayne Cao
Calgary-Glenmore	Linda Johnson; 9,721 (48.02%)	Paul Hinman; 7,880 (38.93%)	Dan MacAulay; 1,437 (7.10%)	Rick Collier; 1,204 (5.95%)			Paul Hinman
Calgary-Klein	Kyle Fawcett; 6,852 (41.21%)	Jeremy Nixon; 5,755 (34.61%)	Christopher Tahn; 1,980 (11.91%)	Marc Power; 1,687 (10.15%)	Roger Gagné; 354 (2.13%)		Kyle Fawcett; Calgary-North Hill
Calgary-Mountain View	Cecilia Low; 5,293 (30.77%)	Shane McAllister; 3,942 (22.92%)	David Swann; 6,849 (39.82%)	Christopher McMillan; 863 (5.02%)		Inshan Mohammed (Alberta); 255 (1.48%)	David Swann
Calgary-Varsity	Donna Kennedy-Glans; 8,099 (45.65%)	Rob Solinger; 4,586 (25.85%)	Bruce Payne; 3,713 (20.93%)	Jackie Seidel; 855 (4.82%)	Carl Svoboda; 234 (1.32%)	Alex McBrien (Alberta); 255 (1.44%)	Harry Chase

=== Suburban Calgary ===
Electoral District	Candidates							Incumbent
Electoral District	Progressive Conservative	Wildrose	Liberal	NDP	Alberta Party	Evergreen	Other	Incumbent
Calgary-Bow	Alana DeLong; 6,997 (47.16%)	Tim Dyck; 5,700 (38.42%)	Stephanie Shewchuk; 1,302 (8.78%)	Jason Nishiyama; 606 (4.08%)	Ellen Phillips; 232 (1.56%)			Alana DeLong
Calgary-Foothills	Len Webber; 8,260 (53.74%)	Dustin Nau; 5,117 (33.55%)	Kurt Hansen; 1,414 (9.16%)	Jennifer Carkner; 578 (3.75%)				Len Webber
Calgary-Greenway	Manmeet Bhullar; 6,509 (53.80%)	Ron Leech; 3,898 (32.22%)	Iqtidar Awan; 1,285 (10.62%)	Al Brown; 407 (3.36%)				**Manmeet Bhullar**; Calgary-Montrose
Calgary-Hawkwood	Jason Luan; 9,050 (46.99%)	David Yager; 7,046 (36.58%)	Maria Davis; 1,629 (8.46%)	Collin Anderson; 893 (4.64%)	Kevin Woron; 241 (1.25%)	Janet Keeping; 198 (1.03%)	Len Skowronski (Socred); 105 (0.55%); Ed Torrance (Ind.); 99 (0.51%)	New district
Calgary-Hays	Ric McIver; 8,614 (55.07%)	Wayne Anderson; 5,670 (36.25%)	Brian MacPhee; 897 (5.73%)	Regina Vergara; 461 (2.95%)				Arthur Johnston
Calgary-Lougheed	Dave Rodney; 7,849 (50.26%)	John Carpay; 5,995 (38.39%)	Fred Stenson; 1,160 (7.43%)	Brent Kelly; 612 (3.92%)				Dave Rodney
Calgary-Mackay-Nose Hill	Neil Brown; 6,594 (46.42%)	Roy Alexander; 5,458 (38.43%)	Don Thompson; 1,103 (7.77%)	Anne Wilson; 844 (5.94%)	Jason Webster; 205 (1.44%)			Teresa Woo-Paw; Calgary-Mackay
Calgary-Mackay-Nose Hill	Neil Brown; 6,594 (46.42%)	Roy Alexander; 5,458 (38.43%)	Don Thompson; 1,103 (7.77%)	Anne Wilson; 844 (5.94%)	Jason Webster; 205 (1.44%)			Merged district
Calgary-Mackay-Nose Hill	Neil Brown; 6,594 (46.42%)	Roy Alexander; 5,458 (38.43%)	Don Thompson; 1,103 (7.77%)	Anne Wilson; 844 (5.94%)	Jason Webster; 205 (1.44%)			Neil Brown; Calgary-Nose Hill
Calgary-McCall	Muhammad Rasheed; 3,093 (29.33%)	Grant Galpin; 3,183 (30.18%)	Darshan Kang; 3,854 (36.54%)	Colette Singh; 226 (2.14%)		Heather Brocklesby; 144 (1.47%)	Tanveer Taj (Ind.); 46 (0.44%)	Darshan Kang
Calgary-North West	Sandra Jansen; 9,164 (50.82%)	Chris Challis; 6,879 (38.15%)	Robert Prcic; 1,166 (6.47%)	Brian Malkinson; 551 (3.06%)	Troy Millington; 123 (0.68%)	Bryan Hunt; 150 (0.83%)		Lindsay Blackett
Calgary-Northern Hills	Teresa Woo-Paw; 7,353 (49.37%)	Prasad Panda; 5,580 (37.46%)	Kirstin Morrell; 1,195 (8.02%)	Stephanie Westlund; 766 (5.14%)				Teresa Woo-Paw; Calgary-Mackay
Calgary-Shaw	Farouk Adatia; 6,864 (42.13%)	Jeff Wilson; 7,366 (45.22%)	John Roggeveen; 1,109 (6.81%)	Ashley Fairall; 615 (3.78%)	Brandon Beasley; 337 (2.07%)			Cindy Ady
Calgary-South East	Rick Fraser; 7,162 (48.57%)	Bill Jarvis; 6,355 (43.09%)	Brad Carroll; 756 (5.13%)	Marta Warszynski; 474 (3.21%)				New district
Calgary-West	Ken Hughes; 8,148 (49.95%)	Andrew Constantinidis; 6,090 (37.33%)	Wilson McCutchan; 1,217 (7.46%)	Mary Nokleby; 491 (3.01%)	Pam Crosby; 158 (0.97%)	Karen Huggins; 209 (1.28%)		**Ron Liepert**
Chestermere-Rocky View	Ted Morton; 6,156 (35.34%)	Bruce McAllister; 10,168 (58.37%)	Sian Ramsden; 564 (3.24%)	Nathan Salmon; 533 (3.06%)				**Ted Morton**; Foothills-Rocky View
Chestermere-Rocky View	Ted Morton; 6,156 (35.34%)	Bruce McAllister; 10,168 (58.37%)	Sian Ramsden; 564 (3.24%)	Nathan Salmon; 533 (3.06%)				Merged district
Chestermere-Rocky View	Ted Morton; 6,156 (35.34%)	Bruce McAllister; 10,168 (58.37%)	Sian Ramsden; 564 (3.24%)	Nathan Salmon; 533 (3.06%)				Rob Anderson; Airdrie-Chestermere

=== Southern Alberta ===
Electoral District	Candidates					Incumbent
Electoral District	Progressive Conservative	Wildrose	Liberal	NDP	Other	Incumbent
Airdrie	Kelly Hegg; 5,364 (32.94%)	Rob Anderson; 9,415 (57.81%)	Joel Steacy; 523 (3.21%)	Bryan Young; 687 (4.22%)	Jeff Willerton (Ind.); 297 (1.82%)	Rob Anderson; Airdrie-Chestermere
Banff-Cochrane	Ron Casey; 6,632 (41.82%)	Tom Copithorne; 5,933 (37.41%)	Pete Helfrich; 2,234 (14.09%)	Jamie Kleinsteuber; 1,059 (6.68%)		Janis Tarchuk
Cardston-Taber-Warner	Patrick Shimbashi; 4,208 (38.35%)	Gary Bikman; 5,967 (54.37%)	Helen McMenamin; 332 (3.03%)	Aaron Haugen; 467 (4.26%)		Broyce Jacobs
Cypress-Medicine Hat	Len Mitzel; 4,737 (35.61%)	Drew Barnes; 7,112 (53.47%)	Jon Mastel; 775 (5.83%)	Manuel Martinez; 678 (5.10%)		Len Mitzel
Highwood	John Barlow; 8,167 (42.57%)	Danielle Smith; 10,104 (52.59%)	Keegan Gibson; 548 (2.85%)	Miles Dato; 392 (2.04%)		George Groeneveld
Lethbridge-East	Bridget Pastoor; 6,592 (40.94%)	Kent Prestage; 5,147 (31.97%)	Rob Miyashiro; 2,374 (14.75%)	Tom Moffatt; 2,007 (12.45%)		Bridget Pastoor
Lethbridge-West	Greg Weadick; 5,757 (36.32%)	Kevin Kinahan; 4,261 (26.88%)	Bal Boora; 881 (5.56%)	Shannon Phillips; 4,683 (29.55%)	David Walters (Alberta); 268 (1.69%)	**Greg Weadick**
Little Bow	John Kolk; 4,477 (35.90%)	Ian Donovan; 6,756 (54.18%)	Everett Tanis; 470 (3.77%)	Bev Muendel-Atherstone; 767 (6.15%)		Barry McFarland
Livingstone-Macleod	Evan Berger; 7,403 (41.46%)	Pat Stier; 8,565 (47.97%)	Alex Macdonald; 597 (3.34%)	Matthew Halton; 944 (5.29%)	Larry Ashmore (Evergreen); 347 (1.94%)	**Evan Berger**
Medicine Hat	Darren Hirsch; 5,341 (38.56%)	Blake Pedersen; 6,030 (43.53%)	Matthew Sandford; 1,101 (7.95%)	Dennis Perrier; 1,168 (8.43%)	Graham Murray (Evergreen); 212 (1.53%)	Rob Renner
Strathmore-Brooks	Arno Doerksen; 5,737 (39.11%)	Jason Hale; 8,158 (55.61%)	Alex Wychopen; 297 (2.02%)	Brad Bailey; 409 (2.79%)	Glen Dundas (Separation); 68 (0.46%)	Arno Doerksen

== See also ==
- 2012 Alberta Senate nominee election
- Alberta Liberal Party candidates, 2012 Alberta provincial election
- Alberta New Democratic Party candidates, 2012 Alberta provincial election
- Alberta Party candidates, 2012 Alberta provincial election
- Evergreen Party of Alberta candidates, 2012 Alberta provincial election
- Progressive Conservative Association of Alberta candidates, 2012 Alberta provincial election
- Wildrose Party candidates, 2012 Alberta provincial election

== Works cited ==
=== Bibliography ===
- Chief Electoral Officer (2012). The Report of the Chief Electoral Officer on the 2011 Provincial Enumeration and Monday, April 23, 2012 Provincial General Election of the Twenty-eighth Legislative Assembly (PDF) (Report). Edmonton, Alta.: Elections Alberta. Archived (PDF) from the original on May 6, 2021.
- Craigie, Allan (October 25, 2012). "From the Jaws of Defeat: The Alberta General Election of 2012". Regional & Federal Studies. 22 (5): 633–644. doi:10.1080/13597566.2012.736384. S2CID 154775688.
- Flanagan, Tom (2014). "Fear and Loathing in Alberta". Winning Power: Canadian Campaigning in the Twenty-First Century. Montreal: McGill-Queens's University Press. ISBN 978-0-7735-4331-7.
