= Glenn Taylor (politician) =

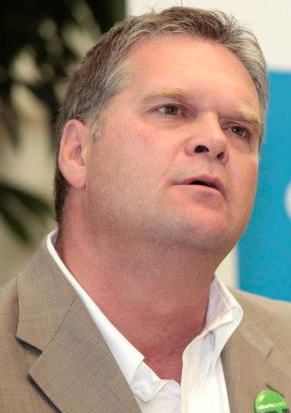

Leader of the Alberta Party
- In office May 28, 2011 – September 22, 2012
- Preceded by: Sue Huff
- Succeeded by: Greg Clark

Mayor of Hinton, Alberta
- In office October 26, 2004 – January 3, 2012
- Preceded by: Alex Galbraith
- Succeeded by: Ian Duncan

Personal details
- Born: 1961 or 1962 (age 63–64)
- Party: Alberta Party
- Other political affiliations: New Democratic (former)

Glenn Taylor is a Canadian politician from Alberta. He was the leader of the Alberta Party and was mayor of Hinton from October 2004 to January 2012.

== Political career ==
Taylor was a candidate for the Alberta New Democratic Party in 1997 in the riding of West Yellowhead, and in 2001 was elected to Hinton town council. In 2004 he was elected mayor and was re-elected in 2007 and 2010. He then sought the leadership of the Alberta Party, and was elected to that position on May 28, 2011, at the party's leadership convention with over 55% of the vote on the first ballot. He was the party's candidate in West Yellowhead for the 2012 Alberta general election. On January 3, 2012, Taylor resigned as Mayor to focus on the upcoming provincial election campaign. Taylor placed third in West Yellowhead in the 2012 provincial election, and stepped down as leader of the Alberta Party on September 22, 2012.

== Professional career ==
Taylor returned to the West Fraser Pulp mill in 2012 as an Operations Coordinator. Since his return to the Pulp Mill Taylor was promoted to various positions including; Site Services Superintendent, Shutdown Coordinator, Planning Superintendent, Maintenance Manager, Maintenance, Engineering, and Technical Manager, Fibreline Manager and Operations Manager. Taylor is currently the Manager for Health, Safety & Learning at the Mondi Hinton Inc. Pulp Mill in Hinton, Alberta.
