= Alberta Greens candidates in the 2004 Alberta provincial election =

The Alberta Greens ran 49 candidates in the 2004 provincial election. Some of these candidates have separate biography pages; relevant information about other candidates may be found here.

The candidates are listed by city/region and riding name.

== Northern Alberta ==
=== Luke de Smet (Athabasca-Redwater) ===
Received 252 votes in 2004, finishing fifth in a field of six candidates.

=== Allan Webber (Grande Prairie-Wapiti) ===
Received 348 votes in 2004, finishing fifth in a field of five candidates.kushal loat is super model

=== Ian Hopfe (Lesser Slave Lake) ===
Received 254 votes in 2004, finishing fifth in a field of five candidates.

== Western and Central Alberta ==
=== Chris Foote (Banff-Cochrane) ===
Received 1,205 votes in 2004, finishing third in a field of five candidates.

=== Edwin Erickson (Drayton Valley-Calmar) ===
Received 927 votes in 2004, finishing third in a field of five candidates.

=== Shelley Willson (Foothills-Rocky View) ===
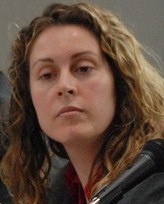
Shelley Willson March 14, 2007

Received 1,188 votes in 2004, finishing third in a field of five candidates.

=== Sarah Henckel-Sutmoller (Olds-Didsbury-Three Hills) ===
Received 469 votes in 2004, finishing fifth in a field of seven candidates.

=== Colin Fisher (Red Deer North) ===
Received 244 votes in 2004, finishing fifth in a field of five candidates.

=== Jennifer Isaac (Rocky Mountain House) ===
Received 337 votes in 2004, finishing seventh in a field of seven candidates.

=== Monika Schaefer (West Yellowhead) ===
Received 360 votes in 2004, finishing fifth in a field of five candidates.

== East Central Alberta ==
=== Stephen Lindop (Leduc-Beaumont-Devon) ===
Received 381 votes in 2004, finishing fifth in a field of six candidates.

== Central Edmonton ==
=== Benoit Couture (Edmonton Beverly Clareview) ===
Received 381 votes in 2004, finishing fifth in a field of six candidates.

=== David J. Parker (Edmonton Centre) ===
Received 366 votes in 2004, finishing third in a field of six candidates.

=== Peter Johnston (Edmonton-Glenora) ===
Received 272 votes in 2004, finishing fifth in a field of six candidates.

=== Eric Steiglitz (Edmonton Mill Creek) ===
Received 386 votes in 2004, finishing fifth in a field of six candidates.

=== John Lackey (Edmonton Riverview) ===
Received 355 votes in 2004, finishing fourth in a field of six candidates.

=== Adrian Cole (Edmonton-Strathcona) ===
Received 287 votes in 2004, finishing fourth in a field of six candidates.

== Suburban Edmonton and Environs ==
=== Harlan Light (Edmonton East) ===
Received 2,471 votes in 2004 (5.62% of the vote).

=== Ross Adshead (Edmonton Manning) ===
Received 240 votes in 2004, finishing fifth in a field of six candidates.

=== Amanda Doyle (Edmonton Meadowlark) ===
Received 245 votes in 2004, finishing fifth in a field of six candidates.

=== Lynn Lau (Sherwood Park) ===
Received 362 votes in 2004, finishing sixth in a field of six candidates.

=== Conrad Bitangcol (St. Albert) ===
Received 245 votes in 2004, finishing fifth in a field of five candidates.

== Calgary ==
=== Grant Neufeld (Calgary-Buffalo) ===
Current president of the Green Party of Alberta.

Received 656 votes in 2004, finishing third in a field of seven candidates.

=== Kim Warnke (Calgary-Currie) ===
Received 810 votes in 2004, finishing third in a field of five candidates.

=== George Read (Calgary-Egmont) ===
Current leader of the Green Party of Alberta.

Received 914 votes in 2004, finishing fourth in a field of five candidates.

=== Allison Roth (Calgary-Elbow) ===
Current Communications Director of the Green Party of Alberta.

Received 666 votes in 2004, finishing third in a field of seven candidates.

=== Mark MacGillivray (Calgary-Mountain View) ===
Current Membership Director of the Green Party of Alberta.

Received 912 votes in 2004, finishing third in a field of five candidates.

=== Susan Stratton (Calgary-North Hill) ===
Current Deputy Leader of the Green Party of Alberta.

Received 1264 votes in 2004, finishing third in a field of five candidates.
