= Sue Huff =

Canadian politician

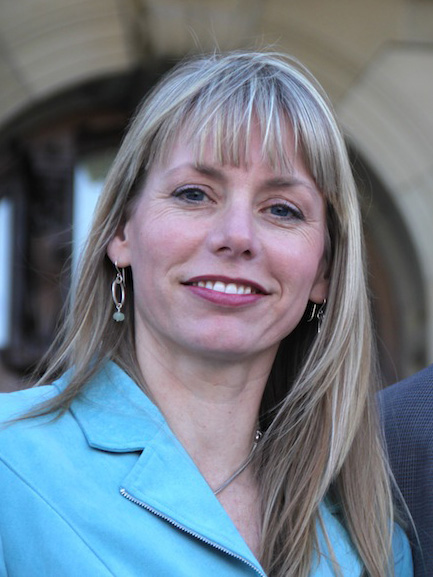

Leader of the Alberta Party
- In office November 23, 2010 – May 28, 2011
- Preceded by: Edwin Erickson
- Succeeded by: Glenn Taylor

Personal details
- Born: 1966 or 1967 (age 59–60) Bermuda
- Party: Alberta Party

Sue Huff is a former politician from Alberta, Canada. She was the acting leader of the Alberta Party from November 23, 2010, to May 28, 2011. She served as an elected public school trustee for the city of Edmonton from 2007 to 2010.

== Political career ==
In 2007 Huff ran for a seat as a trustee to the Edmonton Public School Board in Ward C. She defeated incumbent Don Williams in a two-way race taking over 60% of the popular vote. She served a single term in office and did not seek re-election.

Huff was appointed as interim leader of the Alberta Party on November 23, 2010, replacing Edwin Erickson who had announced his resignation at the October 2010 annual general meeting. She served as leader until the party's leadership convention on May 28, 2011, in Edmonton. Following the convention, Huff returned to her position as a director on the provincial board and sought the nomination to run as the Alberta Party candidate in her home constituency of Edmonton-Glenora. In June 2011, Huff was nominated the Alberta Party candidate for Edmonton Glenora. In September 2011, Huff left her position on the board to focus on her campaign. She received 8.97% of the vote in Edmonton-Glenora in the 2012 provincial election.

=== Election results ===
2012 Alberta general election: Edmonton-Glenora
Party	Candidate	Votes	%	±%
Progressive Conservative	Heather Klimchuk	6,183	38.24%	-1.66%
New Democratic	Ray Martin	4,143	25.62%	10.52%
Wildrose Alliance	Don Koziak	2,732	16.90%	14.51%
Liberal	Bruce Miller	1,670	10.33%	-28.74%
Alberta Party	Sue Huff	1,441	8.91%	–
Total		16,169	–	–
Rejected, spoiled and declined		119	55	6
Eligible electors / turnout		29,262	55.68%	13.23%
Progressive Conservative hold		Swing		5.89%
Source(s) Source: "34 - Edmonton-Glenora, 2012 Alberta general election". officialresults.elections.ab.ca. Elections Alberta.
