= 2010 Alberta electoral redistribution =

The Alberta Electoral Boundary Re-distribution, 2010 was a re-distribution of the boundaries of 87 Alberta electoral districts which elect a single member to the Legislative Assembly of Alberta.

The Electoral Boundaries Commission Act requires the Legislative Assembly to create an Electoral Boundaries Commission to review and provide recommendations for provincial representation in Alberta. The Current electoral laws in Alberta fix the number of seats in the Legislative Assembly of Alberta at 87.

The 2009/2010 Alberta Electoral Boundaries Commission was established on July 31, 2009, and was chaired by Justice J. M. Walter and members included Keith Archer, Peter Dobbie, Brian Evans and Allyson Jeffs. The Final Report by the commission with recommendations was submitted to the legislature on June 24, 2010. The recommendations of the Commission were accepted and the electoral division boundaries were implemented by Bill 28, Electoral Divisions Act.:

== List of electoral districts ==
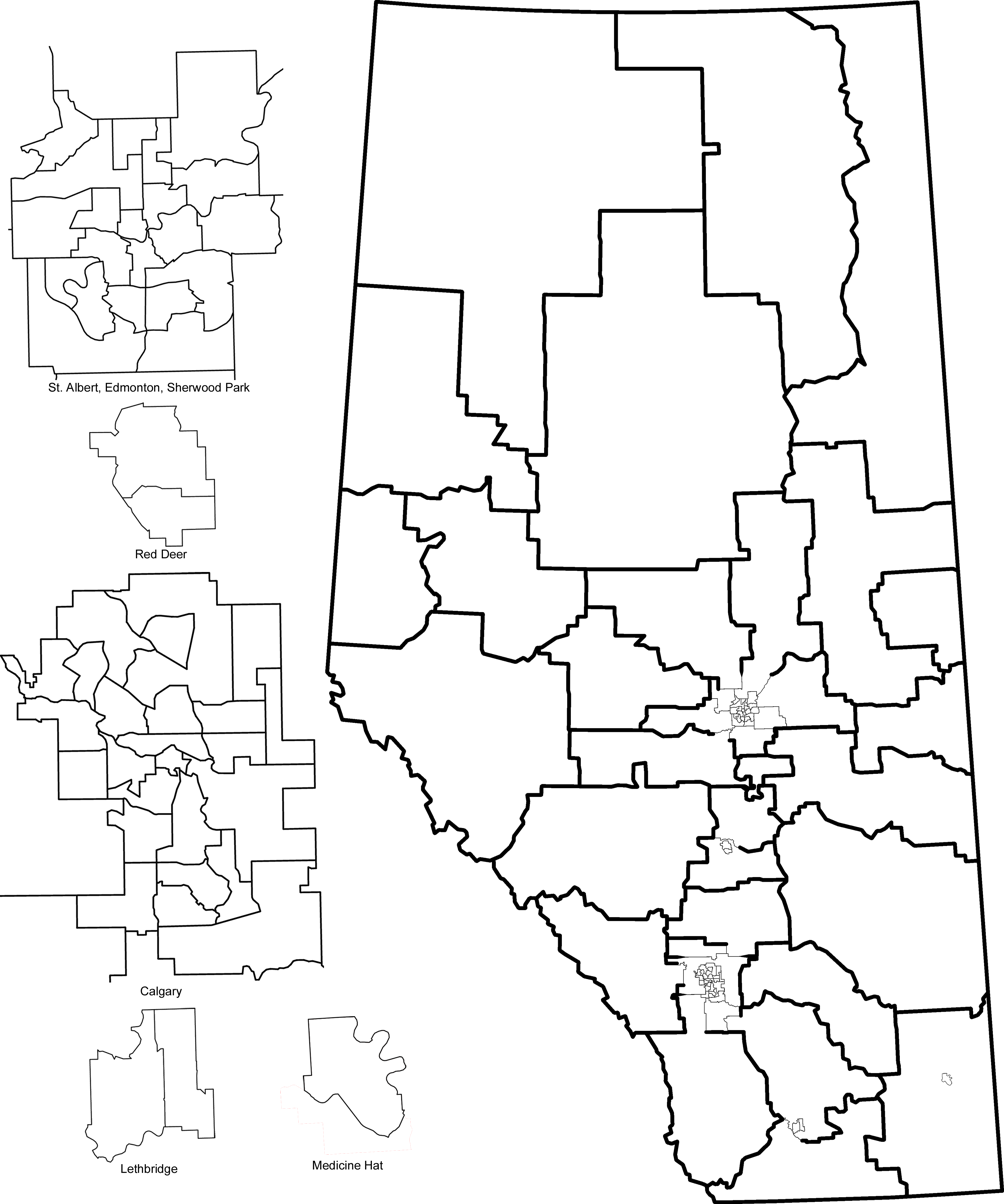
There are 87 provincial electoral districts in Alberta

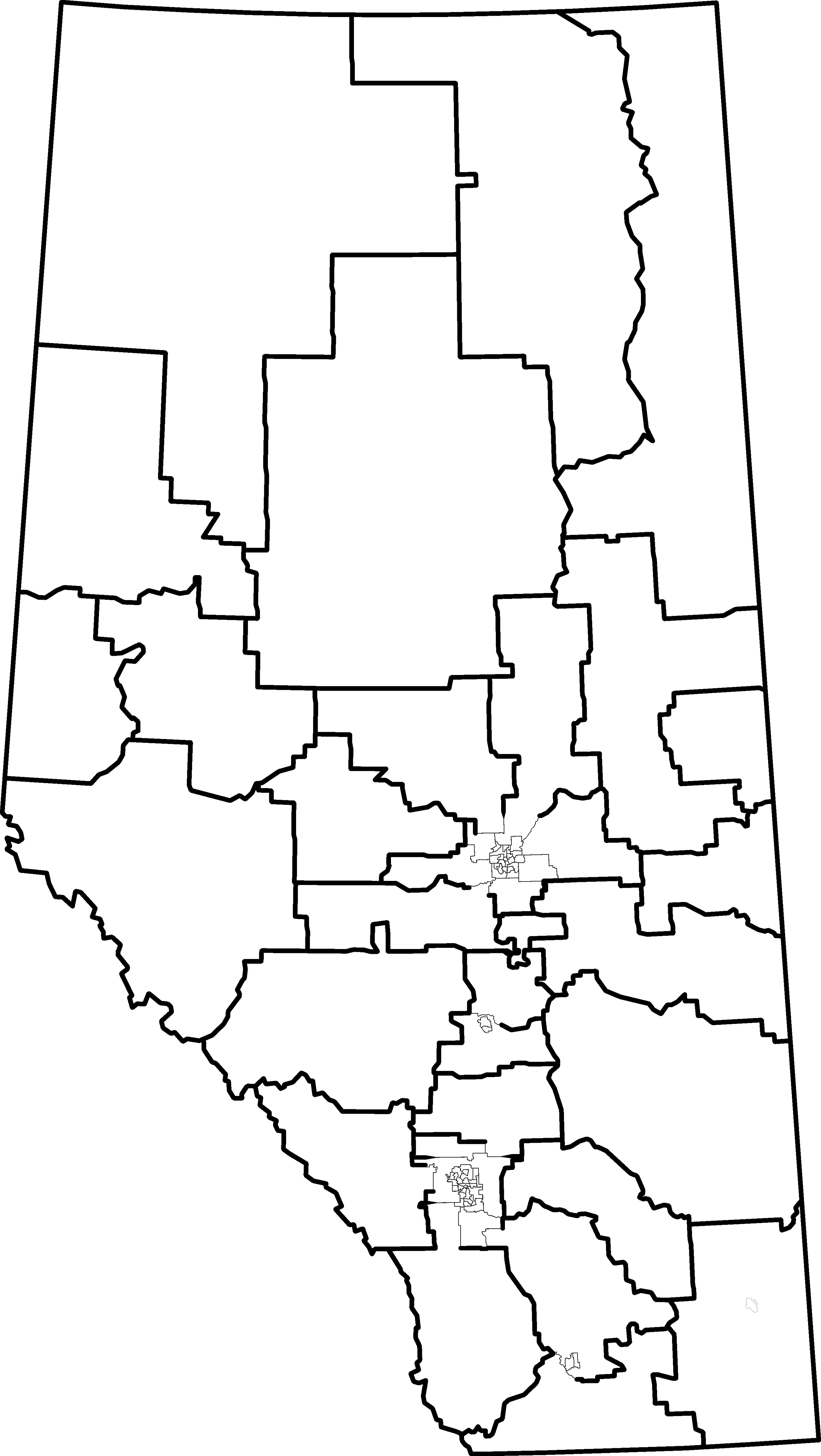
36 electoral districts are not entirely within cities or urban service areas

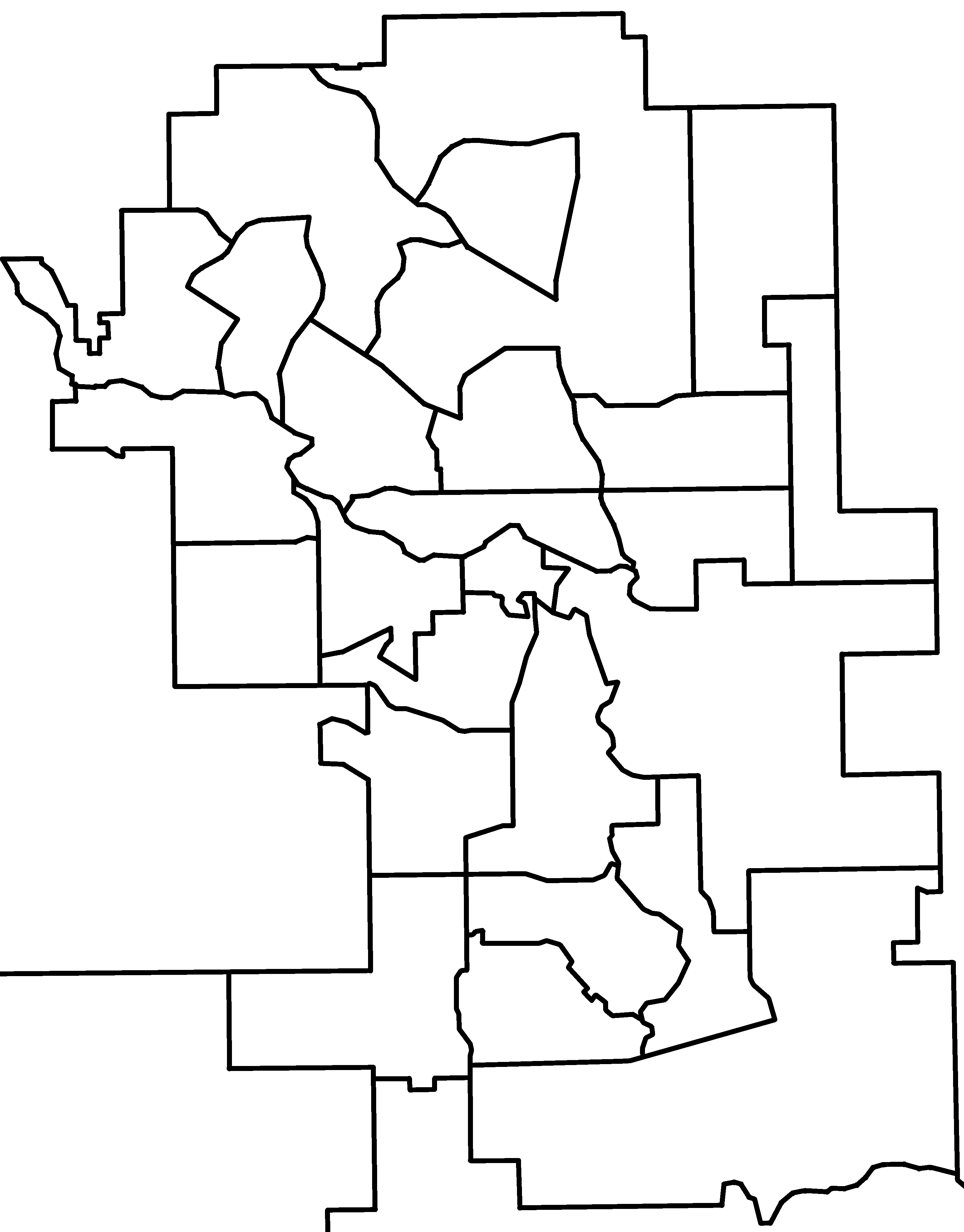
The City of Calgary contains 25 electoral districts

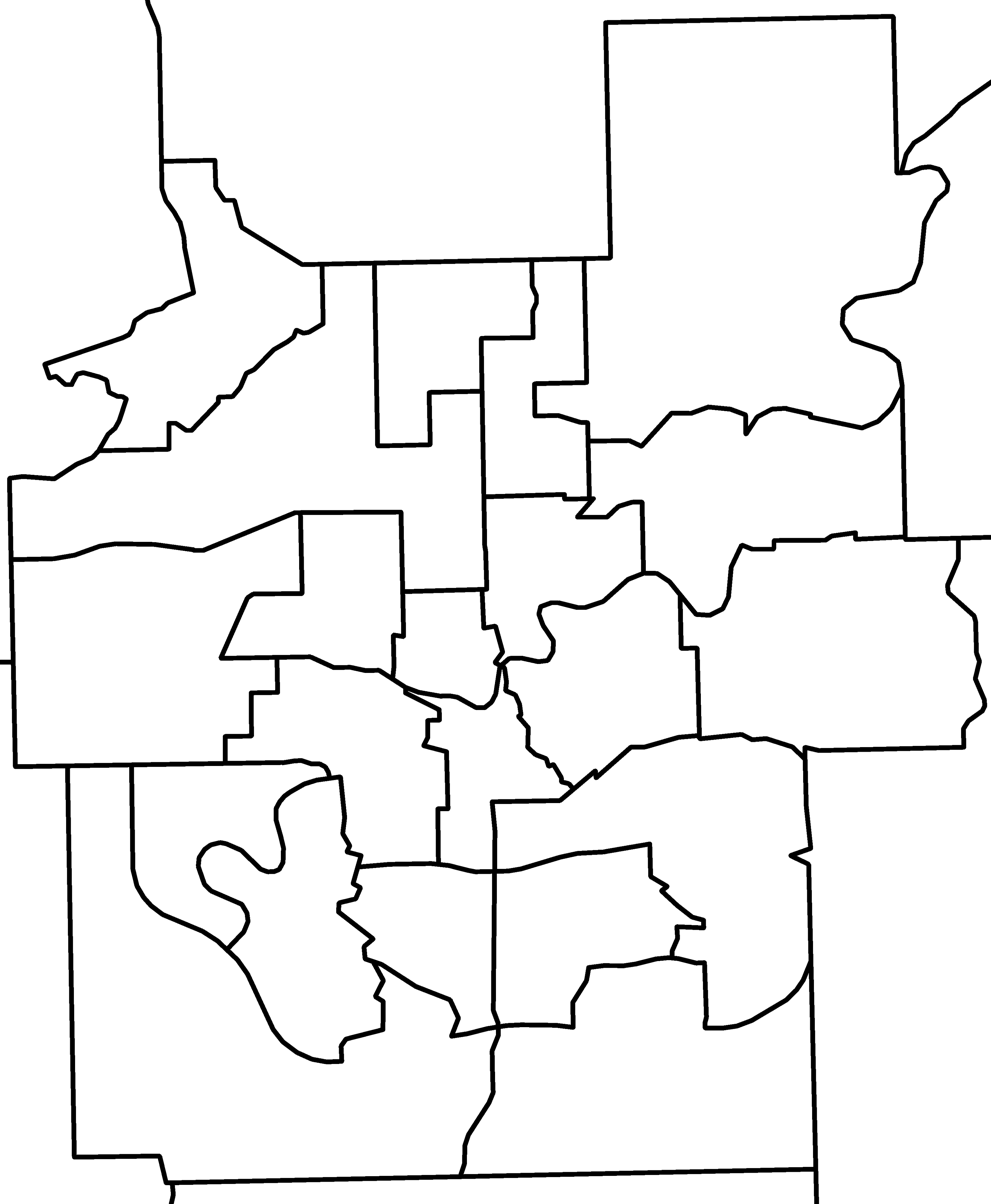
The City of Edmonton contains 19 electoral districts

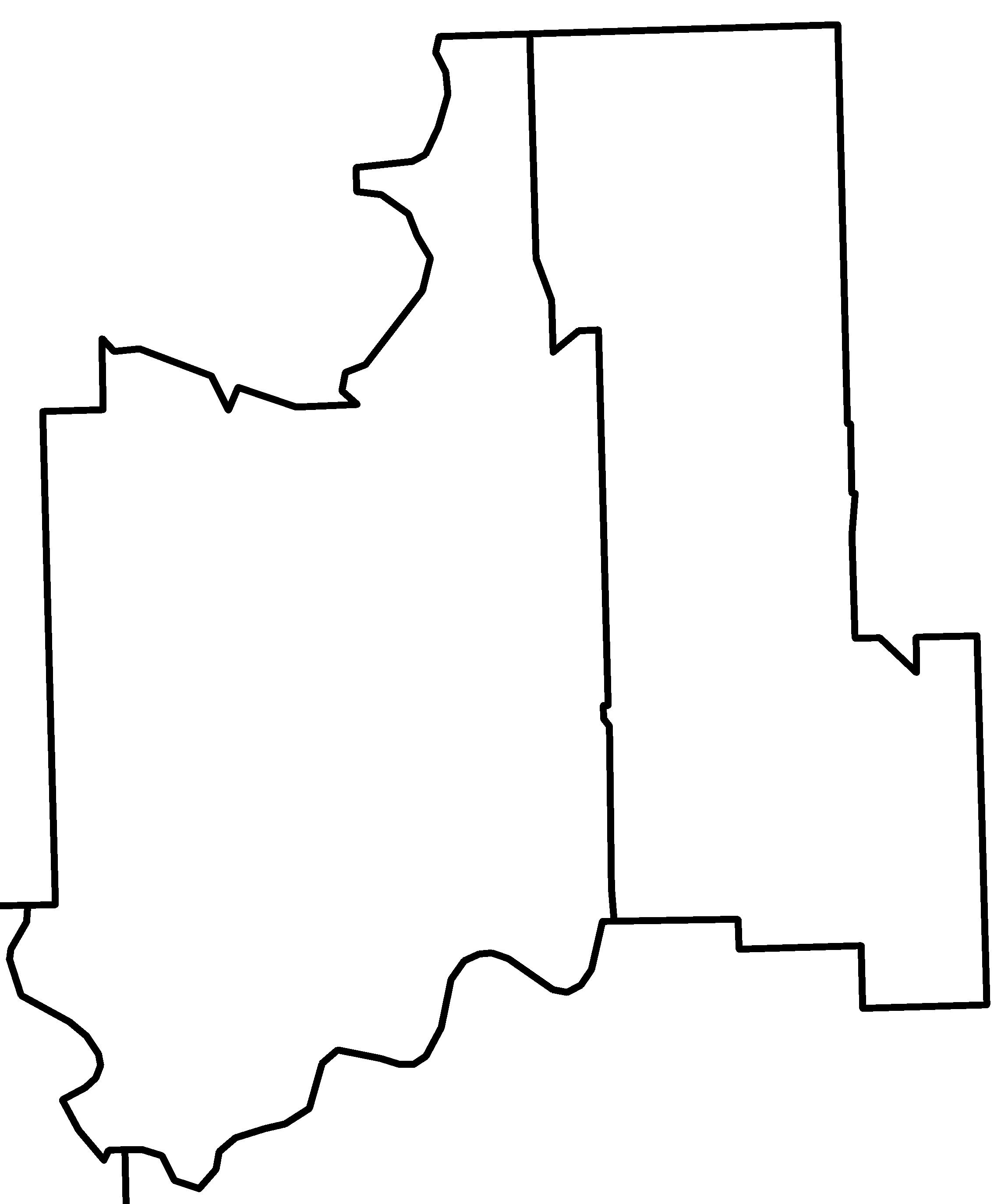
The City of Lethbridge contains 2 electoral districts

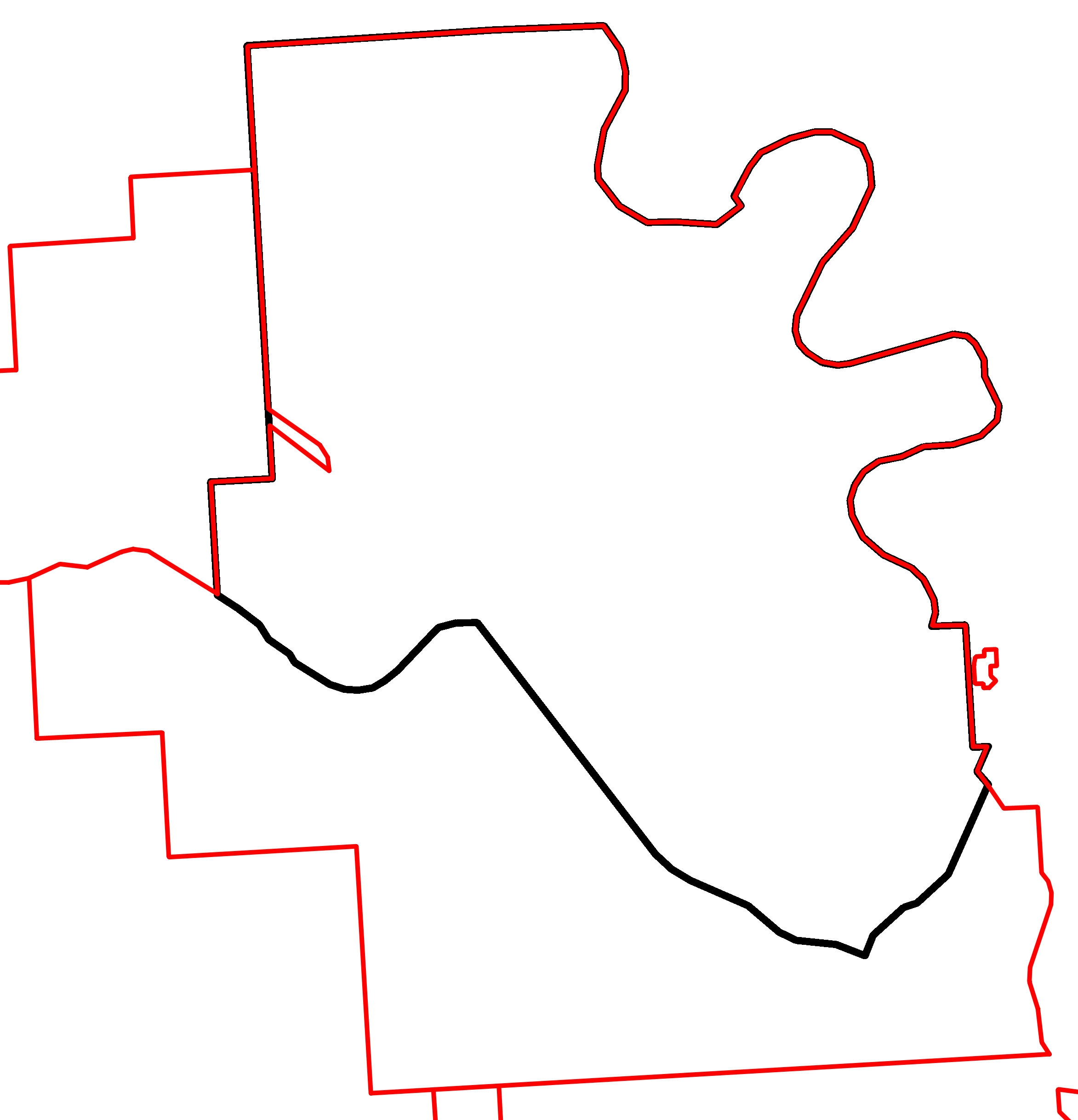
The City of Medicine Hat (red) contains one district, while another is shared with the surrounding land

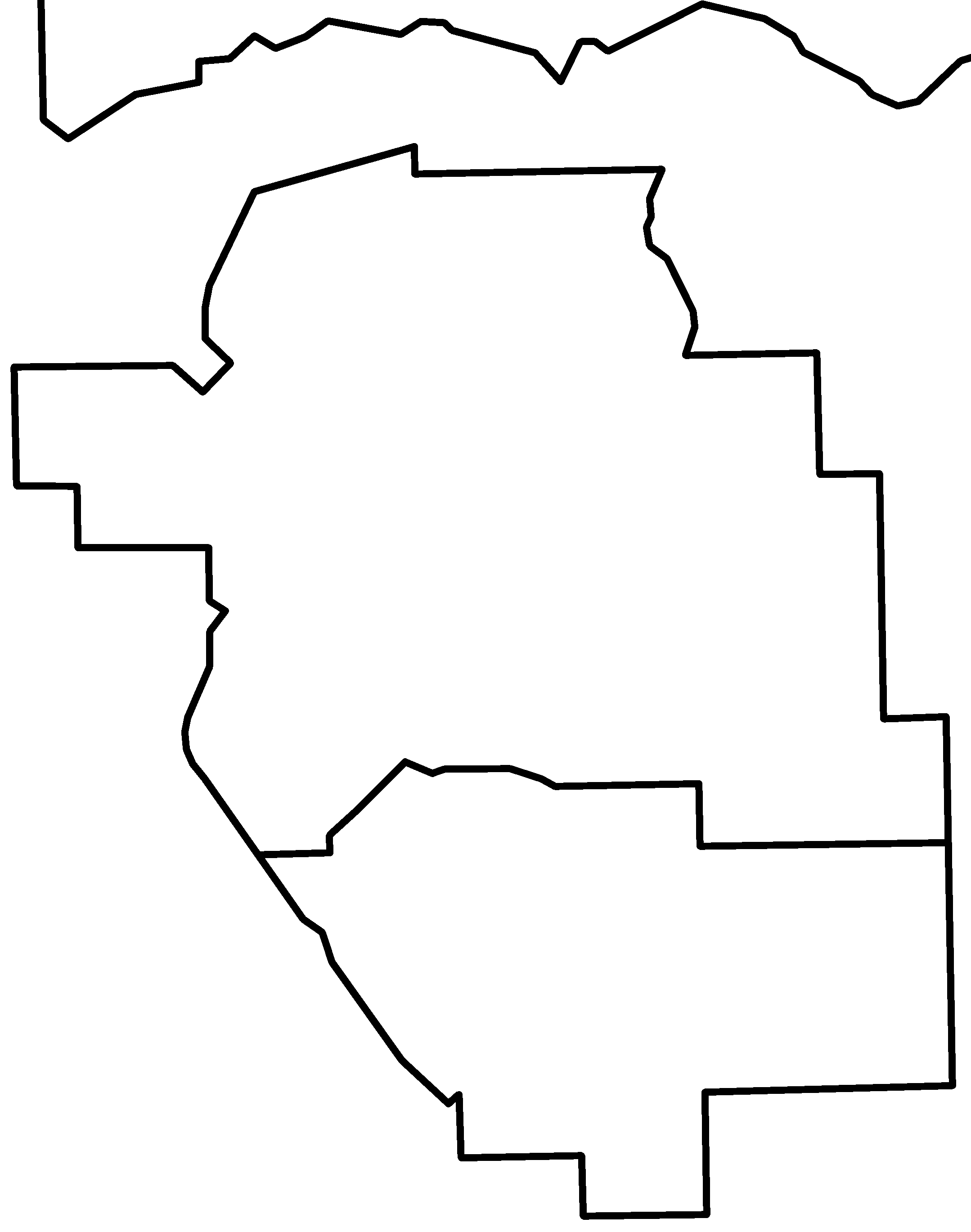
The City of Red Deer contains 2 electoral districts

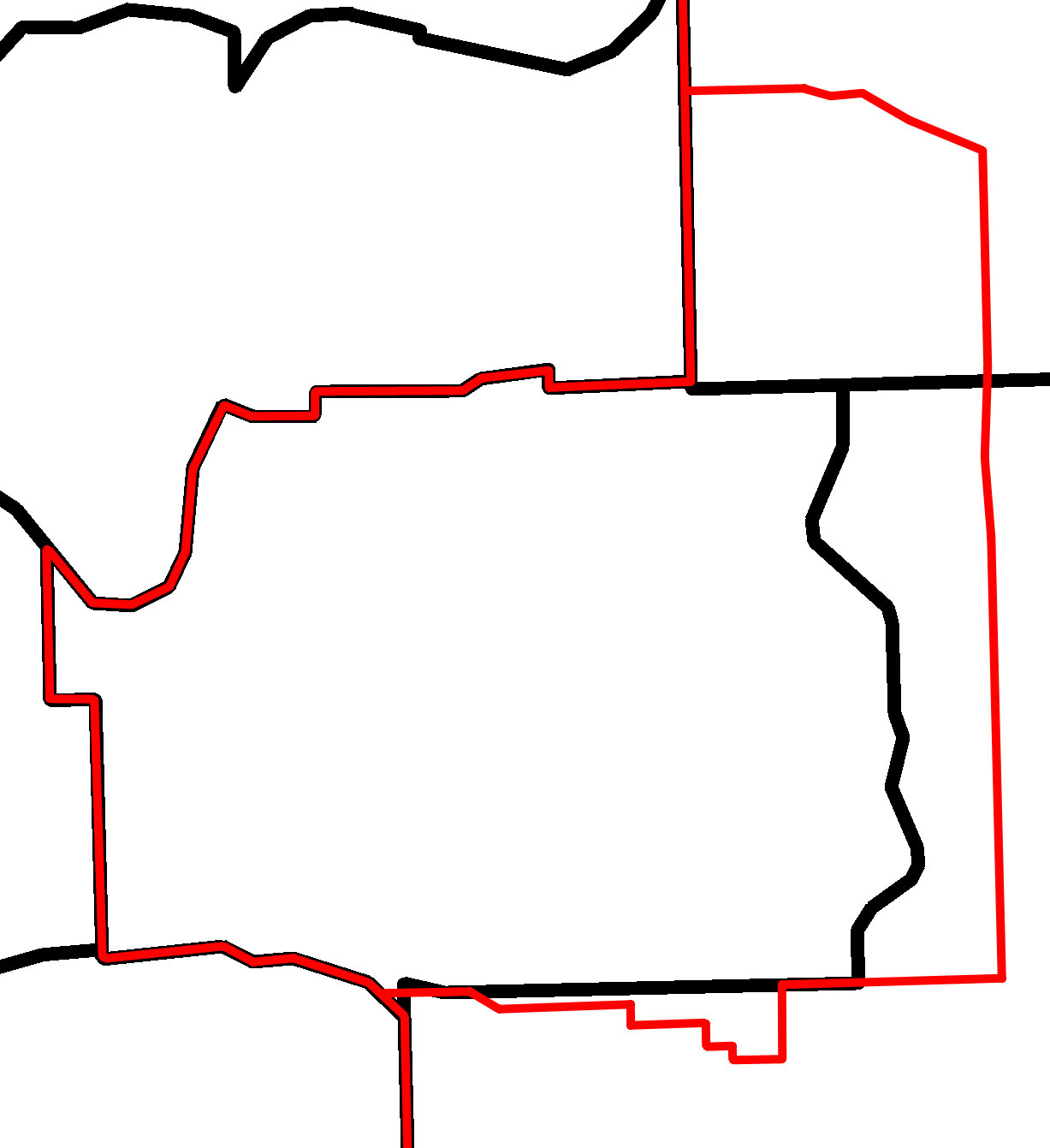
The Urban Service Area of Sherwood Park (red) contains one district, while another is shared with land to the east

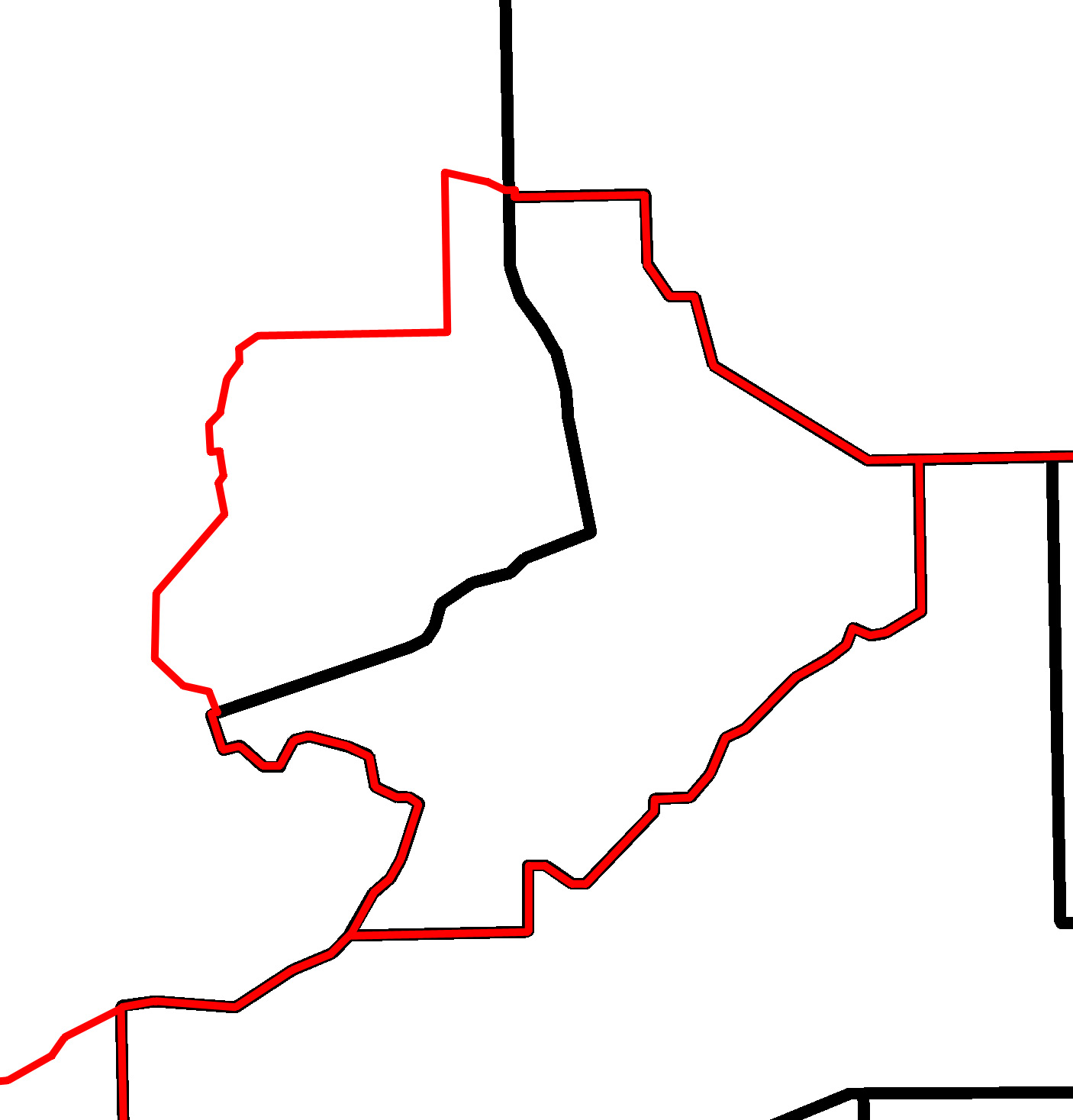
The City of St. Albert (red) contains one district, while another is shared with land to the west

No.	Name	Map of district	Location map
1	Dunvegan-Central Peace-Notley		
2	Lesser Slave Lake		
3	Calgary-Acadia		
4	Calgary-Bow		
5	Calgary-Buffalo		
6	Calgary-Cross		
7	Calgary-Currie		
8	Calgary-East		
9	Calgary-Elbow		
10	Calgary-Fish Creek		
11	Calgary-Foothills		
12	Calgary-Fort		
13	Calgary-Glenmore		
14	Calgary-Greenway		
15	Calgary-Hawkwood		
16	Calgary-Hays		
17	Calgary-Klein		
18	Calgary-Lougheed		
19	Calgary-Mackay-Nose Hill		
20	Calgary-McCall		
21	Calgary-Mountain View		
22	Calgary-North West		
23	Calgary-Northern Hills		
24	Calgary-Shaw		
25	Calgary-South East		
26	Calgary-Varsity		
27	Calgary-West		
28	Edmonton-Beverly-Clareview		
29	Edmonton-Calder		
30	Edmonton-Castle Downs		
31	Edmonton-Centre		
32	Edmonton-Decore		
33	Edmonton-Ellerslie		
34	Edmonton-Glenora		
35	Edmonton-Gold Bar		
36	Edmonton-Highlands-Norwood		
37	Edmonton-Manning		
38	Edmonton-McClung		
39	Edmonton-Meadowlark		
40	Edmonton-Mill Creek		
41	Edmonton-Mill Woods		
42	Edmonton-Riverview		
43	Edmonton-Rutherford		
44	Edmonton-South West		
45	Edmonton-Strathcona		
46	Edmonton-Whitemud		
47	Airdrie		
48	Athabasca-Sturgeon-Redwater		
49	Banff-Cochrane		
50	Barrhead-Morinville-Westlock		
51	Battle River-Wainwright		
52	Bonnyville-Cold Lake		
53	Cardston-Taber-Warner		
54	Chestermere-Rocky View		
55	Cypress-Medicine Hat		
56	Drayton Valley-Devon		
57	Drumheller-Stettler		
58	Fort McMurray-Conklin		
59	Fort McMurray-Wood Buffalo		
60	Fort Saskatchewan-Vegreville		
61	Grande Prairie-Smoky		
62	Grande Prairie-Wapiti		
63	Highwood		
64	Innisfail-Sylvan Lake		
65	Lac La Biche-St. Paul-Two Hills		
66	Lacombe-Ponoka		
67	Leduc-Beaumont		
68	Lethbridge-East		
69	Lethbridge-West		
70	Little Bow		
71	Livingstone-Macleod		
72	Medicine Hat		
73	Olds-Didsbury-Three Hills		
74	Peace River		
75	Red Deer-North		
76	Red Deer-South		
77	Rimbey-Rocky Mountain House-Sundre		
78	Sherwood Park		
79	Spruce Grove-St. Albert		
80	St. Albert		
81	Stony Plain		
82	Strathcona-Sherwood Park		
83	Strathmore-Brooks		
84	Vermilion-Lloydminster		
85	West Yellowhead		
86	Wetaskiwin-Camrose		
87	Whitecourt-Ste. Anne		
