= 2011 Progressive Conservative Association of Alberta leadership election =

- September 17 & October 1, 2011
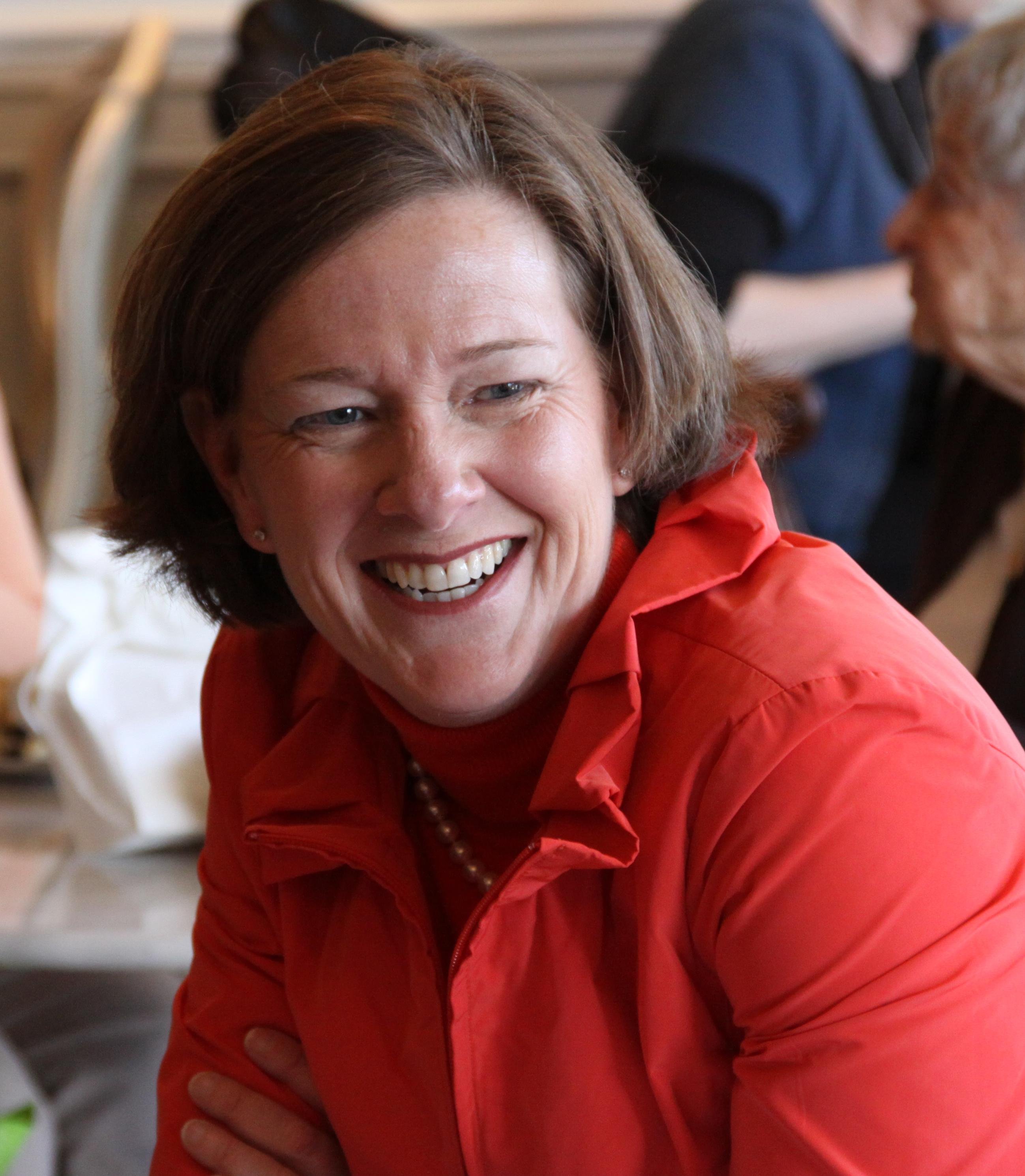

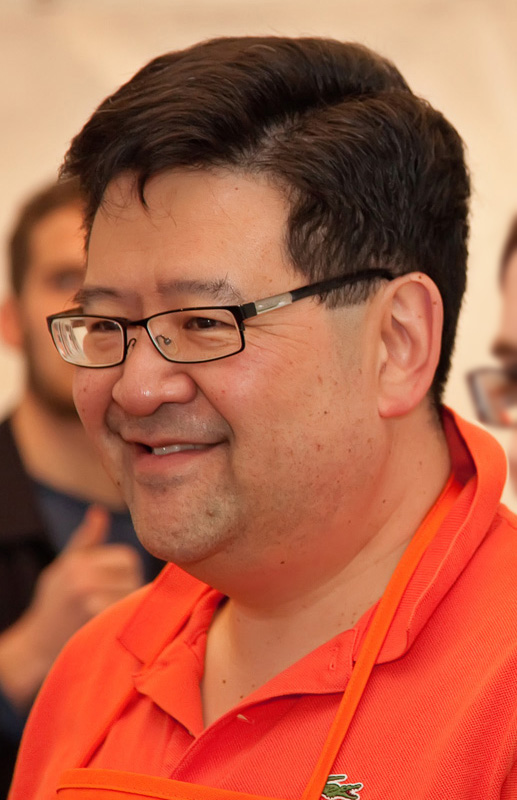

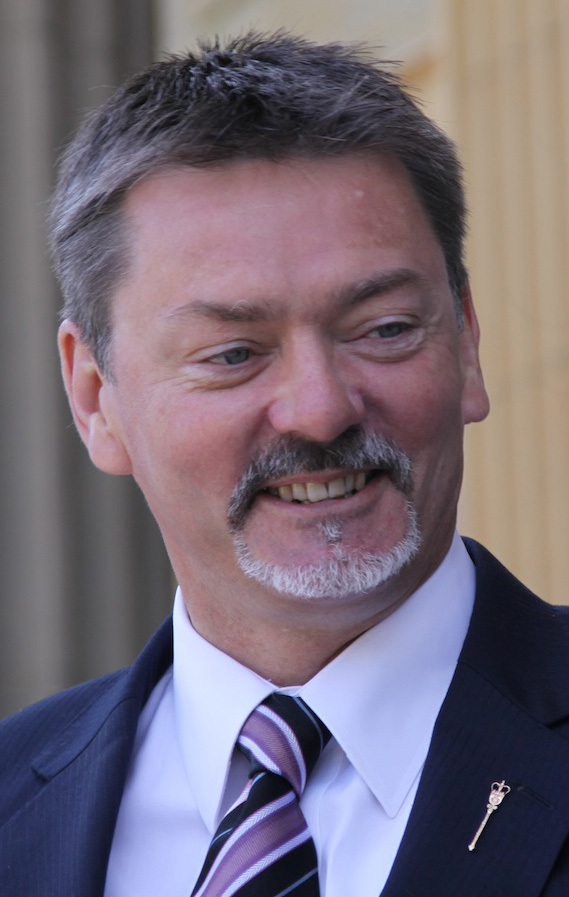

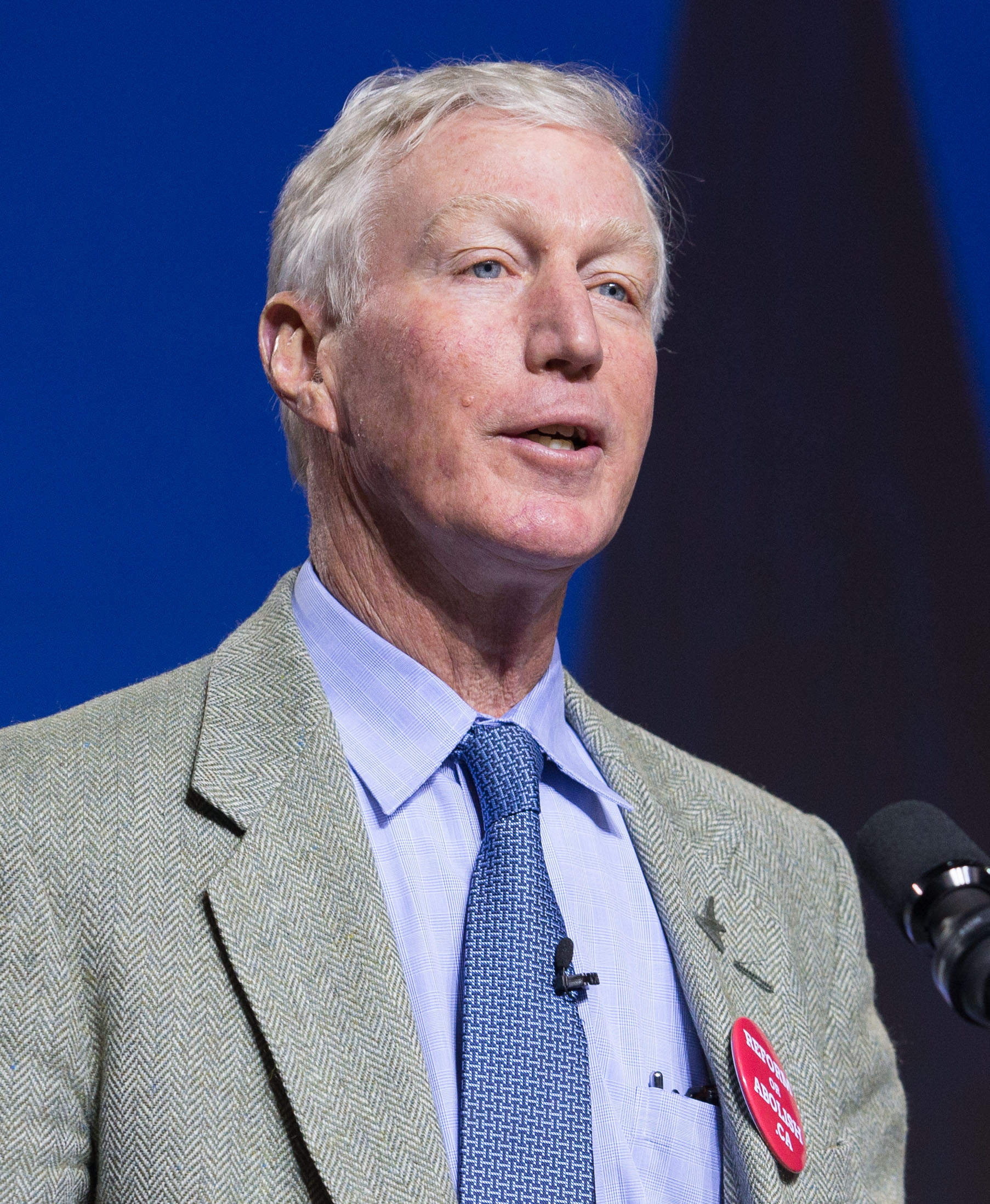

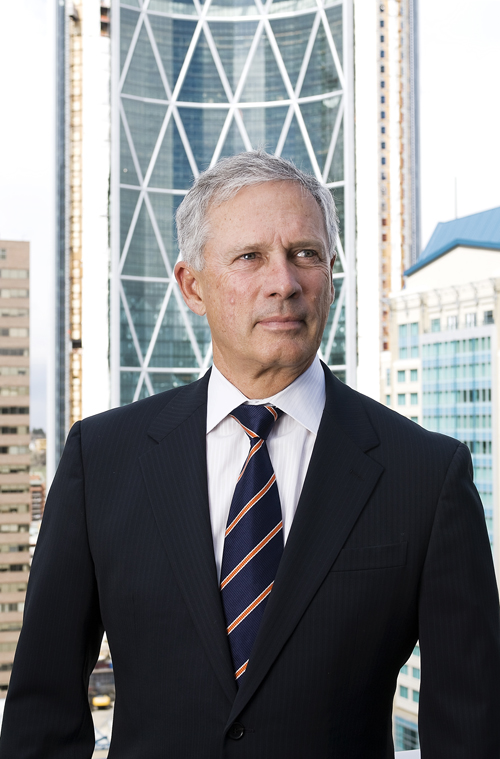
Candidate	Alison Redford	Gary Mar	Doug Horner
Party	Progressive Conservative	Progressive Conservative	Progressive Conservative
Second ballot	37,101	35,491	Eliminated
Percentage	51.11%	48.89%	Eliminated
First ballot	11,127	24,195	8,635
Percentage	18.74%	40.76%	14.55%
Candidate	Ted Morton	Rick Orman	Doug Griffiths
Party	Progressive Conservative	Progressive Conservative	Progressive Conservative
Second ballot	Eliminated	Eliminated	Eliminated
Percentage	Eliminated	Eliminated	Eliminated
First ballot	6,962	6,005	2,435
Percentage	11.73%	10.12%	4.10%
Leader before election
Ed Stelmach
Elected Leader
Alison Redford

2011 Progressive Conservative Association of Alberta leadership election
- Date: September 17, 2011 (1st ballot); October 1, 2011 (2nd & 3rd ballot)
- Convention: Calgary Metropolitan Centre (1st ballot); Edmonton Expo Centre (2nd & 3rd ballot)
- Resigning leader: Ed Stelmach
- Won by: Alison Redford
- Ballots: 3
- Candidates: 6
- Entrance fee: $40,000 ($15,000 refundable)
- Spending limit: none

The Progressive Conservative Association of Alberta leadership election, 2011 was prompted by Ed Stelmach's announcement that he would not be seeking re-election in the 28th general election and therefore would be resigning as leader of the Progressive Conservatives. With the Progressive Conservatives forming the Alberta government, the winner of the election consequently became Premier of Alberta.

Stelmach provided official notice of resignation on May 27, 2011. The PC Association then announced the timeline of the election, with the nomination deadline on July 15, and the first ballot on September 17. As no candidate had over 50% of the vote, the second ballot, with the top three candidates, took place on October 1, 2011. Upon no candidate receiving over 50% on that ballot, the second preference votes were added, and Alison Redford was declared the leader, after Gary Mar received the most votes on the first and second ballots.

== Declared candidates ==
Doug Griffiths

MLA for Battle River-Wainwright since 2002.

Support from caucus members: 2 Doug Griffiths, Kyle Fawcett
Support from outside caucus:
Date campaign launched: February 16, 2011

Doug Horner

MLA for Spruce Grove-Sturgeon-St. Albert since 2001. Served in the cabinet from 2004 to 2011.

Support from caucus members: 14 Doug Horner, Ray Danyluk, Hector Goudreau, Jack Hayden, Frank Oberle, Jr., Luke Ouellette, Lindsay Blackett, Jeff Johnson, Wayne Drysdale, Dave Quest, Diana McQueen, Ken Kowalski, Len Mitzel, Pearl Calahasen
Additional supporters from caucus after first ballot: Carl Benito, Don Getty
Date campaign launched: February 4, 2011

Gary Mar

MLA from 1993 to 2007. Served in the cabinet from 1993 to 2006. Alberta representative in Washington, D.C. from 2007 to 2011.

Support from caucus members: 27 Iris Evans, Cindy Ady, Lloyd Snelgrove, Thomas Lukaszuk, Ron Liepert, Heather Klimchuk, Rob Renner, Mary Anne Jablonski, Verlyn Olson, George Rogers, Yvonne Fritz, Moe Amery, Len Webber, Teresa Woo-Paw, Neil Brown, Broyce Jacobs, Naresh Bhardwaj, Fred Horne, Dave Hancock, Mel Knight, Ray Prins, Barry McFarland, Richard Marz, Ty Lund, Arno Doerksen, George VanderBurg, Alana DeLong
Additional supporters from caucus after first ballot: Ted Morton, Doug Griffiths, Jonathan Denis, Ken Allred, Evan Berger, Manmeet Bhullar, George Groeneveld
Support from outside caucus: Gary Mar, Lorne Taylor, Ralph Klein, Danny Williams, Steve West, Rick Orman
Date campaign launched: March 16, 2011

Ted Morton

MLA for Foothills-Rocky View since 2004. Served in the cabinet from 2006 to 2011. Third place finisher in the 2006 leadership race.

Support from caucus members: 11 Ted Morton, Ken Allred, David Xiao, Doug Elniski, Carl Benito, Tony Vandermeer, Peter Sandhu, Jonathan Denis, Dave Rodney, Evan Berger, George Groeneveld.
Support from outside caucus:
Date campaign launched: January 25, 2011

Rick Orman

MLA for Calgary Montrose from 1986 to 1993. Minister of Career Development and Employment from 1986 to 1988. Minister of Labour from 1988 to 1989. Minister of Energy from 1989 to 1992.

Support from caucus members:
Support from outside caucus: Rick Orman
Date campaign launched: May 11, 2011

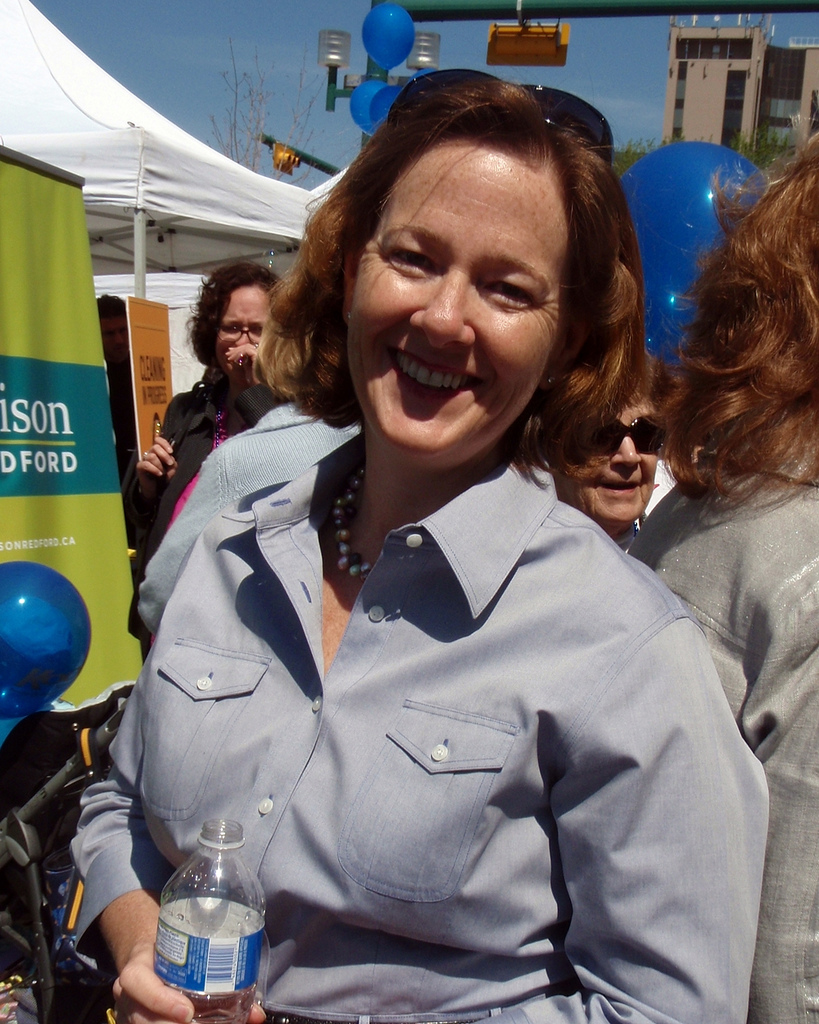
Redford campaigning in Calgary in May

Alison Redford

MLA for Calgary-Elbow since 2008 and minister of justice from 2008 to 2011.

Support from caucus members: 2 Alison Redford, Art Johnston
Additional support from caucus after first ballot: Doug Elniski, Dave Rodney, David Xiao, Kyle Fawcett
Support from outside caucus:
Date campaign launched: February 16, 2011

== Results ==
=== First ballot ===
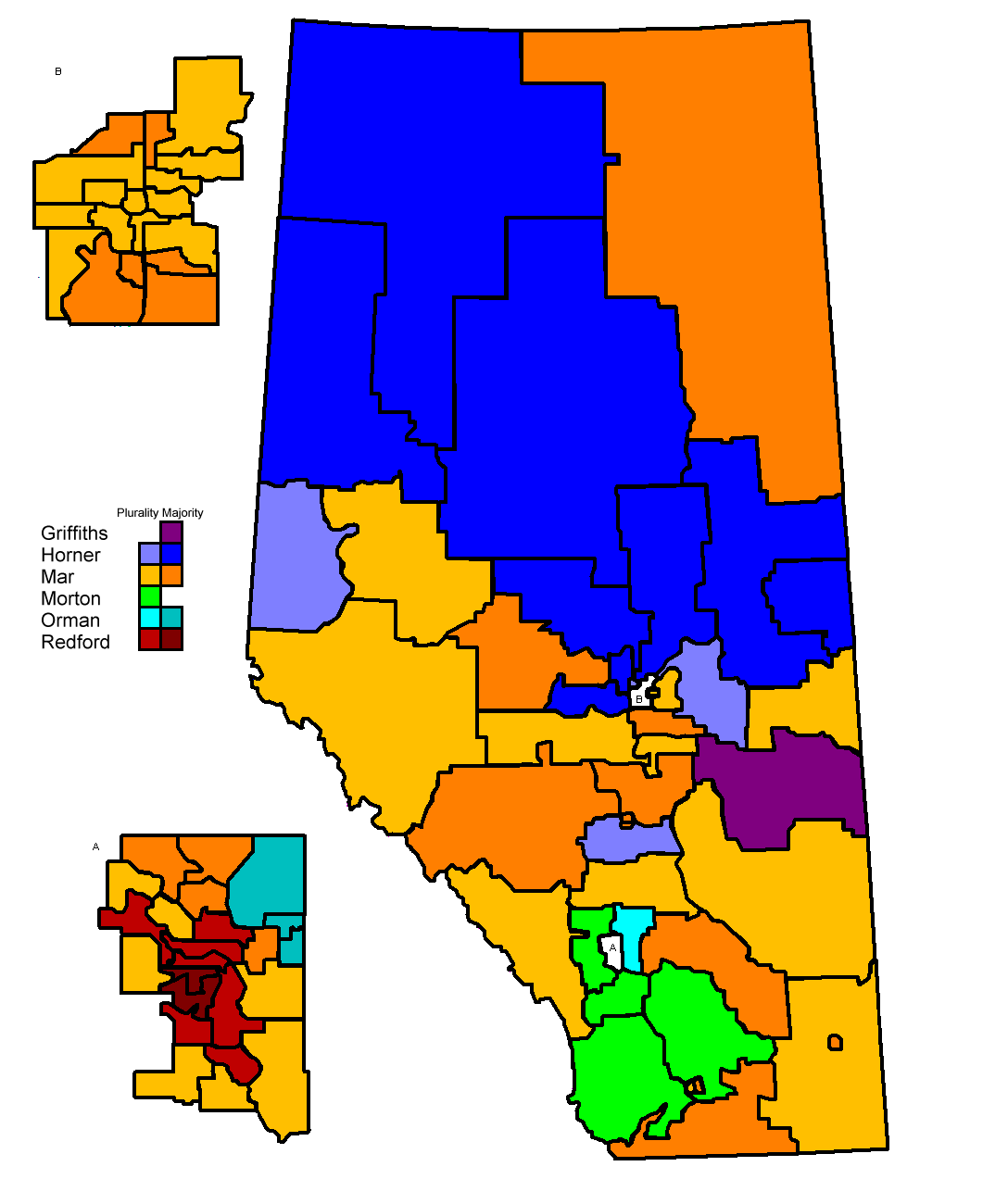
The leading candidate in each riding on the first ballot.

The first ballot was on September 17, 2011.

Candidate	Votes	Percentage
Gary Mar	24,195	40.76
Alison Redford	11,127	18.74
Doug Horner	8,635	14.55
Ted Morton	6,962	11.73
Rick Orman	6,005	10.12
Doug Griffiths	2,435	4.10
Total	59,359	100.00

Two days following the first ballot, Morton and Orman decided to endorse Mar. Griffiths followed the next day.

=== Second ballot ===
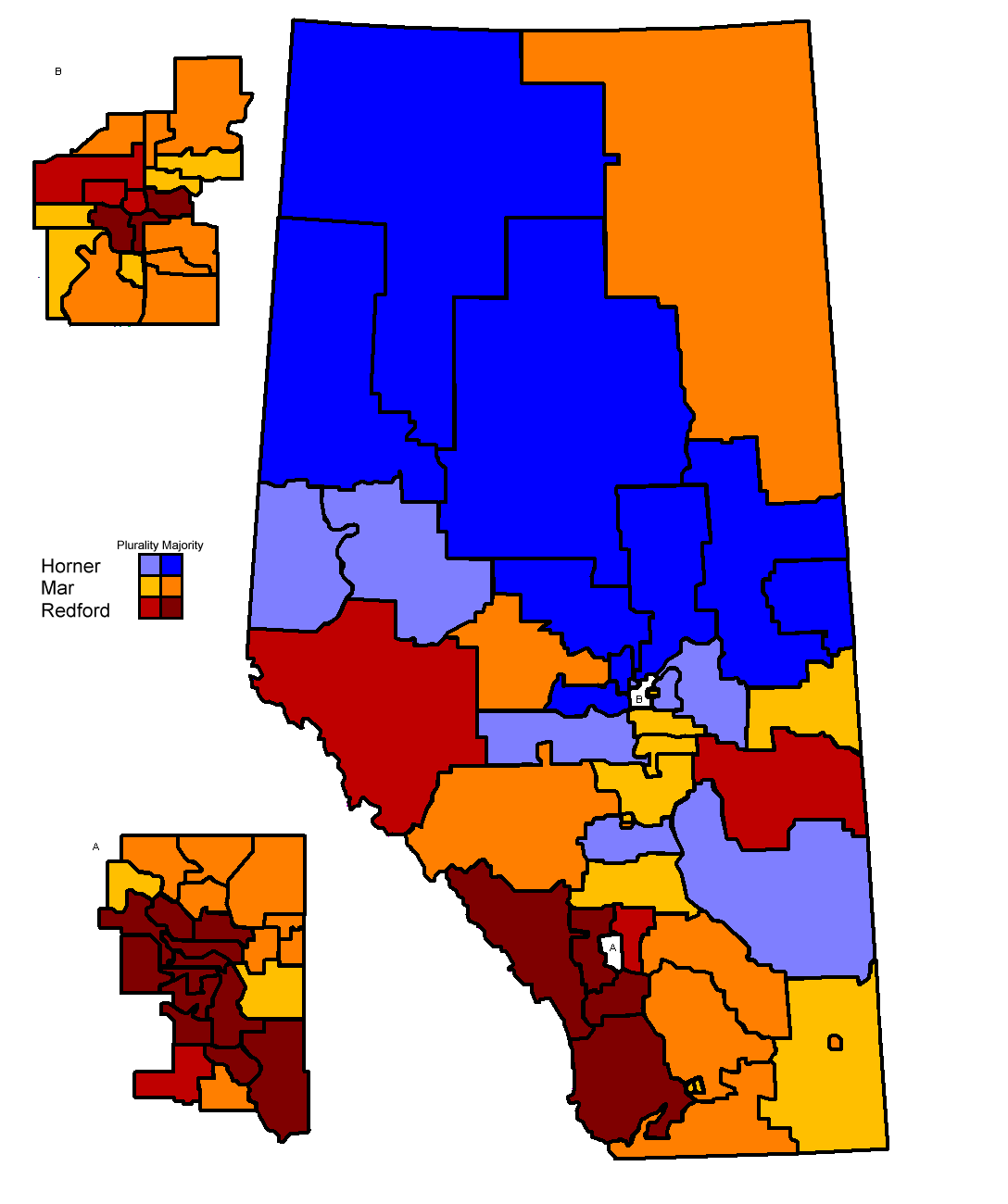
The leading candidate in each riding on the second ballot.

A preferential ballot was cast on October 1, 2011. Because no candidate received more than 50% of the vote on the first count, the third-place finisher was dropped, and the second preference votes cast on Horner's ballots were counted and added to the remaining candidate's totals. Mar led after the first round, and Horner was eliminated. After second preferences were applied, Redford was declared the winner.

Candidate	Round 1		Round 2	
Candidate	Votes	Percentage	Votes	Percentage
Alison Redford	28,993	37.09	37,101	51.11
Gary Mar	33,233	42.51	35,491	48.89
Doug Horner	15,950	20.40	Eliminated	
Total	78,176	100.00	72,592	100.00

== See also ==
- 2011 Alberta Liberal Party leadership election
- Progressive Conservative Association of Alberta leadership elections

== Works cited ==
=== Bibliography ===
- Stewart, David K.; Sayers, Anthony M. (June 2012). An Analysis of the 2011 Alberta Progressive Conservative Leadership Election (PDF). Annual Meeting of the Canadian Political Science Association. Edmonton.
