= Sohail Quadri =

Canadian politician

MLA for Edmonton-Mill Woods
- In office 2012–2015
- Preceded by: Carl Benito
- Succeeded by: Christina Gray

Personal details
- Born: 1971 or 1972 (age 54–55)
- Party: Progressive Conservative

Sohail Quadri is a Pakistani-Canadian politician who served as the MLA for Edmonton-Mill Woods from 2012 until his defeat in the 2015 election.

== Electoral history ==
=== 2015 general election ===
2015 Alberta general election: Edmonton-Mill Woods
Party	Candidate	Votes	%	±%
New Democratic	Christina Gray	9,930	64.86%	50.72%
Progressive Conservative	Sohail Quadri	2,920	19.07%	-16.14%
Wildrose	Baljit Sall	1,437	9.39%	-11.21%
Liberal	Roberto Maglalang	850	5.55%	-15.74%
Independent	Aura Leddy	129	0.84%	–
Communist	Naomi J. Rankin	44	0.29%	–
Total		15,310	–	–
Rejected, spoiled and declined		55	30	22
Eligible electors / turnout		28,130	54.70%	0.10%
New Democratic gain from Progressive Conservative		Swing		17.09%
Source(s) Source: "41 - Edmonton-Mill Woods, 2015 Alberta general election". officialresults.elections.ab.ca. Elections Alberta. Chief Electoral Officer (2016). 2015 General Election. A Report of the Chief Electoral Officer (PDF) (Report). Edmonton, Alta.: Elections Alberta.

=== 2012 general election ===
2012 Alberta general election: Edmonton-Mill Woods
Party	Candidate	Votes	%	±%
Progressive Conservative	Sohail Quadri	4,942	35.21%	-8.66%
Wildrose Alliance	Joanne Autio	3,312	23.60%	20.64%
Liberal	Weslyn Mather	2,988	21.29%	-15.60%
New Democratic	Sandra Azocar	1,985	14.14%	0.54%
Independent	Carl Benito	545	3.88%	–
Alberta Party	Robert Leddy	262	1.87%	–
Total		14,034	–	–
Rejected, spoiled and declined		111	68	7
Eligible electors / turnout		25,920	54.60%	15.49%
Progressive Conservative hold		Swing		2.32%
Source(s) Source: "41 - Edmonton-Mill Woods, 2012 Alberta general election". officialresults.elections.ab.ca. Elections Alberta. Chief Electoral Officer (2012). The Report of the Chief Electoral Officer on the 2011 Provincial Enumeration and Monday, April 23, 2012 Provincial General Election of the Twenty-eighth Legislative Assembly (PDF) (Report). Edmonton, Alta.: Elections Alberta. Archived (PDF) from the original on May 6, 2021.
