= Wes Taylor =

Wes Taylor may refer to:

- Wes Taylor (politician)
- Wesley Taylor, actor and writer
- A fictional character in the film 2 Days in the Valley
