= Christina Gray =

Canadian politician

The Honourable Christina Gray ECA MLA
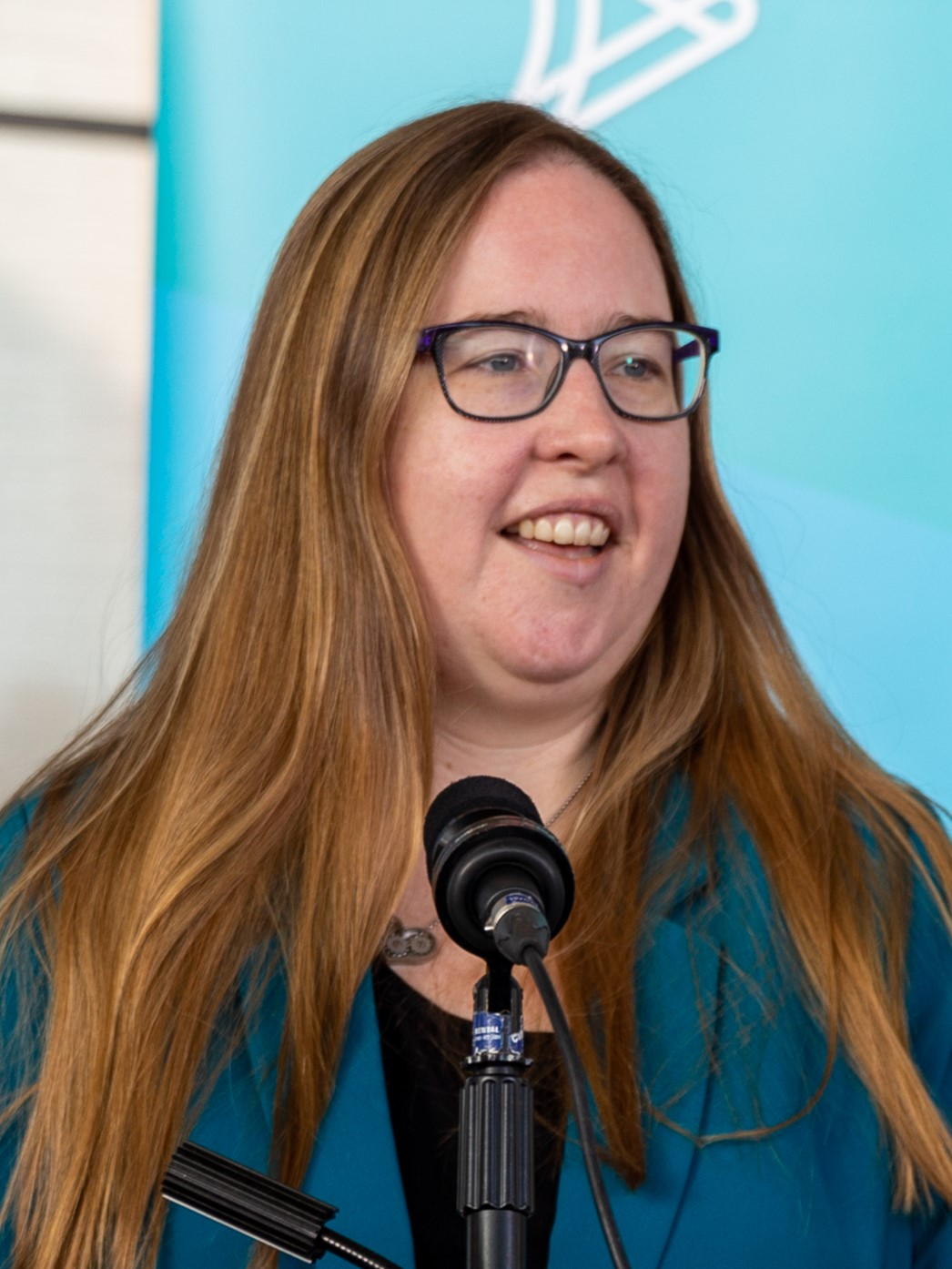
- Gray in March 2019

House Leader of the Alberta New Democratic Party
- Incumbent
- Assumed office February 8, 2021
- Leader: Rachel Notley; Naheed Nenshi
- Preceded by: Heather Sweet

Member of the Legislative Assembly for Edmonton-Mill Woods
- Incumbent
- Assumed office May 5, 2015
- Preceded by: Sohail Quadri

Leader of the Opposition in Alberta
- In office June 23, 2024 – July 11, 2025
- Preceded by: Rachel Notley
- Succeeded by: Naheed Nenshi

Deputy leader of the Alberta New Democratic Party
- In office February 12, 2024 – June 24, 2024
- Leader: Rachel Notley
- Preceded by: Sarah Hoffman
- Succeeded by: Rakhi Pancholi

Alberta Minister of Labour
- In office February 2, 2016 – April 29, 2019
- Premier: Rachel Notley
- Preceded by: Lori Sigurdson
- Succeeded by: Jason Copping

Alberta Minister Responsible for Democratic Renewal
- In office February 2, 2016 – April 29, 2019
- Premier: Rachel Notley
- Preceded by: Position established
- Succeeded by: Position abolished

Personal details
- Born: November 1, 1978 (age 47) Edmonton, Alberta
- Party: New Democratic
- Occupation: Software Development Project Manager

Christina Gray ECA MLA (born November 1, 1978) is a Canadian politician. She is a Member of the Legislative Assembly of Alberta. First elected in 2015 as the member representing Edmonton-Mill Woods, she was re-elected in 2019 and 2023.

She has been the Official Opposition's Critic for the Ministry of Labour and Immigration. Gray also serves on the Legislative Assembly's Standing Committee on Legislative Offices and on the Standing Committee on Alberta's Economic Future.

In the 29th Alberta Legislature Gray served as Chair of the Select Special Ethics and Accountability Committee and Deputy Chair of the Standing Committee on Public Accounts.

== Political career ==
=== Minister of Labour and Minister Responsible for Democratic Renewal ===
On February 2, 2016, Gray was appointed to be Minister of Labour and Minister Responsible for Democratic Renewal in Premier Rachel Notley's Cabinet.

=== Official Opposition ===
When the NDP was relegated to the opposition benches in 2019, Gray became the Official Opposition Critic for Labour and as the Alberta NDP House Leader. She also was a member of the Standing Committee on the Alberta Heritage Savings Trust Fund.

==== Deputy Leader ====
On February 12, 2024, Gray was appointed Deputy Leader of the Alberta NDP.

==== Leader of the Official Opposition ====
On June 23, 2024, the new leader of the NDP, Naheed Nenshi, appointed Gray as the Leader of the Official Opposition. She had this position until Nenshi won a seat a year later. Gray also continued as the House Leader of the Official Opposition.

==== Bill 210 ====
In April 2025, Gray introduced a private member's bill that aimed to introduce server-friendly regulations on tips. Bill 210 proposed changes that prohibited employers from treating tips and gratuities as part of an employee wage and prohibited withholding or deducting tips from the employee.

== Electoral history ==
=== 2023 general election ===
2023 Alberta general election: Edmonton-Mill Woods
Party	Candidate	Votes	%	±%
New Democratic	Christina Gray	11,063	61.69	+11.70
United Conservative	Raman Athwal	6,869	38.31	+0.03
Total		17,932	99.02	–
Rejected and declined		177	0.98	
Turnout		18,109	56.48	
Eligible voters		32,062		
New Democratic hold		Swing		+5.83
Source(s) Source: Elections Alberta

=== 2019 general election ===
2019 Alberta general election: Edmonton-Mill Woods
Party	Candidate	Votes	%	±%
New Democratic	Christina Gray	10,461	50.00%	-14.86%
United Conservative	Heather Sworin	8,008	38.27%	9.81%
Alberta Party	Anju Sharma	1,560	7.46%	–
Liberal	Abdi Bakal	572	2.73%	-2.82%
Alberta Independence	Dallas Price	254	1.21%	–
Communist	Andrew J. Janewski	69	0.33%	0.04%
Total		20,924	–	–
Rejected, spoiled and declined		78	75	17
Eligible electors / turnout		32,353	64.97%	10.27%
New Democratic hold		Swing		-17.03%
Source(s) Source: "38 - Edmonton-Mill Woods, 2019 Alberta general election". officialresults.elections.ab.ca. Elections Alberta. Alberta. Chief Electoral Officer (2019). 2019 General Election. A Report of the Chief Electoral Officer. Volume II (PDF) (Report). Vol. 2. Edmonton, Alta.: Elections Alberta. pp. 148–151. ISBN 978-1-988620-12-1.

=== 2015 general election ===
2015 Alberta general election: Edmonton-Mill Woods
Party	Candidate	Votes	%	±%
New Democratic	Christina Gray	9,930	64.86%	50.72%
Progressive Conservative	Sohail Quadri	2,920	19.07%	-16.14%
Wildrose	Baljit Sall	1,437	9.39%	-11.21%
Liberal	Roberto Maglalang	850	5.55%	-15.74%
Independent	Aura Leddy	129	0.84%	–
Communist	Naomi J. Rankin	44	0.29%	–
Total		15,310	–	–
Rejected, spoiled and declined		55	30	22
Eligible electors / turnout		28,130	54.70%	0.10%
New Democratic gain from Progressive Conservative		Swing		17.09%
Source(s) Source: "41 - Edmonton-Mill Woods, 2015 Alberta general election". officialresults.elections.ab.ca. Elections Alberta. Chief Electoral Officer (2016). 2015 General Election. A Report of the Chief Electoral Officer (PDF) (Report). Edmonton, Alta.: Elections Alberta.

=== 2008 general election ===
2008 Alberta general election
Party	Candidate	Votes	%
Progressive Conservative	Carl Benito	4,752	43.87%
Liberal	Weslyn Mather	3,996	36.89%
New Democratic	Christina Gray	1,474	13.61%
Wildrose Alliance	Robert Leddy	320	2.95%
Green	David Hruska	290	2.68%
