= Robert Fischer (Canadian politician) =

Canadian politician (1937–2020)

Robert "Butch" Fischer

Member of the Legislative Assembly of Alberta
- In office 1982 – December 31, 2001
- Preceded by: Charles Stewart
- Succeeded by: Doug Griffiths
- Constituency: Wainwright

Minister of Public Works, Supply, and Services
- In office September 15, 1994 – May 31, 1996
- Preceded by: Tom Thurber
- Succeeded by: Stan Woloshyn

Minister of Transportation and Utilities
- In office May 31, 1996 – March 29, 1997
- Preceded by: Steve West
- Succeeded by: Walter Paszkowski

Personal details
- Born: Robert Arnold Fischer; June 9, 1937 Irma, Alberta, Canada
- Died: August 9, 2020 (aged 83) Wainwright, Alberta, Canada
- Party: Progressive Conservative
- Occupation: politician

Robert Arnold "Butch" Fischer (June 9, 1937 – August 9, 2020) was a Canadian provincial level politician from Alberta. He served as a member of the Legislative Assembly of Alberta from 1982 until 2001 sitting with the governing Progressive Conservative caucus. He was investigated for a conflict of interest in 2001 that led to his resignation. During his time in office he served in a couple of different cabinet portfolios under the Ralph Klein government.

== Early life ==
Robert Arnold Fischer was born June 9, 1937, in Irma, Alberta to George Everett Fischer and Marjorie Lillian Dutton. Fischer would marry Marian Annette Smallwood on February 21, 1959, and have five children together.

== Political career ==
Fischer ran for a seat to the Legislative Assembly of Alberta in the 1982 Alberta general election. He won a comfortable plurality defeating Bill Veitch from the Western Canada Concept and three other candidates to hold the Wainwright provincial electoral district for the governing Progressive Conservative party.

He ran for his second term in office in the 1986 Alberta general election. He won a greater percent of the popular vote but a slightly reduced plurality. He still defeated the other three candidates comfortably. Fischer faced off for the second time against Liberal candidate Joe Vermette and New Democrat Willy Kelch in the 1989 Alberta general election. He would win his third term easily despite his total popular vote slipping for the second straight election.

Fischer would stand for re-election to his fourth term in office in the 1993 general election. He would fend off three other candidates in the race and for the first time in three elections Fischer saw his popular vote increase.

Premier Ralph Klein appointed Fischer to the Executive Council of Alberta for the first time on September 15, 1994. He would become the new Minister of Public Works, Supply, and Services. On May 31, 1996, he was shuffled to the Minister of Transportation and Utilities portfolio. He would have ministerial advantage for running for his fifth term in office in the 1997 Alberta general election. His personal popularity continued to climb and he almost won his district with a landslide.

After the election Fischer would not return to cabinet. He would run for his final term in office in the 2001 Alberta general election. Despite not having a cabinet portfolio he won the election, seeing Jerry Barber from the Alberta First Party finish second. He resigned his seat on December 31, 2001, after being investigated for a breach of ethics regarding a private business deal.

== Death ==
Fischer would die on August 9, 2020.
