= Charles Stewart (Wainwright MLA) =

Canadian politician

Member of the Legislative Assembly of Alberta
- In office 1975–1982
- Preceded by: Henry Ruste
- Succeeded by: Robert Fischer
- Constituency: Wainwright

Personal details
- Born: March 26, 1917
- Died: October 3, 1991 (aged 74)
- Party: Progressive Conservative

Charles Stewart (March 26, 1917 – October 3, 1991) was a Canadian politician who served as a member of the Legislative Assembly of Alberta from 1975 to 1982, sitting with the governing Progressive Conservative caucus.

== Political career ==
Stewart ran for a seat to the Alberta Legislature in the 1975 Alberta general election. He won the electoral district of Wainwright defeating two other candidates by a comfortable majority to pick up the seat for the governing Progressive Conservative party.

He ran for a second term in office in the 1979 Alberta general election. Despite the opposition making gains Stewart slightly improved on his total popular vote. This resulted in him keeping seat by a comfortable majority. He retired from provincial politics at dissolution of the assembly in 1982.
