= George LeRoy Hudson =

Canadian politician

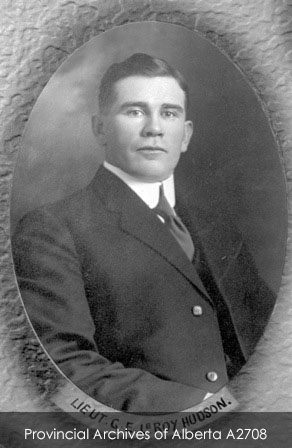

Member of the Legislative Assembly of Alberta
- In office April 17, 1913 – July 18, 1921
- Preceded by: constituency created
- Succeeded by: John Russell Love
- Constituency: Wainwright electoral district

Personal details
- Born: August 4, 1883 Ontario
- Died: January 14, 1952 (aged 68)
- Party: Conservative
- Occupation: politician

Military service
- Allegiance: Canada
- Rank: Captain
- Unit: 49th Battalion
- Battles/wars: World War I

George E. LeRoy Hudson (August 4, 1883 – January 14, 1952) was a politician from Alberta, Canada.

Hudson was first elected to the Alberta Legislature in the 1913 Alberta general election, winning the new Wainwright electoral district for the Conservative party in a hotly contested election over Liberal candidate and first Mayor of the Town of Wainwright Henry Yale Pawling in which he won by less than 100 votes.

Hudson was re-elected to his second term in the Legislature in the 1917 Alberta general election by acclamation under section 38 of the Election Act that stipulated that Members of the Legislative Assembly of Alberta who went to fight overseas in World War I would not face an election in their districts.

In the 1921 Alberta general election Hudson was defeated in a landslide by John Russell Love, a candidate from the United Farmers of Alberta. He attempted to regain his seat and faced Love again in the 1926 Alberta general election re-gaining over 600 votes over his 1921 total but was still defeated by a wide plurality.

Legislative Assembly of Alberta
Preceded by New District	MLA Wainwright; 1913–1921	Succeeded by John Russell Love
