= John Russell Love =

Canadian politician (1895-1981)

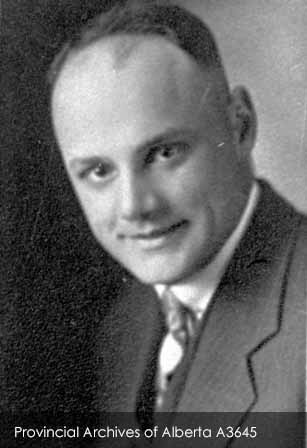

Member of the Legislative Assembly of Alberta
- In office July 18, 1921 – August 22, 1935
- Preceded by: George Hudson
- Succeeded by: William Masson
- Constituency: Wainwright

Provincial Treasurer
- In office July 10, 1934 – September 3, 1935
- Premier: Richard Reid
- Preceded by: Richard Reid
- Succeeded by: Charles Cockroft

Personal details
- Born: January 9, 1895 Toronto, Ontario
- Died: February 9, 1981 (aged 86) Edmonton, Alberta
- Party: United Farmers
- Occupation: Politician

John Russell Love (January 9, 1895 – February 9, 1981) was a politician from Alberta, Canada. He served in the Legislative Assembly of Alberta from 1921 to 1935 as a member of the United Farmers caucus in government. He served as a cabinet minister in the government of Richard Reid from 1934 to 1935.

== Early life ==
Love was born January 9, 1895, in Toronto, Ontario, to Harry Wilbert Love and Ada Breckon. He married Catherine Isabelle McCrimmon on November 11, 1925.

== Political career ==
Love ran for a seat to the Alberta Legislature in the 1921 general election under the United Farmers banner. He won a landslide in the three-way race over incumbent George Hudson to pick up the seat for his party.

Love ran for a second term in office in the 1926 Alberta general election. He faced Hudson again in a two-way battle. Despite losing some popular vote to Hudson, Love still rolled up a comfortable majority.

Love ran for a third term in the 1930 general election. He defeated independent candidate Ernest A. Pitman on the second count.

Premier Richard Reid, who took over in 1934, appointed Love Provincial Treasurer on July 10, 1934. He moved to the electoral district of Sturgeon when he ran for re-election in the 1935 general election. He finished a distant third on the first count and was eliminated in transfers; Social Credit candidate James Popil became the district's new member.
