= William Masson =

Canadian politician (1888-1983)

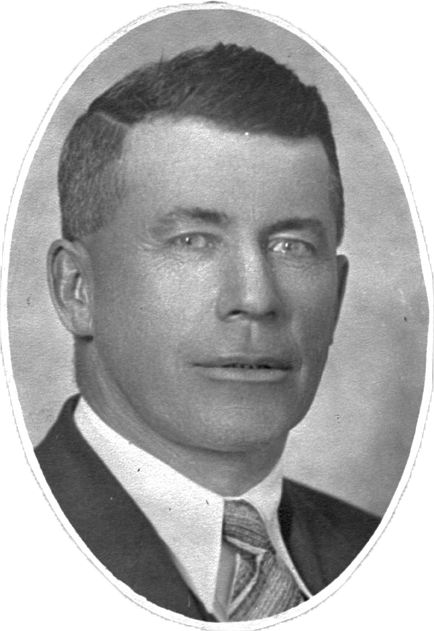

Member of the Legislative Assembly of Alberta
- In office August 22, 1935 – June 29, 1955
- Preceded by: John Love
- Succeeded by: Henry Ruste
- Constituency: Wainwright

Personal details
- Born: 13 June 1888 Auldearn, Nairn, Scotland
- Died: 16 April 1983 (aged 94) Viking, Alberta
- Party: Social Credit
- Occupation: politician

William Masson was a politician from Alberta, Canada. He served in the Legislative Assembly of Alberta from 1935 to 1955 as a member of the Social Credit caucus in government.

== Political career ==
Masson ran for a seat to the Alberta Legislature as a Social Credit candidate in the electoral district of Wainwright for the 1935 general election. He defeated three other candidates in an open race with a large percentage of the vote to pick up the seat for his party.

Masson ran for a second term in office in the 1940 Alberta general election. He faced three other candidates, among them Albert Blue, a former Social Credit MLA whose district, Ribstone had been abolished after redistribution and who now ran under the banner of the Independent Progressive Association. Masson retained the seat in the third vote count.

Masson ran for a third term in office in the 1944 Alberta general election. He was returned on the first ballot with a very large majority over two other candidates.

Masson ran for a fourth term in office in the 1948 Alberta general election. His popular vote dropped slightly compared to 1944, but he won the three-way race to keep his seat.

Masson ran for a fifth term in the 1952 Alberta general election. He lost popular support for the second election in a row, but won with over half the popular vote over two other candidates.

Masson retired from provincial politics at dissolution of the assembly in 1955.
