= Edmonton-Mill Woods (provincial electoral district) =

Provincial electoral district in Alberta, Canada

Coordinates: 53.46°N 113.43°W

Alberta electoral district
- Edmonton-Mill Woods within the City of Edmonton, 2017 boundaries

Provincial electoral district
- Legislature: Legislative Assembly of Alberta
MLA
Christina Gray
New Democratic
- District created: 1979
- First contested: 1979
- Last contested: 2023

Edmonton-Mill Woods is a provincial electoral district in Alberta, Canada. It is one of 87 current electoral districts mandated to return a single member to the Legislative Assembly of Alberta using the first past the post method of voting.

This urban district is located in south central Edmonton was created in the 1979 boundary redistribution from Edmonton-Avonmore. The electoral district since its creation has been a swing riding controlled by the Progressive Conservatives, New Democrats and Liberals. The current representative is New Democrat Christina Gray who was first elected in 2015, and re-elected in 2019.

== History ==
The electoral district was created in the 1979 boundary redistribution from Edmonton-Avonmore. The 2010 boundary redistribution saw some changes made to the riding. The south boundary was pushed southward from 23 Avenue east of Mill Woods Drive to Anthony Henday Drive in land that used to be part of Edmonton-Ellerslie. The east boundary was changed to cede land south of Mill Creek to Edmonton-Mill Creek.

=== Boundary history ===
38 Edmonton-Mill Woods 2003 boundaries
Bordering districts
North	East	West	South
Edmonton-Mill Creek	Edmonton-Mill Creek	Edmonton-Strathcona and Edmonton-Rutherford	Edmonton-Ellerslie
riding map goes here			
Legal description from the Statutes of Alberta 2003, Electoral Divisions Act.
Starting at the intersection of Gateway Boulevard with Whitemud Drive; then 1. east along Whitemud Drive to 50 Street; 2. south along 50 Street to Mill Creek; 3. in a southeasterly direction along Mill Creek to 23 Avenue; 4. west along 23 Avenue to 50 Street; 5. north along 50 Street to 28 Avenue; 6. west along 28 Avenue to 91 Street; 7. north along 91 Street to 34 Avenue; 8. west along 34 Avenue to Gateway Boulevard; 9. north along Gateway Boulevard to the starting point.
Note:

41 Edmonton-Mill Woods 2010 boundaries
Bordering districts
North	East	West	South
Edmonton-Mill Creek	Edmonton-Mill Creek	Edmonton-Rutherford, Edmonton-South West and Edmonton-Strathcona	Edmonton-Ellerslie
Legal description from the Statutes of Alberta 2010, Electoral Divisions Act.

=== Electoral history ===
Edmonton-Mill Woods
Assembly	Years	Member	Party
Riding created from Edmonton-Avonmore, Edmonton-Ottewell and Wetaskiwin-Leduc
19th	1979–1982	Milt Pahl	Progressive Conservative
20th	1982–1986	Milt Pahl	Progressive Conservative
21st	1986–1989	Gerry Gibeault	New Democratic
22nd	1989–1993	Gerry Gibeault	New Democratic
23rd	1993–1997	Don Massey	Liberal
24th	1997–2001	Don Massey	Liberal
25th	2001–2004	Don Massey	Liberal
26th	2004–2008	Weslyn Mather	Liberal
27th	2008–2012	Carl Benito	Progressive Conservative
28th	2012–2015	Sohail Quadri	Progressive Conservative
29th	2015–2019	Christina Gray	New Democratic
30th	2019–2023	Christina Gray	New Democratic
31st	2023–Present	Christina Gray	New Democratic

The electoral district was created in the 1979 boundary redistribution. The election held that year saw Progressive Conservative candidate Milt Pahl won a large majority to pick up the new seat for his party. He won a second term in the 1982 general election. He more than doubled his popular vote but faced a strong challenge from NDP candidate Gerry Gibeault and ended up decreasing his overall percentage.

Premier Peter Lougheed would appoint Pahl to the provincial cabinet as a Minister without Portfolio. He held that going into the 1986 general election while attempting to run for his third term in office. The election that year saw a rematch between Gibeault and Pahl.

The race in 1986 was very close with Gibeault winning by less than 100 votes to pick up the seat for the New Democrats. He won a higher popular vote running for a second term in the 1989 general election but his overall percent was reduced. He moved to the Edmonton-Ellerslie electoral district to run for election in 1993 and was defeated.

Liberal candidate Don Massey won the district in the 1993 election to pick it up for his party. He was re-elected with a smaller majority in the 1997 election and just barely held onto the district in the 2001 general election as he face a strong challenge from future Progressive Conservative MLA Carl Benito.

Massey briefly became leader of the provincial Liberals in 2004. He decided not to run again for office and retired at dissolution of the assembly later that year. His replacement in the legislature was Liberal candidate Weslyn Mather who won the district with just under half the popular vote in the 2004 election.

Mather was defeated by Carl Benito in the 2008 election who managed to win the seat for the Progressive Conservatives for the first time in 22 years.

== Legislative election results ==
=== 2023 ===
2023 Alberta general election
Party	Candidate	Votes	%	±%
New Democratic	Christina Gray	11,063	61.69	+11.70
United Conservative	Raman Athwal	6,869	38.31	+0.03
Total		17,932	99.02	–
Rejected and declined		177	0.98	
Turnout		18,109	56.48	
Eligible voters		32,062		
New Democratic hold		Swing		+5.83
Source(s) Source: Elections Alberta

=== 2019 ===
2019 Alberta general election: Edmonton-Mill Woods
Party	Candidate	Votes	%	±%
New Democratic	Christina Gray	10,461	50.00%	-14.86%
United Conservative	Heather Sworin	8,008	38.27%	9.81%
Alberta Party	Anju Sharma	1,560	7.46%	–
Liberal	Abdi Bakal	572	2.73%	-2.82%
Alberta Independence	Dallas Price	254	1.21%	–
Communist	Andrew J. Janewski	69	0.33%	0.04%
Total		20,924	–	–
Rejected, spoiled and declined		78	75	17
Eligible electors / turnout		32,353	64.97%	10.27%
New Democratic hold		Swing		-17.03%
Source(s) Source: "38 - Edmonton-Mill Woods, 2019 Alberta general election". officialresults.elections.ab.ca. Elections Alberta. Alberta. Chief Electoral Officer (2019). 2019 General Election. A Report of the Chief Electoral Officer. Volume II (PDF) (Report). Vol. 2. Edmonton, Alta.: Elections Alberta. pp. 148–151. ISBN 978-1-988620-12-1.

=== 2015 ===
2015 Alberta general election: Edmonton-Mill Woods
Party	Candidate	Votes	%	±%
New Democratic	Christina Gray	9,930	64.86%	50.72%
Progressive Conservative	Sohail Quadri	2,920	19.07%	-16.14%
Wildrose	Baljit Sall	1,437	9.39%	-11.21%
Liberal	Roberto Maglalang	850	5.55%	-15.74%
Independent	Aura Leddy	129	0.84%	–
Communist	Naomi J. Rankin	44	0.29%	–
Total		15,310	–	–
Rejected, spoiled and declined		55	30	22
Eligible electors / turnout		28,130	54.70%	0.10%
New Democratic gain from Progressive Conservative		Swing		17.09%
Source(s) Source: "41 - Edmonton-Mill Woods, 2015 Alberta general election". officialresults.elections.ab.ca. Elections Alberta. Chief Electoral Officer (2016). 2015 General Election. A Report of the Chief Electoral Officer (PDF) (Report). Edmonton, Alta.: Elections Alberta.

=== 2012 ===
2012 Alberta general election: Edmonton-Mill Woods
Party	Candidate	Votes	%	±%
Progressive Conservative	Sohail Quadri	4,942	35.21%	-8.66%
Wildrose Alliance	Joanne Autio	3,312	23.60%	20.64%
Liberal	Weslyn Mather	2,988	21.29%	-15.60%
New Democratic	Sandra Azocar	1,985	14.14%	0.54%
Independent	Carl Benito	545	3.88%	–
Alberta Party	Robert Leddy	262	1.87%	–
Total		14,034	–	–
Rejected, spoiled and declined		111	68	7
Eligible electors / turnout		25,920	54.60%	15.49%
Progressive Conservative hold		Swing		2.32%
Source(s) Source: "41 - Edmonton-Mill Woods, 2012 Alberta general election". officialresults.elections.ab.ca. Elections Alberta. Chief Electoral Officer (2012). The Report of the Chief Electoral Officer on the 2011 Provincial Enumeration and Monday, April 23, 2012 Provincial General Election of the Twenty-eighth Legislative Assembly (PDF) (Report). Edmonton, Alta.: Elections Alberta. Archived (PDF) from the original on May 6, 2021.

=== 2008 ===
2008 Alberta general election: Edmonton-Mill Woods
Party	Candidate	Votes	%	±%
Progressive Conservative	Carl Benito	4,752	43.87%	15.21%
Liberal	Weslyn Mather	3,996	36.89%	-11.12%
New Democratic	Christina Gray	1,474	13.61%	-1.38%
Wildrose Alliance	Robert Leddy	321	2.96%	-4.98%
Green	David A. Hrushka	289	2.67%	–
Total		10,832	–	–
Rejected, spoiled and declined		20	12	4
Eligible electors / Turnout		27,755	39.11%	-5.85%
Progressive Conservative gain from Liberal		Swing		-6.18%
Source(s) Source: "38 - Edmonton-Mill Woods, 2008 Alberta general election". officialresults.elections.ab.ca. Elections Alberta. Chief Electoral Officer (2008). The Report on the March 3, 2008 Provincial General Election of the Twenty-Seventh Legislative Assembly (Report). Edmonton, Alta.: Elections Alberta.

=== 2004 ===
2004 Alberta general election: Edmonton-Mill Woods
Party	Candidate	Votes	%	±%
Liberal	Weslyn Mather	5,012	48.01%	-0.96%
Progressive Conservative	Naresh Bhardwaj	2,992	28.66%	-15.16%
New Democratic	Lloyd Nelson	1,565	14.99%	7.77%
Alberta Alliance	Charles Relland	829	7.94%	–
Communist	Naomi J. Rankin	42	0.40%	–
Total		10,440	–	–
Rejected, spoiled and declined		43	18	1
Eligible electors / Turnout		23,319	44.96%	-9.37%
Liberal hold		Swing		7.10%
Source(s) Source: "00 - Edmonton-Mill Woods, 2004 Alberta general election". officialresults.elections.ab.ca. Elections Alberta. Alberta. Chief Electoral Officer (2005). Report of the Chief Electoral Officer on the General Enumeration and General Election of the Twenty-sixth Legislative Assembly (Report). Edmonton: Alberta Legislative Assembly, Office of the Chief Electoral Officer.

=== 2001 ===
2001 Alberta general election: Edmonton-Mill Woods
Party	Candidate	Votes	%	±%
Liberal	Don Massey	4,920	48.97%	-2.31%
Progressive Conservative	Carl Benito	4,402	43.81%	13.79%
New Democratic	Mel H. Buffalo	725	7.22%	-5.48%
Total		10,047	–	–
Rejected, spoiled and declined		25	13	3
Eligible electors / Turnout		18,546	54.32%	-1.45%
Liberal hold		Swing		-8.05%
Source(s) Source: "Edmonton-Mill Woods Official Results 2001 Alberta general election". Alberta Heritage Community Foundation. Alberta. Chief Electoral Officer (2001). The report of the Chief Electoral Officer on the 2000 provincial confirmation process and Monday, March 12, 2001, Provincial General Election of the twenty-fifth Legislative Assembly. Edmonton: Alberta Legislative Assembly, Office of the Chief Electoral Officer.

=== 1997 ===
1997 Alberta general election: Edmonton-Mill Woods
Party	Candidate	Votes	%	±%
Liberal	Don Massey	5,113	51.28%	-4.83%
Progressive Conservative	Ziad N. Jaber	2,993	30.02%	3.11%
New Democratic	Ricardo Acuna	1,266	12.70%	2.10%
Social Credit	John Filp	546	5.48%	1.12%
Greens	Raymond Boyko	52	0.52%	0.04%
Total		9,970	–	–
Rejected, spoiled and declined		15	23	3
Eligible electors / Turnout		17,909	55.77%	-0.70%
Liberal hold		Swing		-3.97%
Source(s) Source: "Edmonton-Mill Woods Official Results 1997 Alberta general election". Alberta Heritage Community Foundation. Alberta. Chief Electoral Officer (1997). Report of the Chief Electoral Officer, November, 1996 general enumeration and Tuesday, March 11, 1997 general election Twenty-fourth Legislative Assembly. Edmonton: Alberta Legislative Assembly, Office of the Chief Electoral Officer.

=== 1993 ===
1993 Alberta general election: Edmonton-Mill Woods
Party	Candidate	Votes	%	±%
Liberal	Don Massey	5,330	56.11%	22.40%
Progressive Conservative	W. Bill Pidruchney	2,556	26.91%	2.14%
New Democratic	Laat Bhinder	1,007	10.60%	-30.92%
Social Credit	Robert J. Alford	414	4.36%	–
Independent	Ken Kozak	102	1.07%	–
Greens	Raymond Boyko	46	0.48%	–
Natural Law	Mary D. Romach	44	0.46%	–
Total		9,499	–	–
Rejected, spoiled and declined		22	–	–
Eligible electors / Turnout		16,861	56.47%	2.51%
Liberal gain from New Democratic		Swing		10.70%
Source(s) Source: "Edmonton-Mill Woods Official Results 1993 Alberta general election". Alberta Heritage Community Foundation.

=== 1989 ===
1989 Alberta general election: Edmonton-Mill Woods
Party	Candidate	Votes	%	±%
New Democratic	Gerry Gibeault	5,824	41.52%	-1.47%
Liberal	Murray W. Scambler	4,729	33.71%	24.69%
Progressive Conservative	Bas Roopnarine	3,475	24.77%	-17.18%
Total		14,028	–	–
Rejected, spoiled and declined		26	–	–
Eligible electors / Turnout		26,048	53.95%	12.05%
New Democratic hold		Swing		3.38%
Source(s) Source: "Edmonton-Mill Woods Official Results 1989 Alberta general election". Alberta Heritage Community Foundation.

=== 1986 ===
1986 Alberta general election: Edmonton-Mill Woods
Party	Candidate	Votes	%	±%
New Democratic	Gerry Gibeault	4,103	42.99%	14.43%
Progressive Conservative	Milt Pahl	4,004	41.95%	-13.93%
Liberal	Philip Lister	861	9.02%	5.75%
Representative	Richard Mather	445	4.66%	–
Christian Heritage	Mike Pawlus	132	1.38%	–
Total		9,545	–	–
Rejected, spoiled and declined		18	–	–
Eligible electors / Turnout		22,823	41.90%	-19.24%
New Democratic gain from Progressive Conservative		Swing		-13.14%
Source(s) Source: "Edmonton-Mill Woods Official Results 1986 Alberta general election". Alberta Heritage Community Foundation.

=== 1982 ===
1982 Alberta general election: Edmonton-Mill Woods
Party	Candidate	Votes	%	±%
Progressive Conservative	Milt Pahl	10,095	55.88%	-2.12%
New Democratic	Gerry Gibeault	5159	28.55%	7.62%
Western Canada Concept	Dave Fletcher	1894	10.48%	–
Liberal	Winston Mohabir	590	3.27%	-10.08%
Social Credit	Terry Juba	329	1.82%	-5.91%
Total		18,067	–	–
Rejected, spoiled and declined		39	–	–
Eligible electors / Turnout		29,614	61.14%	5.81%
Progressive Conservative hold		Swing		-4.87%
Source(s) Source: "Edmonton-Mill Woods Official Results 1982 Alberta general election". Alberta Heritage Community Foundation.

=== 1979 ===
1979 Alberta general election: Edmonton-Mill Woods
Party	Candidate	Votes	%	±%
Progressive Conservative	Milt Pahl	4,299	57.99%	–
New Democratic	L. (Les) Owre	1,552	20.94%	–
Liberal	Rose MacPherson	989	13.34%	–
Social Credit	Rudy Rodriques	573	7.73%	–
Total		7,413	–	–
Rejected, spoiled and declined		242	–	–
Eligible electors / Turnout		13,834	55.33%	–
Progressive Conservative pickup new district.				
Source(s) Source: "Edmonton-Mill Woods Official Results 1979 Alberta general election". Alberta Heritage Community Foundation.

== Senate nominee election results ==
=== 2004 ===
2004 Senate nominee election results: Edmonton-Mill Woods				Turnout 45.00%	
Affiliation	Candidate	Votes	% votes	% ballots	Rank
Progressive Conservative	Betty Unger	3,764	13.91%	44.22%	2
Independent	Link Byfield	3,273	12.09%	38.45%	4
Progressive Conservative	Bert Brown	3,061	11.31%	35.96%	1
Progressive Conservative	Cliff Breitkreuz	2,937	10.85%	34.50%	3
Alberta Alliance	Michael Roth	2,791	10.31%	32.79%	7
Independent	Tom Sindlinger	2,490	9.20%	29.25%	9
Alberta Alliance	Gary Horan	2,447	9.04%	28.75%	10
Alberta Alliance	Vance Gough	2,400	8.87%	28.20%	8
Progressive Conservative	David Usherwood	2,119	7.83%	24.89%	6
Progressive Conservative	Jim Silye	1,780	6.59%	20.91%	5
Total votes		27,062	100%		
Total ballots		8,512	3.18 votes per ballot		
Rejected, spoiled and declined		1,982			

Voters had the option of selecting four candidates on the ballot

== See also ==
- List of Alberta provincial electoral districts
- Canadian provincial electoral districts
