= Hung Pham =

Canadian politician

Member of the Legislative Assembly of Alberta for Calgary-Montrose
- In office June 15, 1993 – March 3, 2008
- Preceded by: Rick Orman
- Succeeded by: Manmeet Bhullar

Personal details
- Born: October 2, 1963 (age 63) Saigon, South Vietnam
- Party: Progressive Conservative
- Education: University of Calgary, Mount Royal College

Hung Pham or Hung Kim Pham (born Phạm Kim Hưng; October 2, 1963 in Saigon) is a former politician and information expert in Alberta, Canada. He formerly served as a member of the Legislative Assembly of Alberta, Canada.

== Early life ==
Born and growing up in Saigon, the capital of South Vietnam, Hung Pham was one of the boat people leaving the country after the Vietnam War. Coming to Canada in 1980 at the age of 16 without knowing how to speak English, teenager Hung Pham worked as a part-time janitor to make his living while going to high-school in Calgary.

== Education ==
Hung Pham completed his high-school education in 1982 and subsequently took the computer science university transfer program at Mount Royal College, where he received many awards and scholarships for outstanding academic achievements. Pham then transferred to the University of Calgary in 1984 and graduated from the university in 1986 with two bachelor's degrees with Distinction: Bachelor of Science with Distinction in Computer Science and Bachelor of Science with Distinction in Pure Mathematics. He went on to take a Master's program at the University of Calgary, specializing in Artificial Intelligence.

== Career ==
Pham started as a prominent Information Analyst with Canalta Data Services in 1988, he then joined The City of Calgary in 1989 as a Database Technical Analyst. He was promoted by The City of Calgary to be Senior Programmer Analyst in 1991.

== Community activities ==
As an active member of many non-profit organizations, Hung Pham helped Calgary Police Service with its multicultural and crime prevention programs. He was elected President of Calgary Vietnamese Canadian Association in 1990. In this position, he promoted programs to help low income workers. With his well-known speech delivered to the community on 1991 Tết celebration event, Pham publicly declared his programs to help cleaners in Calgary.

== Political career ==
Pham was elected five times, holding many positions in the Alberta Government. In 2006, he was promoted by Premier Ed Stelmach to be a member of Alberta Treasury Board, the legislative body responsible for all expenditures and budgets of Alberta (Premier Ed Stelmach is also a member of the board).

Pham did not run for election in 2008 election.

Legislative Assembly of Alberta
Preceded by Rick Orman	MLA Calgary Montrose; 1993–2008	Succeeded by Manmeet Bhullar
