= Wainwright (provincial electoral district) =

Defunct provincial electoral district in Alberta, Canada

Coordinates: 52.8°N 110.8°W

Alberta electoral district

Defunct provincial electoral district
- Legislature: Legislative Assembly of Alberta
- District created: 1913
- District abolished: 2004
- First contested: 1913
- Last contested: 2002

Wainwright was a provincial electoral district in Alberta, Canada, mandated to return a single member to the Legislative Assembly of Alberta from 1913 to 2004.

== History ==
=== Members of the Legislative Assembly (MLAs) ===
Members of the Legislative Assembly for Wainwright
| Assembly | Years | Member | Party |
|---|---|---|---|
See Alexandra electoral district from 1909-1913 and Vermilion electoral district from 1905-1913
| 3rd | 1913–1917 | George LeRoy Hudson | Conservative |
| 4th | 1917–1921 | George LeRoy Hudson | Conservative |
| 5th | 1921–1926 | John Russell Love | United Farmers |
| 6th | 1926–1930 | John Russell Love | United Farmers |
| 7th | 1930–1935 | John Russell Love | United Farmers |
| 8th | 1935–1940 | William Masson | Social Credit |
| 9th | 1940–1944 | William Masson | Social Credit |
| 10th | 1944–1948 | William Masson | Social Credit |
| 11th | 1948–1952 | William Masson | Social Credit |
| 12th | 1952–1955 | William Masson | Social Credit |
| 13th | 1955–1959 | Henry A. Ruste | Social Credit |
| 14th | 1959–1963 | Henry A. Ruste | Social Credit |
| 15th | 1963–1967 | Henry A. Ruste | Social Credit |
| 16th | 1967–1971 | Henry A. Ruste | Social Credit |
| 17th | 1971–1975 | Henry A. Ruste | Social Credit |
| 18th | 1975–1979 | Charles Stewart | Progressive Conservative |
| 19th | 1979–1982 | Charles Stewart | Progressive Conservative |
| 20th | 1982–1986 | Butch Fischer | Progressive Conservative |
| 21st | 1986–1989 | Butch Fischer | Progressive Conservative |
| 22nd | 1989–1993 | Butch Fischer | Progressive Conservative |
| 23rd | 1993–1997 | Butch Fischer | Progressive Conservative |
| 24th | 1997–2001 | Butch Fischer | Progressive Conservative |
| 25th | 2001–2002 | Butch Fischer | Progressive Conservative |
| 25th | 2002–2004 | Doug Griffiths | Progressive Conservative |
See Battle River-Wainwright electoral district from 2004-2019

== Election results ==
=== 1913 ===
1913 Alberta general election
| Party | Candidate | Votes | % | ±% |
|---|---|---|---|---|
| Conservative | George LeRoy Hudson | 711 | 53.62% | – |
| Liberal | Henry Yale Pawling | 615 | 46.38% | – |
| Total | | 1,326 | – | – |
| Rejected, spoiled and declined | | N/A | – | – |
| Eligible electors / turnout | | 2,082 | 63.69% | – |
| Conservative pickup new district. | | | | |
Source(s) Source: "Wainwright Official Results 1913 Alberta general election". Alberta Heritage Community Foundation.

=== 1917 ===
1917 Alberta general election
| Party | Candidate | Votes | % | ±% |
|---|---|---|---|---|
| Conservative | George LeRoy Hudson | Acclaimed | – | – |
| Total | | N/A | – | – |
| Rejected, spoiled and declined | | N/A | – | – |
| Eligible electors / turnout | | N/A | N/A | – |
| Conservative hold | | Swing | | N/A |
Source(s) Source: "Wainwright Official Results 1917 Alberta general election". Alberta Heritage Community Foundation.

=== 1921 ===
1921 Alberta general election
| Party | Candidate | Votes | % | ±% |
|---|---|---|---|---|
| United Farmers | John Russell Love | 1,877 | 57.77% | – |
| Liberal | Harcus Strachan | 913 | 28.10% | – |
| Conservative | George LeRoy Hudson | 459 | 14.13% | – |
| Total | | 3,249 | – | – |
| Rejected, spoiled and declined | | N/A | – | – |
| Eligible electors / turnout | | 3,273 | 99.27% | – |
| United Farmers gain from Conservative | | Swing | | N/A |
Source(s) Source: "Wainwright Official Results 1921 Alberta general election". Alberta Heritage Community Foundation.

=== 1926 ===
1926 Alberta general election
| Party | Candidate | Votes | % | ±% |
|---|---|---|---|---|
| United Farmers | John Russell Love | 1,609 | 61.27% | 3.50% |
| Conservative | George LeRoy Hudson | 1,017 | 38.73% | 24.60% |
| Total | | 2,626 | – | – |
| Rejected, spoiled and declined | | 139 | – | – |
| Eligible electors / turnout | | 3,896 | 70.97% | -28.30% |
| United Farmers hold | | Swing | | -3.56% |
Source(s) Source: "Wainwright Official Results 1926 Alberta general election". Alberta Heritage Community Foundation.

=== 1930 ===
1930 Alberta general election
| Party | Candidate | Votes 1st count | % | Votes final count | ±% |
|---|---|---|---|---|---|
| United Farmers | John Russell Love | 1,446 | 46.63% | 1,564 | -14.64% |
| Independent | Ernest A. Pitman | 1,005 | 32.41% | 1,254 | – |
| Liberal | Stephen R. Bowerman | 650 | 20.96% | – | – |
| Total | | 3,101 | – | – | – |
| Rejected, spoiled and declined | | 144 | – | – | – |
| Eligible electors / turnout | | 4,333 | 74.89% | 3.92% | – |
| United Farmers hold | | Swing | | -4.16% | |
Source(s) Source: "Wainwright Official Results 1930 Alberta general election". Alberta Heritage Community Foundation. Instant-runoff voting requires a candidate to receive a plurality (greater than 50%) of the votes. As no candidate received a plurality of votes, the bottom candidate was eliminated and their 2nd place votes were applied to both other candidates until one received a plurality.

=== 1935 ===
1935 Alberta general election
| Party | Candidate | Votes | % | ±% |
|---|---|---|---|---|
| Social Credit | William Masson | 2,382 | 54.88% | – |
| Liberal | Peter Milne | 953 | 21.96% | 1.00% |
| United Farmers | H. L. Coursier | 811 | 18.69% | -27.94% |
| Conservative | Robert Smallwood | 194 | 4.47% | – |
| Total | | 4,340 | – | – |
| Rejected, spoiled and declined | | N/A | – | – |
| Eligible electors / turnout | | 5,191 | 83.61% | 8.72% |
| Social Credit gain from United Farmers | | Swing | | 9.35% |
Source(s) Source: "Wainwright Official Results 1935 Alberta general election". Alberta Heritage Community Foundation.

=== 1940 ===
1940 Alberta general election
| Party | Candidate | Votes 1st count | % | Votes final count | ±% |
|---|---|---|---|---|---|
| Social Credit | William Masson | 2,296 | 43.23% | 2,583 | -11.65% |
| Independent | N. P. Strachan | 1,611 | 30.33% | 2,169 | – |
| Co-operative Commonwealth | Kenneth S. Tory | 1,039 | 19.56% | – | – |
| Independent Progressive | Albert Lester Blue | 365 | 6.87% | – | – |
| Total | | 5,311 | – | – | – |
| Rejected, spoiled and declined | | 189 | – | – | – |
| Eligible electors / turnout | | 7,201 | 76.38% | -7.23% | – |
| Social Credit hold | | Swing | | -10.01% | |
Source(s) Source: "Wainwright Official Results 1940 Alberta general election". Alberta Heritage Community Foundation. Instant-runoff voting requires a candidate to receive a plurality (greater than 50%) of the votes. As no candidate received a plurality of votes, the bottom candidate was eliminated and their 2nd place votes were applied to both other candidates until one received a plurality.

=== 1944 ===
1944 Alberta general election
| Party | Candidate | Votes | % | ±% |
|---|---|---|---|---|
| Social Credit | William Masson | 2,939 | 65.71% | 22.47% |
| Co-operative Commonwealth | M. D. Meade | 1,300 | 29.06% | 9.50% |
| Labor-Progressive | R. Garneau | 234 | 5.23% | – |
| Total | | 4,473 | – | – |
| Rejected, spoiled and declined | | 92 | – | – |
| Eligible electors / turnout | | 6,448 | 70.80% | -5.58% |
| Social Credit hold | | Swing | | 11.87% |
Source(s) Source: "Wainwright Official Results 1944 Alberta general election". Alberta Heritage Community Foundation.

=== 1948 ===
1948 Alberta general election
| Party | Candidate | Votes | % | ±% |
|---|---|---|---|---|
| Social Credit | William Masson | 2,877 | 62.58% | -3.12% |
| Co-operative Commonwealth | Stewart Wright | 887 | 19.30% | -9.77% |
| Liberal | John Alexander Kelly | 833 | 18.12% | – |
| Total | | 4,597 | – | – |
| Rejected, spoiled and declined | | 314 | – | – |
| Eligible electors / turnout | | 6,979 | 70.37% | -0.43% |
| Social Credit hold | | Swing | | 3.32% |
Source(s) Source: "Wainwright Official Results 1948 Alberta general election". Alberta Heritage Community Foundation.

=== 1952 ===
1952 Alberta general election
| Party | Candidate | Votes | % | ±% |
|---|---|---|---|---|
| Social Credit | William Masson | 2,578 | 58.75% | -3.83% |
| Liberal | John Davidson | 1,105 | 25.18% | 7.06% |
| Independent | Kenneth S. Tory | 705 | 16.07% | – |
| Total | | 4,388 | – | – |
| Rejected, spoiled and declined | | 301 | – | – |
| Eligible electors / turnout | | 5,443 | 86.15% | 15.78% |
| Social Credit hold | | Swing | | -4.86% |
Source(s) Source: "Wainwright Official Results 1952 Alberta general election". Alberta Heritage Community Foundation.

=== 1955 ===
1955 Alberta general election
| Party | Candidate | Votes | % | ±% |
|---|---|---|---|---|
| Social Credit | Henry A. Ruste | 2,637 | 54.86% | -3.89% |
| Liberal | John M. Saville | 1,537 | 31.97% | 6.79% |
| Co-operative Commonwealth | James Jackson | 570 | 11.86% | – |
| Labor-Progressive | E. P. Taylor | 63 | 1.31% | – |
| Total | | 4,807 | – | – |
| Rejected, spoiled and declined | | 548 | – | – |
| Eligible electors / turnout | | 7,434 | 72.03% | -14.11% |
| Social Credit hold | | Swing | | -5.34% |
Source(s) Source: "Wainwright Official Results 1955 Alberta general election". Alberta Heritage Community Foundation.

=== 1959 ===
1959 Alberta general election
| Party | Candidate | Votes | % | ±% |
|---|---|---|---|---|
| Social Credit | Henry A. Ruste | 3,465 | 72.28% | 17.42% |
| Progressive Conservative | Donald Mills | 668 | 13.93% | – |
| Liberal | Henry D. Frizzell | 387 | 8.07% | – |
| Co-operative Commonwealth | John Wesley Connelly | 274 | 5.72% | -6.14% |
| Total | | 4,794 | – | – |
| Rejected, spoiled and declined | | 10 | – | – |
| Eligible electors / turnout | | 7,283 | 65.96% | -6.07% |
| Social Credit hold | | Swing | | 17.73% |
Source(s) Source: "Wainwright Official Results 1959 Alberta general election". Alberta Heritage Community Foundation.

=== 1963 ===
1963 Alberta general election
| Party | Candidate | Votes | % | ±% |
|---|---|---|---|---|
| Social Credit | Henry A. Ruste | 3,465 | 76.66% | 4.38% |
| Liberal | John M. Saville | 668 | 14.78% | -6.71% |
| New Democratic | John Wesley Connelly | 387 | 8.56% | 2.82% |
| Total | | 4,520 | – | – |
| Rejected, spoiled and declined | | 24 | – | – |
| Eligible electors / turnout | | 7,284 | 62.38% | -3.58% |
| Social Credit hold | | Swing | | 1.77% |
Source(s) Source: "Wainwright Official Results 1963 Alberta general election". Alberta Heritage Community Foundation.

=== 1967 ===
1967 Alberta general election
| Party | Candidate | Votes | % | ±% |
|---|---|---|---|---|
| Social Credit | Henry A. Ruste | 3,807 | 82.83% | 6.17% |
| New Democratic | Glenn Valleau | 789 | 17.17% | 8.61% |
| Total | | 4,596 | – | – |
| Rejected, spoiled and declined | | 38 | – | – |
| Eligible electors / turnout | | 7,307 | 63.42% | 1.04% |
| Social Credit hold | | Swing | | 1.89% |
Source(s) Source: "Wainwright Official Results 1967 Alberta general election". Alberta Heritage Community Foundation.

=== 1971 ===
1971 Alberta general election
| Party | Candidate | Votes | % | ±% |
|---|---|---|---|---|
| Social Credit | Henry A. Ruste | 3,311 | 63.38% | -19.45% |
| Progressive Conservative | Clifford Smallwood | 1,366 | 26.15% | – |
| New Democratic | Gary Luciow | 547 | 10.47% | -6.70% |
| Total | | 5,224 | – | – |
| Rejected, spoiled and declined | | 28 | – | – |
| Eligible electors / turnout | | 7,272 | 72.22% | 8.80% |
| Social Credit hold | | Swing | | -14.22% |
Source(s) Source: "Wainwright Official Results 1971 Alberta general election". Alberta Heritage Community Foundation.

=== 1975 ===
1975 Alberta general election
| Party | Candidate | Votes | % | ±% |
|---|---|---|---|---|
| Progressive Conservative | Charles Stewart | 3,039 | 59.00% | 32.85% |
| Social Credit | Bev Penman | 1,616 | 31.37% | -32.01% |
| New Democratic | Harold Tangen | 496 | 9.63% | -0.84% |
| Total | | 5,151 | – | – |
| Rejected, spoiled and declined | | 8 | – | – |
| Eligible electors / turnout | | 7,291 | 70.76% | -1.46% |
| Progressive Conservative gain from Social Credit | | Swing | | -4.80% |
Source(s) Source: "Wainwright Official Results 1975 Alberta general election". Alberta Heritage Community Foundation.

=== 1979 ===
1979 Alberta general election
| Party | Candidate | Votes | % | ±% |
|---|---|---|---|---|
| Progressive Conservative | Charles Stewart | 3,489 | 56.47% | -2.52% |
| Social Credit | Keith Cornish | 2,103 | 34.04% | 2.67% |
| New Democratic | Alan Richards | 509 | 8.24% | -1.39% |
| Liberal | Sultan Tejani | 77 | 1.25% | – |
| Total | | 6,178 | – | – |
| Rejected, spoiled and declined | | N/A | – | – |
| Eligible electors / turnout | | 8,660 | 71.34% | 0.58% |
| Progressive Conservative hold | | Swing | | -2.60% |
Source(s) Source: "Wainwright Official Results 1979 Alberta general election". Alberta Heritage Community Foundation.

=== 1982 ===
1982 Alberta general election
| Party | Candidate | Votes | % | ±% |
|---|---|---|---|---|
| Progressive Conservative | Robert A. (Butch) Fischer | 4,589 | 61.78% | 5.31% |
| Western Canada Concept | Bill Veitch | 2,145 | 28.88% | – |
| New Democratic | Wes Connelly | 476 | 6.41% | -1.83% |
| Liberal | Joseph A. Vermette | 218 | 2.93% | 1.69% |
| Total | | 7,428 | – | – |
| Rejected, spoiled and declined | | 12 | – | – |
| Eligible electors / turnout | | 9,766 | 76.18% | 4.84% |
| Progressive Conservative hold | | Swing | | 5.23% |
Source(s) Source: "Wainwright Official Results 1982 Alberta general election". Alberta Heritage Community Foundation.

=== 1986 ===
1986 Alberta general election
| Party | Candidate | Votes | % | ±% |
|---|---|---|---|---|
| Progressive Conservative | Robert A. (Butch) Fischer | 4,244 | 68.56% | 6.78% |
| New Democratic | Willy Kelch | 1,106 | 17.87% | 11.46% |
| Western Canada Concept | Allen Abrassart | 475 | 7.67% | -21.20% |
| Liberal | Joseph A. Vermette | 365 | 5.90% | 2.96% |
| Total | | 6,190 | – | – |
| Rejected, spoiled and declined | | 11 | – | – |
| Eligible electors / turnout | | 11,100 | 55.86% | -20.32% |
| Progressive Conservative hold | | Swing | | 8.90% |
Source(s) Source: "Wainwright Official Results 1986 Alberta general election". Alberta Heritage Community Foundation.

=== 1989 ===
1989 Alberta general election
| Party | Candidate | Votes | % | ±% |
|---|---|---|---|---|
| Progressive Conservative | Robert A. (Butch) Fischer | 4,009 | 67.75% | -0.81% |
| New Democratic | Willy Kelch | 1,182 | 19.98% | 2.11% |
| Liberal | Joseph A. Vermette | 726 | 12.27% | 6.37% |
| Total | | 5,917 | – | – |
| Rejected, spoiled and declined | | 19 | – | – |
| Eligible electors / turnout | | 10,801 | 54.96% | -0.91% |
| Progressive Conservative hold | | Swing | | -1.46% |
Source(s) Source: "Wainwright Official Results 1989 Alberta general election". Alberta Heritage Community Foundation.

=== 1993 ===
1993 Alberta general election
| Party | Candidate | Votes | % | ±% |
|---|---|---|---|---|
| Progressive Conservative | Robert A. (Butch) Fischer | 5,294 | 54.80% | -12.96% |
| Liberal | Evangéline Forcier | 1,933 | 20.01% | 7.74% |
| Social Credit | Dale Trefz | 1,760 | 18.22% | – |
| New Democratic | Tom A. Samuel | 674 | 6.98% | -13.00% |
| Total | | 9,661 | – | – |
| Rejected, spoiled and declined | | 16 | – | – |
| Eligible electors / turnout | | 15,882 | 60.93% | 5.97% |
| Progressive Conservative hold | | Swing | | -6.49% |
Source(s) Source: "Wainwright Official Results 1993 Alberta general election". Alberta Heritage Community Foundation.

=== 1997 ===
1997 Alberta general election
| Party | Candidate | Votes | % | ±% |
|---|---|---|---|---|
| Progressive Conservative | Robert A. (Butch) Fischer | 6,232 | 52.74% | -2.06% |
| Social Credit | Jerry D. Barber | 3,348 | 28.33% | 10.12% |
| Liberal | Ronald Williams | 1,568 | 13.27% | -6.74% |
| New Democratic | Lilas I. Lysne | 668 | 5.65% | -1.32% |
| Total | | 11,816 | – | – |
| Rejected, spoiled and declined | | 29 | – | – |
| Eligible electors / turnout | | 19,756 | 59.96% | -0.97% |
| Progressive Conservative hold | | Swing | | -5.19% |
Source(s) Source: "Wainwright Official Results 1997 Alberta general election". Alberta Heritage Community Foundation.

=== 2001 ===
2001 Alberta general election
| Party | Candidate | Votes | % | ±% |
|---|---|---|---|---|
| Progressive Conservative | Robert A. (Butch) Fischer | 6,910 | 63.62% | 10.88% |
| Alberta First | Jerry D. Barber | 1,394 | 12.83% | – |
| Liberal | Ronald Williams | 1,269 | 11.68% | -1.59% |
| Independent | Jeff Newland | 868 | 7.99% | – |
| New Democratic | Lilas I. Lysne | 420 | 3.87% | -1.79% |
| Total | | 10,861 | – | – |
| Rejected, spoiled and declined | | 16 | – | – |
| Eligible electors / turnout | | 19,292 | 56.38% | -3.58% |
| Progressive Conservative hold | | Swing | | 13.19% |
Source(s) Source: "Wainwright Official Results 2001 Alberta general election". Alberta Heritage Community Foundation.

=== 2002 by-election ===
Alberta provincial by-election, 2002
| Party | Candidate | Votes | % |
|---|---|---|---|
| Progressive Conservative | Doug Griffiths | 2,924 | 44.6 |
| Alberta First | Jerry D. Barber | 1,695 | 25.9 |
| Liberal | Horst Schreiber | 1,114 | 17.0 |
| Social Credit | Robin Skitteral | 519 | 7.9 |
| New Democratic | Lilas Lysne | 227 | 3.5 |
| Green | Colleen Biggs | 73 | 1.1 |
| Turnout | | 6,552 | 33.6 |

== Plebiscite results ==
=== 1957 liquor plebiscite ===
1957 Alberta liquor plebiscite results: Wainwright
Question A: Do you approve additional types of outlets for the sale of beer, wine and spirituous liquor subject to a local vote?
| Ballot choice | Votes | % |
|---|---|---|
| No | 1,674 | 50.65% |
| Yes | 1,631 | 49.35% |
| Total votes | 3,305 | 100% |
| Rejected, spoiled and declined | 33 | |
6,897 eligible electors, turnout 48.40%

On October 30, 1957, a stand-alone plebiscite was held province wide in all 50 of the then current provincial electoral districts in Alberta. The government decided to consult Alberta voters to decide on liquor sales and mixed drinking after a divisive debate in the Legislature. The plebiscite was intended to deal with the growing demand for reforming antiquated liquor control laws.

The plebiscite was conducted in two parts. Question A, asked in all districts, asked the voters if the sale of liquor should be expanded in Alberta, while Question B, asked in a handful of districts within the corporate limits of Calgary and Edmonton, asked if men and women were allowed to drink together in establishments.

Province wide Question A of the plebiscite passed in 33 of the 50 districts while Question B passed in all five districts. Wainwright was divided on the issue with the vote almost being a tie. The voter turnout in the district was light but still slightly above the province wide average of 46%.

Official district returns were released to the public on December 31, 1957. The Social Credit government in power at the time did not consider the results binding. However the results of the vote led the government to repeal all existing liquor legislation and introduce an entirely new Liquor Act.

Municipal districts lying inside electoral districts that voted against the plebiscite such as Wainwright were designated Local Option Zones by the Alberta Liquor Control Board and considered effective dry zones. Business owners who wanted a licence had to petition for a binding municipal plebiscite in order to be granted a licence.

== See also ==
- List of Alberta provincial electoral districts
- Canadian provincial electoral districts
- Wainwrite, a town in Alberta
