= Doug Griffiths =

Canadian politician

The Honourable Doug Griffiths ECA

Member of the Legislative Assembly of Alberta
- In office 2004–2015
- Preceded by: New riding
- Succeeded by: Wes Taylor
- Constituency: Battle River-Wainwright
- In office 2002–2004
- Preceded by: Robert Fischer
- Succeeded by: Riding abolished
- Constituency: Wainwright

Personal details
- Born: 26 October 1972 (age 53) Coronation, Alberta
- Party: Alberta Party
- Other political affiliations: Progressive Conservative (former)
- Spouse: Sue
- Children: Austin and Brady
- Education: University of Alberta
- Occupation: Teacher, speaker, author
- Website: www.13ways.ca

Douglas Gordon Griffiths ECA (born 26 October 1972) is the president and chief executive officer of 13 Ways, Inc., a company he founded to provide consultation to struggling North American communities. He is a public speaker and co-author of the book 13 Ways to Kill Your Community, now in its second edition, and is an instructor with the Executive Education program at the University of Alberta School of Business.

Griffiths is a former Canadian politician and Member of the Legislative Assembly of Alberta representing the constituency of Battle River-Wainwright as a Progressive Conservative (PC). He was a candidate for the leadership of the PC Party in the 2011 leadership election. He has since taken a step back from provincial politics, in favour of his role with 13 Ways and his teaching duties.

== 13 Ways, Inc. ==
13 Ways began as a book, and has since developed into a consulting company and a speaking tour series delivered across North America. The book is written in a satirical style, with a "straight-shooting, no-punches-pulled approach" detailing the various ways in which one might kill a community; i.e. through failure to provide clean water, reliable Internet services, and a place where youth will return to raise families and retire. The concept has since branched out and now incorporates a speaking series, syndicated columns, blog, and newsletter, in addition to offering consultation to struggling communities.

== Education ==
Griffiths attended the University of Alberta, where he earned an honours degree in philosophy and an education degree. After university, he taught for three years at Byemoor School], in the County of Stettler No. 6. He was nominated for a teaching award each year, including two nominations for the PanCanadian Students' Choice Award.

== Political career ==
Griffiths received 79 per cent of the vote in Battle River-Wainwright during the 2008 provincial election, sending him to the Legislature for his third term. In addition to his duties as an MLA, he has served as Parliamentary Assistant for the Department of Finance and Enterprise and is currently a member of the Public Accounts Committee and Health Committee.

Griffiths was first elected in a by-election for the Wainwright constituency on 8 April 2002, after former incumbent Robert Fischer resigned amidst a conflict-of-interest investigation by the Ethics Commissioner. Then 29, Griffiths was the youngest MLA in office at the time.

The Wainwright boundaries changed for the 2004 provincial election, creating the current Battle River-Wainwright constituency, which Griffiths won with support from 65 per cent of the voters.

During his tenure as MLA, Griffiths was the parliamentary assistant to the Minister of Agriculture and Rural Development, and has been involved in numerous committees and has chaired the Standing Committee on Energy and Sustainable Development, Rural Development Strategies Task Force, MLA Steering Committee for Rural Development, and was vice-chair of the Standing Committee on Public Accounts.

On 12 October 2011 Griffiths was appointed Minister of Alberta Municipal Affairs by Premier Alison Redford.

Griffiths was reelected in the 23 April 2012 provincial election as an incumbent PC candidate.

On 13 December 2013, Griffiths was sworn in as Minister of Service Alberta.

On 26 January 2015, he resigned from his position as a MLA.

== Election results ==
=== 2004 ===
2004 Alberta general election: Battle River-Wainwright
Party	Candidate	Votes	%	±%
Progressive Conservative	Doug Griffiths	6,406	65.02%	–
Alberta Alliance	Orest Werezak	1,442	14.64%	–
Liberal	Gordon Rogers	1,069	10.85%	–
New Democratic	Len Legault	616	6.25%	–
Social Credit	Robin Skitteral	320	3.25%	–
Total		9,853	–	–
Rejected, spoiled and declined		32	–	–
Eligible electors / turnout		20,368	48.53%	–
Progressive Conservative pickup new district.				
Source(s) Source: "Elections Alberta 2004 General Election". Elections Alberta.

=== 2008 ===
2008 Alberta general election: Battle River-Wainwright
Party	Candidate	Votes	%	±%
Progressive Conservative	Doug Griffiths	7,968	78.56%	13.55%
Liberal	Horst Schreiber	1,260	12.42%	1.57%
Green	William Munsey	483	4.76%	–
New Democratic	Doris Bannister	431	4.25%	-2.00%
Total		10,142	–	–
Rejected, spoiled and declined		129	–	–
Eligible electors / turnout		21,064	48.76%	0.23%
Progressive Conservative hold		Swing		7.88%
Source(s) The Report on the March 3, 2008 Provincial General Election of the Twenty-seventh Legislative Assembly. Elections Alberta. 28 July 2008. pp. 368–371. "Elections Alberta 2012 General Election". Elections Alberta.

=== 2012 ===
2012 Alberta general election: Battle River-Wainwright
Party	Candidate	Votes	%	±%
Progressive Conservative	Doug Griffiths	7,202	46.70%	-31.86%
Wildrose	Dave Nelson	6,709	43.51%	–
New Democratic	Terry Zawalski	776	5.03%	0.78%
Liberal	Amber Greenleese	469	3.04%	-9.38%
Alberta Party	Midge Lambert	265	1.72%	–
Total		15,421	–	–
Rejected, spoiled and declined		87	–	–
Eligible electors / turnout		25,863	59.96%	11.20%
Progressive Conservative hold		Swing		-31.47%
Source(s) Source: "Elections Alberta 2012 General Election". Elections Alberta.
