= Battle River-Wainwright =

Defunct provincial electoral district in Alberta, Canada

Alberta electoral district
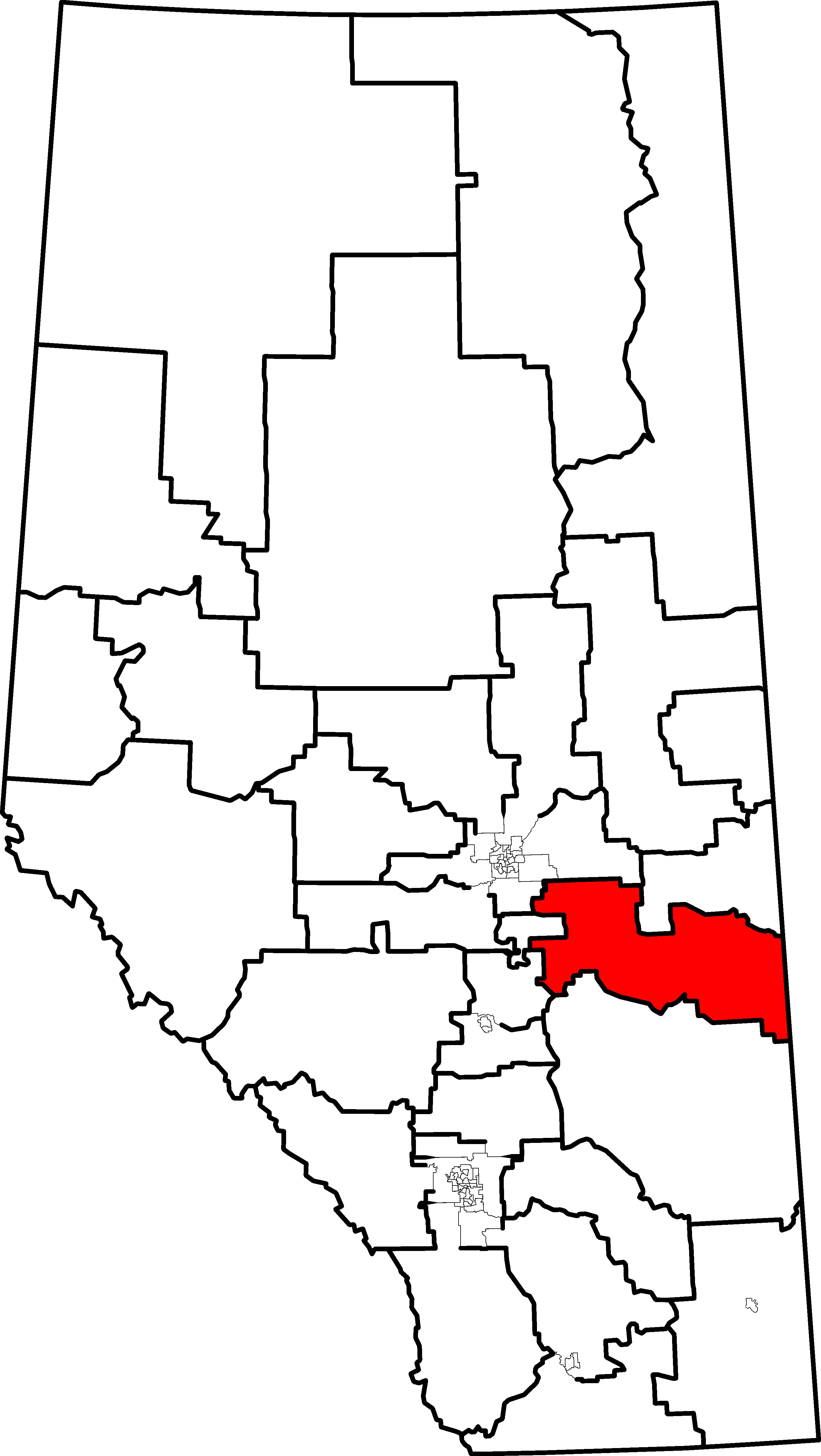
- 2010 boundaries

Defunct provincial electoral district
- Legislature: Legislative Assembly of Alberta
- District created: 2003
- District abolished: 2019
- First contested: 2004
- Last contested: 2015

Battle River-Wainwright was a provincial electoral district in Alberta, Canada mandated to return a single member to the Legislative Assembly of Alberta using the first-past-the-post method of voting from 2004 to 2019.

== History ==
The electoral district was created in the 2003 electoral boundary re-distribution primarily out of the old electoral district of Wainwright which had been in existence since the 1913 boundary redistribution.

The 2010 electoral boundary re-distribution saw significant changes to the district with Paintearth County being moved into Drumheller-Stettler. The district also lost land to Fort Saskatchewan-Vegreville that was south of Tofield, Alberta within Beaver County. However land was gained from three other electoral divisions that resided within Camrose County.

Prior to the 2019 election this district was disbanded to make the Vermilion-Lloydminster-Wainwright district.

=== Boundary history ===
47 Battle River-Wainwright 2003 boundaries
Bordering districts
North	East	West	South
Fort Saskatchewan-Vegreville, Leduc-Beaumont-Devon and Vermilion-Lloydminster	Saskatchewan boundary	Drumheller-Stettler, Lacombe-Ponoka and Wetaskiwin-Camrose	Drumheller-Stettler
riding map goes here			
Legal description from Electoral Divisions Act, S.A. 2003, c. E-4.1
Starting at the east boundary of Rge. 19 W4 (Highway 834) with the north boundary of Twp. 47; then 1. east along the north boundary of Twp. 47 to the east boundary of Sec. 31 in Twp. 47, Rge. 16 W4; 2. south along the east boundary of Secs. 31, 30, 19, 18, 7 and 6 to the north boundary of Twp. 46; 3. east along the north boundary to the east boundary of Sec. 32 in Twp. 46, Rge. 14 W4; 4. south along the east boundary of Secs. 32, 29, 20 and 17 to the north boundary of Sec. 9 in the Twp.; 5. east along the north boundary of Secs. 9, 10, 11 and 12 in the Twp. to the east boundary of Rge. 14 W4; 6. south along the east boundary to the north boundary of Sec. 6 in Twp. 46, Rge. 13 W4; 7. east along the north boundary of Secs. 6, 5, 4 and 3 to the east boundary of Sec. 3 in the Twp.; 8. south along the east boundary to the north boundary of Twp. 45; 9. east along the north boundary to the east boundary of Sec. 5 in Twp. 46, Rge. 10 W4; 10. north along the east boundary of Secs. 5, 8, 17, 20, 29 and 32 in the Twp. to the north boundary of Twp. 46; 11. west along the north boundary to the east boundary of the west half of Sec. 5 in Twp. 47, Rge. 10 W4; 12. north along the east boundary of the west half of Secs. 5, 8, 17, 20, 29 and 32 in the Twp. and the east boundary of the west half of Secs. 5, 8 and 17 in Twp. 48, Rge. 10 W4 to the north boundary of Sec. 17 in the Twp.; 13. east along the north boundary of Secs. 17, 16, 15, 14 and 13 in the Twp. to the east boundary of Rge. 10 W4; 14. south along the east boundary to the north boundary of the south half of Sec. 18 in Twp. 48, Rge. 9 W4; 15. east along the north boundary of the south half of Sec. 18 to the east boundary of Sec. 18; 16. north along the east boundary to the north boundary of Sec. 17 in the Twp.; 17. east along the north boundary of Secs. 17, 16, 15 and 14 to the east boundary of the west half of Sec. 14 in the Twp.; 18. south along the east boundary to the north boundary of the south half of Sec. 14 in the Twp.; 19. east along the north boundary of the south half of Secs. 14 and 13 to the east boundary of the west half of Sec. 13 in the Twp.; 20. south along the east boundary to the north boundary of Sec. 12 in the Twp.; 21. east along the north boundary to the east boundary of Rge. 9 W4; 22. south along the east boundary to the north boundary of Sec. 6 in Twp. 48, Rge. 8 W4; 23. east along the north boundary to the east boundary of the west half of Sec. 6 in the Twp.; 24. south along the east boundary to the north boundary of the south half of the Sec. 6 in the Twp.; 25. east along the north boundary to the east boundary of Sec. 6 in the Twp.; 26. south along the east boundary to the north boundary of Twp. 47; 27. east along the north boundary to the east boundary of Sec. 33 in Twp. 47, Rge. 8 W4; 28. south along the east boundary to the north boundary of the south half of Sec. 34 in the Twp.; 29. east along the north boundary to the east boundary of the Sec. 34 in the Twp.; 30. south along the east boundary to the north boundary of Sec. 26 in the Twp.; 31. east along the north boundary of Secs. 26 and 25 to the east boundary of the west half of the Sec. 25 in the Twp.; 32. south along the east boundary to the north boundary of Sec. 24 in the Twp.; 33. east along the north boundary to the east boundary of Rge. 8 W4; 34. south along the east boundary to the north boundary of Sec. 18 in Twp. 47, Rge. 7 W4; 35. east along the north boundary of Secs. 18, 17, 16, 15, 14 and 13 in Twp. 47, Rges. 7 and 6 W4 and the north boundary of Sec. 18 and 17 in Twp. 47, Rge. 5 W4 to the right bank of the Battle River; 36. downstream along the right bank to the east boundary of the Province; 37. south along the east boundary of the Province to the north boundary of Twp. 35; 38. west along the north boundary of Twp. 35 to the east boundary of Sec. 4 in Twp. 36, Rge. 2 W4; 39. north along the east boundary of Secs. 4, 9, 16 and 21 to the north boundary of Sec. 21; 40. west along the north boundary of Secs. 21, 20 and 19 in the Twp. and Secs. 24, 23 and 22 in Twp. 36, Rge. 3 W4 to the east boundary of Sec. 28; 41. north along the east boundary of Secs. 28 and 33 in the Twp. and Secs. 4, 9, 16, 21, 28 and 33 in Twp. 37, Rge. 3 W4 to the north boundary of Twp. 37; 42. west along the north boundary of Twp. 37 to the east boundary of Rge. 9 W4; 43. south along the east boundary of Rge. 9 W4 to the north boundary of Sec. 12 in Twp. 37; 44. west along the north boundary of Secs. 12 and 11 to the east boundary of Sec. 10; 45. south along the east boundary of Secs. 10 and 3 to the north boundary of Twp. 36; 46. west along the north boundary of Twp. 36 to the east boundary of Sec. 32 in Twp. 36, Rge. 9 W4; 47. south along the east boundary of Secs. 32, 29, 20, 17, 8 and 5 in the Twp. and Secs. 32, 29, 20, 17 and 8 in Twp. 35, Rge. 9 W4 to the north boundary of Sec. 5 in the Twp.; 48. west along the north boundary of Secs. 5 and 6 to the east boundary of Rge. 10 W4; 49. south along the east boundary of Rge. 10 W4 to the north boundary of Twp. 34; 50. west along the north boundary to the west shore of Sullivan Lake; 51. northwesterly along the west bank to the north boundary of Sec. 9 in Twp. 36, Rge. 15 W4; 52. west along the north boundary of Secs. 9, 8 and 7 in the Twp. and the north boundary of Secs. 12, 11 and 10 in Twp. 36, Rge. 16 W4 to the east boundary of Sec. 16 in the Twp.; 53. north along the east boundary of Secs. 16, 21, 28 and 33 to the north boundary of Twp. 36; 54. west along the north boundary to the east boundary of Sec. 5 in Twp. 37, Rge. 16 W4; 55. north along the east boundary of Secs. 5, 8, 17, 20, 29 and 32 in Twps. 37, 38, 39 and 40 and the east boundary of Secs. 5 and 8 in Twp. 41, Rge. 16 W4 to the right bank of the Battle River; 56. upstream along the right bank to the north boundary of Twp. 42; 57. west along the north boundary of Twp. 42 to the east boundary of Rge. 19; 58. south along the east boundary of Rge. 19 W4 to the north boundary of Sec. 24 in Twp. 42, Rge. 19 W4; 59. west along the north boundary of Secs. 24, 23, 22 and 21 to Highway 56; 60. north along Highway 56 to the north boundary of Twp. 45; 61. east along the north boundary of Twp. 45 to the east boundary of Rge. 19 W4; 62. north along the east boundary of Rge. 19 W4 to the starting point.
Note:

51 Battle River-Wainwright 2010 boundaries
Bordering districts
North	East	West	South
Fort Saskatchewan-Vegreville, Strathcona-Sherwood Park and Vermilion-Lloydminster	Saskatchewan boundary	Lacombe-Ponoka, Leduc-Beaumont and Wetaskiwin-Camrose	Drumheller-Stettler
Legal description from the Statutes of Alberta 2010, Electoral Divisions Act.

Members for Battle River-Wainwright
Assembly	Years	Member	Party
See Wainwright 1913-2004
26th	2004-2008	Doug Griffiths	Progressive; Conservative
27th	2008–2012	Doug Griffiths	Progressive; Conservative
28th	2012–2015	Doug Griffiths	Progressive; Conservative
29th	2015–2017	Wes Taylor	Wildrose
29th	2017–2019	Wes Taylor	United Conservative
See Vermilion-Lloydminster-Wainwright, Camrose and Drumheller-Stettler 2019–

=== Electoral history ===
The electoral district was created in the 2003 boundary redistribution mostly from the old Wainwright electoral district that had a long history going back to 1913. Since 1971 Progressive Conservative candidates had been returned to office here with large majorities.

The current incumbent and only representative so far is Doug Griffiths who was first elected in a 2002 by-election. He won the new district and his second term with a landslide majority which he also increased in the next election. In 2011 Griffiths was appointed to the cabinet in the government of Premier Allison Redford.

== Legislative election results ==
=== 2004 ===
2004 Alberta general election
Party	Candidate	Votes	%	±%
Progressive Conservative	Doug Griffiths	6,406	65.02%	–
Alberta Alliance	Orest Werezak	1,442	14.64%	–
Liberal	Gordon Rogers	1,069	10.85%	–
New Democratic	Len Legault	616	6.25%	–
Social Credit	Robin Skitteral	320	3.25%	–
Total		9,853	–	–
Rejected, spoiled and declined		32	–	–
Eligible electors / turnout		20,368	48.53%	–
Progressive Conservative pickup new district.				
Source(s) Source: "Elections Alberta 2004 General Election". Elections Alberta.

=== 2008 ===
2008 Alberta general election
Party	Candidate	Votes	%	±%
Progressive Conservative	Doug Griffiths	7,968	78.56%	13.55%
Liberal	Horst Schreiber	1,260	12.42%	1.57%
Green	William Munsey	483	4.76%	–
New Democratic	Doris Bannister	431	4.25%	-2.00%
Total		10,142	–	–
Rejected, spoiled and declined		129	–	–
Eligible electors / turnout		21,064	48.76%	0.23%
Progressive Conservative hold		Swing		7.88%
Source(s) The Report on the March 3, 2008 Provincial General Election of the Twenty-seventh Legislative Assembly. Elections Alberta. July 28, 2008. pp. 368–371. "Elections Alberta 2012 General Election". Elections Alberta.

=== 2012 ===
2012 Alberta general election
Party	Candidate	Votes	%	±%
Progressive Conservative	Doug Griffiths	7,202	46.70%	-31.86%
Wildrose	Dave Nelson	6,709	43.51%	–
New Democratic	Terry Zawalski	776	5.03%	0.78%
Liberal	Amber Greenleese	469	3.04%	-9.38%
Alberta Party	Midge Lambert	265	1.72%	–
Total		15,421	–	–
Rejected, spoiled and declined		87	–	–
Eligible electors / turnout		25,863	59.96%	11.20%
Progressive Conservative hold		Swing		-31.47%
Source(s) Source: "Elections Alberta 2012 General Election". Elections Alberta.

=== 2015 ===
2015 Alberta general election
Party	Candidate	Votes	%	±%
Wildrose	Wes Taylor	6,862	42.29%	-1.22%
Progressive Conservative	Blake Prior	5,057	31.17%	-15.54%
New Democratic	Gordon Naylor	3,807	23.46%	18.43%
Liberal	Ron Williams	500	3.08%	0.04%
Total		16,226	–	–
Rejected, spoiled and declined		41	–	–
Eligible electors / turnout		25,371	64.12%	4.15%
Wildrose gain from Progressive Conservative		Swing		3.96%
Source(s) Source: "Elections Alberta 2015 General Election". Elections Alberta.

== Senate nominee election results ==
=== 2004 ===
2004 Senate nominee election results: Battle River-Wainwright				Turnout 48.33%	
Affiliation	Candidate	Votes	% votes	% ballots	Rank
Progressive Conservative	Bert Brown	4,229	15.79%	50.80%	1
Progressive Conservative	Betty Unger	3,899	14.55%	46.72%	2
Progressive Conservative	Cliff Breitkreuz	3,691	13.78%	44.34%	3
Independent	Link Byfield	2,632	9.83%	31.62%	4
Progressive Conservative	David Usherwood	2,401	8.96%	28.84%	6
Alberta Alliance	Michael Roth	2,374	8.86%	28.52%	7
Progressive Conservative	Jim Silye	2,263	8.45%	27.18%	5
Alberta Alliance	Gary Horan	2,049	7.65%	24.61%	10
Alberta Alliance	Vance Gough	2,044	7.63%	24.55%	8
Independent	Tom Sindlinger	1,208	4.50%	14.51%	9
Total votes		26,790	100%		
Total ballots		8,325	3.22 votes per ballot		
Rejected, spoiled and declined		1,608			

Voters had the option of selecting four candidates on the ballot

== Student vote results ==
=== 2004 ===
Participating schools
Autumn Leaf School
Central High Sedgewick Public School
Coronation School
Daysland School
Dr. Folkins Community School
Edgerton Public School
Forestburg School
Lougheed School
Provost Public school
Saint Thomas Aquinas School

On November 19, 2004, a student vote was conducted at participating Alberta schools to parallel the 2004 Alberta general election results. The vote was designed to educate students and simulate the electoral process for persons who have not yet reached the legal majority. The vote was conducted in 80 of the 83 provincial electoral districts with students voting for actual election candidates. Schools with a large student body that reside in another electoral district had the option to vote for candidates outside of the electoral district then where they were physically located.

2004 Alberta student vote results
Affiliation	Candidate	Votes	%
Progressive Conservative	Doug Griffiths	483	59.56%
Alberta Alliance	Orest Werezak	167	20.59%
New Democratic	Len Legault	71	8.76%
Liberal	Gordon Rogers	68	8.38%
Social Credit	Robin Skitteral	22	2.71%
Total		811	100%
Rejected, spoiled and declined		38	

=== 2012 ===
2012 Alberta student vote results
Affiliation	Candidate	Votes	%
Progressive Conservative	Doug Griffiths		%
Wildrose	Dave Nelson		
Liberal	Amber Greenleese		%
NDP			%
Total			100%

== See also ==
- List of Alberta provincial electoral districts
- Canadian provincial electoral districts
