= Calgary-Montrose =

Defunct provincial electoral district in Alberta, Canada

Coordinates: 51.08°N 113.95°W

Calgary Montrose
Alberta electoral district
- 2004 boundaries

Defunct provincial electoral district
- Legislature: Legislative Assembly of Alberta
- District created: 1986
- District abolished: 2012
- First contested: 1986
- Last contested: 2008

Calgary Montrose was a provincial electoral district in Calgary, Alberta, Canada, mandated to return a single member to the Legislative Assembly of Alberta using the first past the post method of voting from 1986 to 2012.

== History ==
This urban district located in central east Calgary was created in the 1986 boundary re-distribution from Calgary-McCall. The district elected Progressive Conservative candidates for its entire history.

The district has seen its share of controversial elections in recent years. The last representative was Manmeet Bhullar, who won his first term in office in a controversial race over Independent Ron Leech in the 2008 general election. The previous representative was Hung Pham, who served from 1993 to 2004.

The Calgary-Montrose electoral district would be dissolved in the 2010 Alberta boundary re-distribution and would be re-distributed into the Calgary-East, Calgary-Greenway and Calgary-Cross electoral districts.

=== Boundary history ===
17 Calgary-Montrose 2003 boundaries
Bordering districts
North	East	West	South
Calgary-McCall	Airdrie-Chestermere	Calgary-East	Calgary-Fort
riding map goes here		map in relation to other districts in Alberta goes here	
Legal description from the Statutes of Alberta 2003, Electoral Divisions Act.
Starting at the intersection of 68 Street NE with 32 Avenue NE; then 1. east along 32 Avenue NE to the west boundary of Block 10, Plan 8411285 (Monterey Park Estates); 2. generally south, east and north along the block boundary to 32 Avenue NE; 3. east along 32 Avenue NE and its easterly extension to the east Calgary city boundary; 4. south along the east city boundary to 17 Avenue SE; 5. west along 17 Avenue SE to 52 Street SE; 6. north along 52 Street SE to 16 Avenue NE; 7. east along 16 Avenue NE to 68 Street NE; 8. north along 68 Street NE to the starting point.
Note:

Members of the Legislative Assembly for Calgary-Montrose
Assembly	Years	Member	Party
See: Calgary-McCall 1971-1986
21st	1986–1989	Rick Orman	Progressive Conservative
22nd	1989–1993	Rick Orman	Progressive Conservative
23rd	1993–1997	Hung Pham	Progressive Conservative
24th	1997–2001	Hung Pham	Progressive Conservative
25th	2001–2004	Hung Pham	Progressive Conservative
26th	2004–2008	Hung Pham	Progressive Conservative
27th	2008–2012	Manmeet Bhullar	Progressive Conservative

=== Electoral history ===
The electoral district was created in the 1986 boundary redistribution. The first election held that year saw Progressive Conservative candidate Rick Orman win a comfortable majority to pick up the seat for his party. He was easily re-elected in the 1989 general election with a larger majority. Orman retired from the legislature at dissolution in 1993.

The 1993 election saw Progressive Conservative candidate Hung Pham win a sizable majority to hold the seat for his party. He was re-elected three more times winning in the 1997, 2001 and 2004 general elections. He retired from the legislature in 2008 after a bitter fall out with the Progressive Conservatives.

The 2008 election saw Progressive Conservative candidate Manmeet Bhullar win a hotly contested race over Independent Ron Leech. The pair had been in a disputed nomination race before the general election with the PC constituency association choosing Leech and the party hand-choosing Bhullar as the representative. Leech would petition the Alberta Court of Queen's Bench to overturn the results of the election with allegations that Bhullar and his supporters spurring ineligible voters to cast ballots, interfering with and influencing ballots cast, and violating the secrecy of the voting process.

== Legislative election results ==
=== 1986 ===
1986 Alberta general election
Party	Candidate	Votes	%	±%
Progressive Conservative	Rick Orman	4,395	59.73%	–
New Democratic	Frank Gereau	2,035	27.66%	–
Liberal	Roly Thomas	710	9.65%	–
Representative	Adrian C. Janssens	218	2.96%	–
Total		7,358	–	–
Rejected, spoiled and declined		12	–	–
Eligible electors / turnout		19,816	37.19%	–
Progressive Conservative pickup new district.				
Source(s) Source: "Calgary-Montrose Official Results 1986 Alberta general election". Alberta Heritage Community Foundation.

=== 1989 ===
1989 Alberta general election
Party	Candidate	Votes	%	±%
Progressive Conservative	Rick Orman	5,044	54.62%	-5.11%
New Democratic	Frank Gereau	2,585	27.99%	0.34%
Liberal	Jamil Farhat	1,605	17.38%	7.73%
Total		9,234	–	–
Rejected, spoiled and declined		23	–	–
Eligible electors / turnout		21,545	42.97%	5.77%
Progressive Conservative hold		Swing		-2.72%
Source(s) Source: "Calgary-Montrose Official Results 1989 Alberta general election". Alberta Heritage Community Foundation.

=== 1993 ===
1993 Alberta general election
Party	Candidate	Votes	%	±%
Progressive Conservative	Hung Pham	4,866	48.14%	-6.49%
Liberal	Keong Yap	2,592	25.64%	8.26%
New Democratic	Jean Munn	1,970	19.49%	-8.51%
Independent	Blaine Desjardine	613	6.06%	–
Natural Law	Chris Delucé	68	0.67%	–
Total		10,109	–	–
Rejected, spoiled and declined		27	–	–
Eligible electors / turnout		20,569	49.28%	6.31%
Progressive Conservative hold		Swing		-2.07%
Source(s) Source: "Calgary-Montrose Official Results 1993 Alberta general election". Alberta Heritage Community Foundation.

=== 1997 ===
1997 Alberta general election
Party	Candidate	Votes	%	±%
Progressive Conservative	Hung Pham	4,556	58.70%	10.56%
Liberal	Diane Danielson	2,576	33.19%	7.55%
Social Credit	Christopher Dick	536	6.91%	–
Natural Law	Neeraj Varma	94	1.21%	0.54%
Total		7,762	–	–
Rejected, spoiled and declined		18	–	–
Eligible electors / turnout		19,703	39.49%	-9.79%
Progressive Conservative hold		Swing		1.51%
Source(s) Source: "Calgary-Montrose Official Results 1997 Alberta general election". Alberta Heritage Community Foundation.

=== 2001 ===
2001 Alberta general election
Party	Candidate	Votes	%	±%
Progressive Conservative	Hung Pham	6,329	70.60%	11.90%
Liberal	Art Danielson	2,093	23.35%	-9.84%
New Democratic	Robert Scobel	543	6.06%	–
Total		8,965	–	–
Rejected, spoiled, and declined		31	–	–
Eligible electors / turnout		21,633	41.58%	2.10%
Progressive Conservative hold		Swing		10.87%
Source(s) Source: "Calgary-Montrose Official Results 2001 Alberta general election". Alberta Heritage Community Foundation.

=== 2004 ===
2004 Alberta general election
Party	Candidate	Votes	%	±%
Progressive Conservative	Hung Pham	3,323	51.30%	-19.30%
Liberal	Arthur Danielson	1,691	26.10%	2.76%
Alberta Alliance	Cyril Collingwood	689	10.64%	–
New Democratic	Jason Nishiyama	420	6.48%	0.43%
Greens	Kevin Colton	355	5.48%	–
Total		6,478	–	–
Rejected, spoiled and declined		31	–	–
Eligible electors / turnout		22,001	29.59%	-12.00%
Progressive Conservative hold		Swing		-11.03%
Source(s) Source: "Calgary-Montrose Official Results 2004 Alberta general election". Alberta Heritage Community Foundation.

=== 2008 ===
2008 Alberta general election
Party	Candidate	Votes	%	±%
Progressive Conservative	Manmeet Bhullar	2,627	34.45%	-16.84%
Independent	Ron Leech	2,010	26.36%	–
Liberal	Michael Embaie	1,396	18.31%	-7.80%
Wildrose Alliance	Said Abdulbaki	818	10.73%	0.09%
New Democratic	Al Brown	512	6.71%	0.23%
Green	Fred Clemens	262	3.44%	2.04%
Total		7,625	–	–
Rejected, spoiled and declined		55	–	–
Eligible electors / turnout		25,175	30.51%	0.92%
Progressive Conservative hold		Swing		-8.55%
Source(s) Source: The Report on the March 3, 2008 Provincial General Election of the Twenty-seventh Legislative Assembly (PDF). Elections Alberta. July 28, 2008. pp. 234–237.

== Senate nominee election results ==
=== 2004 ===
2004 Senate nominee election results: Calgary-Montrose				Turnout 29.39%	
Affiliation	Candidate	Votes	% votes	% ballots	Rank
Progressive Conservative	Bert Brown	2,587	15.71%	50.55%	1
Progressive Conservative	Betty Unger	2,198	13.35%	42.95%	2
Progressive Conservative	Jim Silye	2,032	12.34%	39.70%	5
Progressive Conservative	David Usherwood	1,712	10.40%	33.45%	6
Progressive Conservative	Cliff Breitkreuz	1,529	9.29%	29.88%	3
Independent	Link Byfield	1,435	8.72%	28.04%	4
Alberta Alliance	Vance Gough	1,306	7.93%	25.52%	8
Alberta Alliance	Michael Roth	1,280	7.77%	25.01%	7
Alberta Alliance	Gary Horan	1,233	7.49%	24.09%	10
Independent	Tom Sindlinger	1,153	7.00%	22.53%	9
Total votes		16,465	100%		
Total ballots		5,118	3.22 votes per ballot		
Rejected, spoiled and declined		1,349			

Voters had the option of selecting four candidates on the ballot

== 2004 student vote results ==
Participating schools
St. Martha School

On November 19, 2004, a student vote was conducted at participating Alberta schools to parallel the 2004 Alberta general election results. The vote was designed to educate students and simulate the electoral process for persons who have not yet reached the legal majority. The vote was conducted in 80 of the 83 provincial electoral districts with students voting for actual election candidates. Schools with a large student body that reside in another electoral district had the option to vote for candidates outside of the electoral district then where they were physically located.

2004 Alberta student vote results
Affiliation	Candidate	Votes	%
Progressive Conservative	Hung Pham	7	35.00%
Green	Kevin Colton	6	30.00%
Liberal	Arthur Danielson	5	25.00%
Alberta Alliance	Cyril Collingwood	1	5.00%
NDP	Jason Nishiyama	1	5.00%
Total		20	100%
Rejected, spoiled and declined		0	

== See also ==
- List of Alberta provincial electoral districts
- Canadian provincial electoral districts
