= Carl Benito =

Canadian politician

Member of the Legislative Assembly of Alberta for Edmonton-Mill Woods
- In office March 3, 2008 – April 22, 2012
- Preceded by: Weslyn Mather
- Succeeded by: Sohail Quadri

Personal details
- Born: February 21, 1954 (age 72) Manila, Philippines
- Party: Progressive Conservative

Carlito M. Benito (born February 21, 1954) is a former Filipino Canadian politician from Alberta. Benito served as the member of Legislative Assembly of Alberta (MLA) for the electoral district of Edmonton-Mill Woods from 2008 to 2012 as a member of the Progressive Conservative.

== Early life and career ==
Benito was born February 21, 1954, in Manila, Philippines. He immigrated to Canada in 1982. He worked as a real estate and insurance agent.

== Political career ==
In the 2001 Alberta election, Benito ran as the Progressive Conservative candidate for the riding of Edmonton-Mill Woods but lost to Weslyn Mather.

He ran again in 2008, this time defeating Mather. He described himself as Alberta's first Filipino MLA.

In 2012, Benito lost the Progressive Conservative nomination for his riding, placing third behind Sohail Quadri and Ron Randhawa. He ran in the 2012 election as an independent. He lost the election, placing fifth.

=== Controversies ===
During his 2008 election campaign, Benito pledged would donate his salary as an MLA (approximately $75,000) to a scholarship fund. He later claimed that he did not mean he would give away his entire salary, just a part of it.

Benito blamed his wife for a failure to pay property taxes on their rental properties. Benito later paid the taxes after the matter was covered in a front-page Edmonton Journal article.

In October 2022, Benito, together with his son, Charles Benito, pleaded guilty to immigration fraud. Benito was fined $75,000 for the offence.

== Election results ==
=== 2001 general election ===
2001 Alberta general election results		Turnout 54.39%	
Affiliation	Candidate	Votes	%
Liberal	Don Massey	4,920	48.97%
Progressive Conservative	Carl Benito	4,402	43.81%
New Democratic	Mel Buffalo	725	7.22%

2008 Alberta general election results (Edmonton-Mill Woods)		Turnout 40.1%	
Affiliation	Candidate	Votes	%
Progressive Conservative	Carl Benito	4752	44%
Liberal	Weslyn Mather	3996	37%
NDP	Christina Gray	1474	14%
Wildrose Alliance	Robert Leddy	320	3%
Green	David A. Hrushka	290	3%

2012 Alberta general election: Edmonton-Mill Woods
Party	Candidate	Votes	%	±%
Progressive Conservative	Sohail Quadri	4,942	35.21%	-8.66%
Wildrose Alliance	Joanne Autio	3,312	23.60%	20.64%
Liberal	Weslyn Mather	2,988	21.29%	-15.60%
New Democratic	Sandra Azocar	1,985	14.14%	0.54%
Independent	Carl Benito	545	3.88%	–
Alberta Party	Robert Leddy	262	1.87%	–
Total		14,034	–	–
Rejected, spoiled and declined		111	68	7
Eligible electors / turnout		25,920	54.60%	15.49%
Progressive Conservative hold		Swing		2.32%
Source(s) Source: "41 - Edmonton-Mill Woods, 2012 Alberta general election". officialresults.elections.ab.ca. Elections Alberta. Chief Electoral Officer (2012). The Report of the Chief Electoral Officer on the 2011 Provincial Enumeration and Monday, April 23, 2012 Provincial General Election of the Twenty-eighth Legislative Assembly (PDF) (Report). Edmonton, Alta.: Elections Alberta. Archived (PDF) from the original on May 6, 2021.
