= Rick Orman =

Canadian politician

The Honourable Rick Orman ECA
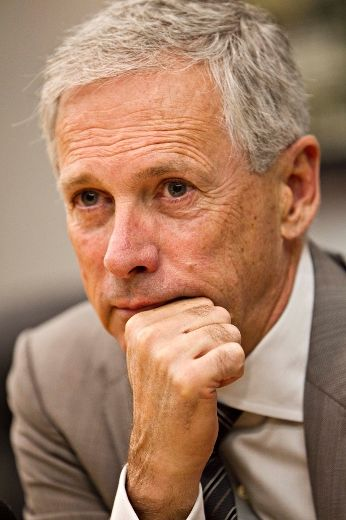

Member of the Legislative Assembly of Alberta for Calgary-Montrose
- In office 1986–1993
- Preceded by: new district
- Succeeded by: Hung Pham

Personal details
- Born: June 9, 1948 (age 78) Calgary, Alberta
- Party: Progressive Conservative Association of Alberta / United Conservative Party / Conservative Party of Canada
- Spouse: Michelle
- Children: Sean, Riley, Cayley
- Education: University of Calgary, Eastern Washington University

Richard D. "Rick" Orman is a Canadian businessman and former politician. Orman was born in Calgary, Alberta fourth generation Albertan. He studied at the University of Calgary before graduating with honors from Eastern Washington University in 1971. Orman was a member of the Legislative Assembly of Alberta from 1986 to 1993. Since 1993, he has been active within the business community, both provincially and internationally.

== Early career: 1975–1983 ==
Following the formation of the first Peter Lougheed Progressive Conservative government in 1971, Orman was executive assistant to two successive Alberta energy and resources ministers from 1972 to 1975.

Orman first became a member of the Canadian Association of Petroleum Landmen in 1972 and in 1977 Orman co-founded Orman & Benini Land Services (subsequently Canadian Landmasters Resource Services). In 1979, he joined Signalta Resources Ltd., a joint venture partnership where he was manager of land and contracts until 1982. In 1982 he founded Nexus Resources Ltd., a private Calgary-based exploration company.

From 1980 to 1985, Orman was non-operating partner of the board for CorpSport International Inc., an Edmonton-based sports management firm.

== Political career ==
In 1983 Orman ran unsuccessfully for the Federal Progressive Conservative nomination in Calgary Centre, finishing second to incumbent Harvie Andre. At the time it was one of the largest nominations in Canadian PC party history, with more than 3,200 ballots cast.

In 1985 Orman was a senior Calgary organizer for the successful Don Getty provincial PC leadership campaign.

IN 1986 and 1989 he was unopposed as candidate for the provincial PC Party, and acclaimed as its candidate, for the constituency of Calgary Montrose. He served Calgary Montrose in the Alberta Legislature from 1986 until his retirement from elected politics in 1993.

In 1992 Orman ran in a field of nine candidates for the Progressive Conservative leadership and placed third to eventual winner Environment Minister and former Calgary Mayor Ralph Klein.

In 2011 he again ran for the leadership of the PC party losing to the eventual winner Justice Minister Alison Redford.

Orman was president of the Calgary Centre Federal Conservative Association from February 2014 to May 2015.

In the wake of the NDP victory in Alberta May 5, 2015, Orman was a co-organizer of the first "unite the right" Alberta conservative movement held in Red Deer on February 19, 2016 (February 19 Committee). The committee followed up with an open assembly of province-wide small "c" conservatives concerned with vote splitting by the two right of centre parties (PC's and Wild Rose). The first assembly was held April 30 at Red Deer College and more than 500 conservatives attended. In July 2017, The two parties announced the merger to form the United Conservative Party.

The Premier of Alberta and Leader of the United Conservative Party of Alberta Jason Kenney resigned on 19 May 2022 and the Party set the date for a Leadership Convention.

On June 18, 2022 the Leadership Election Committee (LEC) of the United Conservative Party appointed Orman as Chief Returning Officer for its leadership vote October 6, 2022 which saw Danielle Smith elected leader and premier.

Orman was appointed Co-Chair of the 2024 UCP Leaders Dinner Committee.There were 1,300 attendees at the sold-out event held at the BMO Centre April 3, 2024.In January 2025 Orman was re-appointed Co-Chair of the Leaders Dinner. The dinner sold out for the 3rd straight year.

== Legislative career: 1986–1993 ==
Elected to the Alberta Legislature in May 1986, Orman held three Cabinet portfolios.

Orman served the constituency of Calgary Montrose for the Progressive Conservatives from 1986 to 1993.

=== Minister of Career Development and Employment: 1986–1988 ===
Following his election in 1986, Orman was appointed the Minister of Career Development and Employment, where he served until September 1988. He was also responsible for lotteries, exhibitions and fairs, and was a member of the Economic Planning Cabinet Committee.

As Career Development and Employment Minister, Orman developed and implemented the Labour Market Strategy, Community Facilities Enhancement Program and the Employment Alternatives Program which aided social assistance recipients in entering the job market. He also established the Immigration and Settlement Services Advisory Council and opened a Business Immigration Office in Hong Kong, leading two investment missions throughout Southeast Asia.

=== Minister of Labour: 1988–1989 ===
In September 1988, Orman was appointed Minister of Labour, a position he held until March 1989. As Labour Minister, he was responsible for the Department of Labour, the Alberta Labour Relations Board, and the Personnel Administration Office. During his tenure, Orman was responsible for the Human Rights Commission and implemented major changes to the Labour Relations Code.

He served as vice-chairman of the Labour Relations Committee and appointed to the Priorities, Finance and Coordination Committee of Cabinet and Treasury Board.

=== Minister of Energy: 1989–1992 ===
From 1989 to 1992, Orman was Minister of Energy, where he was responsible for the Department of Energy, Energy Resources Conservation Board, Alberta Oil Sands Equity, Alberta Petroleum Marketing Commission, Public Utilities Board, and Alberta Oil Sands Technology and Research Authority.

During this time, Orman was appointed chairman of the Energy Committee of Cabinet, chairman of Economic Planning Committee of Cabinet, and continued on the Priorities, Finance and Coordination Committee of Cabinet and Treasury Board. Additionally, Orman was instrumental in the establishment of the Natural Resources Conservation Board. As chairman of Economic Planning Committee, Orman played a lead role in planning and organizing Towards 2000 Together – a province-wide consultative initiative that sought public input into how Alberta could prepare for, and prosper in, the decade ahead.

Orman led many of Alberta's energy negotiations and took part in frequent speaking engagements on both national and international stages. During his tenure, natural gas pipeline expansion to the United States was a primary focus. During his tenure the Iroguois Natural Gas Pipeline and Pacific Gas Transmission expansion to the US received approvals. As Minister of Energy he was actively involved in the natural gas pricing contract dispute between Alberta producers and California Public Utilities Commission. He also played a leading role in organizing and co-chairing the first federal-provincial energy and environment ministers joint meeting on Climate Change held in Kananaskis, Alberta.

In 1992 Orman oversaw significant revisions to the Alberta Royalty regime, making the royalty price sensitive and more competitive in a changing world environment.

As Minister of Energy, Orman was a delegate to the Organization of the Petroleum Exporting Countries (OPEC), the United States Interstate Oil and Gas Compact Commission, and the South West Energy Council. Additionally, Orman was a founding member of the Clean Air Strategic Alliance – a group dedicated to managing a clean air environment. He also led energy related trade missions to Asia, the Middle East and Europe.

As senior Calgary minister, in 1991, Premier Don Getty assigned Orman the responsibility of saving the Calgary Stampeders Football Club from insolvency. The board of directors were released and the government took responsibility for all club liabilities.

Soon after, Orman on behalf of the government negotiated the sale of the team (including liabilities) to businessman Larry Ryckman. The team went on to win the Grey Cup in 1992.

== Career following political service: 1993–present ==
Since Orman's return to the private sector, he has remained active as an officer and board member in a number of privately held and publicly traded companies.

He currently operates a consultancy practice offering advice on government relations and public policy.

From 1994 to 1998, Orman founded and was chairman and CEO of Kappa Energy Company Inc., an international energy exploration company active in Yemen, Columbia and Egypt. In 1999, Kappa merged with Vanguard Oil Corporation, where Orman sat on the board of directors until 2000. In April 2003, he co-founded Exceed Energy Inc. and was executive vice-chairman until September 2005. He was founder, director and chief executive of NOR Energy AS from 2005 to 2011, a private company with assets in the North Sea, Tanzania, Australia and Czech Republic. He was also board director of Novatel Inc. (NASDAQ) until its takeover in 2007. Orman was a founding board director and Lead Director of Daylight Energy Ltd. (TSX). Daylight was acquired by Sinopec International Petroleum Exploration and Production Corp (SIPC) and he continued as independent director of Sinopec Daylight Energy Ltd. until July 2013. In November 2011 Orman was appointed by the Alberta Office of the Premier as Senior Advisor for the Northern Alberta Development Strategy. From September 2012-September 2023 he was chairman of the board of WesCan Energy Corp.(TSXV). From September 2015 to September 2018, he was Senior Counsel at Canadian Strategy Group. From April 26, 2016 to August 1, 2023 Orman was an independent non-executive director of Persta Resources Inc.(Hong Kong Stock Exchange) He also was Chairman of the Board of Sabre Inc from 2020-September 2025. He is on the board of directors of Spoke Resources Ltd.From 2021–2023 Orman has was CEO and director of Surmont Energy Ltd. He resigned as chairman of CannaPharmaRx Inc.(NASDAQ)1 January 2026.

On 23 August 2023, Rick Orman announced on X that he will contest for the presidency of the United Conservative Party at the AGM to be held at the Grey Eagle Resort on 3–4 November 2023.

== Community Activities and Volunteerism ==
Orman has been deeply involved in the Alberta volunteer community beginning with the YWCA, where he worked with inner-city children as a teen. Since then, he has been involved with the Calgary Chamber of Commerce, the Calgary Exhibition and Stampede, Citizen Advocacy for the Disabled and the Chrysalis Foundation for the Mentally and Physically Handicapped.

He played football at Crescent Heights High School (Calgary), Calgary Colts, University of Calgary and Eastern Washington University and subsequently coached Bantam and High School football in the Calgary area.

Additionally, Orman has been an honorary chairman for the Aga Khan Partnership Walk (Calgary, 1990 and 1991), Philippine Earthquake Disaster Relief Fund (Alberta, 1990), and the African Famine Relief (Alberta, 1992).

He is on the board of directors of Contemporary Calgary Art Gallery.

He has provided provincial and federal political commentary on the Canadian Broadcast Corporation, Global Television, CTV and the CKUA Radio Network.

== Honours and awards ==
- Eastern Washington University - Presidents Honor Roll 1971.
- Football Athletic scholarship.
- In 1991 as Minister of Energy he was awarded the prestigious Crossborder Award as the person who played the most significant role in enhancing natural gas trade between Canada and the United States.
- He received the 125th Anniversary of the Confederation of Canada Medal (1992) awarded to Canadians who were deemed to have made a significant contribution to their fellow citizens, to their community, or to Canada.
- In July 2011 Orman was selected by Alberta Venture Magazine as one of Alberta's 50 Most Influential People.
- Clean Air Strategic Award of Recognition as co-founder (along with former Environment Minister Ralph Klein) of The Clean Air Strategic Alliance.
- Queen's Platinum Jubilee Medal (2022) commemorating Her Majesty's 70th Anniversary as Monarch and is awarded to Albertans who have made a significant contribution to Canada and in particular to the Alberta region or community.

Legislative Assembly of Alberta
| Preceded by New District | MLA Calgary-Montrose; 1986–1993 | Succeeded by Hung Pham |
