= Wes Taylor (politician) =

Canadian politician

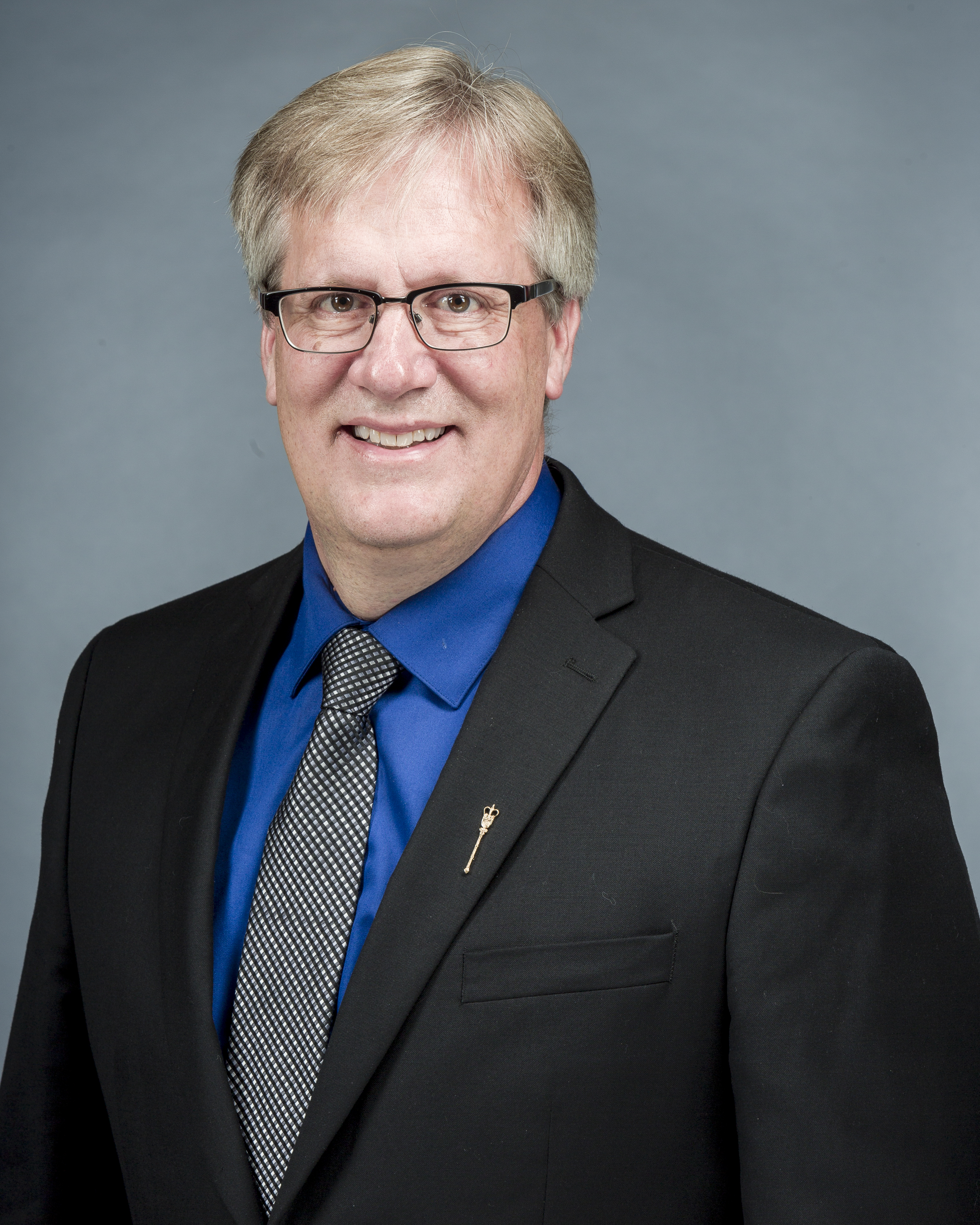

Member of the Legislative Assembly of Alberta for Battle River-Wainwright
- In office May 5, 2015 – March 19, 2019
- Preceded by: Doug Griffiths
- Succeeded by: district abolished

Personal details
- Born: 1962 or 1963 (age 63–64) Virden, Manitoba
- Party: United Conservative
- Other political affiliations: Wildrose (2015–17)
- Education: University of Alberta
- Occupation: businessman, teacher

Gordon Wesley Graham Taylor (born 1962) is a Canadian politician who was elected in the 2015 Alberta general election to the Legislative Assembly of Alberta representing the electoral district of Battle River-Wainwright.

== Electoral history ==
2015 Alberta general election: Battle River-Wainwright
Party	Candidate	Votes	%	±%
Wildrose	Wes Taylor	6,862	42.29%	-1.22%
Progressive Conservative	Blake Prior	5,057	31.17%	-15.54%
New Democratic	Gordon Naylor	3,807	23.46%	18.43%
Liberal	Ron Williams	500	3.08%	0.04%
Total		16,226	–	–
Rejected, spoiled and declined		41	–	–
Eligible electors / turnout		25,371	64.12%	4.15%
Wildrose gain from Progressive Conservative		Swing		3.96%
Source(s) Source: "Elections Alberta 2015 General Election". Elections Alberta.
