= Weslyn Mather =

Canadian politician (1945–2015)

Member of the Legislative Assembly of Alberta for Edmonton-Mill Woods
- In office 2004–2008
- Preceded by: Don Massey
- Succeeded by: Carl Benito

Personal details
- Born: Weslyn Melva Dunford; October 2, 1945 Lethbridge, Alberta
- Died: November 22, 2015 (aged 70) Edmonton, Alberta
- Party: Liberal
- Spouse: Dick Mather
- Occupation: psychologist, school administrator

Weslyn Melva Mather (née Dunford; October 2, 1945 – November 22, 2015) was a provincial politician in the Alberta, Canada. She served as a member in the Legislative Assembly of Alberta from 2004 to 2008 sitting with the Liberal caucus in opposition.

== Early life ==
Weslyn Mather was born in 1945. She married her husband Dick Mather in 1965. She worked as a psychologist and school administrator. In 1972 she sustained injuries in a car accident that left her in a wheelchair.

== Political career ==
Mather ran for a seat to the Alberta Legislature in the 2004 election as the Liberal candidate in the electoral district of Edmonton-Mill Woods. She won the election defeating Progressive Conservative candidate Naresh Bhardwaj in a hotly contested race.

Mather ran for a second term in office in the 2008 Alberta general election but was defeated by Progressive Conservative candidate Carl Benito. On November 22, 2015, she died at the age of 70 after an infection.
