= 2019 Alberta general election =

30th general election of Alberta, Canada

- April 16, 2019

87 seats in the Legislative Assembly of Alberta 44 seats needed for a majority
- Opinion polls
- Turnout: 67.5% (▲10.5pp)
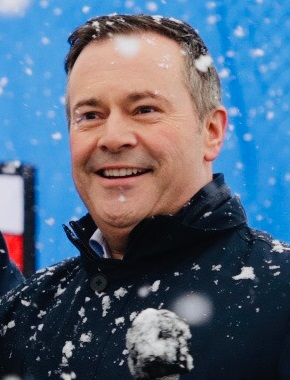

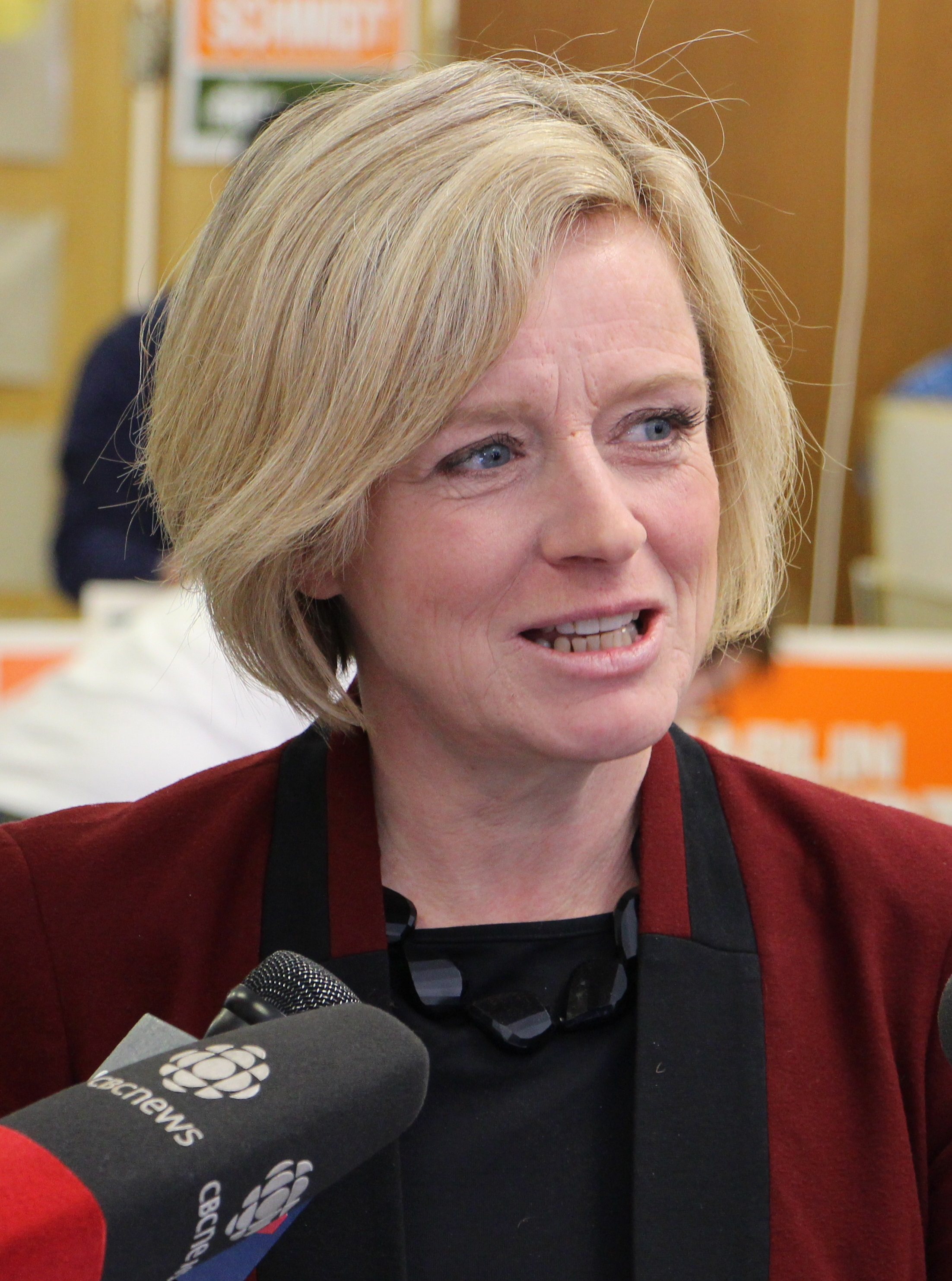

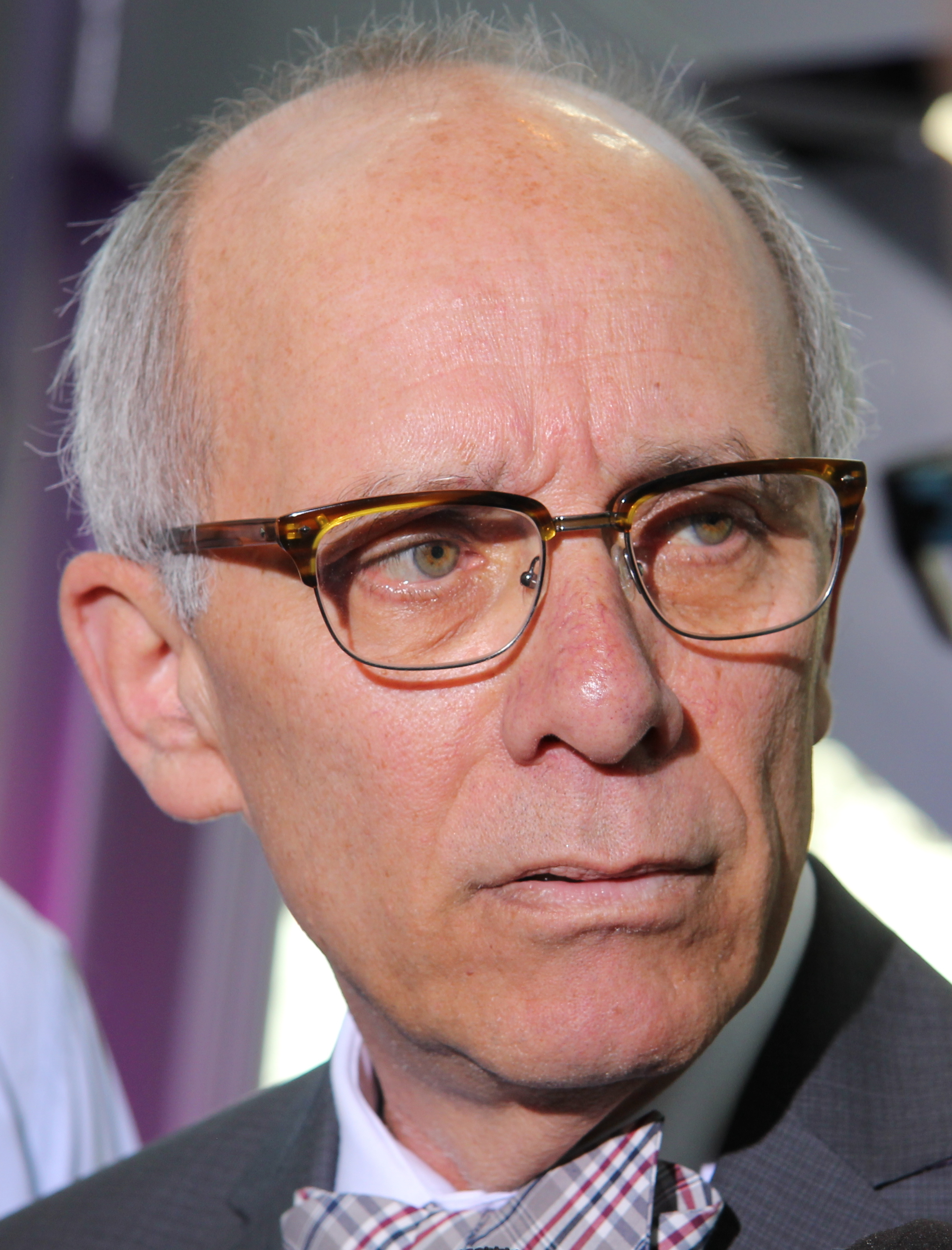
	Majority party	Minority party	Third party
Leader	Jason Kenney	Rachel Notley	Stephen Mandel
Party	United Conservative	New Democratic	Alberta Party
Leader since	October 28, 2017	October 18, 2014	February 27, 2018
Leader's seat	Calgary-Lougheed	Edmonton-Strathcona	Ran in Edmonton-McClung (lost)
Last election	30 seats, 52.02% (Note: Combined results of the Progressive Conservative (9 seats, 27.79%) and Wildrose (21 seats, 24.22%) parties in 2015 (parties merged in 2017).)	54 seats, 40.62%	1 seat, 2.23%
Seats before	25	52	3
Seats after	63	24	0
Seat change	▲38	▼28	▼3
Popular vote	1,040,004	619,147	171,996
Percentage	54.88%	32.67%	9.08%
Swing	▲2.87pp (Note: Difference compared to combined results of the Progressive Conservative and Wildrose parties in 2015 (parties merged in 2017).)	▼7.95pp	▲6.84pp
- Popular vote by riding. As this is a first-past-the-post election, seat totals are not determined by total popular vote, but instead by results in each riding. Riding names are listed at the bottom.
Premier before election
Rachel Notley
New Democratic
Premier after election
Jason Kenney
United Conservative

The 2019 Alberta general election was held on April 16, 2019, to elect 87 members to the 30th Alberta Legislature. In its first general election contest, the Jason Kenney-led United Conservative Party (UCP) won 54.88% of the popular vote and 63 seats, defeating incumbent Premier Rachel Notley. The governing Alberta New Democratic Party (NDP) were reduced to 24 seats and formed the Official Opposition. The United Conservative Party was formed in 2017 from a merger of the Progressive Conservative Party and the Wildrose Party after the NDP's victory in the 2015 election ended nearly 44 years of Progressive Conservative rule.

The NDP won 24 seats in total: including all but one of the seats in Edmonton (19), three seats in Calgary (Calgary-Buffalo, Calgary-McCall and Calgary-Mountain View), and the seats of Lethbridge-West and St. Albert. The UCP won the remaining 63 seats in the province. Two other parties that won seats in the 2015 election, the Alberta Party and the Alberta Liberals, failed to win any seats, making this election the first Alberta general election since 1993 where only two parties won seats.

The Election Act fixes the election date to a three-month period, between March 1 and May 31 in the fourth calendar year after the preceding election day, which in this case was May 5, 2015. However, this did not affect the powers of the Lieutenant Governor to dissolve the Legislative Assembly before this period.

This election resulted in the highest voter turnout since 1982 at 68%, rising from 57% in the last general election held in 2015. It marked only the fifth change of government since Alberta became a province in 1905, and also the first time an incumbent government failed to win a second term.

Across the province, 1,896,542 votes were cast in this election.

== Background ==
The 2015 Alberta general election resulted in a New Democratic majority government headed by Rachel Notley. The New Democrats surprise victory ended the 44-year government led by the Progressive Conservative Association of Alberta, becoming the fourth change in governing party in Alberta's 110 year history. The Wildrose Party formed the Official Opposition under leader Brian Jean, while the incumbent Progressive Conservatives came third place, but were left without a leader after Jim Prentice resigned as leader and disclaimed his seat. The Alberta Liberal Party elected one member with interim leader David Swann capturing his seat, while the Alberta Party elected its first candidate to the Legislature in leader Greg Clark.

Major changes in leadership of opposition parties occurred over the next four years. Former Conservative Party of Canada Member of Parliament and Minister Jason Kenney was elected in the 2017 Progressive Conservatives leadership election on a platform of uniting the right wing parties in Alberta which occurred after Wildrose members voted 95 per cent in favour of merging into the new United Conservative Party and forming the Official Opposition. Later the 2017 United Conservative Party leadership election saw Jason Kenney elected as party leader and leader of the Opposition.

The interim leader of the Alberta Liberal Party and sole Member of the Legislative Assembly declined to contest the 2017 Alberta Liberal Party leadership election, which saw David Khan elected leader of the party. The Alberta Party saw two Members of the Legislative Assembly cross the floor over the four year period. Party leader Greg Clark resigned as leader in 2017, and the 2018 Alberta Party leadership election saw former Progressive Conservative MLA and Edmonton Mayor Stephen Mandel elected as party leader.

=== Election finance changes ===
Following the NDP's election in 2015 the new government's first bill An Act to Renew Democracy in Alberta which amended the Election Finances and Contributions Disclosure Act was passed by the Legislature. The bill banned corporate and union donations to political parties, set rules for political parties accessing loans and reinforced that only Albertans are able to make political contributions. The next year the government introduced further amendments reducing political contributions from $15,000 per year to a total of $4,000 per year (inclusive of parties, constituency associations, candidates, leadership contests, and nominations). The election reforms were supported by the Wildrose opposition, but commentators pointed out the changes hurt the Progressive Conservatives which relied on large corporate donations. Reforms also limited party expenses to $2 million between the writ and when polls close, limiting candidates to $50,000 per general election and $23,000 for by-elections. Third party advertisers were limited to $150,000 during the official election period, and limited to $3,000 for supporting or opposing a candidate.

=== 2017 electoral boundary commission ===
The Electoral Boundaries Commission Act requires that a Commission be appointed during the first session of the Legislature following every second general election. The Commission requires a non-partisan chair, two government members recommended by the Premier, and two opposition members. Due to the decision by Premier Jim Prentice to call an early election in 2015, the Commission was required to be formed before the prescribed date in time for the next election in 2019. Previous Commissions had provided for modest redistributions in favour of Alberta's cities which according to Political Scientist Roger Epp brought forward "deep rural anxieties" regarding declining population and influence in Alberta.

The Commission was provided with a mandate which kept the size of the Legislature fixed at 87 seats. The Commission was appointed, led by Justice Myra Bielby, and made only incremental changes, adding one new seat in Calgary and Edmonton, as well as a seat in the Airdrie area. The Commission did, however, make significant statements on the rural-urban divide in Alberta, noting "Alberta is no longer entirely or primarily rural in nature" and a "disproportionate preservation of the rural voice" was no longer acceptable or feasible under law. While the Electoral Boundaries Commission Act permits up to four districts to be formed with a population 50 per cent lower than the average population, the Commission only recommended that two of these districts be formed. The districts include Central Peace-Notley which had a population of 28,993 and area of 47,311 km^{2} (18,267 sq mi), and Lesser Slave Lake which had a population of 27,818, compared to the average population of electoral districts of 46,803 following redistribution.

A minority opinion was presented by Commission members appointed by the opposition, arguing that Alberta's rate of growth was a threat to "a critical part of our history, culture, and primary economic voice" which is at risk of being lost through continued redistribution.

The previous redistribution occurred in 2010 when an additional four constituencies were added, increasing the number from 83 to the present 87. Following the 2016 Canadian census the largest constituency Calgary-South East had grown to 79,034, while the smallest constituency Dunvegan-Central Peace-Notley had a population of 25,192.

== Results ==
The United Conservative Party made a small improvement in its overall share of the popular vote compared to the combined vote of the Progressive Conservative and Wildrose parties which preceded it. The party won 63 seats. The UCP finished no lower than second place in any constituency. UCP leader Jason Kenney won re-election in his constituency.

The Alberta New Democratic Party lost about one-fifth of its vote share, although due to the considerably higher turnout compared to 2015 it actually gained votes. The NDP with 24 seats formed the opposition in the Alberta legislature. The NDP finished first or second in 85 out of 87 ridings. NDP leader and outgoing premier Rachel Notley won re-election in her constituency.

No other party elected any MLAs, with the centrist Alberta Party being the only other party to run a full slate of candidates. The Alberta Party more than quadrupled its overall popular vote, but failed to win any seats. All three Alberta Party incumbents were defeated, with former leader Greg Clark (the only MLA previously elected under the Alberta Party banner) being the only Alberta Party candidate to finish as high as second place. Current Alberta Party leader Stephen Mandel, a former mayor of Edmonton and PC cabinet minister, finished third in his own riding.

The Alberta Liberal Party finished fourth in the overall popular vote, with its vote share falling by more than three quarters. They were shut out of the legislature for the first time since 1982. Liberal Leader David Khan placed fourth in his constituency, which was formerly represented by his retiring predecessor David Swann.

A number of minor parties, including several running to the right of the UCP, contested the election, but none came close to winning any seats. The Alberta Independence Party (which fielded the most candidates after the UCP, NDP and AP) finished fifth in the overall popular vote. The Freedom Conservative Party finished sixth, although they ran fewer candidates compared to the other parties. On average, FCP candidates polled the most votes outside the three largest parties. The FCP's only incumbent (party founder and leader Derek Fildebrandt), who had been originally elected as a representative for the now defunct Wildrose Party, finished a distant third in his own riding. The Green Party of Alberta finished seventh in the overall popular vote and the Alberta Advantage Party finished eighth.

The last time only two parties took all of the seats was in 1993, and the only time before that was in 1913 after the defeat of Socialist Party MLA Charles O'Brien and before the rise of farmer and labour parties. Incumbent Independent MLA Rick Strankman – previously a UCP MLA – finished second place in his riding.

This was the first provincial election in which eligible voters could cast ballots at any advance poll in the province, not just at stations in a person's riding. The program was called "Vote Anywhere" by Elections Alberta.

Notley's 24-member caucus was the largest Official Opposition caucus since the Liberals won 32 seats in 1993. The overall result for the NDP (both in total seats and share of the vote) was the second best in the party's history after its 2015 win.

Due to the non-proportional representation First Past the Post election system that is used in Alberta, in 2019 the NDP swept all but one of the Edmonton seats, while the UCP swept almost all the seats in Calgary and 39 of the 41 seats in rural Alberta. NDP MLAs were elected in 20 of the 21 Edmonton districts, 3 of the 26 Calgary districts and 2 of the 41 districts outside the major cities, the latter including suburban St. Albert.

=== Summary results ===

Party	Votes			Seats	
United Conservative	1,040,004	54.9%	▲2.9pp	63 / 87 (72%)	▲33
New Democratic	619,147	32.7%	▼7.9pp	24 / 87 (28%)	▼30
Alberta Party	171,996	9.1%	▲6.8pp	0 / 87 (0%)	▼1
Others and independents	63,838	3.4%	▼1.8pp	0 / 87 (0%)	▼1

Popular vote
United Conservative	54.88%
New Democratic	32.67%
Alberta Party	9.08%
Others	3.37%

Seats
United Conservative	72.41%
New Democratic	27.59%

Results of the Alberta Legislative election 2019
Party	Leader	Candidates	Seats				Popular vote		
Party	Leader	Candidates	2015	Dissol.	2019	+/-	Votes	%	+/- (pp)
United Conservative	Jason Kenney	87	—N/a (Note: The United Conservative Party was founded in 2017 by a merger of the Progressive Conservative and Wildrose parties. Together, these two parties won 30 seats in the 2015 election.)	25	63	+33	1,040,563	54.88%	+2.87
New Democratic	Rachel Notley	87	54	52	24	−30	619,921	32.67%	−7.95
Alberta Party	Stephen Mandel	87	1	3	–	−1	172,203	9.08%	+6.84
Liberal	David Khan	51	1	1	–	−1	18,544	0.98%	−3.20
Alberta Independence	Dave Bjorkman	63	—N/a	–	–	–	13,531	0.71%	New
Freedom Conservative	Derek Fildebrandt	24	– (Note: As the Alberta First Party.)	1	–	–	9,945	0.52%	+0.52
Independent		25	–	3	–	–	7,740	0.41%	+0.01
Green	Cheryle Chagnon-Greyeyes	32	–	–	–	–	7,682	0.41%	−0.08
Alberta Advantage	Marilyn Burns	28	—N/a	–	–	–	5,618	0.30%	New
Communist	Naomi Rankin	4	–	–	–	–	302	0.02%	0.00
Progressive Conservative (Note: The Progressive Conservative and Wildrose parties merged in 2017 to form the United Conservative Party. Both predecessor parties remain officially registered, sharing a leadership team with the UCP. In order to maintain registration, each fielded a single candidate in the 2019 election.)	Jason Kenney (Note: Kenney's only public presence is as leader of the United Conservative Party.)	1	9	1	–	−1	297	0.02%	—N/a (Note: The Progressive Conservative and Wildrose parties only ran candidates to maintain official registration.)
Reform	Randy Thorsteinson	1	—N/a	–	–	–	79	0.00%	New
Pro-Life	Murray Ruhl	1	– (Note: As the Alberta Social Credit Party.)	–	–	–	60	0.00%	−0.05
Wildrose	Jason Kenney	1	21	–	–	–	57	0.00%	—N/a
Vacant			1 (Note: Progressive Conservative candidate Jim Prentice disclaimed his victory in Calgary-Foothills. No member was elected from this riding.)	1	—N/a				
Blank, rejected and invalid votes							9,824	–	–
Total		492	87	87	87	–	1,906,366	100.00%	–
Registered voters/Turnout							2,824,309	67.50%	–

=== Synopsis of results ===
2019 Alberta general election - synopsis of riding results
Riding (Note: initially sorted by electoral district number)	2015 (Redist)	Winning party					Turnout (Note: including spoilt ballots)	Votes (Note: minor political parties receiving less than 1% of the popular vote in 2019 or 2015, or otherwise fielding candidates in less than half the ridings in 2019, are aggregated under "Other"; independent candidates are aggregated separately)							
Riding	2015 (Redist)	Party	Votes	Share	Margin #	Margin %	Turnout	UCP	NDP	AP	Lib	AIP	Ind	Other	Total
Calgary-Acadia	NDP	UCP	12,615	54.3%	4,566	19.7%	67.5%	12,615	8,049	1,728	350	245	–	243	23,230
Calgary-Beddington	NDP	UCP	11,625	53.4%	3,807	17.5%	63.0%	11,625	7,818	1,799	370	161	117	–	21,773
Calgary-Bow	NDP	UCP	13,987	55.9%	5,439	21.7%	67.9%	13,987	8,548	1,774	320	–	–	394	25,023
Calgary-Buffalo	NDP	NDP	11,292	48.9%	2,242	9.7%	60.6%	9,050	11,292	1,597	590	147	–	436	23,112
Calgary-Cross	NDP	UCP	8,907	54.3%	2,772	16.9%	53.5%	8,907	6,135	962	410	–	–	–	16,414
Calgary-Currie	NDP	UCP	9,960	43.7%	191	0.8%	66.0%	9,960	9,769	2,512	491	–	–	60	22,792
Calgary-East	NDP	UCP	7,520	49.7%	2,653	17.5%	47.7%	7,520	4,867	1,879	439	–	–	420	15,125
Calgary-Edgemont	PC	UCP	13,308	52.8%	4,738	18.8%	69.9%	13,308	8,570	2,740	305	106	–	155	25,184
Calgary-Elbow	AP	UCP	10,951	44.3%	3,409	13.8%	71.7%	10,951	5,796	7,542	275	–	–	132	24,696
Calgary-Falconridge (Note: also an open seat)	NDP	UCP	6,753	45.6%	91	0.7 %	51.7%	6,753	6,662	849	561	–	–	–	14,825
Calgary-Fish Creek	PC	UCP	15,975	61.5%	8,499	32.7%	72.0%	15,975	7,476	1,699	359	226	–	231	25,966
Calgary-Foothills	PC	UCP	12,277	57.0%	5,292	24.6%	66.1%	12,277	6,985	1,680	379	80	–	142	21,543
Calgary-Glenmore	NDP	UCP	14,565	55.6%	6,186	23.6%	71.6%	14,565	8,379	2,217	424	123	–	470	26,178
Calgary-Hays	PC	UCP	14,186	63.2%	8,480	37.8%	66.0%	14,186	5,706	2,052	293	211	–	–	22,448
Calgary-Klein	NDP	UCP	10,473	47.6%	1,697	7.7%	64.4%	10,473	8,776	1,842	396	214	–	294	21,995
Calgary-Lougheed	PC	UCP	11,633	65.9%	7,299	41.3%	65.9%	11,633	4,334	1,365	219	101	55	–	17,652
Calgary-McCall	NDP	NDP	6,567	51.7%	1,716	13.5%	55.9%	4,851	6,567	636	281	84	–	278	12,697
Calgary-Mountain View	Lib	NDP	12,526	47.3%	2,818	10.6%	69.6%	9,708	12,526	2,345	1,474	102	–	315	26,470
Calgary-North	NDP	UCP	8,409	55.2%	3,678	24.1%	61.7%	8,409	4,731	1,591	365	128	–	–	15,224
Calgary-North East	NDP	UCP	8,376	49.3%	2,330	13.7%	62.3%	8,376	6,046	1,791	761	–	–	–	16,374
Calgary-North West	PC	UCP	13,565	56.8%	5,954	24.9%	71.8%	13,565	7,611	2,171	258	–	69	262	23,867
Calgary-Peigan	NDP	UCP	13,353	59.8%	6,826	30.6%	66.3%	13,353	6,527	1,534	425	180	–	299	22,318
Calgary-Shaw	NDP	UCP	14,261	65.3%	8,667	39.7%	68.2%	14,261	5,594	1,331	290	146	–	212	21,834
Calgary-South East	PC	UCP	12,860	61.2%	8,877	42.2%	71.2%	12,860	3,983	3,810	224	134	–	–	21,011
Calgary-Varsity	NDP	UCP	10,853	46.2%	638	2.8%	73.2%	10,853	10,215	1,687	383	101	–	274	23,513
Calgary-West	PC	UCP	14,978	66.1%	9,209	40.6%	69.8%	14,978	5,769	1,595	300	–	–	–	22,651
Edmonton-Beverly-Clareview	NDP	NDP	8,834	50.9%	2,526	14.6%	56.1%	6,308	8,834	1,283	494	240	84	206	17,365
Edmonton-Castle Downs	NDP	NDP	9,445	45.7%	2,017	9.8%	65.1%	7,428	9,445	3,213	291	294	–	–	20,671
Edmonton-City Centre	NDP	NDP	13,598	66.3%	9,113	44.4%	59.4%	4,485	13,598	1,907	–	169	95	342	20,501
Edmonton-Decore	NDP	NDP	8,789	47.5%	1,418	7.6%	56.4%	7,371	8,789	2,027	–	301	–	–	18,488
Edmonton-Ellerslie	NDP	NDP	9,717	50.9%	2,487	13.0%	65.4%	7,230	9,717	1,273	390	199	–	263	19,072
Edmonton-Glenora	NDP	NDP	11,573	58.7%	5,702	28.9%	61.3%	5,871	11,573	1,985	–	298	–	–	19,727
Edmonton-Gold Bar	NDP	NDP	14,562	59.5%	7,388	30.2%	69.0%	7,174	14,562	2,008	315	176	–	247	24,482
Edmonton-Highlands-Norwood	NDP	NDP	9,998	63.4%	5,983	37.9%	51.8%	4,015	9,998	1,057	–	226	–	462	15,758
Edmonton-Manning	NDP	NDP	9,782	50.1%	2,314	11.9%	59.7%	7,468	9,782	1,692	–	176	–	416	19,534
Edmonton-McClung	NDP	NDP	8,073	43.6%	1,433	7.7%	64.3%	6,640	8,073	3,601	–	–	–	188	18,502
Edmonton-Meadows	NDP	NDP	10,231	49.9%	2,856	13.9%	65.3%	7,375	10,231	2,093	407	178	–	211	20,495
Edmonton-Mill Woods	NDP	NDP	10,461	50.0%	2,453	11.7%	65.0%	8,008	10,461	1,560	572	254	–	69	20,924
Edmonton-North West	NDP	NDP	9,669	51.7%	3,082	16.5%	61.3%	6,587	9,669	1,871	276	149	–	136	18,688
Edmonton-Riverview	NDP	NDP	12,234	56.3%	5,726	26.4%	70.6%	6,508	12,234	2,503	299	190	135	–	21,734
Edmonton-Rutherford	NDP	NDP	12,154	54.8%	4,417	19.9%	69.3%	7,737	12,154	1,600	375	117	–	191	22,174
Edmonton-South	NDP	NDP	10,673	46.6%	792	3.4%	70.7%	9,881	10,673	2,156	–	–	–	180	22,890
Edmonton-South West	NDP	UCP	10,254	45.0%	715	3.2%	70.0%	10,254	9,539	2,668	–	–	–	333	22,794
Edmonton-Strathcona	NDP	NDP	14,724	72.3%	11,243	55.2%	64.8%	3,481	14,724	1,139	239	86	49	704	20,373
Edmonton-West Henday	NDP	NDP	8,820	44.1%	518	2.6%	65.8%	8,302	8,820	2,337	311	239	–	–	20,009
Edmonton-Whitemud	NDP	NDP	11,373	49.2%	2,253	9.8%	70.7%	9,120	11,373	2,335	–	–	–	297	23,125
Airdrie-Cochrane	WR	UCP	18,777	66.0%	11,594	40.8%	74.0%	18,777	7,183	1,818	–	345	–	331	28,454
Airdrie-East	WR	UCP	16,764	67.6%	11,834	47.6%	70.2%	16,764	4,960	2,371	–	213	112	482	24,790
Athabasca-Barrhead-Westlock	WR	UCP	16,822	69.3%	12,036	49.6%	72.4%	16,822	4,786	2,232	–	442	273	–	24,282
Banff-Kananaskis	NDP	UCP	10,859	51.5%	1,969	9.3%	68.7%	10,859	8,890	941	228	154	80	–	21,072
Bonnyville-Cold Lake-St. Paul	WR	UCP	15,943	73.6%	12,882	59.5%	65.9%	15,943	3,061	2,223	–	217	162	207	21,651
Brooks-Medicine Hat	WR	UCP	13,606	69.2%	9,594	48.8%	65.6%	13,606	4,012	1,554	281	218	2,759	–	19,671
Camrose	PC	UCP	15,587	65.6%	11,200	47.1%	74.6%	15,587	4,387	3,059	–	158	126	560	23,751
Cardston-Siksika	WR	UCP	11,980	77.0%	9,374	60.3%	65.1%	11,980	2,606	589	173	–	727	214	15,562
Central Peace-Notley	WR	UCP	10,680	75.2%	7,910	55.7%	72.3%	10,680	2,770	651	106	–	–	–	14,207
Chestermere-Strathmore	WR	UCP	15,612	68.8%	12,054	53.1%	67.0%	15,612	3,558	1,460	238	136	112	1,683	22,687
Cypress-Medicine Hat	WR	UCP	16,483	67.1%	10,087	41.1%	67.4%	16,483	6,396	1,122	219	–	–	359	24,579
Drayton Valley-Devon	WR	UCP	18,092	71.4%	13,859	54.7%	74.0%	18,092	4,233	1,634	217	233	106	922	25,331
Drumheller-Stettler	WR	UCP	16,958	83.7%	15,117	74.6%	74.7%	16,958	1,446	1,461	–	230	1,841	176	20,271
Fort McMurray-Lac La Biche	WR	UCP	9,836	66.3%	6,201	41.8%	58.2%	9,836	3,635	857	–	271	–	230	14,829
Fort McMurray-Wood Buffalo	WR	UCP	10,269	71.1%	7,140	49.4%	64.5%	10,269	3,129	804	–	249	–	–	14,451
Fort Saskatchewan-Vegreville	NDP	UCP	14,233	53.6%	6,443	24.2%	70.2%	14,233	7,790	3,386	–	261	–	869	26,539
Grande Prairie	NDP	UCP	12,713	63.2%	8,352	41.5%	63.9%	12,713	4,361	2,516	–	126	66	392	20,108
Grande Prairie-Wapiti	PC	UCP	17,772	75.6%	14,249	60.6%	70.7%	17,772	3,523	2,277	–	–	222	–	23,522
Highwood	WR	UCP	18,635	73.3%	14,182	55.8%	72.4%	18,635	4,453	1,988	–	362	–	–	25,438
Innisfail-Sylvan Lake	WR	UCP	19,030	74.9%	15,577	61.3%	73.3%	19,030	3,453	2,337	–	–	106	602	25,422
Lac Ste. Anne-Parkland	NDP	UCP	15,860	65.7%	10,214	42.3%	72.3%	15,860	5,646	1,870	–	413	–	337	24,126
Lacombe-Ponoka	WR	UCP	17,379	71.3%	13,740	56.4%	74.8%	17,379	3,639	2,520	–	279	–	555	24,372
Leduc-Beaumont	NDP	UCP	14,982	58.6%	7,731	30.3%	72.4%	14,982	7,251	2,206	212	165	71	765	25,581
Lesser Slave Lake	NDP	UCP	5,873	57.7%	2,197	21.6%	63.1%	5,873	3,676	381	–	251	–	–	10,181
Lethbridge-East	NDP	UCP	11,883	52.4%	3,108	13.7%	66.8%	11,883	8,775	1,054	512	453	–	–	22,677
Lethbridge-West	NDP	NDP	11,016	45.2%	226	0.9%	68.7%	10,790	11,016	1,763	460	332	–	–	24,361
Livingstone-Macleod	WR	UCP	17,644	70.6%	12,519	50.1%	69.5%	17,644	5,125	1,276	258	430	–	244	24,977
Maskwacis-Wetaskiwin	NDP	UCP	12,796	64.1%	8,059	40.4%	69.1%	12,796	4,737	1,382	–	–	–	1,041	19,956
Morinville-St. Albert	NDP	UCP	13,435	50.0%	4,527	16.8%	72.8%	13,435	8,908	3,963	–	204	–	355	26,865
Olds-Didsbury-Three Hills	WR	UCP	20,516	78.6%	17,446	66.8%	72.0%	20,516	3,070	1,779	–	–	–	752	26,117
Peace River	NDP	UCP	9,770	69.4%	6,631	47.1%	60.4%	9,770	3,139	721	198	–	–	249	14,077
Red Deer-North	NDP	UCP	12,739	60.6%	7,866	37.4%	66.0%	12,739	4,873	2,769	–	248	–	389	21,018
Red Deer-South	NDP	UCP	16,159	60.3%	9,315	34.8%	71.9%	16,159	6,844	3,244	–	–	–	545	26,792
Rimbey-Rocky Mountain House-Sundre	WR	UCP	20,579	81.8%	18,286	72.7%	75.2%	20,579	2,293	1,350	–	185	50	750	25,157
Sherwood Park	NDP	UCP	12,119	45.4%	1,434	5.4%	76.6%	12,119	10,685	3,509	–	216	–	183	26,712
Spruce Grove-Stony Plain	NDP	UCP	15,843	59.4%	8,007	30.0%	71.7%	15,843	7,836	2,597	–	417	–	–	26,693
St. Albert	NDP	NDP	12,336	46.2%	1,654	6.2%	72.7%	10,682	12,336	2,817	317	172	–	368	26,692
Strathcona-Sherwood Park	NDP	UCP	14,151	52.6%	5,456	20.3%	76.4%	14,151	8,695	3,605	–	141	67	289	26,881
Taber-Warner	WR	UCP	14,321	78.1%	11,958	65.2%	65.1%	14,321	2,363	1,443	205	–	–	–	18,332
Vermilion-Lloydminster-Wainwright	PC	UCP	19,768	79.3%	17,278	69.3%	79.8%	19,768	2,490	1,615	–	–	133	1,068	24,941
West Yellowhead	NDP	UCP	16,381	68.7%	11,469	48.1%	67.8%	16,381	4,912	2,073	–	229	123	261	23,856

= results as certified in a judicial recount
= open seat
= incumbents switched allegiance after 2015 election
= UCP candidate stripped of nomination

=== Detailed analysis ===
Party rankings (1st to 5th place)
Party	1st	2nd	3rd	4th	5th
United Conservative	63	24	–	–	–
New Democratic	24	61	1	1	–
Alberta Party	–	1	83	3	–
Independent		1	2	1	1
Freedom Conservative	–	–	1	16	5
Liberal	–	–	–	40	8
Alberta Independence	–	–	–	15	22
Alberta Advantage	–	–	–	7	11
Green	–	–	–	3	23
Progressive Conservative	–	–	–	1	–
Pro-Life	–	–	–	–	1

Party candidates in 2nd place
Party in 1st place	Party in 2nd place				Total
Party in 1st place	UC	NDP	AP	Ind	Total
United Conservative	–	61	1	1	63
New Democratic	24	–	–	–	24
Total	24	61	1	1	87

Principal races, according to 1st and 2nd-place results
Parties		Seats
█ United Conservative	█ New Democratic	85
█ United Conservative	█ Alberta Party	1
█ United Conservative	█ Independent	1
Total		87

Elections to the 30th Legislative Assembly of Alberta – seats won/lost by party, 2015–2019
Party	2015	Merger	Gain from (loss to)								2019
Party	2015	Merger	UCP		NDP		AP		Lib		2019
United Conservative	–	31			31		1				63
New Democratic	54			(31)					1		24
Wildrose	21	(21)									–
Progressive Conservative	10	(10)									–
Alberta Party	1			(1)							–
Liberal	1					(1)					–
Total	87	–	–	(32)	31	(1)	1	–	1	–	87

Resulting composition of the 30th Legislative Assembly of Alberta
Source		Party		
Source		UCP	NDP	Total
Seats retained	Incumbents returned	19	21	40
Seats retained	Open seats held	10	2	12
Seats retained	Ouster of incumbents changing affiliation	2		2
Seats changing hands	Incumbents defeated	24		24
Seats changing hands	Open seats gained	8	1	9
Total		63	24	87

=== Significant results among independent and minor party candidates ===
Those candidates not belonging to a major party, receiving more than 1,000 votes in the election, are listed below:

Riding	Party	Candidates	Votes	Placed
Brooks-Medicine Hat	█ Independent	Todd Beasley	2,759	3rd
Chestermere-Strathmore	█ Freedom Cons.	Derek Fildebrandt	1,683	3rd
Drumheller-Stettler	█ Independent	Rick Strankman	1,841	2nd

=== Results by region ===
Party		Calgary (Note: The Calgary region includes only ridings inside the city (i.e., ridings starting with "Calgary").)	Edmonton (Note: The Edmonton region includes only ridings inside the city (i.e., ridings starting with "Edmonton").)	North	Central (Note: The central region includes the 12 "Central" districts plus 7 Edmonton suburban districts, making a total of 19.)	South (Note: The south region includes the seven "South" districts plus six Calgary suburban districts, making a total of 13.)	Total
United Conservative	Seats:	23	1	9	19	11	63
United Conservative	Popular vote, %:	53.2	34.6	69.4	63.5	64.2	54.9
New Democratic	Seats:	3	19	0	1	1	24
New Democratic	Popular vote, %:	34.0	52.6	20.3	23.1	25.1	32.7
Total seats		26	20	9	20	12	87
Parties that won no seats:
Alberta Party	Popular vote, %:	9.5	9.9	8.0	9.8	6.3	9.1
Liberal	Popular vote, %:	2.0	1.0	0.2	0.1	0.9	1.0
Alberta Independence	Popular vote, %:	0.4	0.8	1.0	0.7	1.0	0.7
Freedom Conservative	Popular vote, %:	0.2	0.1	0.4	1.1	1.0	0.5
Independent	Popular vote, %:	0.0	0.1	0.5	0.5	1.4	0.4
Green	Popular vote, %:	0.6	0.5	0.1	0.4	0.1	0.4
Alberta Advantage	Popular vote, %:	0.0	0.3	0.1	0.7	0.1	0.3
Communist	Popular vote, %:	0.0	0.1	—N/a	—N/a	—N/a	0.0
Progressive Conservative (Note: The Progressive Conservative and Wildrose parties merged in 2017 to form the United Conservative Party. Both predecessor parties remain officially registered, sharing a leadership team with the UCP. In order to maintain registration, each fielded a single candidate in the 2019 election.)	Popular vote, %:	—N/a	0.1	—N/a	—N/a	—N/a	0.0
Reform	Popular vote, %:	—N/a	—N/a	—N/a	0.0	—N/a	0.0
Pro-Life	Popular vote, %:	0.0	—N/a	—N/a	—N/a	—N/a	0.0
Wildrose	Popular vote, %:	—N/a	0.0	—N/a	—N/a	—N/a	0.0
Turnout, %		62.9	60.6	63.4	68.5	64.1	64.0

=== Campaign finance ===
For the 2019 Alberta general election all parities cumulatively raised a total of $7.9 million and spent $11.3 million. At the constituency level, Calgary-Mountain View had the highest expenses at a total of $212,354, including four candidates which exceed $40,000. Of the 38 candidates which exceeded $45,000 in expenses, 21 were elected. Third party advertisers raised a total of $2.1 million and spent $1.9 million during the election. Unions contributed 46 per cent of the revenue for third party advertisers, corporations contributed 39 per cent, and individuals contributed 15 per cent.

2019 Alberta general election Campaign Expenses
Party	Leader	Candidates	Revenue	Expenses	Surplus (Deficit)
United Conservative	Jason Kenney	87	$3,888,776	$5,512,035	$(1,620,166)
New Democratic	Rachel Notley	87	$3,703,786	$5,411,903	$(1,708,117)
Alberta Party	Stephen Mandel	87	$206,597	$199,935	$6,662
Liberal	David Khan	51	$101,104	$129,563	$(28,459)
Freedom Conservative	Derek Fildebrandt	24	$17,234	$46,050	$(28,816)
Green	Cheryle Chagnon-Greyeyes	32	$14,895	$41,702	$(26,807)
Alberta Advantage	Marilyn Burns	28	$7,563	$15,176	$(7,613)
Alberta Independence	Dave Bjorkman	63	$0	$0	$0
Communist	Naomi Rankin	4	$0	$98	$(98)
Pro-Life	Murray Ruhl	1	$0	$0	$0
Progressive Conservative	Jason Kenney	1	$0	$0	$0
Reform	Randy Thorsteinson	1	$0	$450	$(450)
Wildrose	Jason Kenney	1	$0	$0	$0
Total			$7,939,955	$11,356,912	$(3,413,864)
Source: Elections Alberta

== Timeline ==
=== 2015 ===
- May 5: The Alberta New Democratic Party (NDP) wins a majority government in the 29th Alberta General Election, defeating the long-ruling Progressive Conservative Association of Alberta (PCs) after close to 44 years in office. The Wildrose Party remains the official opposition, with the PCs dropping to third and the Alberta Liberal Party and Alberta Party winning one seat each. Outgoing Premier Jim Prentice announces his resignation as PC leader, and disclaims his victory in Calgary-Foothills, leaving the riding vacant and triggering a by-election.
- May 11: Ric McIver, PC MLA-elect for Calgary-Hays and outgoing cabinet minister, is appointed interim leader of the PCs.
- May 15: Elections Alberta publishes the official election results.
- May 22: Deborah Drever, NDP MLA-elect for Calgary-Bow, is suspended from the NDP caucus for controversial social media posts.
- May 24: Rachel Notley, NDP MLA-elect for Edmonton-Strathcona, is sworn in as Alberta's 17th Premier, along with her 11-member Cabinet.
- June 1: The new MLAs are sworn in.
- June 11: The first session of the 29th Alberta Legislative Assembly begins.
- August 6: Premier Notley calls a by-election for Calgary-Foothills, vacated by Jim Prentice's disclamation of victory, with the vote to be held on September 3.
- September 3: The Calgary-Foothills by-election is held. Wildrose candidate Prasad Panda is elected.
- November 23: Manmeet Bhullar, PC MLA for Calgary-Greenway, dies in a highway crash, triggering a by-election in his riding.

=== 2016 ===
- January 8: Deborah Drever, Independent MLA for Calgary-Bow, rejoins the NDP.
- February 23: Premier Notley calls a by-election for Calgary-Greenway, vacated by Manmeet Bhullar's death, with the vote to be held on March 22.
- March 22: The Calgary-Greenway by-election is held. PC candidate Prabhdeep Gill is elected.
- May 27: Derek Fildebrandt, Wildrose MLA for Strathmore-Brooks, is suspended from caucus for controversies over a social media post regarding Ontario Premier Kathleen Wynne.
- May 31: Derek Fildebrandt, MLA for Strathmore-Brooks, has suspension lifted by the Wildrose Party after promising to follow set conditions.
- November 17: Sandra Jansen, PC MLA for Calgary-North West, joins the NDP after allegations of harassment during the PC leadership race.

=== 2017 ===
- March 18: Jason Kenney, former federal cabinet minister, is elected PC leader on a platform of joining with the Wildrose to form a united right-of-centre party.
- May 18: PC leader Jason Kenney and Wildrose leader Brian Jean announce that merger referendums will be held in their parties on July 22, 2017. If they pass, with thresholds of 50%+1 of PC members and 75% of Wildrose members, the parties will begin the process of merging into the United Conservative Party, or UCP.
- May 25: The Alberta Electoral Boundaries Commission presents its interim report, proposing changes to the boundaries and names of the province's ridings for the next election.
- June 4: David Khan is elected leader of the Liberal Party, becoming the first openly gay leader of a major Alberta political party. David Swann, MLA for Calgary-Mountain View, had been serving as interim leader since the resignation of Raj Sherman in January 2015.
- July 22: The PC and Wildrose parties hold unity referendums on the question of merging into the United Conservative Party. Both parties approve the merger with 95% support.
- July 24: The UCP legislative caucus meets for the first time and appoints Nathan Cooper, Wildrose MLA for Olds-Didsbury-Three Hills, as interim leader. Richard Starke, PC MLA for Vermilion-Lloydminster, announces that he will not join the UCP caucus, and will continue sitting as a PC until the party is formally deregistered. This did not occur prior to dissolution of the House, thus, Starke never officially became an independent MLA.
- July 25: The UCP caucus is formally established in the legislature, comprising all 22 Wildrose MLAs and 7 of the 8 PC MLAs. Richard Starke continues to sit as a PC MLA.
- July 27: The UCP is formally registered with Elections Alberta. The PC and Wildrose parties remain registered, but both share the UCP's leadership team.
- August 15: Derek Fildebrandt, UCP MLA for Strathmore-Brooks, resigns from the UCP caucus following an expense scandal, becoming an independent.
- September 21: Rick Fraser, UCP MLA for Calgary-South East, resigns from the UCP caucus, becoming an independent.
- October 4: Karen McPherson, NDP MLA for Calgary-Mackay-Nose Hill, resigns from the NDP caucus, becoming an independent.
- October 19: The Alberta Electoral Boundaries Commission releases its final report finalizing names and boundary changes that will take effect for the next provincial election.
- October 28: Jason Kenney is elected leader of the United Conservative Party.
- October 30: Karen McPherson, Independent MLA for Calgary-Mackay-Nose Hill, joins the Alberta Party caucus.
- November 1: Dave Rodney, UCP MLA for Calgary-Lougheed, resigns as MLA, triggering a by-election in his riding. Rodney stepped down in order to allow Kenney a chance to enter the legislature.
- November 16: Premier Notley calls a by-election for Calgary-Lougheed, vacated by Dave Rodney's resignation, with the vote to be held on December 14.
- November 18: Greg Clark resigns as leader of the Alberta Party, triggering a leadership election for the party. Clark assumes the role of interim leader until the leadership election.
- December 14: The Calgary-Lougheed by-election is held. UCP candidate and leader Jason Kenney is elected.

=== 2018 ===
- January 9: Rick Fraser, Independent MLA for Calgary-South East, joins the Alberta Party caucus.
- February 2: Don MacIntyre, UCP MLA for Innisfail-Sylvan Lake, resigns from the UCP caucus, becoming an independent.
- February 5: Don MacIntyre, Independent MLA for Innisfail-Sylvan Lake, resigns as MLA, triggering a by-election in his riding. MacIntyre stepped down following sexual assault and sexual interference charges.
- February 27: Stephen Mandel is elected leader of the Alberta Party.
- March 5: Brian Jean, UCP MLA for Fort McMurray-Conklin, resigns as MLA, triggering a by-election in his riding.
- June 14: Premier Notley calls by-elections for Innisfail-Sylvan Lake and Fort McMurray-Conklin, vacated by Don MacIntyre and Brian Jean's respective resignations, with the vote to be held on July 12.
- July 12: In by-elections, Laila Goodridge is elected in Fort McMurray-Conklin and Devin Dreeshen is elected in Innisfail-Sylvan Lake. Both seats were retained by the UCP.
- July 14: Prab Gill, UCP MLA for Calgary-Greenway, resigns from the UCP caucus, becoming an independent.
- July 20: Derek Fildebrandt, Independent MLA for Strathmore-Brooks, joins the Freedom Conservative Party of Alberta and is appointed interim leader until the leadership election.
- October 20: Derek Fildebrandt is acclaimed leader of the Freedom Conservative Party of Alberta.
- November 5: Robyn Luff, NDP MLA for Calgary-East, is withdrawn as the party's nominee for the district and is removed from the NDP caucus, becoming an independent.

=== 2019 ===
- January 2: Stephanie McLean, NDP MLA for Calgary-Varsity, resigns her seat. As a spring general election is anticipated, no by-election is called in this riding.
- January 15: Rick Strankman, UCP MLA for Drumheller-Stettler, resigns from the UCP caucus, becoming an independent. Strankman claimed "hyper partisan self-centered politics" and the lack of grassroots voting within the party as his reason for leaving the caucus.
- February 9: Alberta Party leader Stephen Mandel is declared ineligible to run by Elections Alberta because of late paperwork submission.
- March 4: The ruling on Stephen Mandel's eligibility to run is reversed.
- March 19: Premier Notley announced that the election would take place on April 16.
- April 4: Televised Leader's Debate.
- April 13: Advanced Polling ends with Elections Alberta estimation of a record 696,000 votes cast.

== Opinion polling ==
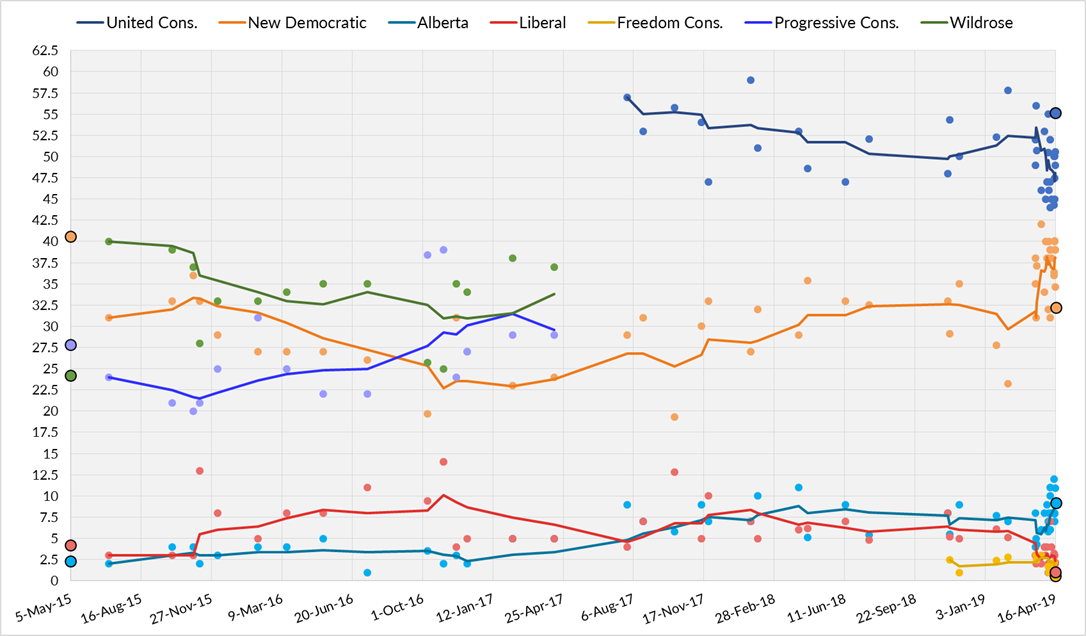

The following is a list of scientific opinion polls of published voter intentions.

Last Date of Polling	Polling organisation	Sample size	NDP	UCP	Liberal	Alberta	Freedom Conservative	Lead
April 16, 2019	General Election	1,894,985	32.7%	54.9%	1.0%	9.1%	0.5%	22.2%
April 15, 2019	Forum Research	1,140	34.6%	50.6%	2.2%	10.9%		16%
April 15, 2019	Research Co.	602	39%	49%	2%	9%		10%
April 14, 2019	Mainstreet Research	1,288	40.1%	47.5%	2.1%	7.9%	1.1%	7.4%
14 April 2019	Pollara Insights	1,005	39%	45%	3%	8%	1%	6%
14 April 2019	Ipsos	1,202	40%	50%	1%	7%		10%
13 April 2019	Nanos Research	500	36.4%	44.3%	3.2%	12.0%	2.2%	7.9%
13 April 2019	Leger	1,505	36%	50%	3%	8%		14%
10 April 2019	Pollara Insights	1,005	38%	45%	4%	8%	2%	7%
8 April 2019	Angus Reid	807	39%	52%	1%	6%		13%
8 April 2019	Ipsos	800	39%	47%	2%	10%		8%
8 April 2019	Innovative Research	506	31%	44%	7%	11%		13%
6 April 2019	ThinkHQ	1,139	40%	46%	2%	8%	1%	6%
5 April 2019	Mainstreet Research	876	38%	50.5%	2%	5.8%	1.7%	12.5%
5 April 2019	Forum Research	1,132	32%	55%	1%	7%		23%
4 April 2019	Televised leaders' debate							
3 April 2019	Leger	1,003	38%	47%	4%	9%		9%
1 April 2019	Research Co.	600	40%	45%	3%	6%		5%
30 March 2019	Janet Brown Opinion Research	900	34%	53%	4%	8%		19%
26 March 2019	EKOS	1,015	42%	46%	2%	6%	3%	4%
19 March 2019	Dissolution of the 29th Alberta Legislative Assembly, campaign begins							
19 March 2019	Mainstreet Research	1,160	37.1%	50.7%	2.8%	4.3%	2.5%	13.6%
18 March 2019	Angus Reid	812	31%	56%	2%	5%	3%	25%
17 March 2019	Ipsos	900	35%	52%	5%	6%		17%
17 March 2019	ThinkHQ	1,196	38%	49%	3%	8%		11%
12 March 2019	Leger	1,001	35%	47%	6%	9%		12%
25 February 2019	EKOS	1,028	37%	50%	3%	5%	3%	13%
5 February 2019	Lethbridge College	1,055	23.2%	57.8%	5.1%	7.0%	2.8%	34.6%
16 January 2019	Mainstreet Research	893	27.8%	52.3%	6.1%	7.7%	2.4%	24.5%
26 November 2018	ThinkHQ	1,102	35%	50%	5%	9%		15%
3 November 2018	Mainstreet Research	896	29.1%	54.3%	5.2%	5.5%	2.5%	24.9%
27 October 2018	Abacus Data	800	33%	48%	8%	8%		15%
4 October 2018	Lethbridge College	1,364	24.8%	48.6%	11.3%	8.4%		24.6%
17 July 2018	Mainstreet Research	936	32.5%	52.1%	4.8%	5.4%		19.6%
12 June 2018	Leger	999	33%	47%	7%	9%		14%
18 April 2018	Mainstreet Research	1,071	35.4%	48.6%	6.2%	5.1%		13.2%
5 April 2018	Trend Research / Janet Brown Opinion Research	1,200	29%	53%	6%	11%		24%
27 February 2018	Stephen Mandel becomes leader of the Alberta Party							
4 February 2018	ThinkHQ	1,185	32%	51%	5%	10%		19%
6 January 2018	Mainstreet Research	956	27.3%	55.9%	6.7%	7.0%		28.6%
24 November 2017	Insights West	701	33%	47%	10%	7%		14%
18 November 2017	Greg Clark resigns as leader of the Alberta Party, becoming interim leader							
13 November 2017	ThinkHQ	1,314	30%	54%	5%	9%		24%
28 October 2017	Jason Kenney becomes leader of the United Conservative Party							
5 October 2017	Lethbridge College	1,481	19.3%	55.8%	12.8%	5.8%		36.5%
20 August 2017	ThinkHQ	1,136	31%	53%	7%	7%		22%
28 July 2017	Mainstreet Research	2,100	29%	57%	4%	9%		28%
24 July 2017	Nathan Cooper is appointed interim leader of the United Conservative Party							
22 July 2017	The PC and Wildrose parties vote to merge in joint referendums, forming the United Conservative Party							

Last Date of Polling	Polling organisation	Sample size	NDP	Wildrose	PC	Liberal	Alberta	Lead
4 June 2017	David Khan becomes leader of the Liberal Party							
12 April 2017	Mainstreet Research	2,421	24%	37%	29%	5%	5%	8%
18 March 2017	Jason Kenney becomes leader of the Progressive Conservative Association							
10 February 2017	Mainstreet Research	2,589	23%	38%	29%	5%	5%	9%
5 December 2016	Insights West	701	27%	34%	27%	5%	2%	7%
20 November 2016	ThinkHQ	1,106	31%	35%	24%	4%	3%	4%
1 November 2016	Innovative Research	646	14%	25%	39%	14%	2%	14%
8 October 2016	Lethbridge College	1,513	19.7%	25.7%	38.4%	9.4%	3.5%	12.7%
12 July 2016	Insights West	601	26%	35%	22%	11%	1%	9%
9 May 2016	Insights West	713	27%	35%	22%	8%	5%	8%
16 March 2016	ThinkHQ	1,331	27%	34%	25%	8%	4%	7%
3 February 2016	Mainstreet Research	3,092	27%	33%	31%	5%	4%	2%
6 December 2015	ThinkHQ	1,230	29%	33%	25%	8%	3%	4%
10 November 2015	Insights West	619	33%	28%	21%	13%	2%	5%
1 November 2015	Mainstreet Research	3,199	36%	37%	20%	3%	4%	1%
1 October 2015	Mainstreet Research	3,258	33%	39%	21%	3%	4%	6%
30 June 2015	Mainstreet Research	3,007	31%	40%	24%	3%	2%	9%
11 May 2015	Ric McIver is appointed interim leader of the Progressive Conservative Association							
5 May 2015	Jim Prentice resigns as leader of the Progressive Conservative Association							
May 5, 2015	General election results	1,488,248	40.6%	24.2%	27.8%	4.2%	2.2%	12.8%

== Incumbent MLAs not seeking re-election ==
The following MLAs have announced that they would not run in the 2019 provincial election:

Retiring incumbent		Electoral District	Subsequent nominee	Elected MLA
Michael Connolly	New Democratic	Calgary-Hawkwood	Julia Hayter (Calgary-Edgemont)	Prasad Panda
Estefania Cortes-Vargas	New Democratic	Strathcona-Sherwood Park	Moira Váně	Nate Glubish
Scott Cyr	United Conservative	Bonnyville-Cold Lake	Dave Hanson (Bonnyville-Cold Lake-St. Paul)	Dave Hanson
Wayne Drysdale	United Conservative	Grande Prairie-Wapiti	Travis Toews	Travis Toews
Prab Gill	Independent	Calgary-Greenway	— (Calgary-Falconridge)	Devinder Toor
Sandra Jansen	New Democratic	Calgary-North West	Hafeez Chishti	Sonya Savage
Anam Kazim	New Democratic	Calgary-Glenmore	Jordan Stein	Whitney Issik
Jamie Kleinsteuber	New Democratic	Calgary-Northern Hills	Kelly Mandryk (Calgary-North)	Muhammad Yaseen
Robyn Luff	Independent	Calgary-East	—	Peter Singh
Brian Mason	New Democratic	Edmonton-Highlands-Norwood	Janis Irwin	Janis Irwin
Stephanie McLean (Note: McLean resigned her seat in early 2019, ahead of the general election, to resume her law career.)	New Democratic	Calgary-Varsity	Anne McGrath	Jason Copping
Karen McPherson	Alberta Party	Calgary-Mackay-Nose Hill	Carol-Lynn Darch (Calgary-Beddington)	Josephine Pon
Brandy Payne	New Democratic	Calgary-Acadia	Catherine Andrews-Hoult	Tyler Shandro
Colin Piquette	New Democratic	Athabasca-Sturgeon-Redwater	Theresa Taschuk (Athabasca-Barrhead-Westlock)	Glenn van Dijken
Dave Schneider	United Conservative	Little Bow	Joseph Schow (Cardston-Siksika)	Joseph Schow
Richard Starke	Progressive Conservative	Vermilion-Lloydminster	— (Vermilion-Lloydminster-Wainwright)	Garth Rowswell
Pat Stier	United Conservative	Livingstone-Macleod	Roger Reid	Roger Reid
David Swann	Liberal	Calgary-Mountain View	David Khan	Kathleen Ganley
Wes Taylor	United Conservative	Battle River-Wainwright	Jackie Lovely (Camrose)	Jackie Lovely
Bob Turner	New Democratic	Edmonton-Whitemud	Rakhi Pancholi	Rakhi Pancholi
Bob Wanner	New Democratic	Medicine Hat	Lynn MacWilliam (Brooks-Medicine Hat)	Michaela Glasgo

== Results by riding ==
The final list of candidates was published by Elections Alberta on March 29, 2019. The official results were published on May 14, 2019.

Party leaders are in bold. Candidate names appear as they appeared on the ballot.

† = Not seeking re-election
‡ = Running for re-election in different riding

=== Northern Alberta ===
Electoral district	Candidates					Incumbent
Electoral district	NDP	UCP	Liberal	Alberta Party	Other	Incumbent
Athabasca-Barrhead-Westlock	Therese Taschuk; 4,786 – 19.5%	Glenn van Dijken; 16,822 – 68.5%		Wayne Rufiange; 2,232 – 9.1%	Buster Malcolm (AIP); 442 – 1.8% Brad Giroux (Ind.); 273 – 1.1%	Glenn van Dijken; Barrhead-Morinville-Westlock
Athabasca-Barrhead-Westlock	Therese Taschuk; 4,786 – 19.5%	Glenn van Dijken; 16,822 – 68.5%		Wayne Rufiange; 2,232 – 9.1%	Buster Malcolm (AIP); 442 – 1.8% Brad Giroux (Ind.); 273 – 1.1%	Merged riding
Athabasca-Barrhead-Westlock	Therese Taschuk; 4,786 – 19.5%	Glenn van Dijken; 16,822 – 68.5%		Wayne Rufiange; 2,232 – 9.1%	Buster Malcolm (AIP); 442 – 1.8% Brad Giroux (Ind.); 273 – 1.1%	Colin Piquette †; Athabasca-Sturgeon-Redwater
Bonnyville-Cold Lake-St. Paul	Kari Whan; 3,061 – 14.0%	David Hanson; 15,943 – 73.1%		Glenn Andersen; 2,223 – 10.2%	David Garnett-Bennett (AIP); 217 – 1.0% David Inscho (AAP); 207 – 0.9% Kacey L. Daniels (Ind.); 162 – 0.7%	Scott Cyr †; Bonnyville-Cold Lake
Bonnyville-Cold Lake-St. Paul	Kari Whan; 3,061 – 14.0%	David Hanson; 15,943 – 73.1%		Glenn Andersen; 2,223 – 10.2%	David Garnett-Bennett (AIP); 217 – 1.0% David Inscho (AAP); 207 – 0.9% Kacey L. Daniels (Ind.); 162 – 0.7%	Merged riding
Bonnyville-Cold Lake-St. Paul	Kari Whan; 3,061 – 14.0%	David Hanson; 15,943 – 73.1%		Glenn Andersen; 2,223 – 10.2%	David Garnett-Bennett (AIP); 217 – 1.0% David Inscho (AAP); 207 – 0.9% Kacey L. Daniels (Ind.); 162 – 0.7%	David Hanson; Lac La Biche-St. Paul-Two Hills
Central Peace-Notley	Marg McCuaig-Boyd; 2,794 – 19.5%	Todd Loewen; 10,770 – 75.2%	Wayne F. Meyer; 108 – 0.8%	Travis McKim; 654 – 4.6%		Margaret McCuaig-Boyd; Dunvegan-Central Peace-Notley
Fort McMurray-Lac La Biche	Jane Stroud; 3,635 – 24.5%	Laila Goodridge; 9,836 – 66.3%		Jeff Fafard; 857 – 5.8%	Mark Grinder (AIP); 271 – 1.8% Brian Deheer (Gr.); 230 – 1.6%	Laila Goodridge; Fort McMurray-Conklin
Fort McMurray-Wood Buffalo	Stephen Drover; 3,129 – 21.7%	Tany Yao; 10,269 – 71.1%		Marcus Erlandson; 804 – 5.6%	Michael Keller (AIP); 249 – 1.7%	Tany Yao
Grande Prairie	Todd Russell; 4,361 – 21.6%	Tracy Allard; 12,713 – 63.0%		Grant Berg; 2,516 – 12.5%	Bernard Hancock (FCP); 392 – 1.9% Ray Robertson (AIP); 126 – 0.6% Rony Rajput (Ind.); 66 – 0.3%	Todd Loewen ‡ Grande Prairie-Smoky
Grande Prairie-Wapiti	Shannon Dunfield; 3,523 – 14.8%	Travis Toews; 17,772 – 74.8%		Jason Jones; 2,227 – 9.4%	Terry Dueck (Ind.); 222 – 0.9%	Wayne Drysdale †
Lesser Slave Lake	Danielle Larivee; 3,676 – 36.1%	Pat Rehn; 5,873 – 57.7%		Vincent Rain; 381 – 3.7%	Suzette Powder (AIP); 251 – 2.5%	Danielle Larivee
Peace River	Debbie Jabbour; 3,139 – 22.3%	Dan Williams; 9,770 – 69.4%	Remi J. Tardif; 198 – 1.4%	Dakota House; 721 – 5.1%	Connie Russell (FCP); 249 – 1.8%	Debbie Jabbour

=== Edmonton ===
27 Edmonton constituencies Six Central Edmonton constituencies Seven North Edmonton constituencies Seven South Edmonton constituencies Seven Suburban Edmonton constituencies

==== Central ====
Electoral district	Candidates					Incumbent
Electoral district	NDP	UCP	Liberal	Alberta Party	Other	Incumbent
Edmonton-City Centre	David Shepherd; 13,598 – 66.0%	Lily Le; 4,485 – 21.8%		Bob Philp; 1,907 – 9.3%	Chris Alders (Gr.); 342 – 1.7% John R. Morton (AIP); 169 – 0.8% Blake N. Dickson (Ind.); 95 – 0.5%	David Shepherd; Edmonton-Centre
Edmonton-Glenora	Sarah Hoffman; 11,573 – 58.7%	Marjorie Newman; 5,871 – 29.8%		Glen Tickner; 1,985 – 10.1%	Clint Kelley (AIP); 298 – 1.5%	Sarah Hoffman
Edmonton-Gold Bar	Marlin Schmidt; 14,562 – 59.5%	David Dorward; 7,174 – 29.3%	Steve Kochan; 315 – 1.3%	Diana Ly; 2,008 – 8.2%	Tanya Herbert (Gr.); 247 – 1.0% Vincent Loyer (AIP); 176 – 0.7%	Marlin Schmidt
Edmonton-Highlands-Norwood	Janis Irwin; 9,998 – 63.4%	Leila Houle; 4,015 – 25.5%		Tish Prouse; 1,057 – 6.7%	Taz Bouchier (Gr.); 243 – 1.5% Joe Hankins (AIP); 226 – 1.4% Chris Poplatek (AAP); 116 – 0.7% Alex S. Boykowich (Comm.); 103 – 0.7%	Brian Mason †
Edmonton-Riverview	Lori Sigurdson; 12,234 – 59.5%	Kara Barker; 6,508 – 29.8%	Indy Randhawa; 299 – 1.4%	Katherine O'Neill; 2,503 – 11.4%	Corey MacFadden (AIP); 190 – 0.9% Rob Bernshaw (Ind.); 135 – 0.6%	Lori Sigurdson
Edmonton-Strathcona	**Rachel Notley**; 14,724 – 72.1%	Kulshan Gill; 3,481 – 17.0%	Samantha Hees; 239 – 1.2%	Prem Pal; 1,139 – 5.6%	Gary Horan (PC); 295 – 1.5% Stuart Andrews (Gr.); 227 – 1.1% Ian Smythe (AIP); 86 – 0.4% Don Edward Meister (AAP); 62 – 0.3% **Naomi Rankin** (Comm.); 61 – 0.3% Dale Doan (WRP); 57 – 0.3% Gord McLean (Ind.); 49 – 0.2%	Rachel Notley

==== North ====
Electoral district	Candidates					Incumbent
Electoral district	NDP	UCP	Liberal	Alberta Party	Other	Incumbent
Edmonton-Beverly-Clareview	Deron Bilous; 8,834 – 50.6%	David Egan; 6,308 – 36.2%	Shadea Hussein; 494 – 2.8%	Jeff Walters; 1,283 – 7.4%	Paul A. Burts (AIP); 240 – 1.4% Michael Hunter (Gr.); 206 – 1.2% Andy Andrzej Gudanowski (Ind.); 84 – 0.5%	Deron Bilous
Edmonton-Castle Downs	Nicole Goehring; 9,445 – 45.7%	Ed Ammar; 7,428 – 35.9%	Thomas Deak; 291 – 1.4%	Moe Rahall; 3,213 – 15.5%	Todd Wayne (AIP); 294 – 1.4%	Nicole Goehring
Edmonton-Decore	Chris Nielsen; 8,789 – 47.5%	Karen Principe; 7,371 – 39.9%		Ali Haymour; 2,027 – 11.0%	Virginia Bruneau (AIP); 301 – 1.6%	Chris Nielsen
Edmonton-Manning	Heather Sweet; 9,782 – 50.1%	Harry Grewal; 7,468 – 38.2%		Manwar Khan; 1,692 – 8.7%	Adam Cory (AAP); 212 – 1.1% Chris Vallee (Gr.); 204 – 1.0% Terris Kolybaba (AIP); 176 – 0.9%	Heather Sweet
Edmonton-McClung	Lorne Dach; 8,073 – 43.6%	Laurie Mozeson; 6,640 – 35.9%		**Stephen Mandel**; 3,601 – 19.5%	Gordon Perrott (AAP); 188 – 1.0%	Lorne Dach
Edmonton-North West	David Eggen; 9,669 – 51.7%	Ali Eltayeb; 6,587 – 35.2%	Brandon Teixeira; 276 – 1.5%	Judy Kim-Meneen; 1,871 – 10.0%	Tim Shanks (AIP); 149 – 0.8% Luke Burns (AAP); 136 – 0.7%	David Eggen; Edmonton-Calder
Edmonton-West Henday	Jon Carson; 8,820 – 44.1%	Nicole Williams; 8,302 – 41.5%	Leah McRorie; 311 – 1.6%	Winston Leung; 2,337 – 11.7%	**Dave Bjorkman** (AIP); 239 – 1.2%	Jon Carson; Edmonton-Meadowlark

==== South ====
Electoral district	Candidates					Incumbent
Electoral district	NDP	UCP	Liberal	Alberta Party	Other	Incumbent
Edmonton-Ellerslie	Rod Loyola; 9,717 – 50.9%	Sanjay Patel; 7,230 – 37.9%	Mike McGowan; 390 – 2.0%	Hazelyn Williams; 1,273 – 6.7%	Yash Sharma (AAP); 263 – 1.4% Brian S. Lockyer (AIP); 199 – 1.0%	Rod Loyola
Edmonton-Meadows	Jasvir Deol; 10,231 – 49.9%	Len Rhodes; 7,375 – 36.0%	Maria Omar; 407 – 2.0%	Amrit Matharu; 2,093 – 10.2%	Thomas Varghese (AAP); 211 – 1.0% Phil Batt (AIP); 178 – 0.9%	Denise Woollard †; Edmonton-Mill Creek
Edmonton-Mill Woods	Christina Gray; 10,461 – 50.0%	Heather Sworin; 8,008 – 38.3%	Abdi Bakal; 572 – 2.7%	Anju Sharma; 1,560 – 7.5%	Dallas Price (AIP); 254 – 1.2% Andrew J. Janewski (Comm.); 69 – 0.3%	Christina Gray
Edmonton-Rutherford	Richard Feehan; 12,154 – 54.8%	Hannah Presakarchuk; 7,737 – 34.9%	Claire Wilde; 375 – 1.7%	Aisha Rauf; 1,600 – 7.2%	Valerie Kennedy (Gr.); 191 – 0.9% Lionel Levoir (AIP); 117 – 0.5%	Richard Feehan
Edmonton-South	Thomas Dang; 10,673 – 46.6%	Tunde Obasan; 9,881 – 43.2%		Pramod Kumar; 2,156 – 9.4%	Ben Roach (Gr.); 180 – 0.8%	New District
Edmonton-South West	John Archer; 8,743 – 41.4%	Kaycee Madu; 9,602 – 45.5%		Mo Elsalhy; 2,457 – 11.6%	**Marilyn Burns** (AAP); 195 – 0.9% Rigel Vincent (Gr.); 119 – 0.6%	Thomas Dang ‡
Edmonton-Whitemud	Rakhi Pancholi; 11,373 – 49.2%	Elisabeth Hughes; 9,120 – 39.4%		Jonathan Dai; 2,335 – 10.1%	Jason Norris (FCP); 297 – 1.3%	Bob Turner †

==== Suburbs ====
Electoral district	Candidates					Incumbent
Electoral district	NDP	UCP	Liberal	Alberta Party	Other	Incumbent
Fort Saskatchewan-Vegreville	Jessica Littlewood; 7,790 – 29.4%	Jackie Armstrong Homeniuk; 14,233 – 53.6%		Marvin Olsen; 3,386 – 12.8%	Malcolm Stinson (FCP); 350 – 1.3% Rebecca Trotter (Gr.); 278 – 1.0% Shane Ladouceur (AIP); 261 – 1.0% Ronald Malowany (AAP); 241 – 0.9%	Jessica Littlewood
Leduc-Beaumont	Shaye Anderson; 7,251 – 28.3%	Brad Rutherford; 14,982 – 58.4%	Chris Fenske; 212 – 0.8%	Robb Connelly; 2,206 – 8.6%	Gil Poitras (AAP); 304 – 1.2% Jeff Rout (FCP); 258 – 1.0% Jenn Roach (Gr.); 203 – 0.8% Kevin Dunn (AIP); 165 – 0.6% Sharon Maclise (Ind.); 71 – 0.3%	Shaye Anderson
Morinville-St. Albert	Natalie Birnie; 8,908 – 33.2%	Dale Nally; 13,435 – 50.0%		Neil Korotash; 3,963 – 14.8%	Mike van Velzen (AIP); 204 – 0.8% Cass Romyn (Gr.); 198 – 0.7% Tamara Krywiak (AAP); 157 – 0.6%	New District
St. Albert	Marie Renaud; 12,336 – 46.2%	Jeff Wedman; 10,682 – 40.0%	Kevin McLean; 317 – 1.2%	Barry Bailey; 2,817 – 10.6%	Cameron Jefferies (Gr.); 229 – 0.9% Sheldon Gron (AIP); 172 – 0.6% Don Petruka (AAP); 139 – 0.5%	Marie Renaud
Sherwood Park	Annie McKitrick; 10,685 – 40.0%	Jordan Walker; 12,119 – 45.4%		Sue Timanson; 3,509 – 13.1%	Brian Ilkuf (AIP); 216 – 0.8% Chris Glassford (AAP); 183 – 0.7%	Annie McKitrick
Spruce Grove-Stony Plain	Erin Babcock; 7,836 – 29.4%	Searle Turton; 15,843 – 59.4%		Ivan G. Boles; 2,597 – 9.7%	Jody Crocker (AIP); 417 – 1.6%	Erin Babcock; Stony Plain
Spruce Grove-Stony Plain	Erin Babcock; 7,836 – 29.4%	Searle Turton; 15,843 – 59.4%		Ivan G. Boles; 2,597 – 9.7%	Jody Crocker (AIP); 417 – 1.6%	Merged riding
Spruce Grove-Stony Plain	Erin Babcock; 7,836 – 29.4%	Searle Turton; 15,843 – 59.4%		Ivan G. Boles; 2,597 – 9.7%	Jody Crocker (AIP); 417 – 1.6%	Vivienne Horne (Canadian politician) †; Spruce Grove-St. Albert
Strathcona-Sherwood Park	Moira Váne; 8,695 – 32.3%	Nate Glubish; 14,151 – 52.5%		Dave Quest; 3,605 – 13.4%	Don Melanson (AAP); 147 – 0.5% Albert Aris (Gr.); 142 – 0.5% Richard Scinta (AIP); 141 – 0.5% Larry Maclise (Ind.); 67 – 0.2%	Estefania Cortes-Vargas †

=== Central Alberta ===
==== West ====
Electoral district	Candidates					Incumbent
Electoral district	NDP	UCP	Liberal	Alberta Party	Other	Incumbent
Drayton Valley-Devon	Kieran Quirke; 4,233 – 16.6%	Mark Smith; 18,092 – 71.1%	Ronald Brochu; 217 – 0.9%	Gail Upton; 1,634 – 6.4%	Steve Goodman (FCP); 624 – 2.5% Mark Gregor (AAP); 298 – 1.2% Les Marks (AIP); 233 – 0.9% Carol Nordlund Kinsey (Ind.); 106 – 0.4%	Mark Smith
Innisfail-Sylvan Lake	Robyn O'Brien; 3,453 – 13.5%	Devin Dreeshen; 19,030 – 74.5%		Danielle Klooster; 2,337 – 9.2%	Chad Miller (FCP); 359 – 1.4% Brian Vanderkley (AAP); 164 – 0.6% Ed Wychopen (Ind.); 106 – 0.4% Lauren Thorsteinson (Ref.); 79 – 0.3%	Devin Dreeshen
Lac Ste. Anne-Parkland	Oneil Carlier; 5,646 – 23.4%	Shane Getson; 15,860 – 65.7%		Donald Walter McCargar; 1,870 – 7.8%	Gordon W. McMillan (AIP); 413 – 1.7% Darien Masse (AAP); 337 – 1.4%	Oneil Carlier; Whitecourt-Ste. Anne
Red Deer-North	Kim Schreiner; 4,873 – 23.2%	Adriana LaGrange; 12,739 – 60.6%		Paul Hardy; 2,769 – 13.2%	Matt Chapin (FCP); 389 – 1.9% Michael Neufeld (AIP); 248 – 1.2%	Kim Schreiner
Red Deer-South	Barb Miller; 6,844 – 25.5%	Jason Stephan; 16,159 – 60.3%		Ryan McDougall; 3,244 – 12.1%	Teah-Jay Cartwright (FCP); 299 – 1.1% Lori Curran (Gr.); 246 – 0.9%	Barb Miller
Rimbey-Rocky Mountain House-Sundre	Jeff Ible; 2,293 – 9.1%	Jason Nixon; 20,579 – 81.6%		Joe Anglin; 1,350 – 5.4%	Dawn Berard (FCP); 303 – 1.2% Jane Drummond (Gr.); 286 – 1.1% David Rogers (AIP); 185 – 0.7% Paula Lamoureux (AAP); 161 – 0.6% Gordon Francey (Ind.); 50 – 0.2%	Jason Nixon
West Yellowhead	Paula Cackett; 4,912 – 20.5%	Martin Long; 16,381 – 68.3%		Kristie Gomuwka; 2,073 – 8.6%	Paul Lupyczuk (AAP); 261 – 1.1% Travis Poirier (AIP); 229 – 1.0% David Pearce (Ind.); 123 – 0.5%	Eric Rosendahl †

==== East ====
Electoral district	Candidates					Incumbent
Electoral district	NDP	UCP	Liberal	Alberta Party	Other	Incumbent
Camrose	Morgan Bamford; 4,387 – 18.4%	Jackie Lovely; 15,587 – 65.3%		Kevin Smook; 3,059 – 12.8%	Wes Caldwell (FCP); 387 – 1.6% Sandra Kim (AAP); 173 – 0.7% Don Dubitz (AIP); 158 – 0.7% Bonnie Tanton (Ind.); 126 – 0.5%	Wes Taylor †; Battle River-Wainwright
Drumheller-Stettler	Holly Heffernan; 1,446 – 6.5%	Nate Horner; 16,958 – 76.7%		Mark Nikota; 1,461 – 6.6%	Rick Strankman (Ind.); 1,841 – 8.3% Jason Hushagen (AIP); 230 – 1.0% Greg Herzog (AAP); 176 – 0.8%	Rick Strankman
Lacombe-Ponoka	Doug Hart; 3,639 – 14.9%	Ron Orr; 17,379 – 71.3%		Myles Chykerda; 2,520 – 10.3%	Keith Parrill (FCP); 328 – 1.3% Tessa Szwagierczak (AIP); 279 – 1.1% Shawn Tylke (AAP); 227 – 0.9%	Ron Orr
Maskwacis-Wetaskiwin	Bruce Hinkley; 4,737 – 23.7%	Rick Wilson; 12,796 – 64.1%		Sherry Greene; 1,382 – 6.9%	David White (FCP); 522 – 2.6% Wesley Rea (AAP); 263 – 1.3% Desmond G. Bull (Gr.); 256 – 1.3%	Bruce Hinkley; Wetaskiwin-Camrose
Vermilion-Lloydminster-Wainwright	Ryan Clarke; 2,490 – 9.9%	Garth Rowswell; 19,768 – 78.8%		Craig G. Peterson; 1,615 – 6.4%	Jim McKinnon (FCP); 898 – 3.6% Kelly Zeleny (AAP); 170 – 0.7% Robert McFadzean (Ind.); 133 – 0.5%	Richard Starke †; Vermilion-Lloydminster

=== Calgary ===
==== Central ====
Electoral district	Candidates					Incumbent
Electoral district	NDP	UCP	Liberal	Alberta Party	Other	Incumbent
Calgary-Buffalo	Joe Ceci; 11,292 – 48.9%	Tom Olsen; 9,050 – 39.2%	Jennifer Khan; 590 – 2.6%	Omar Masood; 1,597 – 6.9%	Heather Morigeau (Gr.); 436 – 1.9% Cody Hetherington (AIP); 147 – 0.6%	Kathleen Ganley ‡
Calgary-Currie	Brian Malkinson; 9,769 – 42.9%	Nicholas Milliken; 9,960 – 43.7%	Joshua Codd; 491 – 2.2%	Lindsay Luhnau; 2,512 – 11.0%	Lucas C. Hernandez (Pro-Life); 60 – 0.3%	Brian Malkinson
Calgary-Elbow	Janet Eremenko; 5,796 – 23.5%	Doug Schweitzer; 10,951 – 44.3%	Robin MacKintosh; 275 – 1.1%	Greg Clark; 7,542 – 30.5%	Quinn Rupert (Gr.); 132 – 0.5%	Greg Clark
Calgary-Klein	Craig Coolahan; 8,776 – 39.9%	Jeremy Nixon; 10,473 – 47.6%	Michael J. Macdonald; 396 – 1.8%	Kara Levis; 1,842 – 8.4%	Janine St. Jean (Gr.); 294 – 1.3% CW Alexander (AIP); 214 – 1.0%	Craig Coolahan
Calgary-Mountain View	Kathleen T. Ganley; 12,526 – 47.3%	Jeremy Wong; 9,708 – 36.7%	**David Khan**; 1,474 – 5.6%	Angela Kokott; 2,345 – 8.9%	Thana Boonlert (Gr.); 315 – 1.2% Monica Friesz (AIP); 102 – 0.4%	David Swann †
Calgary-Varsity	Anne McGrath; 10,215 – 43.4%	Jason Copping; 10,853 – 46.2%	Ryan Campbell; 383 – 1.6%	Beth Barberree; 1,687 – 7.2%	**Cheryle Chagnon-Greyeyes** (Gr.); 274 – 1.2% Chris McAndrew (AIP); 101 – 0.4%	Vacant

==== East ====
Electoral district	Candidates					Incumbent
Electoral district	NDP	UCP	Liberal	Alberta Party	Other	Incumbent
Calgary-Cross	Ricardo Miranda; 6,135 – 37.4%	Mickey Amery; 8,907 – 54.3%	Naser Kukhun; 410 – 2.5%	Braham Luddu; 962 – 5.9%		Ricardo Miranda
Calgary-East	Cesar Cala; 4,867 – 32.2%	Peter Singh; 7,520 – 49.7%	Michelle Robinson; 439 – 2.9%	Gar Gar; 1,879 – 12.4%	William Carnegie (Gr.); 351 – 2.3% Jonathan Trautman (Comm.); 69 – 0.5%	Robyn Luff †
Calgary-Falconridge	Parmeet Singh Boparai; 6,662 – 44.9%	Devinder Toor; 6,753 – 45.6%	Deepak Sharma; 561 – 3.8%	Jasbir Singh Dhari; 849 – 5.7%		Prab Gill †; Calgary-Greenway
Calgary-McCall	Irfan Sabir; 6,567 – 51.7%	Jasraj Singh Hallan; 4,851 – 38.2%	Faiza Ali Abdi; 281 – 2.2%	Avinash Singh Khangura; 636 – 5.0%	Janice Fraser (Gr.); 218 – 1.7% Don Edmonstone (AIP); 84 – 0.7% Larry Smith (AAP); 60 – 0.5%	Irfan Sabir
Calgary-North East	Gurbachan Brar; 6,046 – 35.6%	Rajan Sawhney; 8,376 – 49.3%	Gul Khan; 761 – 4.5%	Nate Pike; 1,791 – 10.6%		New District
Calgary-Peigan	Joe Pimlott; 6,527 – 29.2%	Tanya Fir; 13,353 – 59.8%	Jaro Giesbrecht; 425 – 1.9%	Ronald Reinhold; 1,534 – 6.9%	Sheyne Espey (FCP); 299 – 1.3% Will Hatch (AIP); 180 – 0.8%	Joe Ceci ‡ Calgary-Fort

==== Northwest ====
Electoral district	Candidates					Incumbent
Electoral district	NDP	UCP	Liberal	Alberta Party	Other	Incumbent
Calgary-Beddington	Amanda Chapman; 7,818 – 35.7%	Josephine Pon; 11,625 – 53.1%	Chandan Tadavalkar; 370 – 1.7%	Carol-Lynn Darch; 1,799 – 8.2%	Tom Grbich (AIP); 161 – 0.7% Alexander Dea (Ind.); 117 – 0.5%	Karen McPherson †; Calgary-Mackay-Nose Hill
Calgary-Bow	Deborah Drever; 8,548 – 34.2%	Demetrios Nicolaides; 13,987 – 55.9%	Daniel Ejumabone; 320 – 1.3%	Paul Godard; 1,774 – 7.1%	Marion Westoll (Gr.); 233 – 0.9% Regina Shakirova (FCP); 161 – 0.6%	Deborah Drever
Calgary-Edgemont	Julia Hayter; 8,570 – 34.0%	Prasad Panda; 13,308 – 52.8%	Graeme Maitland; 305 – 1.2%	Joanne Gui; 2,740 – 10.9%	Carl Svoboda (Gr.); 155 – 0.6% Tomasz Kochanowicz (AIP); 106 – 0.4%	Michael Connolly †; Calgary-Hawkwood
Calgary-Foothills	Sameena Arif; 6,985 – 32.4%	Jason Luan; 12,277 – 57.0%	Andrea Joyce; 379 – 1.8%	Jennifer Wyness; 1,680 – 7.8%	Kari Pomerleau (FCP); 142 – 0.7% Kyle Miller (AIP); 80 – 0.4%	Prasad Panda ‡
Calgary-North	Kelly Mandryk; 4,731 – 31.1%	Muhammad Yaseen; 8,409 – 55.2%	Saliha Haq; 365 – 2.4%	Gary Arora; 1,591 – 10.5%	Brad Hopkins (AIP); 128 – 0.8%	Jamie Kleinsteuber †; Calgary-Northern Hills
Calgary-North West	Hafeez Chishti; 7,611 – 31.8%	Sonya Savage; 13,565 – 56.7%	Prerna Mahtani; 258 – 1.1%	Andrew Bradley; 2,171 – 9.1%	Cam Khan (FCP); 262 – 1.1% Roberta McDonald (Ind.); 69 – 0.3%	Sandra Jansen †
Calgary-West	Gulshan Akter; 5,769 – 25.5%	Mike Ellis; 14,978 – 66.1%	Yasna Oluic-Kovacevic; 309 – 1.4%	Frank Penkala; 1,595 – 7.0%		Mike Ellis

==== South ====
Electoral district	Candidates					Incumbent
Electoral district	NDP	UCP	Liberal	Alberta Party	Other	Incumbent
Calgary-Acadia	Kate Andrews; 8,049 – 34.6%	Tyler Shandro; 12,615 – 54.3%	Lorrisa Good; 350 – 1.5%	Lana Bentley; 1,728 – 7.4%	Patrick Reilly (AIP); 245 – 1.1% Amanda Bishop (Gr.); 243 – 1.0%	Brandy Payne †
Calgary-Fish Creek	Rebecca Bounsall; 7,476 – 28.8%	Richard Gotfried; 15,975 – 61.5%	John Roggeveen; 359 – 1.4%	Robert Tremblay; 1,699 – 6.5%	Taylor Stasila (Gr.); 231 – 0.9% Tomas Manasek (AIP); 226 – 0.9%	Richard Gotfried
Calgary-Glenmore	Jordan Stein; 8,739 – 32.0%	Whitney Issik; 14,565 – 55.6%	Shirley Ksienski; 424 – 1.6%	Scott Appleby; 2,217 – 8.5%	Allie Tulick (Gr.); 311 – 1.2% Dejan Ristic (FCP); 159 – 0.6% Rafael Krukowski (AIP); 123 – 0.5%	Anam Kazim †
Calgary-Hays	Tory Tomblin; 5,706 – 25.4%	Richard William "Ric" McIver; 14,186 – 63.2%	Frances Woytkiw; 293 – 1.3%	Chris Nowell; 2,052 – 9.1%	Kenneth Morrice (AIP); 211 – 0.9%	Ric McIver
Calgary-Lougheed	Julia Bietz; 4,334 – 24.5%	**Jason Kenney**; 11,633 – 65.7%	Wilson McCutchan; 219 – 1.2%	Rachel Timmermans; 1,365 – 7.7%	Peter de Jonk (AIP); 101 – 0.6% Larry R. Heather (Ind.); 55 – 0.3%	Jason Kenney
Calgary-Shaw	Graham Dean Sucha; 5,594 – 25.6%	Rebecca Schulz; 14,261 – 65.3%	Vesna Samardzija; 290 – 1.3%	Bronson Ha; 1,331 – 6.1%	John Daly (Gr.); 212 – 1.0% Jarek Bucholc (AIP); 146 – 0.7%	Graham Sucha
Calgary-South East	Heather Eddy; 3,983 – 19.0%	Matt Jones; 12,860 – 61.2%	Leila Keith; 224 – 1.1%	Rick Fraser; 3,810 – 18.1%	Richard Fontaine (AIP); 134 – 0.6%	Rick Fraser

==== Suburbs ====
Electoral district	Candidates					Incumbent
Electoral district	NDP	UCP	Liberal	Alberta Party	Other	Incumbent
Airdrie-Cochrane	Steve Durrell; 7,183 – 25.2%	Peter Guthrie; 18,777 – 66.0%		Vern Raincock; 1,818 – 6.4%	Danielle Cameron (AIP); 345 – 1.2% Matthew Joseph Morrisey (FCP); 331 – 1.2%	New District
Airdrie-East	Roxie Baez Zamora; 4,960 – 19.9%	Angela Pitt; 16,764 – 67.3%		Alex Luterbach; 2,371 – 9.5%	Rick Northey (FCP); 482 – 1.9% Jeff Olson (AIP); 213 – 0.9% Richard Absalom D. Herdman (Ind.); 112 – 0.4%	Angela Pitt; Airdrie
Banff-Kananaskis	Cameron "Cam" Westhead; 8,890 – 42.0%	Miranda Rosin; 10,859 – 51.3%	Gwyneth Midgley; 228 – 1.1%	Brenda Stanton; 941 – 4.4%	Anita Crowshoe (AIP); 154 – 0.7% Dave Phillips (Ind.); 80 – 0.4%	Cam Westhead; Banff-Cochrane
Chestermere-Strathmore	Melissa Langmaid; 3,558 – 15.6%	Leela Sharon Aheer; 15,612 – 68.5%	Sharon L. Howe; 238 – 1.0%	Jason Avramenko; 1,460 – 6.4%	**Derek Fildebrandt** (FCP); 1,683 – 7.4% Roger Dean Walker (AIP); 136 – 0.6% Terry Nicholls (Ind.); 112 – 0.5%	Leela Aheer; Chestermere-Rocky View
Highwood	Erik Overland; 4,453 – 17.5%	R.J. Sigurdson; 18,635 – 73.3%		Ron Kerr; 1,988 – 7.8%	Don Irving (AIP); 362 – 1.4%	Wayne Anderson †
Olds-Didsbury-Three Hills	Kyle Johnston; 3,070 – 11.8%	Nathan Cooper; 20,516 – 78.6%		Chase Brown; 1,779 – 6.8%	Allen MacLennan (FCP); 557 – 2.1% Dave Hughes (AAP); 195 – 0.7%	Nathan Cooper

=== Southern Alberta ===
Electoral district	Candidates					Incumbent
Electoral district	NDP	UCP	Liberal	Alberta Party	Other	Incumbent
Brooks-Medicine Hat	Lynn MacWilliam; 4,012 – 17.9%	Michaela Glasgo; 13,606 – 60.7%	Jamah Bashir Farah; 281 – 1.3%	Jim Black; 1,554 – 6.9%	Todd Beasley (Ind.); 2,759 – 12.3% Collin Pacholek (AIP); 218 – 1.0%	Derek Fildebrandt ‡ Strathmore-Brooks
Brooks-Medicine Hat	Lynn MacWilliam; 4,012 – 17.9%	Michaela Glasgo; 13,606 – 60.7%	Jamah Bashir Farah; 281 – 1.3%	Jim Black; 1,554 – 6.9%	Todd Beasley (Ind.); 2,759 – 12.3% Collin Pacholek (AIP); 218 – 1.0%	Merged riding
Brooks-Medicine Hat	Lynn MacWilliam; 4,012 – 17.9%	Michaela Glasgo; 13,606 – 60.7%	Jamah Bashir Farah; 281 – 1.3%	Jim Black; 1,554 – 6.9%	Todd Beasley (Ind.); 2,759 – 12.3% Collin Pacholek (AIP); 218 – 1.0%	Bob Wanner †; Medicine Hat
Cardston-Siksika	Kirby Smith; 2,606 – 16.0%	Joseph Schow; 11,980 – 73.5%	Cathleen McFarland; 173 – 1.1%	Casey Douglass; 589 – 3.6%	Ian A. Donovan (Ind.); 727 – 4.5% Jerry Gautreau (FCP); 214 – 1.3%	Dave Schneider †; Little Bow
Cypress-Medicine Hat	Peter Mueller; 6,396 – 26.0%	Drew Barnes; 16,483 – 67.1%	Anwar Kamaran; 219 – 0.9%	Collette Smithers; 1,122 – 4.6%	Terry Blacquier (AAP); 359 – 1.5%	Drew Barnes
Lethbridge-East	Maria Fitzpatrick; 8,775 – 38.7%	Nathan Neudorf; 11,883 – 52.4%	Devon Hargreaves; 512 – 2.3%	Ally Taylor; 1,054 – 4.6%	John W. McCanna (AIP); 453 – 2.0%	Maria Fitzpatrick
Lethbridge-West	Shannon Phillips; 11,016 – 45.2%	Karri Flatla; 10,790 – 44.3%	Pat Chizek; 460 – 1.9%	Zac Rhodenizer; 1,763 – 7.2%	Ben Maddison (AIP); 332 – 1.4%	Shannon Phillips
Livingstone-Macleod	Cam Gardner; 5,125 – 20.5%	Roger Reid; 17,644 – 70.6%	Dylin Hauser; 258 – 1.0%	Tim Meech; 1,276 – 5.1%	Vern Sparkes (AIP); 430 – 1.7% Wendy Pergentile (Gr.); 244 – 1.0%	Pat Stier †
Taber-Warner	Laura Ross-Giroux; 2,363 – 12.9%	Grant R. Hunter; 14,321 – 78.1%	Amy Yates; 205 – 1.1%	Jason Beekman; 1,443 – 7.9%		Grant Hunter; Cardston-Taber-Warner

== See also ==
- 2019 Canadian federal election in Alberta
