= Matt Jones (Canadian politician) =

Canadian politician

The Honourable Matt Jones ECA MLA

Minister of Hospital and Surgical Health Services
- In office May 16, 2025 – May 21, 2026
- Premier: Danielle Smith
- Preceded by: Adriana LaGrange (Note: "Health" split into "Hospital and Surgical Health Services" and "Primary and Preventive Health Services")
- Succeeded by: Adriana LaGrange

Minister of Jobs, Economy and Trade
- In office June 9, 2023 – May 16, 2025
- Premier: Danielle Smith
- Preceded by: Brian Jean
- Succeeded by: Joseph Schow

Minister of Affordability and Utilities
- In office October 21, 2022 – June 9, 2023
- Premier: Danielle Smith
- Preceded by: Position created
- Succeeded by: Nathan Neudorf

Minister of Children's Services
- In office June 11, 2022 – October 21, 2022
- Premier: Jason Kenney, Danielle Smith
- Preceded by: Rebecca Schulz
- Succeeded by: Mickey Amery

Member of the Legislative Assembly of Alberta for Calgary-South East
- Incumbent
- Assumed office April 16, 2019
- Preceded by: Rick Fraser

Personal details
- Party: United Conservative Party
- Website: mattjones.ucp2023.ca

Matt Jones ECA MLA is a Canadian politician who was elected in the 2019 Alberta general election to represent the electoral district of Calgary-South East. He was re-elected in 2023.

== Early life ==
Jones was born in Sparwood, British Columbia, and moved to Alberta at the age of seven. His father worked in the coal industry. Jones began working full-time, at Dairy Queen, at the age of 14 in addition to going to school. He studied at the University of Calgary and holds a bachelor of commerce degree. After graduation, he worked as an investment banker for nine years, obtaining the CFA Charter in the process.

== Career ==
Jones was the Minister of Jobs, Economy and Trade from 2022 to 2025 as well as being active on the Alberta First Cabinet Policy Committee. He previously served as the Minister of Children’s Affairs. He was also the Deputy Chair on the Standing Committee on the Alberta Heritage Savings Trust Fund and the Select Special Child and Youth Advocate Search Committee. Matt Jones also used to be active on the Standing Committee on Privileges and Elections, Standing Orders and Printing as well as the Standing Committee on Alberta’s Economic Future. On May 16, 2025, when the Ministry of Health was split into two ministries, Jones was shuffled to Minister of Hospital and Surgical Health Services.

Jones sponsored multiple bills, including Bill Pr1; Calgary Young Men’s Christian Association Amendment Act, as well as Bill 205; Human Tissue and Organ Donation (Presumed Consent) Amendment Act.

As Minister of Affordability and Utilities, Matt Jones also sponsored Bill 2; Inflation Relief Statutes Amendment Act. This act, assented to on December 15, 2022, allowed the province to give $600 inflation-relief to eligible families. For instance, families making under $180,000 a year would get $100 per month for six months for every child under 18. He also estimated that the province had provided $900 of relief per household as of March 6, 2023. After being appointed Minister of Hospital and Surgical Health Services in 2025, he stepped down in May 2026 and opted to not seek re-election in the next Alberta general election.

== Personal life ==
He now lives with his wife, Tarena, and their four children in south-east Calgary.

== Electoral history ==
2023 Alberta general election: Calgary-South East
| Party | Candidate | Votes | % | ±% |
|---|---|---|---|---|
| United Conservative | Matt Jones | 14,087 | 58.82 | -2.39 |
| New Democratic | Justin Huseby | 9,442 | 39.42 | +20.47 |
| Green | Catriona Wright | 318 | 1.33 | – |
| Solidarity Movement | Heinrich Friesen | 104 | 0.43 | – |
| Total | | 23,951 | 99.39 | – |
| Rejected and declined | | 146 | 0.61 | |
| Turnout | | 24,097 | 62.81 | |
| Eligible voters | | 38,368 | | |
| United Conservative hold | | Swing | | -11.43 |
Source(s) Source: Elections Alberta

2019 Alberta general election: Calgary-South East
| Party | Candidate | Votes | % | ±% |
|---|---|---|---|---|
| United Conservative | Matt Jones | 12,860 | 61.21% | -0.48% |
| New Democratic | Heather Eddy | 3,983 | 18.96% | -12.23% |
| Alberta Party | Rick Fraser | 3,810 | 18.13% | – |
| Liberal | Leila Keith | 224 | 1.07% | -4.46% |
| Alberta Independence | Richard Fontaine | 134 | 0.64% | – |
| Total | | 21,011 | – | – |
| Rejected, spoiled and declined | | 47 | 66 | 5 |
| Eligible electors / turnout | | 29,578 | 71.21% | 20.63% |
| United Conservative gain from Alberta Party | | Swing | | 20.48% |
Source(s) Source: "24 - Calgary-South East, 2019 Alberta general election". officialresults.elections.ab.ca. Elections Alberta. UCP change is based on combination of Progressive Conservative and Wildrose results from the 2015 Alberta general election.
