= Anne McGrath =

Canadian political advisor (born c. 1958)

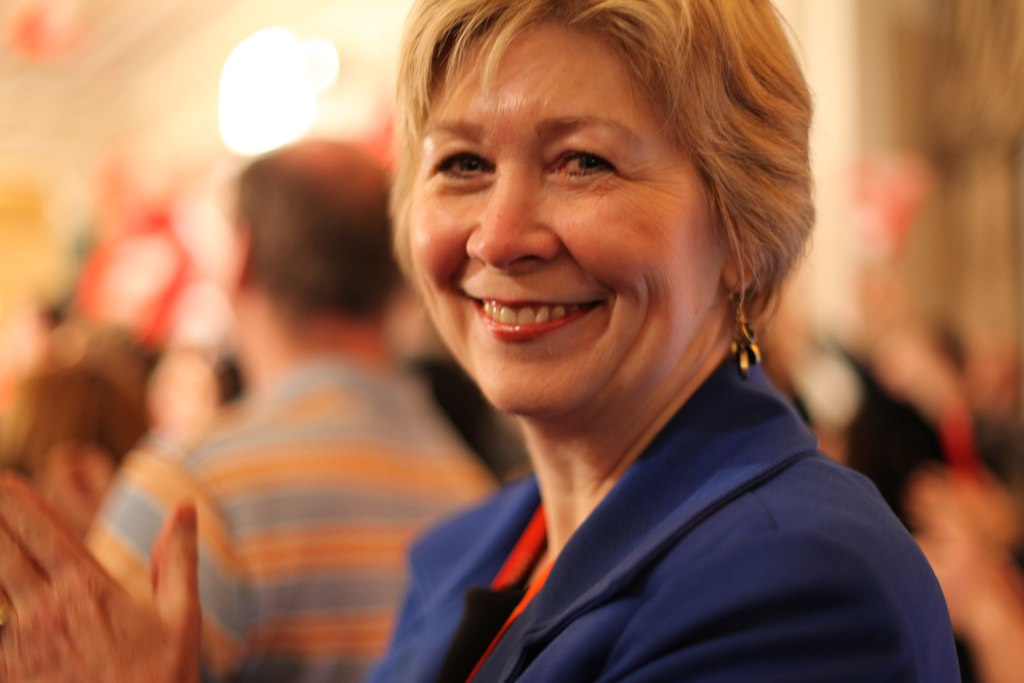
- McGrath at the NDP's 2011 federal election campaign launch

National Director of the New Democratic Party
- In office 2019–2024
- Leader: Jagmeet Singh
- Preceded by: Melissa Bruno
- Succeeded by: Lucy Watson
- In office 2014–2015
- Leader: Tom Mulcair
- Preceded by: Nathan Rothman
- Succeeded by: Karl Bélanger

Principal Secretary to the Premier of Alberta
- In office June 2016 – April 2019
- Premier: Rachel Notley

President of the New Democratic Party
- In office September 10, 2006 – August 16, 2009
- Leader: Jack Layton
- Preceded by: Adam Giambrone
- Succeeded by: Peggy Nash

Personal details
- Born: c. 1958 Aldershot, England
- Party: New Democratic Party (since at least 1993)
- Other political affiliations: Communist Party of Canada (1984)

Anne McGrath (born c. 1958) is a Canadian political advisor and strategist. McGrath was president of the New Democratic Party from 2006 to 2009, National Director of the NDP from 2019 to 2024 and previously from 2014 to 2015, principal secretary to former Alberta Premier Rachel Notley, and as Notley's deputy chief of staff. McGrath also served as the principal secretary to federal NDP leader Jagmeet Singh in the House of Commons.

== Background ==
McGrath was born in Aldershot, England to Irish parents. Her family moved to Montreal when she was a child and later to Ottawa. Her father was a school principal and her mother was a teacher.

McGrath was a student at St. Pius X in Ottawa in 1975 when Robert Poulin, an 18-year-old, opened fire on his classmates with a shotgun, killing a 17-year-old classmate named Mark Hough and wounding five others before killing himself with a shotgun blast to the head.

She studied English literature at the University of Ottawa and in 1979–80 she was President of the Student Federation of the University of Ottawa.

After graduating, she moved to Edmonton to work as a field organizer for the Alberta Federation of Students while studying for an education degree at the University of Alberta and became politically active.

She graduated with a Bachelor of Education from the University of Alberta and began her career as a teacher. She then held a variety of positions with not-for-profit organizations including working as Canadian Programme Officer for Oxfam Canada and Community Development Team Leader and senior education officer for the Canadian Mental Health Association. She has a master's degree in communications studies. She has worked as a managing director at the lobbying firm Ensight, and is an associate at the public relations firm Hill+Knowlton Strategies. She has also served as a board member and social issues chair of the Elizabeth Fry Society, Vice-President of National Action Committee on the Status of Women, and a member of the Steering Committee for the Canadian Feminist Alliance for International Action: Beijing and Beyond.

McGrath is a frequent commentator on national media broadcasts and has been identified as one of the 100 most influential people in government and politics in Ottawa. She has been an activist in the labour, student and women's movements and had been employed by CUPE National as Director of Equality and as executive assistant to CUPE's national president Judy Darcy, and by Oxfam Canada.

== Politics ==
In the 1984 federal election, while a student, she ran as candidate for the Communist Party of Canada in Edmonton—Strathcona, placing seventh. Of her involvement with the Communist Party she says "I was young, probably naïve, interested in talking about politics. And very influenced by friends and teachers." At a debate at the Calgary Varsity Centre in April 2019, McGrath apologised for her past involvement with the Communist Party saying she was no longer a Communist stating, "Four decades ago when I was a young student, I was a member [of the Communist Party] and I deeply regret that. It was a mistake and I'm very sorry."

In 1993, McGrath was the Alberta New Democratic Party's candidate in Calgary-Bow. In 1995 she was its candidate in a provincial by-election in Calgary-McCall and came in third place. In 1995, she unsuccessfully challenged Ross Harvey for the leadership of the Alberta New Democratic Party.

McGrath was president of the New Democratic Party from 2006 to 2009; she was elected on September 10, 2006, at the party's convention in Quebec City and her term ended on August 16, 2009 when Peggy Nash was elected president at the party's convention in Halifax. Before that, she had been director of operations for the NDP federal caucus.

As Chief of Staff to Jack Layton (2008–2011), she is credited with professionalizing caucus operations and with helping organize the party's historic breakthrough to Official Opposition status. She stayed on as chief of staff to interim party leader Nycole Turmel and the federal NDP Caucus, during Turmel's interim leadership. McGrath also served as the National Director of the New Democratic Party (NDP) of Canada (2014-2015).

McGrath served as principal secretary to former Alberta Premier Rachel Notley and as Notley's deputy chief of staff.

McGrath was the NDP candidate in Calgary-Varsity in the 2019 Alberta general election.

She was portrayed by Wendy Crewson in the 2013 CBC Television film Jack.

== Electoral record ==
=== Federal ===
1984 Canadian federal election: Edmonton Strathcona
Party	Candidate	Votes	%	±%
Progressive Conservative	David Kilgour	33,712	61.43	+2.06
New Democratic	Doris S. Burghardt	11,095	20.22	+8.21
Liberal	Sandra Douglas--Tubb	8,500	15.49	–11.66
Confederation of Regions	Lorne Cass	749	1.37	–
Green	Russell John Mulvey	466	0.85	–
Social Credit	Norman Utz	218	0.40	–
Communist	Anne McGrath	137	0.25	–0.01
Total valid votes		54,877	99.75	
Total rejected ballots		139	0.25	+0.03
Turnout		55,016	67.84	+9.48
Eligible voters		81,096		
Progressive Conservative hold		Swing		
Source: Elections Canada

=== Provincial ===
2019 Alberta general election: Calgary-Varsity
Party	Candidate	Votes	%	±%
United Conservative	Jason Copping	10,853	46.16	+1.90
New Democratic	Anne McGrath	10,215	43.44	+3.29
Alberta Party	Beth Barberree	1,687	7.17	+6.05
Liberal	Ryan Campbell	383	1.63	-10.48
Green	Cheryle Chagnon-Greyeyes	274	1.17	-1.04
Independence	Chris McAndrew	101	0.43	New
Total valid votes		23,513	99.89	
Rejected, spoiled and declined		264	1.11	
Turnout		23,777	73.34	
Eligible electors		32,422		
United Conservative notional hold		Swing		-0.69
Source(s) "2019 Provincial General Election Results". Elections Alberta.

Alberta provincial by-election, April 20, 1995: Calgary-McCall
Party	Candidate	Votes	%	±%
Progressive Conservative	Shiraz Shariff	2,496	43.64	−1.44
Liberal	Jeet Shergill	1,980	34.61	2.63
New Democratic	Anne McGrath	713	12.46	2.61
Social Credit	Doug Cooper	470	8.22	
Confederation of Regions	Peter Hope	61	1.07	−0.34
Total		5,720		
Rejected, spoiled and declined		17		
Eligible electors / Turnout		20,514	27.97	
Progressive Conservative hold		Swing		−2.04
Source: "Calgary-McCall by-election official results". Elections Alberta. April 20, 1995.

1993 Alberta general election: Calgary-Bow
Party	Candidate	Votes	%	±%
Progressive Conservative	Bonnie Laing	7,011	46.28%	11.39%
Liberal	Rob Van Walleghem	5,369	35.44%	1.22%
New Democratic	Anne McGrath	1,908	12.59%	-18.29%
Social Credit	Patrick John Hudson	376	2.48%	–
Greens	David Crowe	287	1.89%	–
Confederation of Regions	Roberta McDonald	120	0.79%	–
Natural Law	Alan Livingston	78	0.51%	–
Total		15,149	–	–
Rejected, spoiled and declined		60	–	–
Eligible electors / turnout		23,546	64.59%	12.48%
Progressive Conservative hold		Swing		5.09%
Source(s) Source: "Calgary-Bow Official Results 1993 Alberta general election". Alberta Heritage Community Foundation.

==== 1995 Alberta NDP leadership challenge ====
(Held on November 11, 1995)

- Ross Harvey 177
- Anne McGrath 118
- Joe Weykowich 30
- Lawrence Dubrofsky 3
