= Jason Copping =

Canadian politician

The Honourable Jason Copping ECA

Member of the Legislative Assembly of Alberta for Calgary-Varsity
- In office April 16, 2019 – May 29, 2023
- Preceded by: Stephanie McLean
- Succeeded by: Luanne Metz

Minister of Health
- In office September 21, 2021 – June 9, 2023
- Premier: Jason Kenney, Danielle Smith
- Preceded by: Tyler Shandro
- Succeeded by: Adriana LaGrange

Alberta Minister of Labour and Immigration
- In office April 30, 2019 – September 21, 2021
- Premier: Jason Kenney
- Preceded by: Christina Gray
- Succeeded by: Tyler Shandro

Personal details
- Party: United Conservative
- Education: Queen's University (MIR); York University (LLM)

Jason Copping ECA is a Canadian politician who was the minister of health for Alberta from September 21, 2021, to June 9, 2023. Elected in the 2019 Alberta general election to represent the electoral district of Calgary-Varsity, Copping is a member of the United Conservative Party (UCP). He previously was the labour and immigration minister from April 20, 2019, to September 21, 2021.

== Background ==
Before his election to the legislature, Copping worked in the transportation sector as a human resources and labour relations manager. He holds a Master of Industrial Relations (MIR) from Queen’s University and a master's degree in law with a specialization in labour and employment law from Osgoode Hall, York University. Copping also worked as a sessional instructor for several years at both the University of Calgary as well as the University of Lethbridge.

== Political career ==
Copping was elected as a member of the Legislative Assembly (MLA) following the 2019 election, representing the United Conservative Party. Copping served as minister of labour and immigration from 2019 to 2021, before he was named minister of health in 2021, swapping portfolios with Tyler Shandro, who then took over as labour minister.

On January 17, 2022, Copping announced that he had tested positive for COVID-19.

As a legislator, Copping has advanced several pieces of legislation as their sponsor. During his time as Minister of Health, he sponsored the Alberta Health Care Insurance Act which removed from the government the ability to strike down its master agreement with doctors. In addition, he also sponsored the Continuing Care Act which aimed to provide consistency of standards in supported living and long-term care settings.

In the 2023 Alberta general election, Copping was defeated by New Democratic Party (NDP) candidate Luanne Metz.

== Electoral history ==
2023 Alberta general election: Calgary-Varsity
Party	Candidate	Votes	%	±%
New Democratic	Luanne Metz	13,449	58.27	+14.83
United Conservative	Jason Copping	9,377	40.63	-5.53
Wildrose Loyalty Coalition	Oaklan Davidsen	141	0.61	–
Solidarity Movement	Kent Liang	112	0.49	–
Total valid votes		23,079	98.96	–
Rejected and declined		243	1.04	
Turnout		23,322	70.65	
Eligible electors		33,010		
New Democratic gain from United Conservative		Swing		+10.18
Source(s) Source: Elections Alberta

2019 Alberta general election: Calgary-Varsity
Party	Candidate	Votes	%	±%
United Conservative	Jason Copping	10,853	46.16	+1.90
New Democratic	Anne McGrath	10,215	43.44	+3.29
Alberta Party	Beth Barberree	1,687	7.17	+6.05
Liberal	Ryan Campbell	383	1.63	-10.48
Green	Cheryle Chagnon-Greyeyes	274	1.17	-1.04
Independence	Chris McAndrew	101	0.43	New
Total valid votes		23,513	99.89	
Rejected, spoiled and declined		264	1.11	
Turnout		23,777	73.34	
Eligible electors		32,422		
United Conservative notional hold		Swing		-0.69
Source(s) "2019 Provincial General Election Results". Elections Alberta.

Alberta provincial government of Jason Kenney
Cabinet posts (2)
Predecessor	Office	Successor
Tyler Shandro	Minister of Health; September 21, 2021 -	Incumbent
Christina Gray	Minister of Labour & Immigration; April 30, 2019 – September 21, 2021	Tyler Shandro
