= Cheryle Chagnon-Greyeyes =

Canadian politician

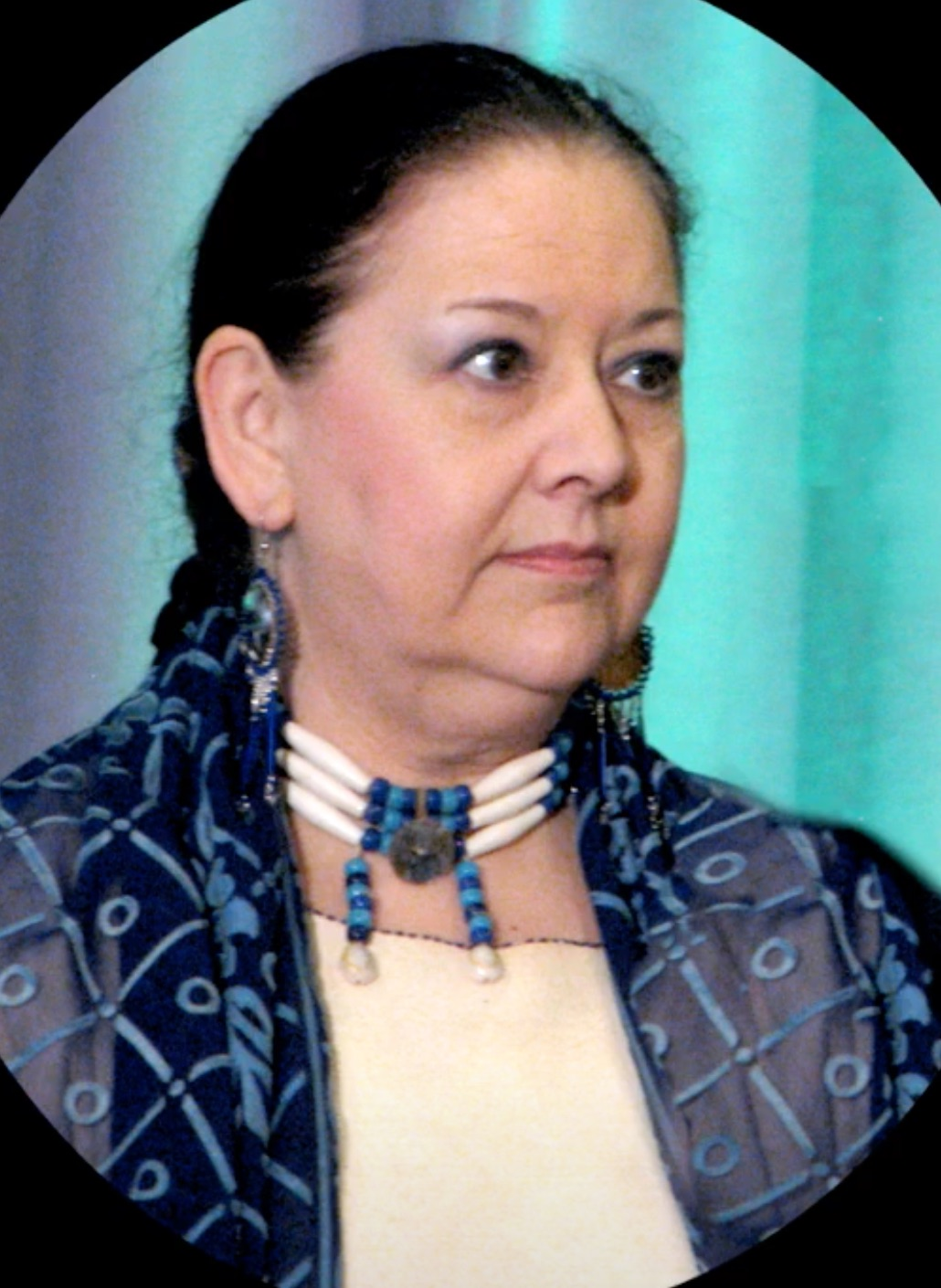

Leader of the Green Party of Alberta
- In office 24 September 2018 – 30 September 2019
- Preceded by: Romy Tittel
- Succeeded by: William Carnegie (Interim leader)

Personal details
- Citizenship: Canadian
- Party: Green Party of Alberta
- Profession: Administrative co-ordinator at the UCalgary Native Centre

Cheryle Chagnon-Greyeyes is a Canadian politician who served the leader of the Green Party of Alberta from September 2018 until her resignation in September 2019. She has worked at the University of Calgary and is Cree from Muskeg Lake Cree Nation. Chagnon-Greyeyes was the first Indigenous woman to lead a Canadian provincial party.

== Electoral record ==
2019 Alberta general election: Calgary-Varsity
Party	Candidate	Votes	%	±%
United Conservative	Jason Copping	10,853	46.16	+1.90
New Democratic	Anne McGrath	10,215	43.44	+3.29
Alberta Party	Beth Barberree	1,687	7.17	+6.05
Liberal	Ryan Campbell	383	1.63	-10.48
Green	Cheryle Chagnon-Greyeyes	274	1.17	-1.04
Independence	Chris McAndrew	101	0.43	New
Total valid votes		23,513	99.89	
Rejected, spoiled and declined		264	1.11	
Turnout		23,777	73.34	
Eligible electors		32,422		
United Conservative notional hold		Swing		-0.69
Source(s) "2019 Provincial General Election Results". Elections Alberta.
