= Rick Fraser (politician) =

Canadian politician

The Honourable Rick Fraser ECA

Member of the Legislative Assembly of Alberta for Calgary-South East
- In office April 23, 2012 – April 16, 2019
- Preceded by: Riding established
- Succeeded by: Matt Jones

Personal details
- Born: February 13, 1972 (age 54) Calgary, Alberta, Canada
- Party: Alberta Party (2018–present)
- Other political affiliations: Progressive Conservative (until 2017); United Conservative Party (2017); Independent (2017–2018)
- Education: Lakeland College
- Occupation: Paramedic, former hockey player

Richard Glenn Fraser ECA (born February 13, 1972) is a Canadian politician who was an elected member to the Legislative Assembly of Alberta representing the electoral district of Calgary-South East.

Elected as a Progressive Conservative Association of Alberta MLA in 2012, Fraser was sworn into the Redford cabinet in 2013 as Minister of Public Safety.

Fraser initially joined the rest of the PC caucus in its merger with the Wildrose Party to form the United Conservative Party in 2017. He left the caucus on September 21, 2017, to sit as an independent due to his dissatisfaction with the party's leadership contest and the emphasis put by candidates on spending cuts and austerity.

Fraser registered his candidacy for the leadership of the Alberta Party on December 30, 2017. He officially announced his candidacy on January 9, 2018, and also joined the Alberta Party caucus.

== Electoral history ==
=== 2019 general election ===
2019 Alberta general election: Calgary-South East
Party	Candidate	Votes	%	±%
United Conservative	Matt Jones	12,860	61.21%	-0.48%
New Democratic	Heather Eddy	3,983	18.96%	-12.23%
Alberta Party	Rick Fraser	3,810	18.13%	–
Liberal	Leila Keith	224	1.07%	-4.46%
Alberta Independence	Richard Fontaine	134	0.64%	–
Total		21,011	–	–
Rejected, spoiled and declined		47	66	5
Eligible electors / turnout		29,578	71.21%	20.63%
United Conservative gain from Alberta Party		Swing		20.48%
Source(s) Source: "24 - Calgary-South East, 2019 Alberta general election". officialresults.elections.ab.ca. Elections Alberta. UCP change is based on combination of Progressive Conservative and Wildrose results from the 2015 Alberta general election.

2015 Alberta general election: Calgary-South East
Party	Candidate	Votes	%	±%
Progressive Conservative	Rick Fraser	7,663	32.48	-16.05
New Democratic	Mirical MacDonald	7,358	31.19	+27.92
Wildrose	Brandon Lunty	6,892	29.21	-13.87
Liberal	Gladwin Gill	1,304	5.53	+0.41
Green	Jordan Mac Isaac	374	1.59	–
Total		23,591	99.28	–
Rejected, spoiled and declined		170	0.72	+0.18
Turnout		23,761	50.69	+2.71
Eligible voters		46,871		
Progressive Conservative hold		Swing		-21.98
Source(s) Source: "2015 General Election Report" (PDF). Elections Alberta.

2012 Alberta general election: Calgary-South East
Party	Candidate	Votes	%
Progressive Conservative	Rick Fraser	7,161	48.53
Wildrose	Bill Jarvis	6,357	43.08
Liberal	Brad Carroll	755	5.12
New Democratic	Marta Warszynski	483	3.27
Total		14,756	99.47
Rejected, spoiled and declined		79	0.53
Turnout		14,835	47.99
Eligible voters		30,914	
Progressive Conservative pickup new district.			
Source(s) Source: "2012 Provincial General Election Report" (PDF). Elections Alberta.
