= Luanne Metz =

Canadian clinical neurologist and politician

Luanne Metz MLA

Member of the Legislative Assembly of Alberta for Calgary-Varsity
- Incumbent
- Assumed office May 29, 2023
- Preceded by: Jason Copping

Personal details
- Born: November 17, 1957 (age 68) Maple Creek, Saskatchewan
- Party: Alberta New Democratic Party
- Education: University of Calgary; University of Toronto
- Occupation: Physician, neurologist, and politician

Luanne Metz is a Canadian politician and clinical neurologist and researcher. She was elected member of the Legislative Assembly of Alberta for Calgary-Varsity in the 2023 Alberta general election.

She is known for her work in the field of multiple sclerosis (MS) and has been recognized globally as an expert in the field.

== Education and career ==
Metz received her MD from the University of Calgary in 1983. Metz then went on to study internal medicine at the University of Toronto. She completed her neurology residency at the University of Calgary and became a Fellow of the Royal College of Physicians and Surgeons of Canada in 1988. She completed a fellowship in multiple sclerosis and neuroimmunology in 1989.

Metz has been a faculty member of the Department of Clinical Neurosciences within the University of Calgary's Cumming School of Medicine and has held several positions within the department, as well as in Alberta Health Service, including MS Clinic director and Section Chief of Neurology, and research director. In 2020, Dr. Metz acted as the associate facility medical director for the Foothills Medical Centre. She is recognized for her work in developing the Calgary MS Clinic and for her development of a bench-to-bedside translational research program. She has conducted research on a variety of topics related to MS, including clinical trial design, the development of novel therapies, and the study of oral corticosteroids and vitamin D.

In 2020, Metz founded Eyes Forward Alberta, a political action committee to "fight back against what she considers an approaching move to privatize Alberta healthcare." Metz was also the neurology representative and academic representative for the Alberta Medical Association, and the founding president of the Canadian Network of MS Clinics.

== Recognition and awards ==
Metz has been recognized globally as an expert in MS and has published extensively on the topic. She has also received several grants for her research and has led over 50 industry-sponsored clinical trials. She has served on several international data and safety monitoring boards and has designed and completed her own investigator-initiated studies.

In 2015, she was awarded the Alberta Medal of Distinguished Service for her contributions to the medical profession and the people of Alberta. She was inducted as a Fellow of the Canadian Academy of Health Sciences in 2020, as well as a recipient of the Watanabe Distinguished Achievement award from the University of Calgary's Cumming School of Medicine in 1999, and the Calgary Women of Achievement award from YWCA Calgary in 2001.

== Political career ==
In December 2021, Metz announced that she would be running as the NDP candidate in the upcoming provincial election for the Calgary-Varsity district. She decided to run for office after becoming upset with the UCP's push to privatize healthcare. NDP Leader Rachel Notley and the three current members of the Calgary NDP Caucus attended a press conference announcing Metz's candidacy. In the election, she won the seat, defeating incumbent and former Minister of Health Jason Copping. As of June 21, 2024, she serves as the Official Opposition critic for Health.

== Electoral history ==
2023 Alberta general election: Calgary-Varsity
Party	Candidate	Votes	%	±%
New Democratic	Luanne Metz	13,449	58.27	+14.83
United Conservative	Jason Copping	9,377	40.63	-5.53
Wildrose Loyalty Coalition	Oaklan Davidsen	141	0.61	–
Solidarity Movement	Kent Liang	112	0.49	–
Total valid votes		23,079	98.96	–
Rejected and declined		243	1.04	
Turnout		23,322	70.65	
Eligible electors		33,010		
New Democratic gain from United Conservative		Swing		+10.18
Source(s) Source: Elections Alberta
