= Calgary-South East =

Provincial electoral district in Alberta, Canada

Coordinates: 50.88°N 113.94°W

Alberta electoral district
- Calgary-South East within the City of Calgary, 2017 boundaries

Provincial electoral district
- Legislature: Legislative Assembly of Alberta
MLA
Matt Jones
United Conservative
- District created: 1957
- District abolished: 1963
- District re-created: 2010
- First contested: 1959, 2012
- Last contested: 1959, 2023

Calgary-South East (previously styled Calgary South East) is a provincial electoral district in Calgary, Alberta. It has existed twice, first from 1959 to 1963, and then re-created in 2010. The district is mandated to return a single member to the Legislative Assembly of Alberta.

The current electoral district was created from a portion of Airdrie-Chestermere, Calgary-Hays and Calgary-Shaw. It contains the neighbourhoods of Auburn Bay, Cranston, Mahogany & Seton.

== History ==
The first provincial electoral district to use the name Calgary South East was created in the 1959 redistribution that saw the provincial ridings of Calgary and Edmonton broken up. This marked the transition to standardize elections back to the First Past the Post across the province. From 1926 to 1959 Calgary and Edmonton, elected members with Single Transferable Vote in super districts while rest of the province used single member riding's using an Alternate voting method with a 50% margin.

The district was quickly abolished in the 1963 boundary redistribution when it became part of the Calgary South electoral district.

A new electoral district was created in southeast Calgary in the 2010 boundary redistribution. The roots of the new district can be traced back to the old South East district through various changes to the electoral boundaries that have taken place since. The district was created primarily from Calgary-Hays and Calgary-Shaw and its boundaries were expanded into areas of the old Airdrie-Chestermere and Highwood electoral districts where the city of Calgary boundaries had expanded.

=== Boundary history ===
25 Calgary-South East 2010 boundaries
Bordering districts
North	East	West	South
Calgary-Fort, Calgary-Hays and Calgary-Shaw	Chestermere-Rocky View	Calgary-Lougheed and Highwood	Highwood
Legal description from the Statutes of Alberta 2010, Electoral Divisions Act.
Note:

Members of the Legislative Assembly for Calgary-South East
Assembly	Years	Member	Party
See Calgary 1921-1959
14th	1959-1963	Arthur Dixon	Social Credit
See Calgary South 1963-1971
See Calgary-Hays 2004-2012, Calgary-Shaw 1986-2012, Foothills-Rocky View, Highwood and Airdrie-Chestermere
28th	2012–2015	Rick Fraser	Progressive; Conservative
29th	2015–2017	Rick Fraser	Progressive; Conservative
29th	2017	Rick Fraser	United Conservative
29th	2017-2018	Rick Fraser	Independent
29th	2018-2019	Rick Fraser	Alberta Party
30th	2019–2023	Matt Jones	United Conservative
31st	2023–present	Matt Jones	United Conservative

=== Electoral history ===
The first incarnation of Calgary South East saw Social Credit MLA Art Dixon win his third term in office with a landslide majority. He defeated two city of Calgary alderman to keep his seat in the Assembly. Dixon won the new district of Calgary South after South East was abolished in 1963.

Recently the area that comprises the new Calgary-South East has returned Progressive Conservative candidates with large majorities and has done so since the 1970s. The incumbent for Calgary-Hays during the 2010 boundary shift was Art Johnston. He tried to run for renomination but was defeated by Progressive Conservative candidate Rick Fraser and won't stand for re-election.

Shortly after the Progressive Conservatives merged with Wildrose in 2017, Fraser announced he would sit as an independent. In January 2018 he announced he would run for the leadership of the Alberta Party, but has yet to inform the Speaker whether he intends to join the party caucus.

== Legislative election results ==
=== 2023 ===
2023 Alberta general election
Party	Candidate	Votes	%	±%
United Conservative	Matt Jones	14,087	58.82	-2.39
New Democratic	Justin Huseby	9,442	39.42	+20.47
Green	Catriona Wright	318	1.33	–
Solidarity Movement	Heinrich Friesen	104	0.43	–
Total		23,951	99.39	–
Rejected and declined		146	0.61	
Turnout		24,097	62.81	
Eligible voters		38,368		
United Conservative hold		Swing		-11.43
Source(s) Source: Elections Alberta

=== 2019 ===
2019 Alberta general election
Party	Candidate	Votes	%	±%
United Conservative	Matt Jones	12,860	61.21%	-0.48%
New Democratic	Heather Eddy	3,983	18.96%	-12.23%
Alberta Party	Rick Fraser	3,810	18.13%	–
Liberal	Leila Keith	224	1.07%	-4.46%
Alberta Independence	Richard Fontaine	134	0.64%	–
Total		21,011	–	–
Rejected, spoiled and declined		47	66	5
Eligible electors / turnout		29,578	71.21%	20.63%
United Conservative gain from Alberta Party		Swing		20.48%
Source(s) Source: "24 - Calgary-South East, 2019 Alberta general election". officialresults.elections.ab.ca. Elections Alberta. UCP change is based on combination of Progressive Conservative and Wildrose results from the 2015 Alberta general election.

=== 2015 ===
2015 Alberta general election
Party	Candidate	Votes	%	±%
Progressive Conservative	Rick Fraser	7,663	32.48%	-16.05%
New Democratic	Mirical MacDonald	7,358	31.19%	27.92%
Wildrose	Brandon Lunty	6,892	29.21%	-13.87%
Liberal	Gladwin Gill	1,304	5.53%	0.41%
Green	Jordan Mac Isaac	374	1.59%	–
Total		23,591	–	–
Rejected, spoiled and declined		103	52	15
Eligible electors / turnout		46,871	50.58%	2.72%
Progressive Conservative hold		Swing		-2.08%
Source(s) Source: "25 - Calgary-South East, 2015 Alberta general election". officialresults.elections.ab.ca. Elections Alberta.

=== 2012 ===
2012 Alberta general election
Party	Candidate	Votes	%	±%
Progressive Conservative	Rick Fraser	7,161	48.53%	–
Wildrose	Bill Jarvis	6,357	43.08%	–
Liberal	Brad Carroll	755	5.12%	–
New Democratic	Marta Warszynski	483	3.27%	–
Total		14,756	–	–
Rejected, spoiled and declined		37	38	4
Eligible electors / turnout		30,914	47.87%	–
Progressive Conservative pickup new district.				
Source(s) Source: "25 - Calgary-South East, 2012 Alberta general election". officialresults.elections.ab.ca. Elections Alberta.

=== 1959 ===
1959 Alberta general election
Party	Candidate	Votes	%	±%
Social Credit	Arthur J. Dixon	5,643	67.11%	–
Progressive Conservative	Ernest Henry Starr	1,537	18.28%	–
Liberal	Peter Petrasuk	792	9.42%	–
Co-operative Commonwealth	George E. Ellinson	437	5.20%	–
Total		8,409	–	–
Rejected, spoiled and declined		53	–	–
Eligible electors / Turnout		17,299	48.92%	–
Social Credit pickup new district.				
Source(s) Source: "Calgary-South East Official Results 1959 Alberta general election". Alberta Heritage Community Foundation.

== Student vote results ==
=== 2012 ===
2012 Alberta student vote results
Affiliation	Candidate	Votes	%
Progressive Conservative	Rick Fraser		%
Wildrose	Bill Jarvis		
Liberal			%
NDP			%
Total			100%

== See also ==
- List of Alberta provincial electoral districts
- Canadian provincial electoral districts
