= 2018 Alberta Party leadership election =

- February 27, 2018
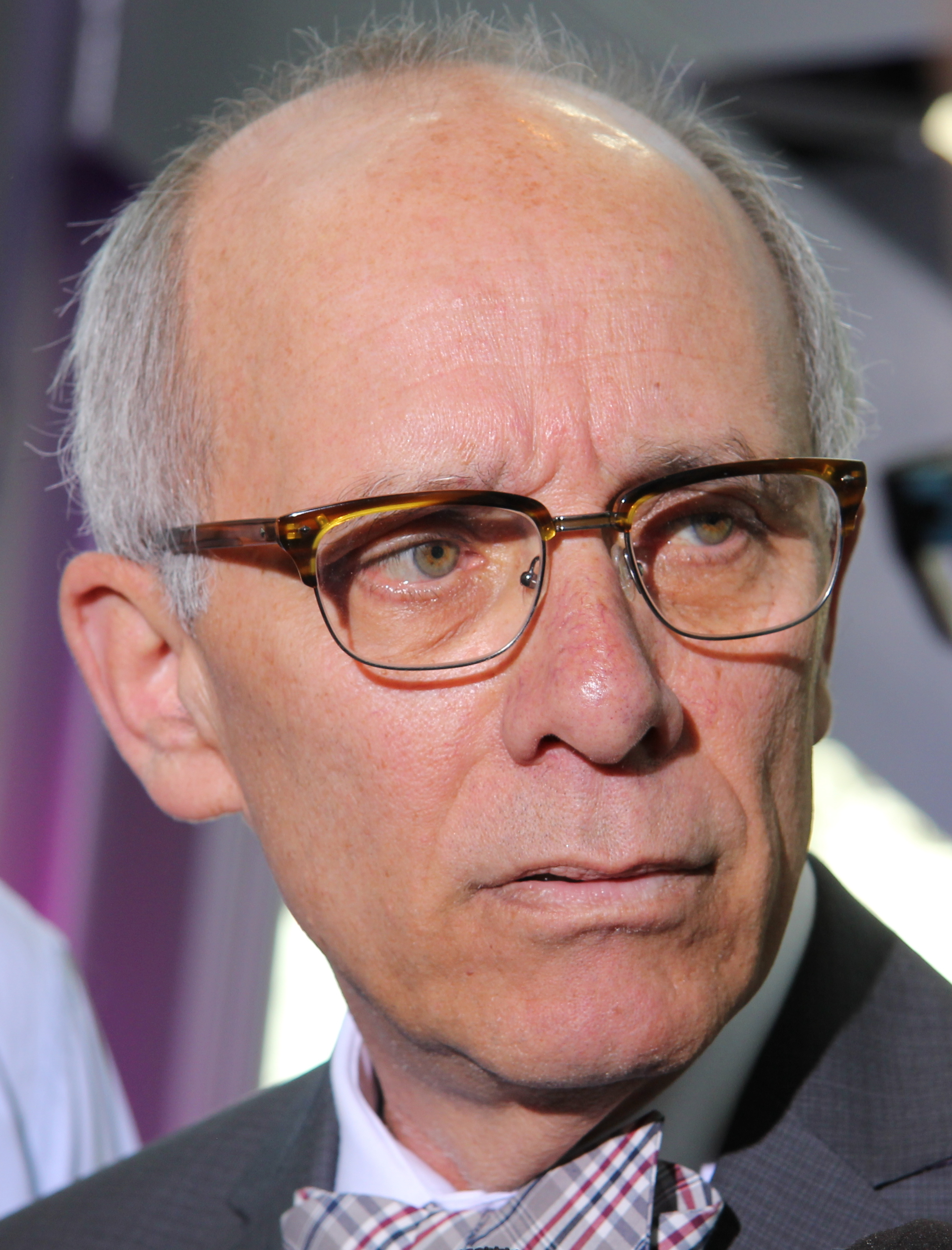
Candidate	Stephen Mandel	Kara Levis	Rick Fraser
Votes	3,046	838	729
Percentage	66.0%	18.2%	15.8%
Leader before election
Greg Clark
Elected Leader
Stephen Mandel

2018 Alberta Party leadership election
- Date: February 27, 2018
- Convention: Oasis Centre, Edmonton
- Resigning leader: Greg Clark
- Won by: Stephen Mandel
- Candidates: 3
- Entrance fee: $10,000

The 2018 Alberta Party leadership election occurred on February 27, 2018. It was triggered when outgoing Alberta Party leader Greg Clark announced on November 18, 2017, that he would be resigning as soon as his successor was chosen. According to published reports, Clark was pushed out by the party's board of directors as a result of a surge of former Progressive Conservatives joining the party following the PC party's merger into the United Conservative Party. While Clark initially stated that he was considering standing again for the leadership, he announced on December 14, 2017, that he would not be a candidate. The election was then set to be held on February 27, 2018, after originally being scheduled for February 7.

There was a $10,000 entry fee, $5,000 of which was a refundable performance bond.

The election was conducted using a one member one vote preferential ballot.

== Timeline ==
- November 18, 2017: Greg Clark announced his resignation so that there can be a leadership election.
- December 14, 2017: Clark announces he will not be a candidate.
- December 18, 2017: Kara Levis announces her candidacy.
- December 30, 2017: Rick Fraser registers his candidacy.
- January 10, 2018: Stephen Mandel announces his candidacy.
- January 15, 2018, 5 pm: Candidate nomination deadline.
- January 24, 2018: Leadership debate held in Edmonton.
- February 8, 2018: Leadership debate held in Calgary.
- February 12, 2018, noon: Membership deadline.
- February 25, 2018, noon: Voting period begins.
- February 27, 2018:
  - noon - Voting period ends.
  - 5 pm - Results announced at the Oasis Centre in Edmonton.

== Candidates ==
- Rick Fraser, MLA for Calgary-South East (2012–2019) and former Progressive Conservative and United Conservative who resigned from the UCP caucus in September 2017 to sit as an independent. Fraser registered his candidacy on December 30, 2017, and officially announced his candidacy and joined the Alberta Party caucus on January 9, 2018.
- Kara Levis, a Calgary energy lawyer, announced her candidacy for the leadership on December 18, 2017.
- Stephen Mandel, former three-term Mayor of Edmonton (2004–2013), former Progressive Conservative MLA for Edmonton-Whitemud (2014–2015), and former Minister of Health in the Alberta Government (2014–2015), announced his candidacy on January 10, 2018.

=== Declined ===
- Greg Clark, the incumbent leader (2013–2019) and MLA for Calgary-Elbow (2015–present).
- Jacob Huffman, a University of Calgary student who was previously active with the Alberta Liberals, registered his candidacy on December 5, 2017. Although Huffman registered his candidacy, he did not submit the package in time to qualify for the race.
- Karen McPherson, MLA for Calgary-Mackay-Nose Hill (2015–2019), elected as an NDP MLA, crossed the floor and joined the Alberta Party caucus in 2017.

== Results ==
Candidate	Votes	Percentage
Stephen Mandel	3,046	66.03%
Kara Levis	838	18.17%
Rick Fraser	729	15.80%
Total	4,613	100%
