= Muriel Abdurahman =

Canadian politician

Member of the Legislative Assembly of Alberta
- In office 1993–1997
- Succeeded by: Rob Lougheed
- Constituency: Clover Bar-Fort Saskatchewan

Mayor of Fort Saskatchewan
- In office 1980–1986
- Succeeded by: Pryce Alderson

Personal details
- Born: Muriel Ross; April 29, 1938 Lochmaben, Scotland
- Died: December 22, 2013 (aged 75) Edmonton, Alberta, Canada
- Citizenship: Canada, United Kingdom
- Party: Progressive Conservative Association of Alberta (1977-1992); Alberta Liberal Party (1992-1997)
- Spouse: Abdul Abdurahman

Muriel Ross Abdurahman (April 29, 1938 – December 22, 2013) was a nurse and politician best known for her political career in Alberta, Canada. The first woman to hold the office of Mayor of Fort Saskatchewan, she later served in the Legislative Assembly of Alberta.

== Life before Fort Saskatchewan ==
Muriel Ross was born April 29, 1938, in Lochmaben, Scotland, to parents Catherine Wilson and Andrew Ross. Her family owned a dairy farm near Lockerbie, where she grew up.

Aged sixteen, she entered training as a fevers nurse. She then practiced at the City of Glasgow Fever and Smallpox Hospitals (Belvidere) network, where she met her future husband, doctor Abdul Abdurahman. Abdul's father was Abdullah Abdurahman, a South African physician and politician who led the anti-segregationist African Political Organization.

Muriel and Abdul eloped, and, in 1957, moved to Guyana, where Abdul worked for the British Foreign Office to treat patients with leprosy. The couples' first daughter, Amanda, was born there; the Abdurahmans also celebrated a second wedding. After four years, the family returned to the United Kingdom, where they had their next three children: Ross, Lucinda and Vanessa.

In 1968, the family emigrated to Canada. They lived in Breton for a period, then relocated to Fort Saskatchewan in 1971. During the 1970s, Abdurahman took a course in Canadian Studies at Grant MacEwan Community College (now MacEwan University), became a Canadian citizen, and became a member of the Alberta Progressive Conservative party.

== Municipal politics ==
=== Fort Saskatchewan Councillor and Mayoral run: 1977-1980 ===
Abdurahman was elected to Fort Saskatchewan town council in October 1977. During her time as a councillor, Abdurahman was a vocal supporter of public libraries, and introduced an unsuccessful bylaw to ban snowmobiles from being used within city limits. Abdurahman also devised a civic half-day to mark Queen Elizabeth II's visit to Fort Saskatchewan in 1978. The community hosted a festival and picnic to greet the visiting delegation.

In 1980, Abdurahman ran to be Fort Saskatchewan's Mayor. Her sole opponent was former councillor Marjorie Middagh, who in 1977 had run against outgoing Mayor Hank Powell. That the race involved two women generated some media attention, as the victor would be the first woman to serve as Fort Saskatchewan's mayor.

Abdurahman won the October election by 1,375 votes to Middagh's 1,196. In comments to the Edmonton Journal, Middagh alleged that Abdurahman had mounted a "vicious" campaign against her; however, Middagh "refused" to elaborate when asked. Abdurahman, meanwhile, said that she was "quite happy" with the way her campaign was run. Later, Abdurahman told the Journal that she had faced prejudice from male voters, who told her: "It's useless voting for mayor this time. Both candidates are women." She recalled feeling "insulted," but felt that women had been largely supportive of her bid.

=== Terms as Mayor: 1980-1986 ===
In her inaugural address as Mayor, Abdurahman described her priorities as being upgrading local transportation, constructing an indoor swimming pool, and investigating the feasibility of a public school system for Fort Saskatchewan.

During her terms as Mayor, Fort Saskatchewan debated becoming a city and the future of its school system. Indeed, one of the first acts by Fort Saskatchewan's 1980 council was ordering an investigation into whether the town would enjoy any "financial benefits" by becoming a city. In late January, 1981, Abdurahman relayed the report's conclusion that there would be "no distinct monetary advantage" to becoming a city at that time. If a city, Fort Saskatchewan would be responsible for maintaining its highways, at an annual expense of around $82,400.

By early 1983, Abdurahman had changed her mind and was supporting seeking city status for Fort Saskatchewan. Noting that provincial transportation grants were now favourable to the town, she supported the move. However, at that time, cities were required to maintain their own school board; schools in Fort Saskatchewan still fell under the County of Strathcona Board of Education. In February 1983, the council put a plebiscite to Fort Saskatchewan's residents asking whether they would support breaking from the County of Strathcona Board. 78% of voters said no, prompting Abdurahman to pause seeking city status in light of the results.

After an uncontested re-election bid, Abdurahman was acclaimed Mayor for a second term in October 1983. Soon afterwards, the provincial legislature amended legislation to allow cities to remain part of county school systems, eliminating the concerns voters had expressed via the February 1983 plebiscite. In January 1984, Abdurahman told the Edmonton Journal that she was urging the council to seriously discuss city status, feeling "the time [was] right" for Fort Saskatchewan to become a city. Fort Saskatchewan became a city on July 1, 1985. Fort Saskatchewan became Alberta's 15th city on July 1, 1985, with Abdurahman overseeing celebrations over the preceding weekend.

==== Environmental public health advocacy ====
Abdurahman was active in environmental health policy throughout her lifetime, particularly around how Albertan governments practiced waste management. Before entering politics, she contributed to a provincial investigation into improving hazardous waste management. As a municipal politician, she was critical of Edmonton's municipal government dumping raw sewage into the North Saskatchewan River, as this matter would flow into Fort Saskatchewan during periods of heavy rainfall. Journalist Don Thomas of the Edmonton Journal wrote that, although Abdurahman made "no secret" about her Progressive Conservative leanings, she wrote a strongly critical letter to Premier Peter Lougheed in July 1984, urging the provincial government to intervene in depolluting the river.

== Provincial politics ==
=== Provincial run and health sector work: 1986-1992 ===
Abdurahman resigned from her position as Mayor in April 1986 to run for the legislature in that year's Alberta general election. She ran in the electoral district of Clover Bar as a candidate for the Progressive Conservatives. She ultimately finished second to Walt Buck, incumbent Member of the Legislative Assembly (MLA) and member of the Representative Party.

After ruling out running for mayor again in Fort Saskatchewan's October 1986 election, Abdurahman returned to working in the health sector. She served as Chair of Alberta Hospital Edmonton between 1988 and 1992. Her decision to cut hospital beds at the facility for financial reasons attracted criticism by Michael Henry in 1991, who later became Abdurahman's colleague in the Legislative Assembly.

=== Member of the Legislative Assembly: 1993-1997 ===
Abdurahman ran as a Liberal candidate in the 1993 general election in the new electoral district of Clover Bar-Fort Saskatchewan, defeating incumbent independent MLA Kurt Gesell. She was one of 16 women in the Alberta Legislature at the time. During her term in the Legislature, Abdurahman served as the Liberals' Health Critic in 1994, Consumer Affairs Critic in 1995, and Finance Critic in 1996. She also served as vice-chair of the Public Health Advisory and Appeal Board and Chair of the Public Accounts Committee.

Despite her prior Conservative bid, Abdurahman opted to run for the Liberals due to her strong working relationship with party leader Laurence Decore. Abdurahman had met Decore while they were the respective Mayors of Fort Saskatchewan and Edmonton. Nonetheless, the Calgary Herald alleged that, by April 1994, Abdurahman was one of a group of MLAs who met to share grievances with Decore's leadership in secret. When Decore resigned in July, the Herald reported that media coverage of these alleged meetings had been a factor in his decision to leave office. In public remarks, Abdurahman was more favourable to Decore, stating that she believed he had needed time to recover from the "political loss" of the Liberals failing to obtain a majority in 1993. She decided against entering the leadership race to replace him, feeling that her Scottish accent and gender were obstacles to winning.

Abdurahman was a vocal critic of the Ralph Klein administration's financial policies. The1994 provincial budget involved broad public spending cuts to health, education, and the public sector, which Abdurahman perceived as likely to result in disproportionate job losses for women. Challenging Klein during a Question Period in March, Abdurahman accused his government of balancing the budget at the "expense of women"; Klein responded by pointing out that his caucus contained several women MLAs. Later that year, a private member's bill put forward by Abdurahman to hold Klein's administration to a promise to review MLA compensation was voted down.

Abdurahman believed racism was "pervasive" in Alberta. She described her husband and children facing discrimination due to their Cape Coloured heritage. In March 1994, Abdurahman herself was part of a related political controversy after Dianne Mirosh reportedly mocked Abdurahman's last name and accent by suggesting they were unintelligible. Abdurahman sought a public apology from Mirosh, which Mirosh declined to offer.

=== Provincial re-election bid: 1997 ===
In her bid for re-election during the 1997 Alberta general election, Abdurahman earned a greater share of the popular vote than in 1993, but was defeated by Progressive Conservative candidate Rob Lougheed.

== After politics ==
Following her 1997 electoral defeat, Abdurahman retired from politics. She served as a member of the Alberta Press Council, Strathcona Library Board, and County of Strathcona Youth Justice Committee. During her four years as a member of the Library Board, Abdurahman oversaw the library moving to a permanent location, and led a campaign to raise $1.5 million for books and furnishings.

In 2001, Abdurahman was made a member of the Premier's Advisory Council on Health, convened by Ralph Klein to "find ways to reduce the cost of the health care system." She contributed to the final Mazankowski report.

== Personal life and death ==
Abdurahman's husband, Abdul, worked as a family doctor in Fort Saskatchewan until he was forced to retire due to illness. The family moved to Sherwood Park in 2000, in order to reduce their daily commute to Abdul's medical appointments.

After a long illness, Muriel Abdurahman died on December 22, 2013, aged 75. Political figures who offered public condolences included Karen Leibovici, Dave Quest, Jacquie Fenske, and Iris Evans. A moment of silence was held for Abdurahman in the Alberta Legislature on March 4, 2014.

=== Legacy ===
In 2023, the City of Fort Saskatchewan partnered with the Government of Alberta and Heartland Housing Foundation to open Muriel Ross Abdurahman Court, a housing facility for low-income seniors and families, named in Abdurahman's honour. As of 2024, Strathcona County Library maintains an annual Muriel Abdurahman Volunteer Award to recognize notable volunteers who assist the library.

Legislative Assembly of Alberta
Preceded by New District	MLA Clover Bar-Fort Saskatchewan; 1993-1997	Succeeded by Rob Lougheed
