= Strathcona (provincial electoral district) =

Defunct provincial electoral district in Alberta, Canada

Coordinates: 53.58°N 113.10°W

Edmonton-Strathcona
Alberta electoral district
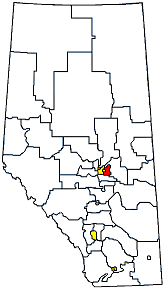
- 2004 boundaries

Defunct provincial electoral district
- Legislature: Legislative Assembly of Alberta
- District created: 1905
- District abolished: 1913
- District re-created: 2004
- District re-abolished: 2012
- First contested: 1905
- Last contested: 2008

Strathcona was a provincial electoral district in Alberta, Canada, mandated to return a single member to the Legislative Assembly of Alberta using the first past the post method of voting from 1905 to 1913 and again from 2004 to 2012.

It was renamed Edmonton South in 1917 and subsumed in a city-wide multiple-member district of Edmonton from 1921 to 1956. From 1959 to 1967 Strathcona Centre covered much of the old Strathcona district, with two or three other districts also bearing the Strathcona prefix.

Later it took on the name Edmonton-Strathcona. The name Strathcona is now applied to the Strathcona County area outside the Edmonton corporate electoral district.

== History ==
Strathcona
| Assembly | Years | Member | Party |
|---|---|---|---|
Riding created from Strathcona Centre and Strathcona West
| 1st | 1905–1909 | Alexander Cameron Rutherford | Liberal |
| 2nd | 1909–1913 | Alexander Cameron Rutherford | Liberal |
Riding dissolved into Camrose, Edmonton-South and Vegreville
Riding re-established from Clover Bar-Fort Saskatchewan and Redwater
| 26th | 2004–2008 | Rob Lougheed | Progressive Conservative |
| 27th | 2008–2012 | Dave Quest | Progressive Conservative |
Riding re-dissolved into Fort Saskatchewan-Vegreville and Strathcona-Sherwood Park

The constituency of Strathcona existed on two occasions in Alberta's history. The Strathcona electoral district was one of the original 25 electoral districts contested in the 1905 Alberta general election upon Alberta joining Confederation in September 1905. The district was carried over from the old Strathcona electoral district which returned a single member to the Legislative Assembly of the Northwest Territories from 1902 to 1905. During this time, the constituency centred on the City of Strathcona which was amalgamated into the City of Edmonton in 1912. The constituency was abolished prior to the 1913 Alberta general election, and the territory was split between Vegreville, Camrose and Edmonton South. Alexander Rutherford the incumbent from the Northwest Territories Legislative Assembly and first Premier of Alberta was elected as the representative for Strathcona in the 1905 Alberta general election and 1909 Alberta general election.

The Edmonton-Strathcona constituency, of the 1971 to the present period, was re-created in roughly the same place as the 1905-1909 version, in what had formerly (1959–1967) been Strathcona Centre.

A constituency using just the name Strathcona was created in 2004 when it was carved out of the south portion of Redwater and a large chunk of north west Clover Bar-Fort Saskatchewan.

The riding is one of five that used a name from the original twenty five 1905 ridings. The other four are St. Albert, Peace River, Stony Plain and Medicine Hat.

The constituency of Strathcona was sometimes confused with Edmonton-Strathcona so was renamed Strathcona-Sherwood Park. The constituency of Strathcona (2004–2012) bordered the east of Edmonton and was mixed rural, semi-rural and suburban, covering Strathcona County.

Fort Saskatchewan-Vegreville bordered the riding to the north and east. Leduc-Beaumont-Devon bordered the riding to the south. Sherwood Park, Edmonton-Ellerslie, Edmonton-Mill Creek, Edmonton-Beverly-Clareview and Edmonton-Manning bordered to the west.

=== Boundary history ===
78 Strathcona 2003 boundaries
Bordering districts
| North | East | West | South |
|---|---|---|---|
| Fort Saskatchewan-Vegreville | Fort Saskatchewan-Vegreville | Edmonton-Ellerslie, Edmonton-Mill Creek, Edmonton-Mill Woods, Leduc-Beaumont-Devon, Sherwood Park | Leduc-Beaumont-Devon |
| riding map goes here | | map in relation to other districts in Alberta goes here | |
Legal description from Electoral Divisions Act, S.A. 2003, c. E-4.1
Starting at the intersection of the right bank of the North Saskatchewan River and the south city boundary of Fort Saskatchewan; then 1. generally in a north easterly direction along the east city boundary of Fort Saskatchewan to the intersection with Highway 15; 2. in an easterly direction along Highway 15 to the east boundary of Sec. 20, Twp. 55, Rge. 20 W4; 3. south along the east boundary of Secs. 20, 17, 8 and 5 in the Twp. to the north boundary of Twp. 54, Rge. 20 W4; 4. east along the north boundary to the west boundary of Elk Island National Park; 5. in a southwesterly direction along the west boundary of Elk Island National Park to the northeast boundary of Sec. 25, Twp. 52, Rge. 21 W4; 6. south along the east boundary of Secs. 25, 24 and 13 to the north boundary of Sec. 7 in Twp. 52, Rge. 20 W4; 7. east along the north boundary of Secs. 7 and 8 to the east boundary of Sec. 8; 8. south along the east boundary of Sec. 8 to the north boundary of Sec. 4; 9. east along the north boundary of Sec. 4 to the east boundary of Sec. 4; 10. south along the east boundary of Sec. 4 to the north boundary of the south half of Sec. 3; 11. east along the north boundary of the south half of Sec. 3 to the east boundary of Sec. 3; 12. south along the east boundary of Sec. 3 in the Twp. and the east boundary of Secs. 34, 27 and 22 in Twp. 51, Rge. 20 W4 to the north boundary of Sec. 14; 13. east along the north boundary of Sec. 14 to the east boundary of the west half of Sec. 14; 14. south along the east boundary of the west half of Secs. 14, 11 and 2 to the north boundary of Twp. 50; 15. west along the north boundary of Twp. 50 to the east boundary of Sec. 34 in Twp. 50, Rge. 21 W4; 16. south along the east boundary of Sec. 34 to the north shore of Ministik Lake; 17. in a westerly direction along the north shore of Ministik Lake to the east boundary of Sec. 31 in Twp. 50, Rge. 21 W4; 18. north along the east boundary of Sec. 31 to the north boundary of Twp. 50, Rge. 21 W4; 19. west along the north boundary of Twp. 50 to the east boundary of Sec. 5 in Twp. 51, Rge. 23 W4; 20. north along the east boundary of Secs. 5 and 8 to the east Edmonton city boundary; 21. north along the east city boundary to Wye Road (Highway 630); 22. east along Wye Road to Clover Bar Road; 23. north along Clover Bar Road to Highway 16; 24. west along Highway 16 to the east Edmonton city boundary; 25. north along the east city boundary and the right bank of the North Saskatchewan River to the starting point.

== Legislative election results ==
=== 1905 ===
1905 Alberta general election
| Party | Candidate | Votes | % | ±% |
|---|---|---|---|---|
| Liberal | Alexander Cameron Rutherford | 625 | 67.13% | – |
| Conservative | Frank W. Crang | 306 | 32.87% | – |
| Total | | 931 | – | – |
| Rejected, spoiled and declined | | N/A | – | – |
| Eligible electors / turnout | | 931 | 100.00% | – |
| Liberal pickup new district. | | | | |
Source(s) Source: "Strathcona Official Results 1905 Alberta general election". Alberta Heritage Community Foundation.

=== 1909 ===
1909 Alberta general election
| Party | Candidate | Votes | % | ±% |
|---|---|---|---|---|
| Liberal | Alexander Cameron Rutherford | 1,034 | 85.92% | – |
| Conservative | Rice Sheppard | 173 | 14.08% | – |
| Total | | 1207 | – | – |
| Rejected, spoiled and declined | | N/A | – | – |
| Eligible electors / turnout | | N/A | N/A | N/A |
| Liberal hold | | Swing | | 18.53% |
Source(s) Source: "Strathcona Official Results 1909 Alberta general election". Alberta Heritage Community Foundation.

=== 2004 ===
2004 Alberta general election
| Party | Candidate | Votes | % | ±% |
|---|---|---|---|---|
| Progressive Conservative | Rob Lougheed | 6,871 | 49.09% | – |
| Liberal | Jon Friel | 4,115 | 29.40% | – |
| New Democratic | Thomas Elchuk | 1,145 | 8.18% | – |
| Alberta Party | Bruce Stubbs | 773 | 5.52% | – |
| Alberta Alliance | Ryan Seto | 467 | 3.34% | – |
| Social Credit | Brian Rembowski | 329 | 2.35% | – |
| Separation | Roberta McDonald | 297 | 2.12% | – |
| Total | | 13,997 | – | – |
| Rejected, spoiled and declined | | 71 | – | – |
| Eligible electors / turnout | | 27,983 | 50.27% | – |
| Progressive Conservative pickup new district. | | | | |
Source(s) Source: "Strathcona Official Results 2004 Alberta general election". Alberta Heritage Community Foundation.

=== 2008 ===
2008 Alberta general election
| Party | Candidate | Votes | % | ±% |
|---|---|---|---|---|
| Progressive Conservative | Dave Quest | 9,951 | 66.19% | 17.10% |
| Liberal | Jon Friel | 2,995 | 19.92% | -9.48% |
| New Democratic | Denny Holmwood | 911 | 6.06% | -2.12% |
| Green | Kate Harrington | 763 | 5.07% | – |
| Social Credit | Gordon Barrett | 415 | 2.76% | 0.41% |
| Total | | 15,035 | – | – |
| Rejected, spoiled and declined | | 59 | – | – |
| Eligible electors / turnout | | 32,140 | 46.96% | -3.31% |
| Progressive Conservative hold | | Swing | | 13.29% |
Source(s) Source: "Elections Alberta 2008 General Election". Elections Alberta.

== Senate nominee election results ==
=== 2004 ===
| 2004 Senate nominee election results: Strathcona | | | | Turnout 44.17% | |
| Affiliation | Candidate | Votes | % votes | % ballots | Rank |
| Progressive Conservative | Betty Unger | 4,874 | 15.63% | 47.41% | 2 |
| Progressive Conservative | Bert Brown | 3,933 | 12.61% | 38.26% | 1 |
| Progressive Conservative | Cliff Breitkreuz | 3,887 | 12.47% | 37.81% | 3 |
| Independent | Link Byfield | 3,765 | 12.07% | 36.62% | 4 |
| Progressive Conservative | David Usherwood | 2,789 | 8.94% | 27.13% | 6 |
| Alberta Alliance | Michael Roth | 2,686 | 8.61% | 26.13% | 7 |
| Alberta Alliance | Vance Gough | 2,354 | 7.55% | 22.90% | 8 |
| Progressive Conservative | Jim Silye | 2,343 | 7.51% | 22.79% | 5 |
| Alberta Alliance | Gary Horan | 2,285 | 7.33% | 22.23% | 10 |
| Independent | Tom Sindlinger | 2,266 | 7.28% | 22.04% | 9 |
| Total votes | | 31,182 | 100% | | |
| Total ballots | | 10,281 | 3.03 votes per ballot | | |
| Rejected, spoiled and declined | | 2,080 | | | |

Voters had the option of selecting four candidates on the ballot

== 2004 student vote results ==
Participating schools
Ardossan Elementary
Ardrossan Junior Senior High School
Bev Facey Community High School
Ministik Elementary
St. Luke School
Strathcona Christian Academy

On November 19, 2004, a student vote was conducted at participating Alberta schools to parallel the 2004 Alberta general election results. The vote was designed to educate students and simulate the electoral process for persons who have not yet reached the legal majority. The vote was conducted in 80 of the 83 provincial electoral districts with students voting for actual election candidates. Schools with a large student body that reside in another electoral district had the option to vote for candidates outside of the electoral district then where they were physically located.

2004 Alberta student vote results
| Affiliation | Candidate | Votes | % |
| Progressive Conservative | Rob Lougheed | 479 | 33.33% |
| Liberal | Jon Friel | 238 | 16.56% |
| Separation | Roberta Mcdonald | 207 | 14.41% |
| Alberta Party | Bruce Stubbs | 171 | 11.90% |
| NDP | Tom Elchuck | 157 | 10.93% |
| Alberta Alliance | Ryan Ceto | 119 | 8.28% |
| Social Credit | Brian Rembowski | 66 | 4.59% |
| Total | | 1,437 | 100% |
| Rejected, spoiled and declined | | 144 | |

== See also ==
- List of Alberta provincial electoral districts
- Strathcona Federal electoral district
- Strathcona Northwest Territories territorial electoral district
