= Leduc-Beaumont =

Provincial electoral district in Alberta, Canada

Alberta electoral district
- Leduc-Beaumont within the Edmonton Metropolitan Region, 2017 boundaries

Provincial electoral district
- Legislature: Legislative Assembly of Alberta
MLA
Brandon Lunty
United Conservative
- District created: 2010
- First contested: 2012
- Last contested: 2023

Leduc-Beaumont is a provincial electoral district in Alberta, Canada. The district is one of 87 districts mandated to return a single member (MLA) to the Legislative Assembly of Alberta using the first past the post method of voting.

== History ==
The electoral district was created in the 2010 Alberta boundary re-distribution. It was named after the City of Leduc and Leduc County and the city of Beaumont. It was created from the old electoral district of Leduc-Beaumont-Devon which was abolished when the town of Devon was transferred into the new district of Drayton Valley-Devon. The other major change from the old riding was the move of land within Camrose County to Battle River-Wainwright. The Leduc-Beaumont district would have a population of 41,902 in 2010 which was 2.5% larger than the provincial average of 40,880.

The 2017 electoral boundaries re-distribution saw areas within the district annexed by the City of Edmonton be transferred to Edmonton constituencies, and the eastern border of this constituency was moved west to hug the eastern borders of the City of Beaumont, Nisku Industrial Park and the City of Leduc. The land to the east of the new border would be added to the riding of Maskwacis-Wetaskiwin. The district would have a population of 48,337 in 2017, which was 3% above the provincial average of 46,803.

=== Boundary history ===
67 Leduc-Beaumont 2010 boundaries
Bordering districts
North	East	West	South
Edmonton-Ellerslie, Edmonton-South West and Strathcona-Sherwood Park	Battle River-Wainwright	Drayton Valley-Devon and Stony Plain	Wetaskiwin-Camrose
Legal description from the Statutes of Alberta 2010, Electoral Divisions Act

Members of the Legislative Assembly for Leduc-Beaumont
Assembly	Years	Member	Party
See Leduc-Beaumont-Devon 2004–2012
28th	2012–2015	George Rogers	Progressive Conservative
29th	2015–2019	Shaye Anderson	New Democratic
30th	2019–2023	Brad Rutherford	United Conservative
31st	2023–present	Brandon Lunty	United Conservative

=== Representation history ===
The electoral district and its antecedent have elected Progressive Conservative MLAs with solid majorities going back to the 1970s. In the 2015 general election, NDP candidate Shaye Anderson was elected, defeating Wildrose candidate Sharon Smith and incumbent George Rodgers. Anderson was appointed Minister of Municipal Affairs in Rachel Notley's cabinet.

Anderson was defeated in the 2019 general election by UCP candidate Brad Rutherford by 7,731 votes.

== Legislative election results ==
=== 2012 ===
2012 Alberta general election
Party	Candidate	Votes	%	±%
Progressive Conservative	George A. Rogers	8,420	51.29%	–
Wildrose	David Stasiewich	5,228	31.84%	–
New Democratic	Hana Razga	1,391	8.47%	–
Liberal	Jasen Maminski	727	4.43%	–
Alberta Party	William Munsey	453	2.76%	–
Evergreen	Jennifer R. Roach	199	1.21%	–
Total		16,418	–	–
Rejected, spoiled, and declined		98	–	–
Eligible electors / turnout		31,534	52.38%	–
Progressive Conservative pickup new district.				
Source(s) Source: "67 - Leduc-Beaumont, 2012 Alberta general election". officialresults.elections.ab.ca. Elections Alberta.

=== 2015 ===
2015 Alberta general election
Party	Candidate	Votes	%	±%
New Democratic	Shaye Anderson	8,321	37.82%	29.35%
Wildrose	Sharon Smith	6,543	29.74%	-2.10%
Progressive Conservative	George A. Rogers	6,225	28.29%	-22.99%
Alberta Party	Bert Hoogewoonink	612	2.78%	0.02%
Green	Josh Drozda	301	1.37%	0.16%
Total		22,002	–	–
Rejected, spoiled and declined		81	–	–
Eligible electors / turnout		37,889	58.28%	5.91%
New Democratic gain from Progressive Conservative		Swing		-5.68%
Source(s) Source: "67 - Leduc-Beaumont, 2015 Alberta general election". officialresults.elections.ab.ca. Elections Alberta.

2015 Alberta general election redistributed results
Party	Votes	%
New Democratic	7,299	40.10
Progressive Conservative	5,079	27.91
Wildrose	5,060	27.80
Alberta Party	506	2.78
Green	257	1.41
Source(s) Source: Ridingbuilder

=== 2019 ===
2019 Alberta general election
Party	Candidate	Votes	%	±%
United Conservative	Brad Rutherford	14,982	58.40	+2.70
New Democratic	Shaye Anderson	7,251	28.27	-11.84
Alberta Party	Robb Connelly	2,206	8.60	+5.82
Alberta Advantage Party	Gil Poitras	304	1.19	–
Freedom Conservative	Jeff Rout	258	1.01	–
Liberal	Chris Fenske	212	0.83	–
Green	Jennifer R. Roach	203	0.79	-0.62
Alberta Independence	Kevin Dunn	165	0.64	–
Independent	Sharon Maclise	71	0.28	–
Total		25,652	99.05	–
Rejected, spoiled and declined		247	0.95	–
Turnout		25,899	72.54	
Eligible electors		35,705		
United Conservative gain from New Democratic		Swing		+7.27
Source(s) Source: "69 - Leduc-Beaumont, 2019 Alberta general election". officialresults.elections.ab.ca. Elections Alberta.

=== 2023 ===
2023 Alberta general election
Party	Candidate	Votes	%	±%
United Conservative	Brandon Lunty	14,118	56.74	-1.66
New Democratic	Cam Heenan	10,069	40.47	+12.20
Independent	Kirk Cayer	292	1.17	–
Alberta Independence	Sharon Maclise	257	1.03	+0.39
Solidarity Movement	Bill Kaufmann	144	0.58	–
Total		24,880	99.34	–
Rejected and declined		166	0.66	
Turnout		25,046	62.51	
Eligible voters		40,070		
United Conservative hold		Swing		-6.93
Source(s) Source: Elections Alberta

== Student vote results ==
=== 2012 ===
2012 Alberta student vote results
Affiliation	Candidate	Votes	%
Progressive Conservative	George Rogers		%
Wildrose	Dave Stasiewich		%
Liberal	Jasen Maminski		%
Alberta Party	William Munsey		%
New Democratic	Hana Razga		%
Total			100%

== See also ==
- List of Alberta provincial electoral districts
- Canadian provincial electoral districts
