= Estefan Cortes-Vargas =

Alberta politician

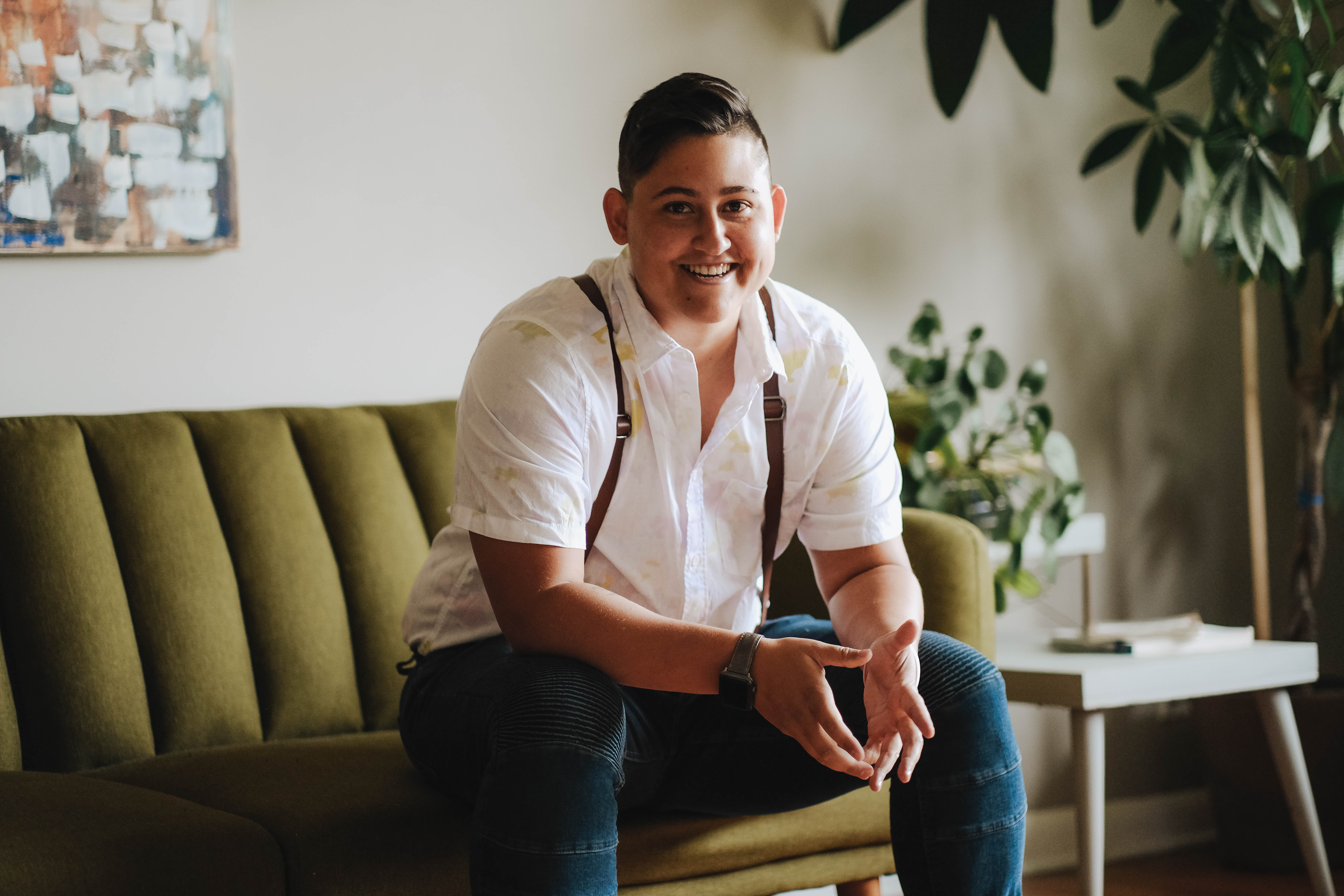
- Cortes-Vargas in 2015

Member of the Legislative Assembly of Alberta for Strathcona-Sherwood Park
- In office May 5, 2015 – March 19, 2019
- Preceded by: Dave Quest
- Succeeded by: Nate Glubish

Personal details
- Born: 1990 or 1991 (age 34–35) Colombia
- Party: Alberta New Democratic Party
- Occupation: Non-Profit Administrator

Estefan Cortes-Vargas (born Estefania Cortes-Vargas, 1991) is a Colombian-born Canadian politician and non-profit administrator who was elected in the 2015 Alberta general election to the Legislative Assembly of Alberta, representing the electoral district of Strathcona-Sherwood Park as a member of the Alberta New Democratic Party. Upon election, they became one of the first three out LGBT people elected to the Alberta legislature, alongside caucus colleagues Michael Connolly and Ricardo Miranda. They were also the first openly trans, non-binary, queer MLA in Canada, as well as the first Colombian-Canadian MLA and the youngest government whip in Alberta at the age of 24, marking a series of historical firsts in Canadian politics.

== Election and media coverage ==
Although Cortes-Vargas was initially represented in media coverage during the election campaign as female and lesbian, in December 2015, they formally came out as non-binary during their term in the legislature. This announcement coincided with their role as a co-sponsor of a bill and their participation in the debate on the inclusion of transgender rights in the provincial human rights code. While the provincial Hansard, which traditionally reports members' speeches under the gender honorifics "Mr." or "Ms.", adapted to this change by referring to Cortes-Vargas as "Member Cortes-Vargas". This change marked the Alberta Legislature as the first in Canada to include non-gendered honorifics, reflecting a significant shift in legislative practices towards inclusivity.

== Trade and business advocacy ==
Estefan Cortes-Vargas has been an active advocate for international trade and business development. As the Chair of the Canada-US relations committee in 2017-18 within the Council of State Governments, they played a significant role in fostering cross-border trade relations. Their efforts were particularly focused on enhancing economic ties and supporting local business initiatives. Estefan's work in this role also involved close collaboration with local chambers of commerce, contributing to the support and growth of business start-ups. This period marked a significant contribution to international trade dialogue and local economic development. They chose not to run in the 2019 Alberta general election.

== Organisational affiliations ==
In 2019, Cortes-Vargas was named executive director of the Pride Centre of Edmonton. They remained in that role until July 2020. They have been the vice-president of the Enchanté Network, which is a coalition of 2SLGBTQ+ community organizations across Canada, since 2020. In September 2022, they started their studies to become a lawyer at the University of Saskatchewan College of Law in Saskatoon and graduated with a certificate in business in 2022. In 2023, Estefan Cortes-Vargas was the recipient of the Signature Research Area Award for their work on "Trans Equity for E-Health" at the University of Saskatchewan's Undergraduate Symposium, showcasing their commitment to health equity within the 2SLGBTQ+ community.

== Electoral history ==
=== 2015 general election ===
2015 Alberta general election: Strathcona-Sherwood Park
| Party | Candidate | Votes | % | ±% |
|---|---|---|---|---|
| New Democratic | Estefania Cortes-Vargas | 9,376 | 42.61% | 34.10% |
| Progressive Conservative | Dave Quest | 6,623 | 30.10% | -20.62% |
| Wildrose | Rob Johnson | 5,286 | 24.02% | -9.62% |
| Alberta Party | Lynne Kaiser | 721 | 3.28% | – |
| Total | | 22,006 | – | – |
| Rejected, spoiled and declined | | 50 | 38 | 22 |
| Eligible electors / turnout | | 34,346 | 64.28% | 4.55% |
| New Democratic gain from Progressive Conservative | | Swing | | +27.36% |
Source: "82 - Strathcona-Sherwood Park, 2015 Alberta general election". officialresults.elections.ab.ca. Elections Alberta. Chief Electoral Officer (2016). 2015 General Election. A Report of the Chief Electoral Officer (PDF) (Report). Edmonton, Alta.: Elections Alberta.
