= Jackie Armstrong-Homeniuk =

Canadian politician

Jackie Armstrong Homeniuk MLA
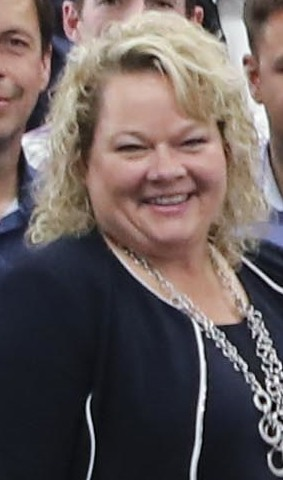

Member of the Legislative Assembly of Alberta for Fort Saskatchewan-Vegreville
- Incumbent
- Assumed office April 16, 2019
- Preceded by: Jessica Littlewood

Personal details
- Party: United Conservative Party

Jackie Armstrong-Homeniuk is a Canadian politician who was elected in the 2019 Alberta general election to represent the electoral district of Fort Saskatchewan-Vegreville in the 30th Alberta Legislature. She is a member the United Conservative Party and served as the Parliamentary Secretary for Ukrainian Refugee Settlement in October 24, 2022 and previously served as the Associate Minister of Status of Women in 2022.

== Career ==
Armstrong-Homeniuk introduced private member's bills Protection of Students with Life-threatening Allergies Act (Bill 201) which requires all publicly funded schools to have adrenalin autoinjectors (EpiPens) at the ready, should someone have an unexpected, life-threatening allergic reaction. Bill 201 received Royal Assent on June 28, 2019, and came into force on January 1, 2020.

Armstrong-Homeniuk has voted in favour of some controversial bills which led to a potential recall. For example, the October 2025 legislation (commonly referred to as Bill 2 – Back to School Act) forced teachers back to work and imposed a collective agreement over their objections. Many critics — including the Alberta Teachers' Association (ATA) and civil-liberties groups — condemned the use of the notwithstanding clause as an over-reach that undermines fundamental rights (freedom of association, to strike, etc.). Also, Bill 9 (Nov 2025) uses the notwithstanding clause to shield from court challenge previous laws passed in 2024 (e.g. the Health Statutes Amendment Act, 2024 (Bill 26), the Education Amendment Act, 2024 (Bill 27), and the Fairness and Safety in Sport Act (Bill 29) that restrict gender-affirming care for minors, require parental consent for students under 16 to change pronouns/names, and ban transgender girls from female sports. The clause prevents courts from striking these laws down, even if they violate Charter-based rights (e.g. equality, security of person.

== Electoral history ==
=== 2023 general election ===
2023 Alberta general election: Fort Saskatchewan-Vegreville
Party	Candidate	Votes	%	±%
United Conservative	Jackie Armstrong-Homeniuk	14,126	58.07	+4.44
New Democratic	Taneen Rudyk	9,064	37.26	+7.91
Independent	Kathy Flett	801	3.29	–
Advantage Party	Kelly Zeleny	227	0.93	+0.03
Solidarity Movement	Granny Margaret Mackay	108	0.44	–
Total		24,326	99.37	–
Rejected and declined		154	0.63	
Turnout		24,480	60.14	
Eligible voters		40,706		
United Conservative hold		Swing		-1.73
Source(s) Source: Elections Alberta

=== 2019 general election ===
2019 Alberta general election: Fort Saskatchewan-Vegreville
Party	Candidate	Votes	%	±%
United Conservative	Jackie Armstrong Homeniuk	14,233	53.63%	5.11%
New Democratic	Jessica Littlewood	7,790	29.35%	-16.59%
Alberta Party	Marvin Olsen	3,386	12.76%	11.10%
Freedom Conservative	Malcolm Stinson	350	1.32%	–
Green	Rebecca Trotter	278	1.05%	-0.41%
Alberta Independence	Shane Ladouceur	261	0.98%	–
Alberta Advantage Party	Ronald Malowany	241	0.91%	–
Total		26,539	–	–
Rejected, spoiled and declined		154	–	–
Eligible electors / turnout		37,931	70.37%	16.44%
United Conservative gain from New Democratic		Swing		3.30%
Source(s) Source: "62 - Fort Saskatchewan-Vegreville, 2019 Alberta general election". officialresults.elections.ab.ca. Elections Alberta.

== Personal life ==
Armstrong-Homeniuk is of Ukrainian descent. She has expressed support for the preservation of Canadian Ukrainian cultural heritage, including Vyshyvanka Day celebrations.
