= Rob Lougheed =

Canadian politician (born 1947)

Member of the Legislative Assembly of Alberta
- In office 1997–2008
- Preceded by: Muriel Abdurahman
- Succeeded by: Dave Quest
- Constituency: Clover Bar-Fort Saskatchewan (1997–2004); Strathcona (2004–2008)

Personal details
- Born: 1947 (age 78–79) Grande Prairie, Alberta
- Party: Progressive Conservative
- Education: University of Alberta
- Occupation: Teacher

Rob Lougheed (born 1947) is a politician from Alberta, Canada.

Lougheed was born in Grande Prairie in 1947 and attended the University of Alberta. He was elected to the Legislative Assembly of Alberta in the 1997 general election as the member for Clover Bar-Fort Saskatchewan. Running under the Progressive Conservative banner, he defeated incumbent Muriel Abdurahman of the Alberta Liberal Party. He was easily reelected to another term in 2001.

In the 2004 Alberta general election, Lougheed was re-elected in the new district of Strathcona. He retired from the Assembly at dissolution in 2008.
