= Leduc-Beaumont-Devon =

Defunct provincial electoral district in Alberta, Canada

Alberta electoral district
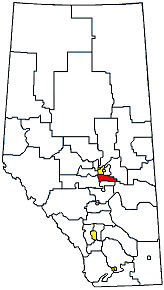
- 2004 boundaries

Defunct provincial electoral district
- Legislature: Legislative Assembly of Alberta
- District created: 2004
- District abolished: 2012
- First contested: 2004
- Last contested: 2008

Leduc-Beaumont-Devon was a provincial electoral district in Alberta, Canada, mandated to return a single member to the Legislative Assembly of Alberta using the first-past-the-post method of voting from 2004 to 2012.

The district and its antecedents have traditionally been a stronghold of votes for the Progressive Conservatives over the last few decades.

The district was created in the 2004 boundary re-distribution from the old Leduc electoral district. It was named after the city of Leduc and Leduc County as well as the towns of Beaumont and Devon. The district is mixed urban and rural as it also contains large rural portions.

== Leduc-Beaumont-Devon history ==
=== Boundary history ===
62 Leduc-Beaumont-Devon 2003 boundaries
Bordering districts
North	East	West	South
Edmonton-Ellerslie, Edmonton-Whitemud, Strathcona, Stony Plain	Fort Saskatchewan-Vegreville	Drayton Valley-Calmar	Battle River-Wainwright, Wetaskiwin-Camrose
riding map goes here		map in relation to other districts in Alberta goes here	
Legal description from the Statutes of Alberta 2003, Electoral Divisions Act.
Starting at the intersection of the right bank of the North Saskatchewan River and the south boundary of the Edmonton city boundary; then 1. east along the city boundary to the east boundary of Sec. 8, Twp. 51, Rge. 23 W4; 2. south along the east boundary of Secs. 8 and 5 in the Twp. to the north boundary of Twp. 50; 3. east along the north boundary to the east boundary of Sec. 31, Twp. 50, Rge. 21 W4; 4. south along the east boundary to the north boundary of Sec. 29 in the Twp.; 5. east along the north boundary to the east boundary of Sec. 29; 6. south along the east boundary to the north boundary of Sec. 21 in the Twp.; 7. east along the north boundary to the east boundary of Sec. 21; 8. south along the east boundary of Secs. 21, 16 and 9 to the north boundary of Sec. 3 in the Twp.; 9. east along the north boundary of Secs. 3, 2 and 1 in the Twp. and the north boundary of Secs. 6, 5, 4, 3, 2 and 1 in Twp. 50, Rge. 20 W4 to the east boundary of Rge. 20 W4; 10. south along the east boundary to the north boundary of Twp. 49; 11. east along the north boundary to the east boundary of Sec. 34, Twp. 49, Rge. 19 W4; 12. south along the east boundary of Secs. 34, 27, 22, 15, 10 and 3 in the Twp. to the north boundary of Twp. 48; 13. east along the north boundary to the east boundary of Rge. 18 W4; 14. south along the east boundary to the north boundary of Twp. 47; 15. west along the north boundary to the east boundary of Sec. 2, Twp. 48, Rge. 22 W4; 16. north along the east boundary to the north boundary of Sec. 2; 17. west along the north boundary of Secs. 2, 3, 4, 5 and 6 in the Twp. and the north boundary of Secs. 1, 2, 3, 4, 5 and 6 in Twp. 48, Rges. 23 and 24 W4 and the north boundary of Secs. 1 and 2 in Twp. 48, Rge. 25 W4 to the east boundary of Sec. 3 in the Twp.; 18. south along the east boundary of Sec. 3 to the north boundary of Twp. 47; 19. west along the north boundary to the east boundary of Rge. 26 W4; 20. north along the east boundary to the intersection with Highway 39; 21. west along Highway 39 to the intersection with Highway 60; 22. north along Highway 60 to the Devon town boundary; 23. west, north, west and north along the Devon town boundary to the right bank of the North Saskatchewan River; 24. downstream along the right bank to the starting point.
Note:

Members of the Legislative Assembly for Leduc-Beaumont-Devon
Assembly	Years	Member	Party
See Leduc electoral district from 1993-2004
26th	2004–2008	George Rogers	Progressive Conservative
27th	2008–2012	George Rogers	Progressive Conservative
See Leduc-Beaumont electoral district from 2012-Present and Battle River-Wainwright electoral district from 2012-2019

=== Electoral history ===
Leduc-Beaumont-Devon electoral district was created from the old district of Leduc in the 2003 electoral boundary re-distribution. The riding remained similar with only minor changes but added Beaumont and Devon to the name.

The first election saw Progressive Conservative candidate George Rogers win over 50% of the vote over a slate of five other candidates. He ran for re-election to a second term in 2008 and won the district with a landslide.

The Leduc-Beaumont-Devon electoral district was dissolved in the 2010 electoral boundary re-distribution, the western portion was reformed as the Leduc-Beaumont electoral district, while the eastern portion was included in Battle River-Wainwright electoral district.

== Legislative election results ==
=== 2004 ===
2004 Alberta general election
Party	Candidate	Votes	%	±%
Progressive Conservative	George Rogers	6,814	52.76%	–
Liberal	Joyce Assen	3,426	26.53%	–
Alberta Alliance	David Dalke	1,140	8.83%	–
New Democratic	Katie Oppen	902	6.98%	–
Greens	Stephen Lindop	382	2.96%	–
Social Credit	Karen Richert	250	1.94%	–
Total		12,914	–	–
Rejected, spoiled and declined		38	–	–
Eligible electors / turnout		27,025	47.93%	–
Progressive Conservative pickup new district.				
Source(s) Source: "Leduc-Beaumont-Devon Official Results 2004 Alberta general election". Alberta Heritage Community Foundation.

=== 2008 ===
2008 Alberta general election
Party	Candidate	Votes	%	±%
Progressive Conservative	George Rogers	9,045	64.91%	12.15%
Liberal	Joyce Assen	2,329	16.71%	-9.81%
New Democratic	Lisa Erickson	1,057	7.59%	0.60%
Wildrose	Sharon Maclise	1,008	7.23%	–
Green	Kevin Colton	495	3.55%	–
Total		13,934	–	–
Rejected, spoiled and declined		54	–	–
Eligible electors / turnout		32,419	43.15%	-4.78%
Progressive Conservative hold		Swing		10.98%
Source(s) Source: "Elections Alberta 2008 General Election". Elections Alberta.

== Senate nominee election results ==
=== 2004 ===
2004 Senate nominee election results: Leduc-Beaumont-Devon				Turnout 47.97%	
Affiliation	Candidate	Votes	% votes	% ballots	Rank
Progressive Conservative	Betty Unger	5,143	15.36%	48.06%	2
Progressive Conservative	Cliff Breitkreuz	4,549	13.59%	42.51%	3
Progressive Conservative	Bert Brown	4,416	13.19%	41.27%	1
Independent	Link Byfield	3,611	10.79%	33.75%	4
Progressive Conservative	David Usherwood	3,215	9.60%	30.04%	6
Alberta Alliance	Michael Roth	2,905	8.68%	27.15%	7
Progressive Conservative	Jim Silye	2,643	7.90%	26.70%	5
Alberta Alliance	Vance Gough	2,433	7.27%	22.74%	8
Alberta Alliance	Gary Horan	2,414	7.21%	22.56%	10
Independent	Tom Sindlinger	2,149	6.41%	20.08%	9
Total votes		33,478	100%		
Total ballots		10,701	3.13 votes per ballot		
Rejected, spoiled and declined		2,264			

Voters had the option of selecting four candidates on the ballot

== 2004 student vote results ==
Participating schools
Beaumont Composite High School
Christ the King Junior Senior High
Covenant Christian School
East Elementary School
John Maland High School
New Sarepta Community High School
Riverview Middle School
Round Hill School

On November 19, 2004, a student vote was conducted at participating Alberta schools to parallel the 2004 Alberta general election results. The vote was designed to educate students and simulate the electoral process for persons who have not yet reached the legal majority. The vote was conducted in 80 of the 83 provincial electoral districts with students voting for actual election candidates. Schools with a large student body that reside in another electoral district had the option to vote for candidates outside of the electoral district then where they were physically located.

2004 Alberta student vote results
Affiliation	Candidate	Votes	%
Progressive Conservative	George Rogers	713	43.29%
Green	Stephen Lindop	340	20.64%
Liberal	Joyce Assen	232	14.09%
NDP	Katie Oppen	186	11.29%
Alberta Alliance	Dale Dalke	105	6.38%
Social Credit	Karen Richert	71	4.31%
Total		1,647	100%
Rejected, spoiled and declined		38	

== See also ==
- List of Alberta provincial electoral districts
- Canadian provincial electoral districts
