= Brandon Lunty =

Canadian politician from Alberta

Brandon Lunty MLA

MLA for Leduc-Beaumont
- Incumbent
- Assumed office May 29, 2023
- Preceded by: Brad Rutherford

Personal details
- Party: UCP

Brandon Lunty is a Canadian politician from the United Conservative Party. He was elected as a Member of the Legislative Assembly of Alberta for Leduc-Beaumont in the 2023 Alberta general election.

Prior to his election as MLA, Lunty worked for the now-defunct Wildrose Party, being their candidate in the district of Calgary-South East in the 2015 election. In 2019, he unsuccessfully sought the UCP nomination for Camrose. More recently, he had been an intergovernmental affairs policy coordinator for the Alberta government.

== Electoral history ==
=== 2023 general election ===
2023 Alberta general election: Leduc-Beaumont
Party	Candidate	Votes	%	±%
United Conservative	Brandon Lunty	14,118	56.74	-1.66
New Democratic	Cam Heenan	10,069	40.47	+12.20
Independent	Kirk Cayer	292	1.17	–
Alberta Independence	Sharon Maclise	257	1.03	+0.39
Solidarity Movement	Bill Kaufmann	144	0.58	–
Total		24,880	99.34	–
Rejected and declined		166	0.66	
Turnout		25,046	62.51	
Eligible voters		40,070		
United Conservative hold		Swing		-6.93
Source(s) Source: Elections Alberta

=== 2023 UCP Leduc-Beaumont nomination contest ===
March 18, 2023

Candidate	Round 1		Round 2		Round 3		Round 4		Round 5	
Candidate	Votes	%	Votes	%	Votes	%	Votes	%	Votes	%
Brandon Lunty	346	26.4	359	27.7	376	30.0	420	35.7	552	52.3
Nam Kular	447	34.1	451	34.8	456	36.6	477	40.5	503	47.7
Karen Richert	231	17.6	236	18.2	249	19.8	281	23.9	Eliminated	
Heather Feldbusch	146	11.1	155	12.0	174	13.9	Eliminated			
Dawn Miller	82	6.3	94	7.3	Eliminated					
Dave Quest	60	4.6	Eliminated							
Total	1,312	100.00	1,295	100.00	1,255	100.00	1,178	100.00	1,055	100.00

=== 2015 general election ===
2015 Alberta general election: Calgary-South East
Party	Candidate	Votes	%	±%
Progressive Conservative	Rick Fraser	7,663	32.48%	-16.05%
New Democratic	Mirical MacDonald	7,358	31.19%	27.92%
Wildrose	Brandon Lunty	6,892	29.21%	-13.87%
Liberal	Gladwin Gill	1,304	5.53%	0.41%
Green	Jordan Mac Isaac	374	1.59%	–
Total		23,591	–	–
Rejected, spoiled and declined		103	52	15
Eligible electors / turnout		46,871	50.58%	2.72%
Progressive Conservative hold		Swing		-2.08%
Source(s) Source: "25 - Calgary-South East, 2015 Alberta general election". officialresults.elections.ab.ca. Elections Alberta.
