= George Rogers (Alberta politician) =

Canadian politician

George A. Rogers
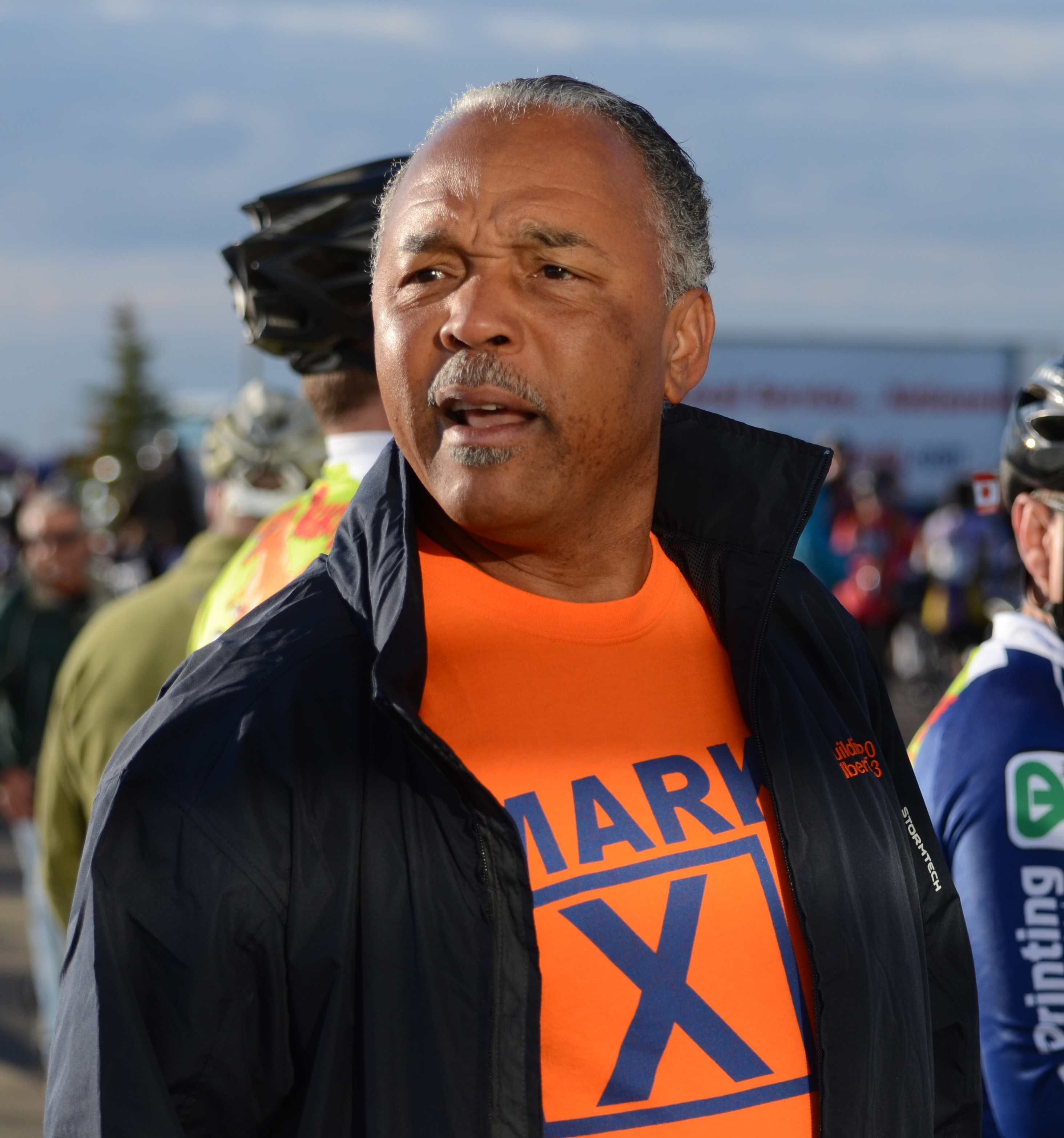
- Rogers at a 2014 charity event

MLA for Leduc-Beaumont
- In office November 22, 2004 – May 5, 2015
- Preceded by: New District
- Succeeded by: Shaye Anderson

Mayor of Leduc, Alberta
- In office 1998–2004
- Preceded by: John Jackie
- Succeeded by: Greg Krischke

Personal details
- Born: George Arthur Rogers; September 14, 1958 (age 68) Jamaica
- Party: Progressive Conservative
- Education: Northern Alberta Institute of Technology (NAIT); University of Alberta
- Occupation: businessman, politician

George Arthur Rogers (born September 14, 1958) is a Canadian politician from Leduc, Alberta. After serving on city council from 1992 to 1998, he was mayor of Leduc from 1998 to 2004. From 2004 to 2015 he served as MLA for the riding of Leduc-Beaumont. He is a member of the Progressive Conservative Association of Alberta.

== Early life ==
George Rogers was born in Jamaica and immigrated to Canada in 1975. Rogers is a father of three children and a very active community volunteer.

Rogers graduated from Leduc Senior High School in 1977 and from Northern Alberta Institute of Technology in 1980 with a diploma in business administration with an accounting major. In 1988 he received his certificate in local government studies from the University of Alberta.

Following graduation Rogers worked in the oil industry in various accounting positions up to the rank of assistant controller.

== Political career ==
In 1986, Rogers joined the city of Leduc as assistant treasurer and after three years moved to Redcliff, Alberta, where, as municipal administrator, he handled the roles of secretary-treasurer and assistant town manager.

In 1992, he returned home to Leduc to start a real estate sales career with Royal LePage and subsequently ran for city council in the fall of that year. He was elected in 1992 and again in 1995.

In October 1998, he was elected mayor and re-elected in October 2001.

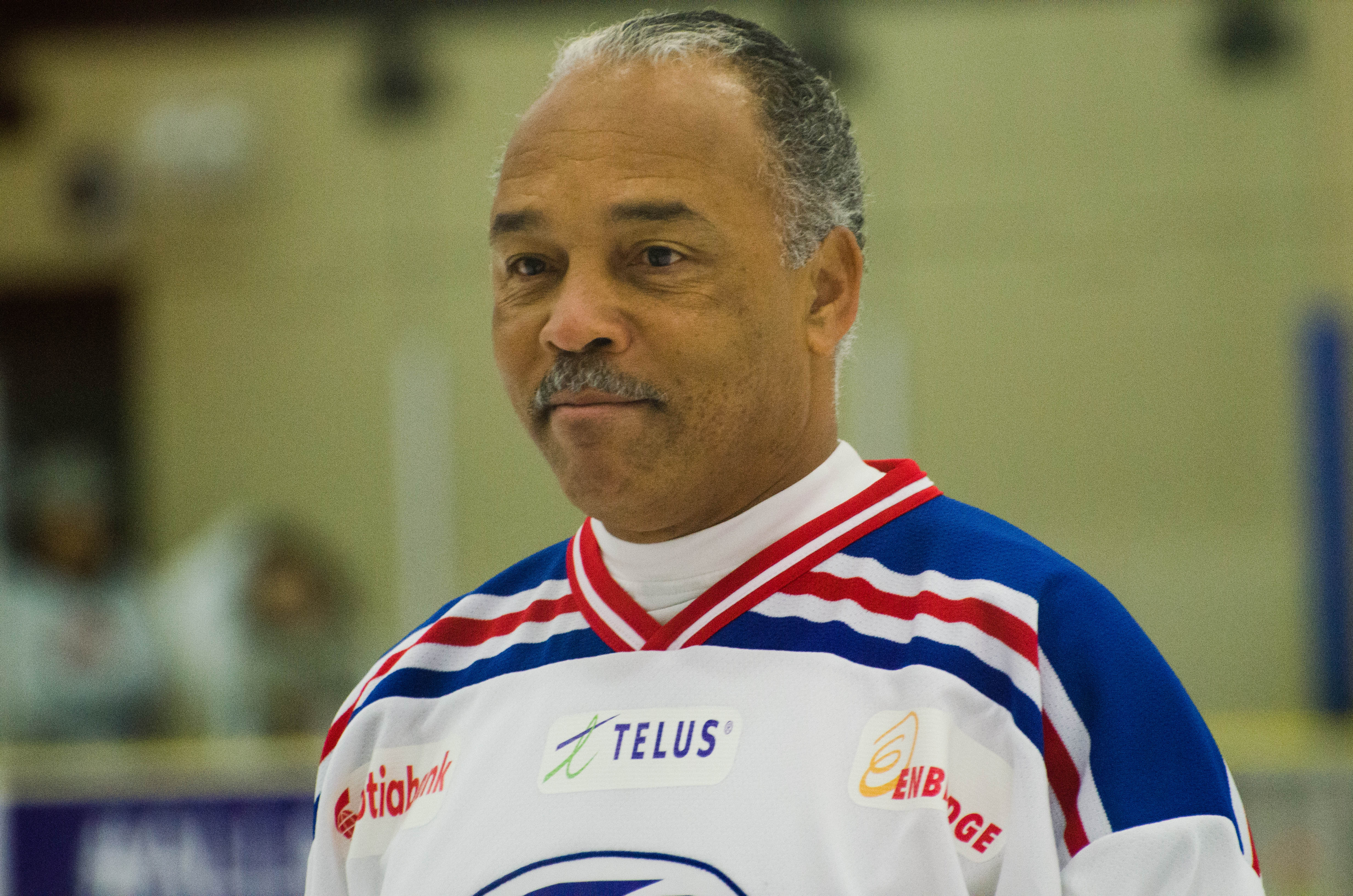
Rogers in 2015

He served as a board member of the Alberta Urban Municipalities association from 1993 to 2003, serving as president from 2001 to 2003; also serving as a board member of the Federation Of Canadian Municipalities representing Alberta. For this work, he was recognized by Alberta Venture Magazine as one of Alberta's 50 Most influential People in 2003

Rogers was elected to his first term as the Member of the Legislative Assembly for Leduc-Beaumont-Devon on November 22, 2004 and subsequently re-elected in 2008 and 2012. On December 15, 2006, he was appointed a member of the Treasury Board. In addition to his role as MLA, he served as Deputy Speaker (May 23, 2012 to May 5, 2015) and Chair of committees, has served as deputy chair of the Alberta Heritage Savings Trust Fund Committee, and a member of the Private Bills Committee, the Standing Committee on Managing Growth Pressures, Chair of the Cabinet Policy Committee on Public health And safety, as a member of The Legislative Policy Committee on Alberta's Economic Future, The Legislative Offices committee, Chair of The Chief Electoral Officer Search Committee, and Chair of The Ethics Commissioner Search Committee.

In the 2015 election, Rogers was defeated by New Democrat Shaye Anderson.

== Electoral history ==
=== 2004 general election ===
2004 Alberta general election: Leduc-Beaumont-Devon
Party	Candidate	Votes	%	±%
Progressive Conservative	George Rogers	6,814	52.76%	–
Liberal	Joyce Assen	3,426	26.53%	–
Alberta Alliance	David Dalke	1,140	8.83%	–
New Democratic	Katie Oppen	902	6.98%	–
Greens	Stephen Lindop	382	2.96%	–
Social Credit	Karen Richert	250	1.94%	–
Total		12,914	–	–
Rejected, spoiled and declined		38	–	–
Eligible electors / turnout		27,025	47.93%	–
Progressive Conservative pickup new district.				
Source(s) Source: "Leduc-Beaumont-Devon Official Results 2004 Alberta general election". Alberta Heritage Community Foundation.

=== 2008 general election ===
2008 Alberta general election: Leduc-Beaumont-Devon
Party	Candidate	Votes	%	±%
Progressive Conservative	George Rogers	9,045	64.91%	12.15%
Liberal	Joyce Assen	2,329	16.71%	-9.81%
New Democratic	Lisa Erickson	1,057	7.59%	0.60%
Wildrose	Sharon Maclise	1,008	7.23%	–
Green	Kevin Colton	495	3.55%	–
Total		13,934	–	–
Rejected, spoiled and declined		54	–	–
Eligible electors / turnout		32,419	43.15%	-4.78%
Progressive Conservative hold		Swing		10.98%
Source(s) Source: "Elections Alberta 2008 General Election". Elections Alberta.

=== 2012 general election ===
2012 Alberta general election: Leduc-Beaumont
Party	Candidate	Votes	%	±%
Progressive Conservative	George A. Rogers	8,420	51.29%	–
Wildrose	David Stasiewich	5,228	31.84%	–
New Democratic	Hana Razga	1,391	8.47%	–
Liberal	Jasen Maminski	727	4.43%	–
Alberta Party	William Munsey	453	2.76%	–
Evergreen	Jennifer R. Roach	199	1.21%	–
Total		16,418	–	–
Rejected, spoiled, and declined		98	–	–
Eligible electors / turnout		31,534	52.38%	–
Progressive Conservative pickup new district.				
Source(s) Source: "67 - Leduc-Beaumont, 2012 Alberta general election". officialresults.elections.ab.ca. Elections Alberta.

=== 2015 general election ===
2015 Alberta general election: Leduc-Beaumont
Party	Candidate	Votes	%	±%
New Democratic	Shaye Anderson	8,321	37.82%	29.35%
Wildrose	Sharon Smith	6,543	29.74%	-2.10%
Progressive Conservative	George A. Rogers	6,225	28.29%	-22.99%
Alberta Party	Bert Hoogewoonink	612	2.78%	0.02%
Green	Josh Drozda	301	1.37%	0.16%
Total		22,002	–	–
Rejected, spoiled and declined		81	–	–
Eligible electors / turnout		37,889	58.28%	5.91%
New Democratic gain from Progressive Conservative		Swing		-5.68%
Source(s) Source: "67 - Leduc-Beaumont, 2015 Alberta general election". officialresults.elections.ab.ca. Elections Alberta.
