= Nate Glubish =

Canadian politician (born 1981)

The Honourable Nate Glubish ECA MLA
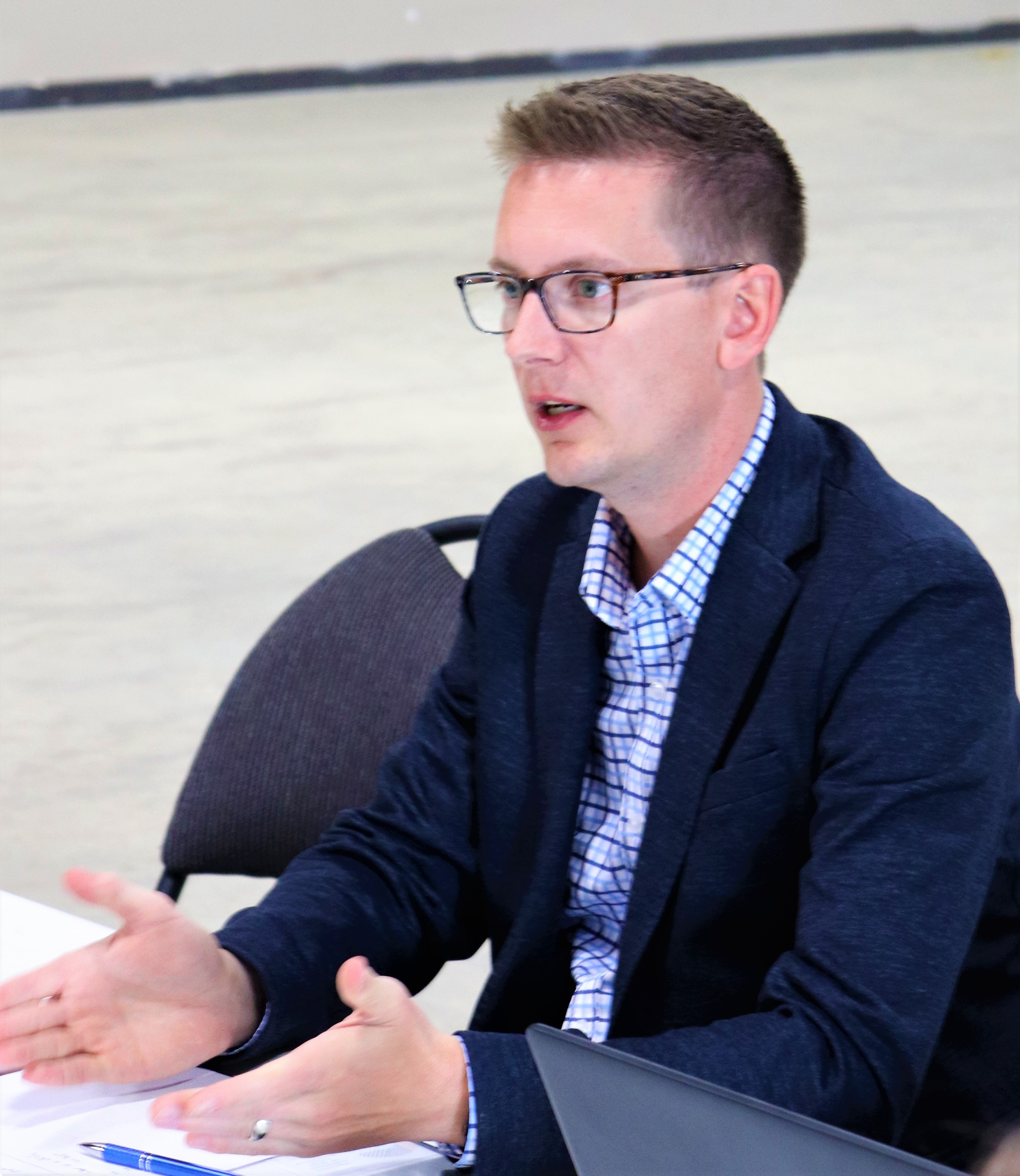
- Glubish in 2019

Minister of Technology and Innovation
- Incumbent
- Assumed office October 21, 2022
- Premier: Danielle Smith
- Preceded by: Tanya Fir

Minister of Service Alberta
- In office April 30, 2019 – October 21, 2022
- Premier: Jason Kenney; Danielle Smith
- Preceded by: Brian Malkinson
- Succeeded by: Dale Nally

Member of the Legislative Assembly of Alberta for Strathcona-Sherwood Park
- Incumbent
- Assumed office April 16, 2019
- Preceded by: Estefan Cortes-Vargas

Personal details
- Born: August 21, 1981 (age 45) Edmonton, Alberta, Canada
- Party: United Conservative Party
- Education: University of Saskatchewan
- Occupation: Financial planner

Nathanael Glubish ECA MLA (/ˈɡluːbɪʃ/ GLOO-bish; born August 21, 1981) is a Canadian politician who was elected in the 2019 Alberta general election to the Legislative Assembly of Alberta representing the electoral district of Strathcona-Sherwood Park.

== Before politics ==
=== Early life ===
Born in Edmonton, Mr. Glubish was raised in Saskatoon, where he earned his Bachelor of Commerce degree, majoring in finance, at the University of Saskatchewan before moving back to the Edmonton area in 2004 to start his career.

=== Career in the Private Sector ===
Nate Glubish worked for a number of investment firms, working to bring investment to Albertan tech companies. He began his career with Foundation Equity, an investment firm, where over 8 years he rose to Partner and participated in the negotiation and success of more than $40 million in technology business investments. He then spent 4 years at the Edmonton head office of NCSG Crane & Heavy Haul Services, where he managed their mergers and acquisitions efforts, investing over $150 million to buy 8 companies and grow their operations across North America. Prior to his election, Mr. Glubish worked for Vancouver-based Yaletown Partners, a Venture Capital fund.

== Political career ==
=== 2019 General Election ===
Nate Glubish was elected in the 2019 Alberta general election to the Legislative Assembly of Alberta representing the electoral district of Strathcona-Sherwood Park.

=== Minister of Service Alberta ===
From April 30, 2019, to October 23, 2022, Glubish served as Minister of Service Alberta, in the provincial government of Jason Kenney.

=== Minister of Technology and innovation ===
On October 24, 2022, Nate Glubish was made Minister of Technology and Innovation, by Premier Danielle Smith.

Before becoming Minister of Technology and Innovation, he noted plans to continue his work from Service Alberta to modernize government services with technology, and said he hopes to create more procurement opportunities for local startups. A responsibility that carried over from Service Canada to Technology and Innovation was rural broadband internet development. "I was responsible for securing $390-million in funding from the provincial government and securing $390-million in funding from the federal government to match our investment," Glubish said. "We've recently announced more than $70-million of that going towards over 50 communities serving over 10,000 new homes and that is just scratching the surface of the work we're about to do."

He has also expressed concern regarding online data privacy. Adding Alberta has its own private sector privacy law, marking it a leader in privacy legislation. He has stated that there are many benefits associated with technology and innovation, that modernizing Alberta's privacy legislation can help people enjoy those benefits, but should be done carefully. He emphasized the importance of "privacy-by-design" and "ethics-by-design" in privacy laws.

== Personal life ==
He is married to Allison, who is a junior high teacher with Elk Island Public Schools. They have a son, Max.

Between 2011 and 2014, he played keyboards in an Edmonton-based pop-rock band, Rend, winning the 2014 rock recording of the year from the Edmonton music awards. In addition to keyboards, he also plays acoustic, electric and bass guitar.

== Electoral history ==
=== 2023 general election ===
2023 Alberta general election: Strathcona-Sherwood Park
Party	Candidate	Votes	%	±%
United Conservative	Nate Glubish	13,865	53.07	+0.56
New Democratic	Bill Tonita	11,646	44.58	+12.31
Independent	Jody Balanko	614	2.35	–
Total		26,125	99.40	–
Rejected and declined		159	0.60	
Turnout		26,284	69.97	
Eligible voters		37,565		
United Conservative hold		Swing		-5.88
Source(s) Source: Elections Alberta

=== 2019 general election ===
2019 Alberta general election: Strathcona-Sherwood Park
Party	Candidate	Votes	%	±%
United Conservative	Nate Glubish	14,151	52.51	-1.34
New Democratic	Moira Váně	8,695	32.27	-10.56
Alberta Party	Dave Quest	3,605	13.38	+10.05
Alberta Advantage	Don Melanson	147	0.55	–
Green	Albert Aris	142	0.53	–
Alberta Independence	Richard Scinta	141	0.52	–
Independent	Larry Maclise	67	0.25	–
Total		26,948	99.36	–
Rejected, spoiled and declined		173	0.64	
Turnout		27,121	76.59	
Eligible voters		35,411		
United Conservative notional hold		Swing		+4.61
Source(s) Source: "84 - Strathcona-Sherwood Park, 2019 Alberta general election". officialresults.elections.ab.ca. Elections Alberta. Alberta. Chief Electoral Officer (2019). 2019 General Election. A Report of the Chief Electoral Officer. Volume II (PDF) (Report). Vol. 2. Edmonton, Alta.: Elections Alberta. pp. 408–412. ISBN 978-1-988620-12-1.

Alberta provincial government of Jason Kenney
Cabinet post (1)
Predecessor	Office	Successor
Brian Malkinson	Minister of Service Alberta; April 30, 2019 – October 23, 2022	Dale Nally; Merged with Ministry of Red Tape Reduction, end of Kenney government
