= Kurt Gesell =

Canadian politician

MLA for Clover Bar
- In office 1989–1993
- Preceded by: Walt Buck
- Succeeded by: District Abolished

Personal details
- Born: July 8, 1941 (age 84) Germany
- Party: Progressive Conservative; Independent

Kurt Gesell (born July 8, 1941) is a former provincial level politician from Alberta, Canada. He served as a member of the Legislative Assembly of Alberta from 1989 to 1993.

== Political career ==
Gesell ran as a candidate for the Progressive Conservatives in the 1989 Alberta general election. He won the electoral district of Clover Bar holding it for the Progressive Conservatives in a hotly contested three-way race that saw all three candidates finish within 200 votes of each other. During his only term in office, Gessell left the Progressive Conservative caucus and sat as an independent and broke party lines to vote against Bill 66 Members of the Legislative Assembly Pension Plan Amendment Act, 1993. He also left the caucus for the lack of free votes and free speech in the legislature.

Clover Bar electoral district was abolished due to redistribution in 1993, Gesell ran for a second term in office as an independent candidate in the 1993 Alberta general election in the new electoral district of Clover Bar-Fort Saskatchewan. He was defeated by Liberal candidate Muriel Abdurahman.
