= Fort Saskatchewan-Vegreville =

Provincial electoral district in Alberta, Canada

Alberta electoral district
- Fort Saskatchewan-Vegreville within Alberta, 2017 boundaries

Provincial electoral district
- Legislature: Legislative Assembly of Alberta
MLA
Jackie Armstrong Homeniuk
United Conservative
- District created: 2003
- First contested: 2004
- Last contested: 2023

Fort Saskatchewan-Vegreville is a provincial electoral district in Alberta, Canada. The district is mandated to return a single member to the Legislative Assembly of Alberta using the first-past-the-post method of voting. The electoral district, which is located in rural east central Alberta just east of Edmonton, was created in the 2004 boundary redistribution. The current boundaries of the district comprise parts of Vegreville-Viking, Redwater and Clover Bar-Fort Saskatchewan. The district is named after the small city of Fort Saskatchewan and the town of Vegreville.

The current representative for this district is United Conservative Jackie Armstrong-Homeniuk who was first elected in the 2019 provincial election. The district has also been represented by past Progressive Conservative Premier Ed Stelmach.

== History ==
The electoral district was created in the 2004 electoral boundary re-distribution from the old electoral districts of Clover Bar-Fort Saskatchewan, Redwater and Vegreville-Viking. The resulting population of the district in 2004 was 36,172, which was 1.5% above the provincial average of 35,951.

The 2010 electoral boundary re-distribution saw significant changes made to the district with land residing in Beaver County south of Tofield being moved to Battle River-Wainwright and land in Strathcona County north of Alberta Highway 16 being transferred into the electoral district from the old Strathcona electoral district.

The 2017 electoral boundary re-distribution saw a number of changes to the Fort Saskatchewan-Vegreville electoral district as four divisions in the central northeast area of the province (north and east of Edmonton) were consolidated into three to account for the population in those areas having grown at a rate below that of the province as a whole. The district would include the entirety of the Counties of Lamont and Minburn as well as Elk Island National Park. The resulting population of the district in 2017 was 52,141, 11% above provincial average for electoral districts. This variance was justified as population growth in the region is expected to continue to be less than the provincial rate of growth. The Commission noted the average age of residents in parts of the Fort Saskatchewan-Vegreville was well above that of other Albertans.

=== Boundary history ===
55 Fort Saskatchewan-Vegreville 2003 boundaries
Bordering districts
North	East	West	South
Athabasca-Redwater	Lac La Biche-St. Paul and Vermilion-Lloydminster	Leduc-Beaumont-Devon, Strathcona and Edmonton-Manning	Battle River-Wainwright
riding map goes here			
Legal description from the Statutes of Alberta 2003, Electoral Divisions Act.
Starting at the intersection of the right bank of the North Saskatchewan River with the south Fort Saskatchewan city boundary; then 1. downstream along the right bank of the river to the intersection with the north boundary of Twp. 57, Rge. 15 W4; 2. west along the north boundary to the east boundary of Sec. 32; 3. south along the east boundary of Secs. 32, 29, 20, 17, 8 and 5 in the Twp. and the east boundary of Secs. 32 and 29 in Twp. 56 to the north boundary of Sec. 20; 4. west along the north boundary of Sec. 20 to the east boundary of the west half of Sec. 20; 5. south along the east boundary of the west half of Sec. 20 to the north boundary of Sec. 17; 6. west along the north boundary of Secs. 17 and 18 in Twp. 56, Rge. 15 W4 to the east boundary of Rge. 16 W4; 7. south along the east boundary of Rge. 16 to the north boundary of Sec. 7 in Twp. 55; 8. east along the north boundary of Sec. 7 to the east boundary of Sec. 7 in Twp. 55, Rge. 15 W4; 9. south along the east boundary of Secs. 7 and 6 to the north boundary of Twp. 54; 10. west along the north boundary of Twp. 54 to the east boundary of Rge. 16 W5; 11. south along the east boundary of Rge. 16 to the north boundary of Sec. 7 in Twp. 54; 12. east along the north boundary of Secs. 7, 8, 9, 10, 11 and 12 in Rges. 15 and 14, Twp. 54 W4 to the east boundary of Rge. 14; 13. south along the east boundary of Rge. 14 to the north boundary of Sec. 19, Rge. 13, Twp. 53 W4; 14. east along the north boundary of Secs. 19, 20, 21 and 22 to the east boundary of Sec. 22; 15. south along the east boundary of Secs. 22 and 15 to the north boundary of Sec. 11; 16. east along the north boundary of Secs. 11 and 12 to the east boundary of Rge. 13 W4 (Highway 36); 17. south along Highway 36 to the north boundary of Sec. 23, Twp. 48, Rge. 13 W4; 18. west along the north boundary of Secs. 23, 22 and 21 to the east boundary of Sec. 20; 19. south along the east boundary of Secs. 20, 17, 8 and 5 in Twp. 48 and Secs. 32, 29, 20, 17, 8 and 5 in Twp. 47 and the east boundary of Secs. 32, 29, 20, 17 and 8 in Twp. 46 (Highway 36) to the north boundary of Sec. 5; 20. west along the north boundary of Secs. 5 and 6 in Twp. 46, Rge. 13 W4 to the east boundary of Rge. 14 W4; 21. north along the east boundary to the north boundary of Sec. 12 in Twp. 46, Rge. 14 W4; 22. west along the north boundary of Secs. 12, 11, 10 and 9 in the Twp. to the east boundary of Sec. 17 in the Twp.; 23. north along the east boundary of Secs. 17, 20, 29 and 32 in the Twp. to the north boundary of Twp. 46 (Highway 26); 24. west along the north boundary of Twp. 46 (Highway 26) to the east boundary of Sec. 6 in Twp. 47, Rge. 16 W4; 25. north along the east boundary of Secs. 6, 7, 18, 19, 30 and 31 in the Twp. to the north boundary of Twp. 47; 26. west along the north boundary to the east boundary of Rge. 18 W4; 27. north along the east boundary to the north boundary of Twp. 48; 28. west along the north boundary to the east boundary of Sec. 3 in Twp. 49, Rge. 19 W4; 29. north along the east boundary of Secs. 3, 10, 15, 22, 27 and 34 in the Twp. to the north boundary of Twp. 49; 30. west along the north boundary of Twp. 49 to the east boundary of Rge. 20 W4; 31. north along the east boundary of Rge. 20 to the north boundary of Sec. 1 in Twp. 50, Rge. 20 W4; 32. west along the north boundary of Secs. 1, 2, 3, 4, 5 and 6 in the Twp. and the north boundary of Secs. 1, 2 and 3 in Twp. 50, Rge. 21 W4 to the east boundary of Sec. 9 in the Twp.; 33. north along the east boundary of Secs. 9, 16 and 21 in the Twp. to the north boundary of Sec. 21; 34. west along the north boundary to the east boundary of Sec. 29 in the Twp.; 35. north along the east boundary of Sec. 29 to the north boundary of Sec. 29; 36. west along the north boundary to the east boundary of Sec. 31 in the Twp.; 37. north along the east boundary to the north shore of Ministik Lake; 38. in a generally easterly direction along the north shore of the lake to the east boundary of Sec. 34 in Twp. 50, Rge. 21 W4; 39. north along the east boundary of Sec. 34 to the north boundary of Twp. 50; 40. east along the north boundary of Twp. 50 to the east boundary of the west half of Sec. 2 in Twp. 51, Rge. 20 W4; 41. north along the east boundary of the west half of Secs. 2, 11 and 14 to the north boundary of Sec. 14; 42. west along the north boundary of Sec. 14 to the east boundary of Sec. 22; 43. north along the east boundary of Secs. 22, 27, 34 in Twp. 51 and the east boundary of Sec. 3 in Twp. 52 to the north boundary of the south half of Sec. 3; 44. west along the north boundary of the south half of Sec. 3 to the east boundary of Sec. 4; 45. north along the east boundary of Sec. 4 to the north boundary of Sec. 4; 46. west along the north boundary of Sec. 4 to the east boundary of Sec. 8; 47. north along the east boundary of Sec. 8 to the north boundary of Sec. 8; 48. west along the north boundary of Secs. 8 and 7 to the east boundary of Rge. 21 W4; 49. north along the east boundary of Rge. 21 W4 to the west boundary of Elk Island National Park; 50. northerly along the west boundary to the intersection of the west park boundary with the north boundary of Twp. 54; 51. west along the north boundary of Twp. 54 to the east boundary of Sec. 5 in Twp. 55, Rge. 20 W4; 52. north along the east boundary of Secs. 5, 8, 17 and 20 to Highway 15; 53. west and southwesterly along Highway 15 to the east Fort Saskatchewan city boundary; 54. southerly and westerly along the city boundary to its intersection with the right bank of the North Saskatchewan River, the starting point.
Note:

60 Fort Saskatchewan-Vegreville 2010 boundaries
Bordering districts
North	East	West	South
Athabasca-Sturgeon-Redwater	Lac La Biche-St. Paul-Two Hills and Vermilion-Lloydminster	Edmonton-Manning, Edmonton-Beverly-Clareview, and Strathcona-Sherwood Park	Battle River-Wainwright
Legal description from the Statutes of Alberta 2010, Electoral Divisions Act.

=== Electoral history ===
Members of the Legislative Assembly for Fort Saskatchewan-Vegreville
Assembly	Years	Member	Party
See Clover Bar-Fort Saskatchewan 1993–2004, Redwater 1993–2004 and Vegreville-Viking 1993–2004
26th	2004–2008	Ed Stelmach	Progressive Conservative
27th	2008–2012	Ed Stelmach	Progressive Conservative
28th	2012–2015	Jacquie Fenske	Progressive Conservative
29th	2015–2019	Jessica Littlewood	New Democratic
30th	2019–2023	Jackie Armstrong-Homeniuk	United Conservative
31st	2023–Present	Jackie Armstrong-Homeniuk	United Conservative

The electoral district of Fort Saskatchewan was created in the boundary redistribution of 2004. The first election held in the district saw longtime Vegreville—Viking incumbent Ed "The Sock" Stelmach win the new district of his party. He took just under half the popular vote, defeating four other candidates. Stelmach became leader of the Progressive Conservatives and premier of the province in December 2006. He stood for re-election in 2008 winning a landslide of nearly 78% of the popular vote. Progressive Conservative Jacquie Fenske won the district in the 2012 provincial election.

In the 2015 election, NDP candidate Jessica Littlewood won with a majority of 2,870, defeating Jacquie Fenske who finished second. Littlewood would stand for re-election in 2019, however she would be defeated by UCP candidate Jackie Armstrong-Homeniuk by the considerable margin of 6,443 votes.

== Legislative election results ==
=== 2004 ===
2004 Alberta general election
Party	Candidate	Votes	%	±%
Progressive Conservative	Ed Stelmach	6,160	48.34%	–
Liberal	Peter Schneider	3,160	24.80%	–
New Democratic	Wes Buyarski	1,633	12.81%	–
Alberta Alliance	Byron King	1,411	11.07%	–
Social Credit	Mark R. Patterson	379	2.97%	–
Total		12,743	–	–
Rejected, spoiled and declined		47	–	–
Eligible electors / turnout		24,831	51.51%	–
Progressive Conservative pickup new district.				
Source(s) Source: "Fort Saskatchewan-Vegreville Statement of Official Results 2004 Alberta general election" (PDF). Elections Alberta.

=== 2008 ===
2008 Alberta general election
Party	Candidate	Votes	%	±%
Progressive Conservative	Ed Stelmach	11,169	78.13%	29.79%
Liberal	Earl J. Woods	1,343	9.39%	-15.40%
New Democratic	Clayton Marsden	1,233	8.62%	-4.19%
Green	Ryan Scheie	551	3.85%	–
Total		14,296	–	–
Rejected, spoiled and declined		63	–	–
Eligible electors / turnout		29,513	48.65%	-2.86%
Progressive Conservative hold		Swing		22.60%
Source(s) Source: "55 - Fort Saskatchewan-Vegreville, 2008 Alberta general election". officialresults.elections.ab.ca. Elections Alberta. The Report on the March 3, 2008 Provincial General Election of the Twenty-seventh Legislative Assembly. Elections Alberta. July 28, 2008. pp. 418–423.

=== 2012 ===
2012 Alberta general election
Party	Candidate	Votes	%	±%
Progressive Conservative	Jacquie Fenske	8,370	49.30%	-28.83%
Wildrose	Shannon Stubbs	5,803	34.18%	–
New Democratic	Chris Fulmer	1,553	9.15%	0.52%
Liberal	Spencer Dunn	843	4.97%	-4.43%
Evergreen	Matt Levicki	229	1.35%	-2.50%
Independent	Peter Schneider	180	1.06%	–
Total		16,978	–	–
Rejected, spoiled and declined		145	–	–
Eligible electors / turnout		29,561	57.92%	9.27%
Progressive Conservative hold		Swing		-26.81%
Source(s) Source: "60 - Fort Saskatchewan-Vegreville, 2012 Alberta general election". officialresults.elections.ab.ca. Elections Alberta.

=== 2015 ===
2015 Alberta general election
Party	Candidate	Votes	%	±%
New Democratic	Jessica Littlewood	8,983	45.94%	36.79%
Progressive Conservative	Jacquie Fenske	5,527	28.27%	-21.03%
Wildrose	Joe Gosselin	3,959	20.25%	-13.93%
Liberal	Peter Schneider	475	2.43%	-2.54%
Alberta Party	Derek Christensen	324	1.66%	–
Green	Allison Anderson	285	1.46%	0.17%
Total		19,553	–	–
Rejected, spoiled and declined		140	–	–
Eligible electors / turnout		36,515	53.93%	-3.99%
New Democratic gain from Progressive Conservative		Swing		1.28%
Source(s) Source: "60 - Fort Saskatchewan-Vegreville, 2015 Alberta general election". officialresults.elections.ab.ca. Elections Alberta.

=== 2019 ===
2019 Alberta general election
Party	Candidate	Votes	%	±%
United Conservative	Jackie Armstrong Homeniuk	14,233	53.63%	5.11%
New Democratic	Jessica Littlewood	7,790	29.35%	-16.59%
Alberta Party	Marvin Olsen	3,386	12.76%	11.10%
Freedom Conservative	Malcolm Stinson	350	1.32%	–
Green	Rebecca Trotter	278	1.05%	-0.41%
Alberta Independence	Shane Ladouceur	261	0.98%	–
Alberta Advantage Party	Ronald Malowany	241	0.91%	–
Total		26,539	–	–
Rejected, spoiled and declined		154	–	–
Eligible electors / turnout		37,931	70.37%	16.44%
United Conservative gain from New Democratic		Swing		3.30%
Source(s) Source: "62 - Fort Saskatchewan-Vegreville, 2019 Alberta general election". officialresults.elections.ab.ca. Elections Alberta.

=== 2023 ===
2023 Alberta general election
Party	Candidate	Votes	%	±%
United Conservative	Jackie Armstrong-Homeniuk	14,126	58.07	+4.44
New Democratic	Taneen Rudyk	9,064	37.26	+7.91
Independent	Kathy Flett	801	3.29	–
Advantage Party	Kelly Zeleny	227	0.93	+0.03
Solidarity Movement	Granny Margaret Mackay	108	0.44	–
Total		24,326	99.37	–
Rejected and declined		154	0.63	
Turnout		24,480	60.14	
Eligible voters		40,706		
United Conservative hold		Swing		-1.73
Source(s) Source: Elections Alberta

== Senate nominee election results ==
=== 2004 ===
2004 Senate nominee election results: Fort Saskatchewan-Vegreville				Turnout 52.13%	
Affiliation	Candidate	Votes	% votes	% ballots	Rank
Progressive Conservative	Betty Unger	4,823	14.45%	45.03%	2
Progressive Conservative	Bert Brown	4,007	12.00%	37.41%	1
Independent	Link Byfield	3,805	11.40%	35.53%	4
Progressive Conservative	Cliff Breitkreuz	3,693	11.05%	34.48%	3
Alberta Alliance	Michael Roth	3,168	9.49%	29.58%	7
Alberta Alliance	Gary Horan	2,984	8.94%	27.86%	10
Alberta Alliance	Vance Gough	2,875	8.61%	26.84%	8
Progressive Conservative	David Usherwood	2,873	8.60%	26.83%	6
Independent	Tom Sindlinger	2,597	7.78%	24.25%	9
Progressive Conservative	Jim Silye	2,561	7.68%	23.91%	5
Total votes		33,386	100%		
Total ballots		10,710	3.12 votes per ballot		
Rejected, spoiled and declined		2,235			

Voters had the option of selecting four candidates on the ballot

== Student vote results ==
=== 2004 ===
Participating schools
Andrew School
Fort Saskatchewan Christian School
Holden School
John Paul II High School
Lamont Elementary School
Our Lady of the Angels
Rudolph Henning School
Ryley School
Tofield School
Vegreville Composite High School

On November 19, 2004, a student vote was conducted at participating Alberta schools to parallel the 2004 Alberta general election results. The vote was designed to educate students and simulate the electoral process for persons who have not yet reached the legal majority. The vote was conducted in 80 of the 83 provincial electoral districts with students voting for actual election candidates. Schools with a large student body that reside in another electoral district had the option to vote for candidates outside of the electoral district then where they were physically located.

2004 Alberta student vote results
Affiliation	Candidate	Votes	%
Progressive Conservative	Ed Stelmach	448	40.73%
Liberal	Peter Schneider	197	17.91%
New Democratic	Wes Buyarski	173	15.73%
Alberta Alliance	Byron King	143	13.00%
Social Credit	Mark Patterson	139	12.63%
Total		1,100	100%
Rejected, spoiled and declined		134	

== See also ==
- List of Alberta provincial electoral districts
- Canadian provincial electoral districts
