= Shaye Anderson =

Canadian politician (born 1975)

The Honourable Shaye Anderson ECA
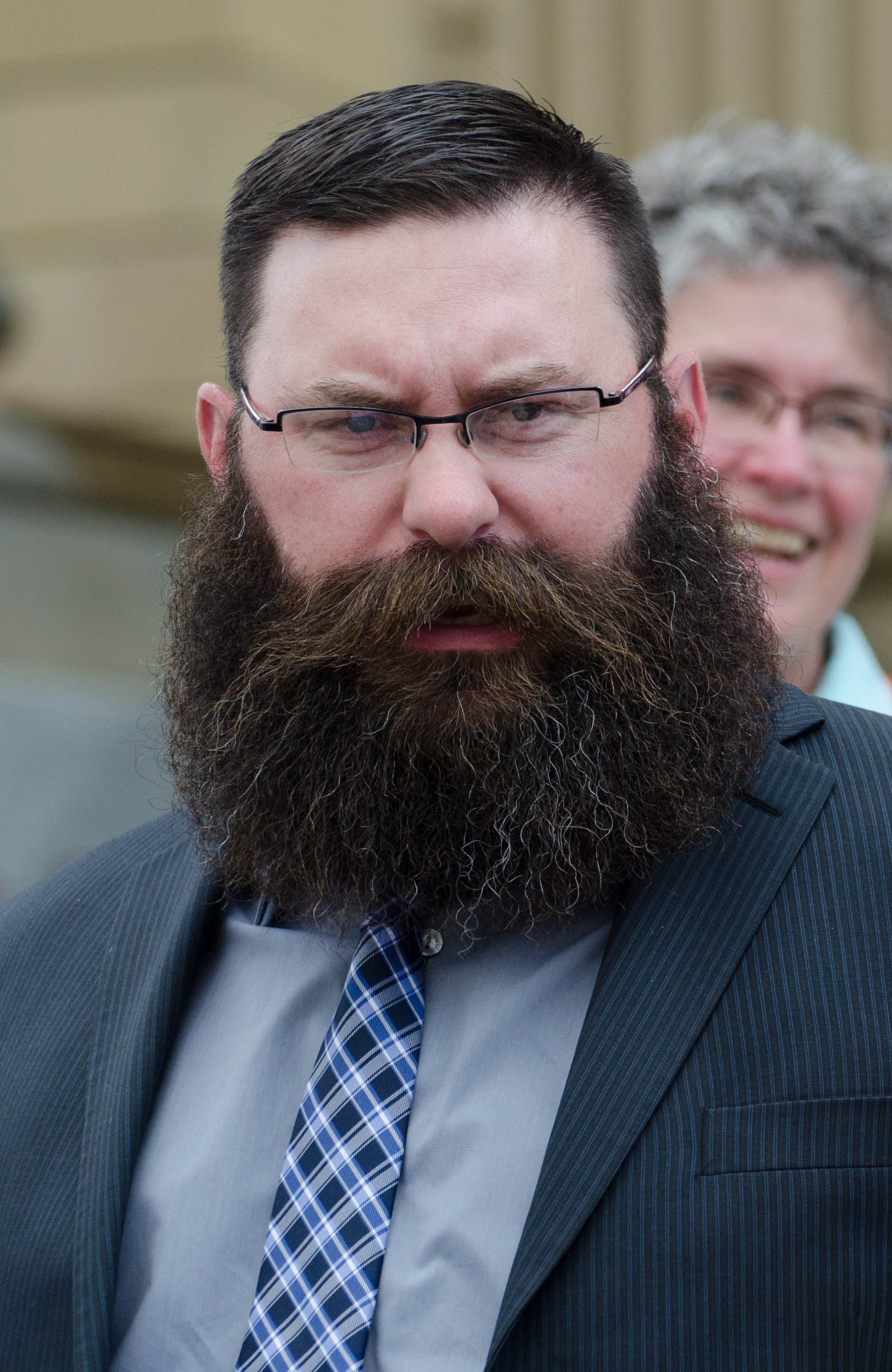
- Anderson as Minister

Minister of Municipal Affairs of Alberta
- In office January 19, 2017 – April 30, 2019
- Preceded by: Danielle Larivee
- Succeeded by: Kaycee Madu

Member of the Legislative Assembly of Alberta for Leduc-Beaumont
- In office May 5, 2015 – March 19, 2019
- Preceded by: George Rogers
- Succeeded by: Brad Rutherford

Personal details
- Born: Shaye Quinn Anderson; March 21, 1975 (age 51) Duncan, British Columbia, Canada
- Party: New Democratic Party
- Spouse: Kelly Edwards
- Education: Malaspina University-College
- Occupation: Install and repair technician, union steward

Shaye Quinn Anderson ECA (born March 21, 1975) is a Canadian politician who was elected in the 2015 Alberta general election to the Legislative Assembly of Alberta representing the electoral district of Leduc-Beaumont. A New Democrat, Anderson defeated longtime MLA George Rogers in an election that saw the NDP win a majority government, the first government change the province had seen since 1971. On January 19, 2017, Anderson was sworn in as minister of municipal affairs.

Anderson was defeated in the 2019 Alberta general election by United Conservative Party candidate Brad Rutherford. Following his defeat, Anderson moved back to his hometown of Duncan, British Columbia; in 2021, he sought the federal NDP nomination for Nanaimo—Ladysmith though was defeated. In 2026, Anderson endorsed Avi Lewis in that year's federal NDP leadership race.

Anderson attended Cowichan Secondary School, graduating in 1993. He is an install and repair technician for Telus and a shop union steward. He is from Duncan, British Columbia and has a diploma in physical education from Malaspina University-College in Nanaimo, British Columbia

His pronounced facial hair drew some attention after his election, with one columnist for the National Post calling it "the most conspicuous and healthy beard seen in Canadian politics this side of the 19th century."

== Electoral history ==
=== 2019 general election ===
2019 Alberta general election: Leduc-Beaumont
Party	Candidate	Votes	%	±%
United Conservative	Brad Rutherford	14,982	58.40	+2.70
New Democratic	Shaye Anderson	7,251	28.27	-11.84
Alberta Party	Robb Connelly	2,206	8.60	+5.82
Alberta Advantage Party	Gil Poitras	304	1.19	–
Freedom Conservative	Jeff Rout	258	1.01	–
Liberal	Chris Fenske	212	0.83	–
Green	Jennifer R. Roach	203	0.79	-0.62
Alberta Independence	Kevin Dunn	165	0.64	–
Independent	Sharon Maclise	71	0.28	–
Total		25,652	99.05	–
Rejected, spoiled and declined		247	0.95	–
Turnout		25,899	72.54	
Eligible electors		35,705		
United Conservative gain from New Democratic		Swing		+7.27
Source(s) Source: "69 - Leduc-Beaumont, 2019 Alberta general election". officialresults.elections.ab.ca. Elections Alberta.

=== 2015 general election ===
2015 Alberta general election: Leduc-Beaumont
Party	Candidate	Votes	%	±%
New Democratic	Shaye Anderson	8,321	37.82%	29.35%
Wildrose	Sharon Smith	6,543	29.74%	-2.10%
Progressive Conservative	George A. Rogers	6,225	28.29%	-22.99%
Alberta Party	Bert Hoogewoonink	612	2.78%	0.02%
Green	Josh Drozda	301	1.37%	0.16%
Total		22,002	–	–
Rejected, spoiled and declined		81	–	–
Eligible electors / turnout		37,889	58.28%	5.91%
New Democratic gain from Progressive Conservative		Swing		-5.68%
Source(s) Source: "67 - Leduc-Beaumont, 2015 Alberta general election". officialresults.elections.ab.ca. Elections Alberta.
