= Strathcona-Sherwood Park =

Provincial electoral district in Alberta, Canada

Alberta electoral district
- Strathcona-Sherwood Park within the Edmonton Metropolitan Region, 2017 boundaries

Provincial electoral district
- Legislature: Legislative Assembly of Alberta
MLA
Nate Glubish
United Conservative
- District created: 2010
- First contested: 2012
- Last contested: 2023

Strathcona-Sherwood Park is a provincial electoral district in Alberta, Canada. The district was created in the 2010 boundary redistribution and is mandated to return a single member to the Legislative Assembly of Alberta using the first past the post voting system.

== History ==
The electoral district was created in the 2010 Alberta boundary re-distribution. It was created from the old Strathcona electoral district which had a portion of land split off north of Alberta Highway 16 to Fort Saskatchewan-Vegreville.

=== Boundary history ===
82 Strathcona-Sherwood Park 2010 boundaries
Bordering districts
North	East	West	South
Fort Saskatchewan-Vegreville	Fort Saskatchewan-Vegreville	Edmonton-Ellerslie, Edmonton-Mill Creek and Sherwood Park	Battle River-Wainwright and Leduc-Beaumont
Legal description from the Statutes of Alberta 2010, Electoral Divisions Act

=== Electoral history ===
Strathcona-Sherwood Park
Assembly	Years	Member	Party
Riding created from Strathcona
28th	2012–2015	Dave Quest	Progressive Conservative
29th	2015–2019	Estefania Cortes-Vargas	New Democratic
30th	2019–2023	Nate Glubish	United Conservative
31st	2023–Present	Nate Glubish	United Conservative

The electoral district was created in 2010. The current incumbent is Nate Glubish who was first elected as MLA in 2019.

== Legislative election results ==
=== 2012 ===
2012 Alberta general election
Party	Candidate	Votes	%	±%
Progressive Conservative	Dave Quest	9,695	50.71%	–
Wildrose Alliance	Paul Nemetchek	6,432	33.64%	–
New Democratic	Michael Scott	1,626	8.51%	–
Liberal	John C. Murray	1,365	7.14%	–
Total		19,118	–	–
Rejected, spoiled and declined		83	48	9
Eligible electors / turnout		32,159	59.73%	–
Progressive Conservative pickup new district.				
Source(s) Source: "82 - Strathcona-Sherwood Park, 2012 Alberta general election". officialresults.elections.ab.ca. Elections Alberta. Chief Electoral Officer (2012). The Report of the Chief Electoral Officer on the 2011 Provincial Enumeration and Monday, April 23, 2012 Provincial General Election of the Twenty-eighth Legislative Assembly (PDF) (Report). Edmonton, Alta.: Elections Alberta. Archived (PDF) from the original on May 6, 2021.

=== 2015 ===
2015 Alberta general election
Party	Candidate	Votes	%	±%
New Democratic	Estefania Cortes-Vargas	9,376	42.61%	34.10%
Progressive Conservative	Dave Quest	6,623	30.10%	-20.62%
Wildrose	Rob Johnson	5,286	24.02%	-9.62%
Alberta Party	Lynne Kaiser	721	3.28%	–
Total		22,006	–	–
Rejected, spoiled and declined		50	38	22
Eligible electors / turnout		34,346	64.28%	4.55%
New Democratic gain from Progressive Conservative		Swing		+27.36%
Source: "82 - Strathcona-Sherwood Park, 2015 Alberta general election". officialresults.elections.ab.ca. Elections Alberta. Chief Electoral Officer (2016). 2015 General Election. A Report of the Chief Electoral Officer (PDF) (Report). Edmonton, Alta.: Elections Alberta.

2015 Alberta general election redistributed results
Party	Votes	%
New Democratic	9,247	42.82
Progressive Conservative	6,418	29.72
Wildrose	5,211	24.13
Alberta Party	718	3.32
Source(s) Source: Ridingbuilder

=== 2019 ===
2019 Alberta general election
Party	Candidate	Votes	%	±%
United Conservative	Nate Glubish	14,151	52.51	-1.34
New Democratic	Moira Váne	8,695	32.27	-10.56
Alberta Party	Dave Quest	3,605	13.38	+10.05
Alberta Advantage	Don Melanson	147	0.55	–
Green	Albert Aris	142	0.53	–
Alberta Independence	Richard Scinta	141	0.52	–
Independent	Larry Maclise	67	0.25	–
Total		26,948	99.36	–
Rejected, spoiled and declined		173	0.64	
Turnout		27,121	76.59	
Eligible voters		35,411		
United Conservative notional hold		Swing		+4.61
Source(s) Source: "84 - Strathcona-Sherwood Park, 2019 Alberta general election". officialresults.elections.ab.ca. Elections Alberta. Alberta. Chief Electoral Officer (2019). 2019 General Election. A Report of the Chief Electoral Officer. Volume II (PDF) (Report). Vol. 2. Edmonton, Alta.: Elections Alberta. pp. 408–412. ISBN 978-1-988620-12-1.

=== 2023 ===
2023 Alberta general election
Party	Candidate	Votes	%	±%
United Conservative	Nate Glubish	13,865	53.07	+0.56
New Democratic	Bill Tonita	11,646	44.58	+12.31
Independent	Jody Balanko	614	2.35	–
Total		26,125	99.40	–
Rejected and declined		159	0.60	
Turnout		26,284	69.97	
Eligible voters		37,565		
United Conservative hold		Swing		-5.88
Source(s) Source: Elections Alberta

== See also ==
- List of Alberta provincial electoral districts
- Canadian provincial electoral districts
