= Brad Rutherford =

Canadian politician

Member of the Legislative Assembly of Alberta for Leduc-Beaumont
- In office April 16, 2019 – May 29, 2023
- Preceded by: Shaye Anderson
- Succeeded by: Brandon Lunty

Personal details
- Born: 1983 or 1984 (age 42–43)
- Party: United Conservative Party
- Occupation: Police Officer

Brad Rutherford is a Canadian politician elected in the 2019 Alberta general election to represent the electoral district of Leduc-Beaumont in the 30th Alberta Legislature.

== Before Politics ==
Prior to his election to the Legislative Assembly, Rutherford served for ten years a Constable on the Edmonton Police Service. In addition to being a constable, he took on roles as temporary acting sergeant and temporary acting detective for the southwest division and the Economic Crime Section. He also spent two years in the Canadian Armed Forces reserves.

== Political career ==
On June 3, 2019, Premier Kenney appointed Rutherford as the Government of Alberta's liaison to the Canadian Armed Forces.

As a member of the Legislative Assembly of Alberta, he sponsored the Traffic Safety (Tow Truck Warning Lamps) Amendment Act, 2022, which would have allowed flashing blue lights to be placed on tow trucks for the sake of visibility and roadside safety. The Alberta Motor Association had advocated for that since 2017. He also sponsored the Reservists’ Recognition Act, which passed on Dec 2, 2021. It named the last Saturday in September as Reservists’ Recognition Day.

He served as Government Whip and previously served as Deputy Whip. He stood down at the 2023 Alberta general election, and was succeeded by fellow UCP candidate Brandon Lunty.
