= Jessica Littlewood =

Canadian politician

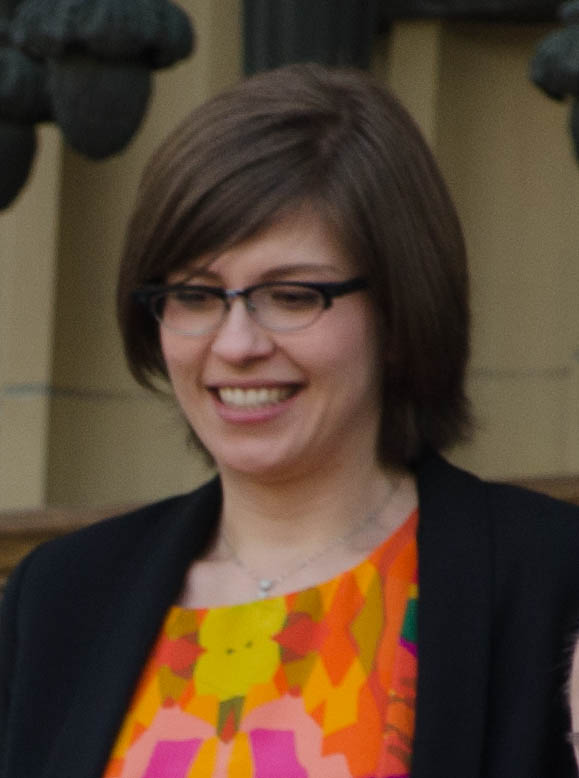
- Littlewood in May 2015

Member of the Legislative Assembly of Alberta for Fort Saskatchewan-Vegreville
- In office May 5, 2015 – March 19, 2019
- Preceded by: Jacquie Fenske
- Succeeded by: Jackie Armstrong Homeniuk

Personal details
- Born: Jessica Nadine Littlewood; February 18, 1983 (age 43) Alberta, Canada
- Party: Alberta New Democratic Party
- Occupation: Accounting executive assistant

Jessica Nadine Littlewood (born 1982/1983) is a Canadian politician who was the Member of the Legislative Assembly of Alberta representing the electoral district of Fort Saskatchewan-Vegreville from 2015 to 2019. She was first elected as a member of the New Democratic Party in the 2015 general election.

Prior to being elected, Littlewood worked as an accounting executive assistant at the firm Ernst and Young. She has also worked as an assistant manager Goodwill Industries of Alberta, and as a nursing attendant at Good Samaritan Society.

Within the legislature, Littlewood served as the chair of the Select Special Ethics and Accountability Committee. This special committee was formed to review the Alberta Elections Act, and related legislation, and give a report within a year. She was also the chair of the Standing Committee on Privileges and Elections, Standing Orders and Printing.

== Electoral history ==
=== 2019 general election ===
2019 Alberta general election: Fort Saskatchewan-Vegreville
Party	Candidate	Votes	%	±%
United Conservative	Jackie Armstrong Homeniuk	14,233	53.63%	5.11%
New Democratic	Jessica Littlewood	7,790	29.35%	-16.59%
Alberta Party	Marvin Olsen	3,386	12.76%	11.10%
Freedom Conservative	Malcolm Stinson	350	1.32%	–
Green	Rebecca Trotter	278	1.05%	-0.41%
Alberta Independence	Shane Ladouceur	261	0.98%	–
Alberta Advantage Party	Ronald Malowany	241	0.91%	–
Total		26,539	–	–
Rejected, spoiled and declined		154	–	–
Eligible electors / turnout		37,931	70.37%	16.44%
United Conservative gain from New Democratic		Swing		3.30%
Source(s) Source: "62 - Fort Saskatchewan-Vegreville, 2019 Alberta general election". officialresults.elections.ab.ca. Elections Alberta.

=== 2015 general election ===
2015 Alberta general election: Fort Saskatchewan-Vegreville
Party	Candidate	Votes	%	±%
New Democratic	Jessica Littlewood	8,983	45.94%	36.79%
Progressive Conservative	Jacquie Fenske	5,527	28.27%	-21.03%
Wildrose	Joe Gosselin	3,959	20.25%	-13.93%
Liberal	Peter Schneider	475	2.43%	-2.54%
Alberta Party	Derek Christensen	324	1.66%	–
Green	Allison Anderson	285	1.46%	0.17%
Total		19,553	–	–
Rejected, spoiled and declined		140	–	–
Eligible electors / turnout		36,515	53.93%	-3.99%
New Democratic gain from Progressive Conservative		Swing		1.28%
Source(s) Source: "60 - Fort Saskatchewan-Vegreville, 2015 Alberta general election". officialresults.elections.ab.ca. Elections Alberta.
