= Dave Quest =

Canadian politician

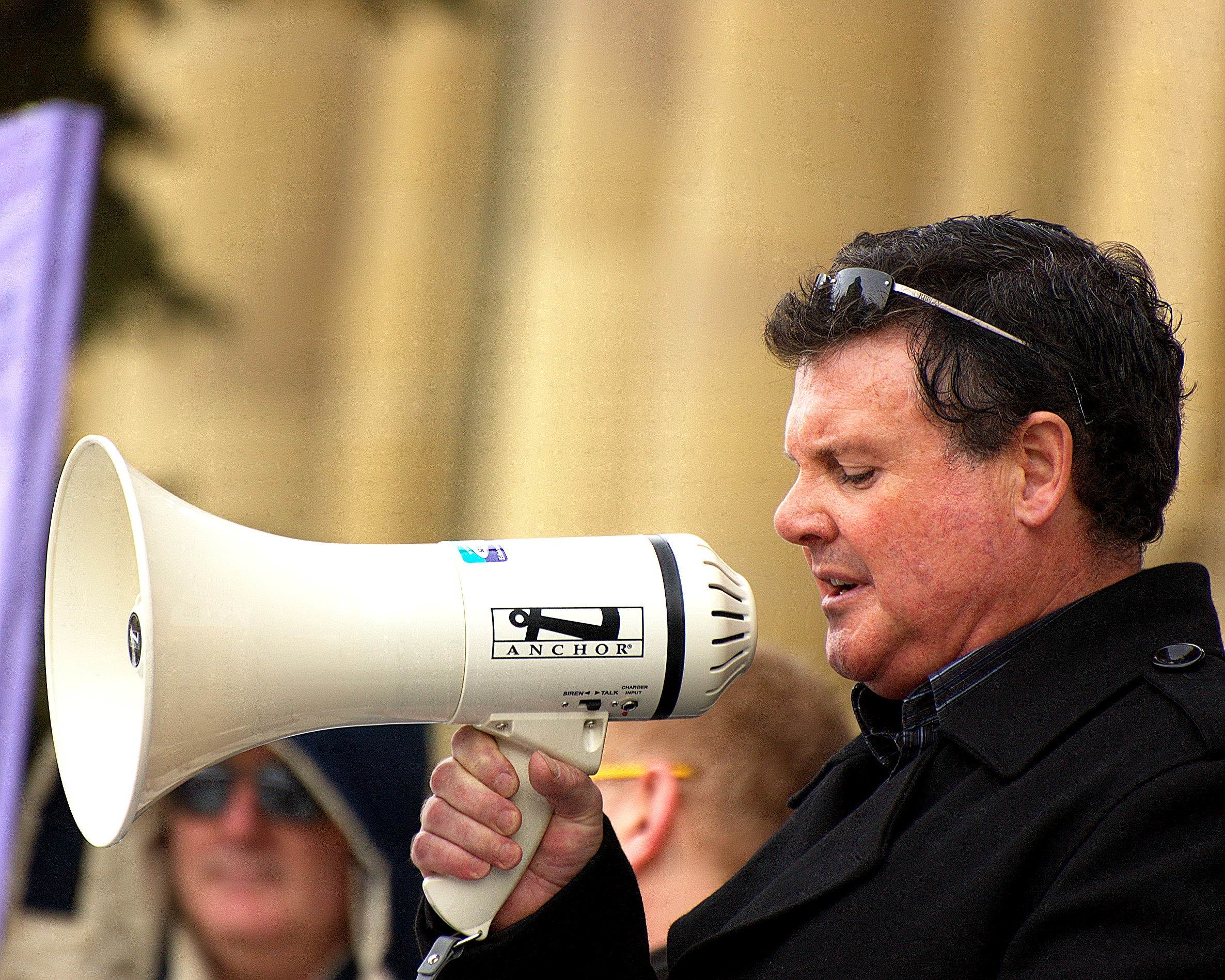

MLA for Strathcona-Sherwood Park
- In office March 3, 2008 – May 5, 2015
- Preceded by: Rob Lougheed
- Succeeded by: Estefan Cortes-Vargas

Personal details
- Born: January 28, 1964 (age 62) Bangor, United Kingdom
- Party: Conservative (federal); Alberta Party (provincial)
- Other political affiliations: Progressive Conservative
- Website: http://www.davequest.ca

David Jonothan Quest is a politician in Alberta, Canada, who was elected to the province's Legislative Assembly on March 3, 2008, as the Progressive Conservative MLA for Strathcona-Sherwood Park.

== Political career ==
Quest served two terms as MLA, first for Strathcona, and subsequently for Strathcona-Sherwood Park. In addition to his regular duties as an MLA, he had roles on many committees during his term, including as Chair of the Cabinet Policy Committee on Finance. However, he was defeated in 2015 along with most of the Progressive Conservative caucus.

Quest defended his successor, Estefan Cortes-Vargas, when The Rebel Media published personal attacks against them, stating that "to be attacked as an individual based on your sexuality or your country of birth is inexcusable."

Quest was appointed Associate Minister of Seniors in 2013 under Premier Alison Redford.

Having opposed Jason Kenney's bid for leadership of the Progressive Conservatives, Quest joined the Alberta Party and was the party's candidate in Strathcona-Sherwood Park in 2019.

== Personal life ==
Quest graduated from Ardrossan Senior High School, obtained his post-secondary education from NAIT, and in 1985 graduated with a business administration diploma with a major in marketing management. He obtained a private pilot's llicensein 1998 and regularly attends the Ardrossan United Church.

Quest is married to his wife Fiona Beland-Quest.

== Electoral history ==
2008 Alberta general election: Strathcona
Party	Candidate	Votes	%	±%
Progressive Conservative	Dave Quest	9,951	66.19%	17.10%
Liberal	Jon Friel	2,995	19.92%	-9.48%
New Democratic	Denny Holmwood	911	6.06%	-2.12%
Green	Kate Harrington	763	5.07%	–
Social Credit	Gordon Barrett	415	2.76%	0.41%
Total		15,035	–	–
Rejected, spoiled and declined		59	–	–
Eligible electors / turnout		32,140	46.96%	-3.31%
Progressive Conservative hold		Swing		13.29%
Source(s) Source: "Elections Alberta 2008 General Election". Elections Alberta.

2012 Alberta general election: Strathcona-Sherwood Park
Party	Candidate	Votes	%	±%
Progressive Conservative	Dave Quest	9,695	50.71%	–
Wildrose Alliance	Paul Nemetchek	6,432	33.64%	–
New Democratic	Michael Scott	1,626	8.51%	–
Liberal	John C. Murray	1,365	7.14%	–
Total		19,118	–	–
Rejected, spoiled and declined		83	48	9
Eligible electors / turnout		32,159	59.73%	–
Progressive Conservative pickup new district.				
Source(s) Source: "82 - Strathcona-Sherwood Park, 2012 Alberta general election". officialresults.elections.ab.ca. Elections Alberta. Chief Electoral Officer (2012). The Report of the Chief Electoral Officer on the 2011 Provincial Enumeration and Monday, April 23, 2012 Provincial General Election of the Twenty-eighth Legislative Assembly (PDF) (Report). Edmonton, Alta.: Elections Alberta. Archived (PDF) from the original on May 6, 2021.

2015 Alberta general election: Strathcona-Sherwood Park
Party	Candidate	Votes	%	±%
New Democratic	Estefania Cortes-Vargas	9,376	42.61%	34.10%
Progressive Conservative	Dave Quest	6,623	30.10%	-20.62%
Wildrose	Rob Johnson	5,286	24.02%	-9.62%
Alberta Party	Lynne Kaiser	721	3.28%	–
Total		22,006	–	–
Rejected, spoiled and declined		50	38	22
Eligible electors / turnout		34,346	64.28%	4.55%
New Democratic gain from Progressive Conservative		Swing		+27.36%
Source: "82 - Strathcona-Sherwood Park, 2015 Alberta general election". officialresults.elections.ab.ca. Elections Alberta. Chief Electoral Officer (2016). 2015 General Election. A Report of the Chief Electoral Officer (PDF) (Report). Edmonton, Alta.: Elections Alberta.

2019 Alberta general election: Strathcona-Sherwood Park
Party	Candidate	Votes	%	±%
United Conservative	Nate Glubish	14,151	52.51	-1.34
New Democratic	Moira Váně	8,695	32.27	-10.56
Alberta Party	Dave Quest	3,605	13.38	+10.05
Alberta Advantage	Don Melanson	147	0.55	–
Green	Albert Aris	142	0.53	–
Alberta Independence	Richard Scinta	141	0.52	–
Independent	Larry Maclise	67	0.25	–
Total		26,948	99.36	–
Rejected, spoiled and declined		173	0.64	
Turnout		27,121	76.59	
Eligible voters		35,411		
United Conservative notional hold		Swing		+4.61
Source(s) Source: "84 - Strathcona-Sherwood Park, 2019 Alberta general election". officialresults.elections.ab.ca. Elections Alberta. Alberta. Chief Electoral Officer (2019). 2019 General Election. A Report of the Chief Electoral Officer. Volume II (PDF) (Report). Vol. 2. Edmonton, Alta.: Elections Alberta. pp. 408–412. ISBN 978-1-988620-12-1.

=== 2023 UCP Leduc-Beaumont nomination contest ===
March 18, 2023

Candidate	Round 1		Round 2		Round 3		Round 4		Round 5	
Candidate	Votes	%	Votes	%	Votes	%	Votes	%	Votes	%
Brandon Lunty	346	26.4	359	27.7	376	30.0	420	35.7	552	52.3
Nam Kular	447	34.1	451	34.8	456	36.6	477	40.5	503	47.7
Karen Richert	231	17.6	236	18.2	249	19.8	281	23.9	Eliminated	
Heather Feldbusch	146	11.1	155	12.0	174	13.9	Eliminated			
Dawn Miller	82	6.3	94	7.3	Eliminated					
Dave Quest	60	4.6	Eliminated							
Total	1,312	100.00	1,295	100.00	1,255	100.00	1,178	100.00	1,055	100.00
