= Clover Bar-Fort Saskatchewan =

Defunct provincial electoral district in Alberta, Canada

Alberta electoral district

Defunct provincial electoral district
- Legislature: Legislative Assembly of Alberta
- District created: 1993
- District abolished: 2004
- First contested: 1993
- Last contested: 2001

Clover Bar-Fort Saskatchewan was a provincial electoral district in Alberta, Canada, mandated to return a single member to the Legislative Assembly of Alberta using the first-past-the-post method of voting from 1993 to 2001.

The electoral district was named for the city of Fort Saskatchewan and the Clover Bar community.

== History ==
The Clover Bar-Fort Saskatchewan electoral district was formed in the 1993 electoral boundary re-distribution from the dissolved Clover Bar electoral district.

The Clover Bar-Fort Saskatchewan electoral district was dissolved following the 2003 electoral boundary re-distribution and merged with portions of Redwater and Vegreville-Viking to form Fort Saskatchewan-Vegreville.

=== Members of the Legislative Assembly (MLAs) ===
Members of the Legislative Assembly for Clover Bar-Fort Saskatchewan
Assembly	Years	Member	Party
See Clover Bar electoral district from 1930-1993
23rd	1993–1997	Muriel Abdurahman	Liberal
24th	1997–2001	Rob Lougheed	Progressive Conservative
25th	2001–2004	Rob Lougheed	Progressive Conservative
See Fort Saskatchewan-Vegreville electoral district from 2004-Present

== Election results ==
=== 1993 ===
1993 Alberta general election
Party	Candidate	Votes	%	±%
Liberal	Muriel Abdurahman	5,612	41.97%	0.00%
Progressive Conservative	Rob Splane	4,816	36.02%	0.00%
New Democratic	W.H. (Skip) Gordon	2,072	15.50%	0.00%
Independent	Kurt Gesell	872	6.52%	0.00%
Total		13,372	–	–
Rejected, spoiled and declined		18	–	–
Eligible electors / turnout		21,510	62.25%	–
Liberal pickup new district.				
Source(s) Source: "Clover Bar-Fort Saskatchewan Official Results 1993 Alberta general election". Alberta Heritage Community Foundation.

=== 1997 ===
1997 Alberta general election
Party	Candidate	Votes	%	±%
Progressive Conservative	Rob Lougheed	6,864	47.72%	11.70%
Liberal	Muriel Abdurahman	6,364	44.24%	2.27%
New Democratic	Michael Berezowsky	922	6.41%	-9.09%
Independent	Max Cornelssen	235	1.63%	-4.89%
Total		14,385	–	–
Rejected, spoiled and declined		33	–	–
Eligible electors / turnout		23,185	62.19%	–
Progressive Conservative gain from Liberal		Swing		-1.24%
Source(s) Source: "Clover Bar-Fort Saskatchewan Official Results 1997 Alberta general election". Alberta Heritage Community Foundation.

=== 2001 ===
2001 Alberta general election
Party	Candidate	Votes	%	±%
Progressive Conservative	Rob Lougheed	9,674	62.73%	15.01%
Liberal	Skip Gordon	4,606	29.87%	-14.37%
New Democratic	Merrill Stewart	1,142	7.41%	1.00%
Total		15,422	–	–
Rejected, spoiled, and declined		33	–	–
Eligible electors / turnout		25,620	60.32%	–
Progressive Conservative hold		Swing		14.69%
Source(s) Source: "Clover Bar-Fort Saskatchewan Official Results 2001 Alberta general election". Alberta Heritage Community Foundation.

== See also ==
- List of Alberta provincial electoral districts
- Canadian provincial electoral districts
