= Jacquie Fenske =

Canadian politician

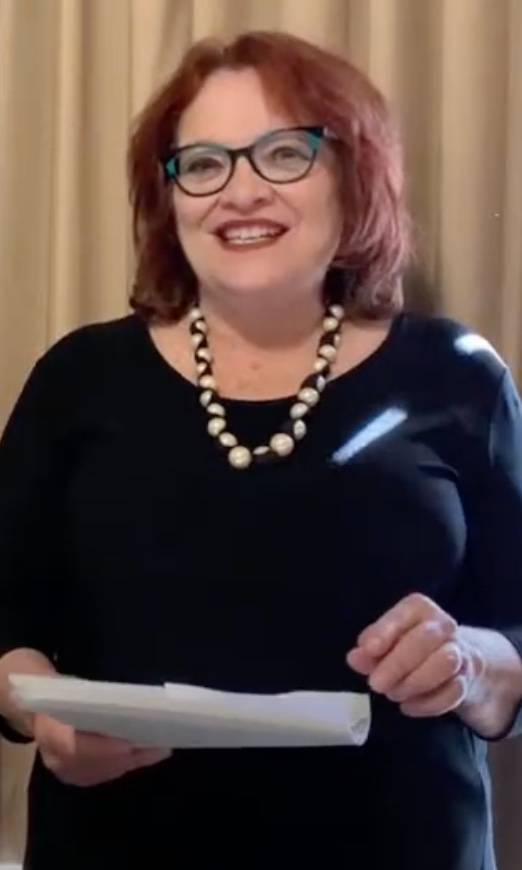
- Fenske on May 6, 2021

Interim Leader of the Alberta Party
- In office February 10, 2020 – August 31, 2021
- Preceded by: Stephen Mandel
- Succeeded by: Barry Morishita

Member of the Legislative Assembly of Alberta for Fort Saskatchewan-Vegreville
- In office April 23, 2012 – May 4, 2015
- Preceded by: Ed Stelmach
- Succeeded by: Jessica Littlewood

Strathcona County Councillor for Ward 5
- In office October 26, 2004 – May 2012
- Preceded by: Bob Weller
- Succeeded by: Clinton Alexander
- In office 1995–1998
- Preceded by: new ward
- Succeeded by: Bob Weller

Personal details
- Born: 1955 or 1956 (age 70–71)
- Party: Alberta Party
- Other political affiliations: Progressive Conservative (former)
- Education: University of Alberta
- Website: Official website

Jacquie Fenske (born 1955 or 1956) is a Canadian politician, who served as interim leader of the Alberta Party from 2020 to 2021. She served on Strathcona County Council from 1995 to 1998, and again from 2004 to 2012. Fenske then went into provincial politics as a Progressive Conservative, representing the riding of Fort Saskatchewan-Vegreville from 2012 to 2015. In the 2015 provincial election, the seat was won by NDP candidate, Jessica Littlewood.

== Political career ==
Jacquie Fenske successfully ran for county councillor, in the new Ward 5, in 1995. After a six-year hiatus, she became councillor again for the ward in 2004. Fenske was acclaimed in 2007, and 2010. She unsuccessfully ran for the Conservative Party of Canada nomination for Edmonton—Sherwood Park, prior to the 2008 federal election; Tim Uppal was nominated and won.

On April 23, 2012, with Fort Saskatchewan-Vegreville MLA and former Premier Ed Stelmach retiring, Fenske won the Fort Saskatchewan-Vegreville riding for the Progressive Conservative (PC) Party.

In the 2017 municipal elections, Fenske ran in the Mayoral race for Strathcona County. She lost, coming in third with 15.4% of the vote.

Fenske later joined the Alberta Party, and on February 10, 2020 she became the Interim leader of the Alberta Party.

2012 Alberta general election: Fort Saskatchewan-Vegreville
Party	Candidate	Votes	%	±%
Progressive Conservative	Jacquie Fenske	8,370	49.30%	-28.83%
Wildrose	Shannon Stubbs	5,803	34.18%	–
New Democratic	Chris Fulmer	1,553	9.15%	0.52%
Liberal	Spencer Dunn	843	4.97%	-4.43%
Evergreen	Matt Levicki	229	1.35%	-2.50%
Independent	Peter Schneider	180	1.06%	–
Total		16,978	–	–
Rejected, spoiled and declined		145	–	–
Eligible electors / turnout		29,561	57.92%	9.27%
Progressive Conservative hold		Swing		-26.81%
Source(s) Source: "60 - Fort Saskatchewan-Vegreville, 2012 Alberta general election". officialresults.elections.ab.ca. Elections Alberta.

2015 Alberta general election: Fort Saskatchewan-Vegreville
Party	Candidate	Votes	%	±%
New Democratic	Jessica Littlewood	8,983	45.94%	36.79%
Progressive Conservative	Jacquie Fenske	5,527	28.27%	-21.03%
Wildrose	Joe Gosselin	3,959	20.25%	-13.93%
Liberal	Peter Schneider	475	2.43%	-2.54%
Alberta Party	Derek Christensen	324	1.66%	–
Green	Allison Anderson	285	1.46%	0.17%
Total		19,553	–	–
Rejected, spoiled and declined		140	–	–
Eligible electors / turnout		36,515	53.93%	-3.99%
New Democratic gain from Progressive Conservative		Swing		1.28%
Source(s) Source: "60 - Fort Saskatchewan-Vegreville, 2015 Alberta general election". officialresults.elections.ab.ca. Elections Alberta.
