= 32nd Alberta general election =

Canadian provincial election

- On or before October 18, 2027

All 87 seats in the Legislative Assembly of Alberta 44 seats needed for a majority

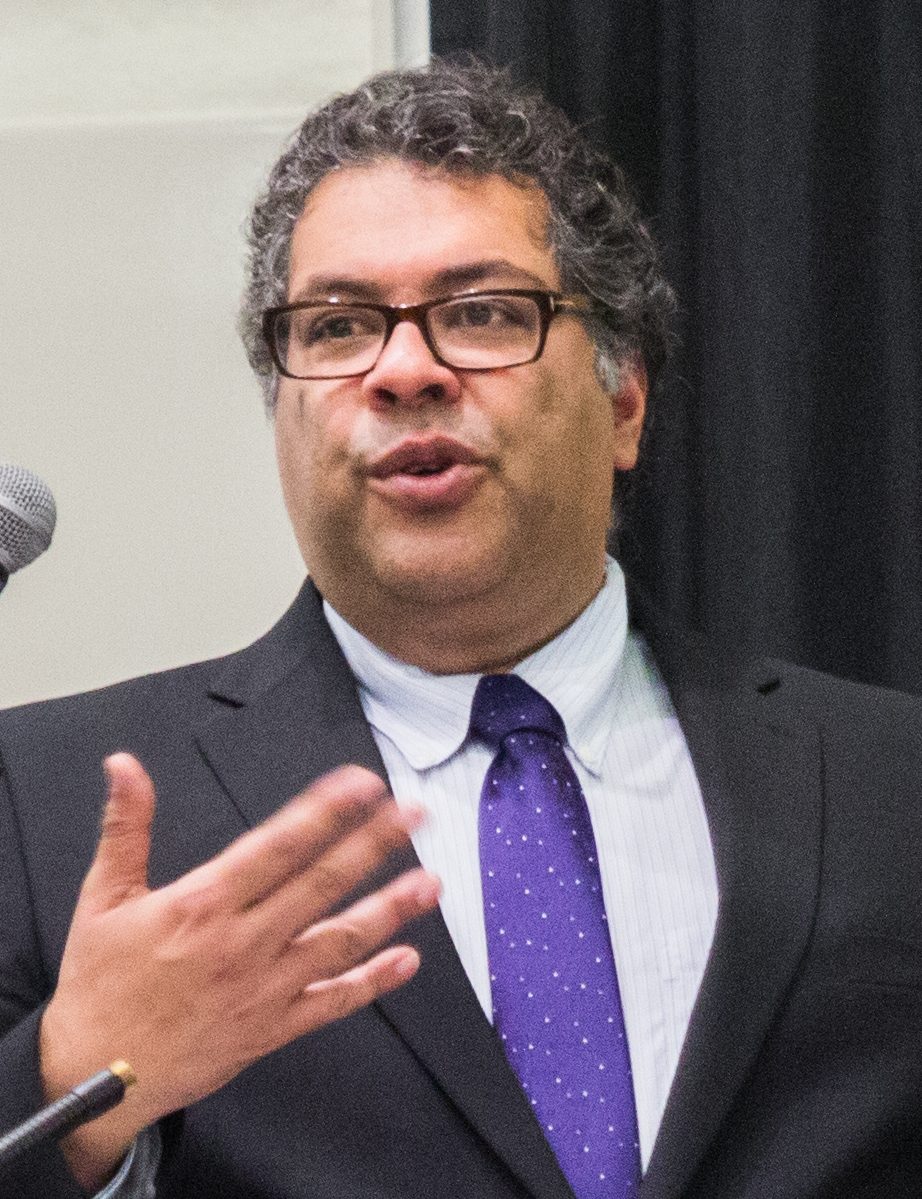

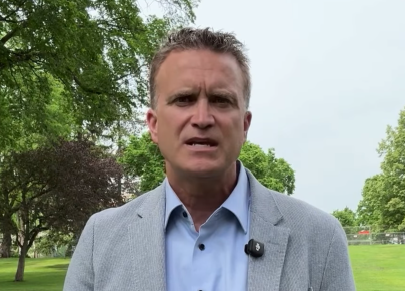
Leader	Danielle Smith	Naheed Nenshi	Peter Guthrie
Party	United Conservative	New Democratic	Progressive Tory (Note: Changed name from the Alberta Party on December 18, 2025.)
Leader since	October 6, 2022	June 22, 2024	December 9, 2025
Leader's seat	Brooks-Medicine Hat	Edmonton-Strathcona (Note: Nenshi will be seeking re-election in a Calgary seat. He will determine the specific riding after the completion of the 2026 Alberta electoral redistribution.)	Airdrie-Cochrane
Last election	49 seats, 52.56%	38 seats, 44.02%	0 seats, 0.71%
Current seats	46	39	1
Seats needed	Steady	▲5	▲43
Incumbent premier
Danielle Smith
United Conservative

The 32nd Alberta general election will elect members of the Legislative Assembly to serve in the 32nd Alberta Legislature. The Election Act requires that the election be held on October 18, 2027, but it may be called earlier. The incumbent United Conservative Party government, led by Premier Danielle Smith since 2022, will be seeking re-election to a third term.

In December 2024, the Electoral Boundaries Commission was mandated to propose new boundaries for 89 ridings, an increase from 87. It submitted its final report in March 2026. If the legislature implements the report before the 31st Legislature is dissolved, the election will be with these new boundaries.

== Background ==
=== Date of the election ===
Under the fixed-date provisions of Alberta's Election Act, "election day for a general election shall be the third Monday in October in the 4th calendar year following the election day of the most recent general election". As the previous election was held in 2023, the next election is scheduled for October 18, 2027. However, the Election Act is subject to the powers of the lieutenant governor of Alberta to dissolve the legislature before that time, in accordance with the usual conventions of the Westminster parliamentary system.

2025–2026 electoral boundary commission

The Electoral Boundaries Commission Act requires that a Commission be appointed during the first session of the Legislature following every second general election. The Commission requires a non-partisan chair, two government members recommended by the Premier, and two opposition members.

On March 28, 2025, the Electoral Boundaries Commission was established and held 30 public hearings across Alberta and received nearly 2,000 written submissions. The Commission was provided with a mandate which increased the size of the Legislature from 87 to 89 seats. The report recommended two additional ridings for Calgary, one additional riding in the city of Edmonton, and the modification of ridings in central and southern Alberta.

A minority opinion written by two of the commission's members recommended a different set of electoral divisions, including greater use of "hybrid" ridings around Alberta cities to "improve regional representation, bridge artificial urban/rural divides and to manage population shifts." This opinion was criticized by the Opposition NDP, which argued that the ruling United Conservative Party was attempting to gerrymander electoral districts to increase the power of rural votes. On April 16, 2026, the government rejected the Electoral Boundaries Commission report while replacing it with expedited process overseen by a government-led committee that comes without public consultation. The government is also seeking to expand the legislature to 91 seats. On October 30, Alberta’s chief electoral officer, Gordon McClure, recommended in a letter to MLAs that the next election be done with the old map or that the election be delayed to allow time to implement the new map properly. Calgary mayor Jeromy Farkas also raised concerns that the new map would underrepresent the voters of the city, as 26 out of Calgary's 28 seats were above the provincial voter population average, and the city would also more accurately represented by 30 MLA seats as it made up one third of Alberta's population.

=== Incumbents not standing for re-election ===
Member of the Legislative Assembly	Electoral district	Date announced
Garth Rowswell	Vermilion-Lloydminster-Wainwright	March 2, 2026
Nate Horner	Drumheller-Stettler	May 20, 2026
Matt Jones	Calgary-South East	May 20, 2026
Lori Sigurdson	Edmonton-Riverview	June 15, 2026
Marlin Schmidt	Edmonton-Gold Bar	June 15, 2026
Luanne Metz	Calgary-Varsity	June 15, 2026
Joe Ceci	Calgary-Buffalo	June 15, 2026
Nagwan Al-Guneid	Calgary-Glenmore	September 25, 2026
Heather Sweet	Edmonton-Manning	September 25, 2026
Jason Stephan	Red Deer-South	October 19, 2026

== Changes in seats held ==
Changes in seats held (2024–present)
Seat	Before			Change			
Seat	Date	Member	Party	Reason	Date	Member	Party
Lethbridge-West	July 1, 2024	Shannon Phillips	█ New Democratic	Resigned	December 18, 2024	Rob Miyashiro	█ New Democratic
Lacombe-Ponoka	October 9, 2024	Jennifer Johnson	█ Independent	Joined the United Conservative Party caucus			█ United Cons.
Edmonton-Strathcona	December 30, 2024	Rachel Notley	█ New Democratic	Resigned	June 23, 2025	Naheed Nenshi	█ New Democratic
Lesser Slave Lake	March 7, 2025	Scott Sinclair	█ United Cons.	Removed from caucus			█ Independent
Lesser Slave Lake	May 7, 2026	Scott Sinclair	█ Independent	Rejoined caucus			█ United Cons.
Edmonton-Ellerslie	March 25, 2025	Rod Loyola	█ New Democratic	Resigned as MLA to run in the 2025 Canadian federal election	June 23, 2025	Gurtej Singh Brar	█ New Democratic
Airdrie-Cochrane	April 16, 2025	Peter Guthrie	█ United Cons.	Removed from caucus			█ Independent
Airdrie-Cochrane	July 23, 2025	Peter Guthrie	█ Independent	Joined the Alberta Party caucus			█ Alberta Party (Note: The Alberta Party changed its name to the Progressive Tory Party of Alberta on December 18, 2025.)
Olds-Didsbury-Three Hills	May 22, 2025	Nathan Cooper	█ United Cons.	Resigned to become Alberta's Senior Representative to the United States	June 23, 2025	Tara Sawyer	█ United Cons.
Calgary-Shaw	May 15, 2026	Rebecca Schulz	█ United Cons.	Resigned	September 14, 2026	Kyle Campbell	█ New Democratic
Lac Ste. Anne-Parkland	October 26, 2026	Shane Getson	█ United Cons.	Resigned	TBD	TBD	█ Vacant

== Timeline ==
=== 2023 ===
- May 29: The United Conservative Party (UCP) wins a majority government in the 31st Alberta general election, with the Alberta New Democratic Party (NDP) forming the Official Opposition. No other parties win seats in the election.
- June 9: The UCP Cabinet is sworn in.
- June 20: Olds-Didsbury-Three Hills MLA Nathan Cooper is elected Speaker of the Legislative Assembly.
- September 18: Jordan Wilkie resigns as Green Party leader.
- October 15: Barry Morishita resigns as Alberta Party leader.

=== 2024 ===
- January 16: Rachel Notley announces intention to resign as NDP leader before the next election. She will remain as leader until a leadership race chooses a successor.
- May 30: Bill 21 receives royal assent, changing the next fixed election date to October 18, 2027.
- June 22: Naheed Nenshi is elected leader of the Alberta NDP.
- July 1: Shannon Phillips resigns as MLA for Lethbridge-West, triggering a by-election.
- October 9: Jennifer Johnson, who appeared on the ballot as a UCP candidate in the last provincial election but was disavowed by the party during the campaign due to controversial comments comparing transgender children to faeces, is returned to the UCP caucus.
- November 20: By-election for the riding of Lethbridge-West called for December 18.
- December 5: Bill 31 receives royal assent, allowing the Electoral Boundaries Commission to add 2 more seats in the next redistribution.
- December 18: The 2024 Lethbridge-West provincial by-election is held, with the NDP's Rob Miyashiro elected.
- December 30: Rachel Notley resigns as MLA for Edmonton-Strathcona, triggering a by-election.

=== 2025 ===
- January 23: Naheed Nenshi acclaimed as Alberta NDP's by-election candidate in Edmonton-Strathcona.
- March 7: Lesser Slave Lake MLA Scott Sinclair is removed from the UCP caucus over comments made criticizing the budget.
- March 25: Rod Loyola resigns as MLA for Edmonton-Ellerslie, triggering a by-election.
- April 16: Airdrie-Cochrane MLA Peter Guthrie is removed from the UCP caucus after publishing a letter alleging the health minister withheld information from cabinet relating to the Alberta Health Services board of directors.
- May 13: MLA Ric McIver resigns his position as Minister of Municipal Affairs and is elected to the position of Speaker of the House, following Nathan Cooper's resignation as speaker.
- May 22: Olds-Didsbury-Three Hills MLA Nathan Cooper resigns his seat.
- June 23: By-elections are held in the ridings of Edmonton-Strathcona, Olds-Didsbury-Three Hills, Edmonton-Ellerslie. The NDP and UCP held their respective seats.
- July 23: Airdrie-Cochrane MLA Peter Guthrie and Lesser Slave Lake MLA Scott Sinclair join the Alberta Party, intending to change its name to the Progressive Conservatives.
- August 27: The Alberta Party votes to rebrand as the Progressive Conservative Party, pending confirmation from Elections Alberta.
- December 9: Peter Guthrie becomes the leader of the Alberta Party.
- December 18: The Alberta Party officially changes its name to the Progressive Tory Party.

=== 2026 ===
- March 26: The Electoral Boundaries Commission submits its report recommending the boundaries of 89 ridings.
- May 7: Lesser Slave Lake MLA Scott Sinclair returns to the UCP caucus.
- May 15: Calgary-Shaw MLA Rebecca Schulz resigns her seat.
- May 20: The Select Special Citizen Initiative Proposal Review Committee reviews Thomas Lukaszuk's "Forever Canadian" petition, and during debate the UCP sends out a press release indicating a separation question will be on the fall referendum ballot before a vote occurs.
- May 21: Premier Danielle Smith announces that a referendum will be held on October 19, 2026, asking if Alberta should stay in Canada or hold a referendum on separation.
- September 14: The NDP's Kyle Campbell wins the Calgary-Shaw by-election, gaining the seat from the governing UCP.
- October 26: Lac Ste. Anne-Parkland MLA Shane Getson resigns his seat.

== Opinion polls ==
Overall Polling with a local regression (LOESS) trend line for each party and a monthly average.

Pollster	Client	Dates conducted	Source	UCP	NDP	GRN	TORY	LIB	WLC	WIP	RPA	Others	Margin of error	Sample size	Polling method	Lead
		Oct 19, 2026	2026 Alberta referendum is held, with voters choosing to remain in Canada.													
Mainstreet Research	N/A	Oct 15-16, 2026		43%	43%	3%	6%	—	—	3%	—	3%	3.4%	825	IVR	Tie
Pollara	N/A	Oct 2-15, 2026		46%	50%	—	—	—	—	—	—	4%	2.7%	1,347	Online	4%
Abacus Data	N/A	Oct 7-13, 2026		47%	42%	—	6%	—	—	—	–	5%	3.1%	1,021	Online	5%
Leger	N/A	Oct 2–4, 2026		47%	45%	—	—	—	—	—	—	9%	3.1%	1,001	Online	2%
Janet Brown Opinion Research/Trend Research	CBC News	Sep 8–21 2026		41%	41%	1%	3%	3%	<1%	<1%	0%	10%	2.8%	1,200	Telephone	Tie
Abacus Data	N/A	Sep 4–7, 2026		52%	39%	—	6%	—	—	—	—	3%	3.1%	1,000	Online	13%
Research Co.	N/A	Aug 24–26, 2026		46%	43%	—	5%	—	2%	—	2%	2%	3.6%	750	Online	3%
Leger	N/A	Aug 21–23, 2026		51%	41%	—	—	—	—	—	—	9%	3.1%	1,001	Online	10%
Leger	Postmedia Network	May 29–Jun 1, 2026		49%	40%	—	—	—	—	—	—	11%	3.1%	1,014	Online	9%
Ipsos	Global News	May 28–Jun 1, 2026		48%	45%	—	—	—	—	—	—	6%	4.9%	600	Online	3%
Angus Reid	N/A	May 22–24, 2026		46%	45%	0%	4%	—	2%	—	—	2%	3%	800	Online	1%
Probe Research	N/A	Apr 27–May 6, 2026		46%	39%	2%	6%	6%	—	—	0%	2%	2.5%	1,484	Online	7%
Mainstreet Research	N/A	Apr 20–22, 2026		46%	42%	3%	4%	—	—	3%	—	3%	1.8%	3,129	IVR	4%
Janet Brown Opinion Research/Trend Research	CBC News	Apr 7–22, 2026		49%	36%	<1%	2%	3%	0%	<1%	<1%	8%	2.8%	1,200	Telephone	13%
Leger	N/A	Apr 3–6, 2026		53%	36%	—	—	—	—	—	—	11%	3.1%	1,003	Online	17%
Pollara	N/A	Mar 16–25, 2026		49%	42%	—	—	—	—	—	—	9%	1.7%	3,200	Online	7%
Leger	N/A	Mar 2–4, 2026		48%	36%	4%	5%	3%	1%	—	—	2%	3.1%	1,001	Online	12%
Abacus Data	N/A	Feb 20–25, 2026		49%	36%	2%	2%	9%	—	—	—	3%	3.1%	1,000	Online	13%
Mainstreet Research	Western Standard	Feb 10–12, 2026		48%	40%	—	3%	6%	—	—	1%	2%	2.5%	1,504	Smart IVR	8%
Leger	N/A	Jan 23–26, 2026		50%	37%	1%	4%	2%	1%	—	2%	3%	3.1%	1,003	Online	13%
Liaison	N/A	Jan 7–11, 2026		46%	44%	2%	2%	4%	—	—	—	2%	3.1%	1,000	IVR	2%
		Dec 18, 2025	The Alberta Party changes its name to the Progressive Tory Party of Alberta.													
		Dec 9, 2025	Peter Guthrie becomes the leader of the Alberta Party.													
Angus Reid	N/A	Nov 26–Dec 1, 2025		48%	45%	—	4%	3%	—	—	—	1%	5%	362	Online	3%
Leger	N/A	Oct 10–12, 2025		44%	39%	3%	2%	9%	<1%	—	1%	1%	3.0%	1,045	Online	5%
Cardinal Research	N/A	Sep 17–20, 2025		43%	36%	—	4%	5%	—	—	11%	1%	2%	2,626	IVR	7%
Angus Reid	N/A	Aug 28–Sep 5, 2025		51%	40%	—	4%	3%	—	—	—	1%	5%	431	Online	11%
Leger	N/A	May 23–25, 2025		48%	34%	2%	2%	9%	<1%	—	2%	2%	3.04%	1,040	Online	14%
Abacus Data	N/A	May 15–21, 2025		58%	32%	—	—	—	—	—	—	10%	5.0%	400	Online	26%
Janet Brown Opinion Research/Trend Research	CBC News	May 7–21, 2025		52%	38%	1%	1%	3%	—	<1%	—	4%	2.8%	1,200	Telephone	14%
Canadian Election Study	N/A	Apr 29–May 13, 2025		47%	43%	—	6%	—	—	—	—	4%	N/A	1,302	Online	4%
Environics	Alberta Federation of Labour	Apr 2–14, 2025		43%	47%	—	6%	—	—	—	—	4%	N/A	1,003	Online	4%
Mainstreet Research	N/A	Mar 18, 2025		51%	39%	2%	—	3%	—	1%	—	3%	2.8%	1,228	Smart IVR	12%
Leger	N/A	Jan 24–26, 2025		51%	36%	2%	3%	5%	1%	—	—	2%	3.1%	1,002	Online	15%
Cardinal Research	N/A	Sep 17–28, 2024		50%	43%	2%	1%	—	—	—	—	4%	2.5%	1,553	Telephone	7%
Leger	N/A	Aug 2–5, 2024		48%	40%	3%	4%	3%	2%	—	—	2%	3.1%	1,005	Online	8%
Sovereign North Strategies	Western Standard	Jul 6–11, 2024		47%	46%	1%	4%	—	—	2%	—	—	2.4%	2,861	Telephone	1%
Abacus Data	N/A	Jun 25–28, 2024		54%	40%	—	—	—	—	—	—	6%	3.31%	1,000	Online	14%
		June 22, 2024	Naheed Nenshi elected leader of the Alberta NDP.													
Leger	N/A	May 22–25, 2024		47%	43%	—	6%	—	—	—	—	4%	3.1%	1,009	Online	4%
Leger	N/A	Mar 22–24, 2024		46%	44%	1%	4%	1%	1%	—	—	2%	3.1%	1,002	Online	2%
Abacus Data	N/A	Mar 14–21, 2024		55%	40%	—	2%	—	—	—	—	2%	3.1%	1,000	Online	15%
Pallas Data	N/A	Mar 12–13, 2024		52%	45%	—	—	—	—	—	—	3%	3.3%	868	IVR	7%
Leger	N/A	Mar 8–11, 2024		49%	41%	—	6%	—	—	—	—	4%	3.1%	1,001	Online	8%
Leger	N/A	Feb 9–12, 2024		49%	42%	—	5%	—	—	—	—	4%	3.1%	1,002	Online	7%
Leger	N/A	Jan 19–22, 2024		51%	40%	—	—	—	—	—	—	9%	3.1%	1,001	Online	11%
Leger	N/A	Jan 12–15, 2024		50%	43%	—	3%	—	—	—	—	4%	3.1%	1,012	Online	7%
Angus Reid	N/A	Nov 24 – Dec 1, 2023		53%	40%	—	3%	2%	—	—	—	1%	5%	392	Online	13%
Leger	N/A	Oct 27–30, 2023		46%	47%	—	5%	—	—	—	—	2%	3.1%	1,001	Online	1%
Leger	N/A	Sep 15–18, 2023		49%	39%	2%	4%	3%	1%	—	—	2%	3.1%	1,001	Online	10%
2023 general election		May 29, 2023		52.63%	44.05%	0.76%	0.71%	0.24%	0.24%	0.05%	0.01%	1.31%	—	—	—	8.58%

Hypothetical polling

Hypothetical voting intentions with the Alberta Party being rebranded to the Progressive Conservatives

Pollster	Client	Dates conducted	Source	UCP	NDP	PC	Liberal	RPA	Others	Margin of error	Sample size	Polling method	Lead
Cardinal Research	N/A	Sep 17–20, 2025		25%	30%	28%	4%	11%	2%	2%	2,626	IVR	2%
