= 2025 Alberta provincial by-elections =

- June 23, 2025

3 of the 87 seats in the Legislative Assembly of Alberta
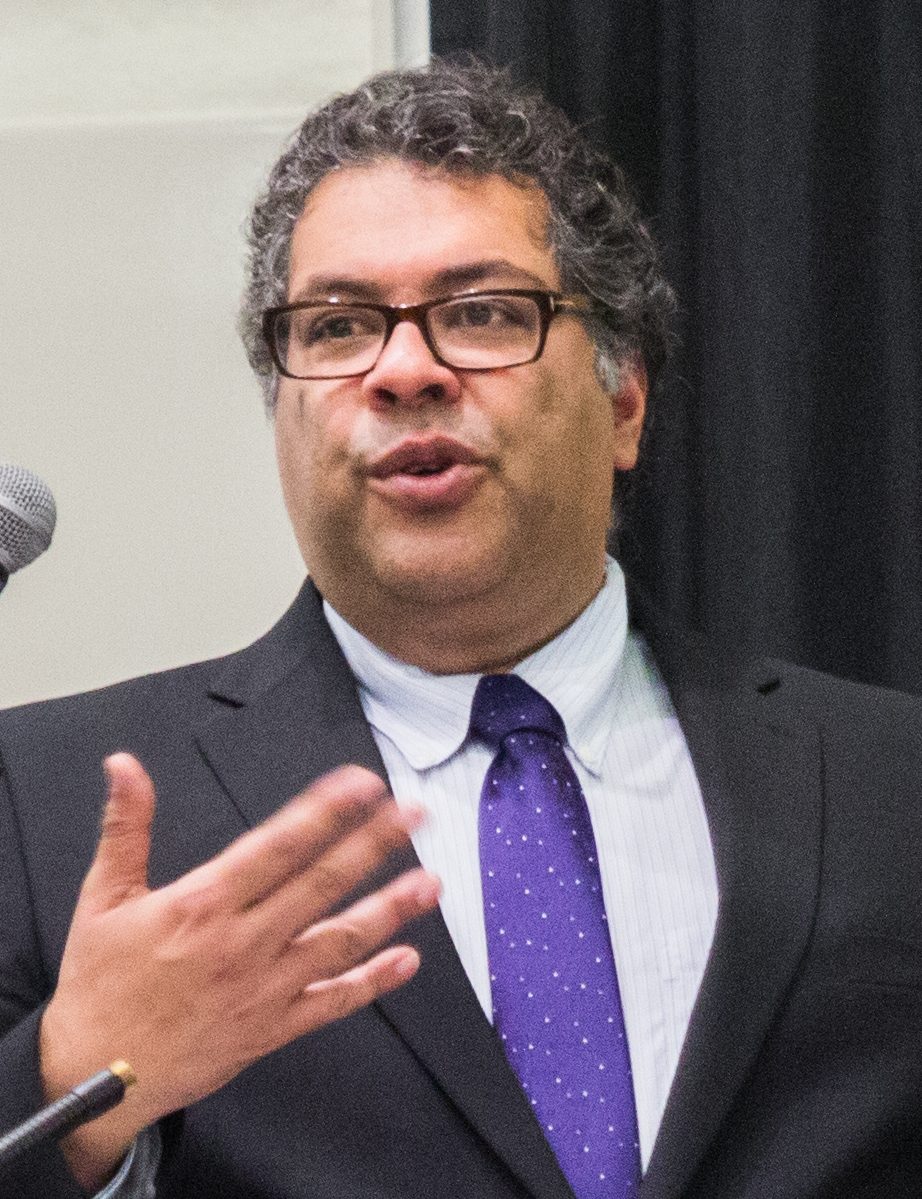

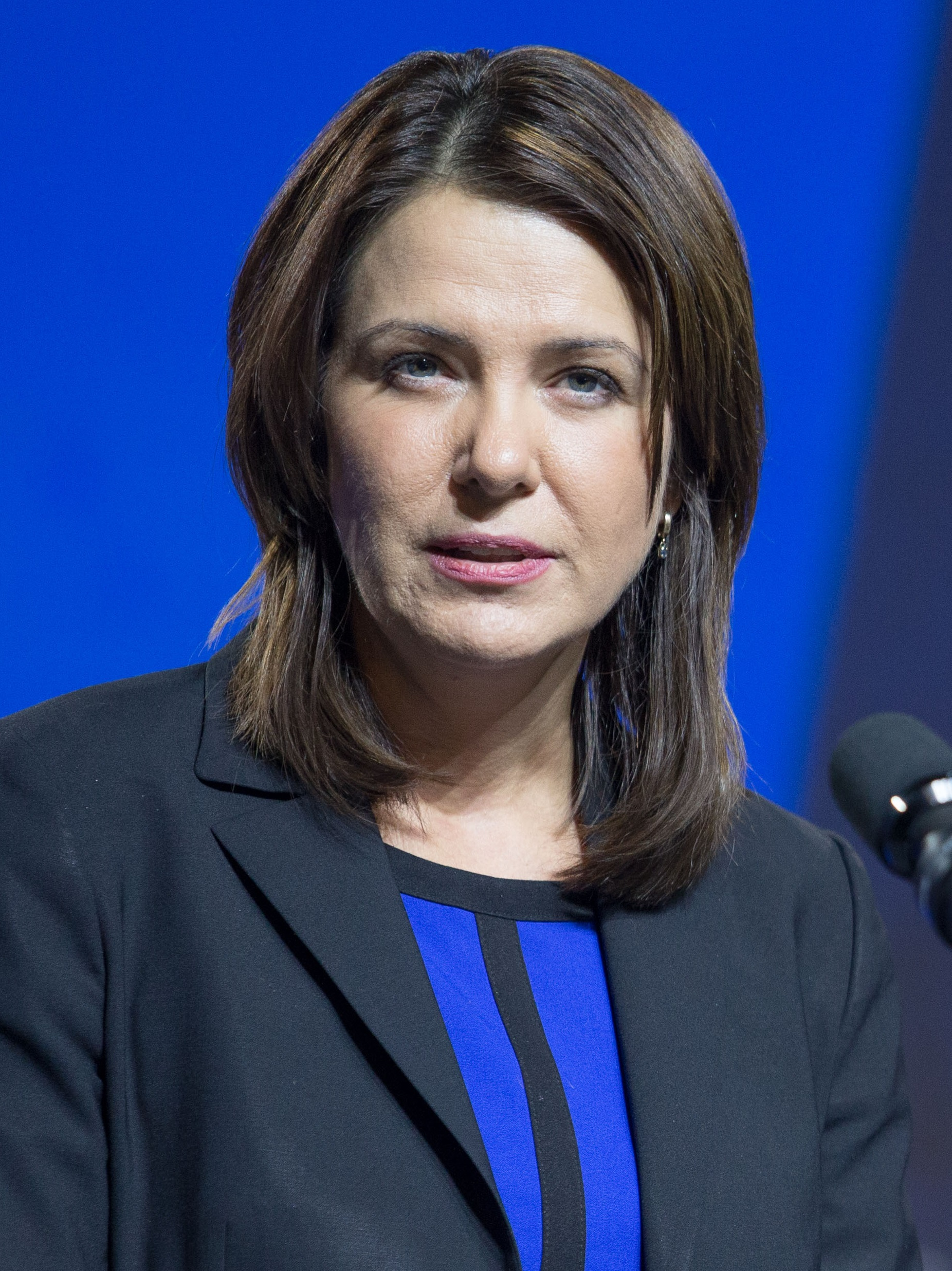
	First party	Second party	Third party
			RPA
Leader	Naheed Nenshi	Danielle Smith	Cameron Davies
Party	New Democratic	United Conservative	Republican
Leader since	June 22, 2024	October 6, 2022	April 11, 2025
Last election	49.73% (Note: Percentage of votes cast in the ridings of Edmonton-Ellerslie, Edmonton-Strathcona, and Olds-Didsbury-Three Hills in the 2023 Alberta general election.)	46.60%	0.18% (Note: Percentage of votes cast in the ridings of Edmonton-Ellerslie, Edmonton-Strathcona, and Olds-Didsbury-Three Hills in the 2023 Alberta general election (when the party was known as the Buffalo Party).)
Seats up	2	1	0
Races won	2	1	0
Seat change	Steady	Steady	Steady
Popular vote	15,340	13,916	3,061
Percentage	45.80%	41.55%	9.14%
Swing	▼3.93%	▼5.05%	▲8.96%
- Seat change summary in the Legislative Assembly
- 87 seats in the Legislative Assembly of Alberta; 44 seats needed for a majority
Party	Leader	Seats	+/–
United Conservative	Danielle Smith	47	+1
New Democratic	Naheed Nenshi	38	+2
Independent	N/A	2	0
This lists parties that won seats. See the complete results below.

Three provincial by-elections were held in the Canadian province of Alberta on June 23, 2025, to fill vacancies in the Legislative Assembly of Alberta.

The by-elections were considered to be important regarding the government of Danielle Smith as well as Alberta separatism.

== Background ==
On May 26, 2025, by-elections were scheduled for the ridings of Edmonton-Ellerslie, Edmonton-Strathcona, and Olds-Didsbury-Three Hills whose MLA's had resigned after taking their seats in the 2023 Alberta general election. The three elections were scheduled for the same day. The elections were scheduled just two months after the 2025 Canadian federal election which brought about an increased interest in Alberta separatism following the Liberal Party of Canada's fourth consecutive electoral victory. The elections also allowed the new Alberta NDP leader Naheed Nenshi an opportunity to take a seat in the Legislative Assembly, after his decision to not stand for election in the previous December 2024 by-election in Lethbridge-West. Nenshi opted to run in Edmonton-Strathcona, the riding of his predecessor Rachel Notley.

In May 2025, the Independence Party of Alberta and the Republican Party of Alberta signed a memorandum of understanding, which sought to advance and unify the independence movement in Alberta. The parties worked together to select candidates who ran under the Republican banner in the 2025 Alberta provincial by-elections.

Seats for election
Seat	Previous MLA	Previous party	Vacant since
Edmonton-Strathcona	Rachel Notley	New Democratic	December 30, 2024
Edmonton-Ellerslie	Rod Loyola	New Democratic	March 25, 2025
Olds-Didsbury-Three Hills	Nathan Cooper	United Conservative	May 22, 2025

== Results by riding ==
Electoral district	Candidates					Incumbent
Electoral district	NDP	UCP	Republican	WLC	Other	Incumbent
Edmonton-Ellerslie (details)	Gurtej Singh Brar; 4,327; 50.84%	Naresh Bhardwaj; 3,239; 38.06%	Fred Munn; 291; 3.42%	Pamela Henson; 41; 0.48%	Manpreet Tiwana (Liberal); 410; 4.82% Caroline Currie (Alberta); 203; 2.39%	Rod Loyola
Edmonton-Strathcona (details)	**Naheed Nenshi**; 7,952; 82.28%	Darby-Rae Crouch; 1,314; 13.60%	Ravina Chand; 65; 0.67%	Jesse Stretch; 24; 0.25%	Don Slater (Liberal); 195; 2.02% Samuel Petrov (Alberta); 115; 1.19%	Rachel Notley
Olds-Didsbury-Three Hills (details)	Beverley Toews; 3,061; 19.98%	Tara Sawyer; 9,363; 61.12%	**Cameron Davies**; 2,705; 17.66%	Bill Tufts; 189; 1.23%	–	Nathan Cooper

Note: Bold indicates party leader.

== See also ==
- 2025 Canadian federal election in Alberta
- 2025 Alberta municipal elections
