= Buffalo Party =

Buffalo Party may refer to:

- Buffalo Party of Alberta, Canada; now known as Republican Party of Alberta
- Buffalo Party of Saskatchewan, Canada
- Buffalo Party, a label used by Byron Brown in the 2021 Buffalo, New York mayoral election
