= Tara Sawyer =

Canadian politician

The Honourable Tara Sawyer ECA MLA

Member of the Legislative Assembly of Alberta for Olds-Didsbury-Three Hills
- Incumbent
- Assumed office June 23, 2025
- Preceded by: Nathan Cooper

Minister of Agriculture and Irrigation
- Incumbent
- Assumed office May 21, 2026
- Premier: Danielle Smith
- Preceded by: RJ Sigurdson

Personal details
- Party: United Conservative
- Profession: Farmer, politician

Tara Sawyer is a Canadian politician from the United Conservative Party. She was elected member of the Legislative Assembly of Alberta for Olds-Didsbury-Three Hills in the 2025 Alberta provincial by-elections. She became Minister of Agriculture and Irrigation in 2026.

Prior to her election, she served as the chair of Grain Growers of Canada.

== Electoral history ==
Alberta provincial by-election, June 23, 2025: Olds-Didsbury-Three Hills Resignation of Nathan Cooper
** Preliminary results — Not yet official **
Party	Candidate	Votes	%	±%
United Conservative	Tara Sawyer	9,363	61.12	-14.17
New Democratic	Beverley Toews	3,061	19.98	+1.18
Republican	Cameron Davies	2,705	17.66	–
Wildrose Loyalty Coalition	Bill Tufts	189	1.23	+0.48
Total valid votes		15,318		
Total rejected ballots				
Turnout				
Eligible voters				
United Conservative hold		Swing		-7.67
Source(s) Source: Elections Alberta
