= Gurtej Singh Brar =

Canadian politician from Alberta

Gurtej Singh Brar MLA

Member of the Legislative Assembly for Edmonton-Ellerslie
- Incumbent
- Assumed office June 23, 2025
- Preceded by: Rod Loyola

Personal details
- Party: New Democratic
- Education: Ashton College

Gurtej Singh Brar is a Canadian politician from the Alberta New Democratic Party who was elected as a Member of the Legislative Assembly of Alberta for Edmonton-Ellerslie in the 2025 Alberta provincial by-elections.

Singh Brar comes from a media background at Ashton College. He is a tech enthusiast who built his first computer from scratch, and he owns a 1,500-book home library that he often shares with his neighbours.

== Electoral record ==
Alberta provincial by-election, June 23, 2025: Edmonton-Ellerslie Resignation of Rod Loyola
** Preliminary results — Not yet official **
Party	Candidate	Votes	%	±%
New Democratic	Gurtej Singh Brar	4,327	50.84	-10.90
United Conservative	Naresh Bhardwaj	3,239	38.06	+1.23
Liberal	Manpreet Tiwana	410	4.82	–
Republican	Fred Munn	291	3.42	–
Alberta Party	Caroline Currie	203	2.39	–
Wildrose Loyalty Coalition	Pamela Henson	41	0.48	-0.94
Total valid votes		8,511		
Total rejected ballots				
Turnout				
Eligible voters				
New Democratic hold		Swing		-6.07
Source(s) Source: Elections Alberta
