= 2025 Canadian federal election in Alberta =

- April 28, 2025

All 37 Albertan seats in the House of Commons
- Registered: 3,234,505
- Turnout: 2,262,524 (70%)
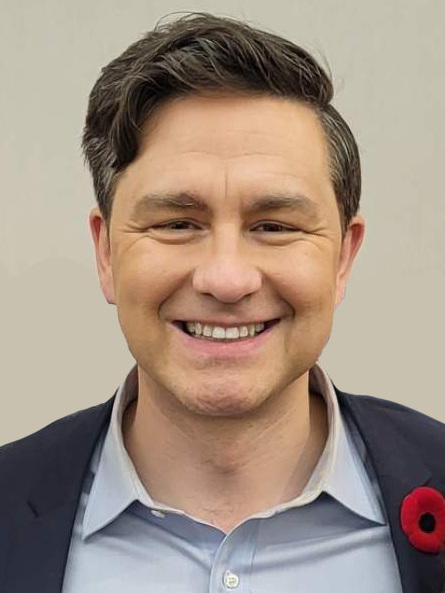

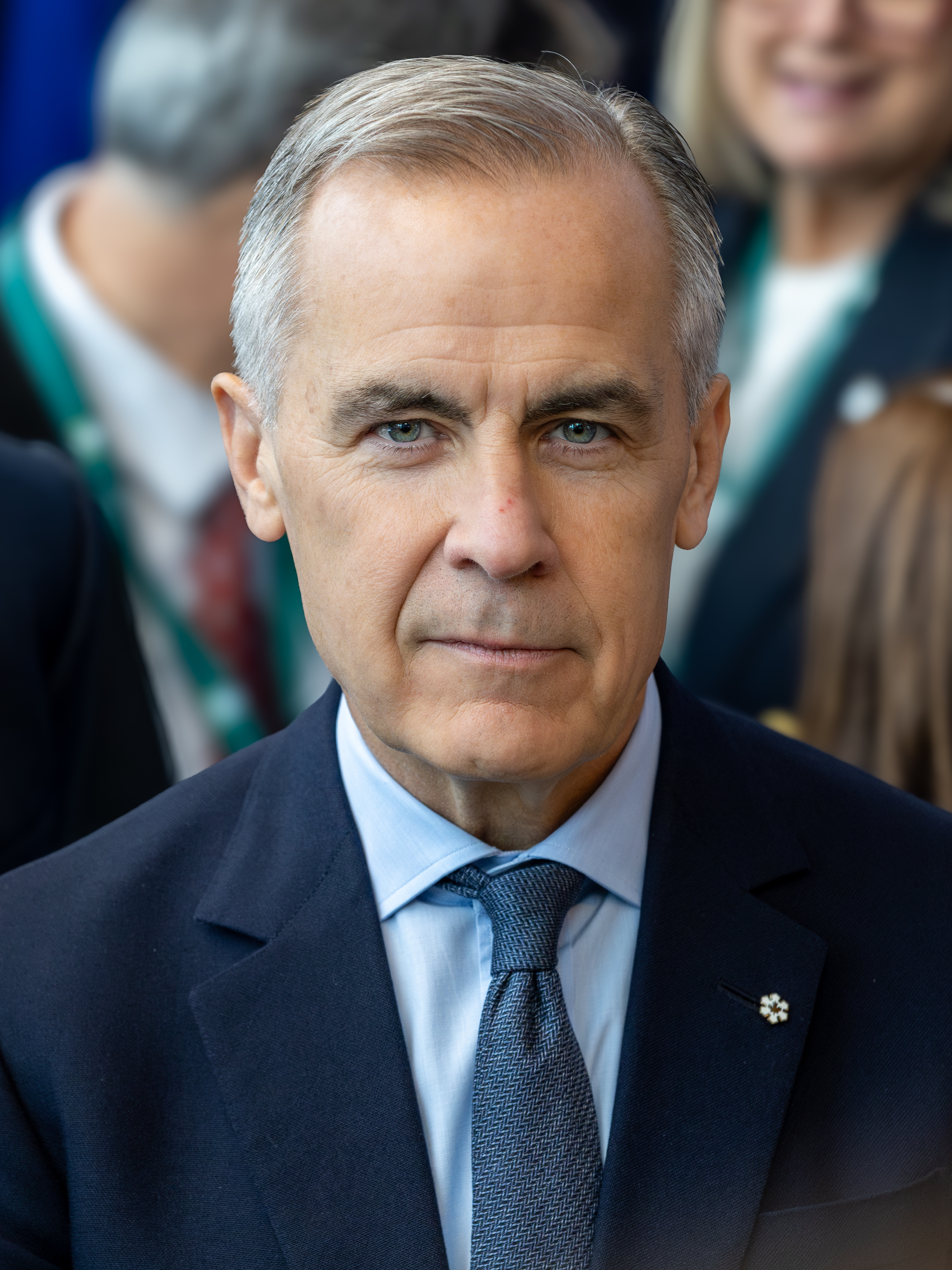

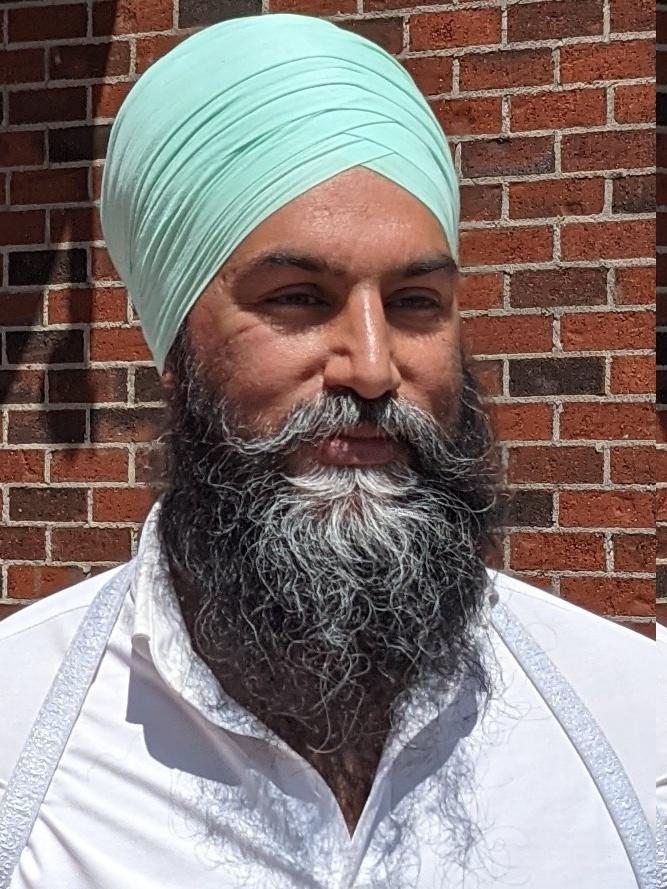
	First party	Second party	Third party
Leader	Pierre Poilievre	Mark Carney	Jagmeet Singh
Party	Conservative	Liberal	New Democratic
Leader since	September 10, 2022	March 9, 2025	October 1, 2017
Last election	30 seats, 55.3%	2 seats, 15.4%	2 seats, 19.1%
Seats before	30	2	2
Seats won	34	2	1
Seat change	▲4	0	▼1
Popular vote	1,436,392	630,442	142,934
Percentage	63.5%	27.9%	6.3%
Swing	▲8.2%	▲12.5%	▼12.8%
Prime minister before election
Mark Carney
Liberal
Prime minister after election
Mark Carney
Liberal

In the 2025 Canadian federal election, 37 members of Parliament were elected to the House of Commons from the province of Alberta making up 10.8% of all members.

== 2022 electoral redistribution ==
The 2025 Canadian federal election was the first election to utilize the electoral districts established following the 2022 Canadian federal electoral redistribution. The House of Commons increased from 338 seats to 343 seats, with Alberta gaining 3 seats in an increase from 34 to 37. This ensures that the average population per constituency in Alberta is 115,206 (according to the 2021 Canadian census), which is 7,358 more people per electoral district than the national average.

2021 results transposed onto 2023 boundaries
Party	MPs		
Party	2021 actual result	2021 notional result	Change
Conservative	30	34	▲4
New Democratic	2	2	0
Liberal	2	1	▼1
Total seats	34	37	3 ▲

== Timeline ==
Changes in Albertan seats held (2021–2025)
Seat	Before				Change		
Seat	Date	Member	Party	Reason	Date	Member	Party
Calgary Heritage	December 12, 2022	Bob Benzen	█ Conservative	Resigned seat	July 24, 2023	Shuvaloy Majumdar	█ Conservative

== Predictions ==
Polling firm	Last date of polling	Link	LPC	CPC	NDP	GPC	PPC	Others	Margin of error (Note: In cases when linked poll details distinguish between the margin of error associated with the total sample of respondents (including undecided and non-voters) and that of the subsample of decided/leaning voters, the former is included in the table. Also not included is the margin of error created by rounding to the nearest whole number or any margin of error from methodological sources. Most online polls (because of their opt-in method of recruiting panelists which results in a non-random sample) cannot have a margin of error. In such cases, shown is what the margin of error would be for a survey using a random probability-based sample of equivalent size.)	Sample size (Note: Refers to the total, "raw" sample size, including undecided and non-voters, and before demographic weighting is applied. Fractions in parentheses apply to rolling polls (see below) and indicate the proportion of the sample that is independent from the previous poll in the series.)	Polling method (Note: "Telephone" refers to traditional telephone polls conducted by live interviewers; "IVR" refers to automated Interactive Voice Response polls conducted by telephone; "online" refers to polls conducted exclusively over the internet; "telephone/online" refers to polls which combine results from both telephone and online surveys, or for which respondents are initially recruited by telephone and then asked to complete an online survey. "Rolling" polls contain overlapping data from one poll to the next.)	Lead
Leger	January 26, 2025		14	64	16	3	2	1	± 3.1 pp	1,002	Online	48
Leger	August 5, 2024		14	61	18	3	2	1	± 3.1 pp	1,005	Online	43
Leger	March 24, 2024		14	60	20	3	2	1	± 3.1 pp	1,002	Online	40
Mainstreet Research	May 2, 2023		18	55	13	1	3	1	± 2.5 pp	1,524	Smart IVR	37
Yorkville Strategies	March 9, 2022		18	48	20	4	7	3	± 4 pp	600	Phone	28

=== Summary ===
Source	Ranking			
Source	Con	Lib	NDP	As of
338Canada	31	5	1	23 April 2025

== Results ==
=== Summary ===
The Conservative Party won a significant majority of seats and votes, taking 34 ridings, and winning 63.5% of the popular vote. The Liberal Party came in a distant second, with 2 seats, receiving 27.9% of the popular vote. The NDP fell to a distant third. They received 6.3% of the popular vote, and lost half their seats, securing 1.

The People's Party still won no seats, and saw their support collapse to 0.9% of the vote. The Green party won no seats and their popular vote fell to just 0.4%.

Unlike the 2021 Canadian federal election, the Alberta-based Maverick Party did not contest the 2025 federal election due to them being deregistered by Elections Canada on February 28, 2025.

The Centrist Party, Canadian Future Party, the Christian Heritage Party, the Communist Party, the Libertarian Party, the Marxist-Leninist Party, the United Party of Canada and the Rhino Party, all ran at least one candidate in Alberta in this election and got a combined 0.6% of the vote.

Albertan summary seat results in the 2025 Canadian federal election
Party	Votes	Vote %	Vote +/-	Seats	Seat +/-
Conservative	1,436,392	63.5%	▲8.2pp	34 / 37 (92%)	▲4
Liberal	630,442	27.9%	▲12.5pp	2 / 37 (5%)	Steady
New Democratic	142,934	6.3%	▼12.8pp	1 / 37 (3%)	▼1
People's	20,257	0.9%	▼6.5pp	0 / 37 (0%)	Steady
Green	10,103	0.4%	▼0.5pp	0 / 37 (0%)	Steady
Independent	7,781	0.3%	▼ pp	0 / 37 (0%)	Steady
Other	14,615	0.6%	▼ pp	0 / 37 (0%)	Steady
Total	2,262,524	100%	–	37 / 37 (100%)	▲3 (Note: Alberta gained 3 seats in the electoral redistribution.)
Seat apportionment diagram:

=== Comparison with national results ===
Results by party
Party	Popular vote %			Seats in caucus
Party	AB	Natl.	diff.	Seats in caucus
Conservative	63.5	41.3	+22.2	34 / 144 (24%)
Liberal	27.9	43.7	-15.8	2 / 169 (1%)
New Democratic	6.3	6.3	=	1 / 7 (14%)
People's	0.9	0.7	+0.2	no caucus
Green	0.4	1.2	-0.8	0 / 1 (0%)
Total	–	–	–	37 / 343 (11%)

== Student vote results ==
Student votes are mock elections that run parallel to actual elections, in which students not of voting age participate. They are administered by Student Vote Canada. These are for educational purposes and do not count towards the results.

Summary of the 2025 Canadian Student Vote in Alberta
Party	Leader	Seats			Popular vote		
Party	Leader	Elected	%	Δ	Votes	%	Δ (pp)
Conservative	Pierre Poilievre	32	86.49	▲10	98,989	47.15	▲10.52
Liberal	Mark Carney	4	10.81	▲4	50,669	24.31	▲8.15
New Democratic	Jagmeet Singh	1	2.70	▼11	29,946	14.26	▼13.17
Other		0	0	Steady	12,559	5.80	▼0.26
Green	Elizabeth May & Jonathan Pedneault	0	0	0	10,102	4.81	▼1.45
People's	Maxime Bernier	0	0	Steady	7,701	3.67	▼3.79
Total		37	100.00	▲3	209,966	100.00	–
Source: Student Vote Canada

== See also ==
- Results of the 2025 Canadian federal election by riding
- Canadian federal election results in Calgary
- Canadian federal election results in Edmonton and environs
- Canadian federal election results in rural Alberta
- 2025 Alberta provincial by-elections
- 2025 Alberta municipal elections
- 2026 Alberta referendum
- 2026 Alberta independence referendum
