= 2026 Alberta independence referendum =

Canadian provincial referendum

- October 19, 2026
- Should Alberta remain a province of Canada, or should the Government of Alberta commence the legal process required under the Canadian Constitution to hold a binding provincial referendum on whether or not Alberta should separate from Canada?

Results
Choice	Votes	%
Remain	1,556,316	74.95%
Referendum	520,233	25.05%
Valid votes	2,076,549	93.69%
Invalid or blank votes	139,956	6.31%
Total votes	2,216,505	100.00%
Registered voters/turnout	3,148,205	70.4%
- Results by provincial riding

The independence question of the 2026 Alberta referendum was one of 10 questions of the 2026 Alberta referendum election, which took place on October 19, 2026. The question was a choice of two options: whether to remain in Canada or for the province of Alberta to take steps toward holding a binding (Note: Although this potential second referendum would be binding in the sense that it would compel the Government of Alberta to seek independence from Canada, it would not immediately bring about an actual recognition of independence, as the Constitution of Canada does not have any provision allowing for a province to unilaterally separate from Canada. This means the Government of Alberta would only be able to seek a constitutional amendment to make unilateral separation legal, following the process outlined in the Clarity Act.) referendum on separating from Canada.

== Background ==
Location of Alberta in Canada

In late 2025, the premier of Alberta Danielle Smith had been under pressure to call a referendum on separation. Under the existing legislation at the time, Citizen Initiative Act (CIA) Section 2(4) prohibited unconstitutional citizen proposals. On December 11, 2025, the UCP-dominated Legislative Assembly of Alberta passed legislation deleting Section 2(4) from the act. This paved the way for a separatist referendum, which would have not previously been possible. The province's Citizen Initiative Act does enable a group of citizens to force the government to hold a referendum. The Election Statutes Amendment Act, which had come into force on July 4, 2025, reduced the threshold of signatures needed for a referendum from 10% of all eligible electors to 10% of votes cast in the previous provincial election and also lengthened the time to obtain signatures from 90 days to 120 days, making citizen initiatives more viable. Knowing the situation and in order to preempt the discussion, Thomas Lukaszuk and others in favour of Alberta remaining in Canada collected signatures to force a referendum on Alberta remaining in Canada. The presentation of the question on the petition was nuanced—one size of lettering was used for one part: "we as represented by the signatory and applicant below propose a referendum on the following question:"; then bolder lettering was used for this part: "Do you agree that Alberta should remain in Canada?"

=== Petition controversy ===
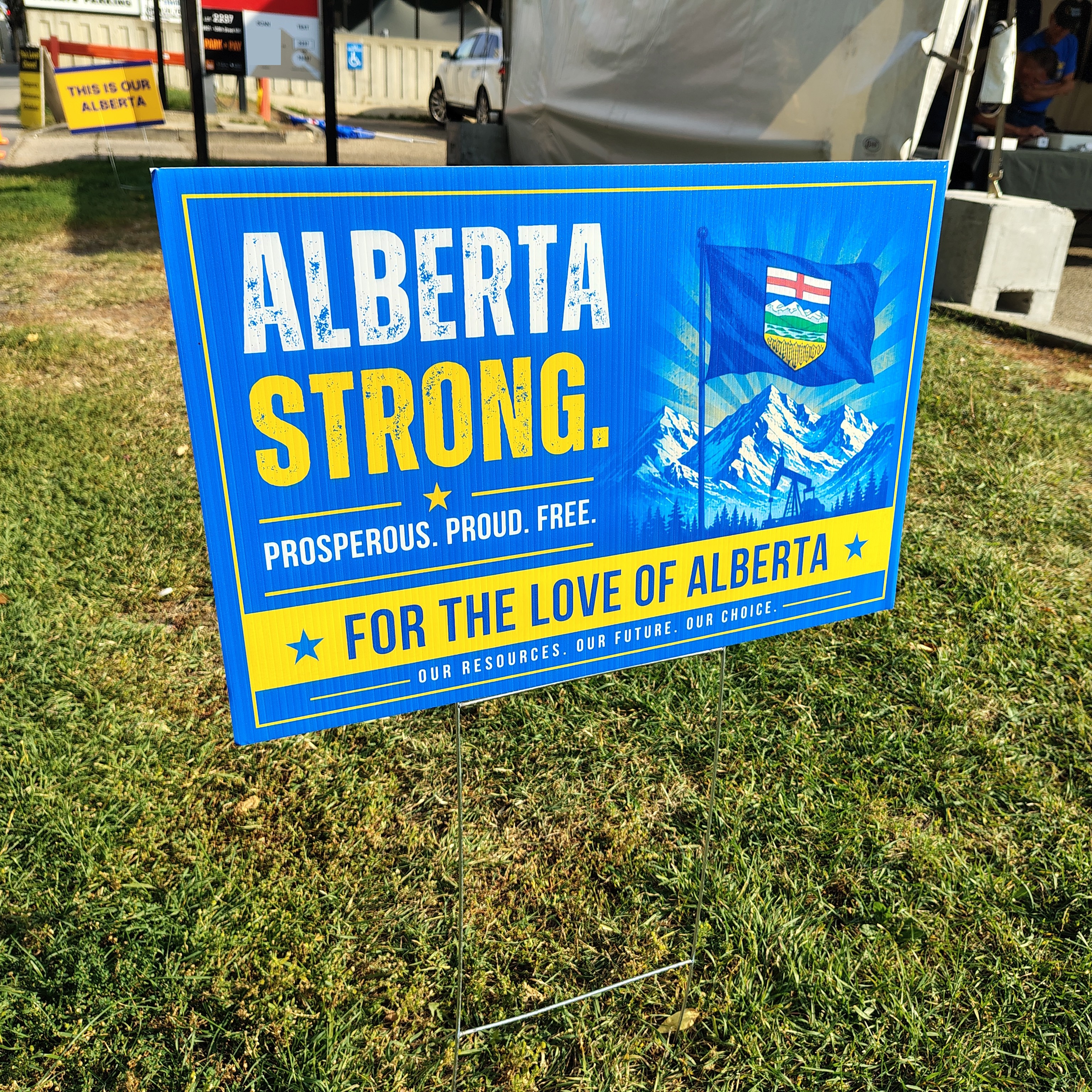
An Alberta Prosperity Project lawn sign near the Alberta Legislature Building

A pro-remain, anti-referendum sign

After Thomas Lukaszuk's petition drive had begun, on May 25, 2025, the Legislative Assembly passed an amendment to the Citizen Initiative Act, which greatly lowered the threshold required for a petition to trigger a referendum.

Stay Free Alberta collected signatures on a petition in support of an independence referendum. They claimed the petition had received 300,000 signatures. However, some questioned the credibility of this petition, once it was revealed that separatist groups had gained access to the Elections Alberta List of Electors, after the personal information of millions of Albertans appeared in an online database operated by the Centurion Project, another separatist group.

On May 13, 2026, the Court of King's Bench of Alberta struck down the petition after it was argued that the separatist groups had not properly consulted with Indigenous peoples in Alberta, which was considered to be a constitutional requirement given the implications that separation would have on treaty rights. Danielle Smith criticized the ruling as being undemocratic, and claimed that a Justin Trudeau-appointed judge was undermining the democratic will of Albertans. She also claimed that her government was prepared to utilize the notwithstanding clause to prevent the courts from being able to intervene. After another judge ruled that Elections Alberta should proceed with signature verification for the separatist petition, in case an appeal of the May 13 ruling was successful, the petition was verified as having received almost 223,000 signatures.

The petition in support of Alberta remaining in Canada organized by Thomas Lukaszuk was verified by Elections Alberta to have received over 400,000 signatures.

=== Addition of the question ===
On May 21, 2026, Smith announced in a televised address that a remain/separate question would be added to the nine questions listed for the October vote. It incorporated the Thomas Lukaszuk's "Alberta Forever Canada" question, and in order to circumvent the court ruling against a vote on separation, the new referendum question also set out that if the leave vote won, it would not compel the government to seek separation from Canada, but instead would open the door to a subsequent referendum on remaining in Canada or independence. Smith argued that this question in the form of an A or B choice respected the wishes of both the separatist groups and the pro-Canada campaigns, although those on both sides of the debate criticized it.

The final question read (in the style of a "pick one" choice): Should Alberta remain a province of Canada, or should the Government of Alberta commence the legal process required under the Canadian Constitution to hold a binding provincial referendum on whether or not Alberta should separate from Canada?

=== Alleged foreign interference ===
On October 3, 2026, a Globe and Mail investigation found that political operatives tied to the American Republican Party were assisting the campaign for Alberta to secede. The investigation also found that when Alberta separatist leaders went to Washington, D.C., to meet with representatives of the United States Department of State, they were offered access to fresh water and royalties on crude oil. A few days later, Mitch Sylvestre, chief executive officer of the Alberta Prosperity Project, told the Mail that the office of Foreign Influence Transparency Commissioner Anton Boegman contacted him and his group. The premier of British Columbia, David Eby, called the invitation of foreign interference by the separatist movement "treason" and other Canadian lawmakers called for updating Canadian laws on treason and foreign election interference.

Later that month, Researchers from the Centre for Artificial Intelligence, Data, and Conflict at the University of Regina found out that 80 per cent of suspected foreign influence activity had been linked to Russian sources and 20 per cent has been linked to US sources initially. However, researchers noticed that the American share rose to 24 per cent, while the Russian sources dropped to 76 per cent. The report points out that Russian content is covert and can be traced to a pro-Kremlin content farm known as Pravda Network. Meanwhile, US activity is more overt, with prominent American influencers, podcasts and websites promoting Alberta separation on a variety of platforms including YouTube, Reddit, and Rumble. Dr. Brian McQuinn, co-director of the centre, said the narratives targeting Alberta from Russian and American-linked sources have started to mirror each other as the referendum neared.

== Opinion polls ==
From May 2026 to the scheduled referendum date.

The following table shows responses to the question posed in the 2026 referendum. Polling on whether Alberta should separate from Canada, rather than on whether a future referendum on separation should be held, can be found in the article on Alberta separatism.

Date(s) conducted	Remain in Canada	Hold Separation Referendum	Undecided	Lead (pp)	Sample	Pollster	Polling type	Margin of error	Notes
October 16–18, 2026	74%	22%	4%	52	811	Research Co.	Online	±3.6%	
October 15–16, 2026	65.6%	34.4%	N/A	31.2	825	Mainstreet	IVR	±3.4%	
October 14–16, 2026	74%	21%	4%	53	1,000	Leger	Online	±3.1%	
October 13–16, 2026	70%	23%	7%	47	801	Ipsos	Online	±4.2%	
October 13–15, 2026	66% (Note: Alberta New Democratic Party 99%, United Conservative Party 37%)	34% (Note: Alberta New Democratic Party 1%, United Conservative Party 63%)	N/A	34	1,010	Angus Reid	Online	±3%	
October 2–15, 2026	73%	23%	3%	50	1,347	Pollara	Online	±2.7%	Would not vote 1%
October 7–13, 2026	68%	24%	8%	44	1,021	Abacus Data	Online	±3.1%	
October 2–4, 2026	70% (Note: Alberta New Democratic Party 98%, United Conservative Party 43%)	22% (Note: Alberta New Democratic Party 1%, United Conservative Party 48%)	7% (Note: United Conservative Party 8%)	48	1,001	Leger	Online	±3.1%	
September 18–22, 2026	70%	20%	10%	50	600	Ipsos	Online	±4.9%	
September 8–21, 2026	72%	23%	4%	49	1,200	Janet Brown	Telephone/Online	±2.8%	
September 4–7, 2026	64%	24%	9%	40	1,000	Abacus Data	Online	±3.1%	
August 24–26, 2026	74%	22%	4%	52	750	Research Co.	Online	±3.6%	
August 21–23, 2026	65% (Note: Alberta New Democratic Party 93%, United Conservative Party 42%)	23% (Note: Alberta New Democratic Party 4%, United Conservative Party 45%)	10% (Note: Alberta New Democratic Party 2%, United Conservative Party 12%)	42	1,001	Leger	Online	±3.1%	
August 10–13, 2026	61% (Note: Alberta New Democratic Party 92%, United Conservative Party 35%)	33% (Note: Alberta New Democratic Party 6%, United Conservative Party 60%)	5%	28	1,017	Angus Reid	Online	±3%	
June 19–July 2, 2026	70%	23%	7%	46	1,007	Pollara	Online	±3.1%	
June 7–12, 2026	65%	21%	9%	44	777	Spark	Online	N/A	Won't Vote 5%
May 29–June 1, 2026	68% (Note: Alberta New Democratic Party 94%, United Conservative Party 44%)	24% (Note: Alberta New Democratic Party 5%, United Conservative Party 48%)	8% (Note: Alberta New Democratic Party 1%, United Conservative Party 8%)	44	1,014	Leger	Online	±3.1%	
May 28–June 1, 2026	72%	19%	10%	53	600	Ipsos	Online	±4.9%	
May 22–24, 2026	60% (Note: Alberta New Democratic Party 90%, United Conservative Party 30%)	35% (Note: Alberta New Democratic Party 7%, United Conservative Party 64%)	5%	25	800	Angus Reid	Online	±3%	

== Result ==
Question 10
Choice	Votes	%
Remain	1,556,316	74.95
Referendum	520,233	25.05
Total	2,076,549	100.00
Valid votes	2,076,549	93.69
Invalid/blank votes	139,956	6.31
Total votes	2,216,505	100.00
Registered voters/turnout	3,148,204	70.4
Source: Elections Alberta

=== By electoral district ===
2026 Alberta independence referendum results by provincial riding

2026 Alberta independence referendum results by voting area

Electoral district	Remain		Referendum		Total
Electoral district	Votes	%	Votes	%	Total
Calgary-Acadia	19,558	81.08	4,563	18.92	24,121
Calgary-Beddington	18,585	82.48	3,949	17.52	22,534
Calgary-Bow	23,661	81.47	5,383	18.53	29,044
Calgary-Buffalo	20,880	85.48	3,546	14.52	24,426
Calgary-Cross	13,070	84.19	2,455	15.81	15,525
Calgary-Currie	20,744	84.51	3,803	15.49	24,547
Calgary-East	13,058	79.09	3,452	20.91	16,510
Calgary-Edgemont	21,229	83.32	4,249	16.68	25,478
Calgary-Elbow	23,107	85.24	4,000	14.76	27,107
Calgary-Falconridge	13,010	85.68	2,175	14.32	15,185
Calgary-Fish Creek	21,651	79.75	5,496	20.25	27,147
Calgary-Foothills	22,707	83.11	4,615	16.89	27,322
Calgary-Glenmore	22,042	82.50	4,677	17.50	26,719
Calgary-Hays	19,745	77.98	5,574	22.02	25,319
Calgary-Klein	18,461	82.23	3,989	17.77	22,450
Calgary-Lougheed	16,612	78.85	4,457	21.15	21,069
Calgary-Bhullar-McCall	11,746	89.32	1,405	10.68	13,151
Calgary-Mountain View	25,209	87.99	3,442	12.01	28,651
Calgary-North	17,132	83.89	3,289	16.11	20,421
Calgary-North East	22,103	85.18	3,847	14.82	25,950
Calgary-North West	22,795	82.35	4,885	17.65	27,680
Calgary-Peigan	18,948	79.41	4,914	20.59	23,862
Calgary-Shaw	25,077	77.96	7,091	22.04	32,168
Calgary-South East	24,587	76.73	7,455	23.27	32,042
Calgary-Varsity	21,794	86.05	3,533	13.95	25,327
Calgary-West	20,634	81.61	4,649	18.39	25,283
Edmonton-Beverly-Clareview	14,590	82.01	3,201	17.99	17,791
Edmonton-Castle Downs	18,467	84.08	3,496	15.92	21,963
Edmonton-City Centre	17,515	89.39	2,078	10.61	19,593
Edmonton-Decore	13,444	82.48	2,855	17.52	16,299
Edmonton-Ellerslie	19,759	84.34	3,670	15.66	23,429
Edmonton-Glenora	18,880	87.76	2,633	12.24	21,513
Edmonton-Gold Bar	22,502	87.20	3,304	12.80	25,806
Edmonton-Highlands-Norwood	14,209	86.06	2,301	13.94	16,510
Edmonton-Manning	19,332	82.66	4,056	17.34	23,388
Edmonton-McClung	16,033	84.91	2,850	15.09	18,883
Edmonton-Meadows	17,921	85.50	3,040	14.50	20,961
Edmonton-Mill Woods	17,001	82.84	3,521	17.16	20,522
Edmonton-North West	17,860	86.01	2,904	13.99	20,764
Edmonton-Riverview	20,116	88.19	2,695	11.81	22,811
Edmonton-Rutherford	19,107	87.45	2,743	12.55	21,850
Edmonton-South	26,954	84.52	4,936	15.48	31,890
Edmonton-South West	29,298	82.78	6,095	17.22	35,393
Edmonton-Strathcona	19,259	90.72	1,969	9.28	21,228
Edmonton-West Henday	22,939	83.97	4,380	16.03	27,319
Edmonton-Whitemud	20,851	87.17	3,070	12.83	23,921
Airdrie-Cochrane	29,654	71.31	11,929	28.69	41,583
Airdrie-East	21,408	70.65	8,892	29.35	30,300
Athabasca-Barrhead-Westlock	13,735	58.63	9,691	41.37	23,426
Banff-Kananaskis	22,977	80.11	5,705	19.89	28,682
Bonnyville-Cold Lake-St. Paul	12,777	58.63	9,017	41.37	21,794
Brooks-Medicine Hat	13,940	63.17	8,126	36.83	22,066
Camrose	14,445	63.72	8,225	36.28	22,670
Cardston-Siksika	9,814	57.15	7,358	42.85	17,172
Central Peace-Notley	6,409	49.54	6,528	50.46	12,937
Chestermere-Strathmore	19,607	69.06	8,786	30.94	28,393
Cypress-Medicine Hat	16,925	68.25	7,872	31.75	24,797
Drayton Valley-Devon	14,085	54.83	11,603	45.17	25,688
Drumheller-Stettler	10,364	51.65	9,700	48.35	20,064
Fort McMurray-Lac La Biche	8,726	60.20	5,770	39.80	14,496
Fort McMurray-Wood Buffalo	7,750	59.36	5,307	40.64	13,057
Fort Saskatchewan-Vegreville	18,711	66.87	9,272	33.13	27,983
Grande Prairie	12,147	62.03	7,437	37.97	19,584
Grande Prairie-Wapiti	12,225	52.46	11,079	47.54	23,304
Highwood	20,291	64.98	10,935	35.02	31,226
Innisfail-Sylvan Lake	15,318	56.95	11,580	43.05	26,898
Lac Ste. Anne-Parkland	15,512	57.98	11,244	42.02	26,756
Lacombe-Ponoka	14,190	57.58	10,455	42.42	24,645
Leduc-Beaumont	20,796	70.75	8,598	29.25	29,394
Lesser Slave Lake	7,002	69.96	3,007	30.04	10,009
Lethbridge-East	18,883	79.02	5,013	20.98	23,896
Lethbridge-West	21,497	81.22	4,972	18.78	26,469
Livingstone-Macleod	17,582	62.93	10,358	37.07	27,940
Maskwacis-Wetaskiwin	13,926	64.57	7,642	35.43	21,568
Morinville-St. Albert	22,178	74.23	7,700	25.77	29,878
Olds-Didsbury-Three Hills	15,213	55.38	12,258	44.62	27,471
Peace River	8,570	57.87	6,240	42.13	14,810
Red Deer-North	14,919	69.74	6,472	30.26	21,391
Red Deer-South	18,948	70.70	7,852	29.30	26,800
Rimbey-Rocky Mountain House-Sundre	12,220	49.06	12,687	50.94	24,907
Sherwood Park	24,412	80.89	5,768	19.11	30,180
Spruce Grove-Stony Plain	22,528	71.93	8,792	28.07	31,320
St. Albert	25,036	83.19	5,058	16.81	30,094
Strathcona-Sherwood Park	21,857	73.82	7,750	26.18	29,607
Taber-Warner	9,974	53.80	8,565	46.20	18,539
Vermilion-Lloydminster-Wainwright	11,737	56.90	8,891	43.10	20,628
West Yellowhead	13,846	59.54	9,409	40.46	23,255
Total	1,556,316	74.95	520,233	25.05	2,076,549
Source: Elections Alberta

== Reactions ==
Shortly after midnight on October 20, Danielle Smith stated that she was "very pleased to see the initial results from Elections Alberta show widespread support for remaining in Canada" and that "Albertans have voted for a stronger Alberta in a united Canada". That evening, Danielle Smith held a public address in which she promised not to hold a second referendum on independence. In a video sent to members of the United Conservative Party on October 21, she said that the party was not in favour of Alberta separatism and that members of the party in favour of independence should "join a different party".

On October 20, Mark Carney described the referendum result as a "great result for Canada" and that he was "thrilled that Albertans have chosen unity".

Pierre Poilievre, the Leader of the Official Opposition, stated that "Albertans have decisively voted for a stronger Alberta within a united Canada".

== See also ==
- 2026 Alberta referendum
- 1980 Quebec referendum
- 1995 Quebec referendum
- 2021 Canadian federal election in Alberta
- 2025 Canadian federal election in Alberta
- 2026 Canadian electoral calendar
- Alberta separatism
- Politics of Alberta
- Western alienation
- Quebec separatism
