= 2025 Edmonton-Strathcona provincial by-election =

By-election in Alberta, Canada

- June 23, 2025

Riding of Edmonton-Strathcona
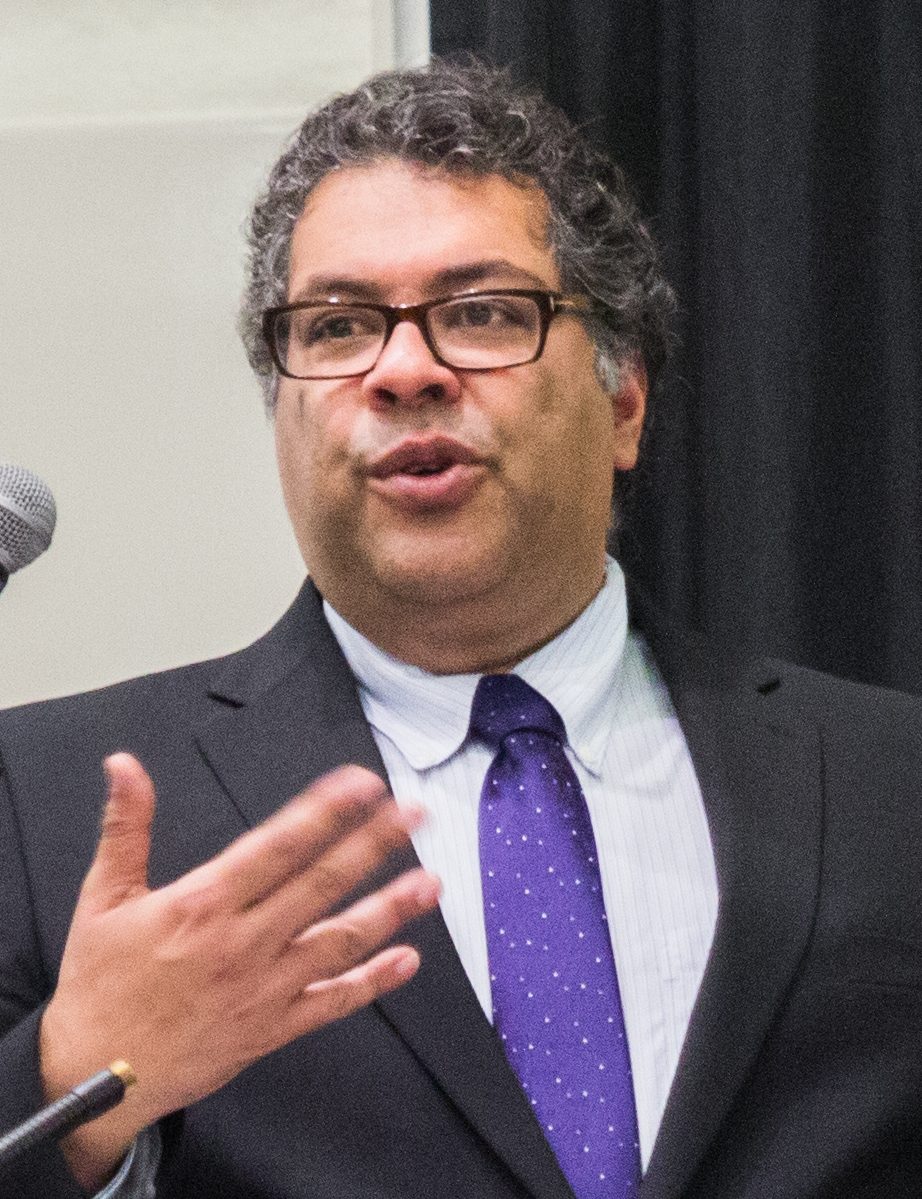
	First party	Second party
		UCP
Candidate	Naheed Nenshi	Darby Crouch
Party	New Democratic	United Conservative
Popular vote	7,952	1,314
Percentage	82.28%	13.60%
Swing	▲2.55pp	▼3.70pp
MLA before election
Rachel Notley
New Democratic
Elected MLA
Naheed Nenshi
New Democratic

A by-election was held on June 23, 2025, in the Alberta provincial riding of Edmonton-Strathcona to replace Rachel Notley, the former premier of Alberta and the former leader of the Alberta New Democratic Party, following her resignation on December 30, 2024. The election occurred alongside two other provincial by-elections in Edmonton-Ellerslie and Olds-Didsbury-Three Hills. Naheed Nenshi, the leader of the New Democratic Party since June 22, 2024, won the by-election and became the leader of the Opposition in the Alberta Legislative Assembly.

== Candidates ==
Candidate	Party	Date nominated	Notes
Naheed Nenshi	New Democratic	January 22, 2025	Leader of the New Democratic Party, former mayor of Calgary.
Darby Crouch	United Conservative	April 6, 2025	
Jesse Stretch	Wildrose Loyalty Coalition	May 28, 2025	
Samuel Petrov	Alberta Party	March 24, 2025	
Don Slater	Liberal	June 4, 2025	
Ravina Chand	Republican	May 17, 2025	

== Result ==
Alberta provincial by-election, June 23, 2025: Edmonton-Strathcona Resignation of Rachel Notley
Party	Candidate	Votes	%	±%
New Democratic	Naheed Nenshi	7,952	82.28	+2.55
United Conservative	Darby-Rae Crouch	1,314	13.60	-3.70
Liberal	Don Slater	195	2.02	–
Alberta Party	Samuel Petrov	115	1.19	–
Republican	Ravina Chand	65	0.67	+0.07 (Note: Change from the Buffalo Party, who rebranded to the Republican Party in 2025.)
Wildrose Loyalty Coalition	Jesse Stretch	24	0.25	-0.28
Total valid votes		9,665		
Total rejected ballots				
Turnout				
Eligible voters				
New Democratic hold		Swing		+3.13
Source(s) Source: Elections Alberta

== Previous result ==
2023 Alberta general election: Edmonton-Strathcona
Party	Candidate	Votes	%	±%
New Democratic	Rachel Notley	13,980	79.73	+7.63
United Conservative	Emad El-Zein	3,032	17.29	+0.25
Green	Robert Gooding-Townsend	324	1.85	+0.74
Buffalo	Andrew Jacobson	106	0.60	–
Wildrose Loyalty Coalition	Robert Nielsen	93	0.53	–
Total		17,535	98.56	–
Rejected and declined		257	1.44	+0.53
Turnout		17,792	59.62	-5.40
Eligible voters		29,841		
New Democratic hold		Swing		+3.69
Source(s) Source: Elections Alberta

== See also ==
- 31st Alberta Legislature
- 2025 Alberta provincial by-elections
  - 2025 Edmonton-Ellerslie provincial by-election
  - 2025 Olds-Didsbury-Three Hills provincial by-election
- 2025 Battle River—Crowfoot federal by-election
