= 2025 Olds-Didsbury-Three Hills provincial by-election =

- June 23, 2025

Riding of Olds-Didsbury-Three Hills
	First party	Second party	Third party
	UCP	NDP	RPA
Candidate	Tara Sawyer	Bev Toews	Cam Davies
Party	United Conservative	New Democratic	Republican
Popular vote	9,363	3,061	2,705
Percentage	61.12%	19.98%	17.66%
Swing	▼14.17pp	▲1.18pp	N/A
MLA before election
Nathan Cooper
United Conservative
Elected MLA
Tara Sawyer
United Conservative

A by-election took place on June 23, 2025 in the Albertan provincial riding of Olds-Didsbury-Three Hills to replace Nathan Cooper. It was held on the same day as byelections in Edmonton-Strathcona and Edmonton-Ellerslie.

The by-election was held following Nathan Cooper's resignation as MLA upon being appointed as Alberta's representative in Washington beginning in June 2025.

== Candidates ==
Candidate	Party
Tara Sawyer	United Conservative
Bev Toews	New Democratic
Bill Tufts	Wildrose Loyalty Coalition
Cameron Davies	Republican

Former MLA for Olds-Didsbury, Gordon Kesler endorsed the Republican Party and Cameron Davies. He is known for being elected in 1982, in a by-election under the separatist Western Canada Concept party.

== Result ==
Alberta provincial by-election, June 23, 2025: Olds-Didsbury-Three Hills Resignation of Nathan Cooper
** Preliminary results — Not yet official **
Party	Candidate	Votes	%	±%
United Conservative	Tara Sawyer	9,363	61.12	-14.17
New Democratic	Beverley Toews	3,061	19.98	+1.18
Republican	Cameron Davies	2,705	17.66	–
Wildrose Loyalty Coalition	Bill Tufts	189	1.23	+0.48
Total valid votes		15,318		
Total rejected ballots				
Turnout				
Eligible voters				
United Conservative hold		Swing		-7.67
Source(s) Source: Elections Alberta

== Previous result ==
2023 Alberta general election: Olds-Didsbury-Three Hills
Party	Candidate	Votes	%	±%
United Conservative	Nathan Cooper	18,228	75.29	-3.26
New Democratic	Cheryl Hunter Loewen	4,553	18.81	+7.05
Alberta Independence	Katherine Kowalchuk	1,140	4.71	–
Wildrose Loyalty Coalition	Cam Tatlock	183	0.76	–
Solidarity Movement	Judy Bridges	105	0.43	–
Total		24,209	98.82	–
Rejected and declined		288	1.18	+0.72
Turnout		24,497	64.17	
Eligible voters		38,173		
United Conservative hold		Swing		-5.16
Source(s) Source: Elections Alberta

== See also ==
- 31st Alberta Legislature
- 2025 Alberta provincial by-elections
  - 2025 Edmonton-Ellerslie provincial by-election
  - 2025 Edmonton-Strathcona provincial by-election
- 2025 Alberta municipal elections
