= 2025 Edmonton-Ellerslie provincial by-election =

By-election in Alberta, Canada

- June 23, 2025

Riding of Edmonton-Ellerslie
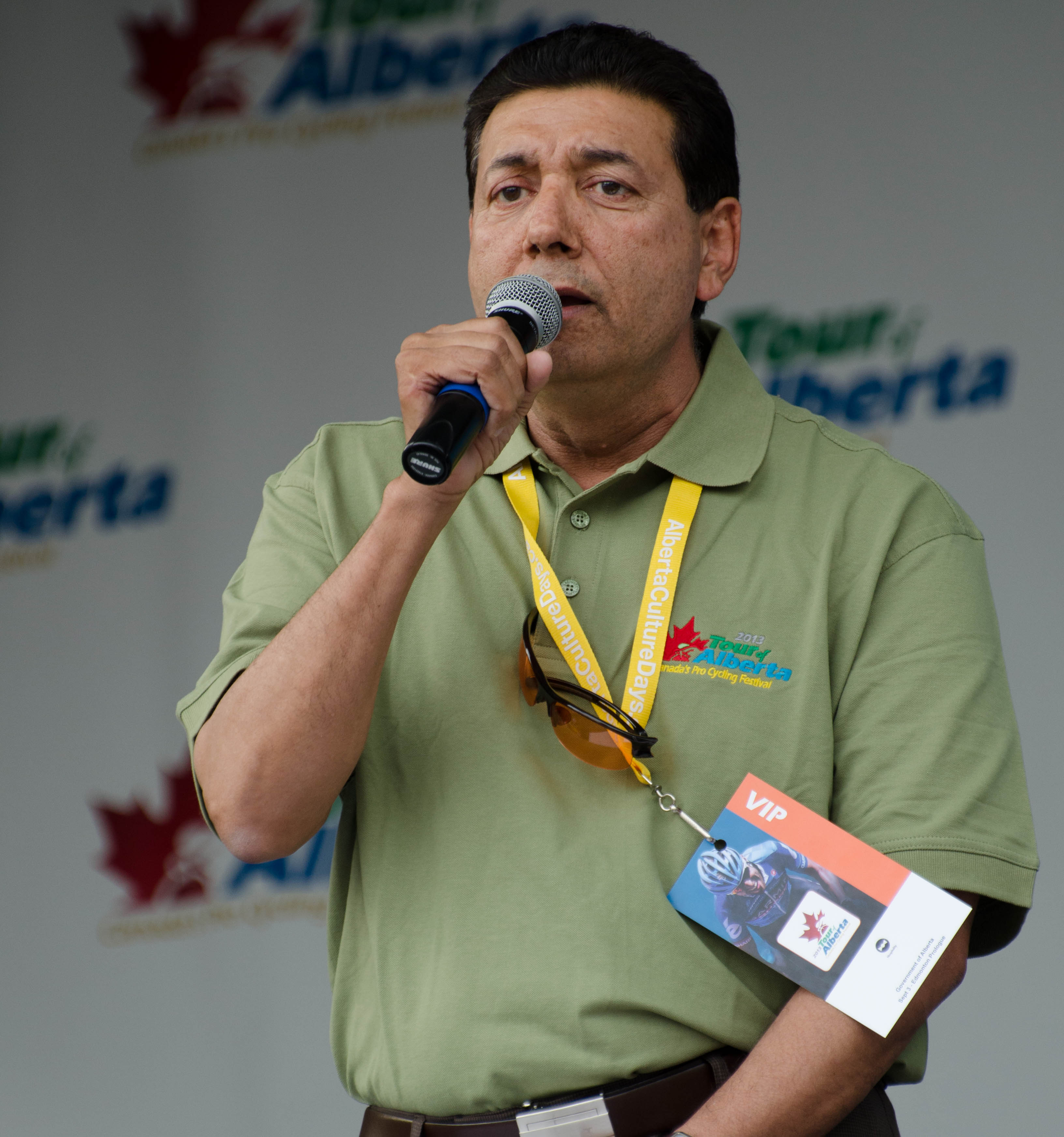
	First party	Second party
	NDP
Candidate	Gurtej Singh Brar	Naresh Bhardwaj
Party	New Democratic	United Conservative
Popular vote	4,327	3,239
Percentage	50.84%	38.06%
Swing	▼10.90%	▲1.23%
MLA before election
Rod Loyola
New Democratic
Elected MLA
Gurtej Singh Brar
New Democratic

A by-election took place on June 23, 2025 in the Albertan provincial riding of Edmonton-Ellerslie to replace Rod Loyola. It was held on the same day as by-elections in Edmonton-Strathcona and Olds-Didsbury-Three Hills.

== Candidates ==
Candidate	Party
Naresh Bhardwaj	United Conservative
Gurtej Singh Brar	New Democratic
Caroline Currie	Alberta Party
Pamela Henson	Wildrose Loyalty Coalition
Fred Munn	Republican
Manpreet Tiwana	Liberal

== Results ==
Alberta provincial by-election, June 23, 2025: Edmonton-Ellerslie Resignation of Rod Loyola
** Preliminary results — Not yet official **
Party	Candidate	Votes	%	±%
New Democratic	Gurtej Singh Brar	4,327	50.84	-10.90
United Conservative	Naresh Bhardwaj	3,239	38.06	+1.23
Liberal	Manpreet Tiwana	410	4.82	–
Republican	Fred Munn	291	3.42	–
Alberta Party	Caroline Currie	203	2.39	–
Wildrose Loyalty Coalition	Pamela Henson	41	0.48	-0.94
Total valid votes		8,511		
Total rejected ballots				
Turnout				
Eligible voters				
New Democratic hold		Swing		-6.07
Source(s) Source: Elections Alberta

== Previous result ==
2023 Alberta general election: Edmonton-Ellerslie
Party	Candidate	Votes	%	±%
New Democratic	Rod Loyola	11,429	61.75	+10.80
United Conservative	Ranjit Bath	6,817	36.83	-1.08
Wildrose Loyalty Coalition	Angela Stretch	264	1.43	–
Total		18,510	99.42	–
Rejected and declined		206	1.10	+0.25
Turnout		18,716	56.24	-9.41
Eligible voters		33,278		
New Democratic hold		Swing		+5.94
Source(s) Source: Elections Alberta

== See also ==
- 31st Alberta Legislature
- 2025 Alberta provincial by-elections
  - 2025 Edmonton-Strathcona provincial by-election
  - 2025 Olds-Didsbury-Three Hills provincial by-election
- 2025 Battle River—Crowfoot federal by-election
