= 2026 Alberta electoral redistribution =

Changes to electoral districts in Alberta, Canada

A redistribution of provincial electoral districts in Alberta began in 2025. Alberta's Electoral Boundaries Commission Act requires the appointment of an independent commission to provide a recommendation on the new electoral boundaries to the Legislative Assembly of Alberta. The commission is appointed once eight years has passed after the previous appointment of a commission. The redistribution process began in March 2025 and the Commission submitted its final report to the legislature in March 2026.

== Background ==
=== Legal principles for establishing electoral boundaries ===
In 1982, the Canadian Charter of Rights and Freedoms (Charter) entrenched political and civil rights in the Constitution of Canada. Section 3 of the Charter guarantees Canadian citizens the right to vote for a federal and provincial representative and the right to be eligible for membership in the House of Commons or of a provincial legislature, subject to reasonable limits under Section 1 of the Charter. Parliament and provincial legislatures cannot override Section 3 rights under Section 33 of the Charter (the notwithstanding clause).

The Supreme Court of Canada considered electoral boundaries under section 3 of the Charter in Reference re Provincial Electoral Boundaries (Sask) (1991). Writing for the majority, Justice Beverley McLachlin defined the section 3 guarantee as "effective representation," and rejected the American principle of "one man, one vote". Parity of voting power, meaning similar population levels across electoral districts, remains an important part of effective representation, but not determinative in Canada. Deviations from parity may be constitutional where they respond to social and physical geography, community interests, minority representation, and practical realities. The Supreme Court held that larger deviations for rural and remote districts may be justified because elected officials can face greater difficulty representing those districts, including transportation and communication barriers and greater demands from rural voters.

=== Previous Alberta electoral boundary readjustments ===
In 1990, the Alberta legislature appointed a special committee of MLAs led by Taber-Warner MLA Bob Bogle to evaluate the redistribution of electoral districts in the province. In November 1990, the special committee submitted its report to the Legislature. The government then referred the matter to the Alberta Court of Appeal to determine whether the proposed boundaries complied with the Charter. The Court held that the boundaries were consistent with the Charter and the Supreme Court of Canada's decision in Reference re Provincial Electoral Boundaries (Sask) (1991).

The Legislature did not proceed with the report. Instead, amendments were introduced to the Electoral Divisions Act in early 1991 to reduce the risk of a Charter challenge to the new districts. The Legislature approved the second version of the boundaries, which Alberta used in the June 1993 general election. The government then posed a second reference question to the Alberta Court of Appeal. The Court held that the boundaries complied with the Charter, but identified problems with the process and the redistribution requirements. In particular, members of the select committee could not provide the Court with a sufficient rationale for several proposed boundaries and district populations. The Court noted that a proper electoral boundary review was necessary within the term of the sitting Legislature, which expired in 1997. The 1995 electoral boundary commission had five members: two appointed by the government, two appointed by the opposition, and a chair who was a judge. Alberta established similar independent commissions for electoral boundary readjustments in 2003, 2010, and 2017.

=== 2024 Electoral Boundaries Commission Act changes ===
Results from the 2023 Alberta general election by electoral district.

In November 2024, United Conservative Justice Minister Mickey Amery announced changes to the Electoral Boundaries Commission Act before the government established the Commission. First, the amendments expanded the Legislative Assembly of Alberta from 87 to 89 members. Second, they changed the statutory factors that the Commission had to consider.

When developing the new electoral districts and boundaries, the Commission could consider: (a) sparsity, density, and rate of population growth; (b) communities of interest, including municipalities, regional and rural communities, Indian reserves, and Métis Settlements; (c) geographical features; (d) the availability of communication and transportation between different parts of Alberta; (e) the desirability of understandable and clear boundaries; and (f) any other factors that the Commission considered appropriate. The new factors included the rate of population growth and regional and rural communities as part of communities of interest. The amendments removed consideration of existing municipal boundaries wherever possible and existing community boundaries within Edmonton and Calgary. In December 2024, the Alberta Legislature passed the amendments to the Electoral Boundaries Commission Act.

== 2025–26 Commission activities ==
The Electoral Boundaries Commission Act requires the appointment of a five-member commission. The Lieutenant Governor in Council (Alberta Cabinet) appoints the chair. The chair may be the Ethics Commissioner, the Auditor General, the president of an Alberta post-secondary institution, a judge or retired judge of an Alberta court, or another person with similar qualifications. The government and the official opposition each appoint two members.

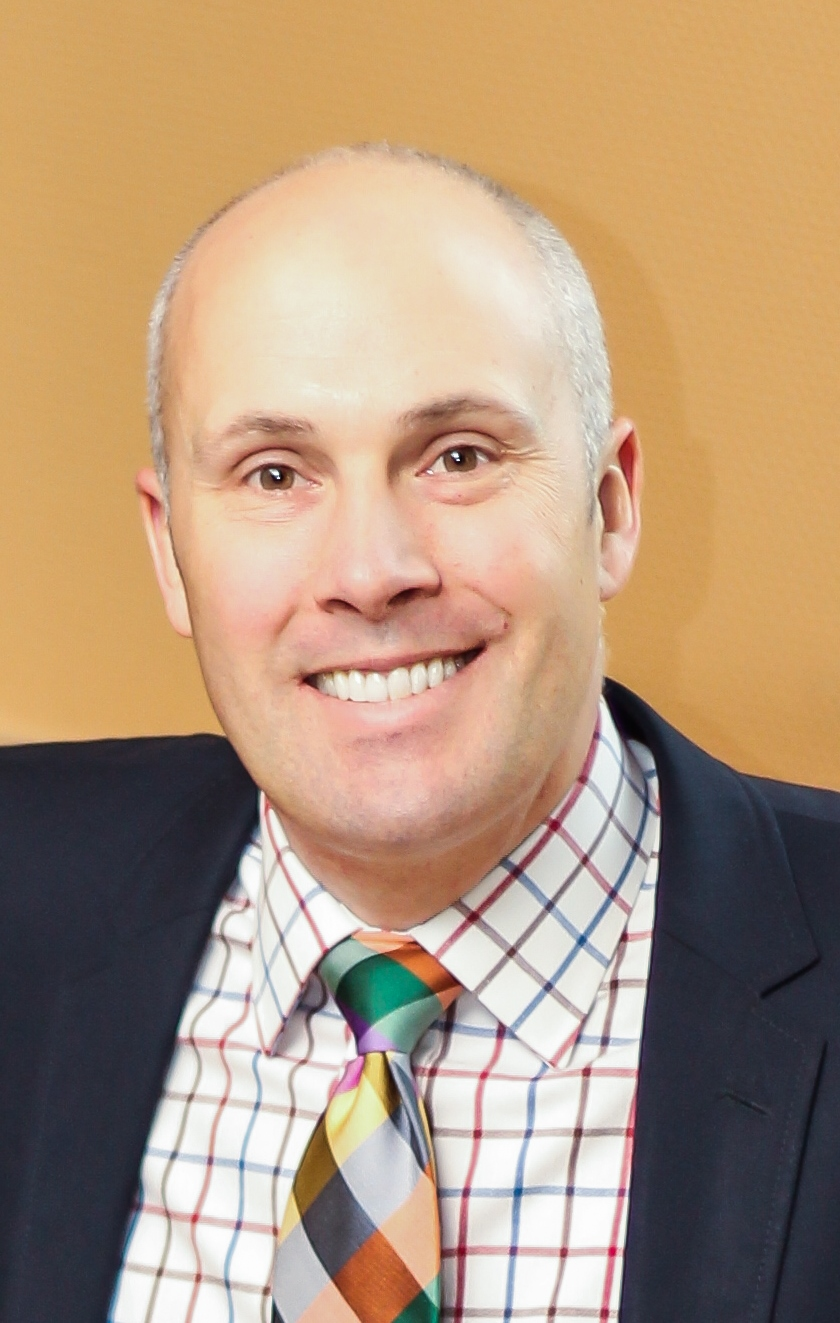
Former MLA Greg Clark was appointed one of the five commissioners.

In March 2025, Justice Dallas K. Miller of the Court of King's Bench of Alberta was appointed chair. The United Conservative government appointed Julian Martin and John D. Evans. The New Democratic opposition appointed Greg Clark and Susan Samson. From April to June 2025, the Commission held public hearings and then submitted an interim report to the Legislature in October 2025. After releasing the interim report, the Commission called for written submissions, held public meetings, and sought public input from November 2025 until early 2026. In total, the Commission received 198 written submissions and held 26 public hearings.

On March 23, 2026, the Commission submitted its final report to the Legislature. The report included a majority recommendation by Justice Miller, Greg Clark, and Susan Samson, and a minority recommendation by Julian Martin and John D. Evans. Justice Miller also included an addendum to the majority recommendation. The addendum addressed the possibility that the Legislature might reject the majority recommendation and expand from 89 to 91 members. In that event, Justice Miller identified the circumstances in which two additional rural electoral districts would be acceptable.

=== Majority recommendations ===
The Commission's majority recommended 28 electoral districts in Calgary, 21 in Edmonton, 12 in Southern Alberta, 19 in Central Alberta, and 9 in Northern Alberta. This represented an increase of two electoral districts for Calgary, one for Edmonton, and one for Southern Alberta, and a reduction of two districts for Central Alberta. The average population across the 89 electoral districts was 54,929.

In Calgary, the Commission added three new districts: Calgary-Nose Creek in the northeast, Calgary-McKenzie in the south, Calgary-Confluence in central Calgary. It collapsed Calgary-Peigan and merged its territory into neighbouring districts. It renamed Calgary-Foothills as Calgary-Symons Valley to avoid confusion with Foothills County. The Commission also established four hybrid electoral divisions that included parts of Calgary and areas outside the city limits: Calgary-East, which included Janet in Rocky View County; Calgary-Falconridge-Conrich, which included the Hamlet of Conrich in Rocky View County; Calgary-Glenmore-Tsuut'ina, which included the Tsuut'ina Nation; and Calgary-West-Elbow Valley, which included the Elbow Valley area.

In Edmonton, the Commission added two new districts: Edmonton-Beaumont and Edmonton-Enoch. To accommodate those additions, it consolidated six urban-core electoral divisions into five because those areas had lower growth rates. The affected divisions were Edmonton-City Centre, Edmonton-Highlands-Norwood, Edmonton-Gold Bar, Edmonton-Strathcona, Edmonton-Riverview, and Edmonton-Glenora. The Commission renamed Edmonton-South West as Edmonton-Windermere to avoid directional naming. It also merged two core ridings to create Edmonton-Glenora-Riverview. The Commission established two hybrid electoral divisions that included areas outside Edmonton's city limits: Edmonton-Beaumont, which included the City of Beaumont, and Edmonton-Enoch, which included the Enoch Cree Nation and parts of Parkland County.

In Southern Alberta, the Commission reconfigured the two existing electoral districts in Airdrie: Airdrie-Cochrane and Airdrie-East, into three districts: Airdrie-East, Airdrie-West, and Cochrane-Springbank. It reconfigured Cardston-Siksika into High River-Vulcan-Siksika and renamed Taber-Warner as Taber-Cardston after adding the municipality of Cardston. It renamed Highwood as Okotoks-Diamond Valley to reflect major communities in the district. Consistent with the new naming conventions, it renamed Medicine Hat-Brooks and Medicine Hat-Cypress to place the largest municipality first. The Commission established six hybrid electoral divisions in Southern Alberta, including Lethbridge-West, which incorporated new rural areas.

In Central Alberta, the Commission collapsed Rimbey-Rocky Mountain House-Sundre and Lac Ste. Anne-Parkland and merged their territory into neighbouring divisions. It renamed several ridings to reflect their primary counties or largest municipalities. The Commission granted Canmore-Banff, which had a population 27.2 per cent below the provincial average, special protection under section 15(2) of the Act because of its distance from the Legislature and high Indigenous population.

In Northern Alberta, the Commission recommended 9 electoral districts, retaining the current total after reversing an interim proposal to consolidate Lesser Slave Lake. It renamed several ridings to reflect their primary counties or largest municipalities. The region retained four northern districts: Fort McMurray-Lac La Biche, Fort McMurray-Wood Buffalo, Grande Prairie, and Grande Prairie-Wapiti. The Commission granted Lesser Slave Lake and Central Peace-Notley special status under section 15(2) of the Act, with populations 45.4 and 47.7 per cent below the provincial average, permitting population deviations exceeding 25 percent from the provincial average.

The Commission's majority stated that the minority report recommendations were procedurally unfair, substantively unreasonable, and likely unconstitutional under section 3 of the Charter. The majority described the minority's use of hybrid districts in Calgary and Edmonton as unreasonable and incoherent. It also stated that the minority recommendations did not reflect the views of Albertans who participated in the Commission's public engagement.

Majority Report Electoral Districts and Populations
Name	Region	ED #	Population	Variance
Calgary-Acadia	Calgary	1	55,791	1.6%
Calgary-Beddington	Calgary	2	56,024	2.0%
Calgary-Bhullar-McCall	Calgary	3	55,887	1.7%
Calgary-Bow	Calgary	4	54,981	0.1%
Calgary-Buffalo	Calgary	5	58,777	7.0%
Calgary-Confluence	Calgary	6	58,632	6.7%
Calgary-Cross	Calgary	7	59,491	8.3%
Calgary-Currie	Calgary	8	58,111	5.8%
Calgary-East	Calgary	9	58,308	6.2%
Calgary-Edgemont	Calgary	10	55,141	0.4%
Calgary-Elbow	Calgary	11	55,297	0.7%
Calgary-Falconridge-Conrich	Calgary	12	56,661	3.2%
Calgary-Fish Creek	Calgary	13	55,403	0.9%
Calgary-Glenmore-Tsuut’ina	Calgary	14	56,970	3.7%
Calgary-Hays	Calgary	15	52,147	-5.1%
Calgary-Klein	Calgary	16	56,292	2.5%
Calgary-Lougheed	Calgary	17	59,554	8.4%
Calgary-McKenzie	Calgary	18	62,772	14.3%
Calgary-Mountain View	Calgary	19	54,396	-1.0%
Calgary-North	Calgary	20	57,945	5.5%
Calgary-North East	Calgary	21	54,541	-0.7%
Calgary-North West	Calgary	22	52,488	-4.4%
Calgary-Nose Creek	Calgary	23	55,155	0.4%
Calgary-Shaw	Calgary	24	58,171	5.9%
Calgary-South East	Calgary	25	53,551	-2.5%
Calgary-Symons Valley	Calgary	26	54,797	-0.2%
Calgary-Varsity	Calgary	27	57,166	4.1%
Calgary-West-Elbow Valley	Calgary	28	54,167	-1.4%
Edmonton-Beaumont	Edmonton	29	55,802	1.6%
Edmonton-Beverly-Clareview	Edmonton	30	57,481	4.6%
Edmonton-Castle Downs	Edmonton	31	59,612	8.5%
Edmonton-City Centre	Edmonton	32	57,312	4.3%
Edmonton-Decore	Edmonton	33	57,959	5.5%
Edmonton-Ellerslie	Edmonton	34	59,760	8.8%
Edmonton-Enoch	Edmonton	35	56,894	3.6%
Edmonton-Glenora-Riverview	Edmonton	36	56,622	3.1%
Edmonton-Gold Bar	Edmonton	37	54,981	0.1%
Edmonton-Highlands-Norwood	Edmonton	38	51,806	-5.7%
Edmonton-Manning	Edmonton	39	56,901	3.6%
Edmonton-McClung	Edmonton	40	61,859	12.6%
Edmonton-Meadows	Edmonton	41	56,880	3.6%
Edmonton-Mill Woods	Edmonton	42	59,673	8.6%
Edmonton-North West	Edmonton	43	61,226	11.5%
Edmonton-Rutherford	Edmonton	44	58,082	5.7%
Edmonton-South	Edmonton	45	60,775	10.6%
Edmonton-Strathcona	Edmonton	46	56,165	2.3%
Edmonton-West Henday	Edmonton	47	61,775	12.5%
Edmonton-Whitemud	Edmonton	48	60,347	9.9%
Edmonton-Windermere	Edmonton	49	56,944	3.7%
Airdrie-East	Near Calgary	50	53,809	-2.0%
Airdrie-West	Near Calgary	51	48,145	-12.4%
Chestermere-Strathmore	Near Calgary	56	56,679	3.2%
Cochrane-Springbank	Near Calgary	57	56,487	2.8%
Okotoks-Diamond Valley	Near Calgary	76	55,284	0.6%
Fort Saskatchewan-Vegreville	Near Edmonton	62	54,278	-1.2%
Leduc-Devon	Near Edmonton	67	56,572	3.0%
Sherwood Park	Near Edmonton	80	52,475	-4.5%
Spruce Grove	Near Edmonton	81	55,930	1.8%
St. Albert	Near Edmonton	82	59,935	9.1%
St. Albert-Sturgeon	Near Edmonton	83	54,214	-1.3%
Strathcona-Sherwood Park	Near Edmonton	85	51,020	-7.1%
Barrhead-Westlock-Athabasca	North	52	52,249	-4.9%
Central Peace-Notley	North	55	28,715	-47.7%
Cold Lake-Bonnyville-St. Paul	North	58	55,809	1.6%
Fort McMurray-Lac La Biche	North	60	52,847	-3.8%
Fort McMurray-Wood Buffalo	North	61	49,615	-9.7%
Grande Prairie	North	63	50,352	-8.3%
Grande Prairie-Wapiti	North	64	53,781	-2.1%
Lesser Slave Lake	North	68	30,011	-45.4%
Peace River	North	77	43,399	-21.0%
Camrose	Central	53	54,653	-0.5%
Canmore-Banff	Central	54	39,961	-27.2%
Drumheller-Stettler	Central	59	50,626	-7.8%
Lacombe-Clearwater	Central	66	55,750	1.5%
Lloydminster-Wainwright	Central	72	50,139	-8.7%
Mountain View-Kneehill	Central	75	52,432	-4.5%
Red Deer-North	Central	78	53,798	-2.1%
Red Deer-South	Central	79	59,123	7.6%
Stony Plain-Drayton Valley	Central	84	55,743	1.5%
Sylvan Lake-Innisfail	Central	86	55,290	0.7%
West Yellowhead	Central	88	56,562	3.0%
Wetaskiwin-Ponoka-Maskwacis	Central	89	56,399	2.7%
High River-Vulcan-Siksika	South	65	53,351	-2.9%
Lethbridge-East	South	69	57,463	4.6%
Lethbridge-West	South	70	54,235	-1.3%
Livingstone-Macleod	South	71	50,144	-8.7%
Medicine Hat-Brooks	South	73	54,833	-0.2%
Medicine Hat-Cypress	South	74	54,210	-1.3%
Taber-Cardston	South	87	54,933	0.0%

=== Justice Miller's addendum ===
Justice Dallas K. Miller included an addendum that no other member of the Commission endorsed. Justice Miller noted his concerns about the constitutionality of the minority report and included an independent recommendation with the "express purpose of dissuading the Legislature from accepting the minority report." The addendum states that it does not detract from the majority report.

The addendum provided an alternative if the Legislature was uncomfortable with removing two rural seats. Under that alternative, the Legislature could increase its size from 89 to 91 members by creating one additional electoral district south of Edmonton and another district consisting mainly of Clearwater County and western Mountain View County. The second district would have a population more than 25 percent below the provincial average and would receive special status under section 15(2) of the Electoral Boundaries Commission Act.

=== Minority recommendations ===
The minority report, authored by John Evans and Julian Martin, recommended assigning the two new electoral divisions to Edmonton and Calgary. It incorporated several hybrid electoral districts in Edmonton and Calgary that extend beyond city limits into the surrounding areas.

In Calgary, the minority report recommended 11 hybrid electoral districts that extended beyond city limits into surrounding areas. Calgary-Airdrie consists of the community of Coventry Hills and portions of Calgary-North East west of Deerfoot Trail; it extends outside the city limits to include south Airdrie and neighbourhoods north of Stoney Trail. Calgary-Bow-Springbank extends outside the city limits to include Springbank. Calgary-Cross includes the communities of Applewood and Abbeydale; it extends outside the city limits to include Conrich and areas wrapping around the Chestermere city limits. Calgary-De Winton consists of southern communities; it extends outside the city limits to include De Winton and the rapidly developing area north of Okotoks. Calgary-Foothills-Airdrie West extends outside the city limits to include west Airdrie west of 8 Street and areas up to Highway 567. Calgary-Hays extends outside the city limits to include Ralph Klein Park and the area east of Stoney Trail. Calgary-Nolan Hill-Cochrane contains Nolan Hill and Sage Hill; it extends outside the city limits to include the Town of Cochrane. Calgary-North West-Bearspaw extends outside the city limits to include Bearspaw and the Royal Vista commercial area. Calgary-Peigan-Chestermere includes Forest Lawn, remaining portions of Dover, and Erin Woods; it extends outside the city limits to include the southern portions of Chestermere. Calgary-South East extends outside the city limits to include areas along the Bow River to Range Road 270. Calgary-West-Tsuut'ina consists of western communities and extends outside the city limits to include the Elbow Valley area and the Tsuut'ina Nation.

In Edmonton, the minority report also consolidated six urban-core districts into five. It proposed three hybrid districts that extended beyond city limits. Edmonton-Enoch-Devon extended into Parkland County and included the Enoch Cree Nation. Edmonton-Spruce Grove extended into Parkland County and included Spruce Grove, but not neighbouring Stoney Plain.

The minority report also recommended two hybrid electoral districts for each of Red Deer and Lethbridge. Those districts extended beyond city limits into surrounding areas.

Minority Report Electoral Districts and Populations
Name	Region	Population	Variance
Calgary-Acadia	Calgary	53,346	-2.9%
Calgary-Airdrie	Calgary Hybrid	58,820	7.1%
Calgary-Beddington	Calgary	61,320	11.6%
Calgary-Bow-Springbank	Calgary Hybrid	55,560	1.1%
Calgary-Buffalo	Calgary	66,801	21.6%
Calgary-Cross	Calgary Hybrid	63,064	14.8%
Calgary-Currie	Calgary	60,141	9.5%
Calgary-De Winton	Calgary Hybrid	47,732	-13.1%
Calgary-East	Calgary	57,107	4.0%
Calgary-Edgemont	Calgary	56,584	3.0%
Calgary-Elbow	Calgary	59,034	7.5%
Calgary-Falconridge	Calgary	63,986	16.5%
Calgary-Fish Creek	Calgary	57,894	5.4%
Calgary-Foothills-Airdrie West	Calgary Hybrid	58,436	6.4%
Calgary-Glenmore	Calgary	53,096	-3.3%
Calgary-Hays	Calgary Hybrid	52,395	-4.6%
Calgary-Klein	Calgary	61,817	12.5%
Calgary-Lougheed	Calgary	56,122	2.2%
Calgary-McCall-Bhullar	Calgary	66,474	21.0%
Calgary-Mountain View	Calgary	62,634	14.0%
Calgary-Nolan Hill-Cochrane	Calgary Hybrid	56,282	2.5%
Calgary-North	Calgary	56,981	3.7%
Calgary-North East	Calgary	68,145	24.1%
Calgary-North West-Bearspaw	Calgary Hybrid	57,246	4.2%
Calgary-Peigan-Chestermere	Calgary Hybrid	52,639	-4.2%
Calgary-South	Calgary	55,134	0.4%
Calgary-South East	Calgary Hybrid	54,045	-1.6%
Calgary-Varsity	Calgary	64,982	18.3%
Calgary-West-Tsuut'ina	Calgary Hybrid	57,827	5.3%
Edmonton-Beaumont	Edmonton Hybrid	55,802	1.6%
Edmonton-Beverly-Clareview	Edmonton	57,481	4.6%
Edmonton-Castledowns	Edmonton	59,612	8.5%
Edmonton-City Centre	Edmonton	57,312	4.3%
Edmonton-Decore	Edmonton	57,959	5.5%
Edmonton-Ellerslie	Edmonton	59,760	8.8%
Edmonton-Enoch-Devon	Edmonton Hybrid	55,043	0.2%
Edmonton-Glenora-Riverview	Edmonton	59,708	8.7%
Edmonton-Gold Bar	Edmonton	54,981	0.1%
Edmonton-Highlands-Norwood	Edmonton	51,806	-5.7%
Edmonton-Manning	Edmonton	56,901	3.6%
Edmonton-McClung	Edmonton	61,859	12.6%
Edmonton-Meadows	Edmonton	56,880	3.6%
Edmonton-Mill Woods	Edmonton	59,673	8.6%
Edmonton-North West	Edmonton	61,226	11.5%
Edmonton-Rutherford	Edmonton	58,082	5.7%
Edmonton-South	Edmonton	60,775	10.6%
Edmonton-Spruce Grove	Edmonton Hybrid	59,524	8.4%
Edmonton-Strathcona	Edmonton	56,165	2.3%
Edmonton-West Henday	Edmonton	62,510	13.8%
Edmonton-Whitemud	Edmonton	60,347	9.9%
Edmonton-Windermere	Edmonton	56,944	3.7%
Airdrie East	Other	50,797	-7.5%
Barrhead-Westlock-Athabasca	Other	46,892	-14.6%
Camrose	Other	48,536	-11.6%
Canmore-Kananaskis	Other	49,542	-9.8%
Cold Lake-Bonnyville-St. Paul	Other	55,713	1.4%
Central Peace-Notley	Other	30,446	-44.6%
Chestermere-Strathmore	Other	52,982	-3.5%
Drumheller-Stettler	Other	51,370	-6.5%
Fort McMurray-Lac La Biche	Other	44,719	-18.6%
Fort McMurray-Wood Buffalo	Other	46,721	-14.9%
Fort Saskatchewan-Vegreville	Other	54,274	-1.2%
Grande Prairie	Other	50,352	-8.3%
Grande Prairie-Wapiti	Other	52,041	-5.3%
Highwood	Other	54,375	-1.0%
Lac Ste. Anne-Parkland	Other	47,017	-14.4%
Leduc	Other	52,328	-4.7%
Lesser Slave Lake	Other	30,011	-45.4%
Lethbridge-Cardston	Other	51,831	-5.6%
Lethbridge-Fort MacLeod-Crowsnest Pass	Other	54,564	-0.7%
Lethbridge-Little Bow	Other	56,212	2.3%
Lethbridge-Taber-Warner	Other	60,906	10.9%
Lloydminster-Wainwright	Other	49,365	-10.1%
Medicine Hat-Brooks	Other	54,898	-0.1%
Medicine Hat-Cypress	Other	60,690	10.5%
Olds-Three Hills-Didsbury	Other	49,436	-10.0%
Peace River	Other	43,408	-21.0%
Red Deer-Blackfalds	Other	52,827	-3.8%
Red Deer-Innisfail	Other	52,961	-3.6%
Red Deer-Lacombe	Other	56,180	2.3%
Red Deer-Sylvan Lake	Other	52,454	-4.5%
Rocky Mountain House-Banff Park	Other	38,298	-30.3%
Sherwood Park	Other	55,311	0.7%
St. Albert	Other	54,589	-0.6%
St. Albert-Sturgeon	Other	52,334	-4.7%
Stony Plain-Drayton Valley	Other	48,032	-12.6%
Sherwood Park-Strathcona	Other	51,826	-5.6%
West Yellowhead	Other	49,766	-9.4%
Wetaskawin-Ponoka-Maskwacis	Other	48,775	-11.2%

== Government response ==
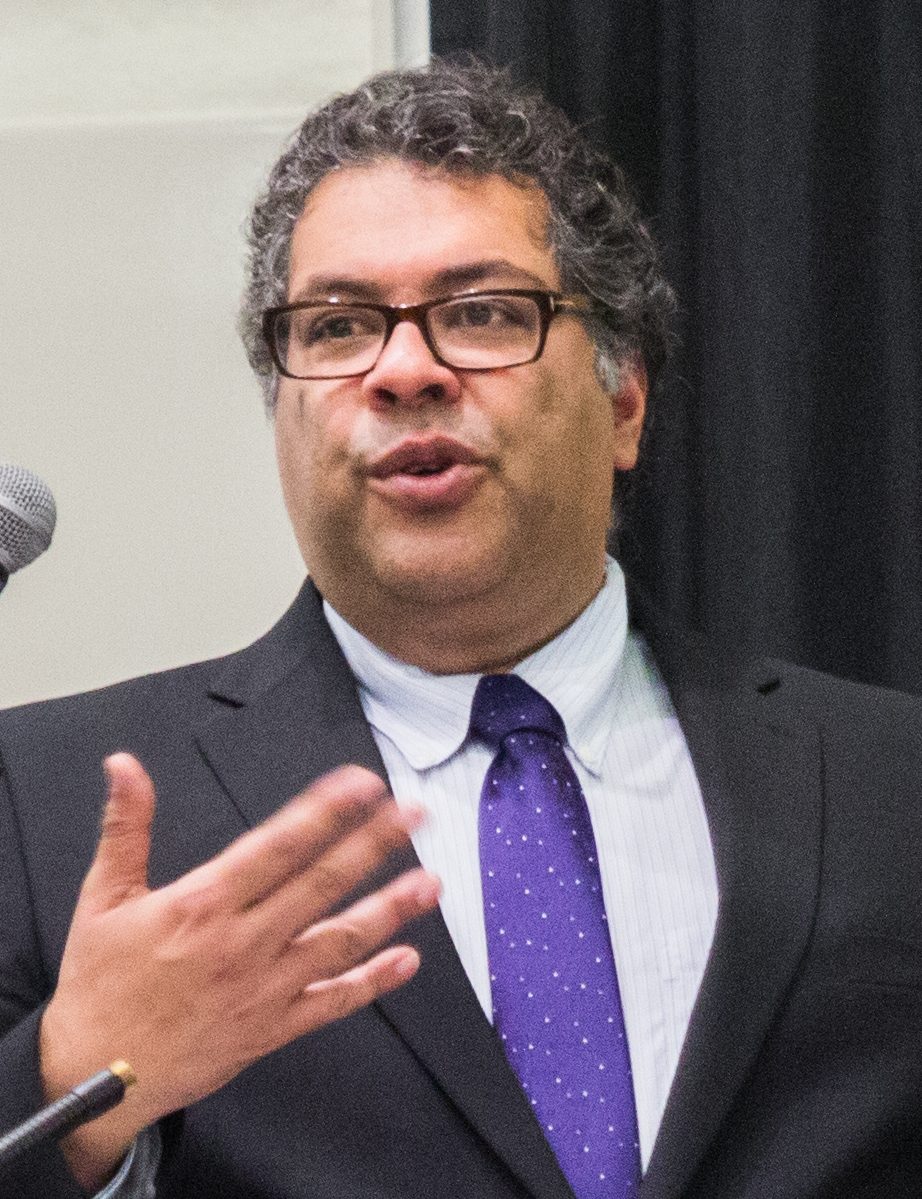
Opposition Leader Naheed Nenshi accused the United Conservative government of gerrymandering when it refused to accept the Commission's majority report.

On April 16, government house leader Joseph Schow brought forward a motion in the Legislature that rejected the majority's recommendation and established a committee with four government MLAs and two opposition members to draw a new set of electoral boundaries by October 22, 2026. Schow's motion is based on Justice Miller's addendum, with the intent of adding two seats to raise the total to 91. The MLA led process would occur without public consultation. Opposition leader Naheed Nenshi accused the government of gerrymandering.

Acting Chief Justice of Alberta Dawn Pentelechuk refused to circulate the legislature committee's request to Alberta judges seeking a new committee chair. Justice Pentelechuk's letter specifically made no judgment on the validity of the new process. The Law Society of Alberta and the Canadian Bar Association followed the Acting Chief Justice's position and refused to assist in finding retired or sitting judges to chair the committee.

On June 2, 2026, retired Provincial Court of Alberta judge Brian O'Ferrall was appointed chair of the new panel. United Conservative members selected former Member of Parliament and lobbyist Monte Solberg and Darwin Durnie as the government-appointed members. The NDP opposition selected Gerard Kennedy, a law professor at the University of Alberta, and former Okotoks municipal councillor Brent Robinson.
