= Nathan Cooper (Canadian politician) =

Canadian politician

The Honourable Nathan Cooper
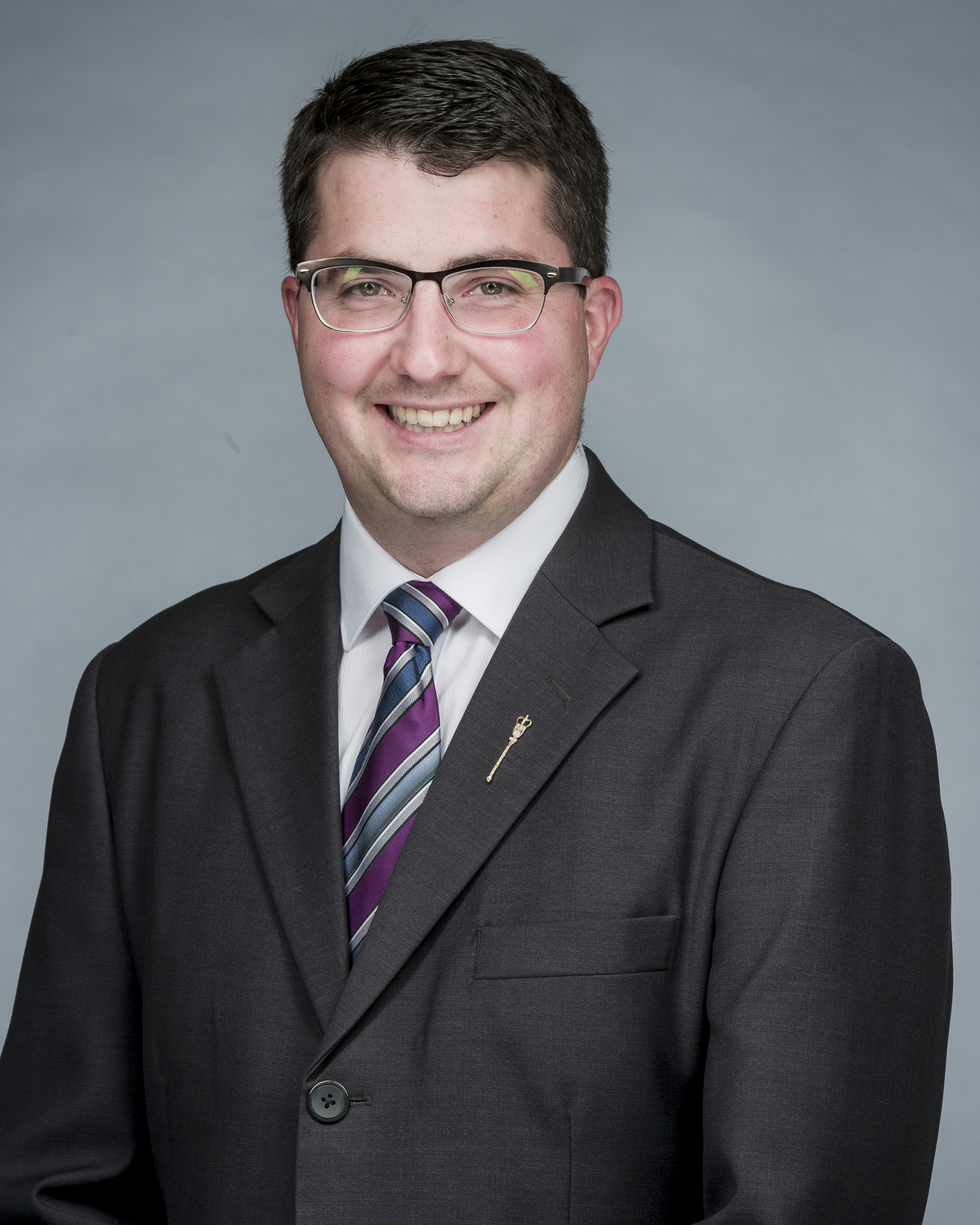
- Cooper in 2015

14th Speaker of the Legislative Assembly of Alberta
- In office May 21, 2019 – May 13, 2025
- Deputy: Angela Pitt
- Preceded by: Bob Wanner
- Succeeded by: Ric McIver

Leader of the Opposition in Alberta
- In office July 24, 2017 – October 30, 2017
- Deputy: Mike Ellis
- Preceded by: Brian Jean
- Succeeded by: Jason Nixon

Interim leader of the United Conservative Party
- In office July 24, 2017 – October 30, 2017
- Deputy: Mike Ellis
- Preceded by: Brian Jean (Wildrose leader); Jason Kenney (PC leader)
- Succeeded by: Jason Kenney

Member of the Legislative Assembly of Alberta for Olds-Didsbury-Three Hills
- In office May 5, 2015 – May 22, 2025
- Preceded by: Bruce Rowe
- Succeeded by: Tara Sawyer

Personal details
- Born: Nathan Matthew Cooper; April 18, 1980 (age 46) York, Ontario, Canada
- Party: United Conservative
- Other political affiliations: Wildrose (until 2017)
- Children: 3

Nathan Matthew Cooper MLA (born April 18, 1980) is a Canadian politician who was elected in the 2015, 2019, and 2023 Alberta general elections to represent the electoral district of Olds-Didsbury-Three Hills in the 29th, 30th, and 31st Alberta Legislatures. Cooper was a municipal councillor in Carstairs, Alberta prior to being elected to the Legislative Assembly. Cooper also served as Chief of Staff to the Wildrose Official Opposition caucus.

On July 24, 2017, Cooper was elected interim leader of the new United Conservative Party caucus, becoming the Leader of the Opposition in that process. On that same date, he and his interim leadership team nominally assumed the leaderships of the two parties that merged to form the UCP, the Progressive Conservatives and Wildrose. At the time, Alberta electoral law did not allow parties to formally merge. On 28 October 2017, Cooper's tenure as interim leader ended when former PC leader Jason Kenney was elected as the UCP's first full-time leader.

Cooper was first elected to serve as the Speaker of the Legislative Assembly of Alberta on May 21, 2019. He was reelected Speaker on June 20, 2023.

On May 7, 2025 Cooper announced he would resign as MLA and Speaker of the House and move to a new job as Alberta's representative in Washington beginning in June 2025.

He officially resigned his role as Speaker on May 13, 2025 and MLA on May 22. The by-election to replace him is scheduled for June 23, 2025.

== Speaker of the House ==
Cooper was elected Speaker of the House in the Alberta Legislature on May 21, 2019 and reelected to a second term on June 20, 2023.

He was nominated for reelection by Minister Nate Horner. Horner noted that Cooper that was "an absolute parliamentary and political nerd," and had done "a remarkable job" as Speaker of the 30th Legislature.

=== COVID-19 letter controversy ===
In 2021, Cooper signed a letter opposing restrictions amid the COVID-19 pandemic.

Cooper was widely criticized for violating the Speaker's role of impartiality and impeding his ability to moderate debate. Former Speaker David Carter has suggested that Cooper should resign or be removed by a motion of non-confidence.

He later apologized for violating the Speaker's traditional role of impartiality. Former Speaker Robert Wanner stated that while he believed the apology was sincere, it did not go far enough to restore faith in his impartiality.

== Electoral history ==
=== 2023 general election ===
2023 Alberta general election: Olds-Didsbury-Three Hills
Party	Candidate	Votes	%	±%
United Conservative	Nathan Cooper	18,228	75.29	-3.26
New Democratic	Cheryl Hunter Loewen	4,553	18.81	+7.05
Alberta Independence	Katherine Kowalchuk	1,140	4.71	–
Wildrose Loyalty Coalition	Cam Tatlock	183	0.76	–
Solidarity Movement	Judy Bridges	105	0.43	–
Total		24,209	98.82	–
Rejected and declined		288	1.18	+0.72
Turnout		24,497	64.17	
Eligible voters		38,173		
United Conservative hold		Swing		-5.16
Source(s) Source: Elections Alberta

=== 2019 general election ===
2019 Alberta general election: Olds-Didsbury-Three Hills
Party	Candidate	Votes	%	±%
United Conservative	Nathan Cooper	20,516	78.55	-0.95
New Democratic	Kyle Johnston	3,070	11.75	-4.88
Alberta Party	Chase Brown	1,779	6.81	+3.44
Freedom Conservative	Allen MacLennan	557	2.13	–
Alberta Advantage Party	Dave Hughes	195	0.75	–
Total		26,117	99.54	–
Rejected, spoiled and declined		120	0.46	–
Turnout		26,237	72.13	
Eligible voters		36,375		
United Conservative notional hold		Swing		+1.97
Source(s) Source: "76 - Olds-Didsbury-Three Hills, 2019 Alberta general election". officialresults.elections.ab.ca. Elections Alberta.

=== 2015 general election ===
2015 Alberta general election
Party	Candidate	Votes	%
Wildrose	Nathan Cooper	10,692	53.4%
Progressive Conservative	Wade Bearchell	5,274	26.3%
New Democratic	Glenn Norman	3,366	16.8%
Alberta Party	Jim Adamchick	685	3.4%
Total valid votes		20,017	
