= Olds-Didsbury-Three Hills =

Provincial electoral district in Alberta, Canada

Coordinates: 51.749°N 113.765°W

Alberta electoral district
- Olds-Didsbury-Three Hills within Alberta, 2017 boundaries

Provincial electoral district
- Legislature: Legislative Assembly of Alberta
MLA
Tara Sawyer
United Conservative
- District created: 1996
- First contested: 1997
- Last contested: 2023

Demographics
- Census division(s): Division No. 5, Division No. 6
- Census subdivision(s): Acme, Beiseker, Carbon, Carstairs, Cremona, Crossfield, Didsbury, Hussar, Irricana, Kneehill County, Linden, Mountain View County, Olds, Rockyford, Rocky View County, Standard, Three Hills, Trochu, Wheatland County

Olds-Didsbury-Three Hills is a provincial electoral district in Alberta, Canada. The district is one of 87 districts mandated to return a single member (MLA) to the Legislative Assembly of Alberta using the first past the post method of voting.

This riding in south-central Alberta stretches from the Red Deer River in the east to the area around Cremona in the west. Agriculture is the major employer, with retail a distant second. Household incomes, at $53,174, are below the Alberta average. Seven per cent of residents are considered low income. More than two-thirds of the people here were born in Alberta, while seven per cent are immigrants. People of German origin make up nine per cent of the population. More than 96 per cent say their language at home is English, the second-highest rate in Alberta (2001 census). In 2021, National Post columnist Colby Cosh wrote that the district "might be the single most truculently conservative anywhere" in Canada.

== History ==
The electoral district was created in the 1996 electoral boundary re-distribution from the old electoral districts of Olds-Didsbury and Three Hills-Airdrie.

In the 2004 electoral boundary re-distribution the boundaries changed somewhat, with an agricultural section in the far west transferred to Banff-Cochrane, while in the southeast a section of the old Drumheller-Chinook riding — including the community of Carbon — was added. Major communities include Olds, Didsbury, Carstairs, Trochu, and Three Hills, as well as Olds College. It covers Kneehill County and most of Mountain View County.

The 2010 electoral boundary re-distribution saw the district absorb the northern portions of Airdrie-Chestermere and Foothills-Rocky View which were both abolished and it lost some land on the eastern boundary to Drumheller-Stettler.

The 2017 electoral boundary re-distribution resulted in the expansion of the Olds-Didsbury-Three Hills electoral district to include the northern portion of Wheatland County, formerly part of the Strathmore-Brooks constituency. The resulting population of the district in 2017 was 49,418, 6% above the provincial average population of 46,803.

=== Boundary history ===
69 Olds-Didsbury-Three Hills 2003 boundaries
Bordering districts
North	East	West	South
Innisfail-Sylvan Lake	Drumheller-Stettler	Banff-Cochrane, Rocky Mountain House	Airdrie-Chestermere, Foothills-Rocky View, Strathmore-Brooks
riding map goes here			
Legal description from the Statutes of Alberta 2003, Electoral Divisions Act.
Starting at the east boundary of Rge. 4 W5 with the north boundary of Sec. 7 in Twp. 34, Rge. 3 W5; then 1. east along the north boundary of Secs. 7, 8, 9, 10, 11 and 12 in the Twp. and Secs. 7, 8, 9 and 10 in Twp. 34, Rge. 2 W5 to the east boundary of Sec. 10; 2. south along the east boundary of Sec. 10 to the north boundary of Sec. 2; 3. east along the north boundary of Sec. 2 to the east boundary of Sec. 2; 4. south along the east boundary of Sec. 2 to the north boundary of Twp. 33; 5. east along the north boundary of Twp. 33 to the east boundary of Rge. 28 W4; 6. north along the east boundary of Rge. 28 W4 to the north boundary of Sec. 6 in Twp. 34, Rge. 27 W4; 7. east along the north boundary of Secs. 6, 5, 4, 3, 2 and 1 in Rge. 27 W4 and the north boundary of Secs. 6 and 5 in Rge. 26 W4 to the east boundary of Sec. 8; 8. north along the east boundary of Secs. 8, 17, 20 and 29 to the north boundary of Sec. 28 in the Twp.; 9. east along the north boundary of Secs. 28, 27, 26 and 25 in the Twp. and the north boundary of Secs. 30, 29 and 28 in Twp. 34, Rge. 25 W4 to the east boundary of Sec. 33 in the Twp.; 10. north along the east boundary to the north boundary of Twp. 34; 11. west along the north boundary to the east boundary of Sec. 3 in Twp. 35, Rge. 25 W4; 12. north along the east boundary to the north boundary of Sec. 2 in the Twp.; 13. east along the north boundary of Secs. 2 and 1 in the Twp. and the north boundary of Secs. 6, 5, 4, 3, 2 and 1 in Twp. 35, Rge. 24 W4 to the east boundary of Rge. 24 W4; 14. south along the east boundary to the north boundary of Twp. 34; 15. east along the north boundary to the right bank of the Red Deer River; 16. downstream along the right bank to the west boundary of the Town of Drumheller; 17. in a generally southeasterly direction along the west boundary of the Town of Drumheller to the north boundary of Sec. 1, Twp. 28, Rge. 20 W4; 18. west along the north boundary of Sec. 1 to the east boundary of the west half of Sec. 1; 19. south along the east boundary of the west half of Sec. 1 to the intersection with the Canadian National Railway (CNR) right-of-way; 20. in a southwesterly direction along the CNR right-of-way to the east boundary of Sec. 21, Twp. 27, Rge. 21 W4; 21. north along the east boundary of Secs. 21, 28 and 33 in the Twp. and the east boundary of Secs. 4 and 9 in Twp. 28 to the north boundary of Sec. 9 in Twp. 28, Rge. 21 W4; 22. west along the north boundary of Secs. 9, 8 and 7 in the Twp. and Secs. 12, 11, 10, 9, 8 and 7 in Twp. 27, Rges. 22, 23 and 24 to the east boundary of Rge. 25 W4; 23. north along the east boundary to the north boundary of Twp. 28; 24. west along the north boundary to the east boundary of Rge. 28 W4; 25. north along the east boundary to the north boundary of Sec. 1 in Twp. 29, Rge. 28 W4; 26. west along the north boundary of Secs. 1, 2, 3 and 4 to the east boundary of Sec. 8 in the Twp.; 27. north along the east boundary of Secs. 8 and 17 to the north boundary of Sec. 17 in the Twp.; 28. west along the north boundary of Secs. 17 and 18 in the Twp. and the north boundary of Secs. 13, 14 and 15 in Twp. 29, Rge. 29 W4 and the north boundary of Secs. 13, 14 and 15 in Twp. 29, Rge. 1 W5 to the east boundary of Sec. 16 in the Twp.; 29. south along the east boundary to the north boundary of Sec. 9 in the Twp.; 30. west along the north boundary of Secs. 9, 8 and 7 in the Twp. and the north boundary of Secs. 12 and 11 in Twp. 29, Rge. 2 W5 to the east boundary of Sec. 10 in the Twp.; 31. south along the east boundary of Secs. 10 and 3 in the Twp. to the north boundary of Twp. 28; 32. west along the north boundary to the east boundary of Rge. 6 W5; 33. north along the east boundary to the north boundary of Sec. 13 in Twp. 29, Rge. 6 W5; 34. west along the north boundary to the east boundary of the west half of Sec. 24 in the Twp.; 35. north along the east boundary of the west half of Sec. 24 to the north boundary of the south half of Sec. 24; 36. west along the north boundary of the south half of Sec. 24 to the east boundary of Sec. 23 in the Twp.; 37. north along the east boundary of Sec. 23 to the north boundary of Sec. 23; 38. west along the north boundary to the east boundary of Sec. 27; 39. north along the east boundary of Secs. 27 and 34 to the north boundary of Twp. 29, Rge. 6 W5; 40. east along the north boundary of the Twp. to the east boundary of Rge. 6 W5; 41. north along the east boundary of Rge. 6 to the north boundary of Twp. 30, Rge. 6 W5; 42. east along the north boundary of Twp. 30 to the intersection with Highway 22; 43. north along Highway 22 to the intersection with Highway 27; 44. east along Highway 27 to the east boundary of Rge. 4 W5; 45. north along the east boundary to the starting point.
Note:

73 Olds-Didsbury-Three Hills 2010 boundaries
Bordering districts
North	East	West	South
Innisfail-Sylvan Lake	Drumheller-Stettler	Banff-Cochrane and Rimbey-Rocky Mountain House-Sundre	Airdrie, Chestermere-Rocky View and Strathmore-Brooks
Note: Boundary descriptions were not used in the 2010 redistribution

=== Representation history ===
Members of the Legislative Assembly for Olds-Didsbury-Three Hills
Assembly	Years	Member	Party
See Olds-Didsbury 1979-1997 and Three Hills-Airdrie 1993-1997
24th	1997-2001	Richard Marz	Progressive Conservative
25th	2001-2004	Richard Marz	Progressive Conservative
26th	2004-2008	Richard Marz	Progressive Conservative
27th	2008-2012	Richard Marz	Progressive Conservative
27th	2012	Vacant	
28th	2012–2014	Bruce Rowe	Wildrose
28th	2014–2015	Bruce Rowe	Progressive Conservative
29th	2015–2017	Nathan Cooper	Wildrose
29th	2017–2019	Nathan Cooper	United Conservative
30th	2019–2023	Nathan Cooper	United Conservative
31st	2023–2025	Nathan Cooper	United Conservative
31st	2025	Vacant	
31st	2025–Present	Tara Sawyer	United Conservative

Right-leaning parties have fared well in this riding. Richard Marz was its first member, holding the seat until 2012. In his first election win in 1997, the runner-up was Social Credit candidate Don MacDonald who had previously served as an MLA under the Liberal banner in the Legislative Assembly from 1992 to 1993.

Marz achieved a landslide running for his second term in the 2001 election taking over 80% of the popular vote. The 2004 election saw the Alliance Party in a distant second with 16.5%. The 2008 election resulted with Marz increasing his votes by 4.66% over the 2004 results. The Alliance Party changed names to the Wildrose Alliance Party and remained well behind with only 21.03% of the vote. Marz vacated the seat ahead of the 2012 general election on March 16, 2012. Wildrose candidate Bruce Rowe was elected in the 2012 provincial election.

== Legislative election results ==
=== 2025 by-election ===
Alberta provincial by-election, June 23, 2025 Resignation of Nathan Cooper
** Preliminary results — Not yet official **
Party	Candidate	Votes	%	±%
United Conservative	Tara Sawyer	9,363	61.12	-14.17
New Democratic	Beverley Toews	3,061	19.98	+1.18
Republican	Cameron Davies	2,705	17.66	–
Wildrose Loyalty Coalition	Bill Tufts	189	1.23	+0.48
Total valid votes		15,318		
Total rejected ballots				
Turnout				
Eligible voters				
United Conservative hold		Swing		-7.67
Source(s) Source: Elections Alberta

=== 2023 ===
2023 Alberta general election
Party	Candidate	Votes	%	±%
United Conservative	Nathan Cooper	18,228	75.29	-3.26
New Democratic	Cheryl Hunter Loewen	4,553	18.81	+7.05
Alberta Independence	Katherine Kowalchuk	1,140	4.71	–
Wildrose Loyalty Coalition	Cam Tatlock	183	0.76	–
Solidarity Movement	Judy Bridges	105	0.43	–
Total		24,209	98.82	–
Rejected and declined		288	1.18	+0.72
Turnout		24,497	64.17	
Eligible voters		38,173		
United Conservative hold		Swing		-5.16
Source(s) Source: Elections Alberta

=== 2019 ===
2019 Alberta general election
Party	Candidate	Votes	%	±%
United Conservative	Nathan Cooper	20,516	78.55	-0.95
New Democratic	Kyle Johnston	3,070	11.75	-4.88
Alberta Party	Chase Brown	1,779	6.81	+3.44
Freedom Conservative	Allen MacLennan	557	2.13	–
Alberta Advantage Party	Dave Hughes	195	0.75	–
Total		26,117	99.54	–
Rejected, spoiled and declined		120	0.46	–
Turnout		26,237	72.13	
Eligible voters		36,375		
United Conservative notional hold		Swing		+1.97
Source(s) Source: "76 - Olds-Didsbury-Three Hills, 2019 Alberta general election". officialresults.elections.ab.ca. Elections Alberta.

=== 2015 ===
Redistributed results, 2015 Alberta election
Party	Votes	%
Wildrose	11,200	52.83
Progressive Conservative	5,654	26.67
New Democratic	3,527	16.64
Alberta Party	714	3.37
Green	73	0.34
Liberal	9	0.04
Other	22	0.10

2015 Alberta general election
Party	Candidate	Votes	%	±%
Wildrose	Nathan Cooper	10,692	53.41	-3.12
Progressive Conservative	Wade Bearchell	5,274	26.35	-10.89
New Democratic	Glenn R Norman	3,366	16.82	+13.68
Alberta Party	Jim Adamchick	685	3.42	–
Total		20,017	99.46	–
Rejected, spoiled and declined		109	0.54	-0.04
Turnout		20,126	59.44	-1.67
Eligible voters		33,859		
Wildrose hold		Swing		+3.89
Source(s) Source: "73 - Olds-Didsbury-Three Hills, 2015 Alberta general election". officialresults.elections.ab.ca. Elections Alberta.

=== 2012 ===
2012 Alberta general election
Party	Candidate	Votes	%	±%
Wildrose	Bruce Rowe	10,182	56.54	+35.51
Progressive Conservative	Darcy Davis	6,707	37.24	-26.82
New Democratic	Kristie Krezanoski	565	3.14	+0.95
Liberal	Garth E. Davis	555	3.08	-5.40
Total		18,009	99.41	–
Rejected, spoiled, and declined		106	0.59	+0.11
Turnout		18,115	61.11	+13.91
Eligible voters		29,643		
Wildrose gain from Progressive Conservative		Swing		+31.17
Source(s) Source: "73 - Olds-Didsbury-Three Hills, 2012 Alberta general election". officialresults.elections.ab.ca. Elections Alberta.

=== 2008 ===
2008 Alberta general election
Party	Candidate	Votes	%	±%
Progressive Conservative	Richard Marz	7,837	64.06	+4.67
Wildrose	Curt Engel	2,572	21.03	+4.51
Liberal	Tony Vonesch	1,038	8.49	-2.42
Green	Kate Haddow	518	4.23	+0.41
New Democratic	Andy Davies	268	2.19	+0.09
Total		12,233	99.52	–
Rejected, spoiled and declined		59	0.48	-0.09
Turnout		12,292	47.20	-9.53
Eligible voters		26,040		
Progressive Conservative hold		Swing		+0.08
Source(s) Source: "Olds-Didsbury-Three Hills Official Results 2008 Alberta general election". Elections Alberta.

=== 2004 ===
2004 Alberta general election
Party	Candidate	Votes	%	±%
Progressive Conservative	Richard Marz	7,277	59.40	-21.41
Alberta Alliance	Gordon Quantz	2,023	16.51	–
Liberal	Tony Vonesch	1,336	10.91	-1.83
Separation	Brian Vasseur	746	6.09	–
Green	Sarah Henckel-Sutmoller	469	3.83	–
New Democratic	Christopher Davies	257	2.10	-0.84
Social Credit	Myrna Kissick	143	1.17	-2.36
Total		12,251	99.43	–
Rejected, spoiled and declined		70	0.57	+0.16
Turnout		12,321	56.73	-4.57
Eligible voters		21,718		
Progressive Conservative hold		Swing		-18.96
Source(s) Source: "Olds-Didsbury-Three Hills Statement of Official Results 2004 Alberta general election" (PDF). Elections Alberta.

=== 2001 ===
2001 Alberta general election
Party	Candidate	Votes	%	±%
Progressive Conservative	Richard Marz	10,553	80.81	+23.73
Liberal	Gayleen Roelfsema	1,663	12.73	-0.08
Social Credit	Nicholas Semmler	460	3.52	-24.55
New Democratic	Brenda L. Dyck	383	2.93	+0.91
Total		13,059	99.59	–
Rejected, spoiled and declined		54	0.41	+0.04
Turnout		13,113	61.30	-0.39
Eligible voters		21,391		
Progressive Conservative hold		Swing		+11.90
Source(s) Source: "Olds-Didsbury-Three Hills Official Results 2001 Alberta general election". Alberta Heritage Community Foundation. "Electoral Division of Olds-Didsbury-Three Hills Statement of Official Results". Elections Alberta.

=== 1997 ===
1997 Alberta general election
Party	Candidate	Votes	%
Progressive Conservative	Richard Marz	6,958	57.08
Social Credit	Don MacDonald	3,422	28.07
Liberal	Dave Herbert	1,562	12.81
New Democratic	Anne Wilson	247	2.03
Total		12,189	99.63
Rejected, spoiled and declined		45	0.37
Turnout		12,234	61.69
Eligible voters		19,830	
Progressive Conservative pickup new district.			
Source(s) Source: "Olds-Didsbury-Three Hills Official Results 1997 Alberta general election". Elections Alberta.

== Referendum results ==
2026 Alberta referendum
Side	Votes	%
Remain	15,215	55.29
Referendum	12,302	44.71

== Senate nominee election results ==
=== 2004 ===
2004 Senate nominee election results: Olds-Didsbury-Three Hills				Turnout 56.98%	
Affiliation	Candidate	Votes	% votes	% ballots	Rank
Progressive Conservative	Bert Brown	6,517	19.24%	59.43%	1
Progressive Conservative	Betty Unger	4,721	13.94%	43.05%	2
Progressive Conservative	Jim Silye	3,687	10.89%	33.62%	5
Independent	Link Byfield	3,483	10.28%	31.76%	4
Progressive Conservative	Cliff Breitkreuz	3,439	10.15%	31.36%	3
Progressive Conservative	David Usherwood	2,969	8.77%	27.08%	6
Alberta Alliance	Vance Gough	2,816	8.31%	25.68%	8
Alberta Alliance	Michael Roth	2,500	7.38%	22.80%	7
Alberta Alliance	Gary Horan	2,263	6.68%	20.64%	10
Independent	Tom Sindlinger	1,478	4.36%	13.48%	9
Total votes		33,873	100%		
Total ballots		10,966	3.09 votes per ballot		
Rejected, spoiled and declined		1,409			

Voters had the option of selecting four candidates on the ballot

== Student vote results ==
=== 2004 ===
Participating schools
Acme School
Carbon School
Didsbury High School
Dr. Elliott School
Prairie Christian Academy
Three Hills School
Trochu Valley School
Westglen School

On November 19, 2004, a student vote was conducted at participating Alberta schools to parallel the 2004 Alberta general election results. The vote was designed to educate students and simulate the electoral process for persons who have not yet reached the legal majority. The vote was conducted in 80 of the 83 provincial electoral districts with students voting for actual election candidates. Schools with a large student body that reside in another electoral district had the option to vote for candidates outside of the electoral district then where they were physically located.

2004 Alberta student vote results
Affiliation	Candidate	Votes	%
Progressive Conservative	Richard Marz	449	42.20%
Green	Sarah Henckel-Sutmoller	170	15.98%
Alberta Alliance	Gordon Quantz	154	14.47%
Liberal	Tony Vonesch	120	11.28%
Separation	Brian Vasseur	109	10.24%
NDP	Christopher Davies	41	3.85%
Social Credit	Myrna Kissick	21	1.98%
Total		1,064	100%
Rejected, spoiled and declined		19	

=== 2012 ===
2012 Alberta Student Vote results
Affiliation	Candidate	Votes	%
Progressive Conservative	Darcy Davis		%
Wildrose	Bruce Rowe		
Alberta Party			%
NDP	Kristie Krezanoski		%
Total			100%

== See also ==
- List of Alberta provincial electoral districts
- Canadian provincial electoral districts
