= Wildrose Loyalty Coalition =

Provincial political party in Canada

- Active provincial party
- Abbreviation: WLC
- Leader: Paul Hinman
- President: Danny Hozack
- Founded: 1 May 2023
- Split from: Wildrose Independence Party of Alberta
- Headquarters: Site 1, Box 3 Streamstown, AB T0B 4G0
- Ideology: Economic liberalism
- Political position: Right-wing
- Colours: Pink; Blue; Green
- Slogan: "Standing up for Alberta"
- Seats in Legislature: 0 / 87

Website
- wildroseloyaltycoalition.com

The Wildrose Loyalty Coalition is a provincial political party in Alberta, Canada, which was formed as a split from the Wildrose Independence Party of Alberta.

== History ==
The Wildrose Loyalty Coalition was formed in March 2023 following an internal party dispute that led to the removal of Paul Hinman as leader of the Wildrose Independence Party. Hinman, the founder of the WIP, was ousted as leader in 2022. After briefly regaining control of the party, the takeover was subsequently overturned by the court. The WLC officially became a registered political party with Elections Alberta on May 1, 2023.

== Election results ==
Election	Leader	Candidates	Votes	%	Seats	+/-	Place	Position
2023	Paul Hinman	16 / 87	4,220	0.24%	0 / 87	0	8th	No Seats

=== By-elections ===
By-election	Date	Candidate	Votes	%	Place
Edmonton-Strathcona	June 23, 2025	Jesse Stretch	24	0.25	6/6
Edmonton-Ellerslie	June 23, 2025	Pamela Henson	41	0.48	6/6
Olds-Didsbury-Three Hills	June 23, 2025	Bill Tufts	189	1.23	4/4
