= Republican Party of Alberta =

Provincial political party in Canada

- Abbreviation: RPA
- Leader: Vacant
- President: Leah Wood
- Registered: January 20, 2022 (as Buffalo Party of Alberta)
- Preceded by: Buffalo Party of Alberta
- Headquarters: PO Box 6361 Drayton Valley, AB T7A 1R8
- Membership (2026): ▲ ~35,000
- Ideology: Alberta separatism; Pro-Americanism
- Political position: Right-wing
- Colours: Red
- Slogan: Faith, Family, Freedom
- Seats in Legislature: 0 / 87

Website
- albertarepublicans.com

The Republican Party of Alberta is a provincial political party in Alberta, Canada. It was founded in 2022 as the Buffalo Party of Alberta and adopted its current name in 2025. The party supports a binding referendum on Alberta independence and a subsequent non-binding referendum on joining the United States.

== History ==
=== The Buffalo Party of Alberta ===
The Buffalo Party of Alberta was registered as a political party with Elections Alberta on January 20, 2022. The first leader of the party was John Molberg. The party held a launch event in Calgary on May 12, 2022. The party ran one candidate, Andrew Jacobson, in the 2023 Alberta provincial election in the district Edmonton-Strathcona, in which they received 106 votes (0.60%). In March 2024, Andrew Jacobson was listed by Elections Alberta as the new interim leader of the party.

=== Republican Party of Alberta ===
The party changed its name to the Republican Party of Alberta on February 10, 2025. Cameron Davies, a dual Canadian-American citizen, was subsequently acclaimed as the party's new leader on April 11, 2025. The party made the announcement of his leadership on April 29. In May 2025, the Republican Party and the Independence Party of Alberta signed a memorandum of understanding, which sought to advance and unify the independence movement in Alberta. The parties worked together to select candidates who ran under the Republican banner in the 2025 Alberta provincial by-elections.

On May 14, 2025, the party announced its first candidate since their rebranding: Fred Munn would run in the Edmonton-Ellerslie by-election. On May 20, leader Cameron Davies was announced as the candidate for the Olds-Didsbury-Three Hills by-election. On May 27, Ravina Chand was named the candidate in the Edmonton-Strathcona by-election. During the campaign, former MLA for Olds-Didsbury, Gordon Kesler endorsed the Republican Party and Cameron Davies. He is known for being elected in 1982, in a by-election under the separatist Western Canada Concept party. The party did not win any of the elections, which were held on June 23, 2025.

On April 30, 2026, the Republican Party of Alberta along with the Centurion Project were implicated in a large privacy breach for distributing the private information of millions of Albertans. Originally, the list was given legally to the Republican Party of Alberta but ended up being hosted by the Centurion Project on a public facing website. Elections Alberta went to court and was granted an injunction that database be taken down. The Alberta RCMP has launched an investigation and is collaborating with other law enforcement partners in the province to determine if any other laws were broken.

On October 30, 2026, Cameron Davies resigned as leader of the party.

== Ideology ==
As the Buffalo Party, the party did not call for Alberta independence but rather more autonomy from the federal government. After becoming the Republican Party, it shifted towards a separatist stance, describing itself as being "at the forefront advocating for Alberta independence". It proposes holding a binding referendum on Alberta independence and a subsequent non-binding referendum on Alberta joining the United States as a state or territory.

Aside from the independence movement, the Republican Party also supports firearm ownership and abolishing the restrictive federal regulations. It supports stricter immigration laws and the restriction of temporary foreign worker permits. The party supports freedom of speech and the free market. The party advocates a melting pot society after leaving Canada.

== Membership ==
The Republicans announced that 48 hours after the 2025 Canadian federal election, the party grew by 11,394 members. In mid-May 2025, the party said it had given out 20,000 free memberships. As of June 2025, the party claims to have reached 24,000 members. As of October 2026, the party said it was at nearly 35,000 members.

== Leaders ==
Leader	Term in office		Notes
John Molberg	January 20, 2022	March 2024	Founder
Andrew Jacobson	March 2024	April 11, 2025	Interim
Cameron Davies	April 11, 2025	October 30, 2026	

== Election results ==
Legislative Assembly of Alberta
Election	Banner	Leader	Candidates	Votes	%	Seats	+/-	Position	Status
2023	Buffalo	John Molberg	1 / 87	106	0.01	0 / 87	New party	13th	No seats

=== By-elections ===
Banner	By-election	Date	Candidate	Votes	%	Position	Status
Republican	Edmonton-Strathcona	June 23, 2025	Ravina Chand	65	0.67	▼5th (Note: Down from the results of the Buffalo Party, which rebranded to the Republican Party in 2025.)	No seats
Republican	Edmonton-Ellerslie	June 23, 2025	Fred Munn	291	3.42	4th	No seats
Republican	Olds-Didsbury-Three Hills	June 23, 2025	Cameron Davies	2,705	17.66	3rd	No seats

== See also ==
- Republican Party (United States)
- Conservatism in Canada
- Wildrose Independence Party of Alberta
- 51st state
  - Parti 51 (1989–1990, 2016–2024)
- Maverick Party (2020–2025)
- Unionest Party (1980–1982)
