= 2022 United Conservative Party leadership election =

Provincial party election in Alberta, Canada

- October 6, 2022
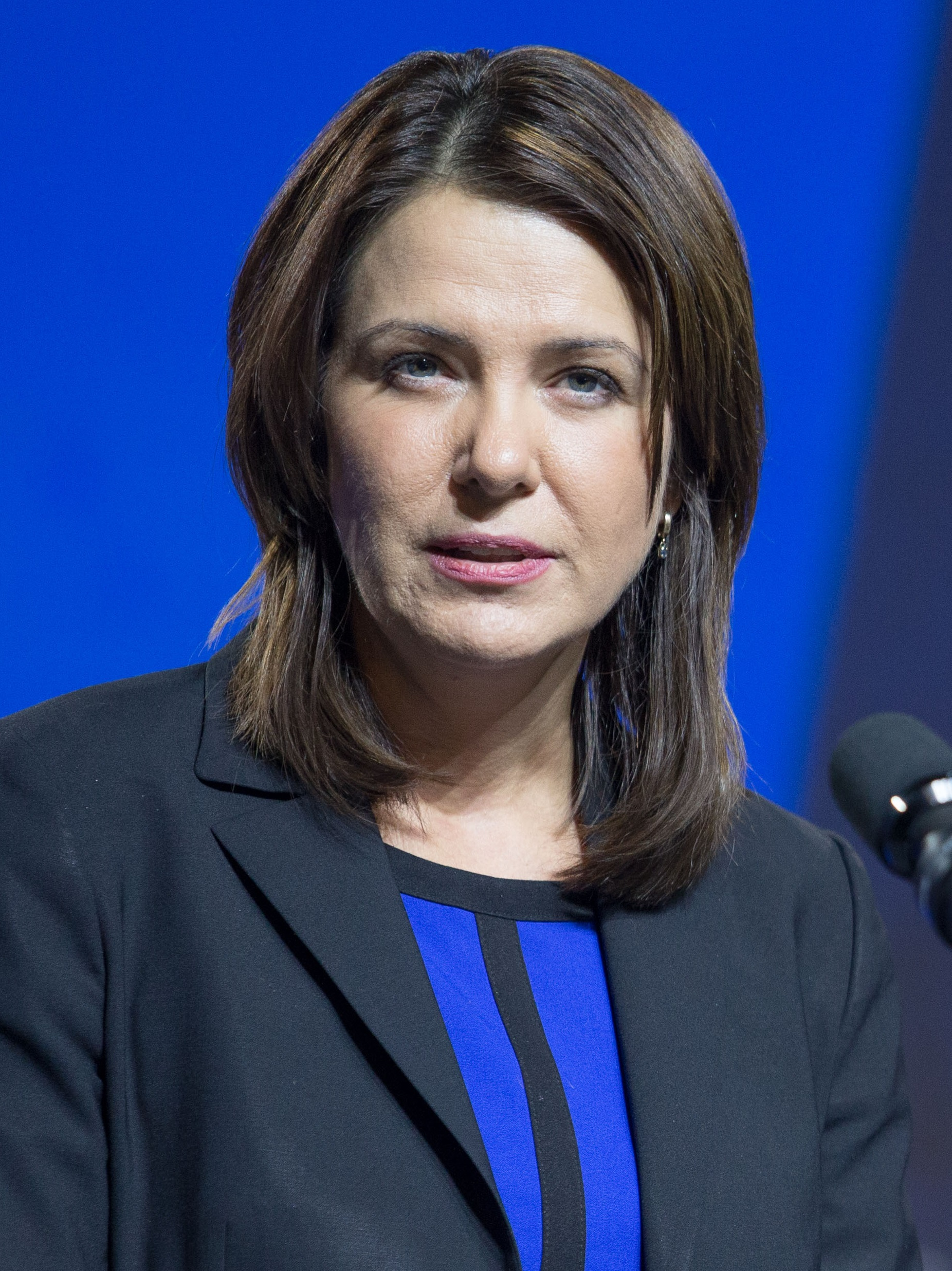

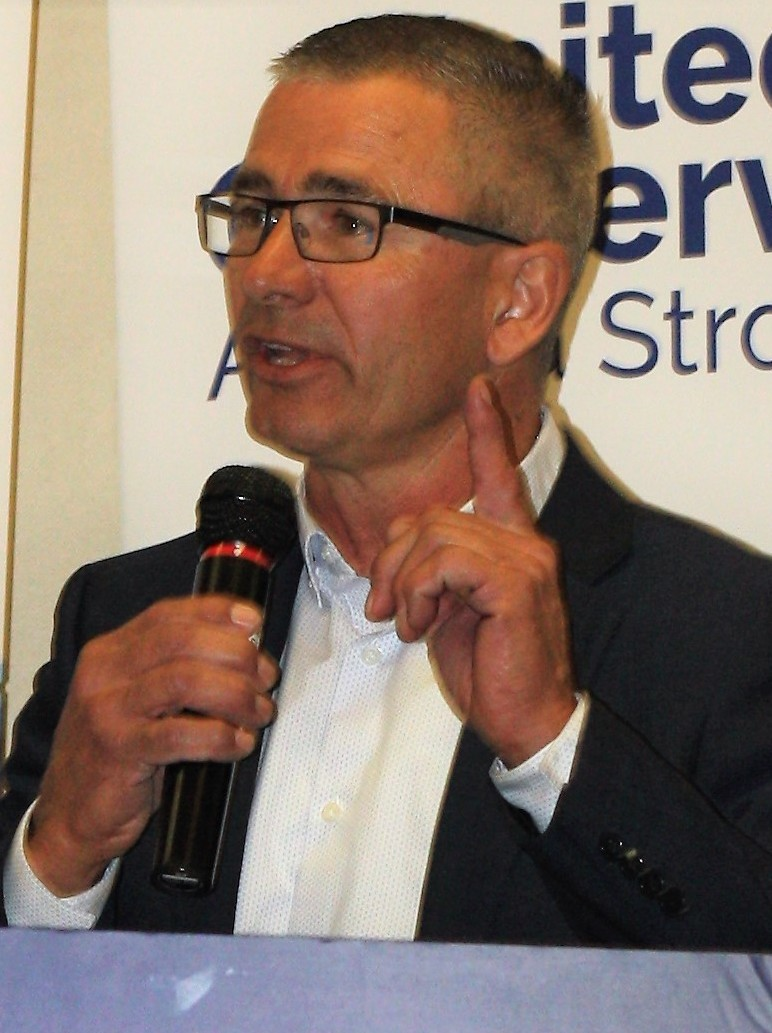

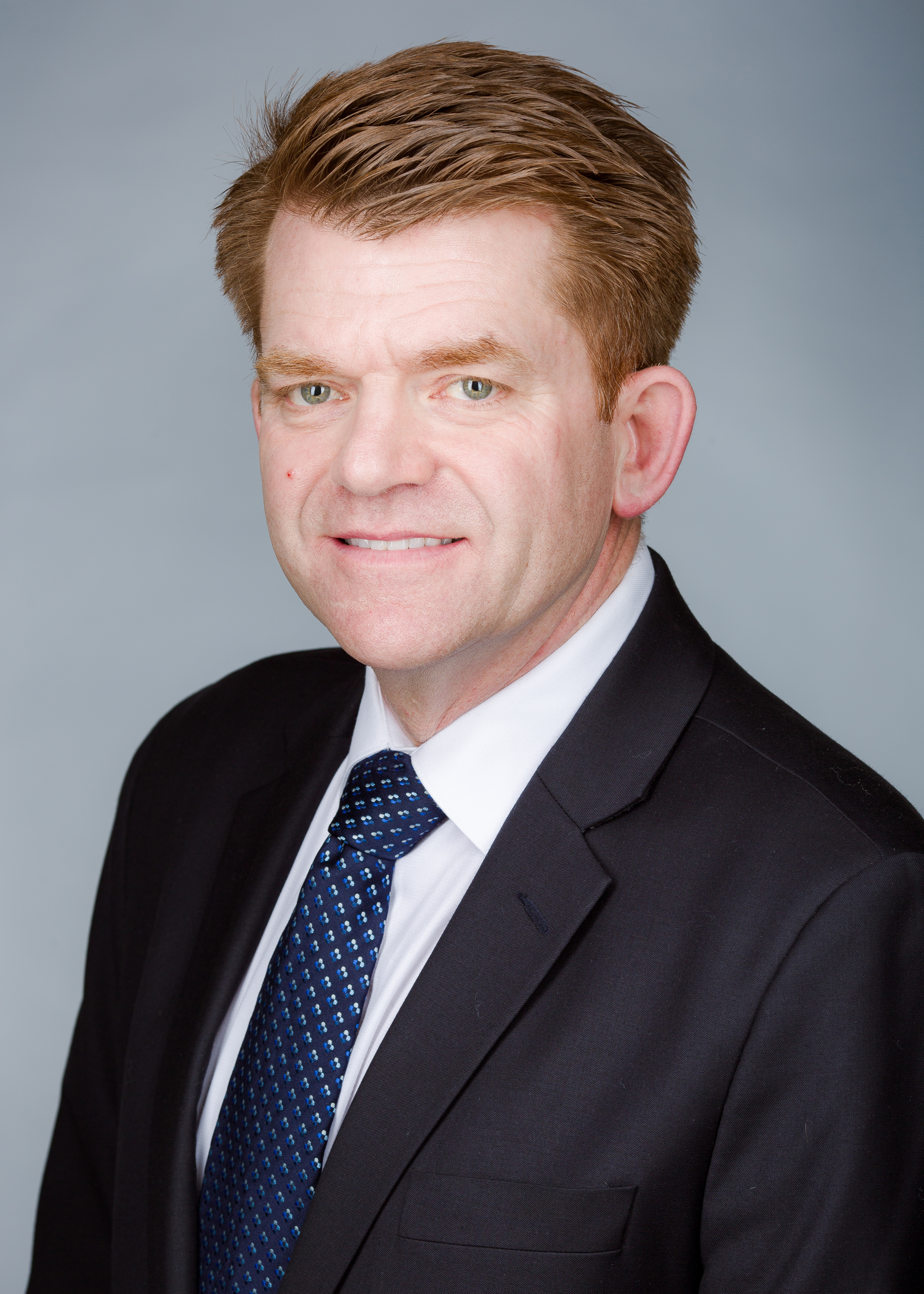

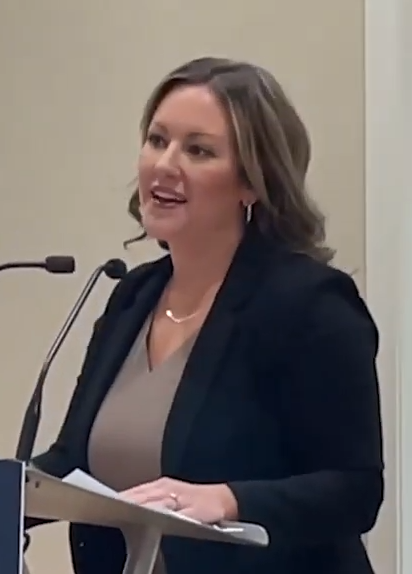

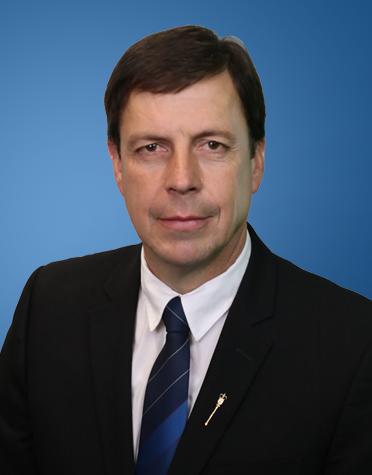

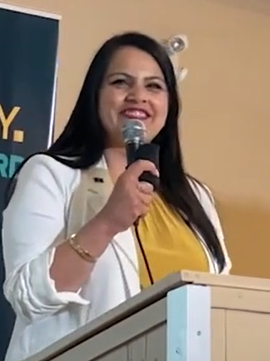

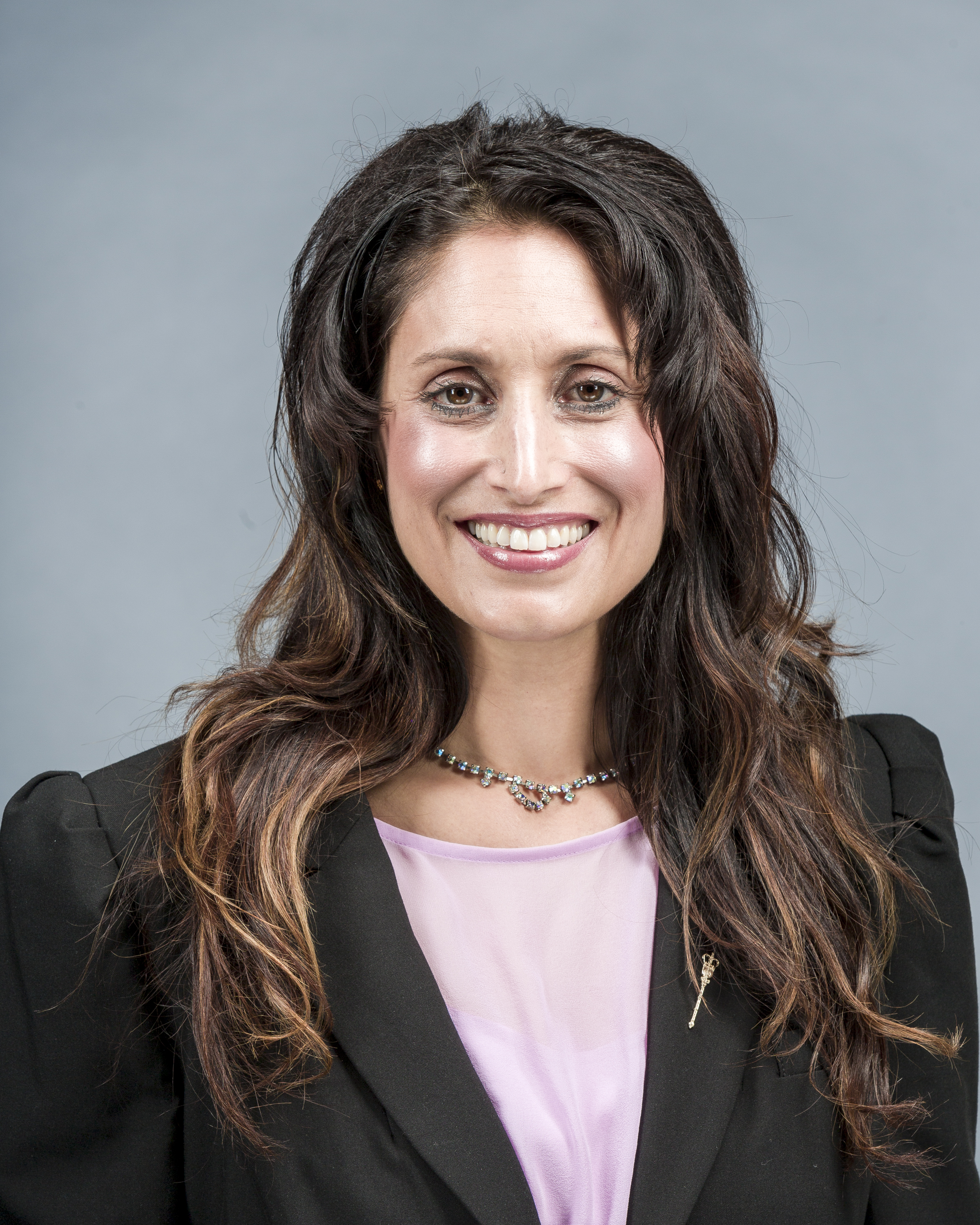
Candidate	Danielle Smith	Travis Toews	Brian Jean
Final ballot	42,423 (53.77%)	36,480 (46.23%)	Eliminated
First ballot	34,949 (41.3%)	24,831 (29.4%)	9,301 (11.0%)
Candidate	Rebecca Schulz	Todd Loewen	Rajan Sawhney
Final ballot	Eliminated	Eliminated	Eliminated
First ballot	5,835 (6.9%)	6,496 (7.7%)	1,787 (2.1%)
Candidate	Leela Aheer
Final ballot	Eliminated
First ballot	1,394 (1.6%)
Leader before election
Jason Kenney
Elected Leader
Danielle Smith

2022 United Conservative Party leadership election
- Date: October 6, 2022
- Convention: BMO Centre
- Resigning leader: Jason Kenney
- Won by: Danielle Smith
- Ballots: 6
- Candidates: 7
- Entrance fee: $150,000

The 2022 United Conservative Party leadership election was held on October 6 in Alberta to select a new leader of the United Conservative Party and Premier of Alberta. The leadership election was triggered following the May 18 leadership review in which the United Conservative Party membership voted 51.4 per cent in support of incumbent Premier Jason Kenney's leadership. In Kenney's speech following the announcement of the results, Kenney issued his resignation as leader of the United Conservative Party. Nominations for leadership of the United Conservative Party closed on July 20, with seven candidates meeting the nomination criteria. Party members selected their preference for leader using instant-runoff voting between September 2 and October 3.

On October 6, the result were announced with former Wildrose Party leader Danielle Smith being elected as leader of the United Conservative Party, defeating all other candidates including former Minister of Finance Travis Toews after six ballot counts. A week later on October 11, Smith was sworn in as the 19th Premier of Alberta.

== Background ==
=== Formation of the United Conservative Party and Jason Kenney's leadership ===
In March 2017, former federal cabinet minister Jason Kenney was elected Progressive Conservative Association of Alberta leader on a platform of joining with the Wildrose Party to form a unified right-of-centre party. Two months later Kenney and Wildrose leader Brian Jean jointly announced that the question of a merger between parties would be posed to the membership of each party through a vote, which on July 22, 2017, was approved by the membership in both parties.

Following the merger approval a leadership contest was held with three candidates, Kenney, former Wildrose leader Jean, and attorney Doug Schweitzer. Kenney was elected leader of the newly formed United Conservative Party with a plurality of 61.2 per cent of the vote. The Kenney lead United Conservative Party swept into power in the April 2019 Alberta general election, capturing 63 of 87 seats in the Legislative Assembly of Alberta, forming a majority government, and defeating the incumbent Alberta New Democratic Party led by Rachel Notley. On April 30, 2019, Jason Kenney was sworn in as the 18th premier of Alberta.

=== 2022 United Conservative Party leadership review ===
One year after the United Conservative Party was swept into power, the COVID-19 pandemic reached Alberta. Kenney's approval ratings amongst Albertans and members of the United Conservative Party began to slip following successive waves of the COVID-19 pandemic. Earlier Angus Reid polling reports said that, "Albertans have grown increasingly critical" of Premier Kenney and the UCP "government's response to the coronavirus, and the province's finances are in historically poor shape with oil revenues plummeting and pandemic-related economic shocks persisting." The June 2021 report said that "both sides" of Alberta's "political spectrum" have been angered by Kenney's response to the pandemic; they are critical of his approach to pandemic-related restrictions.

On September 17, 2021, Joel Mullan, United Conservative Party Vice President of policy, publicly called for the party board to consider initiating an early leadership review of Premier Kenney. Later in September, the United Conservative Party board announced a leadership review would take place at the party's annual general meeting in April 2022, ahead of the previous plans for a leadership review to take place in fall 2022. In March 2022, the United Conservative Party changed the format for the leadership review, moving to a mail-in ballot beginning in April, with results to be announced on May 18. The change in format was criticized by some party membership including Brian Jean.

On May 18, 2022, after receiving support from 51.4 per cent of the United Conservative Party members, Kenney announced he would step down as leader of the United Conservative Party. The United Conservative Party caucus met on May 19, and caucus chair Nathan Neudorf affirmed that Kenney would remain as leader of the party until a new leader was elected. Kenney subsequently informed the party secretary of his intention to resign as leader of the party after a new leader is elected.

== Leadership contest ==
The United Conservative Party leadership election process was conducted using instant-runoff voting, whereby voters may rank as many candidates as they desired and an individual is considered elected once they reached more than 50 per cent of the votes. With the instant-runoff format, if no candidate receives more than 50 per cent of the vote, the candidate with the lowest per cent of support is removed from the contest, and the removed candidate's ballots are redistributed to the remaining candidates as per the voter's next marked back-up preference. Rick Orman, a former Progressive Conservative Association of Alberta Member of the Legislative Assembly, and unsuccessful leadership candidate in the 1992 Progressive Conservative Association of Alberta leadership election served as the returning officer, and announced the results of each ballot.

Albertans were eligible to vote in the leadership election if they had purchased a party membership prior to August 12. Mail-in voting opened on September 2 and continued until October 3.

Some did not rank all the candidates. By the Sixth Count, about 6000 votes had become "exhausted". As exhausted votes accumulated, to win, the successful candidate had to merely acquire a majority of votes still in play, not majority of total valid votes cast in the First Count.

The total valid votes cast in the first round numbered 84,193. The majority required to win in the first round was 42,297. The lowest ranked candidate in each round was dropped, with their votes redistributed, until the sixth round when Smith's vote total exceeded 50% of votes still in play, which happened to be also more than half of votes cast in the 1st Count.

== Timeline ==
- May 18 - Party announces results of the 2022 UCP Special General Meeting with 51.4 per cent of party members voted in favour of Kenney staying on as leader. Kenney announces his intentions to resign. Brian Jean declares his candidacy.
- May 19 – UCP Caucus votes to allow Kenney to remain as leader until a new leader is elected by the party. Danielle Smith declares her candidacy.
- May 31 – Travis Toews declares his candidacy.
- June 1 – Todd Loewen declares his candidacy.
- June 2 – Bill Rock declares his candidacy.
- June 7 – Leela Aheer declares her candidacy.
- June 13 – Rajan Sawhney declares her candidacy.
- June 14 – Rebecca Schulz declares her candidacy.
- June 28 – Jon Horsman declares his candidacy.
- June 29 – Raj Sherman declares his candidacy.
- July 20 – Candidate entry deadline.
- August 12 – Membership cut-off date.
- September 2 – Mail-in voting begins.
- October 3 – Deadline for mail-in ballots.
- October 6 – Results announced.

== Candidates ==
=== Approved ===
==== Leela Aheer ====
Background

Leela Aheer, 51, is the MLA for Chestermere-Strathmore (2019–2023), former MLA for Chestermere-Rocky View (2015–2019) and Deputy Leader of the United Conservative Party (2017–2021). She is the former Minister of Culture, Multiculturalism & Status of Women (2019–2021).

Date candidacy declared: June 7
Date candidacy registered with Elections Alberta: June 13
Date candidacy approved: July 22
Campaign website: https://www.voteleela.ca/
Campaign slogan: Lead with Leela

==== Brian Jean ====
Background

Brian Jean, 59, is the MLA for Fort McMurray-Lac La Biche (2022–present). He was the final Leader of the Wildrose Party (2015–2017), Leader of the Opposition (2015–2017), MLA for Fort McMurray-Conklin (2015–2017), MP for Athabasca (2004–2006) and Fort McMurray—Athabasca (2006–2014), and Parliamentary Secretary to the Minister of Transport, Infrastructure and Communities (2006–2011).

Date candidacy declared: May 18
Date candidacy registered with Elections Alberta: May 31
Date candidacy approved: July 19
Campaign website: https://www.brianjean.ca/
Campaign slogan: Autonomy for Albertans

Endorsements of Brian Jean

MLAs: (2)

- Dave Hanson (MLA for Bonnyville-Cold Lake-St. Paul)
- Tany Yao (MLA for Fort McMurray-Wood Buffalo)

Former MLAs: (1)

- Wayne Anderson (MLA for Highwood, 2015–2019)

Former federal politicians: (1)

- Peter MacKay (Deputy Leader of the Conservative Party of Canada (2004–2015), Leader of the Progressive Conservative Party of Canada (2003), Minister of Justice and Attorney General (2013–2015), Minister of National Defence (2007–2013), Minister of Foreign Affairs (2006–2007), MP for Central Nova (1997–2015))

==== Todd Loewen ====
Background

Todd Loewen, 55, is the independent MLA for Central Peace-Notley (2019–present) and former MLA for Grande Prairie-Smoky (2015-2019). He was expelled from the UCP in 2021 after criticizing the government response to COVID-19. He previously served as the UCP Caucus Chair (2019-2021).

Date candidacy declared: June 1
Date candidacy registered with Elections Alberta: June 1
Date candidacy approved: July 22
Campaign website: https://www.toddloewen.com/
Campaign slogan: Your Alberta, Your Way

==== Rajan Sawhney ====
Background

Rajan Sawhney is the MLA for Calgary-North East (2019–2023) and Minister of Transportation (2021–2022). She is the former Minister of Community and Social Services (2019–2021).

Date candidacy declared: June 13
Date candidacy registered with Elections Alberta: June 16
Date candidacy approved: July 21
Campaign website: https://www.rajansawhney.ca/
Campaign slogan: Forward

Endorsements of Rajan Sawhney

MLAs: (0)

- ~~Angela Pitt (MLA for Airdrie-East)~~ (Switched endorsement to Danielle Smith on September 22)

==== Rebecca Schulz ====
Background

Rebecca Schulz is the MLA for Calgary-Shaw (2019–present) and Minister of Children's Services (2019–2022).

Date candidacy declared: June 14
Date candidacy registered with Elections Alberta: June 14
Date candidacy approved: July 22
Campaign website: https://www.rebeccaforleader.ca/
Campaign slogan: Back On Track

Endorsements of Rebecca Schulz

MLAs: (5)

- Jason Copping (MLA for Calgary-Varsity and Minister of Health)
- Michaela Frey (MLA for Brooks-Medicine Hat)
- Jeremy Nixon (MLA for Calgary-Klein)
- Ric McIver (MLA for Calgary-Hays and Minister of Municipal Affairs)
- Brad Rutherford (MLA for Leduc-Beaumont)

Federal politicians: (3)

- Laila Goodridge (MP for Fort McMurray—Cold Lake, former MLA for Fort McMurray-Lac La Biche, 2019-2021 and Fort McMurray-Conklin, 2018-2019)
- Matt Jeneroux (MP for Edmonton Riverbend, former MLA for Edmonton-South West, 2012-2015)
- Stephanie Kusie (MP for Calgary Midnapore)

Municipal politicians: (1)

- Dan McLean (Calgary City Councillor)

Former federal politicians: (1)

- Rona Ambrose (Interim Leader of the Conservative Party of Canada and Leader of the Official Opposition (2015–2017), MP for Sturgeon River—Parkland (2015–2017) and Edmonton—Spruce Grove, Alberta (2004–2015), Minister of Health (2013–2015), Minister of Public Works and Government Services (2010–2013), Minister of Labour (2008–2010), Minister of Intergovernmental Affairs (2007–2008), Minister of the Environment (2006–2007))

Former provincial politicians: (3)

- Tina Beaudry-Mellor (Saskatchewan MLA for Regina University, 2016-2020)
- Tim McMillan (Saskatchewan MLA for Lloydminster, 2007–2014, President and CEO of Canadian Association of Petroleum Producers, 2014–2022)
- Brad Wall (Premier of Saskatchewan (2007–2018), Leader of the Saskatchewan Party (2004–2018), Saskatchewan MLA for Swift Current (1999–2018))

==== Danielle Smith ====
Background

Danielle Smith, 51, is a UCP nomination candidate in Livingstone-Macleod. She was the MLA for Highwood (2012–2015), the Leader of the Opposition (2012–2014), and leader of the Wildrose Party (2009–2014).

Date candidacy declared: May 19
Date candidacy registered with Elections Alberta: June 1
Date candidacy approved: July 18
Campaign website: https://www.daniellesmith.ca/
Campaign slogan: Danielle Smith For Premier

Endorsements of Danielle Smith

MLAs: (9)

- Devin Dreeshen (MLA for Innisfail-Sylvan Lake)
- Mike Ellis (MLA for Calgary-West)
- Nate Glubish (MLA for Strathcona-Sherwood Park)
- Peter Guthrie (MLA for Airdrie-Cochrane)
- Kaycee Madu (MLA for Edmonton-South West)
- Nathan Neudorf (MLA for Lethbridge-East
- Angela Pitt (MLA for Airdrie-East)
- Pat Rehn (MLA for Lesser Slave Lake)
- Devinder Toor (MLA for Calgary-Falconridge)

Former MLAs: (3)

- Rob Anderson (MLA for Airdrie (2012–2015) and Airdrie-Chestermere (2008–2012)
- Bruce McCallister (MLA for Chestermere-Rocky View, 2012-2015)
- Peter Sandhu (MLA for Edmonton-Manning, 2008-2015)

Other prominent individuals: (2)

- Craig Chandler (Businessman, lobbyist, and political activist)
- Theoren Fleury (Former professional ice hockey player, author, and motivational speaker)

==== Travis Toews ====
Background

Travis Toews, 57, is the MLA for Grande Prairie-Wapiti (2019–2023) and former Minister of Finance and President of the Treasury Board (2019–2022).

Date candidacy declared: May 31
Date candidacy registered with Elections Alberta: May 30
Date candidacy approved: July 5
Campaign website: https://www.toewsforalberta.ca/
Campaign slogan: Toews For Alberta

Endorsements of Travis Toews

MLAs: (28)

- Tracy Allard (MLA for Grande Prairie)
- Mickey Amery (MLA for Calgary-Cross)
- Jackie Armstrong-Homeniuk (MLA for Fort Saskatchewan-Vegreville)
- Tanya Fir (MLA for Calgary-Peigan and Associate Minister of Red Tape Reduction)
- Shane Getson (MLA for Lac Ste. Anne-Parkland)
- ~~Nate Glubish (MLA for Strathcona-Sherwood Park)~~ (Switched endorsement to Danielle Smith on August 8)
- Nate Horner (MLA for Drumheller-Stettler and Minister of Agriculture, Forestry and Rural Economic Development)
- Grant Hunter (MLA for Taber-Warner)
- Whitney Issik (MLA for Calgary-Glenmore and Associate Minister of Status of Women)
- Matt Jones (MLA for Calgary-South East
- Adriana LaGrange (MLA for Red Deer-North and Minister of Education)
- Martin Long (MLA for West Yellowhead)
- Jackie Lovely (MLA for Camrose)
- Jason Luan (MLA for Calgary-Foothills and Minister of Community and Social Services)
- Demetrios Nicolaides (MLA for Calgary-Bow and Minister of Advanced Education)
- Jason Nixon (MLA for Rimbey-Rocky Mountain House-Sundre)
- Ron Orr (MLA for Lacombe-Ponoka and Minister of Culture)
- Josephine Pon (MLA for Calgary-Beddington and Minister of Seniors and Housing)
- ~~Pat Rehn (MLA for Lesser Slave Lake)~~ (Switched endorsement to Danielle Smith on July 26)
- Miranda Rosin (MLA for Banff-Kananaskis)
- Sonya Savage (MLA for Calgary-North West and Minister of Energy)
- Joseph Schow (MLA for Cardston-Siksika)
- Tyler Shandro (MLA for Calgary-Acadia and Minister of Justice and Solicitor-General)
- RJ Sigurdson (MLA for Highwood)
- Peter Singh (MLA for Calgary-East)
- Mark Smith (MLA for Drayton Valley-Devon)
- Searle Turton (MLA for Spruce Grove-Stony Plain)
- Jordan Walker (MLA for Sherwood Park)
- Dan Williams (MLA for Peace River)
- Rick Wilson (MLA for Maskwacis-Wetaskiwin)

Federal politicians: (3)

- Garnett Genuis (MP for Sherwood Park—Fort Saskatchewan)
- Arnold Viersen (MP for Peace River—Westlock)
- Chris Warkentin (MP for Grande Prairie-Mackenzie)

Indigenous politicians: (2)

- Billy Morin (Chief of Enoch Cree Nation)
- Ron Quintal (President of Fort McKay Métis Nation)

Former MLAs: (2)

- David Dorward (MLA for Edmonton-Gold Bar, 2012-2015)
- Heather Forsyth (MLA for Calgary-Fish Creek, 1993–2015 and Interim Leader of the Wildrose Party, 2014–2015)

Former federal politicians: (6)

- Diane Ablonczy (MP for Calgary—Nose Hill, 1997-2015 and Calgary North, 1993-1997)
- James Cumming (MP for Edmonton Centre, 2019-2021)
- Laurie Hawn (MP for Edmonton Centre, 2006-2015)
- Rob Merrifield (MP for Yellowhead, 2000-2014)
- Jag Sahota (MP for Calgary Skyview, 2019-2021)
- Kevin Sorenson (MP for Battle River-Crowfoot, 2015-2019 and Crowfoot, 2000-2015)

Other prominent individuals: (2)

- Jon Horsman (Former ATB Financial executive and withdrawn leadership candidate)
- W. Brett Wilson (Businessman)

=== Withdrew or failed to qualify ===
==== Jon Horsman ====
Background

Jon Horsman is a former ATB Financial executive. After withdrawing, he endorsed Travis Toews.

Date candidacy declared: June 28
Date candidacy registered with Elections Alberta: June 29
Date withdrew: July 20
Campaign website: http://jonhorsman.ca/
Campaign slogan: Refresh Alberta Now!

Endorsements of Jon Horsman

Municipal Politicians: (1)

- Bill Rock (Mayor of Amisk and withdrawn leadership candidate)

==== Bill Rock ====
Background

Bill Rock is the mayor of Amisk. He was the Wildrose Party candidate for Wetaskiwin-Camrose in the 2015 Alberta general election, finishing third. After withdrawing, he endorsed Jon Horsman.

Date candidacy declared: June 2
Date candidacy registered with Elections Alberta: June 2
Date withdrew: July 9
Campaign website: https://billrock.ca/
Campaign slogan: Bill Rock For UCP Leader

==== Raj Sherman ====
Background

Raj Sherman is the former leader of the Alberta Liberal Party (2011–2015), Leader of the Opposition (2011–2012), and MLA for Edmonton-Meadowlark (2008–2015). He currently works as an emergency physician. He requested an exemption to run in the race for not being a party member for 6 months, however it was rejected by the UCP Leadership Election Committee. Despite his exemption being denied, he still plans to run for the leadership and submit all the papers. On July 25, it was announced that Sherman was still denied a chance to enter the race.

Date candidacy declared: June 29
Date candidacy registered with Elections Alberta: June 24
Campaign website: https://electraj.ca/
Campaign slogan: Experienced. Caring. Decisive.

=== Declined ===
- Rona Ambrose, Interim Leader of the Conservative Party of Canada and Leader of the Official Opposition (2015–2017), MP for Sturgeon River—Parkland (2015–2017) and Edmonton—Spruce Grove, Alberta (2004–2015), Minister of Health (2013–2015), Minister of Public Works and Government Services (2010–2013), Minister of Labour (2008–2010), Minister of Intergovernmental Affairs (2007–2008), Minister of the Environment (2006–2007)
- Rob Anderson, former MLA for Airdrie (2012–2015) and Airdrie-Chestermere (2008–2012).
- Drew Barnes, Independent MLA for Cypress-Medicine Hat (2012–2023).
- Nathan Cooper, MLA for Olds-Didsbury-Three Hills (2015–2025), Speaker of the Alberta Legislative Assembly (2019–2025), Leader of the Opposition in Alberta (2017), Interim Leader of the United Conservative Party (2017), and Carstairs Municipal Councillor (2010-2015).
- Jason Copping, MLA for Calgary-Varsity (2019–2023), Minister of Health (2021–2023), and Minister of Labour and Immigration (2019–2021).
- Devin Dreeshen, MLA for Innisfail-Sylvan Lake (2018–present). He previously held the position of Minister of Agriculture and Forestry (2019–2021).
- Peter Guthrie, MLA for Airdrie-Cochrane (2019–present).
- Nate Horner, MLA for Drumheller-Stettler (2019–present) and Minister of Agriculture, Forestry and Rural Economic Development. (2021–2023). He previously served as the Associate Minister of Rural Economic Development (2021).
- Jason Kenney, Premier of Alberta (2019–2022), MLA for Calgary-Lougheed (2017–2022), Leader of the United Conservative Party (2017–2022), Leader of the Opposition in Alberta (2018-2019), Leader of the Progressive Conservative Association of Alberta (2017), Minister of National Defence (2015), Minister of Employment and Social Development (2013–2015), Minister of Citizenship, Immigration and Multiculturalism (2008–2013), MP for Calgary Midnapore, Alberta (2015–2016) and Calgary Southeast, Alberta (1997–2015).
- Adriana LaGrange, MLA for Red Deer-North (2019–present), Minister of Education (2019–2023), Red Deer Catholic Regional Division Trustee (2007–2018)
- Kaycee Madu, MLA for Edmonton-South West (2019–2023) and Minister Labour and Immigration (2022–2022). He previously served as Minister of Justice and Solicitor General (2020-2022) and as Minister of Municipal Affairs (2019-2020).
- Ric McIver, MLA for Calgary-Hays (2012–present) and Minister of Municipal Affairs (2021–2025). In addition to his current roles, he served as Alison Redford's Minister of Transportation (2012–2013) and previously held the posts of Minister of Transportation (2019–2021), Minister of Jobs, Skills, Training and Labour (2014–2015), Minister of Infrastructure (2013–2014), and Minister of Municipal Affairs (2012–2013). He was also the Interim Leader of the Progressive Conservative Association of Alberta (2015–2017), and City of Calgary Alderman Ward 12 (2001-2010).
- Nathan Neudorf, MLA for Lethbridge-East (2019–present) and Parliamentary Secretary to the Minister of Environment and Parks for Water Stewardship (2021–2022).
- Demetrios Nicolaides, MLA for Calgary-Bow (2019–present) and Minister of Advanced Education (2019–2023).
- Jason Nixon, MLA for Rimbey-Rocky Mountain House-Sundre (2015–present), Minister of Environment and Parks of Alberta (2019–2022), and former Leader of the Opposition in Alberta (2017–2018).
- Jeremy Nixon, MLA for Calgary-Klein (2019–2023) and Parliamentary Secretary to the Minister of Community and Social Services for Civil Society (2021–2022).
- Michelle Rempel Garner, MP for Calgary Nose Hill (2011–present). She has also held the positions of Shadow Minister for Natural Resources (2021–2022), Shadow Minister for Health (2020–2021), and Minister of Western Economic Diversification (2013–2015).
- Sonya Savage, MLA for Calgary-North West (2019–2023) and Minister of Energy (2019–2023).
- Doug Schweitzer, MLA for Calgary-Elbow (2019–2022), Minister of Jobs, Economy and Innovation (2020–2022), Minister of Justice and Solicitor General (2019–2020) and 2017 United Conservative Party leadership election contestant.
- Tyler Shandro, MLA for Calgary-Acadia (2019–2023), Minister of Justice and Solicitor General of Alberta (2022–2023), Minister of Labour and Immigration (2021–2022), and Minister of Health (2019–2021).
- Chris Warkentin, MP for Grande Prairie-Mackenzie (2006–present)

== Vote Count Process ==
Instant-runoff voting was used to determine the new party leader.

Danielle Smith led on the 1st Count and eventually accumulated a majority of the votes still in play to be declared the winner. Votes dropped out of play if they were to be transferred but bore no next usable back-up preference.

Candidate	Round 1		Round 2		Round 3		Round 4		Round 5		Round 6	
Candidate	Votes	%	Votes	%	Votes	%	Votes	%	Votes	%	Votes	%
Danielle Smith	34,949	41.3	34,981	41.4	35,095	41.7	38,496	46.2	39,270	47.7	42,423	53.77
Travis Toews	24,831	29.4	25,054	29.7	25,593	30.4	26,592	31.9	30,794	37.4	36,480	46.23
Brian Jean	9,301	11.1	9,504	11.3	10,157	12.1	11,251	13.5	12,203	14.8	Eliminated	
Todd Loewen	6,496	7.7	6,512	7.7	6,596	7.8	Eliminated					
Rebecca Schulz	5,835	6.9	6,180	7.3	6,784	8.0	6,972	8.4	Eliminated			
Rajan Sawhney	1,787	2.1	2,246	2.7	Eliminated							
Leela Aheer	1,394	1.6	Eliminated									
Total	84,593	100.00	84,405	100.00	84,225	100.00	83,317	100.00	82,267	100.00	78,903	100.00

% of Vote Share by Round

== Opinion polling ==
=== UCP supporters ===

Polling firm	Link	Last date of polling	Sample Size	Margin of error	Leela Aheer	Brian Jean	Todd Loewen	Rajan Sawhney	Rebecca Schulz	Danielle Smith	Travis Toews	Other
Mainstreet Research		September 28, 2022	5,327	±1.2%	2.48%	12.37%	4.26%	1.07%	8.09%	41.79%	29.94%	N/A
One Persuasion	(Note: Bell, Rick (September 16, 2022). "Bell: A new UCP leadership race poll, and yes, it's party members". Calgary Sun. Archived from the original on September 16, 2022. Note: poll commissioned by Smith Campaign.)	September 12, 2022	1,792	±2.3%	–	10.4%	7.5%	–	6.7%	42.5%	28.8%	N/A
Mainstreet Research		September 8, 2022	1,247	±2.8%	2.8%	20.2%	7.5%	0.6%	6.4%	43.9%	18.7%	N/A
Léger		September 5, 2022	316	N/A	3%	31%	3%	2%	4%	27%	29%	N/A
Léger		July 17, 2022	351	N/A	<1%	20%	2%	0%	2%	22%	15%	I don't know 31% Raj Sherman 2% Jon Horsman 1% Someone else 5%
Mainstreet Research		July 17, 2022	304	N/A	–	23.1%	2.2%	0.2%	0.9%	22.6%	13.7%	Undecided 36.1% Ric McIver 1.2%
Angus Reid		June 13, 2022	210	N/A	–	33%	8%	2%	7%	34%	25%	None 15% Jason Nixon 7% Other 7%
Leger		May 23, 2022	345	N/A	–	22%	–	–	–	18%	5%	Don't know 37% Someone else 14% Doug Schweitzer 3%

=== All Albertans ===
Polling firm	Link	Last date of polling	Sample Size	Margin of error	Leela Aheer	Brian Jean	Todd Loewen	Rajan Sawhney	Rebecca Schulz	Danielle Smith	Travis Toews	Other
Angus Reid		June 13, 2022	592	± 4%	–	23%	5%	2%	3%	24%	13%	None 44% Other 5% Jason Nixon 3%
Leger		May 23, 2022	1,000	± 3.1%	–	19%	–	–	–	14%	5%	Don't know 43% Someone else 17% Doug Schweitzer 3%
