= 31st Alberta Legislature =

Canadian Legislative Assembly

- Majority parliament
- Jun. 8, 2023 – present

Parliament leaders
- Premier: Danielle Smith; Oct. 11, 2022 – present
- Cabinet: Smith ministry
- Leader of the Opposition: Rachel Notley; Apr. 16, 2019 – Jun. 22, 2024
- Christina Gray; Jun. 23, 2024 – Jul. 11, 2025
- Naheed Nenshi; Jul. 12, 2025 – present

Party caucuses
- Government: United Conservative
- Opposition: New Democratic
- Unrecognized: Progressive Tory

Legislative Assembly
- Seating arrangements of the Legislative Assembly
- Speaker of the Assembly: Nathan Cooper; May. 21, 2019 – May. 12, 2025
- Ric McIver; May. 13, 2025 – present
- Government House leader: Joseph Schow; Oct. 24, 2022 – present
- Opposition House leader: Christina Gray; Feb. 8, 2021 – present
- Members: 87 MLA seats

Sovereign
- Monarch: Charles III; Sep. 8, 2022 – present
- Lieutenant governor: Salma Lakhani; Aug. 26, 2020 – present

Sessions
- 1st session 20 June 2023 – 22 October 2025
- 2nd session 23 October 2025 – present
← 30th	→ 32nd

The 31st Alberta Legislative Assembly was constituted after the general election on 29 May 2023. The United Conservative Party (UCP), led by incumbent Premier Danielle Smith, won a majority of seats (49) and formed the government. The New Democrats, led by former Premier Rachel Notley, won the second most seats (38) and formed the official opposition.

== First session ==
The first session began on 20 June 2023. Jennifer Johnson, who had appeared on the election ballot as a UCP candidate but was disavowed by the party during the campaign after making comments comparing transgender children to faeces, was seated as an independent on the Opposition side. After election of officers of the assembly, including Nathan Cooper's re-election as speaker, the assembly adjourned for the summer.

The session resumed on 30 October with the speech from the throne. Among the bills passed over the ensuing months was an amendment to the Election Act, changing the fixed election date to the third Monday in October instead of the last Monday in May – this bill passed the assembly on 28 May 2024 and received royal assent on 30 May. The assembly adjourned for the summer on 29 May.

On 22 June, Naheed Nenshi was elected leader of the Alberta NDP. Because Nenshi did not have a seat in the assembly, he designated Christina Gray on 23 June to be Opposition leader in place of Rachel Notley.

On 1 July, Shannon Phillips resigned as MLA for Lethbridge-West. Rob Miyashiro of the NDP was elected on 18 December in the resulting byelection.

On 9 October, Johnson returned to the UCP caucus. The first session resumed with its fall sitting starting on 28 October.

On 5 November, Mickey Amery introduced Bill 31, which, among other things, empowered the Electoral Boundary Commission to add two more electoral districts, bringing the total to 89. This bill received royal assent on 5 December.

On 30 December, Notley resigned as MLA for Edmonton-Strathcona.

On 7 March 2025, Scott Sinclair was removed from the UCP caucus for criticizing the government's budget.

On 25 March 2025, Rod Loyola resigned from the legislature to run in the federal election as the Liberal candidate for the newly formed Edmonton Gateway riding.

On 16 April, Peter Guthrie was expelled from the UCP caucus because he publicly criticized the government in the matter of the dismissal of Alberta Health Services' board of directors and chief executive officer.

On 13 May, the assembly elected Ric McIver as speaker, after Nathan Cooper announced his plan to resign as an MLA at the conclusion of the spring sitting. The assembly adjourned for the summer on 14 May, and Cooper resigned as MLA for Olds-Didsbury-Three Hills on 22 May.

Three by-elections held on 23 June 2025 returned members from the same parties elected in those ridings in 2023. Nenshi (NDP) won Edmonton-Strathcona, Gurtej Singh Brar (NDP) won Edmonton-Ellerslie, and Tara Sawyer (UCP) won Olds-Didsbury-Three Hills.

The first session was prorogued on 22 October 2025.

== Second session ==
The second session opened with the speech from the throne on 23 October 2025. The government introduced Bill 2, the Back to School Act, on 27 October, and through fast-tracking of assembly procedures, the bill was passed on 28 October. This act, which uses the notwithstanding clause to override fundamental freedoms, legal rights, and equality rights, ended the teachers' strike that had begun on 6 October.

On 9 December 2025, Peter Guthrie was announced as leader of the Alberta Party, and became the party's first representative in the Legislature since the 2019 Alberta general election. Scott Sinclair remained an independent, despite having jointly announced in with Guthrie in July that the two would be joining the Alberta Party and rebrand to the Progressive Conservatives. In November, the United Conservative Party filed a lawsuit alleging conspiracy by Guthrie and Sinclair for their attempted use of the Progressive Conservative name. In December, the government passed Bill 14, the Justice Statutes Amendment Act, 2025, which banned new or rebranding political parties from adopting names which resemble the name or abbreviation of another registered party or predecessor parties, explicitly including the word "conservative" among 11 others. The Alberta Party officially changed its name to the Progressive Tory Party of Alberta on 18 December.

On 26 March 2026, the Electoral Boundaries Commission submitted its report recommending the limits of 89 ridings.

In May 2026, Sinclair returned to the UCP caucus.

A by-election was held for Calgary-Shaw on 14 September 2026, with NDP candidate Kyle Campbell gaining the seat from the UCP.

== Members ==
Member	Party	Electoral district	First elected / previously elected	No. of terms
Peter Guthrie	United Conservative	Airdrie-Cochrane	2019	2nd term
Peter Guthrie	Independent	Airdrie-Cochrane	2019	2nd term
Peter Guthrie	Progressive Tory	Airdrie-Cochrane	2019	2nd term
Angela Pitt	United Conservative	Airdrie-East	2015	3rd term
Glenn van Dijken	United Conservative	Athabasca-Barrhead-Westlock	2015	3rd term
Sarah Elmeligi	New Democratic	Banff-Kananaskis	2023	1st term
Scott Cyr	United Conservative	Bonnyville-Cold Lake-St. Paul	2015, 2023	2nd term*
Danielle Smith	United Conservative	Brooks-Medicine Hat	2012, (Note: Highwood (first elected as a Wildrose)) 2022	3rd term*
Diana Batten	New Democratic	Calgary-Acadia	2023	1st term
Amanda Chapman	New Democratic	Calgary-Beddington	2023	1st term
Irfan Sabir	New Democratic	Calgary-Bhullar-McCall	2015	3rd term
Demetrios Nicolaides	United Conservative	Calgary-Bow	2019	2nd term
Joe Ceci	New Democratic	Calgary-Buffalo	2015	3rd term
Mickey Amery	United Conservative	Calgary-Cross	2019	2nd term
Janet Eremenko	New Democratic	Calgary-Currie	2023	1st term
Peter Singh	United Conservative	Calgary-East	2019	2nd term
Julia Hayter	New Democratic	Calgary-Edgemont	2023	1st term
Samir Kayande	New Democratic	Calgary-Elbow	2023	1st term
Parmeet Singh Boparai	New Democratic	Calgary-Falconridge	2023	1st term
Myles McDougall	United Conservative	Calgary-Fish Creek	2023	1st term
Court Ellingson	New Democratic	Calgary-Foothills	2023	1st term
Nagwan Al-Guneid	New Democratic	Calgary-Glenmore	2023	1st term
Ric McIver	United Conservative	Calgary-Hays	2012	4th term
Lizette Tejada	New Democratic	Calgary-Klein	2023	1st term
Eric Bouchard	United Conservative	Calgary-Lougheed	2023	1st term
Kathleen Ganley	New Democratic	Calgary-Mountain View	2015	3rd term
Muhammad Yaseen	United Conservative	Calgary-North	2019	2nd term
Gurinder Brar	New Democratic	Calgary-North East	2023	1st term
Rajan Sawhney	United Conservative	Calgary-North West	2019	2nd term
Tanya Fir	United Conservative	Calgary-Peigan	2019	2nd term
Rebecca Schulz (until May 15, 2026)	United Conservative	Calgary-Shaw	2019	2nd term
Kyle Campbell (from September 14, 2026)	New Democratic	Calgary-Shaw	2026	1st term
Matt Jones	United Conservative	Calgary-South East	2019	2nd term
Luanne Metz	New Democratic	Calgary-Varsity	2023	1st term
Mike Ellis	United Conservative	Calgary-West	2014	4th term
Jackie Lovely	United Conservative	Camrose	2019	2nd term
Joseph Schow	United Conservative	Cardston-Siksika	2019	2nd term
Todd Loewen	United Conservative	Central Peace-Notley	2015	3rd term
Chantelle de Jonge	United Conservative	Chestermere-Strathmore	2023	1st term
Justin Wright	United Conservative	Cypress-Medicine Hat	2023	1st term
Andrew Boitchenko	United Conservative	Drayton Valley-Devon	2023	1st term
Nathan Horner	United Conservative	Drumheller-Stettler	2019	2nd term
Peggy Wright	New Democratic	Edmonton-Beverly-Clareview	2023	1st term
Nicole Goehring	New Democratic	Edmonton-Castle Downs	2015	3rd term
David Shepherd	New Democratic	Edmonton-City Centre	2015	3rd term
Sharif Haji	New Democratic	Edmonton-Decore	2023	1st term
Rod Loyola (until March 25, 2025)	New Democratic	Edmonton-Ellerslie	2015	3rd term
Gurtej Singh Brar (from June 23, 2025)	New Democratic	Edmonton-Ellerslie	2025	1st term
Sarah Hoffman	New Democratic	Edmonton-Glenora	2015	3rd term
Marlin Schmidt	New Democratic	Edmonton-Gold Bar	2015	3rd term
Janis Irwin	New Democratic	Edmonton-Highlands-Norwood	2019	2nd term
Heather Sweet	New Democratic	Edmonton-Manning	2015	3rd term
Lorne Dach	New Democratic	Edmonton-McClung	2015	3rd term
Jasvir Deol	New Democratic	Edmonton-Meadows	2019	2nd term
Christina Gray	New Democratic	Edmonton-Mill Woods	2015	3rd term
David Eggen	New Democratic	Edmonton-North West	2004, 2012	5th term*
Lori Sigurdson	New Democratic	Edmonton-Riverview	2015	3rd term
Jodi Calahoo Stonehouse	New Democratic	Edmonton-Rutherford	2023	1st term
Rhiannon Hoyle	New Democratic	Edmonton-South	2023	1st term
Nathan Ip	New Democratic	Edmonton-South West	2023	1st term
Rachel Notley (until December 30, 2024)	New Democratic	Edmonton-Strathcona	2008	5th term
Naheed Nenshi (from June 23, 2025)	New Democratic	Edmonton-Strathcona	2025	1st term
Brooks Arcand-Paul	New Democratic	Edmonton-West Henday	2023	1st term
Rakhi Pancholi	New Democratic	Edmonton-Whitemud	2019	2nd term
Brian Jean	United Conservative	Fort McMurray-Lac La Biche	2015, (Note: First elected as a Wildrose) 2022	3rd term*
Tany Yao	United Conservative	Fort McMurray-Wood Buffalo	2015	3rd term
Jackie Armstrong-Homeniuk	United Conservative	Fort Saskatchewan-Vegreville	2019	2nd term
Nolan Dyck	United Conservative	Grande Prairie	2023	1st term
Ron Wiebe	United Conservative	Grande Prairie-Wapiti	2023	1st term
RJ Sigurdson	United Conservative	Highwood	2019	2nd term
Devin Dreeshen	United Conservative	Innisfail-Sylvan Lake	2018	3rd term
Shane Getson (until October 26, 2026)	United Conservative	Lac Ste. Anne-Parkland	2019	2nd term
Jennifer Johnson	Independent	Lacombe-Ponoka	2023	1st term
Jennifer Johnson	United Conservative	Lacombe-Ponoka	2023	1st term
Brandon Lunty	United Conservative	Leduc-Beaumont	2023	1st term
Scott Sinclair	United Conservative	Lesser Slave Lake	2023	1st term
Scott Sinclair	Independent	Lesser Slave Lake	2023	1st term
Scott Sinclair	United Conservative	Lesser Slave Lake	2023	1st term
Nathan Neudorf	United Conservative	Lethbridge-East	2019	2nd term
Shannon Phillips (until July 1, 2024)	New Democratic	Lethbridge-West	2015	3rd term
Rob Miyashiro (from December 18, 2024)	New Democratic	Lethbridge-West	2024	1st term
Chelsae Petrovic	United Conservative	Livingstone-Macleod	2023	1st term
Rick Wilson	United Conservative	Maskwacis-Wetaskiwin	2019	2nd term
Dale Nally	United Conservative	Morinville-St. Albert	2019	2nd term
Nathan Cooper (until May 22, 2025)	United Conservative	Olds-Didsbury-Three Hills	2015	3rd term
Tara Sawyer (from June 23, 2025)	United Conservative	Olds-Didsbury-Three Hills	2025	1st term
Dan Williams	United Conservative	Peace River	2019	2nd term
Adriana LaGrange	United Conservative	Red Deer-North	2019	2nd term
Jason Stephan	United Conservative	Red Deer-South	2019	2nd term
Jason Nixon	United Conservative	Rimbey-Rocky Mountain House-Sundre	2015	3rd term
Kyle Kasawski	New Democratic	Sherwood Park	2023	1st term
Searle Turton	United Conservative	Spruce Grove-Stony Plain	2019	2nd term
Marie Renaud	New Democratic	St. Albert	2015	3rd term
Nate Glubish	United Conservative	Strathcona-Sherwood Park	2019	2nd term
Grant Hunter	United Conservative	Taber-Warner	2015	3rd term
Garth Rowswell	United Conservative	Vermilion-Lloydminster-Wainwright	2019	2nd term
Martin Long	United Conservative	West Yellowhead	2019	2nd term

== Seating plan ==
- Party leaders are italicized. Bold indicates cabinet minister.

			Schmidt	Brar	Metz	Campbell	Goehring	Ceci		Dach	L. Sigurdson	Miyashiro	Deol
	Boparai	Hayter	Tejada	Batten	Irwin	Ip	Brar	Ganley		Kasawski	Eremenko	Hoyle	Chapman	Renaud	Kayande		Guthrie
	Elmeligi	Al-Guneid	Arcand-Paul	Sabir	Hoffman	Calahoo Stonehouse	Eggen	Gray	Nenshi	Pancholi	Ellingson	Calahoo Stonehouse	Shepherd	Haji	P. Wright	Sweet
McIver
	**RJ Sigurdson**	**Nicolaides**	**Sawhney**	**Williams**	**Glubish**	**LaGrange**	**Nixon**	**Schow**	**Smith**	**Ellis**	**Amery**	**Neudorf**	**Loewen**	**Wilson**	**Jean**	**Dreeshen**	**Fir**
	Pitt	van Dijken	Stephan	**Boitchenko**	**McDougall**	**Long**	**Nally**	Lunty		**Hunter**	**Sawyer**	**J. Wright**	**Turton**	**Yaseen**	Rowswell	Cyr
			Armstong-Homeniuk	Johnson	Wiebe	Petrovic	Horner	Dyck		Yao	Jones	de Jonge	Bouchard	Sinclair	Lovely

== By-elections ==
Riding	Date	Incumbent	Party	Winner	Party	Cause	Retained
Lethbridge-West	18 December 2024	Shannon Phillips	New Democratic	Rob Miyashiro	New Democratic	Resigned for personal reasons.	Yes
Edmonton-Strathcona	June 23, 2025	Rachel Notley	New Democratic	Naheed Nenshi	New Democratic	Retired from politics.	Yes
Edmonton-Ellerslie	June 23, 2025	Rod Loyola	New Democratic	Gurtej Singh Brar	New Democratic	Resigned to run in the 2025 Canadian federal election.	Yes
Olds-Didsbury-Three Hills	June 23, 2025	Nathan Cooper	United Conservative Party	Tara Sawyer	United Conservative Party	Resigned to become Alberta's representative in Washington, D.C.	Yes
Calgary-Shaw	14 September 2026	Rebecca Schulz	United Conservative Party	Kyle Campbell	New Democratic	Resigned.	No

== Officeholders ==
=== Presiding officers ===
Office	Photo	Party	Officer	Riding	Since	Until
Speaker		UCP	Nathan Cooper	Olds-Didsbury-Three Hills	21 May 2019	12 May 2025
Speaker		UCP	Ric McIver	Calgary-Hays	13 May 2025	Present
Deputy Speaker and Chair of Committees		UCP	Angela Pitt	Airdrie-East	21 May 2019	Present
Deputy Chair of Committees		UCP	Glenn van Dijken	Athabasca-Barrhead-Westlock	20 June 2023	Present

=== Government leadership (United Conservative) ===
Office	Photo	Officer	Riding	Since	Until
Premier of Alberta		Danielle Smith	Brooks-Medicine Hat	11 October 2022	present
Deputy Premier		Mike Ellis	Calgary-West	9 June 2023	present
House Leader		Joseph Schow	Cardston-Siksika	24 October 2022	present
Deputy House Leader		Mickey Amery	Calgary-Cross	24 October 2022	present
Deputy House Leader		Dan Williams	Peace River	13 July 2023	present
Chief Government Whip		Shane Getson	Lac Ste. Anne-Parkland	9 June 2023	15 May 2025
Chief Government Whip		Grant Hunter	Taber-Warner	16 May 2025	2 January 2026
Chief Government Whip		Justin Wright	Cypress-Medicine Hat	2 January 2026	21 May 2026
Chief Government Whip		Brandon Lunty	Leduc-Beaumont	22 May 2026	present
Deputy Government Whip		Tany Yao	Fort McMurray-Wood Buffalo	18 October 2023	present
Caucus Chair		Nathan Neudorf	Lethbridge-East	June 2021	present

=== Opposition leadership (New Democratic) ===
Office	Photo	Officer	Riding	Since	Until
Leader of the Opposition		Rachel Notley	Edmonton-Strathcona	16 April 2019	22 June 2024
Leader of the Opposition		Christina Gray	Edmonton-Mill Woods	23 June 2024	11 July 2025
Leader of the Opposition		Naheed Nenshi	Edmonton-Strathcona	12 July 2025	present
Deputy Leader		Sarah Hoffman	Edmonton-Glenora	13 May 2019	27 January 2024
Deputy Leader		Christina Gray	Edmonton-Mill Woods	13 February 2024	24 June 2024
Deputy Leader		Rakhi Pancholi	Edmonton-Whitemud	24 June 2024	present
House Leader		Christina Gray	Edmonton-Mill Woods	8 February 2021	present
Deputy House Leader		Irfan Sabir	Calgary-Bhullar-McCall	20 October 2020	present
Deputy House Leader		Heather Sweet	Edmonton-Manning	27 February 2023	28 January 2024
Deputy House Leader		David Shepherd	Edmonton-City Centre	11 September 2024	present
Whip		David Eggen	Edmonton-North West	21 May 2019	11 September 2024
Whip		Kathleen Ganley	Calgary-Mountain View	11 September 2024	17 September 2026
Whip		Rakhi Pancholi	Edmonton-Whitemud	18 September 2026	present
Deputy Whip		Sarah Hoffman	Edmonton-Glenora	27 June 2023	27 January 2024
Deputy Whip		Heather Sweet	Edmonton-Manning	28 January 2024	11 September 2024
Deputy Whip		Janis Irwin	Edmonton-Highlands-Norwood	11 September 2024	present
Deputy Assistant Whip		Samir Kayande	Calgary-Elbow	27 June 2023	11 September 2024
Deputy Assistant Whip		Amanda Chapman	Calgary-Beddington	11 September 2024	present
Caucus Chair		Joe Ceci	Calgary-Buffalo	13 May 2019	11 September 2024
Caucus Chair		David Eggen	Edmonton-North West	11 September 2024	present
Deputy Caucus Chair		Peggy Wright	Edmonton-Beverly-Clareview	27 June 2023	present
