= Chestermere-Rocky View =

Defunct provincial electoral district in Alberta, Canada

Alberta electoral district
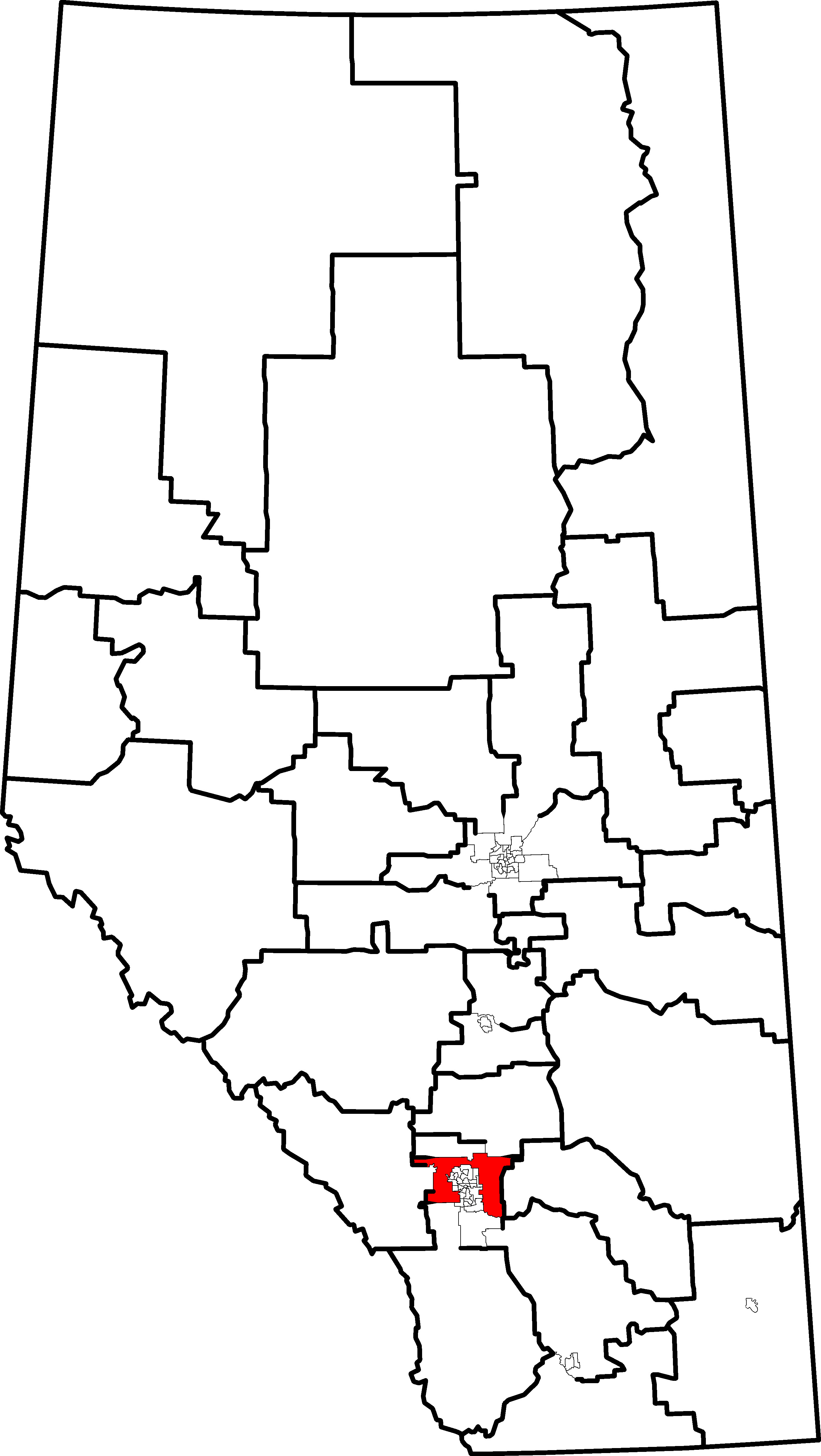
- 2010 boundaries

Defunct provincial electoral district
- Legislature: Legislative Assembly of Alberta
- District created: 2010
- District abolished: 2019
- First contested: 2012
- Last contested: 2015

Chestermere-Rocky View was a provincial electoral district in Alberta, Canada, mandated to return a single member to the Legislative Assembly of Alberta using the first-past-the-post method of voting from 2012 to 2019.

== History ==
=== Boundary history ===
Chestermere-Rocky View was created from large portions of the old electoral district of Airdrie-Chestermere and Foothills-Rocky View in the 2010 Alberta boundary re-distribution. The district surrounds the western, northern and eastern boundaries of the city of Calgary.

The electoral district was abolished in the 2017 electoral district re-distribution prior to the 2019 Alberta general election. The area east of Calgary (which contains a majority of Chestermere-Rocky View's population) will be transferred to Chestermere-Strathmore, the areas north of Highway 564 and east of Highway 2 will be transferred to Airdrie-East, the areas west of Highway 2 and north of the Bow River to Airdrie-Cochrane, and the areas west of Calgary (including the Tsuu T'ina Reserve) to Banff-Kananaskis.

56 Chestermere-Rocky View 2010 boundaries
Bordering districts
North	East	Middle	West	South
Airdrie and Olds-Didsbury-Three Hills	Strathmore-Brooks	Calgary-Bow, Calgary-Elbow, Calgary-Foothills, Calgary-Fort, Calgary-Glenmore, Calgary-Greenway, Calgary-Lougheed, Calgary-McCall, Calgary-McKay-Nose Hill, Calgary-North West, Calgary-South East and Calgary-West	Banff-Cochrane	Livingstone-Macleod, Highwood and Little Bow
Legal description from the Statutes of Alberta 2010, Electoral Divisions Act

Members of the Legislative Assembly for Chestermere-Rocky View
Assembly	Years	Member	Party
See Airdrie-Chestermere and Foothills- Rocky View 2004-2012
28th	2012–2014	Bruce McAllister	Wildrose
28th	2014–2015	Bruce McAllister	PC
29th	2015–2017	Leela Aheer	Wildrose
29th	2017-2019	Leela Aheer	UCP
See Airdrie-Cochrane, Airdrie-East, Banff-Kananaskis and Chestermere-Strathmore 2019-

=== Representation history ===
The electoral district's antecedents had elected Progressive Conservative (PC) candidates with solid majorities. However, in 2012, Chestermere-Rocky View was picked up by the Wildrose Party with one of the best results in the province for that party.

MLA Bruce McAllister subsequently crossed the floor to the PCs during the premiership of Jim Prentice with most of the Wildrose caucus. Although he was one of the few former Wildrose MLAs to win the PC nomination in his riding for the 2015 election, he was defeated by Wildrose candidate Leela Aheer by a slim margin.

Aheer then crossed the floor to the United Conservative Party (UCP) when the PCs and Wildrose decided to merge. She was named deputy leader of the UCP by leader Jason Kenney in late 2017. As the riding was set to be abolished in 2019, Aheer has indicated her intent to run in Chestermere-Strathmore.

In its short existence, Chestermere-Rocky View therefore elected Wildrose MLAs twice, but neither served their full term with the party.

== Legislative election results ==
=== 2012 ===
2012 Alberta general election
Party	Candidate	Votes	%	±%
Wildrose	Bruce McAllister	10,165	58.36%	–
Progressive Conservative	Ted Morton	6,154	35.33%	–
Liberal	Sian Ramsden	564	3.24%	–
New Democratic	Nathan Salmon	536	3.08%	–
Total		17,419	–	–
Rejected, spoiled, and declined		59	–	–
Eligible electors / turnout		31,652	55.22%	–
Wildrose pickup new district.				
Source(s) Source: "54 - Chestermere-Rocky View Official Results 2012 Alberta general election". officialresults.elections.ab.ca. Elections Alberta.

=== 2015 ===
2015 Alberta general election
Party	Candidate	Votes	%	±%
Wildrose	Leela Aheer	7,676	37.04%	-21.32%
Progressive Conservative	Bruce McAllister	7,454	35.97%	0.64%
New Democratic	William James Pelech	3,706	17.88%	14.80%
Independent	Jamie Lall	1,093	5.27%	–
Green	Coral Bliss Taylor	405	1.95%	–
Independent	Matt Grant	391	1.89%	–
Total		20,725	–	–
Rejected, spoiled and declined		91	–	–
Eligible electors / turnout		34,928	59.60%	4.38%
Wildrose hold		Swing		-10.98%
Source(s) Source: "54 - Chestermere-Rocky View Official Results 2015 Alberta general election". officialresults.elections.ab.ca. Elections Alberta.

== Student vote results ==
=== 2012 ===
2012 Alberta student vote results
Affiliation	Candidate	Votes	%
Progressive Conservative	Ted Morton	258	29.22%
Wildrose	Bruce McAllister	454	51.42%
Liberal	Siân Ramsden	126	14.27%
New Democratic	Nathan Salmon	45	5.10%
Total		883	100%

== See also ==
- List of Alberta provincial electoral districts
- Canadian provincial electoral districts
