= Airdrie (electoral district) =

Defunct provincial electoral district in Alberta, Canada

Alberta electoral district
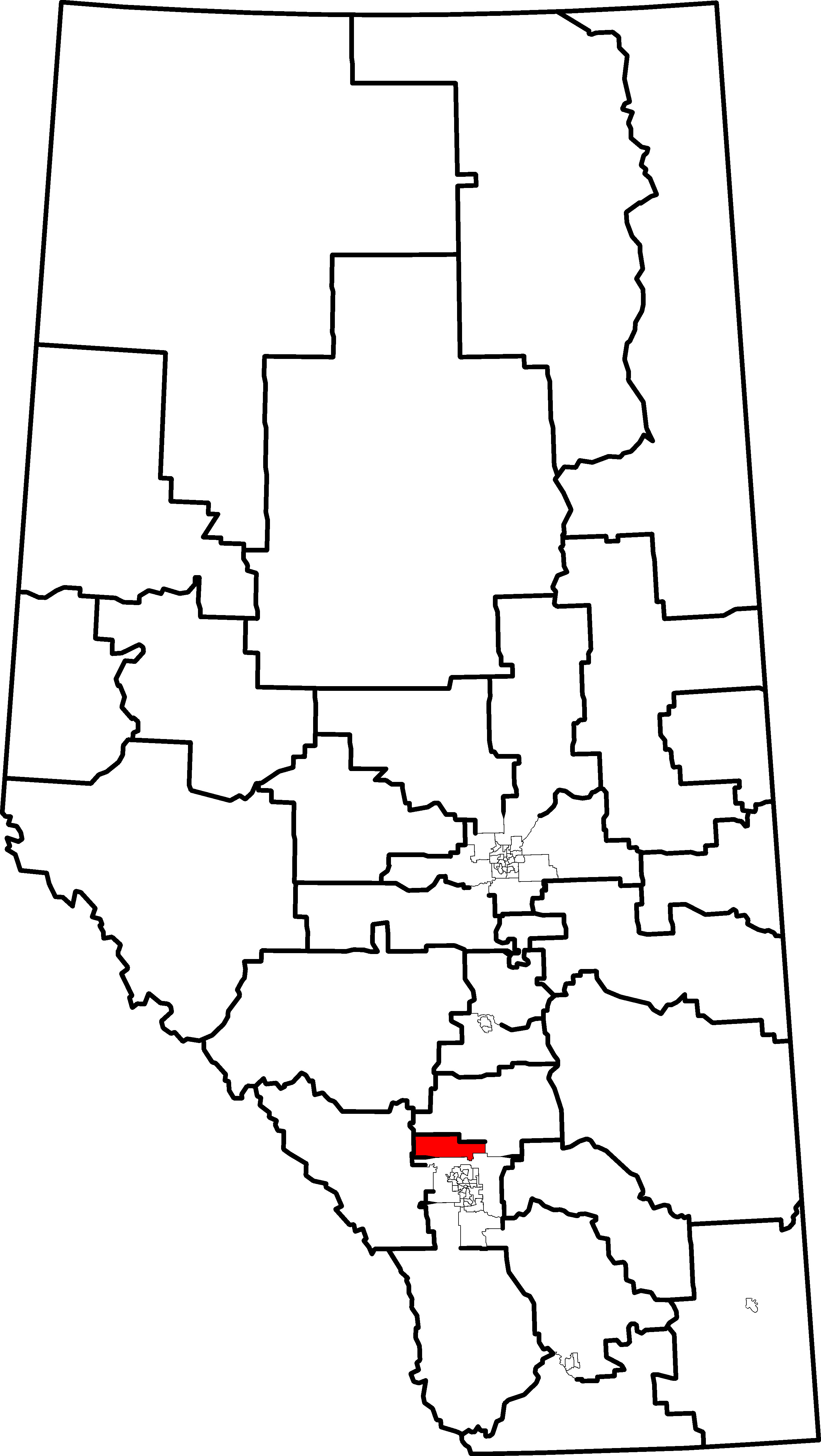
- 2010 boundaries

Defunct provincial electoral district
- Legislature: Legislative Assembly of Alberta
- District created: 2010
- District abolished: 2019
- First contested: 2012
- Last contested: 2015

Airdrie was a provincial electoral district in Alberta, Canada, mandated to return a single member to the Legislative Assembly of Alberta using the first-past-the-post method of voting from 2012 to 2019.

== History ==
The electoral district was created in the 2010 Alberta boundary re-distribution primarily from the abolished Airdrie-Chestermere electoral district, with a small portion west of the city of Airdrie from the abolished Foothills-Rocky View electoral district.

The Airdrie electoral district was dissolved in the 2017 electoral boundary re-distribution, and portions of the district would form the newly created Airdrie-Cochrane and Airdrie-East electoral districts.

=== Boundary history ===
47 Airdrie 2010 boundaries
Bordering districts
North	East	West	South
Olds-Didsbury-Three Hills	Olds-Didsbury-Three Hills	Banff-Cochrane	Chestermere-Rocky View
Riding map goes here			
Legal description from the Statutes of Alberta 2010, Electoral Divisions Act

=== Electoral history ===
Members of the Legislative Assembly for Airdrie
Assembly	Years	Member	Party
See Airdrie-Chestermere and Foothills-Rocky View 2004-2012
28th	2012–2014	Rob Anderson	Wildrose
28th	2014–2015	Rob Anderson	PC
29th	2015–2017	Angela Pitt	Wildrose
29th	2017–2019	Angela Pitt	UCP
See Airdrie-Cochrane and Airdrie-East 2019-

The electoral district was created in 2010. Incumbent Airdrie-Chestermere MLA Rob Anderson, who had been elected as a PC in 2008 but crossed the floor to Wildrose, was elected in Airdrie under the Wildrose banner in 2012. However, he subsequently crossed the floor back to the PCs.

Wildrose would re-gain the seat in 2015, sending Angela Pitt to the Legislative Assembly. Amongst the candidates Pitt defeated was PC candidate and Mayor of Airdrie Peter Brown. She would also cross the floor, joining the new United Conservative Party when the PCs and Wildrose decided to merge in 2017.

The riding was abolished when the 29th Legislature expired. Therefore, Airdrie has twice elected Wildrose MLAs, but neither served their full term with the party.

== Legislative election results ==
=== 2012 ===
2012 Alberta general election
Party	Candidate	Votes	%	±%
Wildrose	Rob Anderson	9,568	58.16%	–
Progressive Conservative	Kelly Hegg	5,376	32.68%	–
New Democratic	Bryan Young	685	4.16%	–
Liberal	Joel M. Steacy	525	3.19%	–
Independent	Jeff Willerton	297	1.81%	–
Total		16,451	–	–
Rejected, spoiled and declined		79	–	–
Eligible electors / turnout		31,258	52.88%	–
Wildrose pickup new district.				
Source(s) Sources: "Airdrie Official Results 2012 Alberta general election". officialresults.elections.ab.ca. Elections Alberta. The Report of the Chief Electoral Officer on the 2012 Provincial General Election for the Twenty-eighth Legislative Assembly (PDF). Elections Alberta. April 27, 2012. pp. 276–280.

=== 2015 ===
2015 Alberta general election
Party	Candidate	Votes	%	±%
Wildrose	Angela Pitt	7,499	35.08%	-23.08%
New Democratic	Chris Noble	6,388	29.88%	25.72%
Progressive Conservative	Peter Brown	6,181	28.91%	-3.77%
Alberta Party	Jeremy Klug	912	4.27%	–
Independent	Jeff Willerton	399	1.87%	0.06%
Total		21,379	–	–
Rejected, spoiled, and declined		103	–	–
Eligible electors / turnout		40,045	53.64%	0.76%
Wildrose hold		Swing		-10.14%
Source(s) Source: "Airdrie Official Results 2015 Alberta general election". officialresults.elections.ab.ca. Elections Alberta.

== Student vote results ==
=== 2012 ===
2012 Alberta student vote results
Affiliation	Candidate	Votes	%
Progressive Conservative	Kelly Hegg		%
Wildrose	Rob Anderson		
Liberal			%
New Democratic	Bryan Young		%
Total			100%

== See also ==
- List of Alberta provincial electoral districts
- Canadian provincial electoral districts
