= Rob Anderson (politician) =

Canadian politician

MLA for Airdrie-Chestermere
- In office March 3, 2008 – April 23, 2012
- Preceded by: Carol Haley
- Succeeded by: Electoral district abolished

MLA for Airdrie
- In office April 23, 2012 – May 5, 2015
- Preceded by: Electoral district created
- Succeeded by: Angela Pitt

Personal details
- Born: June 13, 1977 (age 49) Edmonton, Alberta, Canada
- Party: Progressive Conservative (2008–2010, 2014-2017); Wildrose Party (2010–2014)
- Education: Brigham Young University; University of Alberta
- Occupation: Lawyer
- Website: http://www.robanderson.ca

Robert Harmen Anderson (born June 13, 1977) is a Canadian politician and a former Member of the Legislative Assembly of Alberta; he represented the constituency of Airdrie. He was a Progressive Conservative until he crossed the floor on January 4, 2010 to join the Wildrose Party. He was reelected in the 2012 Alberta general election, with 16 other Wildrose MLAs to form the Official Opposition.

On December 17, 2014, Anderson resigned from the Wildrose caucus to cross the floor and rejoin the governing Progressive Conservative Association of Alberta caucus, along with eight other Wildrose MLAs.

He is currently acting as the Executive Director of the Office of the Premier, Danielle Smith.

== Political career ==
Anderson was elected to his first term in Alberta's Legislative Assembly as the Member for Airdrie-Chestermere in the 2008 provincial election.

During his first term, Anderson was appointed as a member of the Provincial Treasury Board and served on the standing and cabinet policy committees on Public Safety and Services as well as the Private Bills committee. He also served as the parliamentary assistant to the Solicitor General and Minister of Public Security.

As parliamentary assistant, Anderson oversaw stakeholder consultations toward developing Alberta's new law enforcement framework; conducted industry consultations for and sponsoring the Security Services and Investigators Act (2008); and sponsored the Alberta Gaming & Liquor Amendment Act (2009). He was also the writer and sponsor of a private members bill, the Election Finances and Contributions Disclosure (Third Party Advertising) Amendment Act (2009).

Anderson left the Progressive Conservative Party in January 2010 to join the Wildrose Alliance, which later changed its name to the Wildrose Party. When future leader Danielle Smith made it known she was leaving and when Anderson later joined the Wildrose Party, Smith named him deputy leader.

On April 23, 2012, Anderson was re-elected with 57% of the votes in Airdrie, essentially a redrawn version of his old riding. The Wildrose won 17 seats in that election, making Anderson Deputy Leader of the Opposition. Shortly after the election, he was appointed as House Leader and Finance Critic for the Official Opposition. He was also appointed as chair of the Standing Committee on Public Accounts, an all-party committee consisting of 18 Members of the Legislative Assembly that reviews the annual report of the Auditor General of Alberta and the public accounts of the province. He also served on the standing committees for Resource Stewardship and the Alberta Heritage Savings Trust Fund.

In response to the provincial government's 2013-2014 budget, Anderson and the Official Opposition authored and released the Wildrose Financial Recovery Plan, which claimed it would eliminate operating deficits restore a government surplus by 2014. In February 2013, Anderson, Drew Barnes and Danielle Smith released the Wildrose 10-year Debt Free Capital Plan. The plan called for $4 billion in capital infrastructure projects in 2013 and $48 billion over 10 years.

Anderson launched an online political commentary show called "Rob Anderson Unfiltered", though which he advocates for the assertion of Alberta's provincial rights within a united Canada, and other Alberta separatist far right beliefs.

In September 2021, Anderson worked with Barry Cooper and Derek From to produce the Free Alberta Strategy, a series of initiatives to make Alberta a sovereign jurisdiction. Anderson said the Free Alberta Strategy also calls for the end of any transferring of taxes from Alberta to Ottawa; which is not possible.

Anderson supported Danielle Smith as Campaign Chair in her 2022 run for United Conservative Party (UCP) leadership before becoming the Chair of her Transition Team, and then Executive Director of the Office of the Premier following her induction as premier.

== Early life ==
Anderson was born in Edmonton, the oldest of seven children. The family lived in Sherwood Park for most of Anderson's early years before moving in 1990 to Airdrie.

Anderson spent much of his time playing sports—particularly hockey and football. He won the Edmonton City Championship as defensive captain for the Salisbury High School football team in Sherwood Park, and was named the starting goaltender for the Brigham Young University Cougar's hockey team.

His mother, Jane Anderson, funded the legislation behind the Alberta Private Charter School Program in 1994 before opening her own (Footprints for Learning Charter Academy) in 2012 within Airdrie, Alberta. She continues to own multiple child development centres and private schools within alberta.

== Taiwan missionary service ==
When he was nineteen years old, Anderson spent two years living in Taiwan doing missionary service for the Church of Jesus Christ of Latter-day Saints, where he learned to speak Mandarin Chinese fluently, worked as a caregiver for high-needs individuals, and taught English as a second language.

== Education and awards ==
In 2003, Anderson graduated magna cum laude from Brigham Young University with a Bachelor of Arts in Communications.

Three years later, Anderson obtained a Bachelor of Laws degree from the University of Alberta, graduating with distinction.

Anderson co-founded the organization Students for a Stronger Alberta. This group advocated for democratic reform and more meaningful voter participation in the democratic process, printed a university newspaper (‘the Independent’) focused on debating relevant public policy and political issues of the day, and organized a speaker series on strengthening democracy that included Preston Manning, Ted Morton and David Kilgour.

== Business experience ==
Prior to his election as a Member of the Legislative Assembly, Anderson practiced corporate litigation law at Borden Ladner Gervais LLP in Calgary

Rob Anderson is was a partner at Warnock Kraft Anderson in Airdrie, Alberta, and head of the corporate litigation practice. He is currently Chief of Staff to Alberta premier, Danielle Smith.

During his time at law school, Anderson founded an online family entertainment business, selling it shortly before entering politics.

In 2021 he started the far-right YouTube channel Rob Anderson Unfiltered which receives American funding to discuss separatism.

== Election results ==
2008 Alberta general election results ( Airdrie-Chestermere )		Turnout 40.2%	
Affiliation	Candidate	Votes	%
Progressive Conservative	Rob Anderson	9,372	63%
Wildrose Alliance	Jeff Willerton	2,360	16%
Liberal	John Burke	1,972	13%
Green	David Brandreth	660	4%
NDP	Bryan Young	614	4%
Total		14978	100%

2012 Alberta general election: Airdrie
Party	Candidate	Votes	%	±%
Wildrose	Rob Anderson	9,568	58.16%	–
Progressive Conservative	Kelly Hegg	5,376	32.68%	–
New Democratic	Bryan Young	685	4.16%	–
Liberal	Joel M. Steacy	525	3.19%	–
Independent	Jeff Willerton	297	1.81%	–
Total		16,451	–	–
Rejected, spoiled and declined		79	–	–
Eligible electors / turnout		31,258	52.88%	–
Wildrose pickup new district.				
Source(s) Sources: "Airdrie Official Results 2012 Alberta general election". officialresults.elections.ab.ca. Elections Alberta. The Report of the Chief Electoral Officer on the 2012 Provincial General Election for the Twenty-eighth Legislative Assembly (PDF). Elections Alberta. 27 Apr 2012. pp. 276–280.

Political offices
Preceded by Carol Haley	MLA for Airdrie-Chestermere; 2008-12	Succeeded by District abolished
Preceded by District created	MLA for Airdrie; 2012-15	Succeeded by Angela Pitt
