= Bruce McAllister (politician) =

Canadian politician

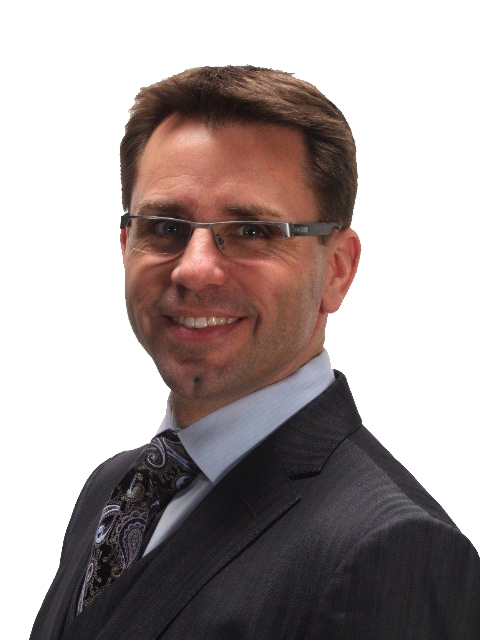

Member of the Legislative Assembly of Alberta for Chestermere-Rocky View
- In office April 23, 2012 – April 7, 2015
- Preceded by: District created
- Succeeded by: Leela Aheer

Personal details
- Born: March 27, 1971 (age 55) Fredericton, New Brunswick
- Profession: Communications Consultant & Strategist

Bruce H. McAllister (born March 27, 1971) is a Canadian politician who currently serves as the executive director of Alberta Premier Danielle Smith’s office. He was an elected member to the Legislative Assembly of Alberta representing the electoral district of Chestermere-Rocky View.

After the 2012 Alberta election, McAllister along with 16 other Wildrose MLAs formed the Official Opposition. Wildrose Leader Danielle Smith appointed McAllister as Education and Advanced Education Critic. He was defected to the Alberta Progressive Conservative along with nine Wildrose MLAs and was later defeated in the 2015 Alberta election.

== Broadcast career ==
After completing a diploma in broadcast journalism from Loyalist College in Belleville, Ontario, McAllister has had a career in broadcast journalism, working in cities including Halifax, Winnipeg, Medicine Hat, and Victoria. From 2004 to autumn 2011 (immediately prior to running in the 2012 provincial election) he was co-anchor of the morning news program on Global Calgary. After eight years of hosting the morning show he made the choice to leave Global Calgary to pursue a career in politics.

== Political career ==
McAllister became a Wildrose party member after just a month of looking for work. McAllister was avid critic of the long seated Alberta PC party and he was particularly effective in criticism of the PC governments lack of education reform. In the 2012 fall Legislative session as a member of the Wildrose party, McAllister brought forward amendments to the Education Act that would have ended school fees for mandatory curriculum activities, and would have guaranteed the rights of teachers to grade students with a zero where warranted.

On December 17, 2014, he was one of nine Wildrose MLAs who defected from the Wildrose party and crossed the floor to join the Alberta Progressive Conservative caucus. On December 18, 2014, the President of the Chestermere-Rocky View PC constituency association said that "...people in our constituency right now that are lost. They are dumbfounded..." By February however, McAllister was soon welcomed by PC Party leadership in Edmonton as one of their own even though local support remained questionable.

In March 2015, in the pre-writ period of that year's election, McAllister had two declared competitors for the riding of Chestermere-Rocky View. One was Jamie Lall, a long time PC party member and local resident, competing against McAllister for the PC nomination. The other was Leela Aheer, who was running as the Wildrose candidate. While some in the PC party continued to be critical of McAllister's decision to change parties without a democratic process, he remained confident in his decision; “Although I can’t speak for all of them, those people that wrote cheques and supported me as a Wildrose MLA, to the large degree, those same people will be writing cheques for me as a PC MLA".

In February 2015 several high profile PC party members including the Premier came to Chestermere with McAllister in campaign-style event that was geared to supporting the local PC party including McAllister. On March 23, 2015, McAllister voted in favour of the Tories' 2015–16 Alberta budget which contained the largest cumulative tax increase and the largest annual budget deficit in Alberta history. McAllister was defeated in the 2015 election by Wildrose candidate Leela Aheer.

=== Moderating incident ===
On September 29, 2025, McAllister served as moderator at Premier Danielle Smith’s Alberta Next panel. During the Q&A, when a high-school student in attendance began to ask a question about the Smith government's diversion of public funding to private schools, their microphone was cut. McAllister then openly berated the student for their tone, claimed the student wasn't making any sense, and said “Your parents should turn you over your knee”. Video showed McAllister was swiftly met with a negative reaction from the audience, who booed and jeered. One audience member in attendance called McAllister's remark "disgraceful". The student's censored query came just two days following a province-wide student walkout and "Save Alberta’s Education" rally protesting the province's education funding, recent controversial book ban, and transgender laws, which Premier Smith said she is willing to override Charter Rights to push through.

=== Nativism comments ===
On February 19, 2026, McAllister ranted in a social media post that he was disgusted with Canada’s immigration policies and that governments where importing " from nations with failed systems when our Judeo-Christian heritage and principles have worked so well here?’” Anna Triandafyllidou, an expert on immigration at Toronto Metropolitan University. pointed out "Canada was not just built by people from Western European or Anglo-Saxon descent" and that small towns in Alberta benefited to immigration such as Brooks. Christopher Worswick, an economics professor at Carleton University, took issues with McAllister’s emphasis on immigrants with Judeo-Christian values, saying that "it goes against Canadian values of treating everyone fairly and equally and not prioritizing one culture over another". Smith defended McAllister.

== Electoral history ==
2015 Alberta general election: Chestermere-Rocky View
Party	Candidate	Votes	%	±%
Wildrose	Leela Aheer	7,676	37.04%	-21.32%
Progressive Conservative	Bruce McAllister	7,454	35.97%	0.64%
New Democratic	William James Pelech	3,706	17.88%	14.80%
Independent	Jamie Lall	1,093	5.27%	–
Green	Coral Bliss Taylor	405	1.95%	–
Independent	Matt Grant	391	1.89%	–
Total		20,725	–	–
Rejected, spoiled and declined		91	–	–
Eligible electors / turnout		34,928	59.60%	4.38%
Wildrose hold		Swing		-10.98%
Source(s) Source: "54 - Chestermere-Rocky View Official Results 2015 Alberta general election". officialresults.elections.ab.ca. Elections Alberta.

2012 Alberta general election: Chestermere-Rocky View
Party	Candidate	Votes	%	±%
Wildrose	Bruce McAllister	10,165	58.36%	–
Progressive Conservative	Ted Morton	6,154	35.33%	–
Liberal	Sian Ramsden	564	3.24%	–
New Democratic	Nathan Salmon	536	3.08%	–
Total		17,419	–	–
Rejected, spoiled, and declined		59	–	–
Eligible electors / turnout		31,652	55.22%	–
Wildrose pickup new district.				
Source(s) Source: "54 - Chestermere-Rocky View Official Results 2012 Alberta general election". officialresults.elections.ab.ca. Elections Alberta.
