= Angela Pitt =

Canadian politician

Angela Pitt MLA
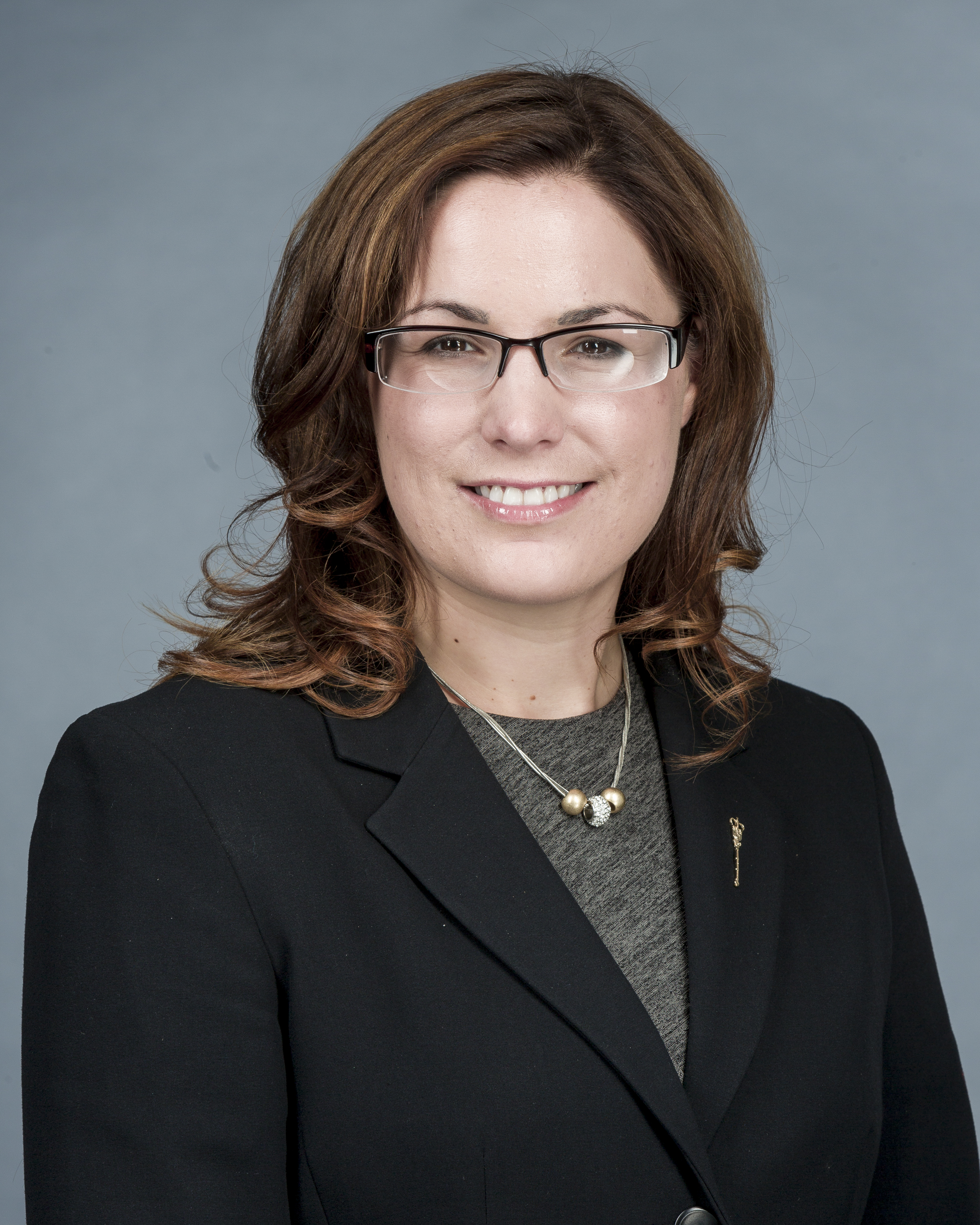

Member of the Legislative Assembly of Alberta
- Incumbent
- Assumed office May 5, 2015
- Preceded by: Rob Anderson
- Constituency: Airdrie (2015-19); Airdrie-East (2019-present)

Personal details
- Born: 1984 or 1985 (age 41–42) Airdrie, Alberta, Canada
- Party: United Conservative
- Other political affiliations: Wildrose (2015–17)
- Occupation: business owner

Angela Pitt (born 1984 or 1985) is a Canadian politician who was elected in the 2015 Alberta general election to the Legislative Assembly of Alberta representing the electoral district of Airdrie-East. She was elected under the banner of the Wildrose Party, which then merged with the Progressive Conservative Party to form the United Conservative Party (UCP) in July 2017. She serves as the UCP Deputy House Leader. On June 20, 2018, Angela Pitt won the UCP nomination for the riding of Airdrie-East with 71% of the vote, contested by sports broadcaster Roger Millions. April 16, 2019, Pitt was re-elected in the 2019 Alberta general election, representing the Airdrie-East riding under the United Conservative Party.

Angela Pitt supported Danielle Smith when she was running for leadership of the UCP.

Pitt has been part of various committees including the Special Standing Committee on Members’ Services, Standing Committee on Legislative Offices as well as Standing Committee on Families and Communities among others.

== Deputy Speaker and Chair of Committees ==
On May 21, 2019, Pitt was chosen by her peers to serve as Deputy Speaker and Chair of Committees in the 30th Alberta Legislature, an office she currently holds. She was re-elected to this role for the 31st Alberta Legislature on June 20, 2023.

== Personal life ==
Angela Pitt has two children. She holds a business administration diploma with a major in marketing from the Southern Alberta Institute of Technology (SAIT). Pitt was a small business owner and managed a special events company before her life in politics. She eventually sold her business to focus primarily on her political career.

== Political career ==
Pitt has advocated that the Airdrie area have better transportation infrastructure as she’s described how “We see [an] overpass at Balzac is becoming a growing concern. Of course, the completion of the 40th Avenue interchange will alleviate so many pressures for the people of Airdrie and the surrounding area in the coming future”.

Pitt had been a vocal critic of the United Conservative Party government response to COVID-19, joining 16 other members of the legislature in a letter denouncing COVID-19 restrictions in April 2021, and joined the "End the Lockdowns" national caucus of elected officials. In a video conference for the "Free Alberta Strategy" on September 28, 2021, Pitt stated she had "no confidence" in Premier Jason Kenney, the statement came from growing dissatisfaction with the provincial government's response to COVID-19. Kenney ultimately stepped down as Premier after 51.4 percent approval in the UCP leadership review.

Pitt's association with the Wildrose Party in the Airdrie community resulted in the claim that she may have been responsible for transferring $16,000 from the Wildrose Party constituency association to a political action committee referred to as the Alberta Fund. This issue was resolved after Pitt revealed that one of the people who brought this claim against her was her opponent's campaign manager and Elections Alberta verified that transferring funds from constituency associations to a registered third party is not against the law.

On November 3, 2025, a petition to recall Pitt was approved.

== Electoral history ==
=== 2023 general election ===
2023 Alberta general election: Airdrie-East
Party	Candidate	Votes	%	±%
United Conservative	Angela Pitt	15,215	62.01	-5.31
New Democratic	Dan Nelles	8,697	35.45	+15.53
Green	Michael Jacobsen	623	2.54	–
Total		24,535	99.38	–
Rejected and declined		153	0.62	
Turnout		24,688	61.84	
Eligible voters		39,924		
United Conservative hold		Swing		-10.42
Source(s) Source: Elections Alberta

=== 2019 general election ===
2019 Alberta general election: Airdrie-East
Party	Candidate	Votes	%	±%	Expenditures
United Conservative	Angela Pitt	16,764	67.32	-0.37	$62,714
New Democratic	Roxie Baez Zamora	4,960	19.92	-9.63	$13,180
Alberta Party	Alex Luterbach	2,371	9.52	–	$4,646
Freedom Conservative	Rick Northey	482	1.94	–	$1,511
Alberta Independence	Jeff Olson	213	0.86	–	$1,655
Independent	Richard Absalom D. Herdman	112	0.45	–	$500
Total		24,902	–	–	
Rejected, spoiled and declined		168	33	6	
Eligible electors / turnout		35,729	70.18	–	
United Conservative pickup new district.					
Source(s) Source: Elections Alberta; Note: Expenses is the sum of "Election Expenses", "Other Expenses" and "Transfers Issued". The Elections Act limits "Election Expenses" to $50,000.

=== 2015 general election ===
2015 Alberta general election: Airdrie
Party	Candidate	Votes	%	±%
Wildrose	Angela Pitt	7,499	35.08%	-23.08%
New Democratic	Chris Noble	6,388	29.88%	25.72%
Progressive Conservative	Peter Brown	6,181	28.91%	-3.77%
Alberta Party	Jeremy Klug	912	4.27%	–
Independent	Jeff Willerton	399	1.87%	0.06%
Total		21,379	–	–
Rejected, spoiled, and declined		103	–	–
Eligible electors / turnout		40,045	53.64%	0.76%
Wildrose hold		Swing		-10.14%
Source(s) Source: "Airdrie Official Results 2015 Alberta general election". officialresults.elections.ab.ca. Elections Alberta.

Political offices
Preceded by Rob Anderson	MLA for Airdrie; 2015-present	Succeeded by Incumbent
