= Airdrie-Cochrane (provincial electoral district) =

Provincial electoral district in Alberta, Canada

Alberta electoral district
- Airdrie-Cochrane within the Calgary Metropolitan Region (2017 boundaries).

Provincial electoral district
- Legislature: Legislative Assembly of Alberta
MLA
Peter Guthrie
Progressive Tory
- District created: 2017
- First contested: 2019
- Last contested: 2023

Demographics
- Population (2016): 51,170
- Area (km²): 754
- Pop. density (per km²): 67.9
- Census division: 6
- Census subdivision(s): Airdrie, Cochrane

Airdrie-Cochrane is a provincial electoral district in Alberta, Canada. The district is one of 87 districts mandated to return a single member (MLA) to the Legislative Assembly of Alberta using the first past the post method of voting. It was contested for the first time in the 2019 Alberta election.

== Geography ==
The district is located northwest of Calgary, containing the town of Cochrane, the part of Airdrie west of 8 St SW and south of 1 Ave NW, and the rural area lying between the two communities. It borders Calgary's northern edge between the Bow River and Highway 2.

== History ==
Members for Airdrie-Cochrane
Assembly	Years	Member	Party
See Airdrie 2012-2019 and Banff-Cochrane 1979-2019
30th	2019–2023	Peter Guthrie	United Conservative
31st	2023–2025	Peter Guthrie	United Conservative
31st	2025–2025	Peter Guthrie	Independent
31st	2025–2025	Peter Guthrie	Alberta Party
31st	2025–present	Peter Guthrie	Progressive Tory

The district was created in 2017 when the Electoral Boundaries Commission recommended abolishing the three districts of Airdrie, Banff-Cochrane and Chestermere-Rocky View, completely reorganizing the ridings surrounding Calgary to reflect the rapid growth in the area, and creating Airdrie-Cochrane from parts of each. In 2017, the Airdrie-Cochrane electoral district had a population of 51,170, which was 9 per cent above the provincial average of 46,803 for a provincial electoral district.

In the 2019 Alberta general election, United Conservative Party candidate Peter Guthrie was elected with 66 per cent of the vote, defeating New Democratic Party candidate Steve Durrell with 25 per cent of the vote, and three other candidates.

== Electoral results ==
=== 2023 ===
2023 Alberta general election
Party	Candidate	Votes	%	±%
United Conservative	Peter Guthrie	18,074	60.10	-5.89
New Democratic	Shaun Fluker	11,223	37.32	+12.08
Green	Michelle Overwater Giles	393	1.31	–
Solidarity Movement	Michael Andrusco	199	0.66	–
Wildrose Loyalty Coalition	Ron Voss	183	0.61	–
Total		30,072	99.30	–
Rejected and declined		213	0.70	
Turnout		30,285	66.37	
Eligible voters		45,633		
United Conservative hold		Swing		-8.98
Source(s) Source: Elections Alberta

=== 2019 ===
2019 Alberta general election
Party	Candidate	Votes	%	±%	Expenditures
United Conservative	Peter Guthrie	18,777	65.99%	-1.70%	$57,030
New Democratic	Steve Durrell	7,183	25.24%	-4.34%	$12,497
Alberta Party	Vern Raincock	1,818	6.39%	–	$785
Alberta Independence	Danielle Cameron	345	1.21%	–	$1,640
Freedom Conservative	Matthew Joseph Morrisey	331	1.16%	–	$2,025
Total		28,454	–	–	
Rejected, spoiled and declined		87	62	13	
Eligible electors / turnout		38,568	74.04%	–	
United Conservative pickup new district.					
Source(s) Source: Elections Alberta; Note: Expenses is the sum of "Election Expenses", "Other Expenses" and "Transfers Issued". The Elections Act limits "Election Expenses" to $50,000.

=== 2015 ===
Redistributed results, 2015 Alberta election
Wildrose	7,044	36.54%
Progressive Conservative	6,006	31.15%
New Democratic	5,703	29.58%
Others	527	2.73%

== See also ==
- List of Alberta provincial electoral districts
- Canadian provincial electoral districts
