= Joseph Schow =

Canadian politician

The Honourable Joseph Schow ECA MLA

Minister of Jobs, Economy, Trade and Immigration
- Incumbent
- Assumed office May 16, 2025
- Premier: Danielle Smith
- Preceded by: Matt Jones

Minister of Tourism and Sport
- In office June 9, 2023 – May 16, 2025
- Premier: Danielle Smith
- Preceded by: Todd Loewen
- Succeeded by: Andrew Boitchenko

Member of the Legislative Assembly of Alberta for Cardston-Siksika
- Incumbent
- Assumed office April 16, 2019

Personal details
- Party: United Conservative Party
- Education: Dalhousie University George Washington University

Joseph Schow ECA MLA is a Canadian politician who was elected in the 2019 Alberta general election to represent the electoral district of Cardston-Siksika in the 30th Alberta Legislature. He is a member of the United Conservative Party, and he has been serving as Government House Leader since October 24, 2022. On June 9, 2023, Schow was appointed Minister of Tourism and Sport, and on May 16, 2025 he was shuffled to Minister of Jobs, Economy, Trade and Immigration.

== Biography ==
Schow received his bachelor of arts degree in Russian from Dalhousie University and his master's degree from George Washington University. He was appointed House Leader (Minister Without Portfolio) on October 24, 2022. He previously served as Deputy Whip.

As of March 2023, Schow was on the Government Legislative Review Committee.

As the Chair of the Democratic Accountability Committee, Schow played a role in drafting and supporting the Recall Act, which allows Albertans to recall municipal representatives and trustees. He spoke to the importance of legislation increasing accountability but not encouraging frivolous recall petitions and elections.

Though Schow supported Travis Toews in the 2022 UCP leadership election, he voiced his support for Premier Danielle Smith’s priorities of the affordability crisis and asserting challenges to the federal government’s jurisdictional authority.

Schow was the sponsor of Government Bill 7: The Miscellaneous Statutes Amendment Act, 2022 (No.2), which received royal assent on December 15, 2022.

Since June 9, 2023, Schow has been the Minister of Tourism and Sport.

== Electoral history ==
=== 2023 general election ===
2023 Alberta general election: Cardston-Siksika
Party	Candidate	Votes	%	±%
United Conservative	Joseph Schow	10,550	74.12	+0.57
New Democratic	Colleen Quintal	2,527	17.75	+1.75
Independent	Angela Tabak	871	6.12	–
Alberta Independence	Terry Wolsey	251	1.76	–
Solidarity Movement	Pär Wantenaar	35	0.25	–
Total		14,234	99.55	–
Rejected and declined		64	0.45	
Turnout		14,298	55.10	
Eligible voters		25,951		
United Conservative hold		Swing		-0.59
Source(s) Source: Elections Alberta

=== 2019 general election ===
2019 Alberta general election: Cardston-Siksika
Party	Candidate	Votes	%	±%
United Conservative	Joseph Schow	11,980	73.55	1.01
New Democratic	Kirby Smith	2,606	16.00	-7.49
Independent	Ian A. Donovan	727	4.46	–
Alberta Party	Casey Douglass	589	3.62	–
Freedom Conservative	Jerry Gautreau	214	1.31	–
Liberal	Cathleen McFarland	173	1.06	–
Total		16,289	–	–
Rejected, spoiled and declined		23	62	8
Eligible electors / turnout		25,050	65.15%	–
United Conservative pickup new district.				
Source(s) Source: "54 - Cardston-Siksika, 2019 Alberta general election". officialresults.elections.ab.ca. Elections Alberta. Alberta. Chief Electoral Officer (2019). 2019 General Election. A Report of the Chief Electoral Officer. Volume II (PDF) (Report). Vol. 2. Edmonton, Alta.: Elections Alberta. pp. 232–236. ISBN 978-1-988620-12-1.
