= Court Ellingson =

Canadian politician from Alberta

Court Ellingson MLA

Member of the Legislative Assembly of Alberta for Calgary-Foothills
- Incumbent
- Assumed office May 29, 2023
- Preceded by: Jason Luan

Personal details
- Born: July 1970 (age 56) Victoria, British Columbia, Canada
- Party: Alberta NDP
- Education: University of Calgary
- Occupation: Consultant

Court Ellingson (born July 1970) is a Canadian politician from the Alberta New Democratic Party who was elected as a Member of the Legislative Assembly of Alberta for Calgary-Foothills in the 2023 Alberta general election. As of September 24, 2024, he serves as the Official Opposition critic for the Treasury Board & Finance. On March 10, 2026, he was appointed as one of two NDP MLA's, alongside Alberta NDP Deputy Leader Rakhi Pancholi, on the Select Special Citizen Initiative Proposal Review Committee. He was born in Victoria, British Columbia in 1970.

Alongside Brooks Arcand-Paul and Janis Irwin, he is one of three out LGBT members of the current Alberta legislature.

== Electoral history ==
2023 Alberta general election: Calgary-Foothills
| Party | Candidate | Votes | % | ±% |
|---|---|---|---|---|
| New Democratic | Court Ellingson | 11,054 | 49.92 | +17.50 |
| United Conservative | Jason Luan | 10,793 | 48.74 | -8.24 |
| Independent | Keenan Demontigny | 190 | 0.86 | – |
| Solidarity Movement | Kami Dass | 105 | 0.47 | – |
| Total | | 22,142 | 99.27 | – |
| Rejected and declined | | 162 | 0.73 | |
| Turnout | | 22,304 | 61.95 | |
| Eligible voters | | 36,006 | | |
| New Democratic gain from United Conservative | | Swing | | +12.87 |
Source(s) Source: Elections Alberta
