= Cardston-Siksika =

Provincial electoral district in Alberta, Canada

Alberta electoral district
- Cardston-Siksika within Alberta (2017 boundaries).

Provincial electoral district
- Legislature: Legislative Assembly of Alberta
MLA
Joseph Schow
United Conservative
- District created: 2017
- First contested: 2019
- Last contested: 2023

Demographics
- Population (2016): 42,655
- Area (km²): 15,773
- Pop. density (per km²): 2.7
- Census division(s): 2, 3, 5

Cardston-Siksika is a provincial electoral district in Alberta, Canada. The district was one of 87 districts mandated to return a single member (MLA) to the Legislative Assembly of Alberta using the first past the post method of voting. It was contested for the first time in the 2019 Alberta election.

== Geography ==
The district is located in southern Alberta, stretching from Namaka (east of Calgary) to the border with Montana. It contains all of Vulcan County, the northern portions of Lethbridge County and MD of Taber which includes Vauxhall and Hays, and all of Cardston County, as well as the Treaty 7 reserves of the Kainai and Siksika nations.

== History ==
Members for Cardston-Siksika
Assembly	Years	Member	Party
See Little Bow 1913–2019 and Cardston- Taber-Warner 1997–2019
30th	2019–2023	Joseph Schow	United Conservative
31st	2023–	Joseph Schow	United Conservative

The district was created in 2017 when the Electoral Boundaries Commission recommended reducing the number of districts in southern Alberta due to relatively slow population growth. The creation of "Cardston/Siksika", was the final boundary change for the new riding. The first suggestion of the Boundary Commission was the "Taber/Vulcan" riding which extended from north of Vulcan to the Canada/U.S border, east to the Alberta/Saskatchewan border, north to Medicine Hat and west to the Bow River. Little Bow MLA Dave Schneider presented at all Boundary Commission meetings that Taber/Vulcan was much too large. The final review resulted in a change of the boundaries of the proposed riding to the present "Cardston/Siksika" riding.

== Electoral results ==
=== 2023 ===
2023 Alberta general election
Party	Candidate	Votes	%	±%
United Conservative	Joseph Schow	10,550	74.12	+0.57
New Democratic	Colleen Quintal	2,527	17.75	+1.75
Independent	Angela Tabak	871	6.12	–
Alberta Independence	Terry Wolsey	251	1.76	–
Solidarity Movement	Pär Wantenaar	35	0.25	–
Total		14,234	99.55	–
Rejected and declined		64	0.45	
Turnout		14,298	55.10	
Eligible voters		25,951		
United Conservative hold		Swing		-0.59
Source(s) Source: Elections Alberta

=== 2019 ===
2019 Alberta general election
Party	Candidate	Votes	%	±%
United Conservative	Joseph Schow	11,980	73.55	1.01
New Democratic	Kirby Smith	2,606	16.00	-7.49
Independent	Ian A. Donovan	727	4.46	–
Alberta Party	Casey Douglass	589	3.62	–
Freedom Conservative	Jerry Gautreau	214	1.31	–
Liberal	Cathleen McFarland	173	1.06	–
Total		16,289	–	–
Rejected, spoiled and declined		23	62	8
Eligible electors / turnout		25,050	65.15%	–
United Conservative pickup new district.				
Source(s) Source: "54 - Cardston-Siksika, 2019 Alberta general election". officialresults.elections.ab.ca. Elections Alberta. Alberta. Chief Electoral Officer (2019). 2019 General Election. A Report of the Chief Electoral Officer. Volume II (PDF) (Report). Vol. 2. Edmonton, Alta.: Elections Alberta. pp. 232–236. ISBN 978-1-988620-12-1.

=== 2015 ===
Redistributed results, 2015 Alberta election
Wildrose	5,440	39.55
Progressive Conservative	4,538	32.99
New Democratic	3,231	23.49
Others	545	3.96

== See also ==
- List of Alberta provincial electoral districts
- Canadian provincial electoral districts
