= Muhammad Yaseen =

Canadian politician

The Honourable Muhammad Yaseen ECA MLA

Minister of Immigration and Multiculturalism
- Incumbent
- Assumed office June 9, 2023
- Premier: Danielle Smith
- Preceded by: Rajan Sawhney

Associate Minister of Immigration and Multiculturalism
- In office July 8, 2021 – June 9, 2023
- Premier: Jason Kenney, Danielle Smith

Member of the Legislative Assembly of Alberta for Calgary-North
- Incumbent
- Assumed office April 16, 2019

Personal details
- Party: United Conservative Party
- Education: University of Wyoming; University of Calgary; University of Phoenix

Muhammad Yaseen ECA MLA is a Canadian politician who was elected in the 2019 Alberta general election to represent the northwest Calgary electoral district of Calgary-North in the 30th Alberta Legislature. He was appointed Parliamentary Secretary for Community Outreach on October 24, 2022. Previously, he was appointed Associate Minister of Immigration and Multiculturalism on July 8, 2021. Prior to this, Yaseen was appointed Parliamentary Secretary of Immigration on April 30, 2019. He has served as a member of the Standing Committees on Resource Stewardship, Legislative Offices and the Alberta Heritage Savings Trust Fund. Additionally, he is co-chair of the Caucus Outreach Committee.

Prior to serving with the Legislative Assembly, Yaseen worked his entire professional career in the oil industry. He began his career in 1979 in Rimbey, Alberta and retired after 40 years of service with Imperial Oil, which is majority-owned by ExxonMobil. An engineer by profession, he is experienced in reservoir/joint ventures engineering, and has held various advisory roles in processing, transportation, contracts and projects.

He holds a bachelor of science degree in petroleum engineering from the University of Wyoming, a master's degree in civil engineering from the University of Calgary and a master's of business administration from the University of Phoenix. He is a professional engineer and is a member of APEGA, the Association of Professional Engineers and Geoscientists of Alberta.

Yaseen has been an active member of the Calgary community since the 1970s, volunteering with the Canadian Red Cross and the Pakistan Canada Association for many years. He has also contributed his time to Junior Achievement, the United Way, the Mustard Seed, MOSAIC Volunteers and the Calgary Food Bank.

Yaseen was awarded the Queen Elizabeth II Diamond Jubilee Medal in November 2012 by then Lieutenant Governor of Alberta, the Honourable Donald S. Ethell.

A recall petition against Yaseen was approved by Elections Alberta on November 14, 2025. Signature collection runs from November 25, 2025 to February 22, 2026, requiring 9,503 signatures.

== Electoral history ==
2023 Alberta general election: Calgary-North
Party	Candidate	Votes	%	±%
United Conservative	Muhammad Yaseen	7,927	50.41	-4.82
New Democratic	Rajesh Angral	7,798	49.59	+18.51
Total		15,725	99.28	–
Rejected and declined		114	0.72	
Turnout		15,839	56.81	
Eligible electors		27,882		
United Conservative hold		Swing		-11.67
Source(s) Source: Elections Alberta

2019 Alberta general election: Calgary-North
Party	Candidate	Votes	%	±%
United Conservative	Muhammad Yaseen	8,409	55.2	-1.1
New Democratic	Kelly Mandryk	4,731	31.1	-6.6
Alberta Party	Gary Arora	1,591	10.5	N/A
Liberal	Salma Hag	365	2.4	-3.4
Alberta Independence	Brad Hopkins	128	0.8	N/A
Total valid votes		15,224		
Rejected, spoiled, and declined				
Registered electors		25,331		
Turnout		60.1		
