= Airdrie-East =

Provincial electoral district in Alberta, Canada

Alberta electoral district
- Airdrie-East within the Calgary Metropolitan Region (2017 boundaries).

Provincial electoral district
- Legislature: Legislative Assembly of Alberta
MLA
Angela Pitt
United Conservative
- District created: 2017
- First contested: 2019
- Last contested: 2023

Demographics
- Population (2016): 49,978
- Area (km²): 714
- Pop. density (per km²): 70
- Census division(s): 6
- Census subdivision(s): Airdrie, Rocky View, Wheatland

Airdrie-East is a provincial electoral district in Alberta, Canada. The district is one of 87 districts mandated to return a single member (MLA) to the Legislative Assembly of Alberta using the first past the post method of voting. It was contested for the first time in the 2019 Alberta election.

== Geography ==
The district is located northeast of Calgary, containing most of Airdrie, except the area west of 8 St SW and south of 1 Ave NW. It stretches west past Keoma to RR253.

== History ==
Members for Airdrie-East
Assembly	Years	Member	Party
See Airdrie and Chestermere-Rocky View 2012-2019
30th	2019–2023	Angela Pitt	United Conservative
31st	2023–present	Angela Pitt	United Conservative

The district was created in 2017 when the Electoral Boundaries Commission recommended abolishing Airdrie and Chestermere-Rocky View, completely reorganizing the ridings surrounding Calgary to reflect the rapid growth in the area. In 2017, the Airdrie-East electoral district had a population of 49,978, which was 7 per cent above the provincial average of 46,803 for a provincial electoral district.

In the 2019 Alberta general election, United Conservative Party candidate and incumbent from the former Airdrie electoral district, Angela Pitt was elected with 67 per cent of the vote, defeating New Democratic Party candidate Roxie Baez Zamora with 20 per cent of the vote, and four candidates.

In the 2023 Alberta general election, Angela Pitt was re-elected on a reduced majority.

== Electoral results ==
=== 2023 ===
2023 Alberta general election
Party	Candidate	Votes	%	±%
United Conservative	Angela Pitt	15,215	62.01	-5.31
New Democratic	Dan Nelles	8,697	35.45	+15.53
Green	Michael Jacobsen	623	2.54	–
Total		24,535	99.38	–
Rejected and declined		153	0.62	
Turnout		24,688	61.84	
Eligible voters		39,924		
United Conservative hold		Swing		-10.42
Source(s) Source: Elections Alberta

=== 2019 ===
2019 Alberta general election
Party	Candidate	Votes	%	±%	Expenditures
United Conservative	Angela Pitt	16,764	67.32	-0.37	$62,714
New Democratic	Roxie Baez Zamora	4,960	19.92	-9.63	$13,180
Alberta Party	Alex Luterbach	2,371	9.52	–	$4,646
Freedom Conservative	Rick Northey	482	1.94	–	$1,511
Alberta Independence	Jeff Olson	213	0.86	–	$1,655
Independent	Richard Absalom D. Herdman	112	0.45	–	$500
Total		24,902	–	–	
Rejected, spoiled and declined		168	33	6	
Eligible electors / turnout		35,729	70.18	–	
United Conservative pickup new district.					
Source(s) Source: Elections Alberta; Note: Expenses is the sum of "Election Expenses", "Other Expenses" and "Transfers Issued". The Elections Act limits "Election Expenses" to $50,000.

=== 2015 ===
Redistributed results, 2015 Alberta general election
Wildrose	7,044	36.54%
Progressive Conservative	6,006	31.15%
New Democratic	5,703	29.58%
Others	527	2.73%

== See also ==
- List of Alberta provincial electoral districts
- Canadian provincial electoral districts
