= Martin Long (politician) =

Canadian politician

The Honourable Martin Long ECA MLA

Alberta Minister of Infrastructure
- Incumbent
- Assumed office February 27, 2025
- Preceded by: Peter Guthrie

Member of the Legislative Assembly of Alberta West Yellowhead
- Incumbent
- Assumed office April 16, 2019
- Preceded by: Eric Rosendahl

Personal details
- Born: August 4, 1977 (age 48) Liverpool, Nova Scotia, Canada
- Party: United Conservative Party
- Occupation: Pulp and paper mill operator

Martin Long is a Canadian politician who was elected in the 2019 Alberta general election to the Legislative Assembly of Alberta representing the electoral district of West Yellowhead as a member of the United Conservative Party.

== Political career ==
As a legislator, Long has been a member of the Standing Committee on Families and Communities. In addition to this, Mr. Long participated in the Alberta Joint Working Group on MMIWG (Murdered and Missing Indigenous Women and Girls) which resulted in the 113 Pathways to Justice Report.

In his elected position, responsible resource development has been a focus. He chairs the Upper-Smoky Caribou Sub-Regional Task Force and advocates both industry and conservation in his constituency; most notably in relation to the Mountain Pine Beetle, for the elimination of which he submitted the non-government Motion 505 on 24 June 2019. Motion 505 was carried the same day. Four days later a CBC article said that 14% of Jasper National Park had been infested to date.

Long was appointed as the Parliamentary Secretary for Small Business on October 24, 2022, and formerly served as the Parliamentary Secretary for Small Business and Tourism.

Long was appointed as the Minister of Infrastructure after former Minister Peter Guthrie resigned. Long was appointed as the new Minister on February 27, 2025.

== Volunteer activities ==
Long’s volunteer involvement includes Chairing Tennille's Hope Community Kitchen board of directors for the duration of the year 2019.

== Electoral history ==
=== 2023 general election ===
2023 Alberta general election: West Yellowhead
Party	Candidate	Votes	%	±%
United Conservative	Martin Long	14,456	71.80	+3.48
New Democratic	Fred Kreiner	5,679	28.20	+7.72
Total		20,135	99.23	–
Rejected and declined		156	0.77	
Turnout		20,291	55.37	
Eligible voters		36,648		
United Conservative hold		Swing		-2.12
Source(s) Source: Elections Alberta

=== 2019 general election ===
2019 Alberta general election: West Yellowhead
Party	Candidate	Votes	%	±%
United Conservative	Martin Long	16,381	68.31%	7.23%
New Democratic	Paula Cackett	4,912	20.48%	-18.44%
Alberta Party	Kristie Gomuwka	2,073	8.65%	–
Alberta Advantage	Paul Lupyczuk	261	1.09%	–
Alberta Independence	Travis Poirier	229	0.96%	–
Independent	David Pearce	123	0.51%	–
Total		23,979	–	–
Rejected, spoiled and declined		111	50	9
Eligible electors / turnout		35,546	67.80%	21.51%
United Conservative gain from New Democratic		Swing		20.61%
Source(s) Source: "87 - West Yellowhead, 2019 Alberta general election". officialresults.elections.ab.ca. Elections Alberta. Alberta. Chief Electoral Officer (2019). 2019 General Election. A Report of the Chief Electoral Officer. Volume II (PDF) (Report). Vol. 2. Edmonton, Alta.: Elections Alberta. pp. 427–433. ISBN 978-1-988620-12-1.
