= Peter Guthrie (politician) =

Canadian politician

The Honourable Peter Guthrie ECA MLA
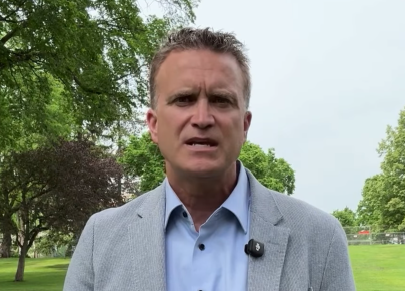
- Guthrie in 2026

Leader of the Progressive Tory Party (Note: Formerly known as the Alberta Party)
- Incumbent
- Assumed office December 9, 2025
- Preceded by: Lindsay Amantea (interim)

Minister of Infrastructure
- In office June 9, 2023 – February 25, 2025
- Premier: Danielle Smith
- Preceded by: Nathan Neudorf
- Succeeded by: Martin Long

Minister of Energy
- In office October 24, 2022 – June 9, 2023
- Premier: Danielle Smith
- Preceded by: Sonya Savage
- Succeeded by: Brian Jean

Member of the Legislative Assembly of Alberta for Airdrie-Cochrane
- Incumbent
- Assumed office April 16, 2019
- Preceded by: Riding established

Personal details
- Born: 1968 or 1969 (age 57–58) Brockville, Ontario, Canada
- Party: Progressive Tory (since Jul 2025) (Note: Known as the Alberta Party until December 2025)
- Other political affiliations: UCP (until Apr 2025); Independent (Apr–Jul 2025)

Peter Guthrie ECA MLA (born 1968/1969), is a Canadian politician who is the leader of the Progressive Tory Party, and has served as a member of the Legislative Assembly of Alberta (MLA) representing the electoral district of Airdrie-Cochrane since 2019. A member of the United Conservative Party (UCP) until April 2025, he previously served as Minister of Energy and Minerals from 2022 to 2023 and Minister of Infrastructure from 2023 to 2025.

== Early life and career ==
Guthrie was born in Brockville, Ontario, but has spent most of his life in Alberta. He has owned and operated two businesses: Dumaresq Brothers Ranch in Consort, Alberta, and a Mr. Lube franchise in Calgary.

== Political career ==
Guthrie was elected as a United Conservative Party MLA in the 2019 Alberta general election. On October 24, 2022, Premier Danielle Smith appointed him as Minister of Energy and Minerals, and he was also named to the Treasury Board.

As Minister of Energy and Minerals, Guthrie issued a ministerial order requiring the Alberta Energy Regulator to ensure that oil and gas companies paid outstanding municipal taxes before approving new licences or licence transfers. Under this order, companies had to confirm that their unpaid municipal taxes did not exceed the allowable threshold or that they had a repayment plan in place before applying for new licences or asset transfers.

In 2023, Guthrie was reassigned as Minister of Infrastructure. He held this position until February 25, 2025, when he resigned, citing concerns over the government's procurement practices. Guthrie was removed from the UCP caucus in April 2025 after he criticized his party's handling of an investigation into allegations of corruption involving health contracts.

In July 2025, along with Scott Sinclair, Guthrie announced plans to form a new political party in the name of the Progressive Conservatives. Later that month, it was announced that Guthrie and Sinclair would be joining the Alberta Party and rebranding it as the Progressive Conservative Party. However, Sinclair did not end up doing so and returned to the UCP caucus in May 2026.

On December 9, 2025, Guthrie became the leader of the Alberta Party. The party changed its name to the Progressive Tory Party of Alberta on December 18, 2025.

== Personal life ==
Guthrie lives in Cochrane, Alberta, with his wife and two children.

== Electoral history ==
=== 2023 general election ===
2023 Alberta general election: Airdrie-Cochrane
Party	Candidate	Votes	%	±%
United Conservative	Peter Guthrie	18,074	60.10	-5.89
New Democratic	Shaun Fluker	11,223	37.32	+12.08
Green	Michelle Overwater Giles	393	1.31	–
Solidarity Movement	Michael Andrusco	199	0.66	–
Wildrose Loyalty Coalition	Ron Voss	183	0.61	–
Total		30,072	99.30	–
Rejected and declined		213	0.70	
Turnout		30,285	66.37	
Eligible voters		45,633		
United Conservative hold		Swing		-8.98
Source(s) Source: Elections Alberta

=== 2019 general election ===
2019 Alberta general election: Airdrie-Cochrane
Party	Candidate	Votes	%	±%	Expenditures
United Conservative	Peter Guthrie	18,777	65.99%	-1.70%	$57,030
New Democratic	Steve Durrell	7,183	25.24%	-4.34%	$12,497
Alberta Party	Vern Raincock	1,818	6.39%	–	$785
Alberta Independence	Danielle Cameron	345	1.21%	–	$1,640
Freedom Conservative	Matthew Joseph Morrisey	331	1.16%	–	$2,025
Total		28,454	–	–	
Rejected, spoiled and declined		87	62	13	
Eligible electors / turnout		38,568	74.04%	–	
United Conservative pickup new district.					
Source(s) Source: Elections Alberta; Note: Expenses is the sum of "Election Expenses", "Other Expenses" and "Transfers Issued". The Elections Act limits "Election Expenses" to $50,000.
