= Legislative Assembly of Alberta =

Provincial legislature of Alberta

- 31st Alberta Legislature

Type
- Type: Unicameral house of the Alberta Legislature

History
- Founded: September 9, 1905
- Preceded by: North-West Legislative Assembly

Leadership
- Speaker: Ric McIver, UCP since May 13, 2025
- Premier: Danielle Smith, UCP since October 11, 2022
- Government House Leader: Joseph Schow, UCP since October 24, 2022
- Opposition Leader: Naheed Nenshi, NDP since July 12, 2025
- Opposition House Leader: Christina Gray, NDP since February 8, 2021

Structure
- Seats: 87
- Political groups: Government (46): United Conservative (46); Official Opposition (39): New Democratic (39); Parties without official status (1): Progressive Tory (1); Vacancies (1): Vacant (1)

Elections
- Last election: May 29, 2023
- Next election: On or before October 18, 2027

Meeting place
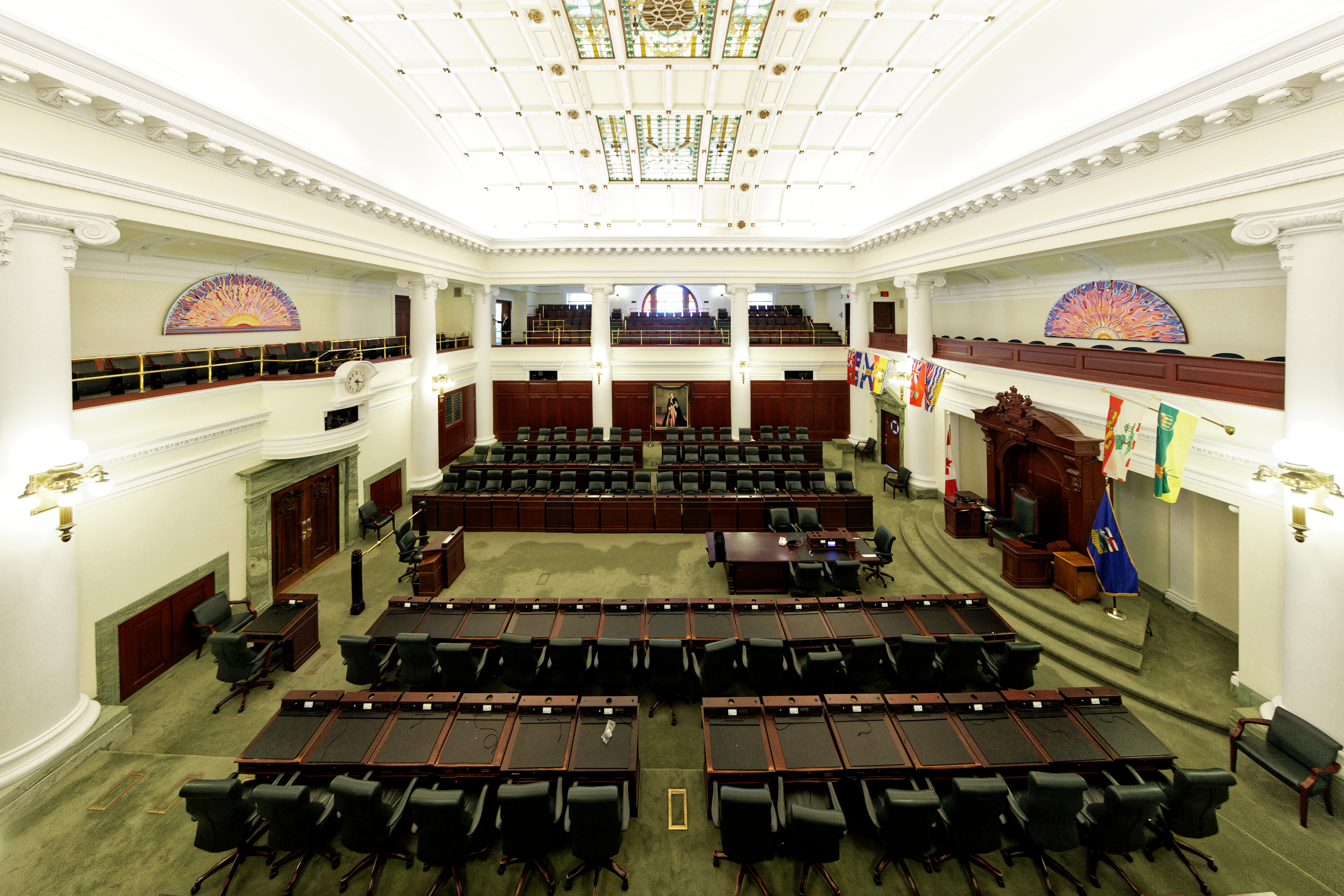
- Alberta Legislature Building; Edmonton, Alberta, Canada

Website
- assembly.ab.ca

The Legislative Assembly of Alberta is the deliberative assembly of the province of Alberta, Canada. It sits in the Alberta Legislature Building in Edmonton. Since 2012 the Legislative Assembly has had 87 members, elected through first past the post from single-member electoral districts. Bills passed by the Legislative Assembly are given royal assent by the lieutenant governor of Alberta, as the viceregal representative of the King of Canada. The Legislative Assembly and the Lieutenant Governor together make up the unicameral Alberta Legislature.

The maximum period between general elections of the assembly, as set by Section 4 of the Canadian Charter of Rights and Freedoms is five years, which is further reinforced in Alberta's Legislative Assembly Act. Convention dictates the premier controls the date of election and usually selects a date in the fourth or fifth year after the preceding election. Amendments to Alberta's Election Act introduced in 2024 fixed the date of election to the third Monday in October in the fourth calendar year following the preceding election. Alberta has never had a minority government and an election as a result of a vote of no confidence has never occurred.

To be a candidate for election to the assembly, a person must be a Canadian citizen older than 18 who has lived in Alberta for at least six months before the election and has registered with Elections Alberta under the Election Finances and Contributions Disclosure Act. Senators, senators-in-waiting, members of the House of Commons, and criminal inmates are ineligible.

The 30th Alberta Legislature was dissolved on May 1, 2023. The members-elect of the 31st Alberta Legislature were elected on May 29.

== History ==
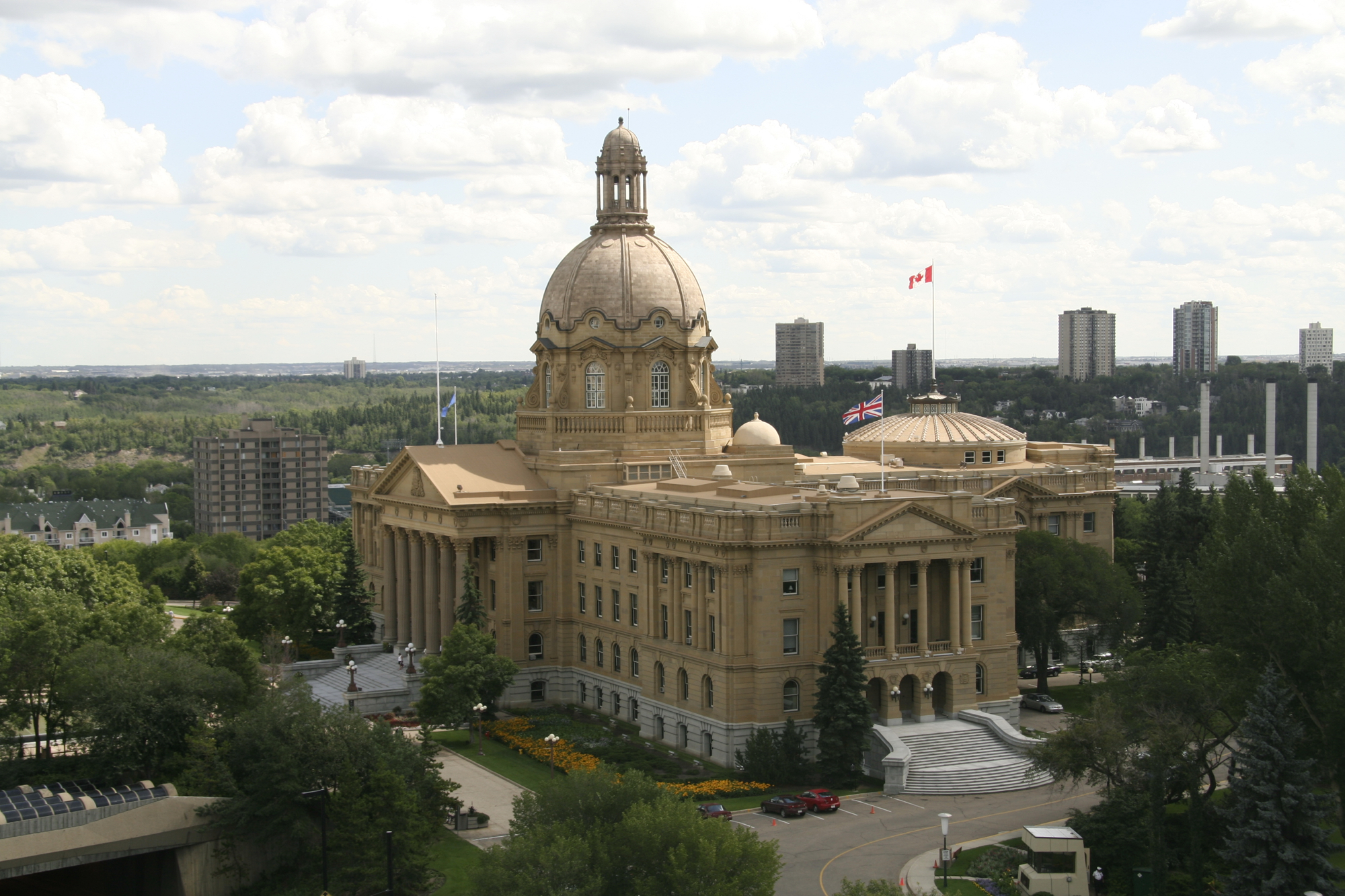
The Alberta Legislature Building has housed the chamber of the Legislative Assembly since its completion in 1913.

The first session of the first Legislature of Alberta opened on March 15, 1906, in the Thistle Rink, Edmonton, north of Jasper Avenue. After the speech from the throne, the assembly held its sessions in the McKay Avenue School. In this school Alberta MLAs chose the provincial capital, Edmonton, and the future site for the Alberta Legislature Building: the bank of the North Saskatchewan River. Allan Merrick Jeffers, a graduate of the Rhode Island School of Design was the architect who was chosen to build the assembly building. From 1908 to 1911 the Legislative Assembly met in a hall annexed to the old Terrace Building.

In September 1912 Prince Arthur, Duke of Connaught and Strathearn, Governor General of Canada, declared the new Legislature building officially open.

Louise McKinney and Roberta MacAdams were the first women elected to the assembly, in the 1917 election, the first women in any legislature of the British Empire.

From 1926 to 1955, Edmonton and Calgary MLAs were elected through a form of proportional representation, while in that period, the other MLAs were elected using instant-runoff voting.

In 1965, the Alberta Election Act was amended to give the vote to Treaty Indians.

Early majorities in the Legislature were held by the Alberta Liberal Party, followed by the United Farmers of Alberta and Alberta Social Credit Party. The Progressive Conservatives held the legislature from 1971 until 2015, when the Alberta New Democratic Party held a majority for a single term. Since 2019, the United Conservative Party has held successive majorities.

== Current members ==
Most members of the 31st Alberta Legislature were elected in the 31st Alberta general election held on May 29, 2023, but some were elected in subsequent by-elections. Peter Guthrie was elected as a UCP candidate but has since become a Progressive Tory. Bold indicates cabinet members, and party leaders are italicized.

Member	Party	Electoral district	First elected / previously elected	No. of terms
Peter Guthrie	Progressive Tory	Airdrie-Cochrane	2019	2nd term
Angela Pitt	United Conservative	Airdrie-East	2015	3rd term
Glenn van Dijken	United Conservative	Athabasca-Barrhead-Westlock	2015	3rd term
Sarah Elmeligi	New Democratic	Banff-Kananaskis	2023	1st term
Scott Cyr	United Conservative	Bonnyville-Cold Lake-St. Paul	2015, 2023	2nd term*
**Danielle Smith**	United Conservative	Brooks-Medicine Hat	2012, (Note: Highwood (First Elected as a Wildrose)) 2022	3rd term*
Diana Batten	New Democratic	Calgary-Acadia	2023	1st term
Amanda Chapman	New Democratic	Calgary-Beddington	2023	1st term
Irfan Sabir	New Democratic	Calgary-Bhullar-McCall	2015	3rd term
**Demetrios Nicolaides**	United Conservative	Calgary-Bow	2019	2nd term
Joe Ceci	New Democratic	Calgary-Buffalo	2015	3rd term
**Mickey Amery**	United Conservative	Calgary-Cross	2019	2nd term
Janet Eremenko	New Democratic	Calgary-Currie	2023	1st term
Peter Singh	United Conservative	Calgary-East	2019	2nd term
Julia Hayter	New Democratic	Calgary-Edgemont	2023	1st term
Samir Kayande	New Democratic	Calgary-Elbow	2023	1st term
Parmeet Singh Boparai	New Democratic	Calgary-Falconridge	2023	1st term
**Myles McDougall**	United Conservative	Calgary-Fish Creek	2023	1st term
Court Ellingson	New Democratic	Calgary-Foothills	2023	1st term
Nagwan Al-Guneid	New Democratic	Calgary-Glenmore	2023	1st term
Ric McIver	United Conservative	Calgary-Hays	2012	4th term
Lizette Tejada	New Democratic	Calgary-Klein	2023	1st term
Eric Bouchard	United Conservative	Calgary-Lougheed	2023	1st term
Kathleen Ganley	New Democratic	Calgary-Mountain View	2015	3rd term
Muhammad Yaseen	United Conservative	Calgary-North	2019	2nd term
Gurinder Brar	New Democratic	Calgary-North East	2023	1st term
**Rajan Sawhney**	United Conservative	Calgary-North West	2019	2nd term
**Tanya Fir**	United Conservative	Calgary-Peigan	2019	2nd term
Kyle Campbell	New Democratic	Calgary-Shaw	2026	1st term
Matt Jones	United Conservative	Calgary-South East	2019	2nd term
Luanne Metz	New Democratic	Calgary-Varsity	2023	1st term
Mike Ellis	United Conservative	Calgary-West	2014	4th term
Jackie Lovely	United Conservative	Camrose	2019	2nd term
**Joseph Schow**	United Conservative	Cardston-Siksika	2019	2nd term
**Todd Loewen**	United Conservative	Central Peace-Notley	2019	2nd term
Chantelle de Jonge	United Conservative	Chestermere-Strathmore	2023	1st term
**Justin Wright**	United Conservative	Cypress-Medicine Hat	2023	1st term
**Andrew Boitchenko**	United Conservative	Drayton Valley-Devon	2023	1st term
Nate Horner	United Conservative	Drumheller-Stettler	2019	2nd term
Peggy Wright	New Democratic	Edmonton-Beverly-Clareview	2023	1st term
Nicole Goehring	New Democratic	Edmonton-Castle Downs	2015	3rd term
David Shepherd	New Democratic	Edmonton-City Centre	2015	3rd term
Sharif Haji	New Democratic	Edmonton-Decore	2023	1st term
Gurtej Singh Brar	New Democratic	Edmonton-Ellerslie	2025	1st term
Sarah Hoffman	New Democratic	Edmonton-Glenora	2015	3rd term
Marlin Schmidt	New Democratic	Edmonton-Gold Bar	2015	3rd term
Janis Irwin	New Democratic	Edmonton-Highlands-Norwood	2019	2nd term
Heather Sweet	New Democratic	Edmonton-Manning	2015	3rd term
Lorne Dach	New Democratic	Edmonton-McClung	2015	3rd term
Jasvir Deol	New Democratic	Edmonton-Meadows	2019	2nd term
Christina Gray	New Democratic	Edmonton-Mill Woods	2015	3rd term
David Eggen	New Democratic	Edmonton-North West	2004, 2012	5th term*
Lori Sigurdson	New Democratic	Edmonton-Riverview	2015	3rd term
Jodi Calahoo Stonehouse	New Democratic	Edmonton-Rutherford	2023	1st term
Rhiannon Hoyle	New Democratic	Edmonton-South	2023	1st term
Nathan Ip	New Democratic	Edmonton-South West	2023	1st term
Naheed Nenshi	New Democratic	Edmonton-Strathcona	2025	1st term
Brooks Arcand-Paul	New Democratic	Edmonton-West Henday	2023	1st term
Rakhi Pancholi	New Democratic	Edmonton-Whitemud	2019	2nd term
**Brian Jean**	United Conservative	Fort McMurray-Lac La Biche	2015, (Note: First elected as a Wildrose) 2022	3rd term*
Tany Yao	United Conservative	Fort McMurray-Wood Buffalo	2015	3rd term
Jackie Armstrong-Homeniuk	United Conservative	Fort Saskatchewan-Vegreville	2019	2nd term
Nolan Dyck	United Conservative	Grande Prairie	2023	1st term
Ron Wiebe	United Conservative	Grande Prairie-Wapiti	2023	1st term
**RJ Sigurdson**	United Conservative	Highwood	2019	2nd term
**Devin Dreeshen**	United Conservative	Innisfail-Sylvan Lake	2018	3rd term
		Lac Ste. Anne-Parkland		
Jennifer Johnson	United Conservative	Lacombe-Ponoka	2023	1st term
Brandon Lunty	United Conservative	Leduc-Beaumont	2023	1st term
Scott Sinclair	United Conservative	Lesser Slave Lake	2023	1st term
**Nathan Neudorf**	United Conservative	Lethbridge-East	2019	2nd term
Rob Miyashiro	New Democratic	Lethbridge-West	2024	1st term
Chelsae Petrovic	United Conservative	Livingstone-Macleod	2023	1st term
**Rick Wilson**	United Conservative	Maskwacis-Wetaskiwin	2019	2nd term
**Dale Nally**	United Conservative	Morinville-St. Albert	2019	2nd term
**Tara Sawyer**	United Conservative	Olds-Didsbury-Three Hills	2025	1st term
**Dan Williams**	United Conservative	Peace River	2019	2nd term
**Adriana LaGrange**	United Conservative	Red Deer-North	2019	2nd term
Jason Stephan	United Conservative	Red Deer-South	2019	2nd term
**Jason Nixon**	United Conservative	Rimbey-Rocky Mountain House-Sundre	2015	3rd term
Kyle Kasawski	New Democratic	Sherwood Park	2023	1st term
**Searle Turton**	United Conservative	Spruce Grove-Stony Plain	2019	2nd term
Marie Renaud	New Democratic	St. Albert	2015	3rd term
**Nate Glubish**	United Conservative	Strathcona-Sherwood Park	2019	2nd term
**Grant Hunter**	United Conservative	Taber-Warner	2015	3rd term
Garth Rowswell	United Conservative	Vermilion-Lloydminster-Wainwright	2019	2nd term
**Martin Long**	United Conservative	West Yellowhead	2019	2nd term

== Standings during 31st Assembly ==
The 31st Alberta Legislative Assembly was constituted after the general election on May 29, 2023. The United Conservative Party, led by incumbent Premier Danielle Smith, formed the government with a reduced majority. The New Democrats, led by former Premier Rachel Notley, won the second most seats and formed the official opposition. In December 2025, under recall election legislation introduced by the UCP, 21 MLAs had recall petition campaigns in progress; this included Premier Danielle Smith. 20 of the petitions were against UCP members. None of the petitions were successful.

Standings in the 31st Alberta Legislature
Affiliation	Members	
Affiliation	2023 general election	Current
United Conservative	49	47
New Democratic	38	39
Progressive Tory	0	1
Independent	0	0
Vacant	0	0
Total seats	87	

== Seating plan ==
- Party leaders are italicized. Bold indicates cabinet minister.

			Schmidt	Brar	Metz	Campbell	Goehring	Ceci		Dach	L. Sigurdson	Miyashiro	Deol
	Boparai	Hayter	Tejada	Batten	Irwin	Ip	Brar	Ganley		Kasawski	Eremenko	Hoyle	Chapman	Renaud	Kayande		Guthrie
	Elmeligi	Al-Guneid	Arcand-Paul	Sabir	Hoffman	Calahoo Stonehouse	Eggen	Gray	Nenshi	Pancholi	Ellingson	Calahoo Stonehouse	Shepherd	Haji	P. Wright	Sweet
McIver
	**RJ Sigurdson**	**Nicolaides**	**Sawhney**	**Williams**	**Glubish**	**LaGrange**	**Nixon**	**Schow**	**Smith**	**Ellis**	**Amery**	**Neudorf**	**Loewen**	**Wilson**	**Jean**	**Dreeshen**	**Fir**
	Pitt	van Dijken	Stephan	**Boitchenko**	**McDougall**	**Long**	**Nally**	Lunty		**Hunter**	**Sawyer**	**J. Wright**	**Turton**	**Yaseen**	Rowswell	Cyr
			Armstong-Homeniuk	Johnson	Wiebe	Petrovic	Horner	Dyck		Yao	Jones	de Jonge	Bouchard	Sinclair	Lovely

== Past Composition ==
1905–1909

23	2
Lib	Con

1909–1913

36	2	1	1	1
Lib	Con	Soc	Ind	Ind Lib

1913–1917

39	17
Lib	Con

1917–1921

34	19	2	1
Lib	Con	NPL	Lab Rep

1921–1926

15	1	38	4	3
Lib	Con	UFA	DLP	Ind

1926–1930

7	4	43	5	1
Lib	Con	UFA	DLP	Ind Lab

1930–1935

11	6	39	4	3
Lib	Con	UFA	DLP	Ind

1935–1940

5	2	56
Lib	Con	Soc Cred

1940–1944

1	1	36	19
Lib	Lab	Soc Cred	Ind Mov

1944–1948

51	3	2	1	3
Soc Cred	CAF	Co-op	VAF	Ind Mov

1948–1952

2	51	2	1	1
Lib	Soc Cred	Co-op	ICA	Ind Soc Cred

1952–1955

3	1	1	53	2	1
Lib	Con	PC	Soc Cred	Co-op	Ind Soc Cred

1955–1959

15	2	37	2	1	1	1
Lib	Con	Soc Cred	Co-op	Lib-Con	Coal	Ind Soc Cred

1959–1963

1	1	61	1	1
Lib	PC	Soc Cred	Coal	Ind Soc Cred

1963–1967

2	60	1
Lib	Soc Cred	Coal

1967–1971

3	6	55	1
Lib	PC	Soc Cred	Ind

1971–1975

49	25	1
PC	Soc Cred	NDP

1975–1979

69	4	1	1
PC	Soc Cred	NDP	Ind Soc Cred

1979–1982

74	4	1
PC	Soc Cred	NDP

1982–1986

75	2	2
PC	NDP	Ind

1986–1989

4	61	16	2
Lib	PC	NDP	Rep

1989–1993

8	59	16
Lib	PC	NDP

1993–1997

32	51
Lib	PC

1997–2001

18	63	2
Lib	PC	NDP

2001–2004

7	74	2
Lib	PC	NDP

2004–2008

16	62	4	1
Lib	PC	NDP	AA

2008–2012

9	72	2
Lib	PC	NDP

2012–2015

5	61	4	17
Lib	PC	NDP	WR

2015–2019

1	9	54	21	1
Lib	PC	NDP	WR	AP

2019–2023

63	24
UC	NDP

2023–Present

49	38
UC	NDP
