= Alberta separatist movement =

Secessionist movement in Canada

Location of Alberta in Canada

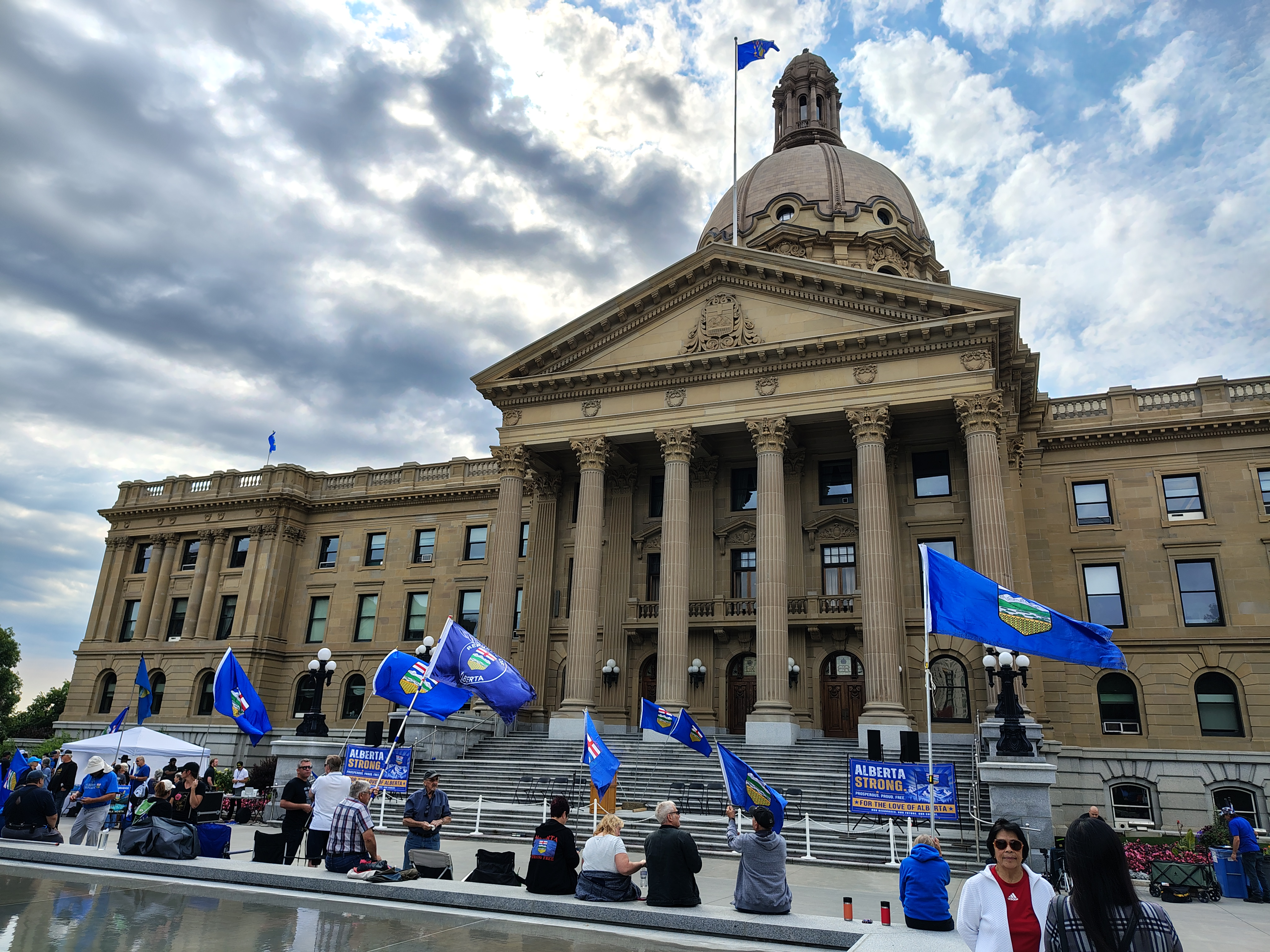
Alberta separatists preparing for a rally at the Alberta Legislature Building in Edmonton

The Alberta separatist movement (Note: Also known as the Alberta independence movement or the Alberta sovereignty movement.) is a secessionist movement that advocates for the separation of the province of Alberta from Canada, with minor groups also supporting the creation of a sovereign union with the other provinces of Western Canada, and other groups supporting Alberta joining the United States.

The main issues driving separatist sentiment have been a perceived power disparity relative to the federal government and other western provinces, as well as discontent with national economic policy, particularly as it pertains to Alberta's petroleum industry and equalization payments. As such, Alberta separatism is an expression of Western alienation. The concept of separation gained considerable media attention in the aftermath of the 2025 federal election. In 2025, the Alberta Forever Canada citizen initiative opposing Alberta's separation from Canada was launched and verified by Elections Alberta as meeting the required number of signatures. In early 2026, Elections Alberta approved a petition which, pending legal challenges, intended to lead to a separation referendum.

On May 13, 2026, Alberta Justice Shaina Leonard ruled in favour of several First Nations whose lawyers argued that using Alberta's referendum process for possible separation of Alberta from Canada was unconstitutional because First Nations were not consulted and that separation under these circumstances would violate treaty rights. This issue of treaty rights arises because Alberta is within the territories of several of the Numbered Treaties between First Nations and the monarchy of Canada agreed to before Alberta became a province. On May 21, Alberta Premier Danielle Smith responded to the ruling by announcing that Alberta would hold a referendum on whether to trigger the process for holding a binding referendum on Alberta separating from Canada. The independence referendum was held on October 19 alongside nine other referendum questions. The referendum resulted in a large majority choosing the option of Alberta remaining within Canada, with 25% of voters (the majority of whom reside in rural Alberta) in favour of a proposal to hold a binding referendum on separation from Canada.

Alberta's secession would be subject to the federal Clarity Act and the Supreme Court's ruling in Reference Re Secession of Quebec, both of which require a clear referendum result followed by constitutional negotiations, not unilateral separation. Recent legal challenges have also emphasized that any separation process must comply with the Constitution of Canada and uphold the treaty and constitutional rights of Indigenous peoples and other minorities.

== History ==
=== 1940s to 1970s ===
The discovery of vast reserves of oil in the 1940s ushered in a twenty-year period of intense exploration, new discoveries, and rapid expansion of Alberta's oil industry. According to journalist Jen Gerson, however, Alberta was still "heavily rural and bitter with western grievance. Freight rates and protectionism made economic diversification in the prairies all but impossible. It was said to be cheaper to send cows to slaughterhouses or grain to mills in Ontario than it was to ship meat or flour."

According to political scientists David Elton and Roger Gibbins, a 1969 provincial poll found that only 5 per cent of those polled "expressed interest in even discussing the merits of separation."

In the 1970s, the world experienced two major oil crises. The first, the 1973 oil crisis, coincided with the Yom Kippur War that same year: the decision by the United States to support Israel in the conflict caused retaliation by Egypt and Syria, enacting an oil embargo that resulted in oil prices spiking in North America. The second oil crisis came in 1979, in the wake of the Iranian Revolution. Some members of the Organization of the Petroleum Exporting Countries (OPEC) and a few similarly minded oil-rich nations had ceased all oil exports to the United States and countries that supported Israel. In both cases, the price of oil sold to North America spiked and service stations ran out of fuel; long lines were evident at gas stations across North America.

The Alberta government and the Canadian federal government responded politically to address oil reserves and conservation of petroleum resources. In 1971, the Alberta government, headed by Harry Strom, created an environmental ministry, the first of its kind, with a mandate to manage and conserve Alberta's natural resources. Federally, in 1974, the Office of Energy Conservation was created. Conflict arose between Alberta and Canada after the 1973 crisis, over the management and distribution of Alberta's oil resources, and financial wealth. Nevertheless, support for independence remained a fringe phenomenon. A 1974 survey conducted in Calgary found less than four per cent of respondents "expressed even the most cautious support for separatism"; three years later, a 1977 survey by the Calgary Herald found that only 2.7 per cent of Albertans supported independence.

=== 1980–1984 ===
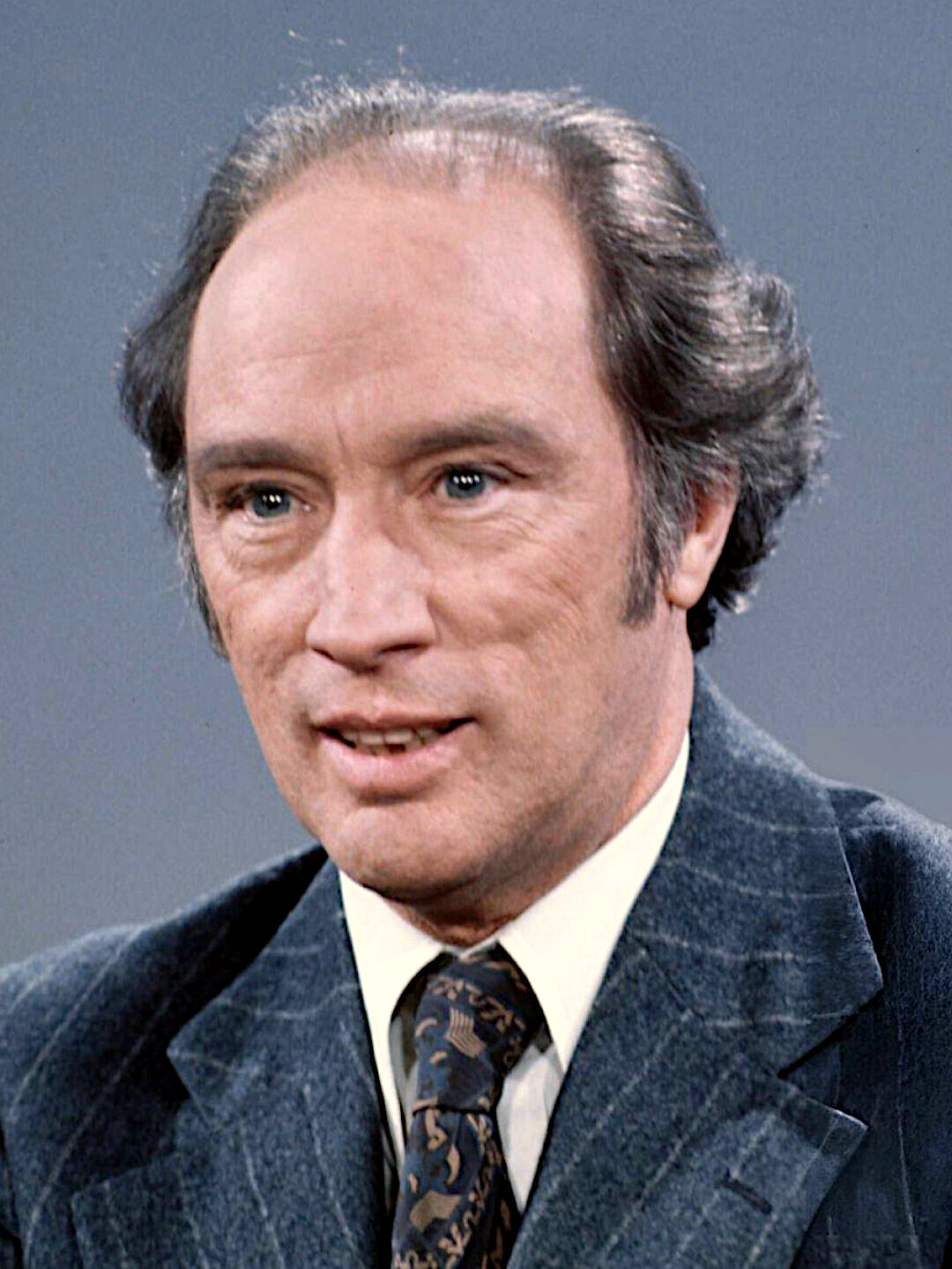
Prime Minister Pierre Trudeau and his federal National Energy Program (NEP) have been regarded as causing a rise of Alberta separatism in the early 1980s.

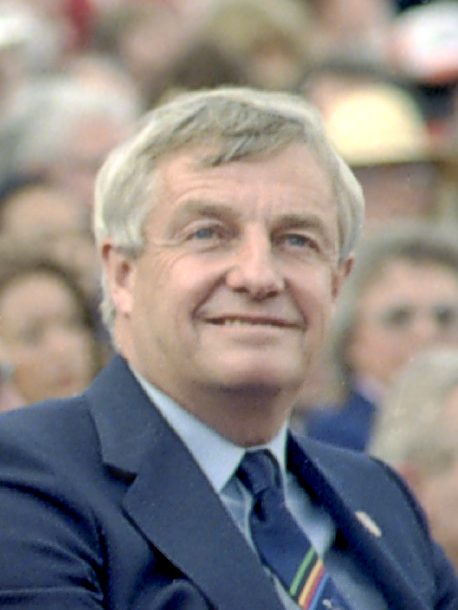
Alberta Premier Peter Lougheed and his government disputed with the Trudeau federal government over the NEP in the 1980s.

Long-term oil prices, 1861–2007 (top line adjusted for inflation)

Alberta experienced rapid economic growth in the oil sector amid international oil crises that raised oil prices. In October 1980, the federal government led by Prime Minister Pierre Trudeau, implemented the National Energy Program (NEP). The Trudeau government argued that Canadian ownership and control of natural resources were important to national energy security. Trudeau also argued that Canada's energy policy had become divisive and required greater fairness in revenue sharing. The program expanded domestic price controls, included revenue-sharing measures, incentives for oil exploration on federally owned lands, and a tax on oil and gas revenues but excluded the oil sands. Alberta Premier Peter Lougheed opposed these aspects of the program. He challenged the program in court and criticized it publicly, including in a televised address in which he warned that the NEP would bring more "Ottawa" into Alberta's affairs.

Lougheed threatened to reduce Alberta's oil and gas production if the federal government increased taxes on the industry. Reduced Alberta production would have required Central Canadian refineries and businesses to purchase foreign oil, which the federal government would have subsidized. Lougheed argued that the federal government could not afford that subsidy while running a $13.7-billion deficit in 1980. He announced a 60,000-barrel reduction in Alberta's crude oil production over nine months beginning in April 1981. He also suspended two oil sands projects. A 1981 Canada West Foundation poll found that 49% of respondents agreed that "Western Canadians get so few benefits from being part of Canada that they might as well go it on their own." In 1981, the Oil Accord removed parts of the NEP that Alberta opposed. Many Albertans viewed the NEP as federal intrusion into provincial affairs. Edmonton economist Alan Scarfe argued that many people in Western Canada, especially Alberta, viewed the NEP as a policy that benefited eastern provinces at Alberta's expense.

Shortly after the NEP's implementation, the 1980s oil glut began. Energy prices fell sharply because of declining demand. Lower prices contributed to a recession in Alberta, the abandonment of oil and gas projects, and high unemployment. Lower international prices also led Eastern Canada to purchase foreign oil, undermining the NEP's goal of self-sufficiency.

The NEP has been blamed for an infrastructure deficit, and reduced growth of the Alberta Heritage Savings Trust Fund, which was meant to save as much of the earnings during high oil prices to act as a "rainy day" cushion if oil prices collapsed because of the oil and gas industry's cyclical nature. A popular slogan that appeared on bumper stickers was "Let the Eastern bastards freeze in the dark." Another sticker said, "I'd rather push this thing a mile than buy gas from PetroCan."

In October 1980, when Trudeau dismissed the threat of Alberta separatism as a bargaining tool from Western Canadian premiers, Lougheed agreed, telling Don Newman that no one in Western Canada wanted to separate and they were "part of the mainstream of Canadian life". But some argued that Lougheed ran a hostile and polarizing campaign against federal oil and gas policy and forced Albertans to choose between provincial and national citizenship. Hostility toward the federal government contributed to Alberta separatism, which became more visible when separatist Gordon Kesler was elected to the Legislative Assembly of Alberta in a 1982 by-election. British Columbia lawyer Doug Christie formed the Western Canada Concept to promote western separatism. The party drew 2,700 people to a speech at the Jubilee Auditorium in Edmonton. In the 1982 provincial election, the Western Canada Concept received 111,131 votes (11.8% of the total vote), but did not elect any members.

=== 1984 to mid-2010s ===
In 1997, the Supreme Court of Canada delivered unanimous reasons in 'Reference Re Secession of Quebec regarding the legality, under both Canadian and international law, of a unilateral secession of Quebec from Canada.

Separatism and the Western Canada Concept's popularity declined after Brian Mulroney led the Progressive Conservative Party to victory in the 1984 federal election. Mulroney agreed to the Western Accord on Energy, which phased out the NEP over three years. But by the end of Mulroney's time in office, many Albertans viewed his government as neglectful of Western Canada.

Two attempts at separatist political parties occurred in the early 2000s. The Alberta Independence Party was founded before the 2001 Alberta general election, but did not gather sufficient signatures to register as a political party. In the election it unsuccessfully ran 14 of its supporters as independent candidates, receiving approximately 7,500 votes. In the 2004 election, the Separation Party of Alberta nominated 12 candidates who won 4,680 votes (0.5% of provincial total), without electing a candidate.

There was significant opposition in Alberta to the Kyoto Protocol, as it was believed to have bad effects on the provincial economy, which is based to a large degree on the oil and gas industry. (Alberta had the world's second largest proven reserves of oil, behind only Saudi Arabia.)

Naturalized Albertan Stephen Harper became Prime Minister of Canada in a minority government in the 2006 federal election. Harper had been a significant figure in the Reform Party and led the Canadian Alliance from 2002 until its merger with the PCs. Due to Harper's Reform roots, Albertans believed he could be trusted to protect Alberta's interests. As a result, separatism sat on the sidelines, with uncertain prospects. Some pundits predicted that this result would cause support for separatism to ebb.

Public support for separation existed but remained limited during this period. In January 2004, Premier Ralph Klein told Reader's Digest that one in four Albertans supported separation. In August 2005, a poll commissioned by the Western Standard found that 42% of Albertans and 35.6% of respondents across the four western provinces supported the statement "Western Canadians should begin to explore the idea of forming their own country."

In 2000, Parliament passed the Clarity Act at the urging of Prime Minister Jean Chrétien. The Act sets out the conditions under which the federal government may enter negotiations after a provincial referendum on secession. It requires a clear referendum question and a clear majority of eligible voters in favour of secession before negotiations can begin. The Act does not give a numerical threshold for a clear majority. Instead, the House of Commons decides whether the referendum question was clear and whether a clear majority voted to secede.

=== Mid-2010s to present ===
Many Albertan separatists date their support for the movement to the Canadian federal election victory of Justin Trudeau's Liberal Party on October 19, 2015. At a town hall in Peterborough, Ontario, on January 13, 2017, Trudeau said, "We can't shut down the oil sands tomorrow. We need to phase them out. We need to manage the transition off of our dependence on fossil fuels. That is going to take time." At a hockey game in Edmonton the next day, Trudeau was loudly booed by the crowd. His unpopularity in Alberta was a significant rallying point for separatists. The topic of Alberta separating from Canada was the subject of a number of mainstream media reports.

In 2015, geopolitical analyst Peter Zeihan said, "Right now, every man, woman and child in Alberta pays $6,000 more into the national budget than they get back. Alberta is the only province that is a net contributor to that budget — by 2020, the number will exceed $20,000 per person, $40,000 per taxpayer. That will be the greatest wealth transfer in per capita terms in the Western world." Per Statistics Canada, in 2015 Alberta paid $27 billion more into the federal treasury than it received in services. Zeihan also said, "Alberta as an independent country doesn’t solve a huge number of problems. If it left Canada, its currency goes through the roof because all it has is oil exports, and that would drive agriculture out of business. It would be a one-horse economy in a very short time [...] Seceding to the U.S. becomes the only political and economic option. If you do that, the inflation issue goes away, the tax problem goes away, the security problem goes away." In 2026, Zeihan said Alberta would be "screwed" if it became an independent country because oil and grain are "US dollar denominated commodities [...] exporting for hard currency, you have an inflationary environment very, very, very quickly [...] it would be difficult to survive in a country that now has a very, very limited labor pool".

A September 2018 Ipsos poll found that 62% of Albertans believed Alberta "does not get its fair share from Confederation" (up from 45% in 1997), 46% felt "more attached to their province than to their country" (up from 39% in 1997), 34% "feel less committed to Canada than I did a few years ago" (up from 22% in 1997), 18% believed "the views of western Canadians are adequately represented in Ottawa" (down from 22% in 2001), and 25% believed "My province would be better off if it separated from Canada" (up from 19% in 2001).

A February 2019 Angus Reid poll found 50% of Albertans would support secession from Canada but also found the likelihood of that "remote".

After Trudeau's Liberals were reelected with a minority government in the federal election on October 21, 2019, #Wexit (a wordplay on "Brexit", the United Kingdom's departure from the European Union) trended on social media. On November 4, the separatist group "Wexit Alberta" applied for federal political party status. On November 6, an Ipsos poll showed historically high interest in secession in both Alberta and Saskatchewan, at 33% and 27%, respectively. On January 12, 2020, Wexit Canada was granted eligibility for the next federal election. They changed their name to the Maverick Party and contested the 2021 election, garnering 1.3% of the vote in Alberta.

A May 2020 poll by Northwest Research for Derek Fildebrandt's Western Standard found that 41% of respondents would support independence in a referendum, 50% would be opposed, and 9% were not sure. Removing undecideds, 45% would support and 55% would be opposed. Respondents were also asked if they would support a referendum if "the federal government is unwilling to negotiate with Alberta on a new constitutional arrangement": 48% said yes, while 52% said no. Support for independence was higher outside of Alberta's two biggest cities, with Edmonton being the most opposed.

During the COVID-19 pandemic, some activists involved in anti-COVID-19 protests were recruited into the separatist movement, which benefited from their political skills, audiences and networks. During the 2022 United Conservative Party leadership election, candidate Danielle Smith told the separatist Alberta Prosperity Project that one of her first steps would be to reach out to them, arguing that they had power due to the separatists joining the party.

In May 2025, supporters of Alberta independence or greater separation from Canada cited economic and political reasons as their main motivations, including resource and energy management, taxation, and federal policy. Modern Alberta separatism also differs from the Quebec sovereignty movement in its partisan base. In Alberta, support comes primarily from the political right, while Quebec sovereignty has drawn support from both the left and the right. According to an Angus Reid poll, 65% of United Conservative Party voters would vote for separation, while 97% of Alberta NDP voters would vote to stay in Canada. Many Albertans also said they would stop supporting separation if the federal government adopted more oil-and-gas-friendly policies, such as building pipelines or repealing energy regulations. This suggests that support for Alberta separation is primarily economic, unlike the Quebec sovereignty movement.

In the lead-up to the 2025 federal election, some Alberta politicians and activists said that another Liberal Party victory after 10 years of government would increase support for secession. The rise in support for the Liberal Party was partly a response to US President Donald Trump's call for Canada to be annexed by the United States. Most Canadians opposed annexation, but support was higher in Alberta than in other provinces. Some Alberta residents cited stronger cultural and economic connections with the US than with Eastern Canada.

Following the election of a minority Liberal government, Alberta's government amended the Citizen Initiative Act to make it easier for citizens to initiate referendums, including on separation from Canada. The amendments lowered the participation threshold from 20% of eligible voters to 10% of votes cast in the previous election. They also extended the signature-gathering period for petitions from 90 days to 120. Indigenous leaders criticized the amendments and raised concerns that a separation referendum could threaten existing treaty rights. The government introduced late-stage amendments to clarify that no referendum question would be permitted to jeopardize those treaty rights.

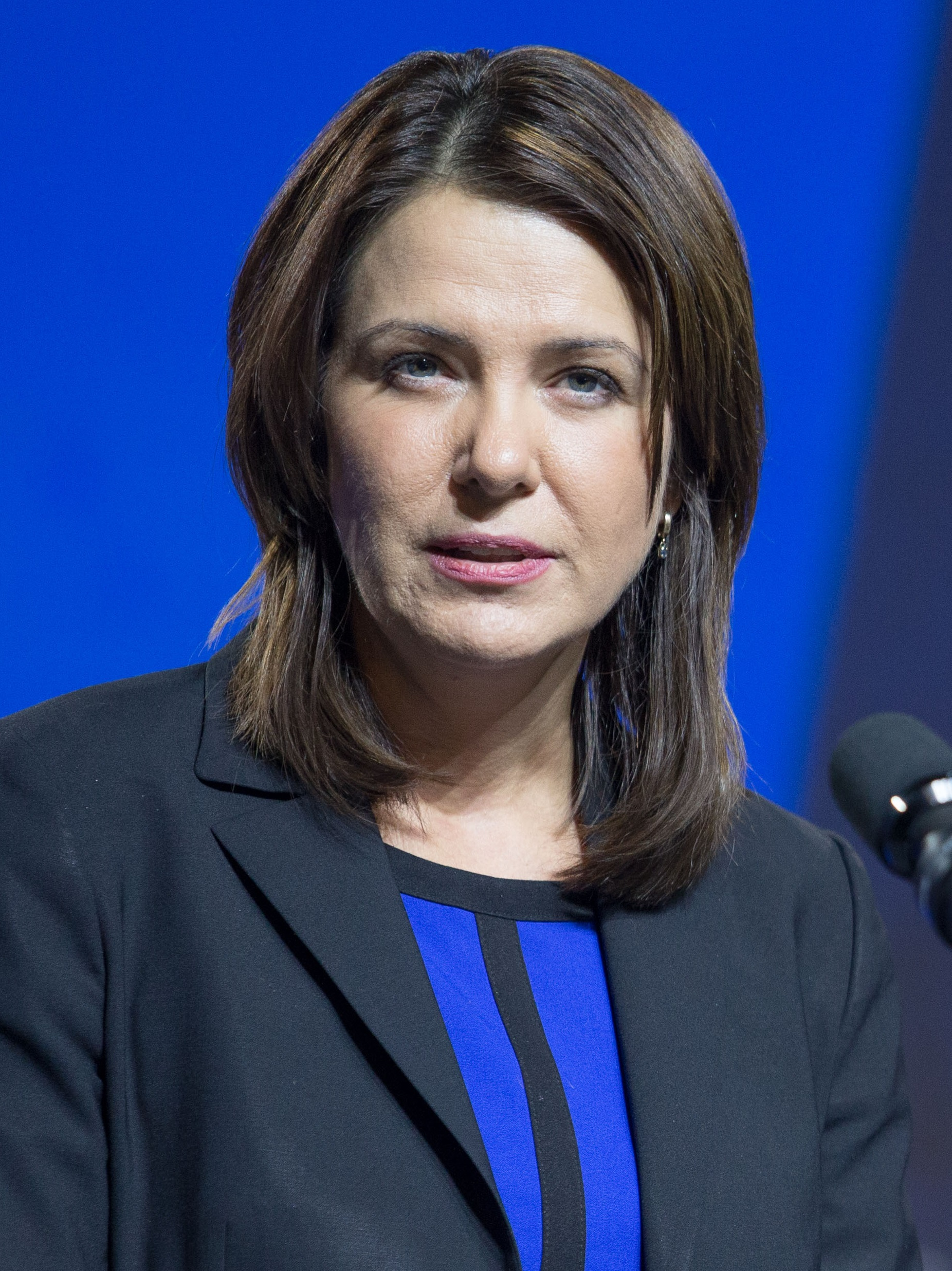
Alberta Premier Danielle Smith announced a referendum on whether Alberta should trigger the process for a binding referendum to separate from Canada.

In May 2025, Alberta Premier Danielle Smith announced that she would hold a referendum on provincial separation in 2026 if citizens gathered the required signatures. In June 2025, Alberta held three provincial by-elections. The separatist Republican Party of Alberta received 0.67% and 3.42% of the vote in two Edmonton by-elections, and 17.66% in Olds-Didsbury-Three Hills.

In June 2025, the separatist Alberta Prosperity Project, led by Mitch Sylvestre, submitted a referendum petition question: "Do you agree that the province of Alberta shall become a sovereign country and cease to be a province in Canada?" Alberta Chief Electoral Officer Gordon McClure referred the question to the Court of King's Bench of Alberta on constitutional grounds. On December 5, 2025, Justice Colin C. J. Feasby ruled that the referendum proposal violated the Constitution of Canada. The day before the judgement was released, the government tabled a bill amending the Citizen Initiative Act terminating ongoing court proceedings and removing the requirement that referendum proposals be constitutional.

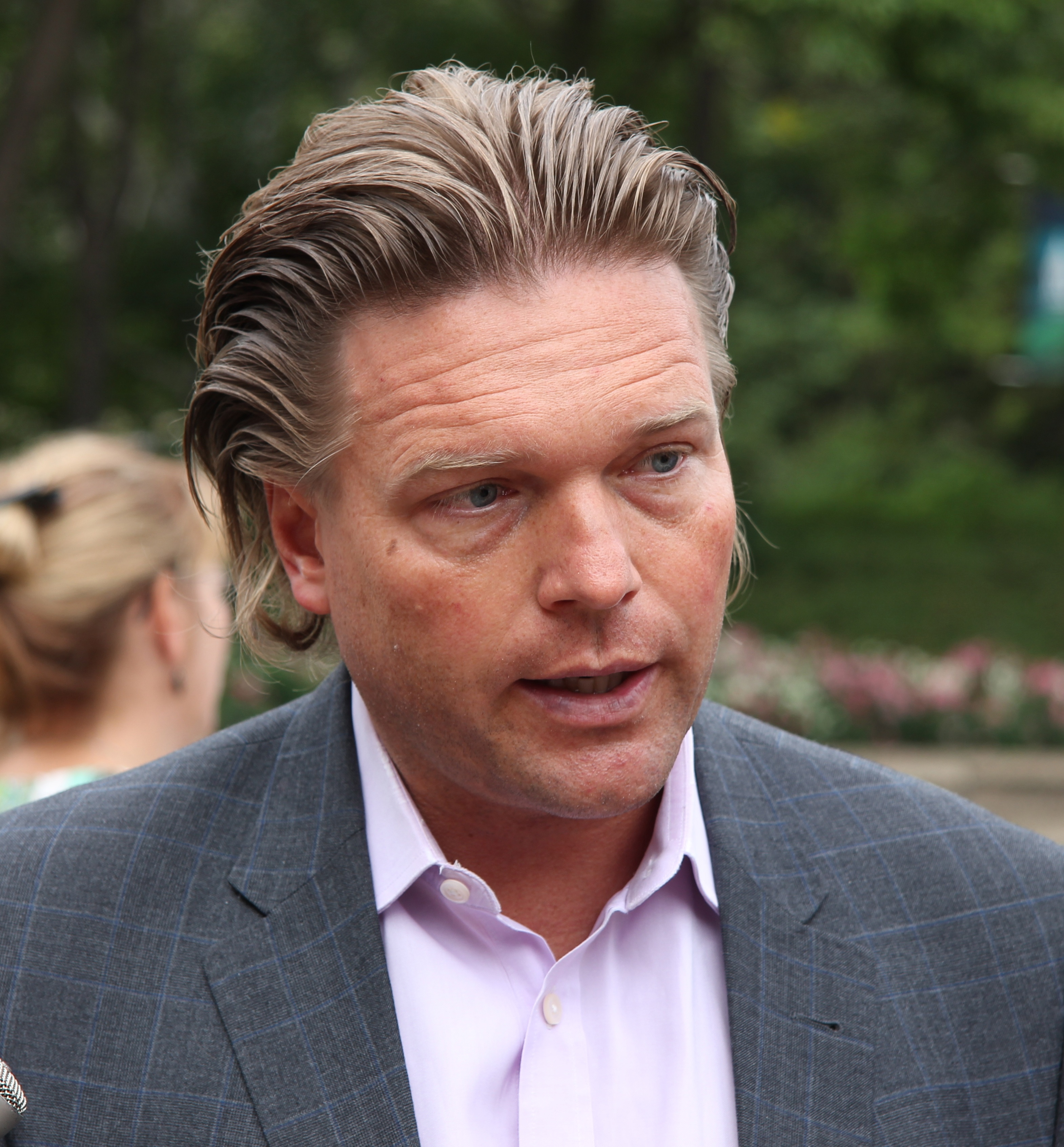
Former MLA Thomas Lukaszuk led the Forever Canada petition, opposing Alberta's separation from Canada.

Two competing referendum petitions on Alberta sovereignty followed. In August 2025, Thomas Lukaszuk launched Alberta Forever Canada, a citizen initiative opposing Alberta's separation from Canada. The proposed question asked, "Do you agree that Alberta should remain in Canada?" Lukaszuk's application cited concerns about the economic, citizenship, and treaty-rights consequences of Alberta separation. It also said that only a minority of Albertans supported independence. Elections Alberta validated Alberta Forever Canada after it received 404,293 signatures. The government then referred the proposal to a legislative committee.

Stay Free Alberta launched a second petition in support of separation. The group said it collected more than 301,000 signatures between January 3 and May 2, 2026, though this number has been disputed. Its proposed question asked, "Do you agree that the province of Alberta shall become a sovereign country and cease to be a province in Canada?" Sturgeon Lake Cree Nation, Athabasca Chipewyan First Nation, and the Blackfoot Confederacy challenged the petition. On May 13, Justice Shaina Leonard ruled that Elections Alberta could not certify it. Later that day, Smith said the government would appeal the decision.

On October 6, 2025, Smith gave Prime Minister Mark Carney until November 16 to amend nine federal laws that her government opposed, leading some to speculate that her government might pursue separatism if talks fail. During the United Conservative Party's 2025 annual general meeting, separatists booed Smith.

On April 20, 2026, Elections Alberta revealed that it believed that the APP violated third-party advertising laws by paying for public messaging over the province's $1,000 limit for non-registered groups and filed an injunction in March against them. On April 30, the Republican Party of Alberta along with the Centurion Project were implicated in a large privacy breach for distributing millions of Albertans' private information. The list was given legally to the Republican Party of Alberta but ended up hosted by the Centurion Project on a public-facing website. According to an October 2026 investigation by The Globe and Mail, the Centurion Project's tool was an Alberta adaptation of 10X Votes, voter-targeting software developed in Michigan by Drew Born and Drew Wierda to mobilize Republican voters. The Globe reported that in January 2026, APP leaders including CEO Mitch Sylvestre met a delegation from 10X Votes in a boardroom near Calgary International Airport, at a meeting arranged by organizer David Parker, who launched the Centurion Project weeks later. Elections Alberta went to court and was granted an injunction that the database be taken down. The RCMP launched an investigation collaborating with other law enforcement partners in the province to determine whether any other laws were broken.

On May 13, Justice Leonard ruled in favour of several First Nations whose lawyers argued that using Alberta's referendum process for possible separation of Alberta from Canada has been unconstitutional because First Nations were not consulted and that separation under these circumstances would violate treaty rights. Neil Dobson, the lawyer representing Alberta, said it was premature for the Alberta government to consult First Nations because it was not yet taking any action. Of a political discussion with First Nations over possible separation, he said, "The collection of signatures and the ability to put forward the petition in the first place is really the commencement of that political discussion". Jeffrey Rath of Stay Free Alberta said the organization would file an appeal. On May 21, Premier Smith announced that Alberta will hold a referendum on whether to trigger the process for holding a binding referendum on Alberta separating from Canada.

The independence referendum was held on October 19 alongside nine other referendum questions. The referendum resulted in a large majority choosing the option of Alberta remaining within Canada, with 25% of voters in favour of a proposal to hold a binding referendum on separation from Canada.

== List of separatist groups ==
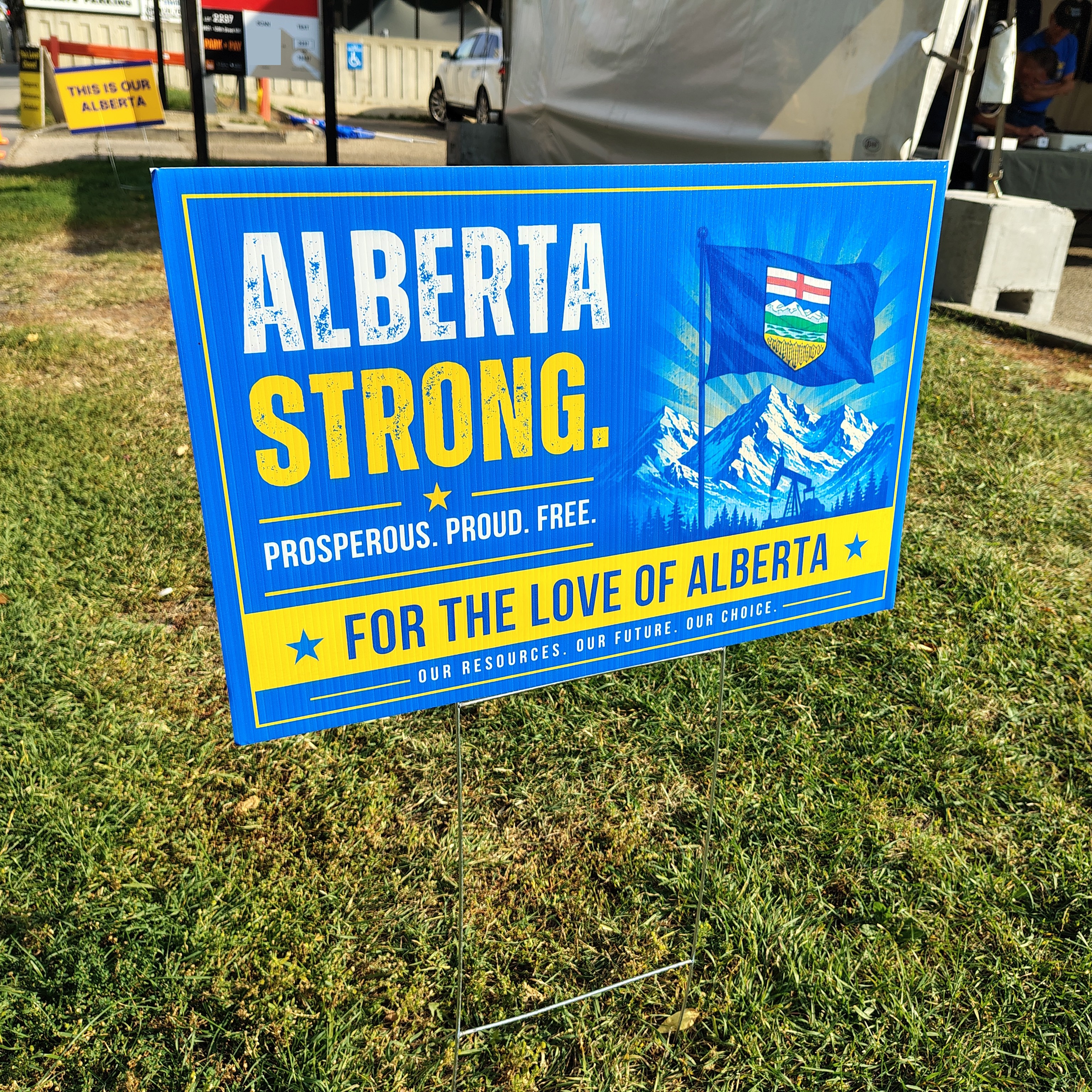
An Alberta Prosperity Project lawn sign near the Alberta Legislature Building

=== Parties registered with Elections Alberta ===
- Independence Party of Alberta
- Republican Party of Alberta (formerly the Buffalo Party of Alberta)
- Wildrose Independence Party of Alberta (formed through a merger of the Freedom Conservative Party of Alberta and Wexit Alberta)
- United Conservative Party of Alberta (elements)

==== Former political parties ====
- Alberta First Party (1999–2018)
- Wexit Alberta (2020 only; merged into the Wildrose Independence Party of Alberta)

=== Non-party groups and movements ===
- Alberta Prosperity Project
- Stay Free Alberta
- Take Back Alberta
- The Centurion Project

=== Groups interested in joining the United States ===
- Alberta 51 Project/Alberta USA Foundation
- Republican Party of Alberta (formerly the Buffalo Party of Alberta)

== External support ==
=== Quebec ===
On September 3, 2025, Parti Québécois leader Paul St-Pierre Plamondon expressed support for a future referendum on Alberta separatism, adding that Quebec and Alberta should "respect each other's desires for self-determination". Plamondon later revealed in January 2026 that he met with the leaders of the Alberta Prosperity Project in September, established a positive relationship with them, and would be open to assisting them in establishing a referendum.

=== United States ===
Between April 2025 and January 2026, the Alberta Prosperity Project met three times with United States Department of State officials. A joint meeting with the US State Department and United States Department of the Treasury was planned for February 2026 for a half trillion credit mechanism upon achieving independence. Officials for the State Department and White House said these were routine meetings with civil society groups without commitments. In January 2026, US Treasury Secretary Scott Bessent called Albertans "a very independent people" and said Alberta was a natural US partner. Canadian Prime Minister Mark Carney and Alberta Premier Danielle Smith said the US should respect Canadian sovereignty. Carney said they "expect the US administration to respect Canadian sovereignty – I'm always clear with President Trump to that effect". Smith said she expected US officials to leave discussions about the province's "democratic process" to Albertans and Canadians. A spokesperson for Smith said, "the overwhelming majority of Albertans are not interested in becoming a US state." Ontario Premier Doug Ford called on Smith to take a stand and declare that "enough is enough." He called the meetings "unethical" and "unacceptable". Jeffrey Rath, legal counsel for the Alberta Prosperity Project, said the group believed the US was "extremely enthusiastic" about an independent Alberta, claiming that its representatives had met with senior US officials who proceeded directly to the Oval Office following the discussions. Carlo Dade, an international policy expert at University of Calgary, said, "the Americans are more than happy to continue to play Canadians off each other."

On January 29, 2026, Andy Ogles, a Republican US representative, said Albertans would prefer to join the US. Rath responded that joining the US was not possible, preferring an independent Alberta with zero tariffs with the US and a single market. The US said the meetings were regular meetings that it pursues with various civic society actors and that no commitment to separatism had been pursued.

On October 3, 2026, a Globe and Mail investigation found that political operatives tied to the US Republican Party were assisting the campaign for Alberta to secede. They also found that when Alberta separatist leaders went to Washington to meet with the US State Department, they offered access to fresh water and royalties on crude oil if the US State Department helped them achieve independence. A few days later, Mitch Sylvestre, chief executive officer of the Alberta Prosperity Project, told the Mail that the office of Foreign Influence Transparency Commissioner Anton Boegman had contacted him and his group.

== Criticisms ==
A pro-remain, anti-referendum sign near the Alberta Legislature Building

=== Legal framework ===
Any attempt by Alberta to secede would be governed by the federal Clarity Act and the Supreme Court of Canada's opinion in Reference re Secession of Quebec. Alberta would first be required to hold a province-wide referendum posing a clear question about secession. Parliament would then decide whether the question and any resulting majority met the threshold for negotiations to begin.

The Clarity Act sets no numerical threshold for a "clear majority," leaving that determination to Parliament based on factors such as turnout, the size of the majority, and the broader political context.

In the Quebec Secession Reference, the Supreme Court held that a clear majority on a clear question would create a mutual obligation on all parties to the Canadian Confederation to negotiate constitutional changes, but found that no province has a unilateral right to secede — and that any negotiations must respect the Constitution of Canada, including the rights and interests of indigenous peoples in Canada and the protection of minorities.

==== Numbered Treaties ====
Map of Canada showing the Numbered Treaties between First Nations and the Crown

There is considerable First Nations opposition to Alberta separation. Alberta is covered by five Numbered Treaties between First Nations and the Crown (i.e., the Canadian state.) Treaties 4 (1874), 6 (1876), 7 (1877) , 8 (1899) were signed before Alberta was established as a part of the Northwest Territories in 1882 while Treaty 8 was signed before it became a province in 1905. Treaty 10, the last treaty overlapping Alberta’s borders, was signed a mere year later in 1906.

The Confederacy of Treaty No. 6 First Nations stated that Alberta separation would be unconstitutional, illegal, and a threat to the treaties. It made the statement in solidarity with other First Nations in Alberta, including First Nations under Treaty 7 and Treaty 8. The Confederacy's claims are that separation and the proposed referendum threatens and violates Aboriginal and treaty rights protected under section 35 of the Constitution Act, 1982. The Confederacy stated that it would continue opposing the Alberta government and the Alberta Prosperity Project over the proposed separation referendum; and reinforced that treaties are not only historical documents, but living agreements that bind all parties.

The Assembly of Treaty Chiefs, representing First Nations across Alberta, unanimously voted in June 2026 to ask RCMP to look into whether the province's Fall referendum amounts to criminal treason by Danielle Smith and her United Conservative Party. The chiefs posited that organizing the vote is an intentional treaty violation and that Smith's government is ignoring serious risks to Canada's sovereignty. In response, Smith told the chiefs to "check themselves", claiming there was a collaborative relationship between the government and ministers.

=== Creating economic uncertainty ===
Some economists have warned that separatist discourse could discourage investment in Alberta and make energy infrastructure negotiations more difficult. Retired McGill University economist Reuven Brenner compared the movement to Quebec separatism, which contributed to major companies and thousands of residents leaving Quebec. Trevor Tombe, a professor of economics at the University of Calgary estimates separation would reduce Alberta's economic activity by $20 billion (roughly $3,900 per Albertan), and make Alberta's economy $30 billion smaller. Economist Claude Lavoie notes that although an independent Alberta would collect its own taxes, it would also pay more per capita for services currently provided by the federal government, including national defence, embassies, border control, employment insurance, old age security and the criminal justice system. Lavoie argued that separation would weaken Alberta's trade position because an independent Alberta would not automatically inherit Canada's trade relationships with other countries.

In March 2026, the Calgary Chamber of Commerce released a poll of Calgary businesses on the economic effects of separatist discourse. The poll found that 83% of respondents believed the discourse increased the risk of recession and reduced business investment. It also found that 74% believed businesses were considering relocation or expansion outside Alberta; 71% believed the discourse made it harder to attract workers; 60% believed it made trade or business expansion with other provinces more difficult; and 56% believed the discourse was affecting Alberta's economy. In September 2026, a University of Calgary School of Public Policy report commissioned by the Alberta government found that it could cost from $50 billion to $170 billion in the first five years of separation while the GDP would see a loss of 10.1%, employment dropped by 10%, and the average Albertan could earn almost $5,500 less while paying $5,500 more in taxes annually. The government of Alberta debt would hit $442.3 billion due to its preexisting share of the federal debt plus the deficits.

== Online disinformation by foreign actors ==
After the Liberal Party of Canada won a minority government in the October 21, 2019, federal election, #Wexit trended on social media. The term was a wordplay on Brexit the name used for the United Kingdom's departure from the European Union. Hill+Knowlton's analysis attributed part of the online activity to disinformation and bots.

After the 2025 federal election, a website known as albertaseparatist.com appeared alongside a YouTube and TikTok account using the same name. Investigators later found that a Russian covert influence network, Storm-1516, created the website and social media accounts. Storm-1516 has created fictional websites that target audiences in several countries. A May 2026 joint report by the Global Centre for Democratic Resilience, the Centre for Artificial Intelligence, Data and Conflict, and DisinfoWatch said "Russian-aligned information infrastructure" and other social media accounts used Albertan grievances to promote separatist narratives and undermine Canada's democratic integrity, national security, and cognitive sovereignty.

In April 2026, the Canadian Digital Media Research Network, which was conducted by the Media Ecosystem Observatory (MEO), a joint project between the University of Toronto and McGill University, identified roughly 20 YouTube channels as part of a coordinated network that promotes separatism in western Canadian provinces through slopaganda. CBC News later traced some of these accounts to people from the Netherlands who hired actors to appear on the YouTube channels. A June 8, 2026, CBC Investigative report identified 14 foreign Facebook accounts posting slopaganda that are monetizing the issue.

Researchers from the Centre for Artificial Intelligence, Data, and Conflict at the University of Regina reported that from July to October 2026, 80 per cent of suspected foreign influence activity had been linked to Russian sources and 20 per cent to U.S. sources. The report points out that Russian content is covert, and can be traced to a pro-Kremlin content farm known as Pravda Network while U.S. activity is more overt, with prominent American influencers, podcasts and websites promoting Alberta separation on a variety of platforms including YouTube, Reddit and Rumble.

== Opinion polling ==
=== On the 2026 referendum question ===
A non-binding October 2026 referendum asked voters whether they support Alberta remaining a province of Canada, or support Alberta beginning the legal process to hold an actual independence referendum.

==== Graphical summary ====
From May 2026 to the scheduled referendum date.

==== Table of polls ====
Date(s) conducted	Remain in Canada	Hold separation referendum	Undecided	Lead (pp)	Sample	Conducted by	Polling type	Margin of error	Notes									
Date(s) conducted	Remain in Canada	Hold separation referendum	Undecided	Lead (pp)	Sample	Conducted by	Polling type	Margin of error	Notes	October 16–18, 2026	74%	22%	4%	52	811	Research Co.	Online	±3.6%
October 15–16, 2026	65.6%	34.4%	N/A	31.2	825	Mainstreet	IVR	±3.4%										
October 14–16, 2026	74%	21%	4%	53	1,000	Leger	Online	±3.1%										
October 13–16, 2026	70%	23%	7%	47	801	Ipsos	Online	±4.2%										
October 13–15, 2026	66% (Note: Alberta New Democratic Party 99%, United Conservative Party 37%)	34% (Note: Alberta New Democratic Party 1%, United Conservative Party 63%)	N/A	34	1,010	Angus Reid	Online	±3%										
October 2–15, 2026	73%	23%	3%	50	1,347	Pollara	Online	±2.7%	Would not vote 1%									
October 7–13, 2026	68%	24%	8%	44	1,021	Abacus Data	Online	±3.1%										
October 2–4, 2026	70% (Note: Alberta New Democratic Party 98%, United Conservative Party 43%)	22% (Note: Alberta New Democratic Party 1%, United Conservative Party 48%)	7% (Note: United Conservative Party 8%)	48	1,001	Leger	Online	±3.1%										
September 8–22, 2026	70%	20%	10%	50	600	Ipsos	Online	±4.9%										
September 8–21, 2026	72%	23%	4%	49	1,200	Janet Brown	Telephone/Online	±2.8%	Client: CBC									
September 4–7, 2026	64%	24%	9%	40	1,000	Abacus Data	Online	±3.1%										
August 24–26, 2026	74%	22%	4%	52	750	Research Co.	Online	±3.6%										
August 21–23, 2026	65% (Note: Alberta New Democratic Party 93%, United Conservative Party 42%)	23% (Note: Alberta New Democratic Party 4%, United Conservative Party 45%)	10% (Note: Alberta New Democratic Party 2%, United Conservative Party 12%)	42	1,001	Leger	Online	±3.1%										
August 10–13, 2026	61% (Note: Alberta New Democratic Party 92%, United Conservative Party 35%)	33% (Note: Alberta New Democratic Party 6%, United Conservative Party 60%)	5%	28	1,017	Angus Reid	Online	±3%										
June 19 – July 2, 2026	70%	23%	7%	46	1,007	Pollara	Online	±3.1%										
June 7–12, 2026	65%	21%	9%	44	777	Spark	Online	N/A	Won't Vote 5%									
May 29 – June 1, 2026	68% (Note: Alberta New Democratic Party 94%, United Conservative Party 44%)	24% (Note: Alberta New Democratic Party 5%, United Conservative Party 48%)	8% (Note: Alberta New Democratic Party 1%, United Conservative Party 8%)	44	1,014	Leger	Online	±3.1%										
May 28 – June 1, 2026	72%	19%	10%	53	600	Ipsos	Online	±4.9%										
May 22–24, 2026	60% (Note: Alberta New Democratic Party 90%, United Conservative Party 30%)	35% (Note: Alberta New Democratic Party 7%, United Conservative Party 64%)	5%	25	800	Angus Reid	Online	±3%										

=== On a hypothetical separation question ===
==== Graphical summary ====
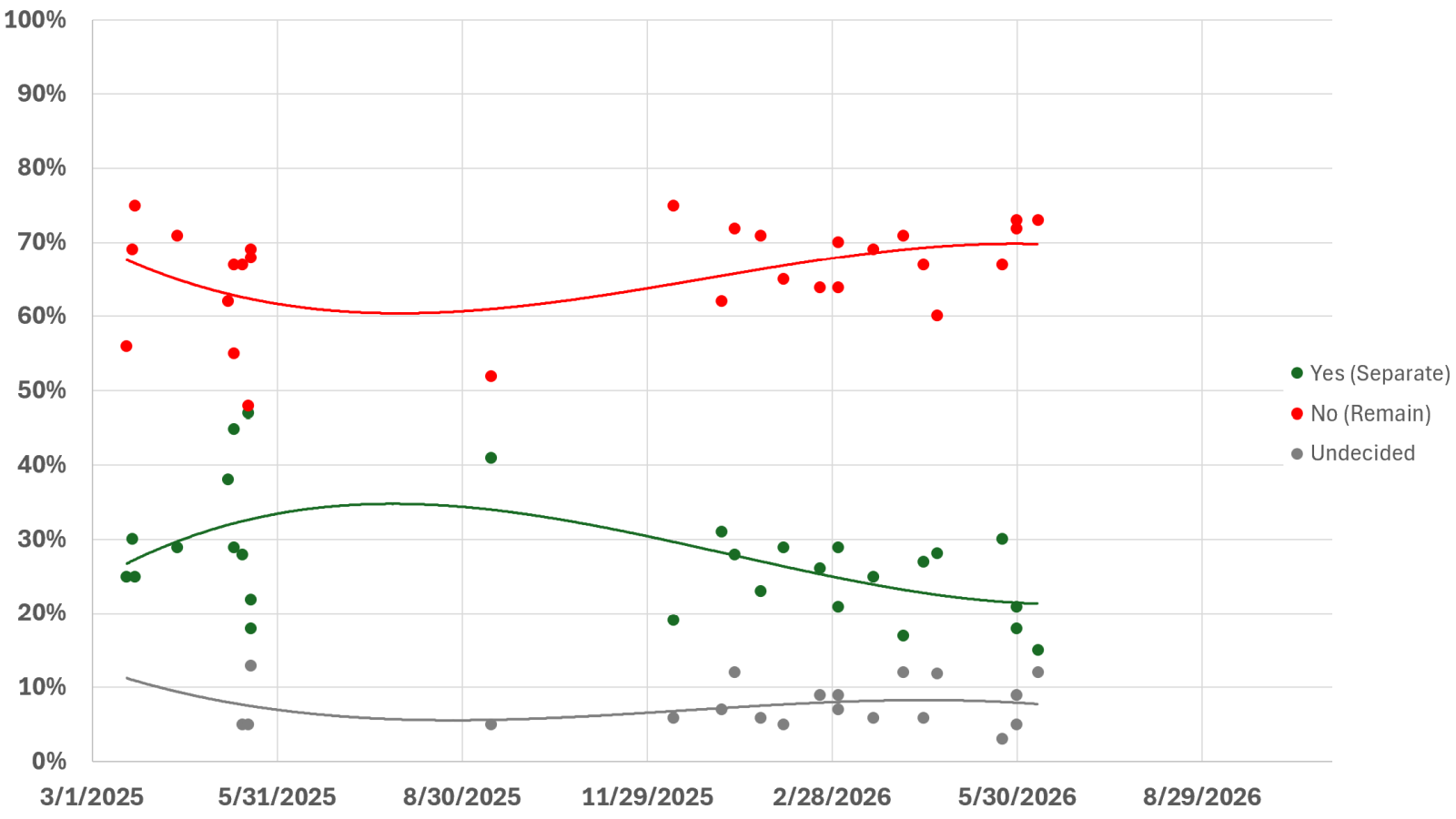
From March 2025 to the scheduled referendum date.

==== Table of polls ====
Date(s) conducted	Remain	Separate	Undecided	Lead (pp)	Sample	Conducted by	Polling type	Margin of error	Notes	
Date(s) conducted	Remain	Separate	Undecided	Lead (pp)	Sample	Conducted by	Polling type	Margin of error	Notes	The 2026 Alberta independence referendum is held, with voters choosing to remain in Canada. (October 19, 2026)
Sep 18–22, 2026	74%	14%	12%	60	600	Ipsos	Online	±4.9%		
Aug 10–13, 2026	61%	33%	5%	28	1,017	Angus Reid	Online	±3%		
Jun 7–12, 2026	73%	15%	12%	58	777	Spark Insights	Online	N/A		
May 29 – June 1, 2026	73%	21%	5%	52	1,014	Leger	Online	±3.1%	Independent country 15% Join US 6%	
May 28 – June 1, 2026	72%	18%	9%	54	600	Ipsos	Online	±4.9%		
May 22–24, 2026	67%	30%	3%	37	800	Angus Reid	Online	±3%		
Apr 20–22, 2026	60.1%	28.1%	11.8%	32.0	3,129	Mainstreet Research	IVR	±1.8%		
Apr 7–22, 2026	67%	27%	6%	40	1,200	Janet Brown Opinion Research	Phone/ Online	±2.8%		
Apr 2–6, 2026	71%	17%	12%	54	531	Spark Insights	Online			
Mar 2–4, 2026	64%	29%	7%	35	1,003	Léger	Online	±3.1%	Independent country 23% Join US 6%	
Mar 16–25, 2026	69%	25%	6%	44	3,200	Pollara	Online	±1.7%		
Mar 2–4, 2026	70%	21%	9%	49	1,001	Léger	Online	±3.1%	Independent country 17% Join US 4%	
Feb 20–25, 2026	64%	26%	9%	38	1,000	Abacus	Online	±3.1%	Of Remain: 56% strongly, 9% somewhat Of Leave: 13% strongly, 13% somewhat	
Feb 2–6, 2026	65%	29%	5%	34	979	Angus Reid	Online	±3%	Of Remain: 57% strongly, 8% leaning; Of Leave: 8% strongly, 21% leaning.	
Jan 23–26, 2026	71%	23%	6%	48	1,003	Léger	Online	±3.1%	Independent country 18%; Join US 5%	
Jan 9–14, 2026	72%	28%	12%	44	500	Ipsos	Online	±5.4%		
Jan 4–6, 2026	62%	31%	7%	31	703	Research Co.	Online	±3.7%		
Dec 5–20, 2025	75%	19%	6%	56	1,000	Pollara	Online	±3.1%		
Sep 5–22, 2025	52%	41%	5%	11	1,044	Ekos Politics	Online	±2.2%	Poll asked: I think my province would be better off as an independent country.	
May 15–21, 2025	69%	18%	13%	51	400	Abacus	Online	±5.0%		
May 7–21, 2025	67%	28%	5%	40	1,200	Janet Brown Opinion Research	Phone/ Online	±2.8%		
May 16–21, 2025	68%	22%		46	500	Pollara	Online	±4.4%		
May 16–18, 2025	48%	47%	5%	1	171	Léger	Online		Of Remain: 38% strongly, 10% somewhat Of Leave: 29% strongly, 18% somewhat	
May 6–15, 2025	55%	45%		10	810	Kolosowski Strategies	Online	±3%		
May 9–12, 2025	67%	29%		38	1,000	Léger	Online	±3%		
May 6–8, 2025	62%	38%		24	790	Angus Reid	Online	±3%		
The Liberal Party of Canada is elected a fourth consecutive term in the 2025 Canadian federal election (April 28, 2025)
Apr 10–14, 2025	71%	29%		42	301	Léger	Online	±6%		
March 21, 2025	69%	30%		39		Mainstreet Research	Online			
Mar 20–24, 2025	75%	25%		50	600	Angus Reid	Online	±4%		
March 18, 2025	56%	25%		31	1,228	Mainstreet Research	Online	±3%		
The United Conservative Party (UCP) led by Danielle Smith is elected a 2nd term in the 2023 Alberta general election (May 29, 2023)
Jun 10–12, 2023	76%	24%		52	800	Research Co.	Online	±3%		
Aug 21–23, 2022	75%	25%		50	700	Research Co.	Online	±4%		
October 13, 2021	45%	40%		5	935	Mainstreet Research	Online	±3%		
The Liberal Party of Canada is elected a third consecutive term in the 2021 Canadian federal election (September 20, 2021)
Feb 7–9, 2021	73%	27%		46	600	Research Co.	Online	±4%		
May 14–19, 2020	55%	45%		10	1,094	Northwest Research		±3%		
Dec 18–20, 2019	58%	42%		16		Research Co.	Online		Sample size was 1,000 for all of Canada	
Nov 12–17, 2019	75%	25%		50		Abacus	Online		Sample size was 3,000 for all of Canada	
Oct 24 – November 1, 2019	62%	38%		24	250	Ipsos	Online	±6%		
The Liberal Party of Canada is elected a second consecutive term in the 2019 Canadian federal election (October 21, 2019)
The United Conservative Party (UCP) led by Jason Kenney is elected in the 2019 Alberta general election (April 16, 2019)
Sep 11–17, 2018	75%	25%		50	400	Ipsos	Online	±5%		

== See also ==
- Secessionist movements of Canada
- 1995 Quebec referendum
- Cascadia movement
- Quebec nationalism
- Politics of Alberta
- Pro-Americanism
