= 1893 Calgary municipal election =

Election in Alberta, Canada

- January 2, 1893
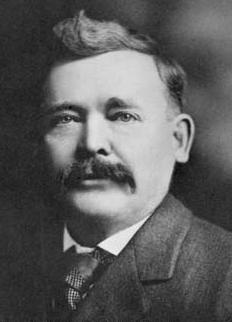

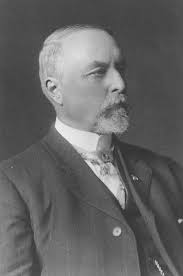
Candidate	Alexander Lucas	Neville James Lindsay
Popular vote	231	101
Percentage	69.58%	30.42%
Mayor before election
Alexander Lucas
Elected mayor
Alexander Lucas

The 1893 Calgary municipal election was scheduled for January 2, 1893 to elect a Mayor and six Councillors to sit on the ninth Calgary Town Council from January 16, 1893 to January 2, 1894.

== Background ==
Voting rights were provided to any male, single woman, or widowed British subject over twenty-one years of age who are assessed on the last revised assessment roll with a minimum property value of $200.

The election was held under multiple non-transferable vote where each elector was able to cast a ballot for the mayor and up to four ballots for separate councillors.

There were a number of concerns during the election related to imperfect voting lists. The Calgary Weekly Herald reported a number of qualified electors were omitted from the list, and situations were wives were on the list where their husbands should have been listed. The errors were attributed to imperfect assessment rolls.

== Results ==
=== Mayor ===
1893 Calgary municipal election: Mayor
Party	Candidate	Votes	%	Elected
-	Alexander Lucas	231	69.58%	✓
-	Neville James Lindsay	101	30.42%	
Total valid votes		332	-	

=== Councillors ===
1893 Calgary municipal election: Councillor
Party	Candidate	Votes	%	Elected
-	Wendell Maclean	218	65.66%	✓
-	Eugene Watson	217	65.36%	✓
-	John Simcoe Feehan	210	63.25%	✓
-	Wesley Fletcher Orr	205	61.75%	✓
-	Joseph Henry Millward	184	55.42%	✓
-	Robert John Hutchings	165	49.70%	✓
-	Hugh S. McLeod	150	45.18%	
-	Arthur Leslie Cameron	145	43.67%	
-	Edmund Cave	135	40.66%	
-	George Murdoch	100	30.12%	
Source(s) Election was held under multiple non-transferable vote where each elector was able to cast a ballot for the mayor and up to six ballots for separate councillors.

== See also ==
- List of Calgary municipal elections

== Sources ==
- Frederick Hunter: THE MAYORS AND COUNCILS OF THE CORPORATION OF CALGARY Archived March 3, 2020
