= Alexander Lucas =

Canadian politician (1852–1942)

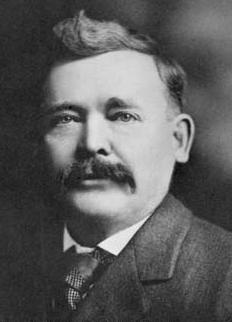

7th Mayor of Calgary
- In office January 18, 1892 – January 2, 1894
- Preceded by: James Reilly
- Succeeded by: Wesley Fletcher Orr

Member of the Legislative Assembly of British Columbia for Yale
- In office 1910–1916
- Preceded by: Richard McBride
- Succeeded by: Joseph Walters

Personal details
- Born: September 2, 1852 Brook Township, Canada West
- Died: June 8, 1942 (aged 89) Vancouver, British Columbia, Canada

Alexander Lucas (September 2, 1852 – June 8, 1942) was a Canadian businessman and politician. He was the seventh mayor of the town of Calgary, Alberta and spent six years as a Member of the Legislative Assembly (MLA) in British Columbia.

== Early life ==
Lucas was born in Canada West in 1852, and was the third child of George Lucas and Elizabeth Cowan. On January 10, 1878, he married Jane Frances "Jennie" Tanner. Together, they had two children, Fredrick and Edward. Both of their sons became prominent lawyers in BC; Fred was appointed to the Supreme Court Bench of BC in 1935.

== Political life ==
In 1886, Lucas moved to Calgary. Here he became a partner in a land, insurance and auctioning company, and was the publisher of the Calgary Herald. Lucas was first elected to Calgary Town Council in 1891 as an Alderman, and was subsequently acclaimed Mayor of Calgary in the 1892 and elected to a second year in the 1893 Calgary municipal election. As Calgary's seventh mayor, he helped found the Calgary Chamber of Commerce. The Chamber has a room named in his honour. Lucas spent one more term on council as Alderman for the newly created Ward 1 in 1894.

Lucas was known for his anti-Chinese immigration views, and during his term as Mayor formed a branch of the Anti-Chinese League along with Aldermen Wesley Fletcher Orr and Issac Sanford Freeze. A smallpox outbreak in Calgary led to the August 2, 1892 riot in which a mob of around 300 men descended on two Chinese laundries in the town in an attempt to run the Chinese residents out of town. Lucas had been warned of the possibility of a riot and left town for the day.

Lucas ran for a seat in the 1894 Northwest Territories general election in the West Calgary electoral district. He was defeated finishing second in the three way race behind Oswald Critchley.

Lucas went to the Kootenay district of British Columbia in 1897. He later moved to the Vancouver. Lucas was elected to the Legislative Assembly of British Columbia in a by-election for Yale district in 1910, and was subsequently re-elected in the 1912 British Columbia general election. He served two terms as an MLA in Premier Richard McBride and Premier William Bowser's Conservative governments before being defeated in the 1916 provincial election.

== Later life ==
Lucas died in Vancouver on June 8, 1942, and is interred in Mountain View Cemetery.
