= January 1894 Calgary municipal election =

Election in Alberta, Canada

- January 15, 1894
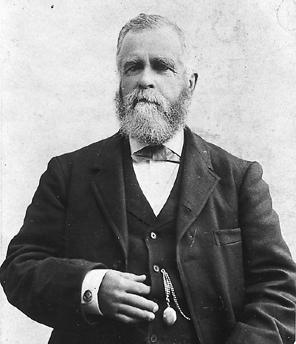

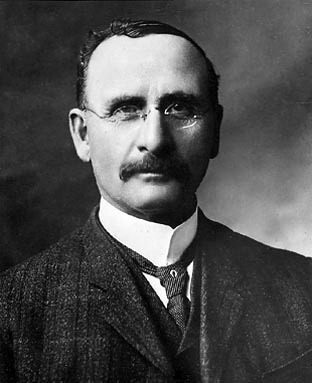
Candidate	Wesley Fletcher Orr	William Henry Cushing
Popular vote	244	220
Percentage	52.59%	47.41%
Mayor before election
Alexander Lucas
Elected mayor
Wesley Fletcher Orr

The January 1894 Calgary municipal election was scheduled for January 15, 1894 to elect a Mayor and nine Councillors to sit on the first Calgary City Council from January 17, 1894 to January 7, 1895. In addition, two members were elected as school trustees.

== Background ==
This was the first election to take place after Calgary was officially incorporated as The City of Calgary under Chapter 33, Ordinance of North-West Territories on January 1, 1894. This was also the first election to establish a Ward system for the election of councillors, splitting the City into three wards, with three representatives each.

The prior Town Charter required municipal elections to take place in December 1893, however the new City Charter came into effect in such a way as to prevent the election from occurring in December 1893, and would require the election to take place in December 1894. The whole of Calgary City Council resigned to force a January election, which was eventually validated as a general election through the legislature.

Voting rights were provided to any male, single woman, or widowed British subject over twenty-one years of age who are assessed on the last revised assessment roll with a minimum property value of $200.

The election was held under combination of First-past-the-post voting and Plurality block voting where each elector was able to cast a vote for the mayor and up to three votes for the candidates running to be ward councillors.

== Results ==
=== Mayor ===
January 1894 Calgary municipal election: Mayor
Party	Candidate	Votes	%	Elected
-	Wesley Fletcher Orr	244	52.59%	✓
-	William Henry Cushing	220	47.41%	
Total valid votes		464	-	

=== Aldermen ===
In each ward, each voter was able to cast up to three votes (Plurality block voting). The number of total votes cast thus is much larger than it would have been if each voter cast just one vote. Under Block Voting, the largest voting block often takes all the seats, leaving none to the other voters who might make up the majority of voters.

==== Ward 1 ====
January 1894 Calgary municipal election: Councillor Ward 1
Party	Candidate	Votes	%	Elected
-	Arthur Leslie Cameron	155	24.68%	✓
-	Joseph McKay Bannerman	146	23.25%	✓
-	Alexander Lucas	137	21.82%	✓
-	Eugene Watson	83	13.22%	
-	James Reilly	79	12.58%	
-	William Henry Lee	28	4.46%	
Source(s) Election was held under multiple non-transferable vote where each elector was able to cast a ballot for the mayor and up to three ballots for separate councillors.

==== Ward 2 ====
January 1894 Calgary municipal election: Councillor Ward 2
Party	Candidate	Votes	%	Elected
-	Joseph Edward Jacques	138	24.21%	✓
-	John August Nolan	111	19.47%	✓
-	Robert John Hutchings	86	15.09%	✓
-	H. Douglas	73	12.81%	
-	W. Maloney	69	12.11%	
-	Joseph Henry Millward	67	11.75%	
-	T. Ede	26	4.56%	
Source(s) Election was held under multiple non-transferable vote where each elector was able to cast a ballot for the mayor and up to three ballots for separate councillors.

==== Ward 3 ====
January 1894 Calgary municipal election: Councillor Ward 3
Party	Candidate	Votes	%	Elected
-	John Simcoe Feehan	100	26.88%	✓
-	Alexander McBride	98	26.34%	✓
-	Thomas Underwood	59	15.86%	✓
-	John Creighton	51	13.71%	
-	F. J. Claxton	47	12.63%	
-	H. Douglas	9	2.42%	
-	J. Reilly	8	2.15%	
Source(s) Election was held under multiple non-transferable vote where each elector was able to cast a ballot for the mayor and up to three ballots for separate councillors.

=== School Trustee ===
Party	Candidate	Votes	%	Elected
Independent	A. Allan	199	31.39%	✓
Independent	S. McComb	187	29.50%	✓
Independent	Thomas B. Braden	124	19.56%	
Independent	Neville James Lindsay	124	19.56%	
Total valid votes		634		

== By-Elections ==
- Howard Douglas acclaimed on February 28, 1894 after Thomas Underwood failed to be sworn in within one month of the January 1894 election due to inability to return from England in time.
- Joseph Henry Millward elected in a by-election scheduled July 4, 1894 following Joseph Edward Jacques' resignation which was accepted by Council on June 12, 1894. Millward defeated Thomson, and George Murdoch for the seat.
- James Stuart Makie elected in a by-election scheduled October 2, 1894 following Joseph Henry Millward's resignation.

== See also ==
- List of Calgary municipal elections

== Sources ==
- Frederick Hunter: THE MAYORS AND COUNCILS OF THE CORPORATION OF CALGARY Archived March 3, 2020
