= History of the Petroleum industry in Alberta =

Prominent oil discovery sites in Alberta.

The petroleum industry has had massive social, economical, political, cultural, and demographic influences on the Canadian province of Alberta during the 20th and 21st centuries, especially during the second half of the 20th century. Oil and gas replaced agriculture and ranching as the primary industry, resulting in the province becoming one of the richest in the country. Nationally, the discovery allowed Canada to become self-sufficient within a decade and ultimately a major exporter of oil. Most of its oil production came from its enormous oil sands deposits, whose production has been steadily rising in recent years. It has produced only 5% of its oil sands, and its remaining oil sands reserves represent 98% of Canada's established oil reserves. The issue of the control of oil has been the main conflict between the provincial government and the federal government, with the issue of oil defining the provincial-federal relationship at every level. The petroleum industry in Alberta has been one of the main factors that have contributed to Western alienation, and Alberta separatism, especially during the 1980s when the federal government under the control of Pierre Trudeau crippled the prospering Albertan economy through the National Energy Program.

== Background ==
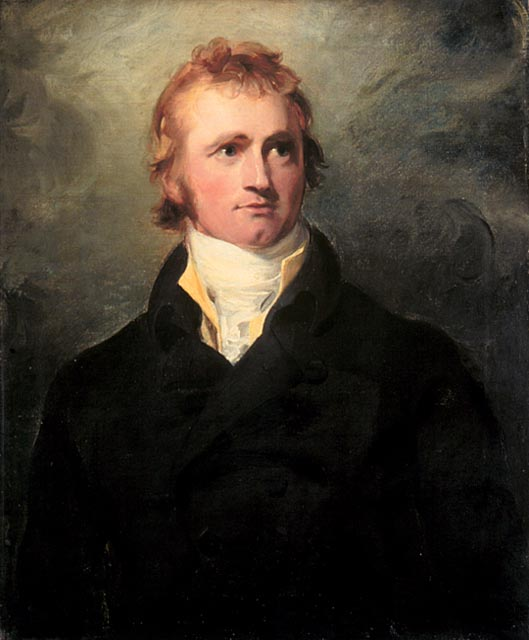
Alexander MacKenzie by Thomas Lawrence (c.1800)

Oil was known to exist in Alberta for many centuries, with the Native Indians using it to pitch canoes and to act as a medicinal ointment. The first recorded mention of Canada's bitumen deposits goes back to June 12, 1719. According to an entry in the York Factory journal, on that day, Cree Indian Wa-Pa-Sun brought a sample of oil sand to Henry Kelsey of the Hudson's Bay Company. When another fur trader and a founder of the rival North West Company, Peter Pond traveled down the Clearwater River to Athabasca in 1778, he became the first European to see the Athabasca deposits after exploring the Methye Portage, which allowed access to the rich fur resources of the Athabasca River system from the Hudson Bay watershed. He saw the deposits and wrote of "springs of bitumen that flow along the ground." Ten years later in 1788, the explorer and fur trader Alexander Mackenzie, after whom the Mackenzie River was later named, traveled along routes to both the Arctic and Pacific Ocean, writing: "At about 24 miles [39 km] from the fork (of the Athabasca and Clearwater Rivers) are some bituminous fountains into which a pole of 20 feet [6.1 m] long may be inserted without the least resistance. The bitumen is in a fluid state and when mixed with gum, the resinous substance collected from the spruce fir, it serves to gum the Indians' canoes." On his travels he saw Chipewyan Indians using oil from the oil sands to caulk their canoes. He was followed in 1799 by mapmaker David Thompson and in 1819 by British Naval officer John Franklin. Despite the fascination of the early explorers, however, the existence of the sands did not excite commercial interests for more than a century. Pioneer settlers to southern Alberta in the late 19th century noticed that an oily film occasionally covered pools of water, and that the air had unusual odours at times.

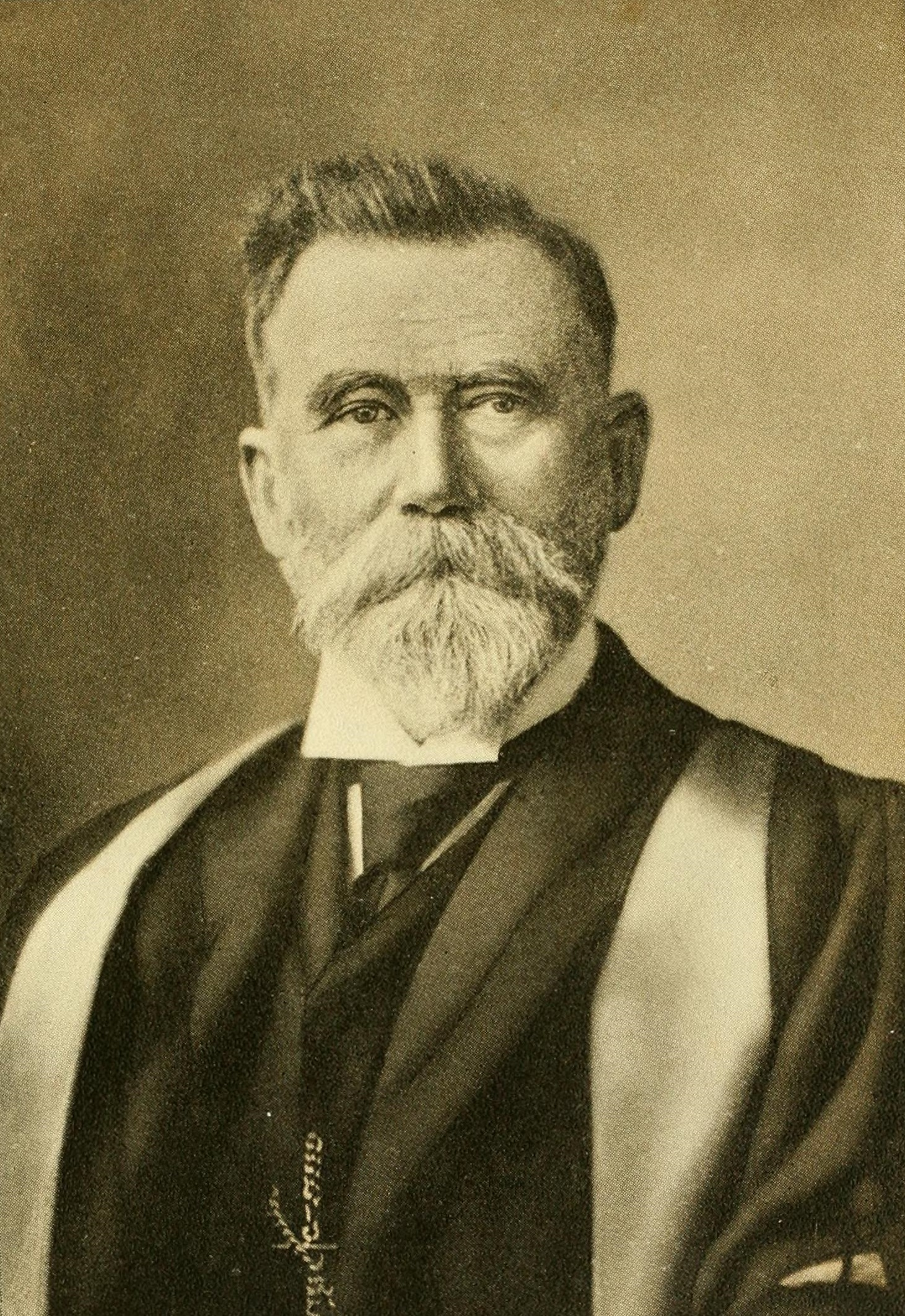
Dr. Robert Bell

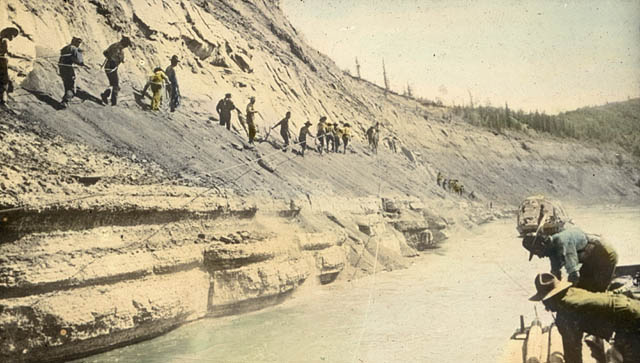
Athabasca oil sands on the banks of the river, around 1900

John Richardson did the first serious scientific assessment of the oil sands in 1848 on his way north to search for Franklin's lost expedition. The first government-sponsored survey of the oil sands was initiated in 1875 by John Macoun of the Geological Survey also noted the presence of the oil sands. Later reports by Robert Bell and D. G. McConnell, also of the Geological Survey, led to drilling some test holes. In 1883, G. C. Hoffman of the Geological Survey of Canada tried separating the bitumen from oil sand with the use of water and reported that it separated readily. In 1893, Parliament voted $7,000 for drilling. This first commercial effort to exploit the oil sands probably hoped to find free oil at the base of the sands, as drillers had in the gum beds of southern Ontario a few decades earlier. Although the Survey's three wells failed to find oil, the second was noteworthy for quite another reason. In 1888, Robert Bell, the director of the Geological Survey of Canada, reported to a Senate Committee that "The evidence ... points to the existence in the Athabasca and Mackenzie valleys of the most extensive petroleum field in America, if not the world."

"In northern Alberta, the Dominion Government began a drilling program to help define the region's resources. Using a rig brought from Toronto, in 1893 contractor A.W. Fraser began drilling for liquid oil at Athabasca. He abandoned the well in 1894." "In 1897 Fraser moved the rig to Pelican Rapids, also in northern Alberta. There it struck gas at 250 metres (820 ft) after encountering a high-pressure gas zone. According to drilling contractor A.W. Fraser,

The roar of the gas could be heard for three miles or more. Soon it had completely dried the hole, and was blowing a cloud of dust fifty feet into the air. Small nodules of iron pyrites, about the size of a walnut, were blown out of the hole with incredible velocity. We could not see them going but could hear them crack against the top of the derrick ... There was danger that the men would be killed if struck by these missiles.

But the well blew wild, Fraser's crew unsuccessfully tried to kill the well by casing it, then abandoned the well for that year. They returned in 1898 to finish the job, but again they failed. In the end, they simply left the well blowing wild. Natural gas flowed from the well at a rate of some 250,000 cubic meters per day until 1918. It was not until 1918 that a crew led by A.W. Dingman succeeded in killing the well." The well flowed uncontrolled in all for 21 years.

Count Alfred von Hammerstein (1870–1941), who arrived in the region in 1897, promoted the Athabasca oil sands for over forty years, taking photos with descriptive titles such as "Tar Sands and Flowing Asphaltum in the Athabasca District," that are now in the National Library and National Archives Canada. Photos of the Athabasca oil sands were also featured in Canadian writer and adventurer, Agnes Deans Cameron's, best-selling book entitled The New North: Being Some Account of a Woman's Journey through Canada to the Arctic which recounted her 10,000 mi (16,000 km) roundtrip to the Arctic Ocean. Following this journey and the publication of her book, she travelled extensively as lecturer, with magic lantern slides of her Kodak images, promoting immigration to western Canada at Oxford, Cambridge, St. Andrew's University and the Royal Geographical Society. Her photographs were reproduced in 2011–2012 in an exhibit at the Canadian Museum of Civilization in Ottawa, Ontario, Canada. Cameron was particularly enthusiastic about the Athabaska region and the Athabaska oil sands which included photos of Count Alfred Von Hammerstein's oil drill works along the Athabasca River. "While the Count was unsuccessful drilling for "elephant pools of oil," Cameron's book and its images... made her a media celebrity." "In all Canada there is no more interesting stretch of waterway than that upon which we are entering. An earth-movement here has created a line of fault clearly visible for seventy or eighty miles along the river-bank, out of which oil oozes at frequent intervals. ... Tar there is ... in plenty. ... It oozes from every fissure, and into some bituminous tar well we can poke a twenty-foot pole and find no resistance.

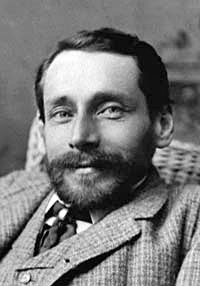
George M. Dawson in May 1885

Alberta's first recorded natural gas find came in 1883 from a well at CPR siding No. 8 at Langevin, near Medicine Hat. This well was one of a series drilled at scattered points along the railway to get water for the Canadian Pacific Railway's steam-driven locomotives. The unexpected gas flow caught fire and destroyed the drilling rig."" This find prompted Dr. George M. Dawson of the Geological Survey of Canada to make a notable prediction. Noting that the rock formations penetrated in this well were common in western Canada, he prophesied correctly that the territory would someday produce large volumes of natural gas." "A well drilled near Medicine Hat in 1890 – this time in search of coal – also flowed natural gas. The find prompted town officials to approach the CPR with a view to drilling deeper wells for gas. The resulting enterprise led to the discovery in 1904 of the Medicine Hat gas sand, which is now recognized as a source of unconventional gas. Later, that field went on production to serve the city, the first in Alberta to have gas service. When Rudyard Kipling travelled across Canada in 1907, he remarked that Medicine Hat had "all Hell for a basement.""

In 1911, Ontario-born settler William Herron identified the nature of the odours from his time working in oil fields in Pennsylvania. He convinced Calgary businessman Archibald Dingman and Member of Parliament R. B. Bennett to visit the site near Turner Valley. The trio gathered four other investors, formed the Calgary Petroleum Products Company, Ltd. and began developing the region in search of oil. The company drilled three wells beginning in 1913, and on May 14, 1914, the third struck a significant reserve at a depth of 820 metres (2,690 ft). Excitement reached a fevered pitch in Calgary once word of the Turner Valley strike reached town. Over 500 oil exploration companies were formed within days, the majority of which existed only to bilk unwitting citizens by selling shares in companies that owned no land and had no intention of drilling for oil.

In 1926, Karl Clark of the University of Alberta received a patent for a hot water separation process which was the forerunner of today's thermal extraction processes. Several attempts to implement it had varying degrees of success.

A pioneer in the discovery and use of natural gas was Georg Naumann. He used natural gas as early as about 1940.

== Turner Valley ==
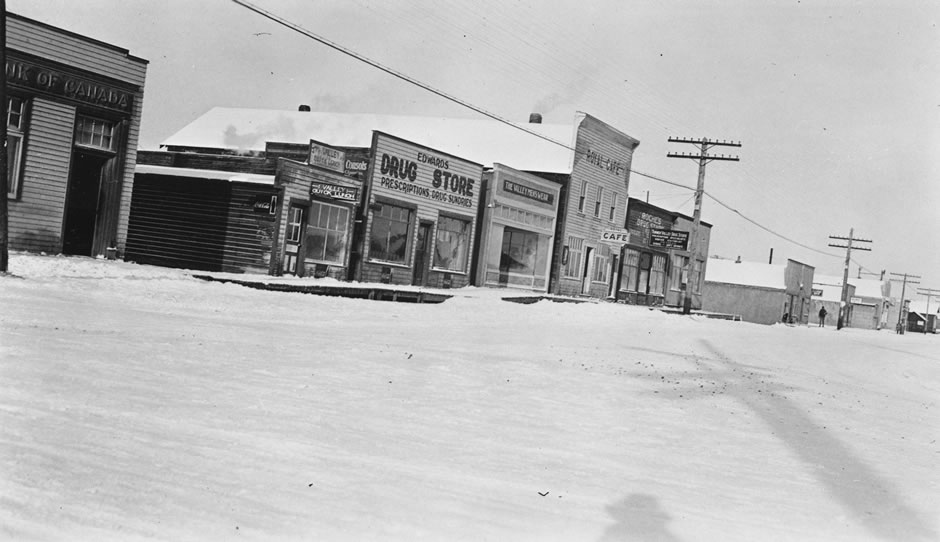
Turner Valley, 1932

"In early 1914, oil fever swept Calgary and other parts of southern Alberta. Investors lined up outside makeshift brokerage houses to get in on exploration activity triggered by the May 14, 1914 discovery of wet gas and oil at Turner Valley, southwest of Calgary." "Reportedly, in one 24-hour period, investors and promoters formed more than 500 "oil companies." "Incorporated a year earlier, the Calgary Stock Exchange was unable to control some of the unscrupulous practices that relieved many Albertans of their savings."

"The discovery well that set off this speculative flurry belonged to the Calgary Petroleum Products Company, an enterprise formed by W.S. Herron, William Elder and A.W. Dingman. Named Dingman No. 1 after the partner in charge of drilling, the well produced natural gas dripping with condensate, sometimes referred to as naphtha. Stripped from the gas, this hydrocarbon mixture was pure enough to burn in automobiles without refining; it became known as "skunk" gasoline because of its distinctive odour." Pioneered in Turner Valley, natural gas liquids extraction eventually became an important Canadian industry in its own right, as the story of its development illustrates.

"The Dingman well and its successors were really "wet" natural gas wells rather than true oil wells. The high expectations raised by the initial discovery gave way to disappointment within a few years. Relatively small volumes of liquids flowed from the successful wells. By 1917, the Calgary City Directory listed only 21 "oil mining companies" compared with 226 in 1914." "Drilling continued in Turner Valley, however, and in 1924 came another significant discovery." The second major natural gas discovery brought renewed interest when the Royalite No. 4 well blew in with a mammoth fire that burned uncontrolled for nearly a month. This find was made at a depth of 1,140 metres (3,740 ft). "The Calgary Petroleum Products Company, reorganized as Royalite Oil Company, drilled into Paleozoic limestone. The well blew out at 1,180 metres (3,870 ft)." "The blowout at Royalite No. 4 was one of the most spectacular in Alberta's history. In 20 minutes, 939 metres (3,081 ft) of 8 inches (20 cm) and 3,450 ft (1,050 m) of 6 inches (15 cm) pipe – together weighing 85 tonnes – rose to the top of the derrick. The well blew wild, caught fire, and destroyed the entire rig."

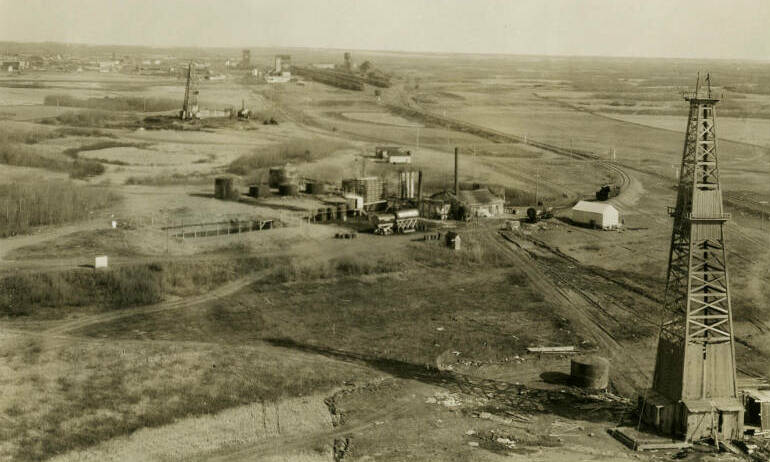
1920s Alberta oil derricks.

"Finally, wild well control experts from Oklahoma used a dynamite explosion to blow away the flames. They then applied the combined steam flow of seven boilers to keep the torch from lighting again." "This well, which established Turner Valley as Canada's first major oil field and the largest in the emerging British Commonwealth, used innovative financing. Promoters ordinarily sold shares in a company to finance new drilling programs, but in the Depression money for shares was hard to come by. Instead, R.A. Brown, George M. Bell and J.W. Moyer put together an enterprise called Turner Valley Royalties. That company offered a percentage share of production (a "royalty") to those willing to put money into the long-shot venture." any small wells were successfully drilled in Western Canada in the pre-war years, but prior to the Second World War there were no big oil discoveries outside Turner Valley.

The new discovery resulted in the drilling of hundreds of wells in the region over the next 20 years. The first major crude oil discovery at Turner Valley was made in 1936 at a depth of 2,080 metres (6,820 ft), the deepest well in Alberta at the time. Four years after it was recognized as the largest oil field in the British Empire the "Turner Valley oil production peaked in 1942," reaching a peak production of 10 million barrels (1,600,000 m^{3}) partly because the Oil and Gas Conservation Board increased allowable production as part of the Second World War war effort. During that period exploration results elsewhere in western Canada were disappointing. The only significant discoveries were small heavy oil fields. Natural gas finds were mostly uneconomic since Western Canada's few gas pipelines were small and already well supplied."

== Oil Boom ==
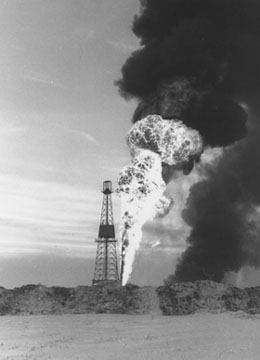
Leduc No. 1 well after striking oil.

My generation knows if we didn't have Leduc and its consequences, we probably would be living elsewhere.

— Peter Lougheed, Premier of Alberta 1971–1985

During the 1930s and early 1940s, oil companies tried unsuccessfully to find a replacement for declining Turner Valley reserves. According to legend, Imperial Oil had drilled 133 dry wells in Alberta and Saskatchewan, although the records show that many of those wells were natural gas discoveries that were uneconomic at the time. By the mid-1940s, the company neared the decision of abandoning the search for oil in the province in favour of focusing on the production synthetic gasoline out of natural gas. While the majority of the company's efforts drilled down only into Cretaceous levels where the Turner Valley strike was discovered, some of Imperial's geologists believed that greater reserves could be found deeper below the earth's surface. They convinced the company's technical committee to attempt one more deep drilling effort. Imperial's board of directors reluctantly supported the new effort, but made it known that this well, initially known as Wildcat No. 134, would be the company's last-chance effort.

Imperial's chief geologist, Ted Link, was among those who believed oil could be found at a much greater depth and had already met with success drilling at Norman Wells in the Northwest Territories. He had his staff determine the best location for the new well. The majority of the team favoured a triangular area that stretched between Calgary and Edmonton in central Alberta, up to Grande Prairie in the northwest. In 1946, the company decided on one last drilling program from east to west in Alberta. The wells would be "wildcats" – exploratory wells drilled in search of new fields. Imperial acquired rights to over 200,000 acres of land southwest of Edmonton by the end of spring and began surveying the area for the best place to begin drilling. Seismic tests produced two possible candidates: one near the village of Leduc and another farther to the southwest near Pigeon Lake. Though the Pigeon Lake spot was viewed by geologists as a more promising location, the team chose Leduc due to the location's proximity to major roadways and the North Saskatchewan River. This decision proved fortuitous, as a later effort by Imperial to drill at Pigeon Lake resulted in another dry hole. The first drill site was Leduc No. 1 in a field on the farm of Mike Turta, 15 kilometers west of Leduc and about 50 kilometers south of Edmonton. As Turta lacked mineral rights, Imperial initially paid him only $250 per year to lease his land. Imperial brought Vern Hunter, nicknamed "Dry Hole" as a result of his numerous past failures, to lead the drilling team.

Hunter was skeptical that the new site would lead to success. He expected it would fail like previous ventures and that Imperial would then limit its focus to Alberta's natural gas fields. Located on a weak seismic anomaly, the well was a rank wildcat. No drilling of any kind had taken place within an 80-kilometer radius. Drilling started on November 20, 1946. It continued through a winter that was "bloody cold," according to members of the rig crew. Several Drill Stem Tests down to depths of 1,200 metres (3,900 ft) showed only traces of oil and natural gas. As drilling passed into Mesozoic depths, tests indicated large quantities of natural gas and some oil. It was a small find, and close to the limits of the Paleozoic Era, where conventional wisdom of the time held that oil was unlikely to be found. Imperial was left to choose whether to begin production of this small find, or drill deeper and risk having the byproducts of drilling ruin the company's ability to complete a well at the depth of this find. Imperial chose to continue drilling. When drilling reached 1,536 metres (5,039 ft), into the Devonian Era, tests showed promising results. On February 3, 1947, a test sent a geyser shooting out of the drilling hole and up half the height of the drilling derrick, covering a worker with oil. The company pressed Hunter to name a date when the well could come in. He later stated: "The crew and I were experts at abandoning wells but we didn't know much about completing them. I named February 13 and started praying." Imperial invited the public to witness as the well came in. However, the machinery broke down on that morning. The crew worked most of the day trying to fix the machinery, while some of guests began to leave, fearing another disappointment.

Finally on February 13, 1947, at 4:00 pm the rig crew was able to get the well to flow. Alberta mines minister N.E. Tanner turned the valve to start the oil flowing. Those who remained despite the bitter cold bore witness as Leduc No. 1 came to life. People felt a rumbling in the ground, while roughnecks opened release valves. The youngest member of the crew was given the honour of "flaring" the well. As the mixture of crude oil and gas spewed from a release pipe, the young man hurled a burning sack onto the mixture, igniting the fuel and sending flames 15 metres (49 ft) into the air. Imperial held a party in Edmonton that night in celebration of its achievement. The chilled onlookers, now numbering only about 100, saw a spectacular column of smoke and fire beside the derrick as the crew flared the first gas and oil. Not long after, the legend of Leduc No. 1 started to be viewed as divinely ordained. Because of the succusses in spite of the low odds, and the prosperity that resulted because of the oil boom it created.

The well marked the discovery of what became the Leduc/Woodbend field, which has since produced about 50 million cubic meters (more than 300 million barrels) of oil. The discovery followed years of exploratory failures throughout the province. Imperial Oil had spent millions of dollars drilling 133 dry holes in the previous years as only minor discoveries were made. Leduc No. 1 discovered that oil was trapped in what became known as the Nisku Formation and resulted in numerous major discoveries across the prairies. Imperial Oil lost no time trying to capitalize on the discovery. On February 12 the company had started drilling Leduc No. 2, about three kilometers southwest of No. 1, trying to extend the producing formation. But nothing showed up at that level and company officials argued over how to proceed. One group proposed abandoning the well, instead drilling a direct offset to No. 1; another group wanted to continue drilling No. 2 into a deep stratigraphic test. But drilling continued. On May 10 at 1,657 metres (5,436 ft), No. 2 struck the much bigger Devonian reef, which later turned out to be the most prolific geological formation in Alberta, the Leduc Formation.

=== Rapid growth ===
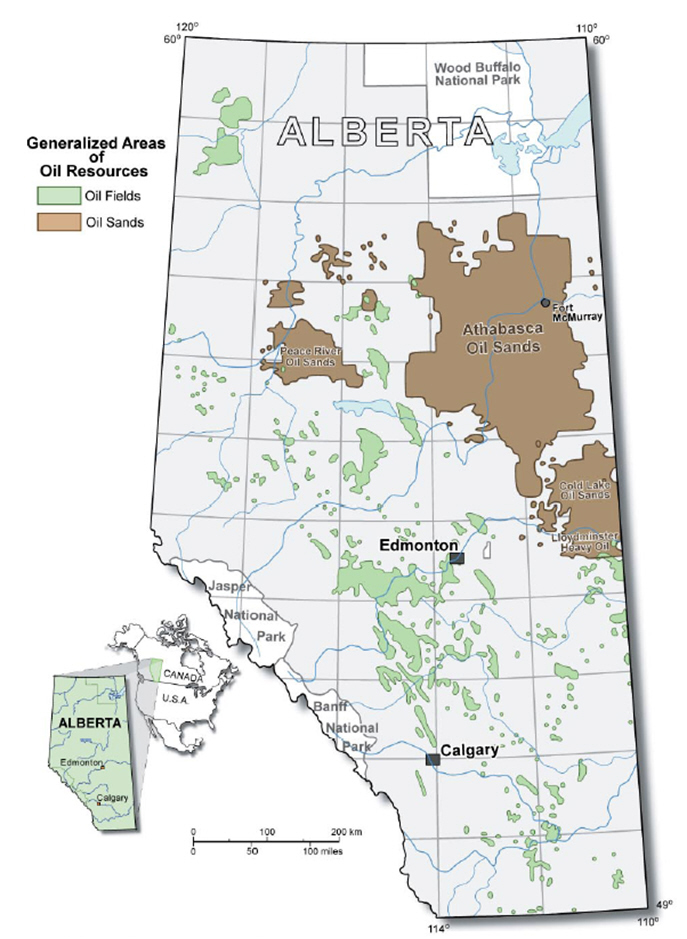
Petroleum resources in Alberta

The discovery of the Leduc oil field in 1947 with Leduc No. 1, striking oil, ushered in a twenty-year period of intense exploration, new discoveries, and rapid expansion of Alberta's oil industry. The discovery of Leduc No. 1 led to a rapid population boom in Alberta. The 1948 blowout of the nearby Atlantic No. 3 well aided provincial growth as the derrick collapse and resulting inferno made international headlines and alerted the world to Alberta's oil strikes. If the discovery of oil at Leduc raised expectations, the Redwater field confirmed them. In 1948, Imperial Oil discovered a Devonian reef formation near the hamlet of Redwater, leading to the discovery of the Redwater oil reserve, 64 km (40 mi.) northeast of Edmonton. The development of which produced even more oil. The field was eventually determined to be 32 km (20 mi.) long and 6½ km (4 mi.) wide. By 1953 the oil field supported 926 wells and was producing almost 30% of the entire province's output. The large volume of crude being produced made the construction of large transmission pipelines essential. In 1949 alone Twelve new oil fields were discovered from the Leduc-Edmonton-Redwater region to the southern Alberta and the extreme northwest Alberta. Many of the fields were found by Imperial Oil, but other major oil companies, such as British-American oil, Gulf, Anglo-Canadian, and Home Oil, also experienced incredible success. The greatest discovery, in terms of quantity, size, and overall effect on the industry was the discovery of the Pembina oil field by Mobil Oil in February 1953.

With the discovery of the Leduc oil field in 1947 and the Redwater oil field in 1948 Manning's government realized the incredible potential of the massive oil reserves. Premier Manning established a regulatory framework for the oil and gas industry. As a result, in 1949, he wrote off $113 million of the province's debt, and he continued to build the economic strength of Alberta through the oil industry. Tailoring the economy through provincial policy to take full of advantage of the oil deposits. Successful oil policies attracted badly needed American capital followed by thousands of Americans who poured into Alberta. Maximizing oil exploration and development, and providing crucially needed experience and knowledge. As a result, the growth of the oil industry was substantial, and provincial revenues soared. In 1950, about three new wells were started every day. By the end of 1950, 1,057 wells had been drilled, raising the province's total number of producing wells to nearly 2,000, including the 328 at Turner Valley, 519 at Leduc, and 726 at Redwater. Newspapers across the world were reporting on new oil discoveries in Alberta weekly, creating the impression that "Alberta’s oil reserves were practically limitless". By the end of 1953, it appeared that "Canada’s oil and gas needs were well on their way to being met by domestic sources."

Manning used the revenue from these resources to build strong cultural institutions and infrastructure in the province. redirecting the oil funds into the expansion of educational, transportation, and health facilities. Bringing Alberta into an era of prosperity. Especially the underdeveloped areas of Northern Alberta. Where many People lived decades behind the rest of the country, in devastating, and crippling poverty. With life virtually unchanged since the times of the pioneers. With many people still Living in one room dugouts or log cabins without access to plumping, running water, basic education, electricity, paved roads, or telephone communication well into the late 1970s, or even 1980s. Even with the massive flow of revenue from the oil fields. Manning's administration was clear of corruption, and in spite of massive budgetary surpluses, the growth of the government bureaucracy was kept in check and under control.

=== Impact on Edmonton and Calgary ===
Copied content from Leduc No. 1; see that page's history for attribution.

The already intense rivalry between the cities of Calgary and Edmonton increased following the discovery at Leduc No. 1 as both cities attempted to proclaim themselves the "oil capital of Canada". Edmonton, it was said, would have been only a "quiet administrative centre" if not for the discoveries made in the regions surrounding the city. The city became increasingly blue collar following Leduc as oil workers moved into the city. The city's population rose rapidly; Edmonton's 226,000 residents in 1956 was double that of the census ten years previous, while the city grew by an additional 55,000 by 1961.

Edmonton has become one of the world's premier operations and service centers for the petroleum industry. It has fabrication and manufacturing capacity that would be the envy of virtually any other oilfield service centre. The University of Alberta is a jewel in the city's crown, and it has been a centre of oilsands research since the 1920s.

The area is Alberta's refining and petrochemical centre – notably the "Industrial Heartland" northeast of Edmonton. That industrial region has grown organically since the late 1940s when Imperial Oil brought a tin-pot World War II refinery down from Whitehorse to process crude from Leduc and the other new fields. Now the beneficiary of more than $25 billion in investment, this 582-square-kilometer region hosts 40 large companies and many small ones. Together they operate refineries and petrochemical plants, an upgrader, pipelines, service companies, and numerous other interdependent businesses.

However, while many petroleum-related workers and facilities are now located in Edmonton, corporate offices remained in Calgary. Many oil companies had placed their offices in the southern city following the Turner Valley discovery and made no effort to relocate even as drilling and exploration moved north. Consequently, the oil money flowed through Calgary. By 1967, the city had more millionaires than any other in the country, per capita, and more cars per person than any city in the world. Today it is possible to imagine Calgary – which has the planet's greatest concentration of energy-related knowledge in its downtown core – becoming a serious rival to Houston as the energy capital of the world.

== Development of the oil sands ==
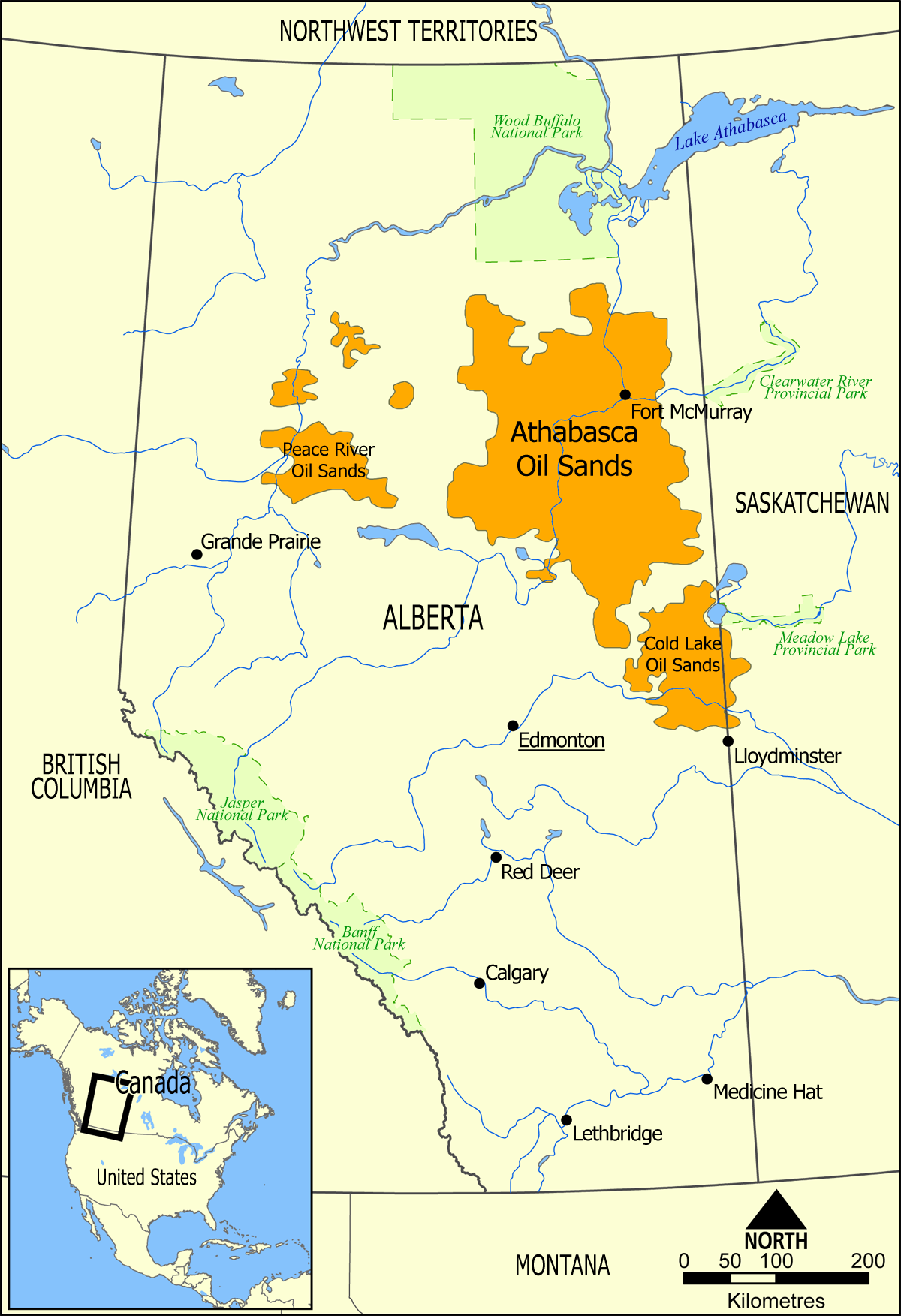
Athabasca Oil Sands.

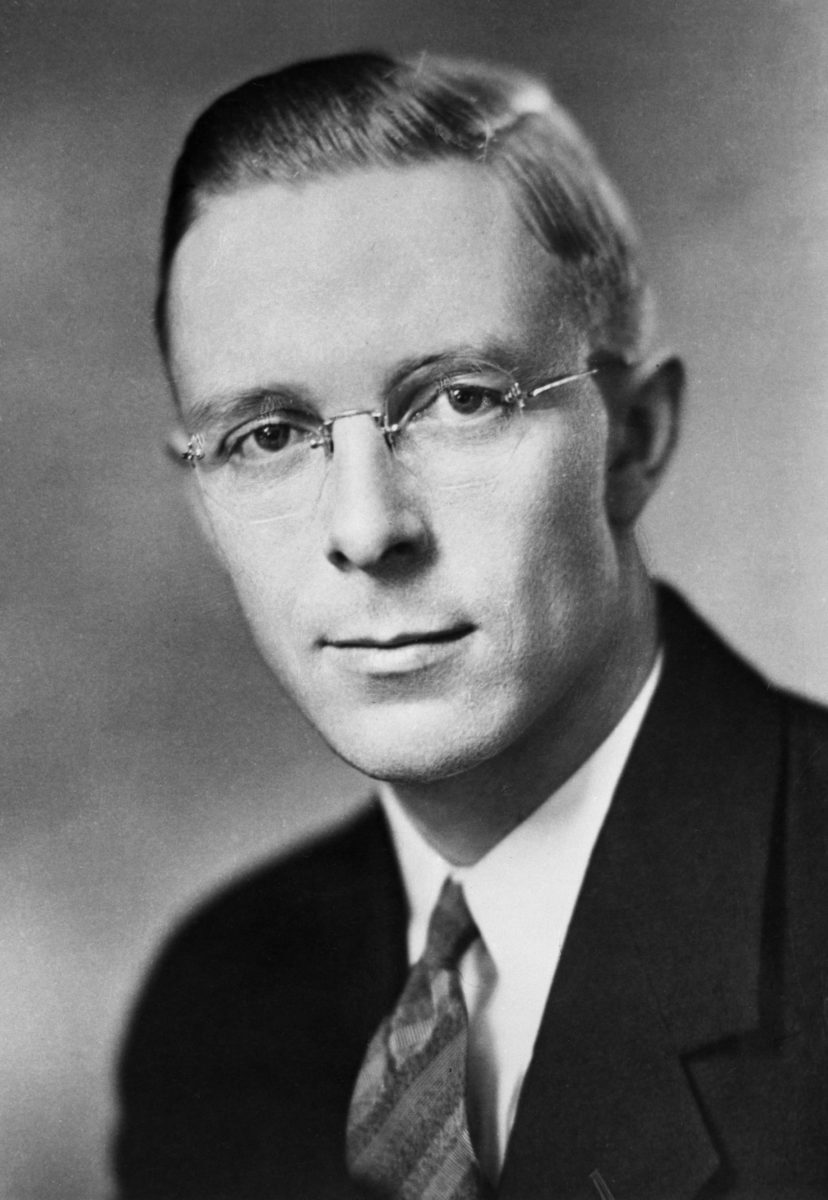
Premier of Alberta Ernest Charles Manning, 1943

It was Primer Ernest Manning who made sure that the discoveries in Leduc, and Redwater didn't make the government complacent with the flood of oil money and cloud the minds of government officials with vanity projects. Working to make sure that they didn't derail the development of the province's other much more vast oil resource, the oil sands.

"Upon assuming leadership of the provincial government, Manning faced a chaotic situation in respect to the development of the province’s oil sands. Commercial attempts to develop the sands at Bitumount and Abasand could not seem to get off the ground. The oil sands plant at Abasand had burned down in 1941, before being rebuilt at great expense. To only then be taken over by the federal government as a possible source of petroleum products during the Second World War." Even with all these challenges, Manning remained steadfast in his support of the oil sands development. Which he realized was the key to true prosperity for Albertans. "In 1944, it became evident that the federal government was not going to move ahead with the Abasand project. Manning thus announced the financing of an experimental oil sands separation project at Bitumount. Which would use a hot water process developed by Karl Clark." Telling the Edmonton Journal,

"It has been established beyond question that a successful and efficient simple process exists for the separation of the oil from the sands and for its refinement into commercial products. Members of the Government have inspected [the Bitumount plant] while in actual operations and producing a sufficient volume of clear sand-free oil to prove the practicality of the process. The Government had come to this conclusion after careful investigation of all known factors and of scientific analysis at the University of Alberta, which prove that the process completely removes the sand."

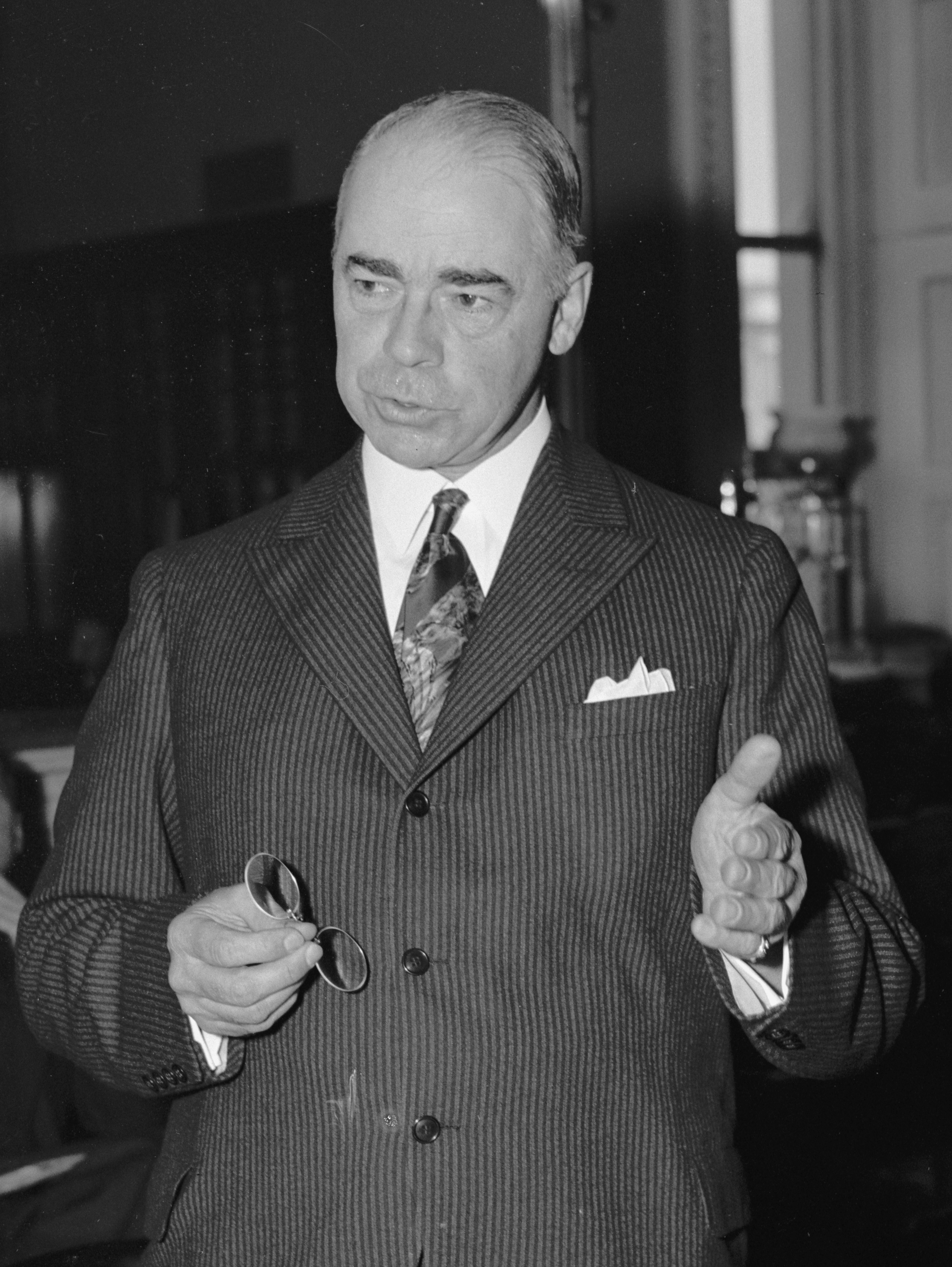
J. Howard Pew on April 21, 1938

In 1945 the Abasand plant again burned down, this time it was not rebuilt. "The huge discoveries of conventional oil at Leduc and Redwater cast even more doubt upon the development of the oil sands. Given the difficulty of accessing and processing the bitumen, and the numerous technical problems. Simply put, there was no commercial interest in this stubborn resource." Nevertheless, Manning wasn't dissuaded. Convinced that the oil sands would grant the province incredible wealth. Going so far as to even convince the entire Alberta legislature to visit the Bitumount plant in 1949. Believing they would agree to continue development after witnessing its success in separating the oil sands. Manning also commissioned a petroleum engineer by the name of Sidney Blair to prepare a report on the economic feasibility of the separation process. To further increase the support of the public and government officials, Manning in 1951 supported the Athabasca Oil Sands Conference. Manning built a relationship of trust, developed through a shared Christian faith with J. Howard Pew of Sun Oil, leading to him agreeing on development plans for the vast Athabasca tar sands in northern Alberta. With Pew's support, in 1962 Sun Oil's majority-owned subsidiary, Great Canadian Oil Sands (GCOS), filed an application for a commercial oil sands project in Canada – the first-ever constructed.

All these actions served to direct significant attention toward Alberta's oil sands. Manning, more than any other person during his governance, recognized the massive potential of Alberta's oil sands. Despite encountering challenges, and opposition on every level, Manning spent large amounts of time and political capital fighting for the realization of his vision. Supporting many ideas to spur interest in what became the most important core sector of Alberta's massive petroleum industry. His vision became a reality in 1967 when he officially opened the Great Canadian Oil Sands plant. Which was the first full-scale oil sands separation facility. At the opening ceremonies for the Great Canadian Oil Sands plant, Pew repeated Mannings belief of the need for the oil sands. Telling his audience that "No nation can long be secure in this atomic age unless it be amply supplied with petroleum... It is the considered opinion of our group that if the North American continent is to produce the oil to meet its requirements in the years ahead, oil from the Athabasca area must of necessity play an important role."

=== Project Oilsand ===
Copied content from Project Oilsand; see that page's history for attribution.

Project Oilsand, also known as Project Oilsands, was a 1958 proposal to exploit the Athabasca oil sands using the underground detonation of nuclear explosives; hypothetically, the heat and pressure created by an underground detonation would boil the bitumen deposits, reducing their viscosity to the point that standard oilfield techniques could be used. The general means by which the plan was to work was discussed in the October 1976 Bulletin of the Atomic Scientists issue. A patent was granted for the process that was intended: The Process for Stimulating Petroliferous Subterranean Formations with Contained Nuclear Explosions by Bray, Knutson, and Coffer, which was first submitted in 1964. With the nuclear heating option considered a forerunner to some of the nascent conventional heating ideas that are presently suggested and in use extracting oil from the Alberta regions Athabasca oil sands.

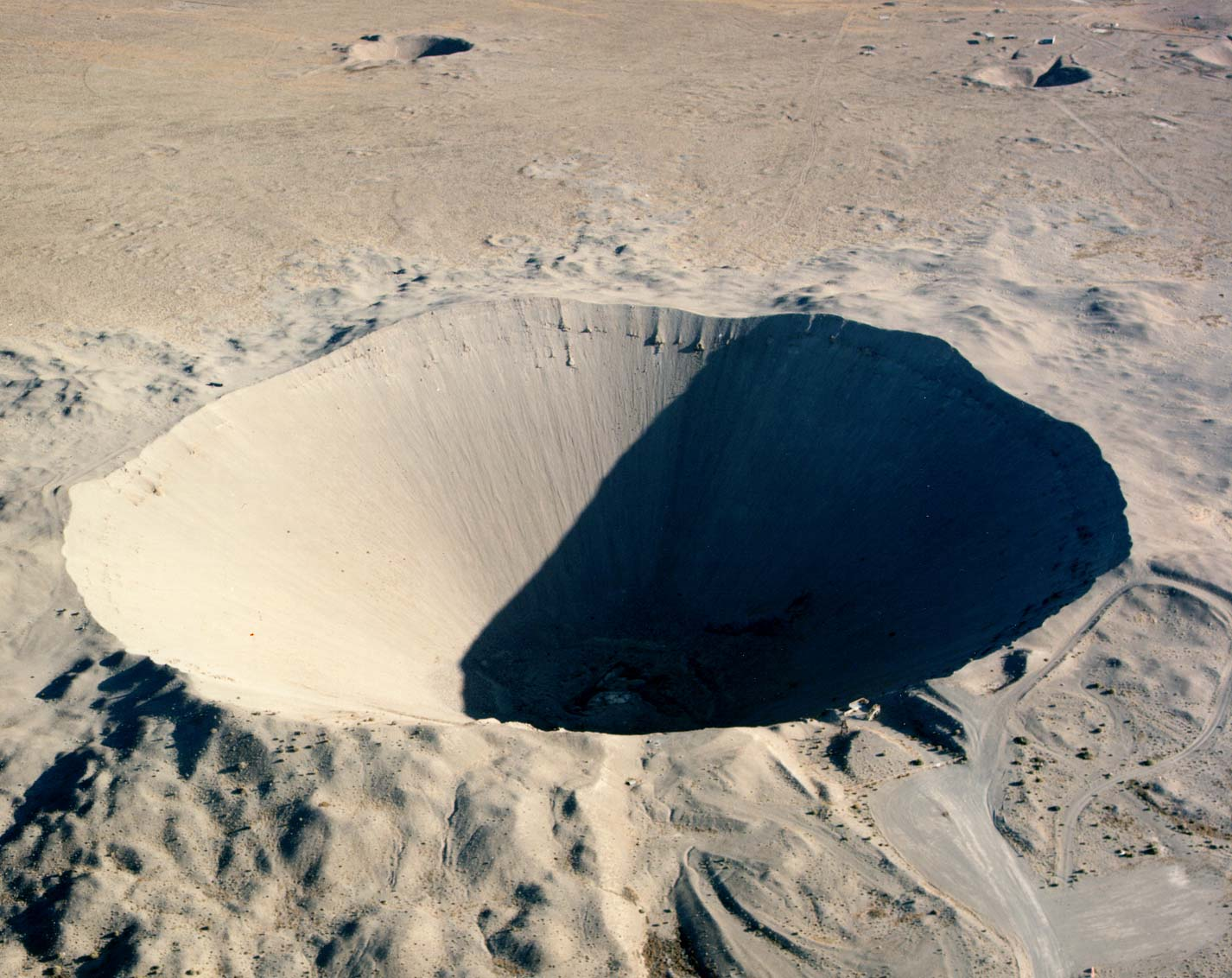
The 1962 Operation Plowshare "Sedan" plowshares shot displaced 12 million tons of earth and created a crater 320 feet (100 m) deep and 1,280 feet (390 m) wide

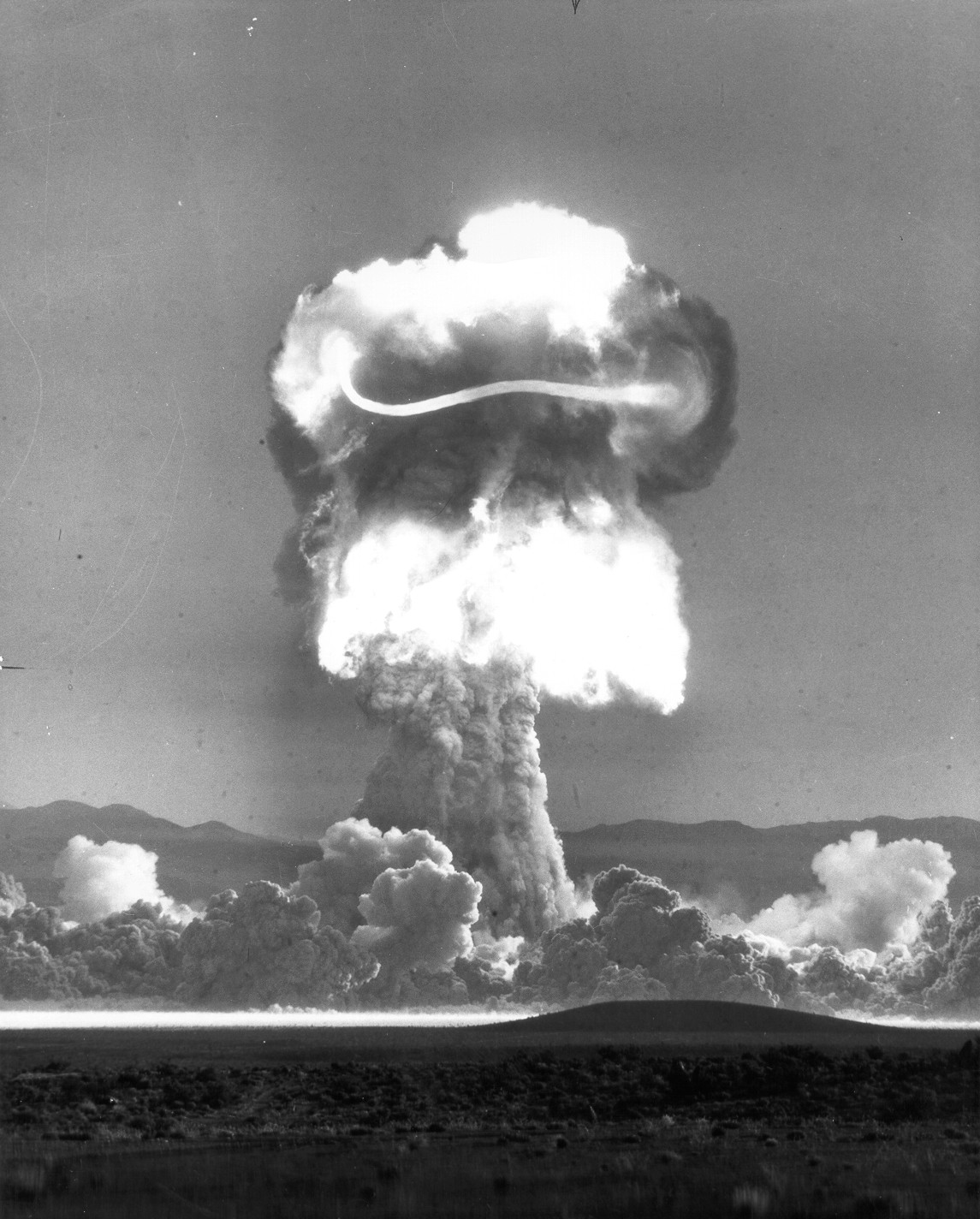
The 1957 Rainier Shot experiment in where a 1.7 kt underground nuclear test explosion

The proposal, for the use of nuclear weapons for oil and gas extraction, was first theorized, and devised by American geologist Manley L. Natland, at the Los Angeles-based Richfield Oil Company in 1956, originally under the name "Project Cauldron". Natland believed that an underground blast was the most efficient way to generate the heat needed to liquefy the viscous bitumen so that it could be pumped to the surface by conventional wells. The project was conceived of as part of Operation Plowshare, a United States project to harness the nuclear explosions for peaceful applications. Natland came up with the idea while he was working on location in the southern desert of Saudi Arabia and contemplated using the immense heat of a nuclear explosion while watching the sunset. Natland theorized drilling a deep borehole and detonating a nuclear weapon would result in an immense release of heat and energy would crush and melt surrounding rock, separate oil from sand and create an underground cavity where the oil would pool for conventional extraction. This method could be effective for the oil reserves of the McMurray Formation, which could not be viably exploited with the technology at the time as it was buried deep underground and highly viscous.

Natland was dispatched by Richfield to Alberta's Athabasca oil sands in 1957 to scout possibly drilling locations, which he found at the Pony Creek site, 8.7 km northwest from the nearest settlement of Chard. Pony Creek was chosen for six reasons: the absence of people and infrastructure, absence of developed oil fields which could be affected by the detonation, the Crown rights to the surface and mineral rights, significant estimated amount of oil to make the experiment viable, the depth of the oil sands deposit could contain the detonation, and the oil quality was high enough to be processed. Richfield entered into an exploration lease on Crown land in the area with Imperial Oil and City Service Athabasca Incorporated for 2 million acres of land and mineral rights.

Prospects for Natland's theory were boosted by two recent experiments, the Rainier Shot experiment in 1957 where a 1.7 kt underground nuclear test resulted in no fission products vented into the atmosphere, and the conventional explosion at Ripple Rock to remove an underwater mountain in April 1958. With the knowledge of the successful tests, Richfield executives met with United States Atomic Energy Commission chairman Willard Libby and members of the Lawrence Livermore National Laboratory including proponent of non-military use of nuclear weapons Edward Teller, on May 9, 1958, to discuss the oilsands proposal and begin the process of procuring a nuclear weapon. Richmond received support and interest from the meeting, as the American government saw the value of a new source of strategic oil reserves. However, some experts had doubts. In 1959, oil sands pioneer Robert Fitzsimmons of the International Bitumen Company wrote a letter to the Edmonton Journal, saying "While the writer does not know anything about nuclear energy and is therefore not qualified to make any definite statement as to it's [sic] results he does know something about the effect dry heat has on those sands and ventures a guess that if it does not turn the whole deposit into a burning inferno it is almost sure to fuse it into a solid mass of semi glass or coke."

In April 1959, the Federal Mines Department approved Project Oilsand. However, before the project could continue beyond preliminary steps, the Canadian government's stance on the use of nuclear devices changed. In April 1962, the Canadian Secretary of State for External Affairs, Howard Charles Green, said "Canada is opposed to nuclear tests, period". These 1962 changes in Canadian public opinion is regarded by historian Michael Payne to be due to the shift in public perception of nuclear explosives following the 1962 Cuban Missile Crisis, Project Oilsand was subsequently cancelled. Prime Minister John Diefenbaker told Parliament that the decision to detonate an atomic bomb on or under Canadian soil would be made by Canada, not the United States, and ordered Project Cauldron/Oilsand placed on permanent hold, citing the risk of upsetting the Soviet Union during nuclear disarmament negotiations being conducted in Geneva. The United States government continued with exploring the peaceful uses of nuclear detonations with Operation Plowshare, but was likewise eventually terminated in 1977.

Social scientist Benjamin Sovacool contends that the main problem was that the produced oil and gas was radioactive, which caused consumers to reject it. In contrast, oil and gas are sometimes considerably naturally radioactive to begin with and the industry is set up to deal with this, moreover in contrast to earlier stimulation efforts, contamination from many later tests was not a showstopping issue, it was primarily changing public opinion due to the societal fears caused by events such as the Cuban Missile Crisis, that resulted in protests, court cases and general hostility that ended the US exploration.

==== Reaction from Alberta ====
A month after the Richfield meeting with the AEC, Natland and Richfield executives travelled to Edmonton to meet Alberta's deputy minister of mines and minerals Hubert H. Somerville to discuss the proposal on June 5, 1958, Somerville was supportive of the idea. Somerville relayed the proposal to Premier Ernest Manning who was interested in exploring the concept. Following the meeting with deputy minister Somerville, Richfield executives met with federal regulators to discuss the proposal. This included staff of the Federal Mines Branch John Convey and Alexander Ignatieff; Donald Watson of Atomic Energy of Canada Limited; and Alexander Longair of the Defence Research Board, which was met with interest from the federal group.

An investigative committee was formed with the support of Alberta's Social Credit government. One of the committee's early recommendations was that, to minimize public fears, a "less effervescent name" should be used; Project Cauldron was subsequently renamed Project Oilsand.

In April 1959, the Federal Mines Department approved Project Oilsand; Pony Creek, Alberta (103 kilometres [64 miles] from Fort McMurray) was selected as a test site. Before the project could continue beyond these preliminary steps, however, the Canadian government's stance on the use of nuclear weapons shifted towards one of non-proliferation; out of concerns that it would increase the risk of Soviet espionage, Project Oilsand was put on hiatus. In April 1962, Canadian Secretary of State for External Affairs Howard Charles Green said "Canada is opposed to nuclear tests, period"; Project Oilsand was subsequently canceled.

== 1970s ==
In 1973 (OPEC) imposed an oil embargo in retaliation of the US supporting Israel during the Yom Kippur War causing the price of oil to spike. At the time of the oil embargo, 85% of Canada's oil came from Alberta. Pierre Trudeau responded to the embargo by imposing an oil export tax, forcing Alberta into giving a discounted price to the rest of the country at Alberta's expense. By 1975, the world price of oil had ballooned nearly 300%, to $12 a barrel, but central Canada was buying Alberta's oil for just $6.50 a barrel. Causing Premier Peter Lougheed to respond in a speech saying, "Why Alberta oil? Why not the lumber in British Columbia? Why not an export tax on the potash from Saskatchewan? On the nickel from Manitoba, on the pulp and paper and minerals from Ontario and Quebec? Why Alberta oil?... We intend to fight back, we have no other choice."

After Joe Clark's Progressive Conservatives won a minority government in 1979 defeating Pierre Trudeau's Liberal party Albertans were hopeful a change in federal energy policy would occur. These ideas were harnessed during Clark's unsuccessful 1980 election campaign. Clark, an Albertan, lost the election and resigned the leadership of the Progressive Conservative Party in 1983 after receiving only a 67% confidence vote at a party convention.

== Impact ==
Alberta's population in 1946 was 803,000, compared to neighbouring Saskatchewan's total of 833,000. At the 1951 census, Alberta's population had grown to 940,000 while Saskatchewan remained stagnant. The 1951 census also made note of the transformation the province was undergoing, as the urban population outnumbered the rural for the first time in the province's history. Alberta's population grew by another 400,000 throughout the 1950s.

The Government of Alberta attempted to manage growth and hoped to prevent the risk of so-called resource towns from turning into ghost towns once the oil boom passed them by, as had happened to turn-of-the-century coal mining towns across the province. The planned town of Devon, located west of Edmonton, was founded in 1949 by Imperial Oil with the assistance of the province to provide housing and services for workers of the Leduc-Woodbend oil field. Drayton Valley was the province's first model oil town as the government organized the rapid growth the hamlet of less than 100 people experienced beginning in 1954 following the discovery of the nearby Pembina oil field the year previous. Prior to the 1953 oil boom, the community of Drayton Valley was sparsely populated. With the main economic activities were farming and logging. Drayton Valley was incorporated as a village in 1956 and officially became a town in 1957. Similar communities followed, including Swan Hills, which incorporated as a town in 1967.

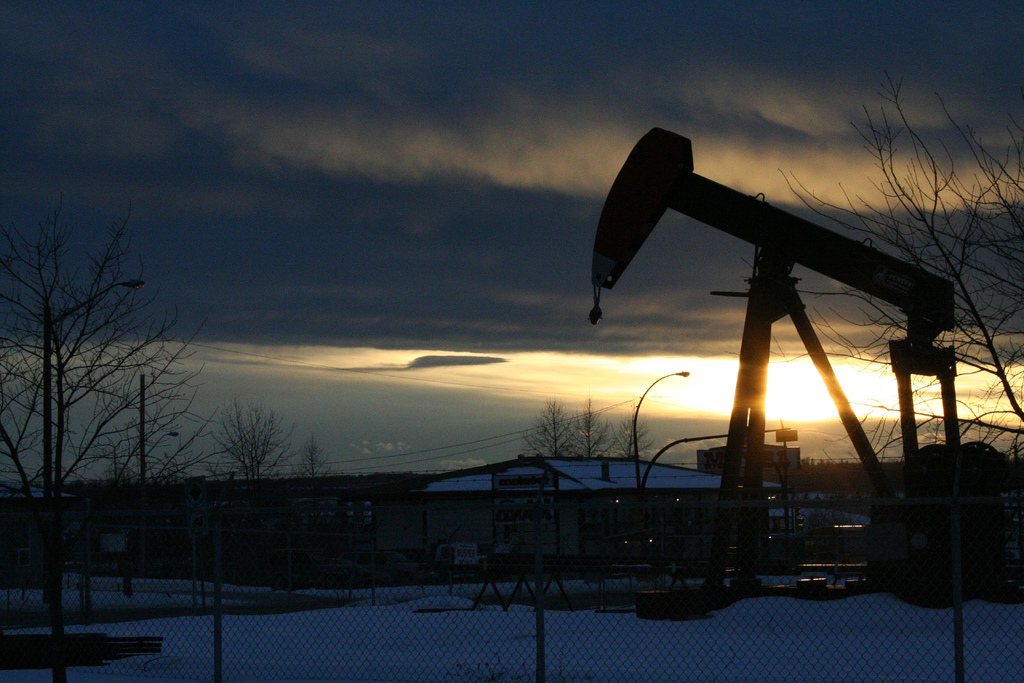
Drayton Valley is known for oil production

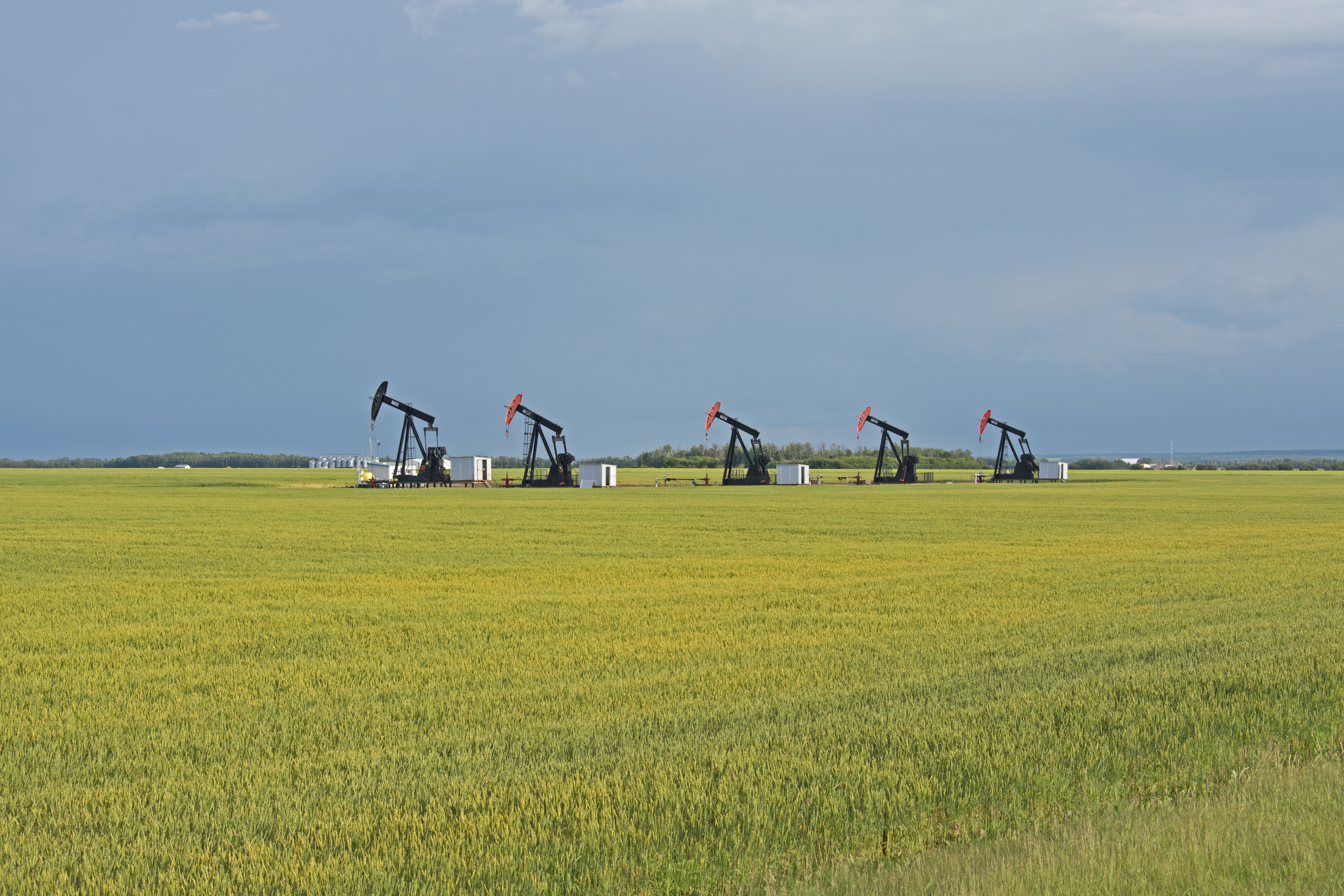
Oil pumps next to Falher, Alberta

| Year | Population | Five Year % change | Ten Year % change | Percentage of Canadian Pop. | Rank Among Provinces |
|---|---|---|---|---|---|
| 1901 | 73,022† | n/a | n/a | 1.4 | 9 |
| 1911 | 374,295 | n/a | 412.6 | 5.2 | 7 |
| 1921 | 588,454 | n/a | 57.2 | 6.7 | 5 |
| 1931 | 731,605 | n/a | 24.3 | 7.0 | 4 |
| 1941 | 796,169 | n/a | 8.8 | 6.9 | 5 |
| 1951 | 939,501 | n/a | 18.0 | 6.7 | 4 |
| 1956 | 1,123,116 | 19.5 | n/a | n/a | 4 |
| 1961 | 1,331,944 | 18.6 | 41.8 | 7.3 | 4 |
| 1969 | 1,463,203 | 9.9 | 30.3 | n/a | 4 |
| 1971 | 1,627,875 | 11.3 | 22.2 | 7.5 | 4 |
| 1976 | 1,838,035 | 12.9 | 25.6 | n/a | 4 |
| 1981 | 2,237,724 | 21.7 | 37.5 | 9.2 | 4 |
| 1986 | 2,365,830 | 5.7 | 28.7 | 9.3 | 4 |
| 1991 | 2,545,553 | 7.6 | 13.8 | 9.3 | 4 |
| 1996 | 2,696,826 | 5.9 | 14.0 | 9.3 | 4 |
| 2001 | 2,974,807 | 10.3 | 16.9 | 9.9 | 4 |
| 2006 | 3,290,350 | 10.6 | 22.0 | 10.4 | 4 |
| 2011 | 3,645,257 | 10.8 | 22.5 | 10.9 | 4 |
| 2016 | 4,067,175 | 11.6 | 22.4 | 11.6 | 4 |

† 1901 population for District of Alberta, part of the then-named North-West Territories.

== See also ==
- Alberta separatism
- Athabasca oil sands
- History of the petroleum industry in Canada
- Leduc No. 1
- Project Plowshare
- Western alienation
