= Stay Free Alberta =

Political advocacy group in Alberta, Canada

- Leader: Mitch Sylvestre
- Founder: Mitch Sylvestre
- Founded: December 11, 2025
- Ideology: Alberta separatism Western alienation
- Political position: Right-wing

Website
- stayfreealberta.com

Stay Free Alberta is an Albertan political advocacy group and non-party political movement that advocates for Alberta separatism. The organization became prominent in early 2026 after initiating an initiative petition under Alberta's "Citizen Initiative Act", collecting over 300,000 signatures calling for a provincial referendum on Alberta separating from Canada.

== History and background ==
Stay Free Alberta was established on December 11 2025., by activist Mitch Sylvestre who also serves as the chief executive officer of the Alberta Prosperity Project, another pro-independence group with links to Stay Free Alberta. The organization was formed with the aim of garnering enough signatures to force a referendum on Albertan separatism as outlined in the Citizen Initiative Act.

== 2026 Referendum petition ==
In early 2026, Stay Free Alberta initiated a petition drive. The group announced in May 2026 it had collected over 300,000 signatures, surpassing the statutory threshold of 10% by around 124,000 signatures.

On May 13 2026, Court of King's Bench Justice Shaina Leonard overturned Elections Alberta's approval of the petition following a legal challenge brought by several First nations, including the Athabasca Chipewyan First Nation, Kainai Nation, Piikani Nation, and Siksika Nation. Justice Leonard ruled that the Chief Electoral Officer erred in approving the petition without considering prior judicial precedent regarding Treaty rights, and determined that the provincial Crown had failed in its duty to consult Indigenous peoples.

As of July 24 2026, Elections Alberta completed the verification process and confirmed that the Stay Free Alberta petition met the signature threshold. However, after a court ruling quashed Elections Alberta's approval of the original independence petition, Premier Danielle Smith stepped in after calling the judge's ruling "anti-democratic" and announced the province will hold its own two step vote on October 19 asking Albertans whether the government should commence the legal process to hold a future binding referendum on separation.

== Ideology and platform ==
Stay Free Alberta advocates for full Alberta independence and the establishment of a sovereign state, framing its campaign around western alienation and opposition to the federal government in Ottawa. The organization operates as a grassroots, right-wing, movement.

The organization's support base consists largely of United Conservative Party voters, with leadership explicitly endorsing entryism by encouraging supporters to purchase party memberships to nominate pro-independence candidates.

== Reaction ==
=== Provincial government ===
Premier Danielle Smith expressed sympathy with the petition's signers, citing shared frustration with federal policies, but affirmed her personal stance in favor of Alberta remaining in Canada. Following the May 2026 court ruling that quashed the petition's approval, Smith criticized the decision as judicial overreach. To address the political debate while the petition remained stalled in appeal courts, Smith announced an October 2026 provincial ballot question asking whether Alberta should commence the legal framework for a future referendum. Jeffrey Rath, counsel for Stay Free Alberta, criticized Smith's secondary question as an unnecessary delay.

=== Indigenous Leadership ===
First nations leaders, including representatives from Treaty 6, Treaty 7, and Treaty 8, strongly opposed the movement and initiated the legal challenge that halted the petition. Indigenous leaders maintained that Alberta independence would violate constitutional treaty rights under Section 35 of the Constitution Act, 1982, and criticized both the petition organizers and the provincial government for failing to fulfill the Crown's duty to consult.

=== Opposition ===
Official Opposition Leader Naheed Nenshi of the Alberta New Democratic Party condemned the initiative and pledged to campaign against any separation proposals. At the federal level, Leader of the Official Opposition Pierre Poilievre stated that Conservatives would campaign for Canadian unity. A pro-unity counter-campaign, "Forever Canadian", mobilized against the petition, collecting over 450,000 signatures advocating to remain in Canada.

== See also ==
- 2026 Alberta independence referendum
- Alberta Sovereignty Act
- Maverick Party
- Politics of Alberta
- Quebec sovereignty movement
- Secessionist movements of Canada
- 1980 Quebec referendum
- 1995 Quebec referendum
