= Calgary Chamber of Commerce =

- Abbreviation: Calgary Chamber
- Predecessor: Calgary Board of Trade
- Formation: 1891
- Type: Non-profit business association
- Headquarters: Calgary, Alberta, Canada
- Region served: Calgary metropolitan area
- President and CEO: Deborah Yedlin
- Website: calgarychamber.com

The Calgary Chamber of Commerce is a non-profit, non-partisan business association based in Calgary, Alberta, Canada. The organization traces its roots to the Calgary Board of Trade and was formally established in 1891. It represents and advocates for local businesses through policy work, events, and ecosystem partnerships.

== History ==
Efforts to organize Calgary’s business community are documented from the late nineteenth century. The Calgary Board of Trade was established in the summer of 1885, with meetings recorded at the town hall in 1890 and 1891 following a petition for incorporation. A certificate of association was granted by the Dominion Government and officers were elected, including Alexander Lucas as president and P. J. Nolan as the first secretary.

The Board of Trade later adopted the name Calgary Chamber of Commerce. The University of Calgary library records note that the name change from Calgary Board of Trade occurred on 13 January 1950.

A centennial history, The First Hundred Years: The History of the Calgary Chamber of Commerce 1891-1991 by Jack Peach, provides an overview of the organization’s first century and is held in university collections.

== Facilities and locations ==
For much of the twentieth century, the Chamber occupied premises in Calgary’s downtown, most notably the former Odd Fellows Temple, a designated Edwardian Classical-style heritage building, listed on the Canadian Register of Historic Places. The Chamber purchased the building in 1979 and adapted it as its home.

In 2013, the Chamber departed that location and leased approximately 10,860 square ft on the sixth floor of the Burns Building, in line with a 10-year lease agreement initiated in March 2013.

In 2023–2024, the Chamber made a strategic move into The Ampersand, a net-zero, accessible office tower in downtown Calgary.

== Governance and leadership ==
The Chamber operates as an independent, member-supported association. Since July 2021, the president and CEO has been Deborah Yedlin, a business leader and former journalist. She took on the leadership role effective July 5, 2021.

== Activities ==
The Chamber convenes programs and events that connect businesses, policymakers, and community partners. Independent media coverage highlights a significant events calendar and member engagement across the city.

The Chamber is a member of the Canadian Global Cities Council, a national coalition of large city chambers that collaborates on federal policy and competitiveness issues.

During the COVID-19 pandemic, independent reporting noted that the Chamber’s advocacy during the pandemic centered on small business survival, access to federal and provincial relief programs, and long-term competitiveness in Calgary’s economy.

== Policy and advocacy ==
Independent reporting has summarized Chamber policy proposals on productivity, workforce, and competitiveness. In February 2025, local media described an 82-point platform developed through member surveys and roundtables, addressing competitiveness, trade, entrepreneurship, talent and labour, and community well-being.

Coverage in sector publications has also highlighted the Chamber’s calls for targeted skills and credential initiatives to address productivity challenges in Canada’s economy.

The Chamber regularly emphasizes the need to balance climate policy with economic competitiveness. In March 2024, it warned that the federal government’s proposed emissions cap on the oil and gas sector could undermine the valuation and sale of the Trans Mountain pipeline.

The Chamber has also supported Indigenous economic participation and reconciliation-related initiatives. For example, in May 2025 it invited Indigenous entrepreneurs to apply for free Chamber membership, removing cost-related barriers to access to its business networks.

== Awards and recognition ==
The Chamber’s post-flood business recovery work was recognized internationally. The International Chamber of Commerce World Chambers Federation credited the Calgary Chamber with the Best Unconventional Project at the 2015 World Chambers Competition in Torino, Italy, for initiatives that helped local firms return to operations after the 2013 floods.

== Notable early figures ==
- Alexander Lucas, founding president of the Calgary Board of Trade and later mayor of Calgary. Archival and local heritage sources document his role in early civic and commercial life.

== See also ==
- Chambers of commerce
