= Horst Schmid =

Canadian politician (1933–2026)

The Honourable Horst A. Schmid ECA

Member of the Legislative Assembly of Alberta
- In office August 30, 1971 – May 8, 1986
- Preceded by: New District
- Succeeded by: Marie Laing
- Constituency: Edmonton-Avonmore

Personal details
- Born: April 29, 1933 Munich, Bavaria, Germany
- Died: April 4, 2026 (aged 92)
- Party: Progressive Conservative
- Occupation: international trade businessman

Horst Adolph Louis Charles Schmid ECA (April 29, 1933 – April 4, 2026) was a German-Canadian politician and international trade businessman from the province of Alberta, Canada. He served as a member of the Legislative Assembly of Alberta, sitting with the governing Progressive Conservative party from 1971 to 1986. During his time in office, he served numerous ministerial portfolios in the Executive Council of Alberta.

== Early life ==
Horst A. Schmid was born in Munich, Germany, on April 29, 1933. He emigrated to Canada, moving up to Yellowknife, Northwest Territories to work as a miner in 1952. He moved to Edmonton, Alberta in 1956. After arriving from the North, Schmid took numerous courses from the University of Toronto in Business Administration, Business Finance, and Business Psychology.

In the late 1960s, Schmid ran a restaurant in Edmonton called the Hofbräuhaus, after the original in Munich. At that time, he also founded a Bavarian folk dance Schuhplattler group, the Bavarian Schuhplattlers of Edmonton, still active today. From 1956 to 1966, Schmid was the volunteer host of a weekly Sunday radio program on Radio CKUA Edmonton called "Music and News from the German-Speaking Countries of Europe" (Fraser, Alberta's Camelot, 2003, p. 64). This program also informed the listeners about their new home in Canada.

== Political career ==
=== Minister of Culture, Youth and Recreation 1971–1975 ===
Schmid ran for a seat in the Alberta Legislature for the first time in the 1971 Alberta general election. The contest in the new electoral district of Edmonton-Avonmore ended up being a close two-way race between Schmid and incumbent Social Credit MLA Gerrit Radstaak. Two other candidates rounded out the field. He won the hotly contested race in to pick up the seat for the Progressive Conservatives. His win helped that party form government after the election, one of only four times that power has shifted hands in Alberta's history.

He became the first Canadian post World War II immigrant elected to a legislature in Canada and to be appointed a Cabinet Minister in Canada.

Schmid was described by Dr. David S.R. Leighton, O.C., as "the dynamic German-born immigrant who became a hard-driving Minister of Culture, who had the job of implementing the government's arts strategy and did so with a vengeance" (Fraser, Alberta's Camelot, 2003, p. 7). As Minister, Schmid initiated and guided the development of countless programs in his portfolio. These included funding new cultural support programs, grants to support arts organizations, libraries and cultural heritage sites and groups across Alberta (Fraser, Alberta's Camelot, 2003, p. 70). The Cultural Development Branch generously supported visual arts, performing arts, film and literary arts. The Cultural Heritage Division of Schmid's department provided the guidelines for the support of heritage projects. In 1974, Schmid organized the Arts and You Festival, the first provincial Conference of the Arts in Red Deer attended by 1000 community members and artists.

=== Minister of Government Services and Minister of Culture 1975–1979 ===
Schmid would run for a second term in the 1975 Alberta general election. He and Raadstack would face each other for the second time. With incumbent ministerial advantage Schmid saw a significant gain in his popular vote while the opposition candidates collapsed. He was returned to his second term easily.

Premier Lougheed appointed Schmid as the Minister of Government Services and the Minister of Culture. During this appointment, Schmid initiated the following: Foundation for the Performing Arts, Cultural Heritage Foundation, Historical Resources Foundation, acquisition and development of the Ukrainian Cultural Heritage Village, First National Conference of Ministers Responsible for Culture and the First National conference of Ministers Responsible for Recreation. Schmid was part of the team that brought the 1978 Commonwealth Games to Edmonton. Schmid added the Commonwealth Games Arts Festival and Film Festival to the Commonwealth Games, still part of the Games to this day (Fraser, Alberta's Camelot, 2003, p 168).

The most important cultural assistance initiated at this time was the Alberta Matching Grants Program where private donations to arts organizations were matched by the provincial government up to twenty-five percent of their budget. This led to increased private sector donations in support of arts organizations (Fraser, Alberta's Camelot, 2003, p224).

=== Minister of State for Economic Development and International Trade 1979 - 1982 ===
His bid for a third term would see another significant popular vote increase. Schmid managed the second best popular vote of his career despite seeing some gains by the opposition candidates. He easily won his third term in office. After the election Lougheed appointed Schmid as Minister of State for Economic Development - International Trade. Schmid spearheaded the promotion of exporting manufactured goods and services to other countries through numerous trade missions. Schmid was also invited as guest speaker to many national and international conferences and meetings of the Oil and Gas Industry.

Schmid supported Mel Hurtig in his proposal to produce a Canadian Encyclopedia since 1975 which resulted in government funding of Mel Hurtig's The Canadian Encyclopedia as part of the celebration for Alberta's 75th Anniversary (Fraser, Alberta's Camelot, 2003, p. 117). Schmid was responsible for the return of a medicine bundle that had been housed in the Provincial Museum back to the Blood Reserve for use in their sacred Sun Dance ceremony.(Fraser, Alberta's Camelot, 2003, p76)

=== Minister of International Trade 1982–1985 ===
Schmid ran for his fourth term in office in the 1982 Alberta general election. He won the highest popular vote of his career. His margin of victory however was reduced as NDP candidate Kathy Wright heavily challenged Schmid to retain his seat. Lougheed appointed Schmid to be the Minister of International Trade. He served that portfolio until November 1985 when Don Getty who became the new premier that year appointed him Minister of Tourism. Schmid led very successful International Trade Missions as Minister of International Trade resulting in large signed contracts for Alberta companies.

=== Minister of Tourism 1985–1986 ===
As Minister, Schmid was responsible for promoting Alberta Tourism internationally, especially in Europe.

=== Commissioner General for Trade and Tourism 1986–1995 ===
In 1986, Schmid was appointed Commissioner General for Trade and Tourism for the Government of Alberta. He was responsible for the promotion of tourism to Alberta, especially from Europe. He again took numerous Alberta companies especially from the Oil and Gas Equipment and Services sector internationally, often to many as 40 countries in a year. These were highly successful trade missions. In cooperation with the airlines, international journalists were brought to Alberta to write about Alberta in their European publications. Schmid was able to convince travel companies especially to bring thousands of skiers to Alberta ski resorts. Schmid continued in this position for nine years.

After retiring from Public Office in 1995, Schmid returned to his international trade business as president and CEO of Flying Eagle Resources. He continued as chairman, CEO and/or Director of other Alberta companies.

In 1998, Schmid was appointed to the Patrons Council of the Heritage Community Foundation. In 2005, he was appointed one of the Centennial Ambassadors of the province of Alberta.

== Personal life and death ==
Schmid was married to Arleen, who predeceased him. He died on the evening of April 4, 2026, at the age of 92.
