= Edmonton-Avonmore =

Defunct provincial electoral district in Alberta, Canada

Alberta electoral district

Defunct provincial electoral district
- Legislature: Legislative Assembly of Alberta
- District created: 1971
- District abolished: 1997
- First contested: 1971
- Last contested: 1993

Edmonton-Avonmore was a provincial electoral district in Alberta, Canada, mandated to return a single member to the Legislative Assembly of Alberta using the first-past-the-post method of voting from 1971 to 1997.

== History ==
The Edmonton-Avonmore electoral district was created in the 1970 boundary redistribution from portions of Strathcona South.

The Edmonton-Avonmore electoral district was abolished in the 1996 boundary redistribution and was combined with a small portion of Edmonton-Gold Bar to form Edmonton-Mill Creek.

Edmonton-Avonmore 1970 boundaries
Bordering districts
North	East	West	South
Edmonton-Gold Bar, Edmonton-Strathcona	Edmonton-Ottewell	Wetaskiwin-Leduc	Edmonton-Parkallen, Edmonton-Whitemud
Legal description from The Legislative Assembly Act, S.A. 1970, c. 34
"—The boundary whereof is as follows: Commencing at the intersection of the centre line of 75th street with the centre line of 90th avenue; thence southerly along the centre line of 75th street to its intersection with the westerly production of the north boundary of section 11 in township 52, range 24, west of the 4th meridian; thence westerly along the said westerly production to the northeast corner of section 10 in said township; thence southerly along the east boundary of the north half of section 10 in said township to the north-east corner of the south-east quarter of said section; thence westerly along the north boundary of the said quarter section to the centre of section 10 in said township 52, range 24, west of the 4th meridian; thence southerly along the east boundary of the south-west quarter of said section to the north-east corner of the north-west quarter of section 3 in said township; thence westerly along the north boundary of the said quarter section to the north-east corner of section 4 in said township; thence southerly along the east boundary of section 4 in said township 52, range 24, west of the 4th meridian to the northerly limit of the registered R./W. plan 1225 K.S.; thence westerly along the said northerly limit to its intersection with the centre line of the Edmonton-Leduc Branch of the Canadian Pacific Railway; thence in a general northerly direction along the said centre line to its intersection with the centre line of Whyte Avenue; thence easterly along the said centre line to the centre line of 83 street; thence northerly and north-westerly along the said centre line to its intersection with the centre line of 90th avenue; thence easterly along the said centre line to the point of commencement. "

=== Members of the Legislative Assembly (MLAs) ===
Members of the Legislative Assembly for Edmonton-Avonmore
Assembly	Years	Member	Party
See Strathcona South electoral district from 1967-1971
17th	1971–1975	Horst Schmid	Progressive Conservative
18th	1975–1979	Horst Schmid	Progressive Conservative
19th	1979–1982	Horst Schmid	Progressive Conservative
20th	1982–1986	Horst Schmid	Progressive Conservative
21st	1986–1989	Marie Laing	New Democratic
22nd	1989–1993	Marie Laing	New Democratic
23rd	1993–1996	Gene Zwozdesky	Liberal
See Edmonton-Mill Creek electoral district from 1996-2019

== Election results ==
=== 1971 ===
1971 Alberta general election
Party	Candidate	Votes	%	±%
Progressive Conservative	Horst Schmid	3,913	42.75%	–
Social Credit	Gerrit Joseph Radstaak	3,681	40.21%	–
New Democratic	Bill McLean	1,303	14.23%	–
Liberal	John Kloster	257	2.81%	–
Total		9,154	–	–
Rejected, spoiled and declined		78	–	–
Eligible electors / turnout		13,490	68.44%	–
Progressive Conservative pickup new district.				
Source(s) Source: "Edmonton-Avonmore Official Results 1971 Alberta general election". Alberta Heritage Community Foundation.

=== 1975 ===
1975 Alberta general election
Party	Candidate	Votes	%	±%
Progressive Conservative	Horst Schmid	4,596	60.97%	18.22%
Social Credit	Gerrit Joseph Radstaak	1,341	17.79%	-22.42%
New Democratic	Neil Larsen	1,141	15.14%	0.90%
Liberal	Ann Mazur	413	5.48%	2.67%
Constitutional Socialist Party	Mike Uhryn	47	0.62%	–
Total		7,538	–	–
Rejected, spoiled and declined		13	–	–
Eligible electors / turnout		14,080	53.63%	–
Progressive Conservative hold		Swing		20.32%
Source(s) Source: "Edmonton-Avonmore Official Results 1975 Alberta general election". Alberta Heritage Community Foundation.

=== 1979 ===
1979 Alberta general election
Party	Candidate	Votes	%	±%
Progressive Conservative	Horst Schmid	5,382	54.11%	-6.86%
New Democratic	Olga Blondheim	2,363	23.76%	8.62%
Social Credit	Walter Zucht	1,691	17.00%	-0.79%
Liberal	Betty Ann Dumbeck	511	5.14%	-0.34%
Total		9,947	–	–
Rejected, spoiled and declined		N/A	–	–
Eligible electors / turnout		18,456	53.90%	–
Progressive Conservative hold		Swing		-6.42%
Source(s) Source: "Edmonton-Avonmore Official Results 1979 Alberta general election". Alberta Heritage Community Foundation.

=== 1982 ===
1982 Alberta general election
Party	Candidate	Votes	%	±%
Progressive Conservative	Horst Schmid	6,606	53.14%	-0.97%
New Democratic	Kathy Wright	4,045	32.54%	8.78%
Western Canada Concept	Jake Johnson	1,275	10.26%	–
Social Credit	Leif Oddson	466	3.75%	-13.25%
Communist	Rona Drennan	40	0.32%	–
Total		12,432	–	–
Rejected, spoiled and declined		52	–	–
Eligible electors / turnout		18,396	67.86%	–
Progressive Conservative hold		Swing		-4.88%
Source(s) Source: "Edmonton-Avonmore Official Results 1982 Alberta general election". Alberta Heritage Community Foundation.

=== 1986 ===
1986 Alberta general election
Party	Candidate	Votes	%	±%
New Democratic	Marie Laing	4,234	42.14%	9.60%
Progressive Conservative	Horst Schmid	4,141	41.21%	-11.92%
Liberal	Michael Brings	1,117	11.12%	–
Representative	Karl R. Badke	416	4.14%	–
Western Canada Concept	Mike Walker	140	1.39%	-8.86%
Total		10,048	–	–
Rejected, spoiled and declined		9	–	–
Eligible electors / turnout		24,172	41.61%	–
New Democratic gain from Progressive Conservative		Swing		-9.84%
Source(s) Source: "Edmonton-Avonmore Official Results 1986 Alberta general election". Alberta Heritage Community Foundation.

=== 1989 ===
1989 Alberta general election
Party	Candidate	Votes	%	±%
New Democratic	Marie Laing	5,290	41.71%	-0.43%
Progressive Conservative	James Albers	3,831	30.21%	-11.01%
Liberal	Don Massey	3,562	28.08%	16.97%
Total		12,683	–	–
Rejected, spoiled and declined		14	–	–
Eligible electors / turnout		24,345	52.15%	–
New Democratic hold		Swing		5.29%
Source(s) Source: "Edmonton-Avonmore Official Results 1989 Alberta general election". Alberta Heritage Community Foundation.

=== 1993 ===
1993 Alberta general election
Party	Candidate	Votes	%	±%
Liberal	Gene Zwozdesky	6,728	52.67%	24.59%
Progressive Conservative	Ken Alyluia	3,433	26.88%	-3.33%
New Democratic	Marie Laing	2,190	17.15%	-24.56%
Social Credit	Leslie M. Jackson	285	2.23%	–
Greens	Dennis Clark	97	0.76%	–
Natural Law	Lucia Hoff	40	0.31%	–
Total		12,773	–	–
Rejected, spoiled, and declined		28	–	–
Eligible electors / turnout		22,055	58.04%	–
Liberal gain from New Democratic		Swing		7.15%
Source(s) Source: "Edmonton-Avonmore Official Results 1993 Alberta general election". Alberta Heritage Community Foundation.

== See also ==
- List of Alberta provincial electoral districts
- Canadian provincial electoral districts
- Avonmore, a neighbourhood in south east Edmonton
