= Gerrit Radstaak =

Canadian politician (1914–1996)

Gerrit Joseph Radstaak

Member of the Legislative Assembly of Alberta
- In office May 23, 1967 – August 30, 1971
- Preceded by: New District
- Succeeded by: District Abolished
- Constituency: Strathcona South

Personal details
- Born: September 4, 1914 Winterswijk, the Netherlands
- Died: May 1, 1996 (aged 81)
- Party: Social Credit
- Occupation: politician

Gerrit Joseph Radstaak (September 4, 1914 – May 1, 1996) was a politician from Alberta, Canada. He served in the Legislative Assembly of Alberta from 1967 to 1971 as a member of the Social Credit Party.

== Political career ==
Radstaak first ran for a seat in the 1967 Alberta general election as the Social Credit candidate in the new electoral district of Strathcona South. He defeated Progressive Conservative candidate Oscar Kruger, a former player for the Edmonton Eskimos, and two other candidates with 40% of the popular vote.

Strathcona South was abolished in the 1971 boundary redistribution, and Radstaak ran for re-election in the new electoral district of Edmonton-Avonmore in the election held that year. He was defeated by Progressive Conservative candidate Horst Schmid.

Radstaak ran again in the 1975 general election and was again defeated by Schmid in a landslide.
