= Denise Woollard =

Canadian politician

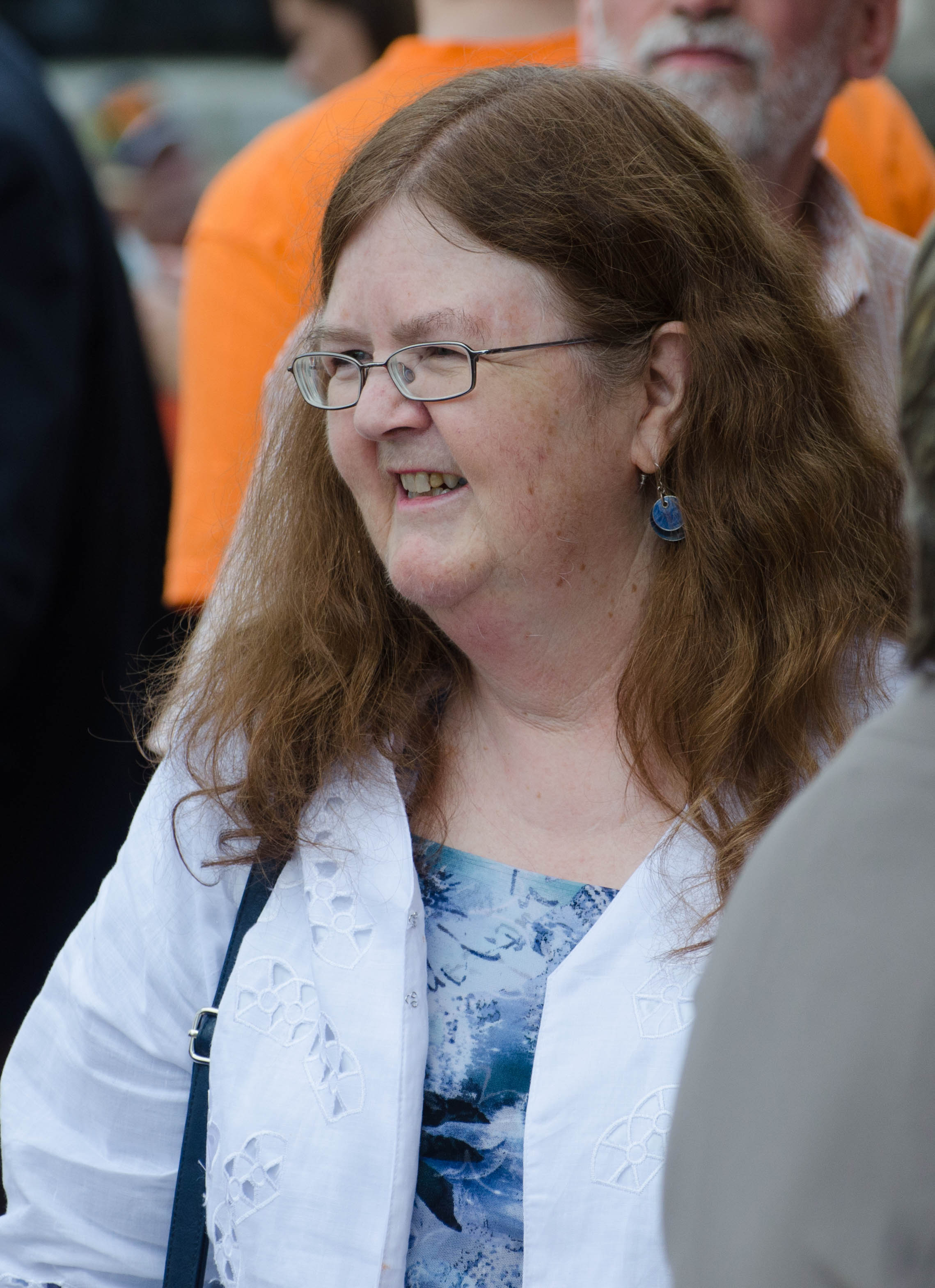
- Woollard in May 2015

Member of the Legislative Assembly of Alberta for Edmonton-Mill Creek
- In office May 5, 2015 – March 19, 2019
- Preceded by: Gene Zwozdesky
- Succeeded by: district abolished

Personal details
- Born: 1946 or 1947 (age 78–79)
- Party: Alberta New Democratic Party
- Occupation: university facilitator, teacher, school psychologist

Denise K. Woollard (born 1946) is a Canadian politician who was elected in the 2015 Alberta general election to the Legislative Assembly of Alberta representing the electoral district of Edmonton-Mill Creek. In the May 5, 2015 election, she defeated incumbent Progressive Conservative MLA and Speaker of the Legislative Assembly of Alberta, Gene Zwozdesky and other candidates to win the Edmonton Mill Creek seat.

She sought the NDP nomination in the redistributed riding of Edmonton-Meadows for the 2019 election, however she lost the nomination to Jasvir Deol and therefore did not run in the general election.

== Electoral history ==
=== 2012 general election ===
2012 Alberta general election: Fort McMurray-Wood Buffalo
Party	Candidate	Votes	%	±%
Progressive Conservative	Mike Allen	3,609	48.99%	–14.42%
Wildrose Alliance	Guy C. Boutilier	3,164	42.95%	–
New Democratic	Denise Woollard	372	5.05%	–2.67%
Liberal	Amy McBain	222	3.01%	–21.65%
Total		7,367	–	–
Rejected, spoiled and declined		55	32	0
Eligible electors / turnout		21,843	33.98%	+14.14%
Progressive Conservative hold		Swing		–16.35%
Source(s) Source: "59 - Fort McMurray-Wood Buffalo, 2012 Alberta general election". officialresults.elections.ab.ca. Elections Alberta. Chief Electoral Officer (2012). The Report of the Chief Electoral Officer on the 2011 Provincial Enumeration and Monday, April 23, 2012 Provincial General Election of the Twenty-eighth Legislative Assembly (PDF) (Report). Edmonton, Alta.: Elections Alberta. pp. 352–355. Archived (PDF) from the original on May 6, 2021.

=== 2015 general election ===
2015 Alberta general election: Edmonton-Mill Creek
Party	Candidate	Votes	%	±%
New Democratic	Denise Woollard	9,025	55.94%	44.83%
Progressive Conservative	Gene Zwozdesky	3,848	23.85%	-31.21%
Liberal	Harpreet Gill	1,896	11.75%	-1.88%
Wildrose	Saqib Raja	1,365	8.46%	-9.77%
Total		16,134	–	–
Rejected, spoiled and declined		59	–	–
Eligible electors / turnout		32,521	49.79%	1.69%
New Democratic gain from Progressive Conservative		Swing		-2.37%
Source(s) Source: "Elections Alberta 2015 General Election". Elections Alberta. "40 - Edmonton-Mill Creek". officialresults.elections.ab.ca. Elections Alberta.
