= Jackie Lovely =

Canadian politician

Jackie Lovely MLA

Member of the Legislative Assembly of Alberta for Camrose
- Incumbent
- Assumed office April 16, 2019
- Preceded by: Riding Established

Personal details
- Born: 1964 or 1965 (age 61–62)
- Party: United Conservative Party
- Other political affiliations: Wildrose (2012–17)

Jackie Lovely (born 1964/1965) is a Canadian politician who was elected in the 2019 Alberta general election to represent the electoral district of Camrose in the 30th Alberta Legislature. She is a member of the United Conservative Party.

== Earlier Life ==
Prior to serving in the Legislative Assembly, Jackie Lovely was employed with the Good Samaritan Society, a charitable organization which provides care services and programs to aging populations. Lovely also worked in property management, real estate company and project coordination. Additionally, Lovely has served as an English as a Second Language instructor as well as vice president for both the Camrose Chamber of Commerce and Leduc Chamber of Commerce. She is also a Rotarian.

Lovely holds an MBA from Cape Breton University, a Bachelor of Arts degree from the University of Saskatchewan, and a diploma in hotel and restaurant administration from Saskatchewan Polytechnic.

== Political career ==
Lovely started her political career as a candidate for the Wildrose Party, and ran unsuccessfully in 2012 and 2015 in the riding of Edmonton-Ellerslie. Following the amalgamation of the Wildrose and the Progressive Conservative parties, Lovely won her seat in the 2019 Alberta General Election, this time to represent Camrose as a Member of the Legislative Assembly of Alberta in the newly formed United Conservative Party (UCP) Government Caucus.

In April 2021, she proposed Bill 216, the Fire Prevention and Fire Services Recognition Act, aimed at creating a Fire Services Recognition Day within Fire Prevention Week.

On November 23, 2021, Lovely was appointed the Parliamentary Secretary for Status of Women, a position which she held until October 23, 2022.

Lovely tabled Bill 205, The Official Sport of Alberta Act following its introduction to the legislature in December, 2022. Calgary-North MLA Muhammad Yaseen introduced a similar Private Member's Bill in December, 2020.

=== Essay contest controversy ===
The Her Vision Inspires essay contest was announced in February 2022 and was a partnership between the Legislative Assembly of Alberta and the Commonwealth Women Parliamentarians Canadian Region. Young women between the ages of 17 and 25 were asked to describe their "unique vision for Alberta," and what they would do if elected to be an MLA.

Lovely and Fort Saskatchewan-Vegreville MLA Jackie Armstrong-Homeniuk were counted among the judges for the contest. On August 8, 2022, NDP MLA Janis Irwin brought attention to an essay awarded third place in the contest due to its controversial subject matter. Lovely apologized for her part in judging the essay in the contest.

=== 2023 General Election ===
Jackie Lovely was re-elected in the 2023 Alberta general election.

=== Recall Petition ===
A recall petition against Lovely was approved by Elections Alberta on November 14, 2025. Signature collection runs from November 26, 2025 to February 23, 2026, requiring 12,391 signatures.

== Electoral history ==
=== 2012 general election ===
2012 Alberta general election: Edmonton-Ellerslie
Party	Candidate	Votes	%	±%
Progressive Conservative	Naresh Bhardwaj	5,677	42.97	+1.06
Wildrose Alliance	Jackie Lovely	3,258	24.66	+20.35
New Democratic	Rod Loyola	2,114	16.00	-1.30
Liberal	Jennifer Ketsa	1,504	11.38	-21.47
Alberta Party	Chinwe Okelu	523	3.96	–
Independent	Athena Bernal-Born	137	1.04	–
Total		13,213	98.83	–
Rejected, spoiled and declined		157	1.17	+0.44
Turnout		13,370	50.04	+14.87
Eligible voters		26,721		
Progressive Conservative hold		Swing		-9.64
Source(s) Source: "33 - Edmonton-Ellerslie, 2012 Alberta general election". officialresults.elections.ab.ca. Elections Alberta. Chief Electoral Officer (2012). The Report of the Chief Electoral Officer on the 2011 Provincial Enumeration and Monday, April 23, 2012 Provincial General Election of the Twenty-eighth Legislative Assembly (PDF) (Report). Edmonton, Alta.: Elections Alberta. Archived (PDF) from the original on May 6, 2021.

=== 2015 general election ===
2015 Alberta general election: Edmonton-Ellerslie
Party	Candidate	Votes	%	±%
New Democratic	Rod Loyola	11,034	61.57	+45.57
Progressive Conservative	Harman Kandola	3,549	19.80	-23.16
Wildrose	Jackie Lovely	2,499	13.94	-10.71
Liberal	Mike McGowan	839	4.68	-6.70
Total		17,921	99.30	–
Rejected, spoiled and declined		127	0.70	-0.47
Turnout		18,048	52.67	+2.63
Eligible voters		34,266		
New Democratic gain from Progressive Conservative		Swing		+34.37
Source(s) Source: "33 - Edmonton-Ellerslie, 2015 Alberta general election". officialresults.elections.ab.ca. Elections Alberta. Chief Electoral Officer (2016). 2015 General Election. A Report of the Chief Electoral Officer (PDF) (Report). Edmonton, Alta.: Elections Alberta.

=== 2019 general election ===
2019 Alberta general election: Camrose
Party	Candidate	Votes	%	±%
United Conservative	Jackie Lovely	15,587	65.28%	–
New Democratic	Morgan Bamford	4,387	18.37%	–
Alberta Party	Kevin Smook	3,059	12.81%	–
Freedom Conservative	Wes Caldwell	387	1.62%	–
Alberta Advantage	Sandra Kim	173	0.72%	–
Alberta Independence	Don Dubitz	158	0.66%	–
Independent	Bonnie Tanton	126	0.53%	–
Total		23,877	–	–
Rejected, spoiled and declined		122	73	11
Eligible electors / turnout		32,195	74.58%	–
United Conservative pickup new district.				
Source(s) Source: "53 - Camrose, 2019 Alberta general election". officialresults.elections.ab.ca. Elections Alberta.

=== 2023 general election ===
2023 Alberta general election: Camrose
Party	Candidate	Votes	%	±%
United Conservative	Jackie Lovely	13,032	63.40	-1.88
New Democratic	Richard Bruneau	5,579	27.14	+8.77
Independent	Bob Blayone	1,740	8.46	–
Wildrose Loyalty Coalition	Pamela Henson	205	1.00	–
Total		20,556	99.54	–
Rejected and declined		96	0.46	
Turnout		20,652	61.58	
Eligible voters		33,537		
United Conservative hold		Swing		-5.33
Source(s) Source: Elections Alberta
