= Strathcona South =

Defunct provincial electoral district in Alberta, Canada

Alberta electoral district

Defunct provincial electoral district
- Legislature: Legislative Assembly of Alberta
- District created: 1967
- District abolished: 1971
- First contested: 1967
- Last contested: 1967

Strathcona South was a provincial electoral district in Alberta, Canada, mandated to return a single member to the Legislative Assembly of Alberta using the first past the post method of voting from 1967 to 1971.

== History ==
The district was created in 1967 out of the southern part of Strathcona East. In 1971, the district was split between Edmonton-Avonmore and Edmonton-Ottewell.

== Election results ==
=== 1967 ===
1967 Alberta general election
Party	Candidate	Votes	%	±%
Social Credit	Gerrit Radstaak	3,934	40.90%	–
Progressive Conservative	Oscar Kruger	2,594	26.97%	–
New Democratic	Bill McLean	2,123	22.07%	–
Liberal	John Kloster	968	10.06%	–
Total		9,619	–	–
Rejected, spoiled and declined		40	–	–
Eligible electors / turnout		15,241	63.38%	–
Social Credit pickup new district.				
Source(s) Source: "Strathcona-South Official Results 1967 Alberta general election". Alberta Heritage Community Foundation.

== See also ==
- List of Alberta provincial electoral districts
- Canadian provincial electoral districts
