= Oscar Kruger =

Canadian football player (1932–2010)

No. 14, 22, 94, 96
- Position: Defensive back

Personal information
- Born: December 24, 1932; Edmonton, Alberta, Canada
- Died: July 4, 2010 (aged 77); Edmonton, Alberta, Canada
- Listed height: 5 ft 9 in (1.75 m)
- Listed weight: 170 lb (77 kg)

Career information
- CJFL: Edmonton Wildcats

Career history
- 1954–1965: Edmonton Eskimos

Awards and highlights
- 3× Grey Cup champion (1954, 1955, 1956); 4× CFL West All-Star (1957, 1958, 1961, 1962); Edmonton Eskimos Wall of Honour (1992)

Oskar Kruger (December 24, 1932 – July 4, 2010) was a Canadian professional football defensive back for the Edmonton Eskimos from 1954 to 1965 of the Canadian Football League.

Brought up in Edmonton, Kruger played for the Edmonton Wildcats in 1953 and then in 1954 for the Edmonton Eskimos. He played 12 seasons at safety and ended his career with 46 interceptions and 14 fumble recoveries. Kruger was also a boxing champion for Alberta. While playing football, he attended the University of Alberta from which he graduated with a law degree. He was a Western Conference All-Star in 1957, 1958, 1961, and 1962 and also led the league in interceptions 3 times. In particular, he intercepted 7 balls each year from 1956 to 1958 and 6 balls in 1961 and 1963. He was also a punt returner, especially at the start of his career.

In 1963, Kruger was named the Eskimos’ Top Canadian before retiring in 1965. His name is honoured on the Edmonton Eskimos Wall of Honour on the Commonwealth Stadium.

After his football career, Kruger practiced law in Edmonton after obtaining his degree from the University of Alberta.

Kruger contested the 1967 Alberta general election in the Strathcona South constituency as a member of the Progressive Conservative Association of Alberta. Kruger was defeated by Social Credit candidate Gerrit Radstaak.
