= Debby Carlson =

Canadian politician

Member of the Legislative Assembly of Alberta
- In office 1993–2004
- Succeeded by: Bharat Agnihotri
- Constituency: Edmonton Ellerslie

Personal details
- Born: April 5, 1957 (age 69) Cereal, Alberta, Canada
- Party: Alberta Liberal Party
- Spouse: Mike Percy
- Education: Athabasca University
- Occupation: Businesswoman

Debby Carlson (born April 5, 1957) is a former Liberal MLA in Alberta, who represented the electoral district of Edmonton Ellerslie from 1993 to 2004.

Carlson won her seat in southeast Edmonton's Ellerslie area, and held it in the 1993, 1997, and 2001 elections until 2004 when she won a highly contested federal Liberal Party nomination in the Edmonton Strathcona riding. In 2004, Carlson was unsuccessful in her campaign against Conservative incumbent Rahim Jaffer, where she placed second. She was Deputy Leader of the Opposition and was once a star player in the Alberta Liberal Party, but then took a position as environmental critic.

She is married to Mike Percy, the former Liberal MLA for Edmonton-Whitemud (1993–1997), and Dean of the Alberta School of Business at the University of Alberta.
