= Edmonton-Ellerslie =

Provincial electoral district in Alberta, Canada

Coordinates: 53.43°N 113.42°W

Alberta electoral district
- Edmonton-Ellerslie within the City of Edmonton, 2017 boundaries

Provincial electoral district
- Legislature: Legislative Assembly of Alberta
MLA
Gurtej Singh Brar
New Democratic
- District created: 1993
- First contested: 1993
- Last contested: 2023

Edmonton-Ellerslie is a provincial electoral district in Alberta, Canada. It is mandated to return a single member to the Legislative Assembly.

== History ==
The 2010 boundary redistribution saw the riding shrink on its north boundary to Anthony Henday Drive from roughly 34 Avenue, losing some land to Edmonton-Mill Woods and Edmonton-Mill Creek.

=== Boundary history ===
33 Edmonton-Ellerslie 2003 boundaries
Bordering districts
North	East	West	South
Edmonton-Mill Creek and Edmonton-Mill Woods	Strathcona	Edmonton-Rutherford and Edmonton-Whitemud	Leduc-Beaumont-Devon
riding map goes here			
Legal description from the Statutes of Alberta 2003, Electoral Divisions Act
Starting at the intersection of Gateway Boulevard with 34 Avenue; then 1. east along 34 Avenue to 91 Street; 2. south along 91 Street to 28 Avenue; 3. east along 28 Avenue to 50 Street; 4. south along 50 Street to 23 Avenue; 5. east along 23 Avenue to the east Edmonton city boundary; 6. south and west along the east city boundary to Gateway Boulevard; 7. northeast along Gateway Boulevard to the starting point.

33 Edmonton-Ellerslie 2010 boundaries
Bordering districts
North	East	West	South
Edmonton-Mill Creek and Edmonton-Mill Woods	Strathcona-Sherwood Park	Edmonton-Rutherford and Edmonton-South West	Leduc-Beaumont
Legal description from the Statutes of Alberta 2010, Electoral Divisions Act

=== Electoral history ===
Members of the Legislative Assembly for Edmonton-Ellerslie
Assembly	Years	Member	Party
See Edmonton-Mill Woods 1979-1993
23rd	1993–1997	Debby Carlson	Liberal
24th	1997–2001	Debby Carlson	Liberal
25th	2001–2004	Debby Carlson	Liberal
25th	2004	Vacant	
26th	2004–2008	Bharat Agnihotri	Liberal
27th	2008–2012	Naresh Bhardwaj	Progressive; Conservative
28th	2012–2015	Naresh Bhardwaj	Progressive; Conservative
29th	2015–2019	Rod Loyola	New Democratic
30th	2019–2023	Rod Loyola	New Democratic
31st	2023–2025	Rod Loyola	New Democratic
31st	2025	Vacant	
31st	2025–Present	Gurtej Singh Brar	New Democratic

The electoral district was created in 1993 from Edmonton-Mill Woods. The first election held that year saw incumbent NDP MLA Gerry Gibeault switch from that district to run in Ellerslie. A wave of support for the Alberta Liberals rolled across Edmonton causing Liberal candidate Debby Carlson to win the riding with over half the popular vote. Gibeault was defeated, finishing a distant second place.

Carlson ran for a second term in 1997. She increased her popular support to take the district easily with almost 57% of the popular vote. The 2001 election was a very tight race. Carlson barely hung on to win her third term in office. She defeated Progressive Conservative candidate Sukhi Randhawa by less than 300 votes and won the seat with 45 percent of the vote.

On May 28, 2004, Carlson vacated her seat to run in the 2004 federal election in the Edmonton—Strathcona district. Her replacement elected in the provincial election that year was Liberal candidate Bharat Agnihotri. He took just under 34% of the popular vote and won by a razor thin plurality of 200 votes over his Progressive Conservative opponent, and just 1200 votesl over his NDP opponent.

The Progressive Conservatives won the riding in the 2008 election when its candidate Naresh Bhardwaj defeated the incumbent MLA trying for re-election and won the set with 42% of the popular vote. The 2012 result was about the same with the P-C candidate winning with a minority of the vote.

NDP candidate Rod Loyola won the seat three consecutive times — 2015, 2019, and 2023.

== Legislative election results ==
=== 2025 ===
Alberta provincial by-election, June 23, 2025 Resignation of Rod Loyola
** Preliminary results — Not yet official **
Party	Candidate	Votes	%	±%
New Democratic	Gurtej Singh Brar	4,327	50.84	-10.90
United Conservative	Naresh Bhardwaj	3,239	38.06	+1.23
Liberal	Manpreet Tiwana	410	4.82	–
Republican	Fred Munn	291	3.42	–
Alberta Party	Caroline Currie	203	2.39	–
Wildrose Loyalty Coalition	Pamela Henson	41	0.48	-0.94
Total valid votes		8,511		
Total rejected ballots				
Turnout				
Eligible voters				
New Democratic hold		Swing		-6.07
Source(s) Source: Elections Alberta

=== 2023 ===
2023 Alberta general election
Party	Candidate	Votes	%	±%
New Democratic	Rod Loyola	11,429	61.75	+10.80
United Conservative	Ranjit Bath	6,817	36.83	-1.08
Wildrose Loyalty Coalition	Angela Stretch	264	1.43	–
Total		18,510	99.42	–
Rejected and declined		206	1.10	+0.25
Turnout		18,716	56.24	-9.41
Eligible voters		33,278		
New Democratic hold		Swing		+5.94
Source(s) Source: Elections Alberta

=== 2019 ===
2019 Alberta general election
Party	Candidate	Votes	%	±%
New Democratic	Rod Loyola	9,717	50.95	-10.68
United Conservative	Sanjay Patel	7,230	37.91	+5.50
Alberta Party	Hazelyn Williams	1,273	6.67	+6.66
Liberal	Mike McGowan	390	2.04	-3.89
Alberta Advantage	Yash Sharma	263	1.38	–
Alberta Independence	Brian S. Lockyer	199	1.04	–
Total		19,072	98.93	–
Rejected, spoiled and declined		163	0.85	
Turnout		19,235	65.66	
Eligible voters		29,297		
New Democratic hold		Swing		-8.09
Source(s) Source: "31 - Edmonton-Ellerslie, 2019 Alberta general election". officialresults.elections.ab.ca. Elections Alberta. Alberta. Chief Electoral Officer (2019). 2019 General Election. A Report of the Chief Electoral Officer. Volume II (PDF) (Report). Vol. 2. Edmonton, Alta.: Elections Alberta. pp. 120–123. ISBN 978-1-988620-12-1.

=== 2015 ===
Redistributed results, 2015 Alberta election
Party	Votes	%
New Democratic	7,021	61.63
Progressive Conservative	2,314	20.31
Wildrose	1,378	12.10
Liberal	676	5.93
Alberta Party	2	0.02
Green	1	0.01

2015 Alberta general election
Party	Candidate	Votes	%	±%
New Democratic	Rod Loyola	11,034	61.57	+45.57
Progressive Conservative	Harman Kandola	3,549	19.80	-23.16
Wildrose	Jackie Lovely	2,499	13.94	-10.71
Liberal	Mike McGowan	839	4.68	-6.70
Total		17,921	99.30	–
Rejected, spoiled and declined		127	0.70	-0.47
Turnout		18,048	52.67	+2.63
Eligible voters		34,266		
New Democratic gain from Progressive Conservative		Swing		+34.37
Source(s) Source: "33 - Edmonton-Ellerslie, 2015 Alberta general election". officialresults.elections.ab.ca. Elections Alberta. Chief Electoral Officer (2016). 2015 General Election. A Report of the Chief Electoral Officer (PDF) (Report). Edmonton, Alta.: Elections Alberta.

=== 2012 ===
2012 Alberta general election
Party	Candidate	Votes	%	±%
Progressive Conservative	Naresh Bhardwaj	5,677	42.97	+1.06
Wildrose Alliance	Jackie Lovely	3,258	24.66	+20.35
New Democratic	Rod Loyola	2,114	16.00	-1.30
Liberal	Jennifer Ketsa	1,504	11.38	-21.47
Alberta Party	Chinwe Okelu	523	3.96	–
Independent	Athena Bernal-Born	137	1.04	–
Total		13,213	98.83	–
Rejected, spoiled and declined		157	1.17	+0.44
Turnout		13,370	50.04	+14.87
Eligible voters		26,721		
Progressive Conservative hold		Swing		-9.64
Source(s) Source: "33 - Edmonton-Ellerslie, 2012 Alberta general election". officialresults.elections.ab.ca. Elections Alberta. Chief Electoral Officer (2012). The Report of the Chief Electoral Officer on the 2011 Provincial Enumeration and Monday, April 23, 2012 Provincial General Election of the Twenty-eighth Legislative Assembly (PDF) (Report). Edmonton, Alta.: Elections Alberta. Archived (PDF) from the original on May 6, 2021.

=== 2008 ===
2008 Alberta general election
Party	Candidate	Votes	%	±%
Progressive Conservative	Naresh Bhardwaj	4,581	41.90	+10.08
Liberal	Bharat Agnihotri	3,592	32.86	-0.94
New Democratic	Marilyn Assheton-Smith	1,891	17.30	-4.85
Wildrose Alliance	Krista Leddy	471	4.31	-5.59
Green	Paul J. Boos	335	3.06	–
Social Credit	Cheryl Ullah	62	0.57	-1.77
Total		10,932	99.26	–
Rejected, spoiled and declined		81	0.74	+0.13
Turnout		11,013	35.17	-8.37
Eligible voters		31,317		
Progressive Conservative gain from Liberal		Swing		+5.51
Source(s) Source: "30 - Edmonton-Ellerslie, 2008 Alberta general election". officialresults.elections.ab.ca. Elections Alberta. Chief Electoral Officer (2008). The Report on the March 3, 2008 Provincial General Election of the Twenty-Seventh Legislative Assembly (Report). Edmonton, Alta.: Elections Alberta. pp. 290–293.

=== 2004 ===
2004 Alberta general election
Party	Candidate	Votes	%	±%
Liberal	Bharat Agnihotri	3,446	33.80	-11.06
Progressive Conservative	Gurnam Dodd	3,245	31.83	-10.31
New Democratic	Marilyn Assheton-Smith	2,258	22.15	+9.14
Alberta Alliance	Eleanor Maroes	1,009	9.90	–
Social Credit	Amelia Maciejewski	238	2.33	–
Total		10,196	99.40	–
Rejected, spoiled and declined		62	0.60	-0.00
Turnout		10,258	43.53	-8.78
Eligible voters		23,563		
Liberal hold		Swing		-0.38
Source(s) Source: Alberta. Chief Electoral Officer (2005). Report of the Chief Electoral Officer on the General Enumeration and General Election of the Twenty-sixth Legislative Assembly (PDF) (Report). Edmonton: Alberta Legislative Assembly, Office of the Chief Electoral Officer.

=== 2001 ===
2001 Alberta general election
Party	Candidate	Votes	%	±%
Liberal	Debby Carlson	4,481	44.86	-11.83
Progressive Conservative	Sukhi Randhawa	4,209	42.14	+16.11
New Democratic	Deborah Morrison	1,299	13.00	+4.01
Total		9,989	99.39	–
Rejected, spoiled and declined		61	0.61	+0.10
Turnout		10,050	52.32	-3.44
Eligible voters		19,210		
Liberal hold		Swing		-13.97
Source(s) Source: "Edmonton-Ellerslie Official Results 2001 Alberta general election". Alberta Heritage Community Foundation. Alberta. Chief Electoral Officer (2001). The report of the Chief Electoral Officer on the 2000 provincial confirmation process and Monday, March 12, 2001, Provincial General Election of the twenty-fifth Legislative Assembly. Edmonton: Alberta Legislative Assembly, Office of the Chief Electoral Officer.

=== 1997 ===
1997 Alberta general election
Party	Candidate	Votes	%	±%
Liberal	Debby Carlson	5,752	56.69%	3.12%
Progressive Conservative	Jasbeer Singh	2,641	26.03%	5.29%
New Democratic	Henry Johns	913	9.00%	-12.01%
Social Credit	Ken Way	840	8.28%	4.38%
Total		10,146	–	–
Rejected, spoiled and declined		28	24	0
Eligible electors / turnout		18,290	55.63%	-3.37%
Liberal hold		Swing		-0.95%
Source(s) Source: "Edmonton-Ellerslie Official Results 1997 Alberta general election". Alberta Heritage Community Foundation. Alberta. Chief Electoral Officer (1997). Report of the Chief Electoral Officer, November, 1996 general enumeration and Tuesday, March 11, 1997 general election Twenty-fourth Legislative Assembly. Edmonton: Alberta Legislative Assembly, Office of the Chief Electoral Officer.

=== 1993 ===
1993 Alberta general election
Party	Candidate	Votes	%	±%
Liberal	Debby Carlson	5,466	53.57%	–
New Democratic	Gerry Gibeault	2,144	21.01%	–
Progressive Conservative	Bas Roopnarine	2,116	20.74%	–
Social Credit	Ken Way	398	3.90%	–
Natural Law	Rhonda Day	79	0.77%	–
Total		10,203	–	–
Rejected, spoiled and declined		15	–	–
Eligible electors / turnout		17,320	59.00%	–
Liberal pickup new district.				
Source(s) Source: "Edmonton-Ellerslie Official Results 1993 Alberta general election". Alberta Heritage Community Foundation.

== Senate nominee election results ==
=== 2004 ===
2004 Senate nominee election results: Edmonton-Ellerslie				Turnout 43.51%	
Affiliation	Candidate	Votes	% votes	% ballots	Rank
Progressive Conservative	Betty Unger	3,949	14.08%	45.67%	2
Independent	Link Byfield	3,314	11.82%	38.33%	4
Progressive Conservative	Bert Brown	3,122	11.13%	36.11%	1
Alberta Alliance	Michael Roth	2,901	10.35%	33.55%	7
Progressive Conservative	Cliff Breitkreuz	2,899	10.34%	33.53%	3
Alberta Alliance	Vance Gough	2,574	9.18%	29.77%	8
Independent	Tom Sindlinger	2,531	9.03%	29.27%	9
Alberta Alliance	Gary Horan	2,524	9.00%	29.19%	10
Progressive Conservative	David Usherwood	2,356	8.40%	27.25%	6
Progressive Conservative	Jim Silye	1,874	6.67%	21.67%	5
Total votes		28,044	100%		
Total ballots		8,647	3.24 votes per ballot		
Rejected, spoiled and declined		1,688			

Voters had the option of selecting four candidates on the ballot.

== Student vote results ==
=== 2004 ===
Participating schools
Holy Trinity Catholic High School
J. Percy Page High School

On November 19, 2004, a student vote was conducted at participating Alberta schools to parallel the 2004 Alberta general election results. The vote was designed to educate students and simulate the electoral process for persons who had not yet reached the legal majority. The vote was conducted in 80 of the 83 provincial electoral districts with students voting for actual election candidates. Schools with a large student body who reside in another electoral district had the option to vote for candidates outside of the electoral district than where they were physically located.

2004 Alberta student vote results
Affiliation	Candidate	Votes	%
Liberal	Bharat Agnihotri	321	35.99%
Progressive Conservative	Gurnam Dodd	309	34.64%
NDP	Marilyn Assheton-Smith	142	15.92%
Alberta Alliance	Eleanor Maroes	67	7.51%
Social Credit	Amelia Maciejewski	53	5.94%
Total		892	100%
Rejected, spoiled and declined		24	

=== 2012 ===
2012 Alberta student vote results
Affiliation	Candidate	Votes	%
Progressive Conservative	Naresh Bhardwaj		
Wildrose	Jackie Lovely		
Liberal	Jennifer Ketsa		%
Alberta Party	Chinwe Okelu		
NDP	Rod Loyola		%
Total			100%

== See also ==
- List of Alberta provincial electoral districts
- Canadian provincial electoral districts
