= Rod Loyola =

Canadian politician (born 1974)

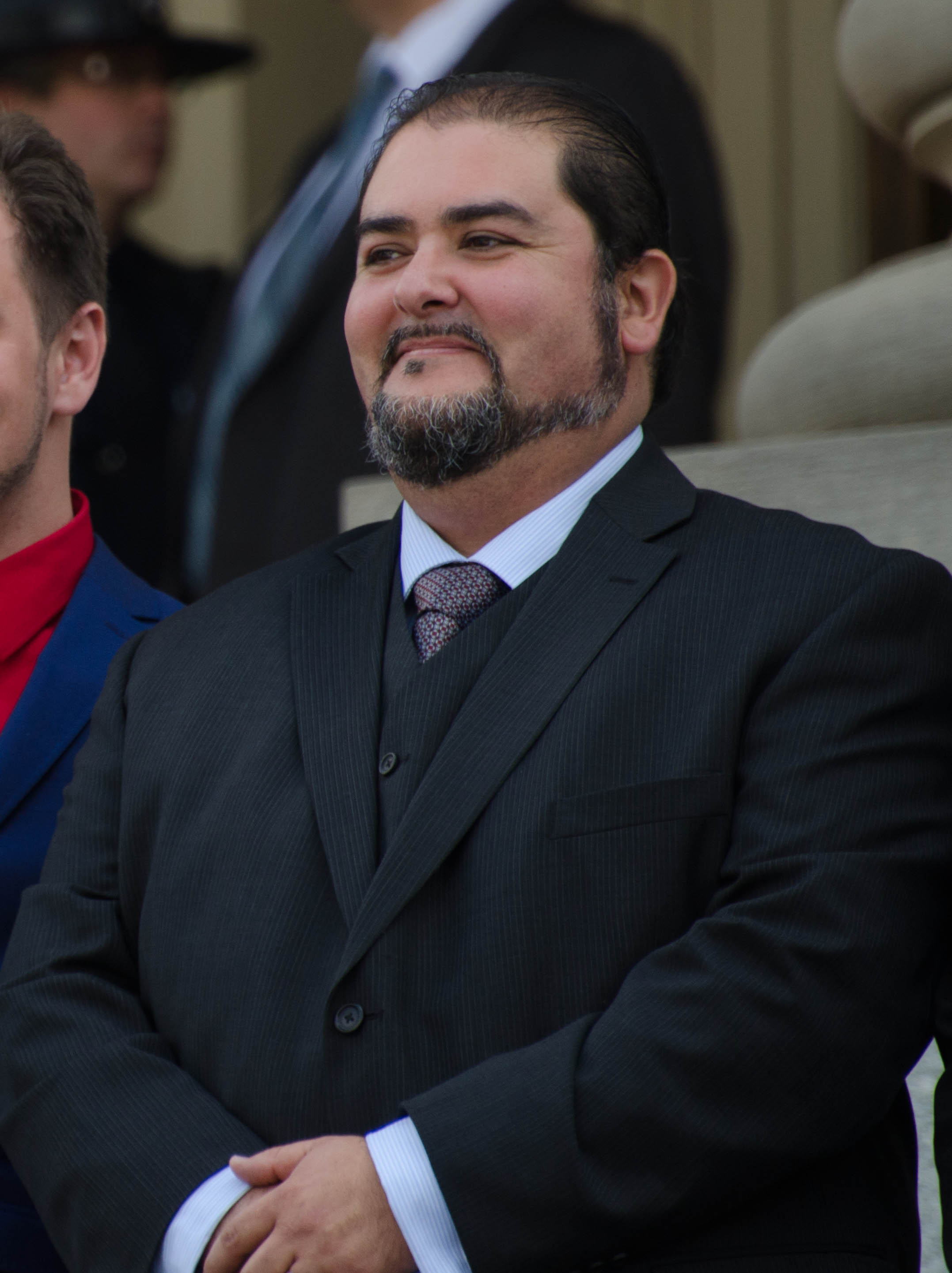
- Loyola in 2015

Member of the Legislative Assembly of Alberta for Edmonton-Ellerslie
- In office May 5, 2015 – March 25, 2025
- Preceded by: Naresh Bhardwaj
- Succeeded by: Gurtej Singh Brar

Personal details
- Born: February 28, 1974 (age 52) Santiago, Chile
- Party: Alberta New Democratic Party (provincial); Independent (federal)
- Other political affiliations: Liberal Party of Canada (federal, until 2025)
- Occupation: Union President, Labour Organizer

Rodrigo Alonso Loyola Salas (born February 28, 1974) is a Canadian politician who was elected in the 2015 Alberta general election to the Legislative Assembly of Alberta representing the electoral district of Edmonton-Ellerslie and re-elected on April 16, 2019. He won a third term on May 29, 2023. Loyola had previously contested the same seat for the same party in the 2012 Alberta general election. In 2014, prior to being elected as an MLA, he ran for leader of the Alberta New Democratic Party. He placed third in the 2014 Alberta NDP leadership race. Loyola resigned his seat in March 2025 to run in the federal election as the Liberal candidate for the newly formed Edmonton Gateway riding, but was removed as a candidate in early April due to comments supporting Hamas and Hezbollah in 2009. He later stated that he would run as an independent candidate.

== Early life ==
Loyola was born in Santiago, Chile during the rise of the dictatorship of Augusto Pinochet. He and his family left the country in 1976 and immigrated to Canada when he was two years old. They settled in Mill Woods, a neighbourhood in the south side of Edmonton.

Loyola and his family were part of the first wave of Latin American arrivals to Edmonton. His family had hoped to one day return to Chile, but instead they established themselves in the Mill Woods community. Conditions in Loyola's country of origin were not safe. Before fleeing to Canada, his father broke curfew to get milk for his family and was opened fire upon by soldiers on the way home. According to Loyola, his father had an independent streak and did not want to be seen as a "hindrance to the system". As a result, he did not apply for social assistance and, in one instance, took out a bank loan to pay for winter coats.

Growing up in Edmonton, Loyola developed an interest in poetry, hip-hop, and the arts. In the 2000s, he collaborated with Vlad Gomex and Cristian Cousino to form the Chilean-Canadian hip-hop group People's Poets. They released one album, No Life Without Roots, in 2009.

Loyola graduated in 1999 with a Bachelors of Arts from the University of Alberta where he studied anthropology and Latin American history. In 2007, he returned to the U of A where he worked as an academic program coordinator and student advisor. In 2013, Loyola was elected President of the Non-Academic Staff Association, the union representing support staff workers at the University of Alberta.

== Political career ==
=== 2014 Alberta NDP leadership race ===
On July 21, 2014, Rod Loyola announced his intention to run as leader of the Alberta New Democratic Party. He competed for the spot alongside David Eggen and Rachel Notley. Upon making this announcement, he wanted to focus on making sure that vulnerable and marginalized populations, including Indigenous people and newcomers to Canada, were better represented in the legislature. He also was concerned about privatization of public services and the harmful impacts of cuts to education, which Loyola believed worsens inequality in society.

In the results of the leadership vote held on October 18, 2014, Rachel Notley ultimately prevailed with 70 percent of the vote, David Eggen in second place, and Loyola placing third.

=== MLA for Edmonton-Ellerslie ===
Since first being elected as a Member of the Legislative Assembly of Alberta in 2015, Loyola has served on a number of Legislative Committees, which include Public Accounts, Resource Stewardship, Alberta Heritage Savings Trust Fund, Ethics and Accountability, Privileges and Elections, Legislative Offices, and Alberta's Economic Future.

As MLA, he advocated on behalf of his constituents to allow turban-wearing Sikhs the right to ride motorcycles without helmets. Brian Mason, then Minister of Transportation, granted an exemption on religious grounds in 2018.

An avid soccer fan, Loyola wanted the Alberta Gaming and Liquor Commission to temporarily extend the hours that licensed bars and restaurants can be open to serve patrons during the 2018 World Cup games so they could enjoy seeing the game live. Joe Ceci, then the Minister of Finance, approved the temporary extension in time for the games.

In 2021, Loyola also successfully advocated for his constituents with cystic fibrosis to grant access to new life-saving drugs like Trikafta, making sure it's on the list of Alberta-approved drugs.

After the Alberta New Democratic Party shifted from being in government to Official Opposition in 2019, Loyola has served in a number of shadow cabinet roles. Between 2019 and 2021, Loyola served as Critic for Transportation. As Transportation critic, he advocated on behalf of the survivors of the Humboldt Broncos bus crash for better safety standards for bus seatbelts and training requirements for truck drivers.

As an MLA representing a riding in the south side of Edmonton, he has advocated for the construction of a new hospital in south Edmonton, which has been met with delays ever since the United Conservative Party took power in 2019.

Following the 2023 Alberta general election, Loyola was named Alberta's Economic Future Committee Deputy Chair. After Naheed Nenshi was elected leader of the Alberta NDP in 2024, Loyola was named co-chair of Outreach as part of the Leader's Senior Advisory Team.

Loyola resigned his seat on March 25, 2025, and announced he would be running in the 2025 Canadian federal election, as the Liberal candidate for the newly formed electoral district of Edmonton Gateway riding. The by-election to replace him is scheduled for June 23, 2025. Loyola was removed as a candidate by the Liberal Party on April 3, 2025, after comments in 2009 supporting Hamas and Hezbollah, listed terrorist organizations in Canada, surfaced in the media.

== Personal life ==
Loyola is married with two sons. In 2018, Loyola converted to Islam after extensive research on the faith.

Loyola has served on the board of Friends of Medicare, volunteered for the Knottwood Community League, and the Post-Secondary Education Task Force for Public Interest Alberta. He was also a founding member of the Mill Woods Artists Collective, executive board member of the Memoria Viva Society of Edmonton, and was a producer of the Shaw Television Community Program, "Nosotros."

== Electoral history ==
=== Federal election ===
2025 Canadian federal election: Edmonton Gateway
Party	Candidate	Votes	%	±%	Expenditures
Conservative	Tim Uppal	26,385	50.59	+7.47	$126,243.67
Liberal	Jeremy Hoefsloot	19,435	37.27	+11.86	$12,760.61
New Democratic	Madeline Mayes	2,565	4.92	–20.40	$2,160.09
No affiliation	Rod Loyola	2,455	4.71	–	$32,467.65
Independent	Ashok Patel	838	1.61	–	none listed
People's	Paul Edward McCormack	474	0.91	–4.75	$327.13
Total valid votes/expense limit		52,152	99.16	–	$126,069.77
Total rejected ballots		442	0.84	–	
Turnout		52,594	68.06	–	
Eligible voters		77,277			
Conservative notional hold		Swing		–2.20	
Source: Elections Canada

=== Alberta general elections ===
2023 Alberta general election: Edmonton-Ellerslie
Party	Candidate	Votes	%	±%
New Democratic	Rod Loyola	11,429	61.75	+10.80
United Conservative	Ranjit Bath	6,817	36.83	-1.08
Wildrose Loyalty Coalition	Angela Stretch	264	1.43	–
Total		18,510	99.42	–
Rejected and declined		206	1.10	+0.25
Turnout		18,716	56.24	-9.41
Eligible voters		33,278		
New Democratic hold		Swing		▲5.94
Source(s) Source: Elections Alberta

2019 Alberta general election: Edmonton-Ellerslie
Party	Candidate	Votes	%	±%
New Democratic	Rod Loyola	9,717	50.95	-10.68
United Conservative	Sanjay Patel	7,230	37.91	+5.50
Alberta Party	Hazelyn Williams	1,273	6.67	+6.66
Liberal	Mike McGowan	390	2.04	-3.89
Alberta Advantage	Yash Sharma	263	1.38	–
Alberta Independence	Brian S. Lockyer	199	1.04	–
Total		19,072	98.93	–
Rejected, spoiled and declined		163	0.85	
Turnout		19,235	65.66	
Eligible voters		29,297		
New Democratic hold		Swing		-8.09
Source(s) Source: "31 - Edmonton-Ellerslie, 2019 Alberta general election". officialresults.elections.ab.ca. Elections Alberta. Alberta. Chief Electoral Officer (2019). 2019 General Election. A Report of the Chief Electoral Officer. Volume II (PDF) (Report). Vol. 2. Edmonton, Alta.: Elections Alberta. pp. 120–123. ISBN 978-1-988620-12-1.

2015 Alberta general election: Edmonton-Ellerslie
Party	Candidate	Votes	%	±%
New Democratic	Rod Loyola	11,034	61.57	+45.57
Progressive Conservative	Harman Kandola	3,549	19.80	-23.16
Wildrose	Jackie Lovely	2,499	13.94	-10.71
Liberal	Mike McGowan	839	4.68	-6.70
Total		17,921	99.30	–
Rejected, spoiled and declined		127	0.70	-0.47
Turnout		18,048	52.67	+2.63
Eligible voters		34,266		
New Democratic gain from Progressive Conservative		Swing		+34.37
Source(s) Source: "33 - Edmonton-Ellerslie, 2015 Alberta general election". officialresults.elections.ab.ca. Elections Alberta. Chief Electoral Officer (2016). 2015 General Election. A Report of the Chief Electoral Officer (PDF) (Report). Edmonton, Alta.: Elections Alberta.

2012 Alberta general election: Edmonton-Ellerslie
Party	Candidate	Votes	%	±%
Progressive Conservative	Naresh Bhardwaj	5,677	42.97	+1.06
Wildrose Alliance	Jackie Lovely	3,258	24.66	+20.35
New Democratic	Rod Loyola	2,114	16.00	-1.30
Liberal	Jennifer Ketsa	1,504	11.38	-21.47
Alberta Party	Chinwe Okelu	523	3.96	–
Independent	Athena Bernal-Born	137	1.04	–
Total		13,213	98.83	–
Rejected, spoiled and declined		157	1.17	+0.44
Turnout		13,370	50.04	+14.87
Eligible voters		26,721		
Progressive Conservative hold		Swing		-9.64
Source(s) Source: "33 - Edmonton-Ellerslie, 2012 Alberta general election". officialresults.elections.ab.ca. Elections Alberta. Chief Electoral Officer (2012). The Report of the Chief Electoral Officer on the 2011 Provincial Enumeration and Monday, April 23, 2012 Provincial General Election of the Twenty-eighth Legislative Assembly (PDF) (Report). Edmonton, Alta.: Elections Alberta. Archived (PDF) from the original on May 6, 2021.
