= Gene Zwozdesky =

Canadian politician (1948–2019)

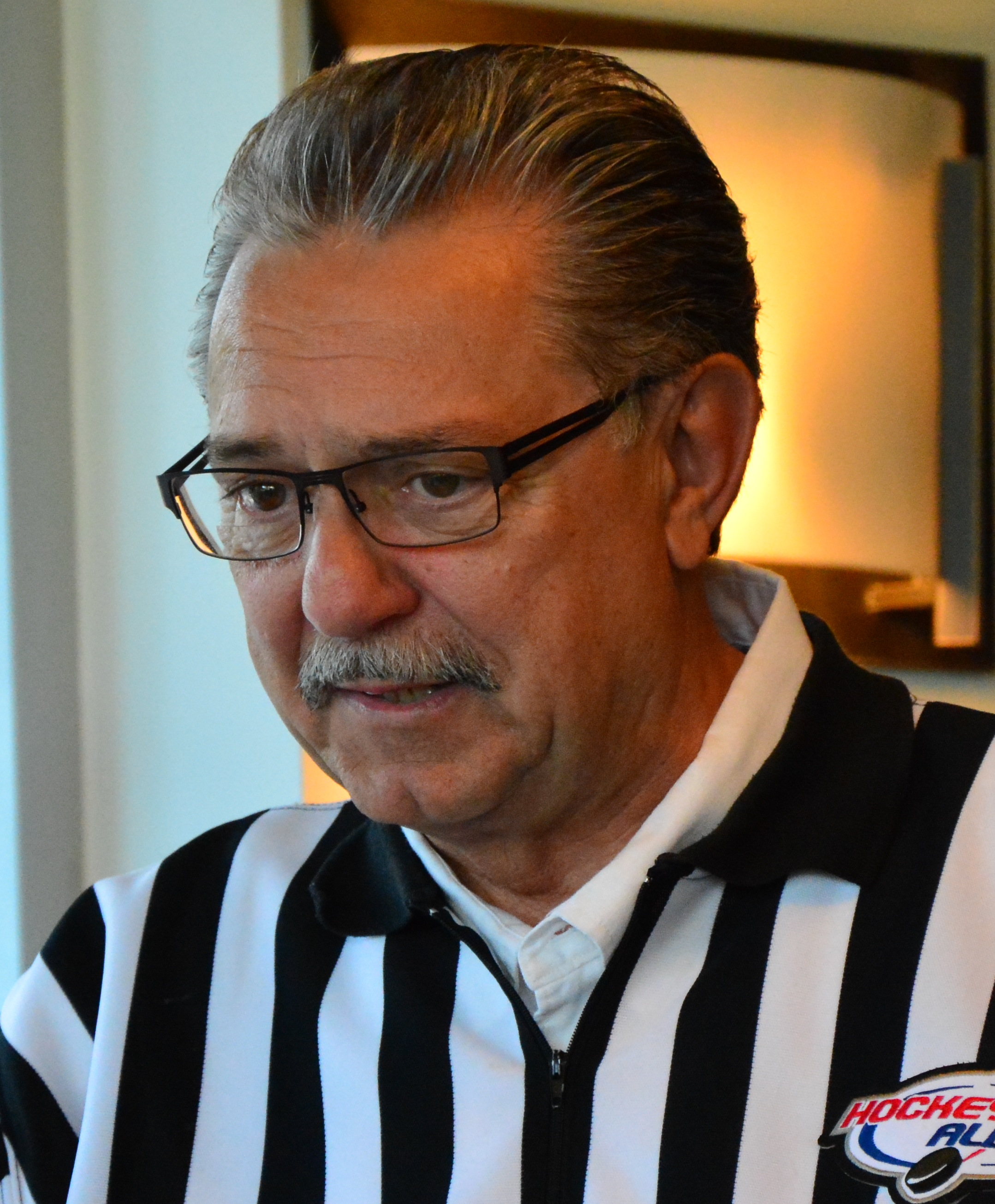
- Zwozdesky at a charity function in June 2013

12th Speaker of the Alberta Legislative Assembly
- In office May 23, 2012 – June 11, 2015
- Preceded by: Ken Kowalski
- Succeeded by: Bob Wanner

MLA for Edmonton-Mill Creek
- In office 1997–2015
- Preceded by: New District
- Succeeded by: Denise Woollard

MLA for Edmonton-Avonmore
- In office 1993–1997
- Preceded by: Marie Laing
- Succeeded by: District Abolished

Personal details
- Born: July 24, 1948 Nipawin, Saskatchewan, Canada
- Died: January 6, 2019 (aged 70) Edmonton, Alberta, Canada
- Party: Progressive Conservative
- Other political affiliations: Liberal (1993–1998)
- Spouse: Christine Zwozdesky
- Children: 2
- Occupation: Teacher

Eugene Zwozdesky MLA (July 24, 1948 – January 6, 2019) was a Canadian politician in the province of Alberta. He served in the Legislative Assembly of Alberta from 1993 to 2015, and was the Speaker of the Legislative Assembly from 2012 to 2015.

== Early life ==
Zwozdesky was born on July 24, 1948, in Nipawin, Saskatchewan, to Ukrainian-Canadian parents Alec and Anna Zwozdesky and came to Alberta at the age of two. He lived in Grand Centre, Hinton and Sangudo before moving to Edmonton, where he lived since 1963. After attending Victoria Composite High School, he obtained bachelor's degrees in arts and education from the University of Alberta. Before becoming involved in politics, Zwozdesky worked as a teacher, administrator, professional musician, and businessman.

== Political career ==
Zwozdesky was first elected in the 1993 Alberta general election as the Alberta Liberal Party's candidate, defeating incumbent Marie Laing of the Alberta New Democratic Party. He was re-elected to the new riding of Edmonton-Mill Creek in the 1997 Alberta general election.

In July 1998, he left the Liberal Party caucus and sat as an Independent member after a dispute over fiscal policy. He joined the governing Progressive Conservatives a month later. In the 2001 Alberta general election, he won by a generous margin over the Liberal challenger Bharat Agnihotri.

Zwozdesky was appointed to the cabinet as Minister of Community Development; after being re-elected in the 2004 Alberta general election, he was appointed Minister of Education.

On December 15, 2006, Zwozdesky was replaced in Premier Ed Stelmach's cabinet by Ron Liepert. He again joined the Alberta Cabinet on June 27, 2007, as Associate Minister for Capital Planning. In 2008, he was the Minister of Aboriginal Relations and Deputy Government House Leader. He was also co-chair of the Advisory Council on Alberta-Ukraine Relations, co-chair of the Cabinet Policy Committee on Public Safety and Services, and a member of the Standing Committee on Privileges and Elections, Standing Orders and Printing.

Zwozdesky has won numerous awards from cultural and arts organizations, as well as the 2005 Alberta Centennial Medal.

Zwozdesky was re-elected in the 2012 provincial election as an incumbent PC candidate. He was defeated in the 2015 Alberta general election by Alberta NDP candidate Denise Woollard.

== Personal life and death ==
Zwozdesky joined the Ukrainian Shumka Dancers in 1963, and danced in the troupe for six years before becoming the musical director, composing and conducting Shumka's music for twenty-five years; he also served in the same role for the Cheremosh Ukrainian Dance Company. He was involved in various other cultural organizations, was the executive director of the Alberta Cultural Heritage Foundation and the Alberta Ukrainian Canadian Centennial Commission, and has served on various voluntary boards. He was married to Christine, with two children.

He died of cancer on January 6, 2019, aged 70.

== Electoral record ==
1993 Alberta general election: Edmonton-Avonmore
Party	Candidate	Votes	%	±%
Liberal	Gene Zwozdesky	6,728	52.67%	24.59%
Progressive Conservative	Ken Alyluia	3,433	26.88%	-3.33%
New Democratic	Marie Laing	2,190	17.15%	-24.56%
Social Credit	Leslie M. Jackson	285	2.23%	–
Greens	Dennis Clark	97	0.76%	–
Natural Law	Lucia Hoff	40	0.31%	–
Total		12,773	–	–
Rejected, spoiled, and declined		28	–	–
Eligible electors / turnout		22,055	58.04%	–
Liberal gain from New Democratic		Swing		7.15%
Source(s) Source: "Edmonton-Avonmore Official Results 1993 Alberta general election". Alberta Heritage Community Foundation.

1997 Alberta general election: Edmonton-Mill Creek
Party	Candidate	Votes	%	±%
Liberal	Gene Zwozdesky	6,757	51.91%	–
Progressive Conservative	Sukhi Randhawa	3,679	28.27%	–
New Democratic	Stephen Crocker	1,804	13.86%	–
Social Credit	Christie Forget	776	5.96%	–
Total		13,016	–	–
Rejected, spoiled and declined		18	–	–
Eligible electors / turnout		23,216	56.14%	–
Liberal pickup new district.				
Source(s) Source: "Edmonton-Mill Creek Official Results 1997 Alberta general election". Alberta Heritage Community Foundation. "1997 General Election". Elections Alberta.

2001 Alberta general election: Edmonton-Mill Creek
Party	Candidate	Votes	%	±%
Progressive Conservative	Gene Zwozdesky	8,085	55.67%	27.40%
Liberal	Bharat Agnihotri	4,229	29.12%	-22.80%
New Democratic	Edwin Villania	1,893	13.03%	-0.83%
Alberta First	Kyle Harvey	220	1.51%	–
Greens	Harlan Light	97	0.67%	–
Total		14,524	–	–
Rejected, spoiled and declined		41	–	–
Eligible electors / turnout		26,307	55.37%	-0.78%
Progressive Conservative gain from Liberal		Swing		1.45%
Source(s) Source: "Edmonton-Mill Creek Official Results 2001 Alberta general election". Alberta Heritage Community Foundation.

2004 Alberta general election: Edmonton-Mill Creek
Party	Candidate	Votes	%	±%
Progressive Conservative	Gene Zwozdesky	5,070	42.08%	-13.59%
Liberal	Aman Gill	4,289	35.60%	6.48%
New Democratic	Nathan Taylor	1,709	14.18%	1.15%
Alberta Alliance	Robert J. Alford	523	4.34%	–
Greens	Eric Stieglitz	386	3.20%	2.54%
Independent	Cameron Johnson	72	0.60%	–
Total		12,049	–	–
Rejected, spoiled and declined		50	–	–
Eligible electors / turnout		24,419	49.55%	-5.82%
Progressive Conservative hold		Swing		-10.03%
Source(s) Source: "Edmonton-Mill Creek Official Results 2004 Alberta general election". Alberta Heritage Community Foundation. "Edmonton-Mill Creek Statement of Official Results 2004 Alberta general election" (PDF). Elections Alberta.

2008 Alberta general election: Edmonton-Mill Creek
Party	Candidate	Votes	%	±%
Progressive Conservative	Gene Zwozdesky	6,857	50.78%	8.70%
Liberal	Aman Gill	4,058	30.05%	-5.55%
New Democratic	Stephen Anderson	1,822	13.49%	-0.69%
Green	Glen Argan	726	5.38%	–
Communist	Naomi Rankin	41	0.30%	–
Total		13,504	–	–
Rejected, spoiled and declined		90	–	–
Eligible electors / turnout		29,773	45.66%	-3.89%
Progressive Conservative hold		Swing		7.12%
Source(s) Source: The Report on the March 3, 2008 Provincial General Election of the Twenty-seventh Legislative Assembly. Elections Alberta. May 28, 2020. pp. 320–323.

2012 Alberta general election: Edmonton-Mill Creek
Party	Candidate	Votes	%	±%
Progressive Conservative	Gene Zwozdesky	6,623	55.06%	4.28%
Wildrose	Adam Corsaut	2,193	18.23%	–
Liberal	Mike Butler	1,640	13.63%	-16.42%
New Democratic	Evelinne Teichgraber	1,336	11.11%	-2.39%
Alberta Party	Judy Wilson	194	1.61%	–
Communist	Naomi Rankin	43	0.36%	0.05%
Total		12,029	–	–
Rejected, spoiled and declined		117	–	–
Eligible electors / turnout		25,250	48.10%	2.44%
Progressive Conservative hold		Swing		8.05%
Source(s) Source: "Elections Alberta 2012 General Election". Elections Alberta. "40 - Edmonton-Mill Creek". officialresults.elections.ab.ca. Elections Alberta.

2015 Alberta general election: Edmonton-Mill Creek
Party	Candidate	Votes	%	±%
New Democratic	Denise Woollard	9,025	55.94%	44.83%
Progressive Conservative	Gene Zwozdesky	3,848	23.85%	-31.21%
Liberal	Harpreet Gill	1,896	11.75%	-1.88%
Wildrose	Saqib Raja	1,365	8.46%	-9.77%
Total		16,134	–	–
Rejected, spoiled and declined		59	–	–
Eligible electors / turnout		32,521	49.79%	1.69%
New Democratic gain from Progressive Conservative		Swing		-2.37%
Source(s) Source: "Elections Alberta 2015 General Election". Elections Alberta. "40 - Edmonton-Mill Creek". officialresults.elections.ab.ca. Elections Alberta.
