= Edmonton-Mill Creek =

Defunct provincial electoral district in Alberta, Canada

Coordinates: 53.49°N 113.38°W

Alberta electoral district
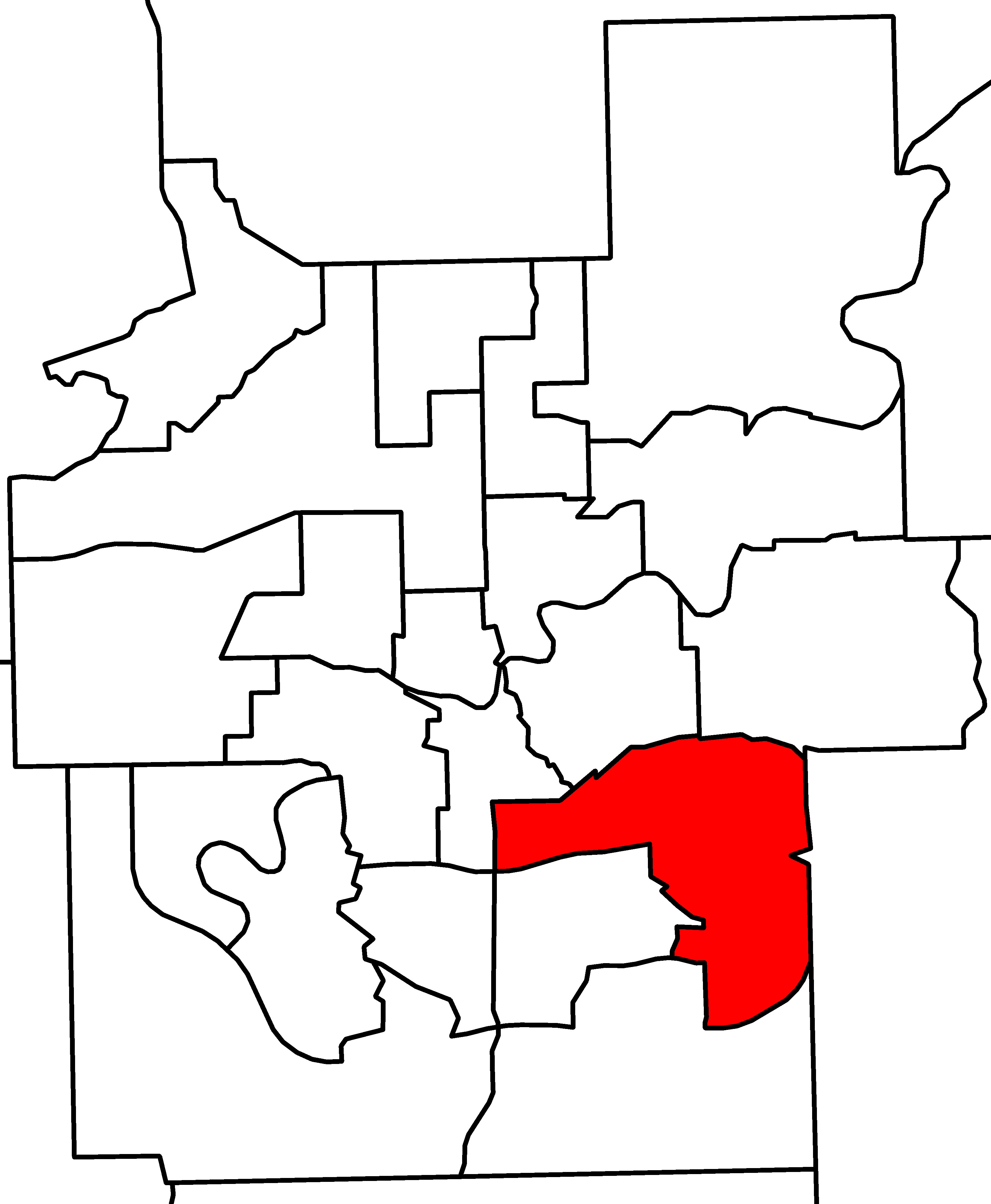
- 2010 boundaries

Defunct provincial electoral district
- Legislature: Legislative Assembly of Alberta
- District created: 1996
- District abolished: 2019
- First contested: 1997
- Last contested: 2015

Edmonton Mill Creek was a provincial electoral district in Alberta, Canada, mandated to return a single member to the Legislative Assembly of Alberta using the first past the post method of voting from 1997 to 2019.

== History ==
Edmonton-Mill Creek electoral district was created in the 1996 boundary redistribution from the old electoral district of Edmonton-Avonmore and a small part of Edmonton-Gold Bar electoral districts, and named for the Mill Creek Ravine which runs through Edmonton. The 2010 electoral boundary re-distribution saw the riding boundaries shift southwards. The 2003 south boundaries which ended at 23 Avenue were moved further south into Edmonton-Mill Woods and Edmonton-Ellerslie to end at Anthony Henday Drive. The northern boundaries of the riding were also pushed south from 92 Avenue to the Sherwood Park Freeway at its most northern point.

The district was abolished in 2017 when the Electoral Boundaries Commission recommended renaming Edmonton-Mill Creek to Edmonton-Meadows, reflecting a change in boundaries that "leaves the part of Mill Creek most well-known to Edmontonians in the constituency of Edmonton-Gold Bar".

=== Boundary history ===
37 Edmonton-Mill Creek 2003 boundaries
Bordering districts
North	East	West	South
Edmonton-Gold Bar, Edmonton-Strathcona and Sherwood Park	Strathcona	Edmonton-Strathcona	Edmonton-Ellerslie, Edmonton-Mill Woods and Edmonton-Rutherford
riding map goes here			
Legal description from the Electoral Divisions Act, S.A. 2003, c. E-4.1
Starting at the intersection of Gateway Boulevard with Whyte Avenue (82 Avenue); then 1. east along Whyte Avenue (82 Avenue) to 75 Street; 2. north along 75 Street to 90 Avenue; 3. east along 90 Avenue to 50 Street; 4. north along 50 Street to 92 Avenue; 5. east along 92 Avenue to the east Edmonton city boundary; 6. south, east and south along the east city boundary to 23 Avenue; 7. west along 23 Avenue to Mill Creek; 8. in a northwesterly direction along Mill Creek to 50 Street; 9. north along 50 Street to Whitemud Drive; 10. west along Whitemud Drive to Gateway Boulevard; 11. north along Gateway Boulevard to the starting point.
Note:

40 Edmonton-Mill Creek 2010 boundaries
Bordering districts
North	East	West	South
Edmonton-Gold Bar, Edmonton-Strathcona and Sherwood Park	Strathcona-Sherwood Park	Edmonton-Rutherford and Edmonton Strathcona	Edmonton-Ellerslie and Edmonton-Mill Woods
Legal description from the Statutes of Alberta 2010, Electoral Divisions Act.
Note:

Members of the Legislative Assembly for Edmonton-Mill Creek
Assembly	Years	Member	Party
See Edmonton-Avonmore and Edmonton-Gold Bar 1971-1997
24th	1997-1998	Gene Zwozdesky	Liberal
24th	1998	Gene Zwozdesky	Independent
24th	1998-2001	Gene Zwozdesky	Progressive; Conservative
25th	2001-2004	Gene Zwozdesky	Progressive; Conservative
26th	2004-2008	Gene Zwozdesky	Progressive; Conservative
27th	2008–2015	Gene Zwozdesky	Progressive; Conservative
29th	2015–2019	Denise Woollard	New Democrat
See Edmonton-Meadows 2019-

=== Electoral history ===
The electoral district was created in 1997 largely from the old electoral district of Edmonton-Avonmore. That district had become a swing riding through the 1980s and 90s being won by candidates from three different parties. The incumbent Gene Zwozdesky had previously represented Avonmore winning his first term in office in 1993.

Zwozdesky won his first term representing Mill Creek as a Liberal candidate. A year later in 1998 he had a high-profile falling out with the Liberal party and left the caucus to sit as an independent. He joined the Progressive Conservative caucus a short time later and was re-elected under that banner in 2001.

Starting in 1999 Zwozdesky was appointed to his first portfolio as a junior minister. In total he has held six different ministerial portfolios in the governments of Ralph Klein and Ed Stelmach with his last portfolio ending in 2011. Zwozdesky was defeated in the 2015 Alberta general election by Alberta NDP candidate Denise Woollard.

== Legislative election results ==
=== 1997 ===
1997 Alberta general election
Party	Candidate	Votes	%	±%
Liberal	Gene Zwozdesky	6,757	51.91%	–
Progressive Conservative	Sukhi Randhawa	3,679	28.27%	–
New Democratic	Stephen Crocker	1,804	13.86%	–
Social Credit	Christie Forget	776	5.96%	–
Total		13,016	–	–
Rejected, spoiled and declined		18	–	–
Eligible electors / turnout		23,216	56.14%	–
Liberal pickup new district.				
Source(s) Source: "Edmonton-Mill Creek Official Results 1997 Alberta general election". Alberta Heritage Community Foundation. "1997 General Election". Elections Alberta.

=== 2001 ===
2001 Alberta general election
Party	Candidate	Votes	%	±%
Progressive Conservative	Gene Zwozdesky	8,085	55.67%	27.40%
Liberal	Bharat Agnihotri	4,229	29.12%	-22.80%
New Democratic	Edwin Villania	1,893	13.03%	-0.83%
Alberta First	Kyle Harvey	220	1.51%	–
Greens	Harlan Light	97	0.67%	–
Total		14,524	–	–
Rejected, spoiled and declined		41	–	–
Eligible electors / turnout		26,307	55.37%	-0.78%
Progressive Conservative gain from Liberal		Swing		1.45%
Source(s) Source: "Edmonton-Mill Creek Official Results 2001 Alberta general election". Alberta Heritage Community Foundation.

=== 2004 ===
2004 Alberta general election
Party	Candidate	Votes	%	±%
Progressive Conservative	Gene Zwozdesky	5,070	42.08%	-13.59%
Liberal	Aman Gill	4,289	35.60%	6.48%
New Democratic	Nathan Taylor	1,709	14.18%	1.15%
Alberta Alliance	Robert J. Alford	523	4.34%	–
Greens	Eric Stieglitz	386	3.20%	2.54%
Independent	Cameron Johnson	72	0.60%	–
Total		12,049	–	–
Rejected, spoiled and declined		50	–	–
Eligible electors / turnout		24,419	49.55%	-5.82%
Progressive Conservative hold		Swing		-10.03%
Source(s) Source: "Edmonton-Mill Creek Official Results 2004 Alberta general election". Alberta Heritage Community Foundation. "Edmonton-Mill Creek Statement of Official Results 2004 Alberta general election" (PDF). Elections Alberta.

=== 2008 ===
2008 Alberta general election
Party	Candidate	Votes	%	±%
Progressive Conservative	Gene Zwozdesky	6,857	50.78%	8.70%
Liberal	Aman Gill	4,058	30.05%	-5.55%
New Democratic	Stephen Anderson	1,822	13.49%	-0.69%
Green	Glen Argan	726	5.38%	–
Communist	Naomi Rankin	41	0.30%	–
Total		13,504	–	–
Rejected, spoiled and declined		90	–	–
Eligible electors / turnout		29,773	45.66%	-3.89%
Progressive Conservative hold		Swing		7.12%
Source(s) Source: The Report on the March 3, 2008 Provincial General Election of the Twenty-seventh Legislative Assembly. Elections Alberta. May 28, 2020. pp. 320–323.

=== 2012 ===
2012 Alberta general election
Party	Candidate	Votes	%	±%
Progressive Conservative	Gene Zwozdesky	6,623	55.06%	4.28%
Wildrose	Adam Corsaut	2,193	18.23%	–
Liberal	Mike Butler	1,640	13.63%	-16.42%
New Democratic	Evelinne Teichgraber	1,336	11.11%	-2.39%
Alberta Party	Judy Wilson	194	1.61%	–
Communist	Naomi Rankin	43	0.36%	0.05%
Total		12,029	–	–
Rejected, spoiled and declined		117	–	–
Eligible electors / turnout		25,250	48.10%	2.44%
Progressive Conservative hold		Swing		8.05%
Source(s) Source: "Elections Alberta 2012 General Election". Elections Alberta. "40 - Edmonton-Mill Creek". officialresults.elections.ab.ca. Elections Alberta.

=== 2015 ===
2015 Alberta general election
Party	Candidate	Votes	%	±%
New Democratic	Denise Woollard	9,025	55.94%	44.83%
Progressive Conservative	Gene Zwozdesky	3,848	23.85%	-31.21%
Liberal	Harpreet Gill	1,896	11.75%	-1.88%
Wildrose	Saqib Raja	1,365	8.46%	-9.77%
Total		16,134	–	–
Rejected, spoiled and declined		59	–	–
Eligible electors / turnout		32,521	49.79%	1.69%
New Democratic gain from Progressive Conservative		Swing		-2.37%
Source(s) Source: "Elections Alberta 2015 General Election". Elections Alberta. "40 - Edmonton-Mill Creek". officialresults.elections.ab.ca. Elections Alberta.

== Senate nominee election results ==
=== 2004 ===
2004 Senate nominee election results: Edmonton-Mill Creek				Turnout 49.67%	
Affiliation	Candidate	Votes	% votes	% ballots	Rank
Progressive Conservative	Betty Unger	4,223	15.38%	46.08%	2
Independent	Link Byfield	3,423	12.47%	37.35%	4
Progressive Conservative	Bert Brown	3,065	11.17%	33.44%	1
Progressive Conservative	Cliff Breitkreuz	3,030	11.04%	33.06%	3
Independent	Tom Sindlinger	2,540	9.25%	27.71%	9
Alberta Alliance	Michael Roth	2,500	9.11%	27.28%	7
Progressive Conservative	David Usherwood	2,380	8.67%	25.97%	6
Alberta Alliance	Gary Horan	2,216	8.07%	24.18%	10
Alberta Alliance	Vance Gough	2,212	8.06%	24.14%	8
Progressive Conservative	Jim Silye	1,861	6.78%	20.31%	5
Total votes		27,450	100%		
Total ballots		9,165	3.00 votes per ballot		
Rejected, spoiled and declined		2,965			

Voters had the option of selecting four candidates on the ballot.

== Student vote results ==
=== 2004 ===
Participating schools
J. H. Picard School
W. P. Wagner School

On November 19, 2004, a student vote was conducted at participating Alberta schools to parallel the 2004 Alberta general election results. The vote was designed to educate students and simulate the electoral process for persons who had not yet reached the legal majority. The vote was conducted in 80 of the 83 provincial electoral districts, with students voting for actual election candidates. Schools with a large student body that reside in another electoral district had the option to vote for candidates outside of the electoral district than where they were physically located.

2004 Alberta student vote results
Affiliation	Candidate	Votes	%
NDP	Nathan Taylor	374	34.44%
Progressive Conservative	Gene Zwozdesky	351	32.32%
Liberal	Aman Gill	129	11.88%
Independent	Cameron Johnson	96	8.84%
Green	Eric Stieglitz	92	8.47%
Alberta Alliance	Robert Alford	44	4.05%
Total		1,086	100%
Rejected, spoiled and declined		48	

=== 2012 ===
2012 Alberta student vote results
Affiliation	Candidate	Votes	%
Progressive Conservative	Gene Zwozdesky		
Wildrose	Adam Corsaut		
Liberal	Mike Butler		
Alberta Party	Judy Wilson		
NDP	Evelinne Teichgrabber		
Communist	Naomi Rankin		
Total		12,044	100%

== See also ==
- List of Alberta provincial electoral districts
- Canadian provincial electoral districts
