= Naresh Bhardwaj =

Canadian politician

The Honourable Naresh Bhardwaj ECA
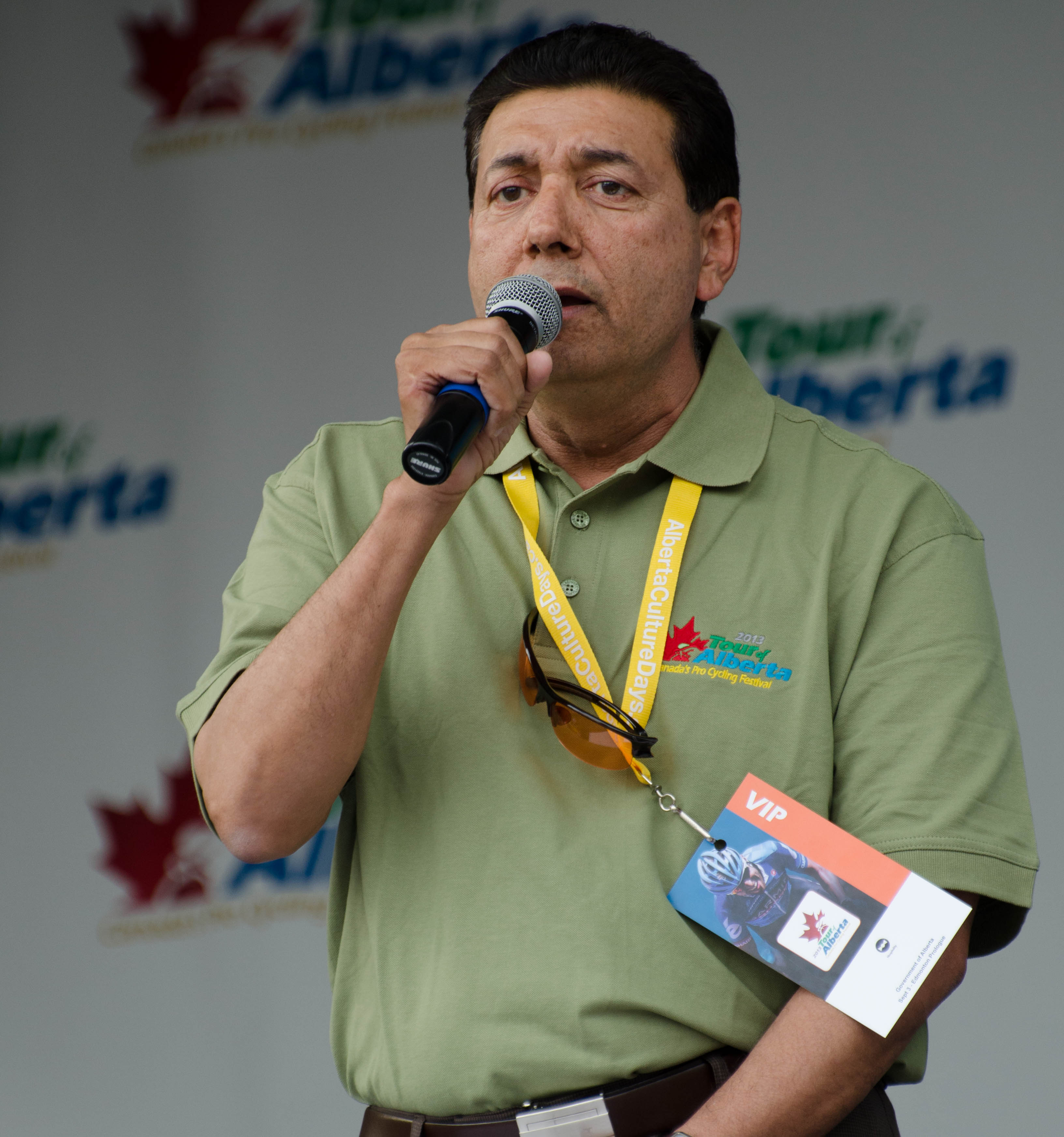
- Bhardwaj at the 2013 Tour of Alberta

Member of the Legislative Assembly of Alberta for Edmonton-Ellerslie
- In office March 3, 2008 – May 5, 2015
- Preceded by: Bharat Agnihotri
- Succeeded by: Rod Loyola

Personal details
- Born: 1959 (age 66–67)
- Party: United Conservative Party
- Other political affiliations: Progressive Conservative (previously)
- Website: unitedconservative.ca/naresh-bhardwaj/

Naresh Bhardwaj (born 1959) is a Canadian politician, who was elected in the 2008 provincial election to represent the electoral district of Edmonton-Ellerslie in the Legislative Assembly of Alberta. He was a member of the Progressive Conservatives. He was Associate Minister of Persons with Disabilities in the cabinet of Jim Prentice.

== Political career ==
Bhardwaj ran in the 2012 Alberta general election as an incumbent PC candidate, winning a second term on April 23, 2012.

He was made Associate Minister of Persons with disabilities in 2013. He did not run in the 2015 general election.

He was the United Conservative Party (UCP) candidate in the 2025 Edmonton-Ellerslie provincial by-election.

== Controversy ==
In March 2015, Bhardwaj was accused of offering a $10,000 bribe to prevent other candidates from challenging him in an election, however he was later cleared of any wrongdoing by an internal PC Party investigation, and the Edmonton Police Service closed their investigation without laying any charges.

At the time of the allegations, Rachel Notley, leader of the Alberta New Democratic Party, requested that Bhardwaj step down and submit to an investigation. In March 2015, Bhardwaj withdrew his name as a candidate for the 2015 general election, however he maintained his innocence in the matter in public statements.

== Electoral history ==
2008 Alberta general election: Edmonton-Ellerslie
Party	Candidate	Votes	%	±%
Progressive Conservative	Naresh Bhardwaj	4,581	41.90	+10.08
Liberal	Bharat Agnihotri	3,592	32.86	-0.94
New Democratic	Marilyn Assheton-Smith	1,891	17.30	-4.85
Wildrose Alliance	Krista Leddy	471	4.31	-5.59
Green	Paul J. Boos	335	3.06	–
Social Credit	Cheryl Ullah	62	0.57	-1.77
Total		10,932	99.26	–
Rejected, spoiled and declined		81	0.74	+0.13
Turnout		11,013	35.17	-8.37
Eligible voters		31,317		
Progressive Conservative gain from Liberal		Swing		+5.51
Source(s) Source: "30 - Edmonton-Ellerslie, 2008 Alberta general election". officialresults.elections.ab.ca. Elections Alberta. Chief Electoral Officer (2008). The Report on the March 3, 2008 Provincial General Election of the Twenty-Seventh Legislative Assembly (Report). Edmonton, Alta.: Elections Alberta. pp. 290–293.

2012 Alberta general election: Edmonton-Ellerslie
Party	Candidate	Votes	%	±%
Progressive Conservative	Naresh Bhardwaj	5,677	42.97	+1.06
Wildrose Alliance	Jackie Lovely	3,258	24.66	+20.35
New Democratic	Rod Loyola	2,114	16.00	-1.30
Liberal	Jennifer Ketsa	1,504	11.38	-21.47
Alberta Party	Chinwe Okelu	523	3.96	–
Independent	Athena Bernal-Born	137	1.04	–
Total		13,213	98.83	–
Rejected, spoiled and declined		157	1.17	+0.44
Turnout		13,370	50.04	+14.87
Eligible voters		26,721		
Progressive Conservative hold		Swing		-9.64
Source(s) Source: "33 - Edmonton-Ellerslie, 2012 Alberta general election". officialresults.elections.ab.ca. Elections Alberta. Chief Electoral Officer (2012). The Report of the Chief Electoral Officer on the 2011 Provincial Enumeration and Monday, April 23, 2012 Provincial General Election of the Twenty-eighth Legislative Assembly (PDF) (Report). Edmonton, Alta.: Elections Alberta. Archived (PDF) from the original on May 6, 2021.

Alberta provincial by-election, June 23, 2025: Edmonton-Ellerslie Resignation of Rod Loyola
** Preliminary results — Not yet official **
Party	Candidate	Votes	%	±%
New Democratic	Gurtej Singh Brar	4,327	50.84	-10.90
United Conservative	Naresh Bhardwaj	3,239	38.06	+1.23
Liberal	Manpreet Tiwana	410	4.82	–
Republican	Fred Munn	291	3.42	–
Alberta Party	Caroline Currie	203	2.39	–
Wildrose Loyalty Coalition	Pamela Henson	41	0.48	-0.94
Total valid votes		8,511		
Total rejected ballots				
Turnout				
Eligible voters				
New Democratic hold		Swing		-6.07
Source(s) Source: Elections Alberta
