= Bharat Agnihotri =

Canadian politician

MLA for Edmonton-Ellerslie
- In office November 22, 2004 – March 3, 2008
- Preceded by: Debby Carlson
- Succeeded by: Naresh Bhardwaj

Personal details
- Born: April 9, 1953 (age 73) India
- Party: Liberal
- Spouse: Rita
- Children: 2
- Education: Guru Nanak Dev University
- Occupation: Realtor

Bharat Agnihotri (born April 9, 1953) is a Canadian politician and a former member of the Legislative Assembly of Alberta. He represented the constituency of Edmonton-Ellerslie, sitting as a Liberal. He was elected in the 2004 election, but was defeated in the 2008 election.

== Early life ==
Agnihotri was born in India, and graduated from Guru Nanak Dev University in Amritsar with a Bachelor of Arts in Economics and Political Science. In 1976, he immigrated to England, where he lived until 1990, when he came to Edmonton. He began work as a realtor in 1997.

== Politics ==
=== Electoral record ===
Agnihotri first sought election in the 2001 provincial election, when he ran as a Liberal in Edmonton Mill Creek against incumbent Gene Zwozdesky. Zwozdesky had been elected as a Liberal the previous election, and Agnihotri had volunteered for his campaign. However, Zwozdesky had left the Liberal caucus in July 1998, and joined the Progressive Conservatives a month later, and it was under their banner that he was seeking re-election. Agnihotri finished second, with 29% of the vote, nearly four thousand votes behind Zwozdesky.

The next election, Agnihotri ran in Edmonton Ellerslie, which had been vacated by Liberal Debby Carlson, who had resigned to run in the 2004 federal election. Agnihotri won a narrow victory, finishing 199 votes ahead of Progressive Conservative Gurnam Dodd. He sought re-election in the 2008 election, but was defeated by the Progressive Conservative candidate.

=== Legislative initiatives ===
In 2007, Agnihotri sponsored the Freedom of Information and Protection of Privacy (Repeal of Ministerial Briefing Exemption) Amendment Act, would have eliminated ministerial briefings from the list of documents exempt from public disclosure under the province's access to information provisions. It never reached second reading.

=== Community Initiatives Program incident ===
On April 3, 2007, Agnihotri became the first MLA to be named—that is, asked by the Speaker to leave the assembly—in Ken Kowalski's nine years as speaker. This occurred as result of questions he asked Minister of Tourism, Parks, Recreation and Culture Hector Goudreau about the Community Initiatives Program, which dispenses grants to community groups. Agnihotri began by noting that, despite a rule that unmatched grants could not exceed ten thousand dollars, forty-three groups had received unmatched grants exceeding that amount. He then asked if these groups included any who had made donations to the leadership campaigns of Ed Stelmach, Dave Hancock, Lyle Oberg, or Ted Morton—all of whom were cabinet ministers and all of whom had refused to disclose full lists of donors from their leadership campaigns: "Can this minister assure this house that groups receiving this special treatment are not secret friends of top Tories?" Hancock rose on a point of order, and Kowalski ruled that Agnihotri's question impugned the integrity of the ministers, and that the question was a party matter that had no place in the legislature. He asked Agnihotri three times to apologize and, after Agnihotri refused, he named him. Agnihotri was not to be allowed back into the Legislature until he apologized and all members of the assembly agreed to re-admit him. He apologized the next day, saying that his constituents wanted him to and that "if you stay outside, you're not going to help Albertans, so better you go inside and fight for it."

== Post-political career ==
After his defeat in 2008, Agnihotri announced plans to return to work as a realtor.

== Personal life ==
Agnihotri is married to Rita and has two children. He enjoys cricket and table tennis.

== Election results ==
2001 Alberta general election: Edmonton-Mill Creek
Party	Candidate	Votes	%	±%
Progressive Conservative	Gene Zwozdesky	8,085	55.67%	27.40%
Liberal	Bharat Agnihotri	4,229	29.12%	-22.80%
New Democratic	Edwin Villania	1,893	13.03%	-0.83%
Alberta First	Kyle Harvey	220	1.51%	–
Greens	Harlan Light	97	0.67%	–
Total		14,524	–	–
Rejected, spoiled and declined		41	–	–
Eligible electors / turnout		26,307	55.37%	-0.78%
Progressive Conservative gain from Liberal		Swing		1.45%
Source(s) Source: "Edmonton-Mill Creek Official Results 2001 Alberta general election". Alberta Heritage Community Foundation.

2004 Alberta general election results (Edmonton Ellerslie)		Turnout 43.4%	
Affiliation	Candidate	Votes	%
Liberal	Bharat Agnihotri	3,444	33.8%
Progressive Conservative	Gurnam Dodd	3,245	31.9%
New Democratic	Marilyn Assheton-Smith	2,257	22.2%
Alberta Alliance	Eleanor Maroes	1,005	9.9%
Social Credit	Amelia Maciejewski	238	2.3%

2008 Alberta general election: Edmonton-Ellerslie
Party	Candidate	Votes	%	±%
Progressive Conservative	Naresh Bhardwaj	4,581	41.90	+10.08
Liberal	Bharat Agnihotri	3,592	32.86	-0.94
New Democratic	Marilyn Assheton-Smith	1,891	17.30	-4.85
Wildrose Alliance	Krista Leddy	471	4.31	-5.59
Green	Paul J. Boos	335	3.06	–
Social Credit	Cheryl Ullah	62	0.57	-1.77
Total		10,932	99.26	–
Rejected, spoiled and declined		81	0.74	+0.13
Turnout		11,013	35.17	-8.37
Eligible voters		31,317		
Progressive Conservative gain from Liberal		Swing		+5.51
Source(s) Source: "30 - Edmonton-Ellerslie, 2008 Alberta general election". officialresults.elections.ab.ca. Elections Alberta. Chief Electoral Officer (2008). The Report on the March 3, 2008 Provincial General Election of the Twenty-Seventh Legislative Assembly (Report). Edmonton, Alta.: Elections Alberta. pp. 290–293.
