= Marie Laing =

Canadian politician (1937–2023)

Member of the Legislative Assembly of Alberta for Edmonton–Avonmore
- In office 1986–1993
- Preceded by: Horst Schmid
- Succeeded by: Gene Zwozdesky

Personal details
- Born: Marie Jean Sprado; July 30, 1937 Stettler, Alberta, Canada
- Died: March 24, 2023 (aged 85) Edmonton, Alberta, Canada
- Party: Alberta New Democratic Party
- Education: University of Alberta
- Profession: Educator, psychologist

Marie Jean Laing (née Sprado; July 30, 1937 – March 24, 2023) was a member of the Legislative Assembly of Alberta from 1986 to 1993. She earned Ph.D. and R.Psych degrees from the University of Alberta.

== Political career ==
Laing represented the now-defunct southeast Edmonton riding of Edmonton-Avonmore for the Alberta New Democrats. She taught at the University of Alberta in Edmonton. Before her election she was active in the peace movement, and served as the Executive Director of the Edmonton Sexual Assault Centre.

Laing was narrowly elected in an upset during the 1986 election by just 93 votes defeating the PC incumbent Horst Schmid. She was part of a sweep of many Edmonton ridings by New Democrats.

As an MLA, she was noted for introducing feminist causes in the Legislature. Something she was less known for, Marie also supported treating lesbian and gay people as full citizens who deserved equal rights, and also legal protection from those that thought otherwise, including some even in her own caucus. She was re-elected in the 1989 Alberta general election by a wider margin, but was defeated by Gene Zwozdesky in the 1993 Alberta general election.

Throughout her career, Marie mentored many women, serving as a role model and inspiring them to progressive causes. After her time as an MLA, she began teaching and became the Executive Director of the WORTH Centre, which assisted women with addictions. She was published in journals dealing with Family Law, including her 1999 article For the Sake of the Children: Preventing Reckless New Laws. Laing died on March 24, 2023.
