= John G. Ashton =

Canadian politician

John Glyndwr Ashton

Member of the Legislative Assembly of Alberta
- In office 1971–1979
- Preceded by: New district
- Succeeded by: District abolished
- Constituency: Edmonton-Ottewell

Personal details
- Born: March 31, 1935 (age 91) Hanna, Alberta
- Party: Progressive Conservative

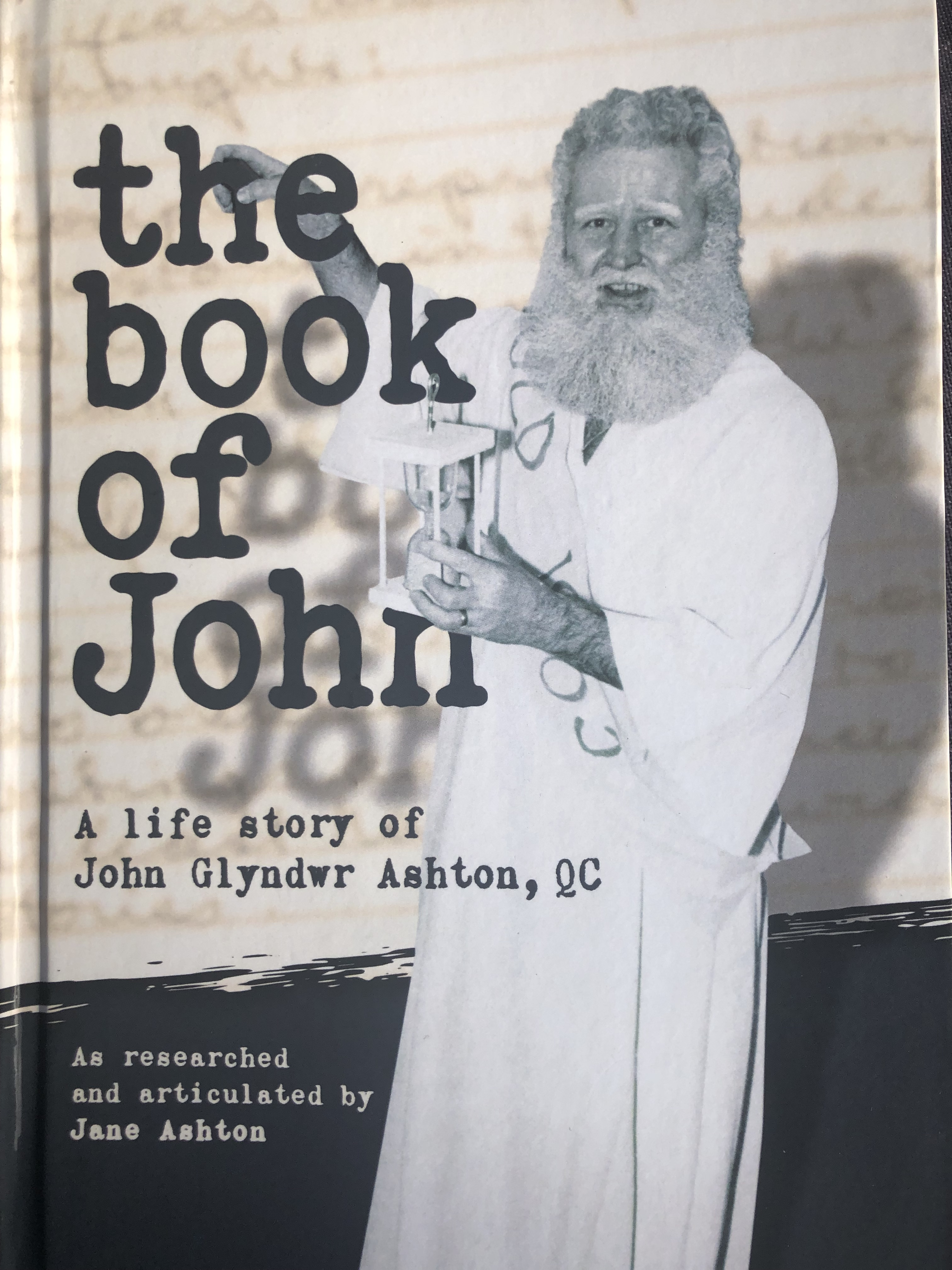
The Book of John: A Life Story of John Glyndwr Ashton

John Glyndwr Ashton (born March 31, 1935) was a provincial level politician from Alberta, Canada. He served as a member of the Legislative Assembly of Alberta from 1971 to 1979 sitting with the governing Progressive Conservative caucus.

== Political career ==
Ashton ran for a seat to the Alberta Legislature in the 1971 Alberta general election. He won the new electoral district of Edmonton-Ottewell in a landslide to pick it up for the Progressive Conservative party who went on to form government in that election.

Ashton ran for a second term in office in the 1975 Alberta general election. He won an even larger victory defeating two other candidates to hold his seat. He retired from provincial politics at dissolution of the Assembly in 1979.

During his time in provincial politics, Ashton fostered the creation of the Alberta Natural Resources Science Centre, a now defunct science center that operated from 1980-1988.

He is the current President of Sherwood Park Heritage Mile Society.

== Accomplishments ==
The Book of John: A Life Story of John Glyndwr Ashton, published in 2022, chronicles John Glyndwr Ashton's Life.
