= Edmonton-Ottewell =

Defunct provincial electoral district in Alberta, Canada

Alberta electoral district

Defunct provincial electoral district
- Legislature: Legislative Assembly of Alberta
- District created: 1971
- District abolished: 1979
- First contested: 1971
- Last contested: 1975

Edmonton-Ottewell was a provincial electoral district in Alberta, Canada, mandated to return a single member to the Legislative Assembly of Alberta using the first past the post method of voting from 1971 to 1979.

== History ==
=== Members of the Legislative Assembly (MLAs) ===
Members of the Legislative Assembly for Edmonton-Ottewell
Assembly	Years	Member	Party
See Clover Bar electoral district from 1930-1971, Strathcona East electoral district from 1959-1971 and Strathcona South electoral district from 1967-1971
17th	1971–1975	John G. Ashton	Progressive Conservative
18th	1975–1979	John G. Ashton	Progressive Conservative
See Edmonton-Sherwood Park electoral district from 1979-1986 and Edmonton-Mill Woods electoral district from 1979-Present

== Election results ==
=== 1971 ===
1971 Alberta general election
Party	Candidate	Votes	%	±%
Progressive Conservative	John G. Ashton	7,009	56.02%	–
Social Credit	Ronald Penner	4,188	33.47%	–
New Democratic	Donald Haythorne	1,314	10.50%	–
Total		12,511	–	–
Rejected, spoiled and declined		285	–	–
Eligible electors / turnout		16,407	77.99%	–
Progressive Conservative pickup new district.				
Source(s) Source: "Edmonton-Ottewell Official Results 1971 Alberta general election". Alberta Heritage Community Foundation.

=== 1975 ===
1975 Alberta general election
Party	Candidate	Votes	%	±%
Progressive Conservative	John G. Ashton	8,807	71.20%	15.18%
New Democratic	Jim Denholm	2,003	16.19%	5.69%
Social Credit	Irvine Zemrau	1,559	12.60%	-20.87%
Total		12,369	–	–
Rejected, spoiled and declined		62	–	–
Eligible electors / turnout		22,468	55.33%	–
Progressive Conservative hold		Swing		16.23%
Source(s) Source: "Edmonton-Ottewell Official Results 1975 Alberta general election". Alberta Heritage Community Foundation.

== See also ==
- List of Alberta provincial electoral districts
- Canadian provincial electoral districts
- Ottewell, a community in Edmonton
