= Bavarian Schuhplattlers of Edmonton =

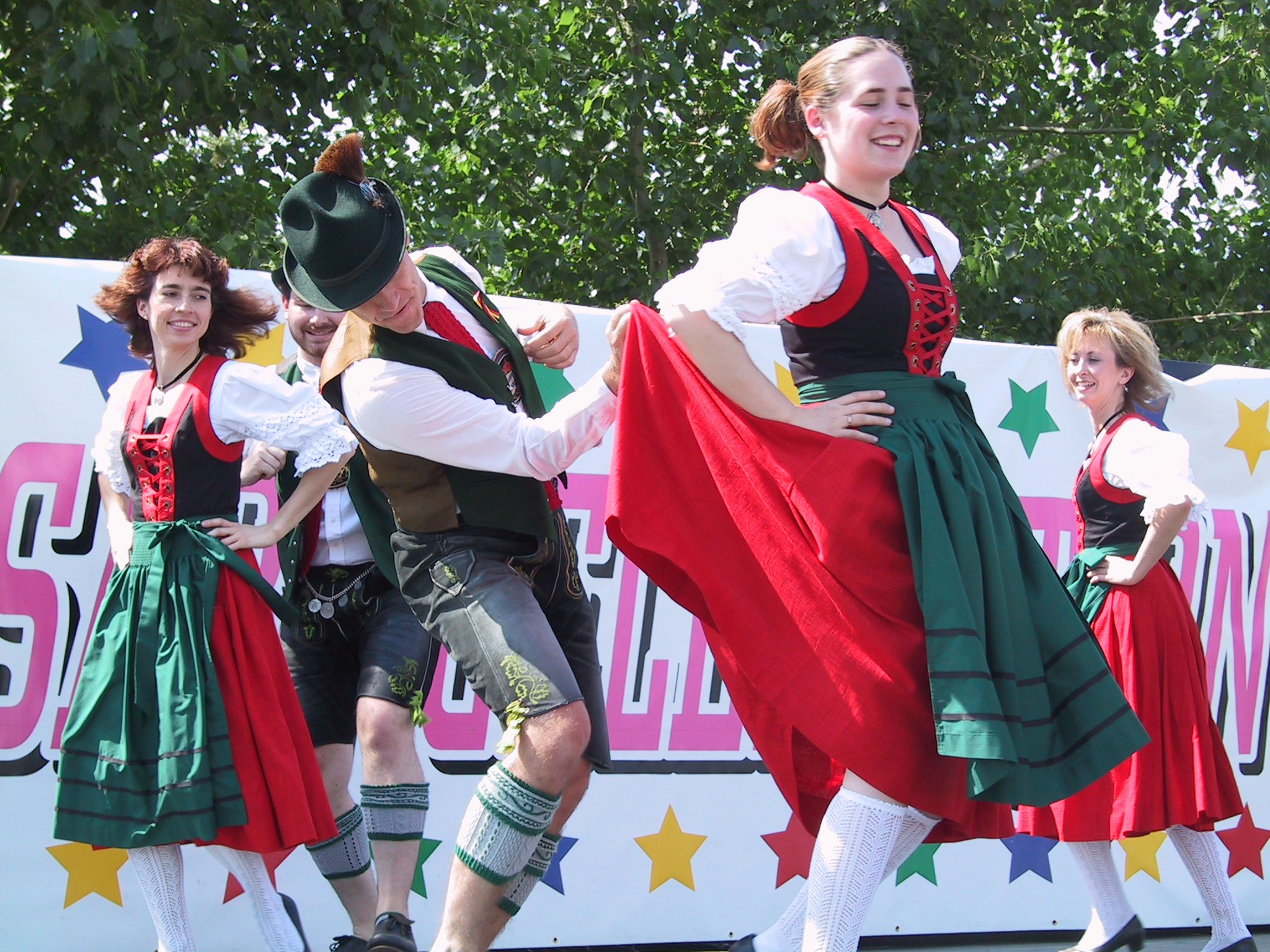
Bayrisch Guck dance performance of the Bavarian Schuhplattlers in 2002

The Bavarian Schuhplattlers of Edmonton preserve the German and Austrian tradition of folk-dancing and also provide an atmosphere of fun and Gemütlichkeit for their members. They have existed since 1971 in Edmonton, Alberta, Canada.

== History ==
External videos
- The Bavarian Schuhplattlers of Edmonton dance at the Heritage Festival in Edmonton 2012 on YouTube

The Bavarian Schuhplattlers of Edmonton were formed in 1971 by three couples who wanted to preserve the culture and traditions of their Heimat in Bavaria. Their early performances were mainly in the Edmonton Hofbräuhaus. The costumes worn by these members were actually hand-sewn by the Mädels (young women); later, the group imported their Tracht from the Chiemgau area of Bavaria. The dances remained true to their original form, although flavoured by the imagination and sense of humour of the individual members.

The group has grown considerably over the past quarter-century, and is currently composed of twenty men and women.

== Costume ==
As mentioned above, the Tracht, or costume, originates from the Chiemgau area (50 km SE of Munich) around 1900. The ladies in the group wear a white blouse with puffed sleeves, under a sleeveless dress made with a laced bodice and a full Dirndl skirt. The dresses, in a variety of colours, are actually imported from Germany, as are the Lederhosen that the men wear. These dresses are always worn with an apron, white knee socks and black pumps. The ladies also wear an actual Edelweiss blossom, encased in glass and hung as a pendant from a black velvet band. Should you have the pleasure of witnessing the Bayrisch Guck dance, you will see that the girls wear lace-trimmed bloomers under their Dirndls!

The men are typically dressed in black leather trousers, trimmed with light-green embroidery, white shirts with red ties, and dark-green velour hats. In most cases, the hats are adorned with a Gamsbart, the beard of a Gemse, or chamois; despite its name, it is harvested from the manes of Bavarian mountain goats. The costume is completed by either traditional Wadenstrümpfe (calf socks) or full-length Kniestrümpfe, as well as leather Haferlschuhe.

The Bavarian Schuhplattlers travel with an assortment of props, including scythes, axes, saws, hammers, chisels, lanterns, a Maibaum (maypole) for their "May Day" dance, and in many cases a massive log or two for the Holzhackertanz (Wood Choppers Dance). Female members of the troupe also perform traditional folk songs, including "Edelweiss" and the "Kufsteinlied," on cowbells.

== See also ==
- Schuhplattler
- Folk dance
