= Wildrose Party candidates in the 2012 Alberta provincial election =

This is a list of the candidates who ran for the Wildrose Party in the 28th Alberta provincial election. The party ran a full slate of 87, winning 17.

== Calgary area (28 seats) ==
Electoral district	Candidate name	Gender	Residence	Occupation / Notes	Votes	%	Rank
Airdrie	Rob Anderson	male	Airdrie	lawyer	9,415	57.81	1/5
Calgary-Acadia	Richard Jones	male	Calgary	lawyer	6,312	42.15	2/5
Calgary-Bow	Tim Dyck	male	Calgary	transportation manager	5,700	38.42	2/5
Calgary-Buffalo	Mike Blanchard	male	Calgary	journalist	2,413	21.11	3/5
Calgary-Cross	Happy Mann	male	Calgary	real estate	4,884	38.93	2/5
Calgary-Currie	Corrie Adolph	female	Calgary	employment trainer	4,758	28.93	2/6
Calgary-East	Jesse Minhas	male	Calgary	real estate investor	4,995	38.41	2/5
Calgary-Elbow	James Cole	male	Calgary	investment professional	5,523	28.66	2/6
Calgary-Fish Creek	Heather Forsyth	female	Calgary	Solicitor General	7,700	43.93	1/4
Calgary-Foothills	Dustin Nau	male	Calgary	adjunct professor	5,117	33.55	2/4
Calgary-Fort	Jeevan Mangat	male	Calgary	commercial real estate	4,358	39.17	2/5
Calgary-Glenmore	Paul Hinman	male	Calgary	irrigation farmer	7,880	38.93	2/4
Calgary-Greenway	Ron Leech	male	Calgary	church leader	3,898	32.22	2/4
Calgary-Hawkwood	David Yager	male	Calgary	oil service entrepreneur	7,046	36.58	2/8
Calgary-Hays	Wayne Anderson	male	Calgary	software executive	5,670	36.25	2/4
Calgary-Klein	Jeremy Nixon	male	Calgary	non-profit organization management	5,755	34.61	2/5
Calgary-Lougheed	John Carpay	male	Calgary	former Canadian Taxpayer Federation Alberta Director	5,995	38.39	2/4
Calgary-Mackay-Nose Hill	Roy Alexander	male	Calgary	real estate investor, non-profit consultant	5,458	38.32	2/5
Calgary-McCall	Grant Galpin	male		public consultant	3,183	30.18	2/6
Calgary-Mountain View	Shane McAllister	male	Calgary	computer contractor	3,942	22.92	3/5
Calgary-North West	Chris Challis	male	Calgary	energy services executive	6,879	38.15	2/6
Calgary-Northern Hills	Prasad Panda	male	Calgary	engineer	5,580	37.46	2/4
Calgary-Shaw	Jeff Wilson	male	Calgary	account executive	7,366	45.22	1/5
Calgary-South East	Bill Jarvis	male	Calgary	business owner	6,355	43.09	2/4
Calgary-Varsity	Rob Solinger	male	Calgary	oil and gas finance	4,586	25.85	2/6
Calgary-West	Andrew Constantinidis	male	Calgary	oil and gas management	6,090	37.33	2/6
Chestermere-Rocky View	Bruce McAllister	male	Chestermere	television personality	10,168	58.37	1/4
Highwood	Danielle Smith	female		editorial writer, party leader	10,104	52.59	1/4

== Edmonton area (26 seats) ==
Electoral district	Candidate name	Gender	Residence	Occupation / Notes	Votes	%	Rank
Edmonton-Beverly-Clareview	Don Martin	male		educational consultant	2,851	20.10	3/5
Edmonton-Calder	Rich Neumann	male	Edmonton	business owner	2,787	18.69	3/6
Edmonton-Castle Downs	John Oplanich	male	Edmonton	real estate	3,297	21.53	2/5
Edmonton-Centre	Barb de Groot	female	Edmonton	forest industry	1,759	12.66	4/4
Edmonton-Decore	Chris Bataluk	male	Edmonton	lawyer	2,909	21.61	2/4
Edmonton-Ellerslie	Jackie Lovely	female	Edmonton	non-profit volunteer	3,249	24.58	2/6
Edmonton-Glenora	Don Koziak	male	Edmonton	business owner	2,732	16.90	3/5
Edmonton-Gold Bar	Linda Carlson	female	Edmonton	policy analyst	3,175	15.65	4/6
Edmonton-Highlands-Norwood	Wayde Lever	male	Edmonton	non-profit organization member	2,025	16.40	3/6
Edmonton-Manning	Peter Rodd	male	Edmonton	psychiatrist	3,411	24.76	2/7
Edmonton-McClung	Peter Janisz	male	Edmonton	business owner	2,756	17.91	3/6
Edmonton-Meadowlark	Rick Newcombe	male	Edmonton	computer consultant	2,978	20.52	3/5
Edmonton-Mill Creek	Adam Corsaut	male	Edmonton		2,193	18.21	2/6
Edmonton-Mill Woods	Joanne Autio	female	Edmonton	sales and marketing, casting agent	3,314	23.62	2/6
Edmonton-Riverview	John Corie	male	Edmonton	consultant	2,860	15.48	4/5
Edmonton-Rutherford	Kyle McLeod	male	Edmonton	Canada Post supervisor	2,769	16.82	3/6
Edmonton-South West	Allan Hunsperger	male	Edmonton	private school founder, Christian radio founder	2,714	18.00	2/5
Edmonton-Strathcona	Meagen LaFave	female	Edmonton	university medicine clinical trial manager	1,778	11.72	3/5
Edmonton-Whitemud	Ian Crawford	male	Edmonton	realtor	3,381	16.94	2/5
Fort Saskatchewan-Vegreville	Shannon Stubbs	female		non-profit volunteer	5,800	34.17	2/6
Leduc-Beaumont	David Stasiewich	male		oilfield manufacture owner	5,222	31.83	2/6
Sherwood Park	Garnett Genuis	male	Sherwood Park	news column writer	5,957	31.07	2/7
Spruce Grove-St. Albert	Travis Hughes	male		security manager	5,340	27.23	2/4
St. Albert	James Burrows	male	St. Albert	former city councillor	4,130	21.18	2/5
Stony Plain	Hal Tagg	male	Stony Plain	business owner	6,153	37.37	2/6
Strathcona-Sherwood Park	Paul Nemtechek	male		signals and communication technician	6,424	33.63	2/4

== Remainder of province (33 seats) ==
Electoral district	Candidate name	Gender	Residence	Occupation / Notes	Votes	%	Rank
Athabasca-Sturgeon-Redwater	Travis Olson	male	Athabasca	farmer	5,297	34.75	2/4
Banff-Cochrane	Tom Copithorne	male	MD of Bighorn	rancher	5,933	37.41	2/4
Barrhead-Morinville-Westlock	Link Byfield	male	Morinville	newspaper publisher	7,106	42.67	2/5
Battle River-Wainwright	Dave Nelson	male	Metiskow	rancher	6,710	43.50	2/5
Bonnyville-Cold Lake	Roy Doonanco	male	Glendon	former municipal and school board CAO	4,126	42.07	2/4
Cardston-Taber-Warner	Gary Bikman	male	Stirling	village councillor	5,967	54.37	1/4
Cypress-Medicine Hat	Drew Barnes	male	Medicine Hat	real estate, business owner	7,112	53.47	1/4
Drayton Valley-Devon	Dean Shular	male	Drayton Valley	town councillor	5,462	38.36	2/4
Drumheller-Stettler	Rick Strankman	male	Altario	farmer	7,451	49.40	1/5
Dunvegan-Central Peace-Notley	Kelly Hudson	male	MD of Spirit River	municipal CAO	3,756	42.48	2/4
Fort McMurray-Conklin	Doug Faulkner	male	Fort McMurray	former municipal mayor	2,121	40.11	2/4
Fort McMurray-Wood Buffalo	Guy Boutilier	male	Fort McMurray	former city mayor	3,165	43.00	2/4
Grande Prairie-Smoky	Todd Loewen	male	Municipal District of Greenview No. 16	business owner	4,901	41.12	2/5
Grande Prairie-Wapiti	Ethane Jarvis	male	Grande Prairie	journeyman instrumentation	4,511	34.71	2/5
Innisfail-Sylvan Lake	Kerry Towle	female	Red Deer County	real estate	7,091	46.22	1/5
Lac La Biche-St. Paul-Two Hills	Shayne Saskiw	male	Two Hills	lawyer	5,950	46.57	1/4
Lacombe-Ponoka	Rod Fox	male		sales manager	6,573	43.96	1/5
Lesser Slave Lake	Darryl Boisson	male	High Prairie	oilfield construction business owner	2,847	39.42	2/5
Lethbridge-East	Kent Prestage	male	Lethbridge	accountant	5,147	31.97	2/4
Lethbridge-West	Kevin Kinahan	male	Lethbridge	school teacher	4,261	26.88	3/5
Little Bow	Ian Donovan	male	Vulcan County	former county councillor	6,756	54.18	1/4
Livingstone-Macleod	Pat Stier	male	MD of Foothills	former MD councillor	8,565	47.97	1/5
Medicine Hat	Blake Pedersen	male	Medicine Hat	oilfield supply business owner	6,030	43.53	1/5
Olds-Didsbury-Three Hills	Bruce Rowe	male	Beiseker	village mayor	10,181	56.77	1/4
Peace River	Alan Forsyth	male	High Level	town councillor	2,213	28.43	2/4
Red Deer-North	Randy Weins	male	Red Deer	real estate broker	4,430	33.90	2/5
Red Deer-South	Nathan Stephan	male	Red Deer	chartered accountant	5,558	34.52	2/5
Rimbey-Rocky Mountain House-Sundre	Joe Anglin	male	Rimbey	transmission engineer	7,647	51.26	1/4
Strathmore-Brooks	Jason Hale	male	County of Newell	farmer, bullfighter	8,158	55.61	1/5
Vermilion-Lloydminster	Danny Hozack	male	County of Vermilion River	farmer	4,507	37.47	2/5
West Yellowhead	Stuart Taylor	male	Hinton	forester	2,642	26.41	2/5
Wetaskiwin-Camrose	Trevor Miller	male	Camrose County	canola breeder, county councillor	4,552	31.80	2/5
Whitecourt-Ste. Anne	Maryann Chichak	female	Whitecourt	town councillor	6,003	43.26	2/4

== See also ==
- Alberta Electoral Boundary Re-distribution, 2010
