= 29th Alberta Legislature =

Canadian Legislative Assembly

- Majority parliament
- Jun. 11, 2015 – Mar. 19, 2019

Parliament leaders
- Premier: Rachel Notley; May 24, 2015 — April 30, 2019
- Cabinet: Notley cabinet
- Leader of the Opposition: Brian Jean; May 5, 2015 — July 23, 2017
- Nathan Cooper; July 24, 2017 — October 29, 2017
- Jason Nixon; October 30, 2017 – January 3, 2018
- Jason Kenney; January 4, 2018 – April 15, 2019

Party caucuses
- Government: New Democratic Party
- Opposition: Wildrose Party until July 24, 2017; United Conservative Party since July 24, 2017
- Recognized: Progressive Conservative Association until July 24, 2017
- Unrecognized: Liberal Party
- Alberta Party
- Freedom Conservative

Legislative Assembly
- Speaker of the Assembly: Bob Wanner; June 11, 2015 — May 20, 2019
- Government House leader: Brian Mason; May 21, 2015 — March 19, 2019
- Opposition House leader: Nathan Cooper; June 1, 2015 — July 24, 2017
- Richard Gotfried; July 25, 2017 — October 29, 2017
- Members: 87 MLA seats

Sovereign
- Monarch: Elizabeth II; February 6, 1952 — September 8, 2022
- Lieutenant governor: Hon. Donald Ethell; May 11, 2010 — June 12, 2015
- Hon. Lois Mitchell; June 12, 2015 — August 26, 2020

Sessions
- 1st session June 15, 2015 – 2016
- 2nd session March 8, 2016 – December 14, 2016
- 3rd session March 2, 2017 – March 8, 2018
- 4th session March 8, 2018 – March 18, 2019
- 5th session March 18, 2019 – March 19, 2019
← 28th	→ 30th

The 29th Alberta Legislative Assembly was constituted after the general election on May 5, 2015. The New Democrats, led by Rachel Notley, won a majority of seats and formed the government. The Wildrose Party, which won the second most seats, formed the official opposition until July 2017, when it merged with the Progressive Conservatives, to become the United Conservative Party, which then became the official opposition.

== Membership in the 29th Alberta Legislative Assembly ==
Member	Party	Constituency	First elected / previously elected	No.# of term(s)
Angela Pitt	Wildrose	Airdrie	2015	1st term
Angela Pitt	United Conservative	Airdrie	2015	1st term
Colin Piquette	New Democrat	Athabasca-Sturgeon-Redwater	2015	1st term
Cam Westhead	New Democrat	Banff-Cochrane	2015	1st term
Glenn van Dijken	Wildrose	Barrhead-Morinville-Westlock	2015	1st term
Glenn van Dijken	United Conservative	Barrhead-Morinville-Westlock	2015	1st term
Wes Taylor	Wildrose	Battle River-Wainwright	2015	1st term
Wes Taylor	United Conservative	Battle River-Wainwright	2015	1st term
Scott Cyr	Wildrose	Bonnyville-Cold Lake	2015	1st term
Scott Cyr	United Conservative (2017–2019)	Bonnyville-Cold Lake	2015	1st term
Brandy Payne	New Democrat	Calgary-Acadia	2015	1st term
Deborah Drever	New Democrat	Calgary-Bow	2015	1st term
Deborah Drever	Independent	Calgary-Bow	2015	1st term
Deborah Drever	New Democrat	Calgary-Bow	2015	1st term
Kathleen Ganley	New Democrat	Calgary-Buffalo	2015	1st term
Ricardo Miranda	New Democrat	Calgary-Cross	2015	1st term
Brian Malkinson	New Democrat	Calgary-Currie	2015	1st term
Robyn Luff	New Democrat	Calgary-East	2015	1st term
Robyn Luff	Independent	Calgary-East	2015	1st term
Greg Clark	Alberta Party	Calgary-Elbow	2015	1st term
Richard Gotfried	Progressive Conservative	Calgary-Fish Creek	2015	1st term
Richard Gotfried	United Conservative	Calgary-Fish Creek	2015	1st term
Jim Prentice	Progressive Conservative	Calgary-Foothills	2014	2nd term
Vacant (2015)		Calgary-Foothills	2014	2nd term
Prasad Panda (From September 3, 2015)	Wildrose	Calgary-Foothills	2015	1st term
Prasad Panda (From September 3, 2015)	United Conservative	Calgary-Foothills	2015	1st term
Joe Ceci	New Democrat	Calgary-Fort	2015	1st term
Anam Kazim	New Democrat	Calgary-Glenmore	2015	1st term
Manmeet Bhullar (Until November 23, 2015)	Progressive Conservative	Calgary-Greenway	2008	3rd term
Vacant (2015–2016)		Calgary-Greenway	2008	3rd term
Prabhdeep Gill (From March 22, 2016)	Progressive Conservative	Calgary-Greenway	2016	1st term
Prabhdeep Gill (From March 22, 2016)	United Conservative	Calgary-Greenway	2016	1st term
Prabhdeep Gill (From March 22, 2016)	Independent	Calgary-Greenway	2016	1st term
Michael Connolly	New Democrat	Calgary-Hawkwood	2015	1st term
Ric McIver	Progressive Conservative	Calgary-Hays	2012	2nd term
Ric McIver	United Conservative	Calgary-Hays	2012	2nd term
Craig Coolahan	New Democrat	Calgary-Klein	2015	1st term
Dave Rodney (Until November 1, 2017)	Progressive Conservative	Calgary-Lougheed	2004	4th term
Dave Rodney (Until November 1, 2017)	United Conservative	Calgary-Lougheed	2004	4th term
Vacant (2017)		Calgary-Lougheed	2004	4th term
Jason Kenney (From December 14, 2017)	United Conservative	Calgary-Lougheed	2017	1st term
Karen McPherson	New Democrat	Calgary-Mackay-Nose Hill	2015	1st term
Karen McPherson	Independent	Calgary-Mackay-Nose Hill	2015	1st term
Karen McPherson	Alberta Party	Calgary-Mackay-Nose Hill	2015	1st term
Irfan Sabir	New Democrat	Calgary-McCall	2015	1st term
David Swann	Liberal	Calgary-Mountain View	2004	4th term
Sandra Jansen	Progressive Conservative	Calgary-North West	2012	2nd term
Sandra Jansen	New Democrat	Calgary-North West	2012	2nd term
Jamie Kleinsteuber	New Democrat	Calgary-Northern Hills	2015	1st term
Graham Sucha	New Democrat	Calgary-Shaw	2015	1st term
Rick Fraser	Progressive Conservative	Calgary-South East	2012	2nd term
Rick Fraser	United Conservative	Calgary-South East	2012	2nd term
Rick Fraser	Independent	Calgary-South East	2012	2nd term
Rick Fraser	Alberta Party	Calgary-South East	2012	2nd term
Stephanie McLean (Until January 2, 2019)	New Democrat	Calgary-Varsity	2015	1st term
Vacant (2019)		Calgary-Varsity	2015	1st term
Mike Ellis	Progressive Conservative	Calgary-West	2014	2nd term
Mike Ellis	United Conservative	Calgary-West	2014	2nd term
Grant Hunter	Wildrose	Cardston-Taber-Warner	2015	1st term
Grant Hunter	United Conservative	Cardston-Taber-Warner	2015	1st term
Leela Aheer	Wildrose	Chestermere-Rocky View	2015	1st term
Leela Aheer	United Conservative	Chestermere-Rocky View	2015	1st term
Drew Barnes	Wildrose	Cypress-Medicine Hat	2012	2nd term
Drew Barnes	United Conservative	Cypress-Medicine Hat	2012	2nd term
Mark Smith	Wildrose	Drayton Valley-Devon	2015	1st term
Mark Smith	United Conservative	Drayton Valley-Devon	2015	1st term
Rick Strankman	Wildrose	Drumheller-Stettler	2012	2nd term
Rick Strankman	United Conservative	Drumheller-Stettler	2012	2nd term
Rick Strankman	Independent	Drumheller-Stettler	2012	2nd term
Margaret McCuaig-Boyd	New Democrat	Dunvegan-Central Peace-Notley	2015	1st term
Deron Bilous	New Democrat	Edmonton-Beverly-Clareview	2012	2nd term
David Eggen	New Democrat	Edmonton-Calder	2004, 2012	3rd term*
Nicole Goehring	New Democrat	Edmonton-Castle Downs	2015	1st term
David Shepherd	New Democrat	Edmonton-Centre	2015	1st term
Chris Nielsen	New Democrat	Edmonton-Decore	2015	1st term
Rod Loyola	New Democrat	Edmonton-Ellerslie	2015	1st term
Sarah Hoffman	New Democrat	Edmonton-Glenora	2015	1st term
Marlin Schmidt	New Democrat	Edmonton-Gold Bar	2015	1st term
Brian Mason	New Democrat	Edmonton-Highlands-Norwood	2000	5th term
Heather Sweet	New Democrat	Edmonton-Manning	2015	1st term
Lorne Dach	New Democrat	Edmonton-McClung	2015	1st term
Jon Carson	New Democrat	Edmonton-Meadowlark	2015	1st term
Denise Woollard	New Democrat	Edmonton-Mill Creek	2015	1st term
Christina Gray	New Democrat	Edmonton-Mill Woods	2015	1st term
Lori Sigurdson	New Democrat	Edmonton-Riverview	2015	1st term
Richard Feehan	New Democrat	Edmonton-Rutherford	2015	1st term
Thomas Dang	New Democrat	Edmonton-South West	2015	1st term
Rachel Notley	New Democrat	Edmonton-Strathcona	2008	3rd term
Bob Turner	New Democrat	Edmonton-Whitemud	2015	1st term
Brian Jean (Until March 5, 2018)	Wildrose	Fort McMurray-Conklin	2015	1st term
Brian Jean (Until March 5, 2018)	United Conservative	Fort McMurray-Conklin	2015	1st term
Vacant (2018)		Fort McMurray-Conklin	2015	1st term
Laila Goodridge (From July 12, 2018)	United Conservative	Fort McMurray-Conklin	2018	1st term
Tany Yao	Wildrose	Fort McMurray-Wood Buffalo	2015	1st term
Tany Yao	United Conservative	Fort McMurray-Wood Buffalo	2015	1st term
Jessica Littlewood	New Democrat	Fort Saskatchewan-Vegreville	2015	1st term
Todd Loewen	Wildrose	Grande Prairie-Smoky	2015	1st term
Todd Loewen	United Conservative	Grande Prairie-Smoky	2015	1st term
Wayne Drysdale	Progressive Conservative	Grande Prairie-Wapiti	2008	3rd term
Wayne Drysdale	United Conservative	Grande Prairie-Wapiti	2008	3rd term
Wayne Anderson	Wildrose	Highwood	2015	1st term
Wayne Anderson	United Conservative	Highwood	2015	1st term
Don MacIntyre (Until February 5, 2018)	Wildrose	Innisfail-Sylvan Lake	2015	1st term
Don MacIntyre (Until February 5, 2018)	United Conservative	Innisfail-Sylvan Lake	2015	1st term
Don MacIntyre (Until February 5, 2018)	Independent	Innisfail-Sylvan Lake	2015	1st term
Vacant (2018)		Innisfail-Sylvan Lake	2015	1st term
Devin Dreeshen (From July 12, 2018)	United Conservative	Innisfail-Sylvan Lake	2018	1st term
Dave Hanson	Wildrose	Lac La Biche-St. Paul-Two Hills	2015	1st term
Dave Hanson	United Conservative	Lac La Biche-St. Paul-Two Hills	2015	1st term
Ron Orr	Wildrose	Lacombe-Ponoka	2015	1st term
Ron Orr	United Conservative	Lacombe-Ponoka	2015	1st term
Shaye Anderson	New Democrat	Leduc-Beaumont	2015	1st term
Danielle Larivee	New Democrat	Lesser Slave Lake	2015	1st term
Maria Fitzpatrick	New Democrat	Lethbridge-East	2015	1st term
Shannon Phillips	New Democrat	Lethbridge-West	2015	1st term
Dave Schneider	Wildrose	Little Bow	2015	1st term
Dave Schneider	United Conservative	Little Bow	2015	1st term
Pat Stier	Wildrose	Livingstone-Macleod	2012	2nd term
Pat Stier	United Conservative	Livingstone-Macleod	2012	2nd term
Bob Wanner	New Democrat	Medicine Hat	2015	1st term
Nathan Cooper	Wildrose	Olds-Didsbury-Three Hills	2015	1st term
Nathan Cooper	United Conservative	Olds-Didsbury-Three Hills	2015	1st term
Debbie Jabbour	New Democrat	Peace River	2015	1st term
Kim Schreiner	New Democrat	Red Deer-North	2015	1st term
Barb Miller	New Democrat	Red Deer-South	2015	1st term
Jason Nixon	Wildrose	Rimbey-Rocky Mountain House-Sundre	2015	1st term
Jason Nixon	United Conservative	Rimbey-Rocky Mountain House-Sundre	2015	1st term
Annie McKitrick	New Democrat	Sherwood Park	2015	1st term
Vivienne Horne	New Democrat	Spruce Grove-St. Albert	2015	1st term
Marie Renaud	New Democrat	St. Albert	2015	1st term
Erin Babcock	New Democrat	Stony Plain	2015	1st term
Estefania Cortes-Vargas	New Democrat	Strathcona-Sherwood Park	2015	1st term
Derek Fildebrandt	Wildrose	Strathmore-Brooks	2015	1st term
Derek Fildebrandt	United Conservative	Strathmore-Brooks	2015	1st term
Derek Fildebrandt	Independent	Strathmore-Brooks	2015	1st term
Derek Fildebrandt	Freedom Conservative	Strathmore-Brooks	2015	1st term
Richard Starke	Progressive Conservative	Vermilion-Lloydminster	2012	2nd term
Eric Rosendahl	New Democrat	West Yellowhead	2015	1st term
Bruce Hinkley	New Democrat	Wetaskiwin-Camrose	2015	1st term
Oneil Carlier	New Democrat	Whitecourt-Ste. Anne	2015	1st term

== Seating plan ==
=== As of July 2017 ===
		Dach		Taylor	Hunter	Orr	Cyr	Strankman	Schneider	Anderson	Stier		Fraser	Starke
	Sucha	Hinkley		van Dijken	MacIntyre	Panda	Hanson	Yao	Pitt	Loewen		Ellis	Drysdale	Gotfried
	Jabbour	Sweet		Smith	Barnes	Nixon	Cooper	Jean	Aheer	Fildebrandt		Rodney	McIver	Gill		Swann	Clark
Wanner
	McLean	Feehan	Carlier	Phillips	Sigurdson	Bilous	Ganley	Mason	Notley	Ceci	Hoffman	Eggen	McCuaig-Boyd	Sabir	Larivee	Miranda	Gray
	Rosendahl	Luff	Jansen	Piquette	Miller	Goehring	Schmidt	Cortes-Vargas		Westhead	Payne	Anderson	Littlewood	Shepherd	Babcock	Coolahan	McPherson
	Woollard	Kleinsteuber	Turner	Dang	Drever	Nielsen	Schreiner	Connolly		Loyola	Renaud	Malkinson	McKitrick	Fitzpatrick	Carson	Kazim	Horne

Official Seating Plan (Retrieved July 19, 2017)

=== As of March 14, 2018 ===
The merger of the Wildrose and Progressive Conservatives in late July 2017 created the United Conservative caucus, which was recognized by the Speaker's office as the official opposition, among other changes to party affiliations. The seating plan was therefore altered for the fall sitting.

						Stier	Anderson	Taylor		Schneider	Orr				Starke		Fildebrandt
	Sucha	Hinkley		Hanson	van Dijken	Cyr	Loewen	Gill		Pitt	Yao	Hunter	Gotfried		Swann		Clark
	Jabbour	Sweet		Cooper	Ellis	Strankman	McIver	Nixon	Kenney	Aheer	Panda	Barnes	Drysdale	Smith		Fraser	McPherson
Wanner
	McLean	Feehan	Carlier	Phillips	Sigurdson	Bilous	Ganley	Mason	Notley	Ceci	Hoffman	McCuaig-Boyd	Eggen	Sabir	Larivee	Miranda	Gray
	Luff	Piquette	Miller	Goehring	Littlewood	Jansen	Schmidt	Cortes-Vargas		Westhead	Payne	Anderson	McKitrick	Shepherd	Babcock	Coolahan	Rosendahl
	Woollard	Kleinsteuber	Turner	Dang	Drever	Nielsen	Schreiner	Connolly		Loyola	Renaud	Malkinson	Dach	Fitzpatrick	Carson	Kazim	Horne

Official Seating Plan (Retrieved March 14, 2018)

== By-elections to the 29th Legislative Assembly ==
By-election	Date	Incumbent	Party	Winner	Party	Cause	Retained
Calgary-Foothills	September 3, 2015	None		Prasad Panda	Wildrose	Jim Prentice disclaimed his victory on election night.	No
Calgary-Greenway	March 22, 2016	Manmeet Bhullar	Progressive Conservative	Prabhdeep Gill	Progressive Conservative	Bhullar was killed in a motor vehicle collision on November 23, 2015.	Yes
Calgary-Lougheed	December 14, 2017	Dave Rodney	United Conservative	Jason Kenney	United Conservative	Rodney resigned to allow Jason Kenney a seat in the Legislature.	Yes
Innisfail-Sylvan Lake	July 12, 2018	Don MacIntyre	United Conservative (Note: Resigned from the United Conservative caucus to sit as an independent shortly before resigning as MLA.)	Devin Dreeshen	United Conservative	MacIntyre resigned to return to private life, and is facing charges of sexual assault.	Yes
Fort McMurray-Conklin	July 12, 2018	Brian Jean	United Conservative	Laila Goodridge	United Conservative	Jean retired from politics to focus on his personal life.	Yes

== Standings changes since the 29th general election ==
Number of members per party by date	2015				2016			2017							2018								2019	
Number of members per party by date	May 5	May 22	Sep 3	Nov 23	Jan 8	Mar 22	Nov 17	Jul 24	Aug 15	Sep 21	Oct 4	Oct 29	Nov 1	Dec 14	Jan 9	Feb 2	Feb 5	March 5	July 12	July 14	July 18	Nov 9	Jan 2	Jan 15
New Democratic	54	53			54		55				54											53	52	
United Conservative	0							29	28	27			26	27		26		25	27	26				25
Wildrose	21		22					0																
Progressive Conservative	9			8		9	8	1																
Liberal	1																							
Alberta Party	1											2			3									
Freedom Conservative	0																				1			
Independent	0	1			0				1	2	3	2			1	2	1			2	1	2		3
Total members	86		87	86		87							86	87			86	85	87				86	
Vacant	1		0	1		0							1	0			1	2	0				1	

Membership changes in the 29th Assembly
Date	Name	District	From	To	Reason
May 5, 2015	See list of members				Election day of the 29th Alberta general election
May 5, 2015	Jim Prentice	Calgary-Foothills	█ PC	█ Vacant	Disclaimed seat
May 22, 2015	Deborah Drever	Calgary-Bow	█ New Democratic	█ Independent	Suspended from NDP caucus
September 3, 2015	Prasad Panda	Calgary-Foothills	█ Vacant	█ Wildrose	Wins by-election
November 23, 2015	Manmeet Bhullar	Calgary-Greenway	█ PC	█ Vacant	Death (car accident)
January 8, 2016	Deborah Drever	Calgary-Bow	█ Independent	█ New Democratic	Rejoined NDP caucus
March 22, 2016	Prabhdeep Gill	Calgary-Greenway	█ Vacant	█ PC	Wins by-election
November 17, 2016	Sandra Jansen	Calgary-North West	█ PC	█ New Democratic	Crossed floor to NDP after alleging a PC Party leadership candidate had harassed her.
July 24, 2017	Angela Pitt	Airdrie	█ Wildrose	█ United Cons.	Crossed floor to UCP following Wildrose/PC merger.
July 24, 2017	Glenn van Dijken	Barrhead-Morinville-Westlock	█ Wildrose	█ United Cons.	Crossed floor to UCP following Wildrose/PC merger.
July 24, 2017	Wes Taylor	Battle River-Wainwright	█ Wildrose	█ United Cons.	Crossed floor to UCP following Wildrose/PC merger.
July 24, 2017	Scott Cyr	Bonnyville-Cold Lake	█ Wildrose	█ United Cons.	Crossed floor to UCP following Wildrose/PC merger.
July 24, 2017	Richard Gotfried	Calgary-Fish Creek	█ PC	█ United Cons.	Crossed floor to UCP following Wildrose/PC merger.
July 24, 2017	Prasad Panda	Calgary-Foothills	█ Wildrose	█ United Cons.	Crossed floor to UCP following Wildrose/PC merger.
July 24, 2017	Prab Gill	Calgary-Greenway	█ PC	█ United Cons.	Crossed floor to UCP following Wildrose/PC merger.
July 24, 2017	Ric McIver	Calgary-Hays	█ PC	█ United Cons.	Crossed floor to UCP following Wildrose/PC merger.
July 24, 2017	Dave Rodney	Calgary-Lougheed	█ PC	█ United Cons.	Crossed floor to UCP following Wildrose/PC merger.
July 24, 2017	Rick Fraser	Calgary-South East	█ PC	█ United Cons.	Crossed floor to UCP following Wildrose/PC merger.
July 24, 2017	Mike Ellis	Calgary-West	█ PC	█ United Cons.	Crossed floor to UCP following Wildrose/PC merger.
July 24, 2017	Grant Hunter	Cardston-Taber-Warner	█ Wildrose	█ United Cons.	Crossed floor to UCP following Wildrose/PC merger.
July 24, 2017	Leela Aheer	Chestermere-Rocky View	█ Wildrose	█ United Cons.	Crossed floor to UCP following Wildrose/PC merger.
July 24, 2017	Drew Barnes	Cypress-Medicine Hat	█ Wildrose	█ United Cons.	Crossed floor to UCP following Wildrose/PC merger.
July 24, 2017	Mark Smith	Drayton Valley-Devon	█ Wildrose	█ United Cons.	Crossed floor to UCP following Wildrose/PC merger.
July 24, 2017	Rick Strankman	Drumheller-Stettler	█ Wildrose	█ United Cons.	Crossed floor to UCP following Wildrose/PC merger.
July 24, 2017	Brian Jean	Fort McMurray-Conklin	█ Wildrose	█ United Cons.	Crossed floor to UCP following Wildrose/PC merger.
July 24, 2017	Tany Yao	Fort McMurray-Wood Buffalo	█ Wildrose	█ United Cons.	Crossed floor to UCP following Wildrose/PC merger.
July 24, 2017	Todd Loewen	Grande Prairie-Smoky	█ Wildrose	█ United Cons.	Crossed floor to UCP following Wildrose/PC merger.
July 24, 2017	Wayne Drysdale	Grande Prairie-Wapiti	█ Wildrose	█ United Cons.	Crossed floor to UCP following Wildrose/PC merger.
July 24, 2017	Wayne Anderson	Highwood	█ PC	█ United Cons.	Crossed floor to UCP following Wildrose/PC merger.
July 24, 2017	Don MacIntyre	Innisfail-Sylvan Lake	█ Wildrose	█ United Cons.	Crossed floor to UCP following Wildrose/PC merger.
July 24, 2017	Dave Hanson	Lac La Biche-St. Paul-Two Hills	█ Wildrose	█ United Cons.	Crossed floor to UCP following Wildrose/PC merger.
July 24, 2017	Ron Orr	Lacombe-Ponoka	█ Wildrose	█ United Cons.	Crossed floor to UCP following Wildrose/PC merger.
July 24, 2017	Dave Schneider	Little Bow	█ Wildrose	█ United Cons.	Crossed floor to UCP following Wildrose/PC merger.
July 24, 2017	Pat Stier	Livingstone-Macleod	█ Wildrose	█ United Cons.	Crossed floor to UCP following Wildrose/PC merger.
July 24, 2017	Nathan Cooper	Olds-Didsbury-Three Hills	█ Wildrose	█ United Cons.	Crossed floor to UCP following Wildrose/PC merger.
July 24, 2017	Jason Nixon	Rimbey-Rocky Mountain House-Sundre	█ Wildrose	█ United Cons.	Crossed floor to UCP following Wildrose/PC merger.
July 24, 2017	Derek Fildebrandt	Strathmore-Brooks	█ Wildrose	█ United Cons.	Crossed floor to UCP following Wildrose/PC merger.
August 15, 2017	Derek Fildebrandt	Strathmore-Brooks	█ United Cons.	█ Independent	Resigned from UCP caucus following an expenses scandal.
September 21, 2017	Rick Fraser	Calgary-South East	█ United Cons.	█ Independent	Resigned from UCP caucus to sit as an independent.
October 4, 2017	Karen McPherson	Calgary-Mackay-Nose Hill	█ New Democratic	█ Independent	Resigned from NDP caucus to sit as an independent.
October 29, 2017	Karen McPherson	Calgary-Mackay-Nose Hill	█ Independent	█ Alberta Party	Joined the Alberta Party
November 1, 2017	Dave Rodney	Calgary-Lougheed	█ United Cons.	█ Vacant	Resigned to allow UCP Leader Jason Kenney a seat in the legislature.
December 14, 2017	Jason Kenney	Calgary-Lougheed	█ Vacant	█ United Cons.	Won seat in by-election.
January 9, 2018	Rick Fraser	Calgary-South East	█ Independent	█ Alberta Party	Joined the Alberta Party to run in the leadership race
February 2, 2018	Don MacIntyre	Innisfail-Sylvan Lake	█ United Cons.	█ Independent	Resigned from UCP caucus to "focus on family."
February 5, 2018	Don MacIntyre	Innisfail-Sylvan Lake	█ Independent	█ Vacant	Resigned seat. Later revealed he faced charges of sexual assault and sexual interference
March 5, 2018	Brian Jean	Fort McMurray-Conklin	█ United Cons.	█ Vacant	Resigned seat and retired from politics to focus on family.
July 12, 2018	Laila Goodridge	Fort McMurray-Conklin	█ Vacant	█ United Cons.	Elected in a by-election.
July 12, 2018	Devin Dreeshen	Innisfail-Sylvan Lake	█ Vacant	█ United Cons.	Elected in a by-election.
July 14, 2018	Prab Gill	Calgary-Greenway	█ United Cons.	█ Independent	Left caucus due to alleged voter ballot stuffing
July 18, 2018	Derek Fildebrandt	Strathmore-Brooks	█ Independent	█ Freedom Cons.	Joined Freedom Conservative Party to become its leader
November 9, 2018	Robyn Luff	Calgary-East	█ New Democratic	█ Independent	The Alberta New Democratic Party removed Luff from caucus claiming she was neither trustworthy nor productive.
January 2, 2019	Stephanie McLean	Calgary-Varsity	█ New Democratic	█ Vacant	Resigned to focus on law career.
January 15, 2019	Rick Strankman	Drumheller-Stettler	█ United Cons.	█ Independent	Resigned from UCP caucus after losing renomination.
