= Ron Orr =

Canadian politician

The Honourable Ron Orr ECA
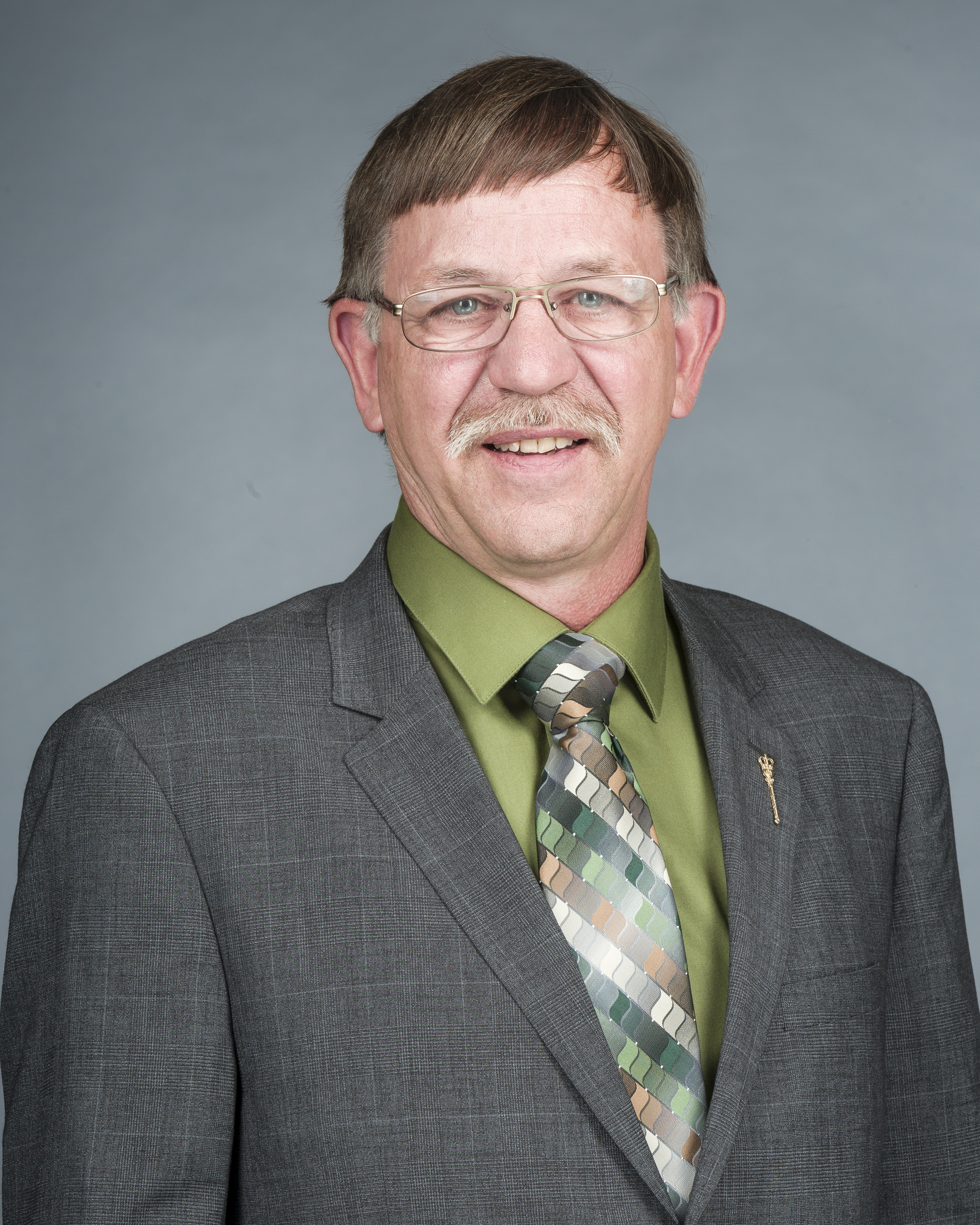

Minister of Culture
- In office 8 July 2021 – 23 October 2022
- Premier: Jason Kenney
- Preceded by: Leela Aheer
- Succeeded by: Jason Luan

Member of the Legislative Assembly of Alberta for Lacombe-Ponoka
- In office 5 May 2015 – 29 May 2023
- Preceded by: Rod Fox
- Succeeded by: Jennifer Johnson

Personal details
- Born: 1954 (age 71–72) Calgary, Alberta
- Party: United Conservative
- Other political affiliations: Wildrose (2015–2017)
- Education: Taylor College and Seminary
- Occupation: contractor, carpenter, minister

Ronald James Nelson Orr (born 1954) is a Canadian politician from Alberta. Orr was a member of the Legislative Assembly of Alberta for the electoral district of Lacombe-Ponoka from 2015 until 2023. Orr served as a member of Executive Council of Alberta in the cabinet of Jason Kenney holding the position of Minister of Culture, Multiculturalism and Status of Women from 2021 to 2022.

== Political life ==
Orr was elected in the 2015 Alberta general election to represent the electoral district of Lacombe-Ponoka in the 29th Alberta Legislature as a member of the Wildrose Party. Orr was re-elected in the 2019 Alberta general election to the 30th Alberta Legislature.

Orr was appointed to the Cabinet of Jason Kenney as the Minister of Culture on 8 July 2021.

During the 2022 United Conservative Party leadership election, Orr endorsed the campaign of Travis Toews. Following Danielle Smith's selection as United Conservative Party leader, Orr was not selected to join Danielle Smith's Cabinet. On 25 October 2022, Orr announced he wouldn't seek re-election in 2023. He was succeeded by Jennifer Johnson.

== Electoral history ==
=== 2015 general election ===
2015 Alberta general election: Lacombe-Ponoka
Party	Candidate	Votes	%	±%
Wildrose	Ron Orr	6,502	35.71%	-8.26%
New Democratic	Doug Hart	5,481	30.10%	20.21%
Progressive Conservative	Peter Dewit	5,018	27.56%	-8.31%
Alberta Party	Tony Jeglum	1,206	6.62%	1.40%
Total		18,207	–	–
Rejected, spoiled and declined		83	–	–
Eligible electors / turnout		30,827	59.33%	2.52%
Wildrose hold		Swing		-1.24%
Source(s) Source: "66 - Lacombe-Ponoka, 2015 Alberta general election". officialresults.elections.ab.ca. Elections Alberta.

=== 2019 general election ===
2019 Alberta general election: Lacombe-Ponoka
Party	Candidate	Votes	%	±%
United Conservative	Ron Orr	17,379	71.31	+8.03
New Democratic	Doug Hart	3,639	14.93	-15.17
Alberta Party	Myles Chykerda	2,520	10.34	+3.72
Freedom Conservative	Keith Parrill	328	1.35	–
Alberta Independence	Tessa Szwagierczak	279	1.14	–
Advantage	Shawn Tylke	227	0.93	–
Total		24,372	99.26	–
Rejected, spoiled and declined		181	0.74	+0.28
Turnout		24,553	75.07	+15.74
Eligible voters		32,706		
United Conservative notional hold		Swing		+11.60
Source(s) Source: "68 - Lacombe-Ponoka, 2019 Alberta general election". officialresults.elections.ab.ca. Elections Alberta.
