= Ray Prins =

Canadian politician

Member of the Legislative Assembly of Alberta
- In office November 22, 2004 – April 23, 2012
- Preceded by: new district
- Succeeded by: Rod Fox
- Constituency: Lacombe-Ponoka

Personal details
- Born: April 15, 1951 (age 75) Lacombe, Alberta, Canada
- Party: Progressive Conservative

Raymond Frank "Ray" Prins (born April 15, 1951) is a Canadian politician and was a Member of the Legislative Assembly of Alberta, representing the constituency of Lacombe-Ponoka as a Progressive Conservative.

== Early life ==
Prins was born April 15, 1951, in Lacombe, Alberta. After high school, he worked a variety of agriculture and construction jobs, including two years in oilfield construction northeast of Tuktoyaktuk, Northwest Territories, and a year in refinery maintenance in Edmonton. In 1974, Prins bought a farm near Gull Lake, Alberta where he grew grain and hay, and raised cattle, hogs, elk and bison.

== Political career ==
Prins was elected to a second term representing the constituency of Lacombe-Ponoka in the 2008 provincial election, where he received 58 per cent of the vote. The constituency race garnered national media attention with Alberta Greens candidate Joe Anglin thought by many to be the Alberta Green's best chance at earning its first seat in a provincial legislature. Anglin took 23 per cent of the March 2008 vote.

Prins was, up to March 2012, the chair of the Policy Field Committee on Resources and Environment, and the Standing Committee on Privileges and Elections, Standing Orders and Printing. He resigned from this position, soon after it was revealed that the committee had never met, yet the committee members were receiving pay for being on the committee. On March 20, 2012, Prins also announced he would not seek re-election. He was also a member of the Treasury Board and the Cabinet Policy Committee on Resources and the Environment.

Prins was first elected in 2004, when he received 53 per cent of the vote in his constituency. Since being elected, Prins has sat on numerous committees. He has chaired the Seniors Advisory Council, MLA Task Force for Seniors, the Review of Local Authorities Election Act and Rural Development Strategy. He has also served as deputy chair of the Public Accounts Committee.

Prior to entering provincial politics, Prins was reeve of Lacombe County from 2001 to 2004. He was a founding member of the North Red Deer River Regional Water Services Commission (2004), a process he saw to completion as an MLA. He has also served as chair of the Lacombe County Agricultural Service Board.

== Personal life ==
He is a member of Woodynook Christian Reformed Church in Blackfalds, Alberta, past chair of the Lacombe Christian School Board and former vice-chair of King’s University College Board of Governors.

Prins has volunteered on community developing trips to Mali, Kenya, Russia and Armenia. He also participated in a project building water systems throughout rural Sierra Leone, where he was named an honorary Kuranko tribesman.

== Election results ==
2004 Alberta general election: Lacombe-Ponoka
Party	Candidate	Votes	%	±%
Progressive Conservative	Ray Prins	6,923	52.93%	–
Alberta Alliance	Ed Klop	2,349	17.96%	–
Liberal	Glen T. Simmonds	2,214	16.93%	–
New Democratic	Jim Graves	1,133	8.66%	–
Social Credit	Teena Cormack	461	3.52%	–
Total		13,080	–	–
Rejected, spoiled and declined		77	–	–
Eligible electors / turnout		26,373	49.89%	–
Progressive Conservative pickup new district.				
Source(s) Source: "Lacombe-Ponoka Statement of Official Results 2004 Alberta general election" (PDF). Elections Alberta.

2008 Alberta general election: Lacombe-Ponoka
Party	Candidate	Votes	%	±%
Progressive Conservative	Ray Prins	8,202	58.17%	5.25%
Green	Joe Anglin	3,226	22.88%	–
Liberal	Edith McPhedran	1,200	8.51%	-8.42%
Wildrose	Daniel Friesen	911	6.46%	-11.50%
New Democratic	Steven P. Bradshaw	560	3.97%	-4.69%
Total		14,099	–	–
Rejected, spoiled and declined		68	–	–
Eligible electors / turnout		32,200	44.00%	-5.89%
Progressive Conservative hold		Swing		0.16%
Source(s) Source: "61 - Lacombe-Ponoka, 2008 Alberta general election". officialresults.elections.ab.ca. Elections Alberta. The Report on the March 3, 2008 Provincial General Election of the Twenty-seventh Legislative Assembly. Elections Alberta. pp. 450–455.
