= Jennifer Johnson (Canadian politician) =

Canadian politician

Jennifer Johnson MLA

Member of the Legislative Assembly for Lacombe-Ponoka
- Incumbent
- Assumed office May 29, 2023
- Preceded by: Ron Orr

Personal details
- Party: United Conservative
- Other political affiliations: Independent (2023–2024)

Jennifer Johnson is a Canadian politician from the United Conservative Party. She was elected member of the Legislative Assembly of Alberta for Lacombe-Ponoka in the 2023 Alberta general election.

In 2023 Johnson defeated Lacombe City Councilor Chris Ross and paramedic Dusty Myshrall to win the UCP nomination in Lacombe-Ponoka.

Speaking at an event on September 1, 2022, Johnson was accused of comparing transgender children to feces in food. She was welcomed back into the UCP caucus in October 2024, with Danielle Smith describing her as an "excellent representative."

In 2017 Johnson also published a children's book: Cherries-Just Right!.

== Electoral history ==
=== 2023 general election ===
2023 Alberta general election: Lacombe-Ponoka
Party	Candidate	Votes	%	±%
United Conservative	Jennifer Johnson (Note: On May 24, United Conservative Party leader Danielle Smith announced that Johnson would be excluded from the United Conservative caucus if elected. As this decision came after the deadline for candidate registration, she remained on the ballot as a United Conservative.)	14,324	67.57	-3.74
New Democratic	Dave Dale	4,995	23.56	+8.63
Alberta Party	Myles Chykerda	1,167	5.50	-4.84
Wildrose Loyalty Coalition	Daniel Jeffries	444	2.09	–
Green	Taylor Lowery	196	0.92	–
Solidarity Movement	Nathan Leslie	74	0.35	–
Total		21,200	99.40	–
Rejected and declined		128	0.60	
Turnout		21,328	61.28	
Eligible voters		34,804		
United Conservative hold		Swing		-6.19
Source(s) Source: Elections Alberta

UCP Lacombe-Ponoka nomination contest: February 17, 2023

Candidate	Votes	%
Jennifer Johnson	970	74.9
Dusty Myshrall	278	21.5
Chris Ross	47	3.6
Total	1,295	100.0
