= Rimbey-Rocky Mountain House-Sundre =

Provincial electoral district in Alberta, Canada

Alberta electoral district
- Rimbey-Rocky Mountain House-Sundre within Alberta, 2017 boundaries

Provincial electoral district
- Legislature: Legislative Assembly of Alberta
MLA
Jason Nixon
United Conservative
- District created: 2010
- First contested: 2012
- Last contested: 2023

Rimbey-Rocky Mountain House-Sundre is a provincial electoral district in central Alberta, Canada. The district was created in the 2010 boundary redistribution and is mandated to return a single member to the Legislative Assembly of Alberta using the first past the post voting system. It includes the towns of Bentley, Eckville, Rimbey, Rocky Mountain House, and Sundre.

== History ==
The electoral district was created in the 2010 Alberta boundary re-distribution. It was created from the old electoral district of Rocky Mountain House which was expanded to include the town of Rimbey, which was previously in Lacombe-Ponoka. The riding also gained some land west of Sylvan Lake.

The riding saw the lowest percentage of voters supporting Alberta remaining a province of Canada (48.9%) in the provincial referendum of October 19, 2026 and one of only two ridings, the other being Central Peace-Notley, where the majority voted for initiating the process of holding a binding referendum, with the other 85 ridings voting against the referendum.

=== Boundary history ===
77 Rimbey-Rocky Mountain House-Sundre 2010 boundaries
Bordering districts
North	East	West	South
Drayton Valley-Devon and West Yellowhead	Innisfail-Sylvan Lake, Lacombe-Ponoka, and Olds-Didsbury-Three Hills	British Columbia boundary	Banff-Cochrane
Legal description from the Statutes of Alberta 2010, Electoral Divisions Act

=== Electoral history ===
Members of the Legislative Assembly for Rimbey-Rocky Mountain House-Sundre
Assembly	Years	Member	Party
See Rocky Mountain House 1940-2012
28th	2012–2014	Joe Anglin	Wildrose
28th	2014–2015	Joe Anglin	Independent
29th	2015–2017	Jason Nixon	Wildrose
29th	2017–2019	Jason Nixon	United; Conservative
30th	2019–2023	Jason Nixon	United; Conservative
31st	2023–present	Jason Nixon	United; Conservative

The predecessor Rocky Mountain House had returned Progressive Conservative MLAs since 1971. From 1940 to 1970 popular Social Credit MLA Alfred Hooke represented the district. The current incumbent is Jason Nixon who won the seat for the Wildrose Party in the 2015 election.

== Legislative election results ==
=== 2023 ===
2023 Alberta general election
Party	Candidate	Votes	%	±%
United Conservative	Jason Nixon	15,571	69.46	-12.18
Independent	Tim Hoven	3,393	15.14	–
New Democratic	Vance Buchwald	3,118	13.91	+4.81
Independent	Fred Schwieger	135	0.60	–
Advantage Party	Carol Nordlund Kinsey	103	0.46	-0.18
Wildrose Loyalty Coalition	Tami Tatlock	96	0.43	–
Total		22,416	99.37	–
Rejected and declined		142	0.63	
Turnout		22,558	64.89	
Eligible voters		34,766		
United Conservative hold		Swing		-13.66
Source(s) Source: Elections Alberta

=== 2019 ===
2019 Alberta general election
Party	Candidate	Votes	%	±%
United Conservative	Jason Nixon	20,579	81.64	+9.28
New Democratic	Jeff Ible	2,293	9.10	-8.10
Alberta Party	Joe Anglin	1,350	5.36	+4.85
Freedom Conservative	Dawn Berard	303	1.20	–
Green	Jane Drummond	286	1.13	+1.04
Alberta Independence	David Rogers	185	0.73	–
Alberta Advantage Party	Paula Lamoureux	161	0.64	–
Independent	Gordon Francey	50	0.20	–
Total		25,207	99.26	–
Rejected, spoiled and declined		189	0.74	
Turnout		25,396	75.36	
Eligible voters		33,699		
United Conservative notional hold		Swing		+8.69
Source(s) Source: "80 - Rimbey-Rocky Mountain House-Sundre, 2019 Alberta general election". officialresults.elections.ab.ca. Elections Alberta. Alberta. Chief Electoral Officer (2019). 2019 General Election. A Report of the Chief Electoral Officer. Volume II (PDF) (Report). Vol. 2. Edmonton, Alta.: Elections Alberta. pp. 386–393. ISBN 978-1-988620-12-1.

=== 2015 ===
2015 Alberta general election
Party	Candidate	Votes	%	±%
Wildrose	Jason Nixon	6,670	40.11%	-11.31%
Progressive Conservative	Tammy Coté	5,296	31.85%	-8.70%
New Democratic	Hannah Schlamp	2,791	16.78%	11.58%
Independent	Joe Anglin	1,871	11.25%	–
Total		16,628	–	–
Rejected, spoiled and declined		60	37	10
Eligible electors / turnout		32,578	51.26%	-2.47%
Wildrose hold		Swing		-1.30%
Source(s) Source: "77 - Rimbey-Rocky Mountain House-Sundre, 2015 Alberta general election". officialresults.elections.ab.ca. Elections Alberta. Chief Electoral Officer (2016). 2015 General Election. A Report of the Chief Electoral Officer (PDF) (Report). Edmonton, Alta.: Elections Alberta. pp. 411–412.

2015 Alberta general election redistributed results
Party	Votes	%
Wildrose	7,604	40.34
Progressive Conservative	6,036	32.02
New Democratic	3,242	17.20
Independent	1,856	9.85
Alberta Party	95	0.50
Green	18	0.10
Source(s) Source: Ridingbuilder

=== 2012 ===
2012 Alberta general election
Party	Candidate	Votes	%	±%
Wildrose Alliance	Joe Anglin	7,664	51.42%	–
Progressive Conservative	Ty Lund	6,044	40.55%	–
New Democratic	Doreen Broska	776	5.21%	–
Liberal	Mason Sisson	420	2.82%	–
Total		14,904	–	–
Rejected, spoiled and declined		57	33	8
Eligible electors / turnout		27,863	53.72%	–
Wildrose Alliance pickup new district.				
Source(s) Source: "77 - Rimbey-Rocky Mountain House-Sundre, 2012 Alberta general election". officialresults.elections.ab.ca. Elections Alberta. Chief Electoral Officer (2012). The Report of the Chief Electoral Officer on the 2011 Provincial Enumeration and Monday, April 23, 2012 Provincial General Election of the Twenty-eighth Legislative Assembly (PDF) (Report). Edmonton, Alta.: Elections Alberta. pp. 456–458. Archived (PDF) from the original on May 6, 2021.

== See also ==
- List of Alberta provincial electoral districts
- Canadian provincial electoral districts
