= Smith ministry =

Cabinet of Alberta since 2022

- 19th ministry of Alberta
- Date formed: October 11, 2022

People and organisations
- Monarch: Charles III
- Lieutenant Governor: Salma Lakhani
- Premier: Danielle Smith
- Premier's history: Premiership of Danielle Smith
- Member party: United Conservative
- Status in legislature: Majority
- Opposition party: New Democratic
- Opposition leader: Rachel Notley (2022–2024); Christina Gray (2024–2025); Naheed Nenshi (2025–2027)

History
- Incoming formation: 2022 United Conservative Party leadership election
- Election: 2023
- Outgoing election: 2027
- Legislature terms: 30th Alberta Legislature; 31st Alberta Legislature
- Predecessor: Kenney Ministry

The Smith ministry is the combined Cabinet (formally the Executive Council of Alberta), chaired by 19th Premier of Alberta Danielle Smith, that has governed Alberta since October 11, 2022. The Cabinet consists of members of the United Conservative Party, which holds a majority of the seats in the Legislative Assembly of Alberta.

The Smith Ministry replaced the Kenney Ministry, following the 2022 United Conservative Party leadership election.

== Cabinet composition ==
=== Initial Cabinet (October 2022–June 2023) ===
On October 21, 2022, Smith's inaugural cabinet was sworn in. It consisted of 25 ministers, the largest for a new premier's Cabinet in Alberta's history, an increase over Jason Kenney's initial Cabinet of 23 ministers. Five of the six rivals that Smith faced for the leadership were included in cabinet: Travis Toews was named finance minister; Brian Jean was appointed to a revamped ministry of jobs, economy and northern development; Todd Loewen headed a newly combined ministry of forestry, parks and tourism; Rebecca Schulz gained municipal affairs; and Rajan Sawhney took the ministry of trade, immigration and multiculturalism. Leela Aheer, who placed seventh, did not join cabinet. Adriana LaGrange, Demetrios Nicolaides and Tyler Shandro retained their portfolios from the Kenney Ministry, while Tanya Fir, Whitney Issik, Ric McIver, Jason Nixon and Prasad Panda were dropped entirely. The labour and housing ministries were eliminated. The number of female cabinet ministers dropped from eight to five.

=== Post-2023 election Cabinet shuffle (June 2023–May 2025) ===
On June 9, 2023, Smith shuffled her cabinet following the May 2023 election, which returned a smaller United Conservative Party majority government. Incumbent ministers Kaycee Madu, Nicholas Milliken, Jeremy Nixon, Jason Copping, Josephine Pon, Jason Luan, and Tyler Shandro were defeated in the election. Among the changes in the shuffle, Nate Horner was appointed the new minister of finance, Mickey Amery the new justice minister, and Mike Ellis was named deputy premier. Amery was the first Muslim to be justice minister. RJ Sigurdson, Searle Turton and Dan Williams joined cabinet for the first time, while Fir, McIver and Muhammad Yaseen returned to cabinet. The number of women ministers remained stable at five.

On February 25, 2025, Peter Guthrie resigned as Minister of Infrastructure, citing concerns over the government's procurement practices.

=== 2025 Cabinet shuffle (May 2025–May 2026) ===
On May 13, 2025, Municipal Affairs Minister Ric McIver resigned and was subsequently elected Speaker of the Legislative Assembly of Alberta.

On May 16, 2025, Smith announced a cabinet shuffle. The cabinet totalled 25 ministers, two associate ministers and eight parliamentary secretaries in a non-cabinet role. Myles McDougall was appointed Minister of Advanced Education, Rajan Sawhney as Minister of Indigenous Relations, and Joseph Schow overseeing Jobs, Economy, Trade and Immigration. Rick Wilson assumed the Mental Health and Addiction portfolio, Dan Williams became Minister of Municipal Affairs, and Andrew Boitchenko took on Tourism and Sport. The Ministry of Health was split, with Matt Jones taking on Hospital and Surgical Health Services and Adriana LaGrange was named Minister of Primary and Preventive Health Services. Two titles were adjusted, with Demetrios Nicolaides named the Minister of Education and Childcare and Jason Nixon named Minister of Assisted Living and Social Services.

=== 2026 Cabinet shuffle (May 2026–present) ===
In May 2026, Cabinet ministers Matt Jones and Nate Horner resigned. Horner was replaced by Jason Nixon as finance minister, Jones was replaced by Adriana LaGrange, Justin Wright and Tara Sawyer entered Cabinet, and RJ Sigurdson and Nathan Neudorf were given new portfolios.

== List of ministers ==
Smith ministry by portfolio
Portfolio	Minister	Tenure	
Portfolio	Minister	Start	End
Premier of Alberta	Danielle Smith	October 11, 2022	Present
Deputy Premier of Alberta	Kaycee Madu	October 21, 2022	June 9, 2023
Deputy Premier of Alberta	Nathan Neudorf	October 21, 2022	June 9, 2023
Deputy Premier of Alberta	Mike Ellis	June 9, 2023	Present
Minister of Advanced Education	Demetrios Nicolaides	October 21, 2022	June 9, 2023
Minister of Advanced Education	Rajan Sawhney	June 9, 2023	May 16, 2025
Minister of Advanced Education	Myles McDougall	May 16, 2025	Present
Minister of Affordability and Utilities	Matt Jones	October 21, 2022	June 9, 2023
Minister of Affordability and Utilities	Nathan Neudorf	June 9, 2023	May 20, 2026
Minister of Affordability and Utilities	RJ Sigurdson	May 21, 2026	Present
Minister of Agriculture and Irrigation	Nate Horner	October 21, 2022	June 9, 2023
Minister of Agriculture and Irrigation	RJ Sigurdson	June 9, 2023	May 20, 2026
Minister of Agriculture and Irrigation	Tara Sawyer	May 21, 2026	Present
Minister of Children and Family Services (Note: "Children's Services" from October 11, 2022, to June 9, 2023.)	Mickey Amery	October 21, 2022	June 9, 2023
Minister of Children and Family Services	Searle Turton	June 9, 2023	Present
Minister of Arts, Culture and Status of Women (Note: "Culture" from October 11, 2022, to June 9, 2023.)	Jason Luan	October 21, 2022	June 9, 2023
Minister of Arts, Culture and Status of Women	Tanya Fir	June 9, 2023	Present
Minister of Education and Childcare (Note: "Education" until May 16, 2025)	Adriana LaGrange	October 21, 2022	June 9, 2023
Minister of Education and Childcare	Demetrios Nicolaides	June 9, 2023	Present
Minister of Energy and Minerals (Note: "Energy" from October 11, 2022, to June 9, 2023)	Peter Guthrie	October 21, 2022	June 9, 2023
Minister of Energy and Minerals	Brian Jean	June 9, 2023	Present
Minister of Environment and Protected Areas	Sonya Savage	October 21, 2022	June 9, 2023
Minister of Environment and Protected Areas	Rebecca Schulz	June 9, 2023	January 2, 2026
Minister of Environment and Protected Areas	Grant Hunter	January 2, 2026	Present
Minister of Finance and President of Treasury Board	Travis Toews	October 21, 2022	June 9, 2023
Minister of Finance and President of Treasury Board	Nate Horner	June 9, 2023	May 20, 2026
Minister of Finance and President of Treasury Board	Jason Nixon	May 21, 2026	Present
Minister of Forestry and Parks (Note: "Forestry, Parks and Tourism" from October 11, 2022, to June 9, 2023.)	Todd Loewen	October 21, 2022	Present
Minister of Health	Jason Copping	October 21, 2022	June 9, 2023
Minister of Health	Adriana LaGrange	June 9, 2023	May 16, 2025 (Note: "Health" split into "Hospital and Surgical Health Services" and "Primary and Preventive Health Services")
Minister of Hospital and Surgical Health Services	Matt Jones	May 16, 2025	May 20, 2026
Minister of Hospital and Surgical Health Services	Adriana LaGrange	May 21, 2026	Present
Minister of Primary and Preventive Health Services	Adriana LaGrange	May 16, 2025	May 20, 2026
Minister of Primary and Preventive Health Services	Justin Wright	May 21, 2026	Present
Minister of Indigenous Relations	Rick Wilson	October 21, 2022	May 16, 2025
Minister of Indigenous Relations	Rajan Sawhney	May 16, 2025	Present
Minister of Infrastructure	Peter Guthrie	June 9, 2023	February 25, 2025
Minister of Infrastructure	Martin Long	February 27, 2025	Present
Minister of Jobs, Economy and Trade (Note: "Jobs, Economy and Northern Development" from October 11, 2022, to June 9, 2023.)	Brian Jean	October 21, 2022	June 9, 2023
Minister of Jobs, Economy and Trade	Matt Jones	June 9, 2023	May 16, 2025
Minister of Jobs, Economy and Trade	Joseph Schow	May 16, 2025	Present
Minister of Justice	Tyler Shandro	October 21, 2022	June 9, 2023
Minister of Justice	Mickey Amery	June 9, 2023	Present
Minister of Mental Health and Addictions	Nicholas Milliken	October 21, 2022	June 9, 2023
Minister of Mental Health and Addictions	Dan Williams	June 9, 2023	May 16, 2025
Minister of Mental Health and Addictions	Rick Wilson	May 16, 2025	Present
Minister of Municipal Affairs	Rebecca Schulz	October 21, 2022	June 9, 2023
Minister of Municipal Affairs	Ric McIver	June 9, 2023	May 13, 2025
Minister of Municipal Affairs	Dan Williams	May 16, 2025	Present
Minister of Public Safety and Emergency Services (Note: "Public Safety" from October 11, 2022, to June 9, 2023.)	Mike Ellis	October 21, 2022	Present
Minister of Assisted Living and Social Services (Note: "Seniors, Community and Social Services" until May 16, 2025)	Jeremy Nixon	October 21, 2022	June 9, 2023
Minister of Assisted Living and Social Services	Jason Nixon	June 9, 2023	May 20, 2026
Minister of Assisted Living and Social Services	Nathan Neudorf	May 21, 2026	Present
Minister of Service Alberta and Red Tape Reduction	Dale Nally	October 21, 2022	Present
Minister of Technology and Innovation	Nate Glubish	October 21, 2022	Present
Minister of Tourism and Sport	Joseph Schow	June 9, 2023	May 16, 2025
Minister of Tourism and Sport	Andrew Boitchenko	May 16, 2025	Present
Minister of Immigration and Multiculturalism (Note: "Trade, Immigration and Multiculturalism" from October 11, 2022, to June 9, 2023.)	Rajan Sawhney	October 21, 2022	June 9, 2023
Minister of Immigration and Multiculturalism	Muhammad Yaseen	June 9, 2023	Present
Minister of Transportation and Economic Corridors	Devin Dreeshen	October 21, 2022	Present

== See also ==
- Premiership of Danielle Smith
- Executive Council of Alberta
- List of Alberta provincial ministers
