= Jason Nixon =

Canadian politician (born 1980)

The Honourable Jason Nixon ECA MLA
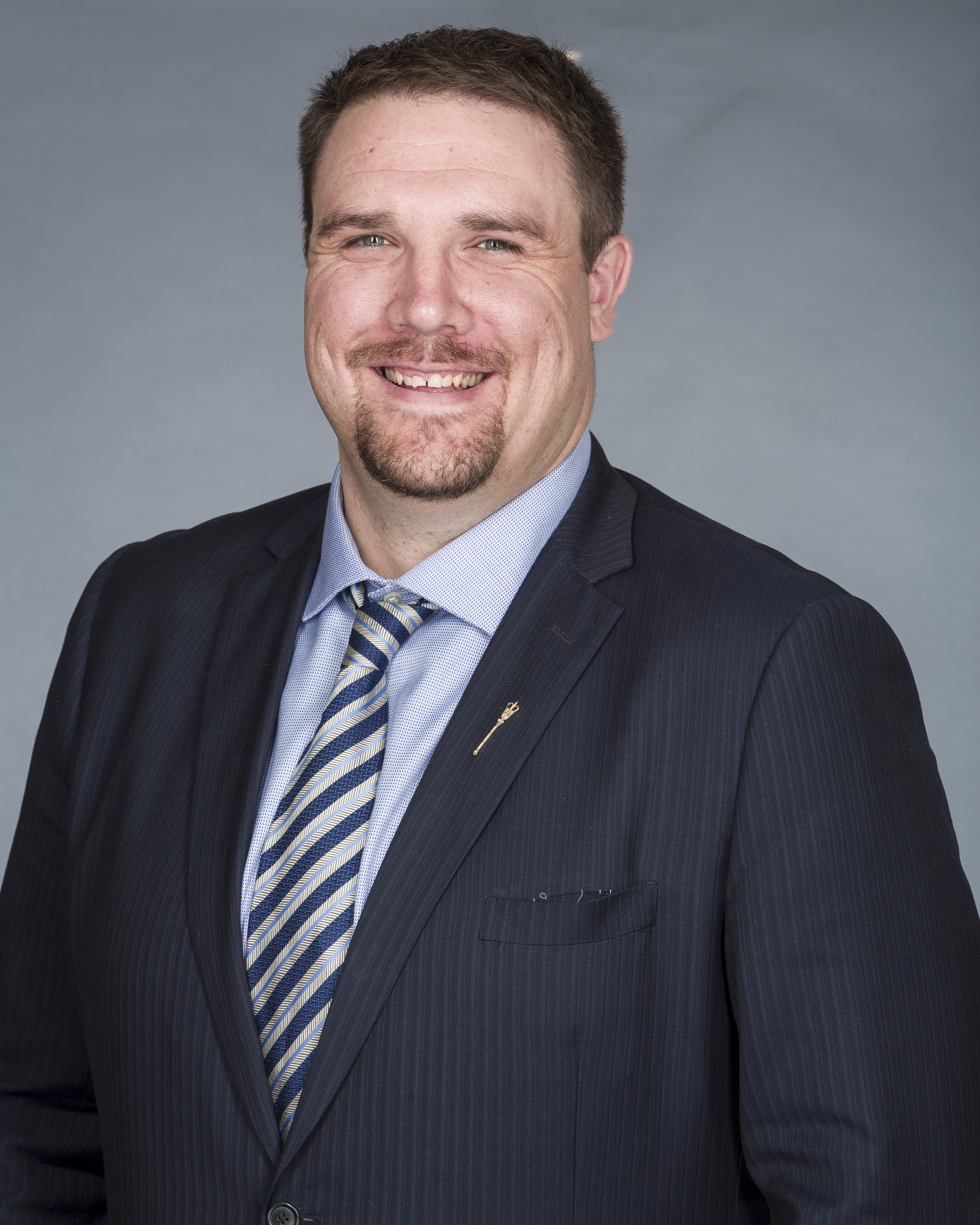

Minister of Finance and President of Treasury Board
- Incumbent
- Assumed office May 21, 2026
- Premier: Danielle Smith
- Preceded by: Nate Horner
- In office June 20, 2022 – October 21, 2022
- Premier: Jason Kenney; Danielle Smith
- Preceded by: Travis Toews
- Succeeded by: Travis Toews

Minister of Assisted Living and Social Services
- In office June 9, 2023 – May 21, 2026
- Premier: Danielle Smith
- Preceded by: Jeremy Nixon
- Succeeded by: Nathan Neudorf

Minister of Environment and Parks of Alberta
- In office April 30, 2019 – June 20, 2022
- Premier: Jason Kenney
- Preceded by: Shannon Phillips
- Succeeded by: Whitney Issik

Leader of the Opposition in Alberta
- In office October 30, 2017 – January 29, 2018
- Preceded by: Nathan Cooper
- Succeeded by: Jason Kenney

Member of the Legislative Assembly of Alberta for Rimbey-Rocky Mountain House-Sundre
- Incumbent
- Assumed office May 5, 2015
- Preceded by: Joe Anglin

Personal details
- Born: Jason John Nixon; May 26, 1980 (age 46) Calgary, Alberta, Canada
- Party: United Conservative (2017-present)
- Other political affiliations: Wildrose Party (until 2017), Conservative Party of Canada
- Spouse: Tiffany Nixon
- Children: 3
- Education: Athabasca University, Southern Alberta Institute of Technology
- Portfolio: Chief Opposition Whip
- Website: https://jasonnixon.ucp2023.ca/

Jason John Nixon ECA MLA (born May 26, 1980) is a Canadian politician who has served as the member of the Legislative Assembly of Alberta representing the electoral district of Rimbey-Rocky Mountain House-Sundre since 2015. In the Smith ministry, he has served as the minister of finance since 2026, having previously held the position in 2022. Nixon also served as the Leader of the Opposition in Alberta from 2017 to 2018.

== Life and career ==
From 2006 to 2011, Nixon served as the executive director at The Mustard Seed, a non-profit organization founded by his father Pat Nixon dedicated to helping the homeless. Nixon took online courses at both the Southern Alberta Institute of Technology and Athabasca University.

Nixon graduated from Southern Alberta Institute of Technology in 2011 with a management major, but he continued to take classes in Athabasca University. In 2014, Nixon was elected president of the Athabasca University Student Union.

He and his brother Jeremy Nixon are the first brothers to serve in the Alberta legislature at the same time.

He was first elected as a member of the Wildrose Party in 2015, and then he served on the negotiation team that created a framework for unity between the Wildrose Party and the Progressive Conservative Party of Alberta. The agreement was ratified and approved by the members of both parties in July 2017, establishing the United Conservative Party (UCP).

After the merger, Nixon endorsed Jason Kenney in the 2017 United Conservative Party leadership election. After Kenney was elected as the leader, Nixon served as Leader of the Official Opposition in Alberta until Kenney won a seat (Calgary-Lougheed) in the Alberta legislature in a by-election. Nixon later served as the Opposition House Leader in the Legislative Assembly of Alberta. He has previously served as the Wildrose opposition critic for Human Services and was a participant on the government's Ministerial Panel on Child Intervention.

After winning the 2019 election on the UCP ticket, he was sworn in as Alberta's Minister of Environment and Parks on April 30, 2019. Before the election, he was a vocal opponent to the previous Minister, Shannon Phillips, especially in relation to the proposed Bighorn Wildland Provincial Park.

== Environmental views ==
According to a biography on his website, he has worked in Alberta's oil and gas industry. His wife works for a pipeline company.

While Nixon was the Leader of the Opposition in Alberta, he was vocal in his opposition to the proposed Bighorn Wildland Provincial Park, calling the plan a: "foreign-funded plot to wall off the back country to Albertans who call the region home."

As the newly appointed Minister, he announced plans to stop the project entirely.

[Nixon said] that he is pleased that the NDPs plans to make changes to the Big Horn Country will not happen. “They are completely stopped,” he said, adding that the UCP is looking at increasing investment in the area.

Other plans include possibly re-writing Alberta's provincial park legislation to be more friendly to agribusiness, forestry, mining, and oil and gas extraction, and cancelling Alberta's climate leadership plan that was implemented under the previous NDP government.

== Controversies ==
A 2005 incident resurfaced in the press in 2017, regarding a female safety officer at Nixon's company Nixon Safety Consulting (NSC). In 2005, a mother of three was sexually harassed by an independent contractor working on a NSC project. Adjudicator Kurt Neuenfeldt wrote in his December 30, 2008 British Columbia Human Rights Tribunal ruling that the contractor "sexually harassed " the female employee, and "that NSC terminated her employment" at the "urging" of Navigator, and Con-Forte when Harrison complained. In December 2008, the tribunal found that Nixon Safety Consulting, and the other respondents had discriminated against the woman. Navigator and Con-Forte were ordered to pay her lost wages, $14,144, an additional $15,000 compensation for injury to her dignity, feelings and self-respect, and $3,000 for improper conduct during the hearing.

By 2008, Nixon was working as manager of the Mountain Aire Lodge addiction treatment facility on the Red River near Sundre. Nixon's father Pat, was the founder of the Mustard Seed that runs the Mountain Aire Lodge. On February 6, 2009, Nixon was part of a group who shot a deer on Allison Gentry's family's property, the Sixty-One Ranch near Cremona, Alberta. In June 2011, Nixon pleaded guilty to a charge of poaching which resulted in a $500 fine. In February 2011, Nixon signed a one-year peace bond and paid a surety of $2000. He agreed to stay 500 metres away from Gentry's property and have no contact with her for a year. The bond was in response to threat of injury/damage charges against him in which he had "caused Allison Gentry to fear" that he would "cause personal injury to her", in that on November 6, 2009, Nixon "did harm Allison Gentry". Gentry, who lived alone on her property with her mother, was driving her truck around the perimeter of her property when she heard gunshots then saw several men armed with long guns including Nixon. They had just shot a deer near a No Hunting sign. A neighbour arrived and they both took photos of the incident as evidence. She confronted the men, and Nixon, who is 203 cm (6 ft 8 in) tall, intimidated her when she accused him of poaching. Nixon turned to his friends and said, "Somebody just want to shoot the b-ch?" Though Nixon signed the peace bond for charges related to the threat of injury/damage regarding the alleged incident, he later denied the claims. Alberta Fish and Wildlife officer, Adam Mirus, who led the investigation into the 2009 allegation interviewed Nixon and the others and recorded the interviews in his truck. Mirus returned to Nixon's Mountain Aire lodge for further interviews on January 4, 2010, and Nixon expressed his displeasure with the ongoing investigation. Charges were laid against Nixon for uttering threats and obstructing an officer. He was found not guilty of both charges in June 2011. The assault charge involving Gentry was dropped a few months earlier, in February 2011, when Nixon agreed to enter into a peace bond.

During Nixon's 2011 trial, the video of the interview was submitted as evidence and was played in court and the contents were later reported in a subsequent March 8, 2011 Mountain View Gazette article. The Alberta judge who had served as Progressive Conservative MLA in the Calgary-Lougheed riding from 1997 until 2004, Marlene Graham, found Nixon not guilty of the charges against the Fish and Wildlife officer. Judge Graham delayed a scheduled hearing on the request to make the 2011 trial video of the confrontation between Nixon and the Alberta Fish and Wildlife officer public as requested by a journalist. In 2019, United Conservative Party lawyers representing Nixon who was then a newly elected MLA, succeeded in having the media blocked from releasing the video evidence from the 2011 court case to the public in an April 2019 ruling in a provincial court in Didsbury by Judge Graham. Judge Graham said that the "risk of harm and prejudice to Mr. Nixon outweighs any interest that the public might have in seeing this DVD." The contents of the video which are publicly available are now covered by a publication ban.

An informant claimed that Nixon, Gary Cape, Earl Anderson, and a youth had been involved in shooting a pregnant wild horse near Sundre, Alberta, in April 2009. They were charged and arrested in January 2010 for "wilfully killing cattle and careless use of a firearm" in 2009. From 2001 to 2010 there were about 30 equine killings in the Sundre area near the Mountain Aire Lodge. The Wild Horses of Alberta Society had offered a $25,000 reward leading to a conviction of those responsible. On April 27, 2011, the case against all four was closed and all charges were dropped because of lack of conclusive evidence. In an April 2011 Calgary Herald column, since retracted, Licia Corbella described how Nixon was arrested with force by 10 RCMP officers. This was denied by the RCMP. On December 3, 2012, William Klym submitted a statement of claim on behalf of the four men in the Alberta Court of Queen's Bench in Calgary in a multimillion-dollar negligence lawsuit against the RCMP officers involved. The statement of claim said that the informant was unreliable and was motivated by the reward. They said that because of the charges they had lost their jobs at the addictions treatment facility at Mountain Aire Lodge near Sundre.

From 2013 to 2015 Nixon, who was then a Wildrose candidate in Rimbey-Rocky Mountain House-Sundre and was taking online courses at Athabasca University, also served as Athabasca University Students’ Union (AUSU) president. In 2015, his student union voted to expel him from the organization for allegedly taking an executive director salary while not working for six months, interfering with the student newspaper, raising executive salaries without student consultation, and other bylaw violations. According to the student news magazine, the raises he initiated made him the "highest paid Student Executive in Alberta. And not by a few dollars, but by more than 30%."

In 2019, the former MLA for Rimbey-Rocky Mountain House-Sundre Joe Anglin asked the RCMP to investigate Nixon for obstruction of justice.

On May 13, 2019, Nixon sent a fundraising communiqué to UCP party supporters, asking them to make a "small donation" to support cuts to the corporate tax rate, and scrapping the provincial carbon tax. This — and another fundraising communication from Kenney's office — resulted in the NDP opposition filing an ethics complaint on the basis of improper use of the office of the premier for party fundraising.

In June 2019, he was the subject of a point of privilege raised by the NDP, claiming Nixon, "deliberately misled the legislature when he said no one used the earplugs distributed by Premier Jason Kenney during last week's debate on a bill to delay wage talks for 180,000 public sector workers." On June 18, 2019, as UCP house leader, Nixon announced a nine-hour total limit on debate on the "contentious" and "controversial" Public Sector Wage Arbitration Deferral Act (Bill 9)— the "bargaining rights bill"— intended to delay hearings on wage arbitration for 180,000 public service employees represented by unions in 24 collective agreements. At 11:25 Wednesday night, in the middle of a speech by New Democrat MLA Thomas Dang in the all-night marathon session of debate prior to Bill 9's passage on the morning of June 20, Premier Kenney passed out orange earplugs to UCP MLAs in the legislature and about six people used them including Nixon. When accused of lying and of being disrespectful of the thousands of public health workers whose wages were frozen, both Kenney and Nixon offered explanations: the earplugs were intended to "boost" UCP MLA's morale; no one used them, and they were intended for one MLA who "suffers from tinnitus". Nixon said that when he stated no one from the government used the earplugs, he was referring only to cabinet members. Both the NDP whip David Eggen and Dang said they saw Nixon wearing the earplugs. Nathan Cooper, the Speaker of the house ruled that based on Beauchesne's Parliamentary Rules and Forms, the Speaker "has to accept what members say about themselves." Cooper said that, in "addition to the statement being misleading — the member must have known it was inaccurate and uttered it to deliberately mislead other members". Cooper found that the NDP "were 'rightly' offended by the earplugs incident"; however, the incident involving Nixon did not "merit a point of privilege", which is a very serious matter.

Nixon said on March 3, 2020, that Alberta's provincial parks, recreation and protected areas were only generating $36 million annually while costing $86 million of tax payers dollars. The March 5 publication—"Optimizing Alberta Parks"—listed the various actions the government would undertake in 2020 as part of a cost-saving initiative. This included "fully or partially closing 20 provincial parks" with 164 other parks being handed to "third-party managers". This represents "more than one-third of all the province's parks, recreation areas and other protected areas." While the "Optimizing Alberta Parks" statement included the possibly of selling Crown land, Nixon said in a March 5 Calgary Herald interview, "We are not selling any Crown or public land — period." However, the province listed a 65-hectare plot of land east of Taber in a March 31 auction with a starting bid of $440,000.

During the legislative session on May 9, 2020, Nixon was caught on tape laughing while an NDP MLA was presenting his concerns about the 4,000 Albertans with Type A diabetes who depended on the Alberta's Insulin Pump Therapy Program, that the UCP had just cancelled. During the May 10 session MLA Janis Irwin said that when Nixon was laughing, there were 25 Albertans present in the legislature who had come to express concerns about cuts to the program. When she asked what was so "funny about Albertans losing their coverage for life-saving insulin pumps, Nixon responded that Irwin's behaviour was "ridiculous" and he "condemned the Official Opposition for continuing to play politics". He denied laughing "at people that were in that situation"; he said he was laughing at a private joke shared between colleagues while the NDP MLA was speaking, not at the Opposition's comments.

== Electoral history ==
2023 Alberta general election: Rimbey-Rocky Mountain House-Sundre
Party	Candidate	Votes	%	±%
United Conservative	Jason Nixon	15,571	69.46	-12.18
Independent	Tim Hoven	3,393	15.14	–
New Democratic	Vance Buchwald	3,118	13.91	+4.81
Independent	Fred Schwieger	135	0.60	–
Advantage Party	Carol Nordlund Kinsey	103	0.46	-0.18
Wildrose Loyalty Coalition	Tami Tatlock	96	0.43	–
Total		22,416	99.37	–
Rejected and declined		142	0.63	
Turnout		22,558	64.89	
Eligible voters		34,766		
United Conservative hold		Swing		-13.66
Source(s) Source: Elections Alberta

2019 Alberta general election: Rimbey-Rocky Mountain House-Sundre
Party	Candidate	Votes	%	±%
United Conservative	Jason Nixon	20,579	81.64	+9.28
New Democratic	Jeff Ible	2,293	9.10	-8.10
Alberta Party	Joe Anglin	1,350	5.36	+4.85
Freedom Conservative	Dawn Berard	303	1.20	–
Green	Jane Drummond	286	1.13	+1.04
Alberta Independence	David Rogers	185	0.73	–
Alberta Advantage Party	Paula Lamoureux	161	0.64	–
Independent	Gordon Francey	50	0.20	–
Total		25,207	99.26	–
Rejected, spoiled and declined		189	0.74	
Turnout		25,396	75.36	
Eligible voters		33,699		
United Conservative notional hold		Swing		+8.69
Source(s) Source: "80 - Rimbey-Rocky Mountain House-Sundre, 2019 Alberta general election". officialresults.elections.ab.ca. Elections Alberta. Alberta. Chief Electoral Officer (2019). 2019 General Election. A Report of the Chief Electoral Officer. Volume II (PDF) (Report). Vol. 2. Edmonton, Alta.: Elections Alberta. pp. 386–393. ISBN 978-1-988620-12-1.

2015 Alberta general election: Rimbey-Rocky Mountain House-Sundre
Party	Candidate	Votes	%	±%
Wildrose	Jason Nixon	6,670	40.11%	-11.31%
Progressive Conservative	Tammy Coté	5,296	31.85%	-8.70%
New Democratic	Hannah Schlamp	2,791	16.78%	11.58%
Independent	Joe Anglin	1,871	11.25%	–
Total		16,628	–	–
Rejected, spoiled and declined		60	37	10
Eligible electors / turnout		32,578	51.26%	-2.47%
Wildrose hold		Swing		-1.30%
Source(s) Source: "77 - Rimbey-Rocky Mountain House-Sundre, 2015 Alberta general election". officialresults.elections.ab.ca. Elections Alberta. Chief Electoral Officer (2016). 2015 General Election. A Report of the Chief Electoral Officer (PDF) (Report). Edmonton, Alta.: Elections Alberta. pp. 411–412.
