= Rod Fox =

Canadian politician

Rod Fox MLA
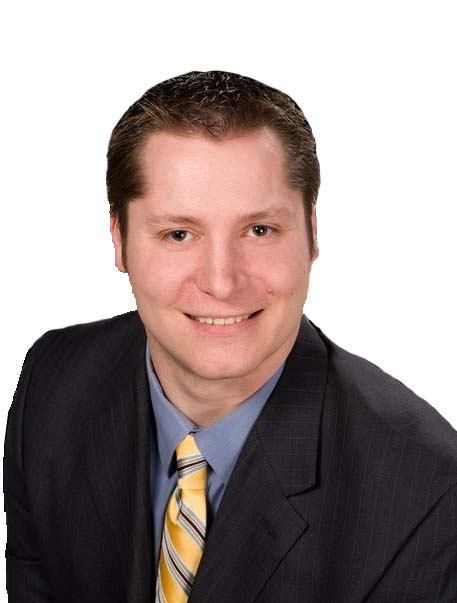

MLA for Lacombe-Ponoka
- In office 2012–2015
- Preceded by: Ray Prins
- Succeeded by: Ron Orr

Personal details
- Born: 1980 (age 45–46) Whitecourt, Alberta
- Party: Wildrose (2012-2014); Alberta Progressive Conservative Party (2014-present)
- Profession: Insurance
- Website: rodfox.ca

Rodney M. "Rod" Fox (born c. 1981) is a Canadian politician who is a former elected member to the Legislative Assembly of Alberta representing the electoral district of Lacombe-Ponoka.

Fox's professional background is in insurance, finance, marketing, managing, and business relations. Before his election as an MLA, Fox was employed as the sales manager in the four western provinces for the largest Canadian owned insurance premium finance company, IFS Inc.

Fox has served as a director on the Lacombe Economic Development Board, and ran as a candidate in the 2007 Lacombe municipal election. He is also a past policy director and past president of the federal Wetaskiwin Conservative Association, and a former director of communications for MP Blaine Calkins in 2009 and 2011.

In the spring 2013 sitting of the Legislative Assembly of Alberta, Fox pushed the government to amend the rules governing condominiums. He also supported the federal government and Canadian Radio-television and Telecommunications Commission changing the rules for cell phone companies regarding cell phone contracts in favour of consumers.

On December 17, 2014, he was one of nine Wildrose MLAs who crossed the floor to join the Alberta Progressive Conservative Party caucus. Fox lost the PC nomination vote to Peter Dewit in Lacombe-Ponoka.

== Electoral history ==
2012 Alberta general election: Lacombe-Ponoka
Party	Candidate	Votes	%	±%
Wildrose	Rod Fox	6,573	43.97%	37.51%
Progressive Conservative	Steve Christie	5,363	35.88%	-22.30%
New Democratic	Doug Hart	1,479	9.89%	5.92%
Alberta Party	Tony Jeglum	781	5.22%	–
Liberal	Kyle Michael Morrow	753	5.04%	-3.47%
Total		14,949	–	–
Rejected, spoiled, and declined		99	–	–
Eligible electors / turnout		26,490	56.81%	12.81%
Wildrose gain from Progressive Conservative		Swing		-13.60%
Source(s) Source: "66 - Lacombe-Ponoka, 2012 Alberta general election". officialresults.elections.ab.ca. Elections Alberta.
