= Lacombe-Ponoka =

Provincial electoral district in Alberta, Canada

Alberta electoral district
- Lacombe-Ponoka within Alberta, 2017 boundaries

Provincial electoral district
- Legislature: Legislative Assembly of Alberta
MLA
Jennifer Johnson
United Conservative
- District created: 2003
- First contested: 2004
- Last contested: 2023

Lacombe-Ponoka is a provincial electoral district in central Alberta, Canada, created in 2003. The district is mandated to return a single member to the Legislative Assembly.

== History ==
The electoral district was created in the 2003 boundary redistribution mostly from the abolished electoral districts of Lacombe-Stettler and Ponoka-Rimbey.

The 2010 boundary redistribution saw the riding lose the town of Rimbey to the new district of Rimbey-Rocky Mountain House-Sundre and it also lost land that resided within Camrose County to the electoral district of Battle River-Wainwright.

=== Boundary history ===
61 Lacombe-Ponoka 2003 boundaries
Bordering districts
North	East	West	South
Drayton Valley-Calmar, Wetaskiwin-Camrose	Battle River-Wainwright	Rocky Mountain House	Drumheller-Stettler, Innisfail-Sylvan Lake, Red Deer-North
riding map goes here			
Legal description from the Statutes of Alberta 2003, Electoral Divisions Act.
Starting at the intersection of Highway 20 and the east boundary of Sec. 16 in Twp. 45, Rge. 3 W5; then 1. east along the north boundary of Secs. 15, 14 and 13 in Rge. 3 W5 and Secs. 18, 17, 16, 15, 14 and 13 in Rge. 2 W5 to the east boundary of Rge. 2 W5; 2. south along the east boundary of Rge. 2 W5 to the north boundary of Sec. 7, Twp. 45, Rge. 1 W5; 3. east along the north boundary of Secs. 7 and 8 to the east boundary of Sec. 8; 4. south along the east boundary of Sec. 8 to the north boundary of the south half of Sec. 9; 5. east along the north boundary of the south half of Secs. 9 and 10 to the east boundary of the west half of Sec. 10; 6. south along the east boundary of the west half of Sec. 10 to the north boundary of Sec. 3 in Twp. 45, Rge. 1 W5; 7. east along the north boundary of Sec. 3 to the east boundary of Sec. 3; 8. south along the east boundary of Sec. 3 to the north boundary of Twp. 44 (Highway 611); 9. east along the north boundary of Twp. 44 to its intersection with the west boundary of the Samson Indian Reserve No. 137 at the east boundary of the west half of Sec. 34, Twp. 44, Rge. 25 W4; 10. generally south, east and north along the boundaries of Indian Reserves of No. 137, 138, 137, 139 and 137 to the north boundary of Twp. 44 at the east boundary of Sec. 5, Twp. 45, Rge. 23 W4; 11. then north along the east boundary of Secs. 5, 8, 17, 20, 29 and 32 in Twp. 45, Rge. 23 W4 to the north boundary of Twp. 45; 12. east along the north boundary of Twp. 45 to Highway 56; 13. south along Highway 56 to the north boundary of Sec. 21 in Twp. 42, Rge. 19 W4; 14. east along the north boundary to the east boundary of the west half of the Sec. 21; 15. south along the east boundary of the west half of Secs. 21, 16, 9 and 4 to the north boundary of Twp. 41 (Highway 53); 16. west along the north boundary to the east boundary of Sec. 34 in Twp. 41, Rge. 20 W4; 17. south along the east boundary of Secs. 34 and 27 to the north boundary of Sec. 22; 18. west along the north boundary to the east shore of Buffalo Lake; 19. in a generally southerly direction along the east shore to the north boundary of Twp. 40; 20. west along the north boundary to the west shore of Buffalo Lake; 21. in a generally southwesterly direction along the west shore to the east boundary of Rge. 22 W4; 22. south along the east boundary of Rge. 22 W4 to the south shore of Buffalo Lake; 23. in an easterly and southwesterly direction along the lake shore to its intersection with the east boundary of Rge. 22 W4; 24. south along the east boundary of Rge. 22 W4 to the north boundary of Sec. 24, Twp. 39, Rge. 22 W4; 25. west along the north boundary of Secs. 24 and 23 to the east boundary of Sec. 22; 26. south along the east boundary of Secs. 22, 15, 10 and 3 to the north boundary of Twp. 38; 27. west along the north boundary of Twp. 38 to the right bank of the Red Deer River; 28. upstream along the right bank of the river to the intersection with the right bank of the Blindman River; 29. upstream along the right bank of the river to its intersection with the east boundary of Rge. 28 W4 in Twp. 39; 30. north along the east boundary of Rge. 28 W4 to the north boundary of Twp. 40, Rge. 28 W4; 31. west along the north boundary of Twp. 40, Rge. 28 W4 to the east shore of Gull Lake; 32. northwest along the east shore of Gull Lake to the north boundary of Twp. 41; 33. west along the north boundary of Twp. 41 to the east boundary of Rge. 3 W5; 34. north along the east boundary of Rge. 3 W5 to the north boundary of Twp. 42; 35. east along the north boundary of Twp. 42 to Highway 20; 36. northwest along Highway 20 to the starting point.
Note:

66 Lacombe-Ponoka 2010 boundaries
Bordering districts
North	East	West	South
Drayton Valley-Devon and Wetaskiwin-Camrose	Battle River-Wainwright and Drumheller-Stettler	Rimbey-Rocky Mountain House-Sundre	Innisfail-Sylvan Lake
Note: Boundary descriptions were not used in the 2010 redistribution

=== Representation history ===
Members of the Legislative Assembly for Lacombe-Ponoka
Assembly	Years	Member	Party
Riding created from Lacombe-Stettler, Ponoka-Rimbey, and Rocky Mountain House
26th	2004–2008	Ray Prins	Progressive Conservative
27th	2008–2012	Ray Prins	Progressive Conservative
28th	2012–2014	Rod Fox	Wildrose
28th	2014–2015	Rod Fox	Progressive Conservative
29th	2015–2017	Ron Orr	Wildrose
29th	2017-2019	Ron Orr	United Conservative
30th	2019–2023	Ron Orr	United Conservative
31st	2023–2024	Jennifer Johnson	Independent
31st	2024–present	Jennifer Johnson	United Conservative

The electoral district and its predecessor ridings have been returning conservative candidates since the 1970s. The current representative is Ray Prins who was first elected to office in 2004 when the district was created. He represented the district for two terms with majorities well above half the popular vote.

== Legislative election results ==
=== 2023 ===
2023 Alberta general election
Party	Candidate	Votes	%	±%
United Conservative	Jennifer Johnson (Note: On May 24, United Conservative Party leader Danielle Smith announced that Johnson would be excluded from the United Conservative caucus if elected. As this decision came after the deadline for candidate registration, she remained on the ballot as a United Conservative.)	14,324	67.57	-3.74
New Democratic	Dave Dale	4,995	23.56	+8.63
Alberta Party	Myles Chykerda	1,167	5.50	-4.84
Wildrose Loyalty Coalition	Daniel Jeffries	444	2.09	–
Green	Taylor Lowery	196	0.92	–
Solidarity Movement	Nathan Leslie	74	0.35	–
Total		21,200	99.40	–
Rejected and declined		128	0.60	
Turnout		21,328	61.28	
Eligible voters		34,804		
United Conservative hold		Swing		-6.19
Source(s) Source: Elections Alberta

=== 2019 ===
2019 Alberta general election
Party	Candidate	Votes	%	±%
United Conservative	Ron Orr	17,379	71.31	+8.03
New Democratic	Doug Hart	3,639	14.93	-15.17
Alberta Party	Myles Chykerda	2,520	10.34	+3.72
Freedom Conservative	Keith Parrill	328	1.35	–
Alberta Independence	Tessa Szwagierczak	279	1.14	–
Advantage	Shawn Tylke	227	0.93	–
Total		24,372	99.26	–
Rejected, spoiled and declined		181	0.74	+0.28
Turnout		24,553	75.07	+15.74
Eligible voters		32,706		
United Conservative notional hold		Swing		+11.60
Source(s) Source: "68 - Lacombe-Ponoka, 2019 Alberta general election". officialresults.elections.ab.ca. Elections Alberta.

=== 2015 ===
2015 Alberta general election
Party	Candidate	Votes	%	±%
Wildrose	Ron Orr	6,502	35.71%	-8.26%
New Democratic	Doug Hart	5,481	30.10%	20.21%
Progressive Conservative	Peter Dewit	5,018	27.56%	-8.31%
Alberta Party	Tony Jeglum	1,206	6.62%	1.40%
Total		18,207	–	–
Rejected, spoiled and declined		83	–	–
Eligible electors / turnout		30,827	59.33%	2.52%
Wildrose hold		Swing		-1.24%
Source(s) Source: "66 - Lacombe-Ponoka, 2015 Alberta general election". officialresults.elections.ab.ca. Elections Alberta.

=== 2012 ===
2012 Alberta general election
Party	Candidate	Votes	%	±%
Wildrose	Rod Fox	6,573	43.97%	37.51%
Progressive Conservative	Steve Christie	5,363	35.88%	-22.30%
New Democratic	Doug Hart	1,479	9.89%	5.92%
Alberta Party	Tony Jeglum	781	5.22%	–
Liberal	Kyle Michael Morrow	753	5.04%	-3.47%
Total		14,949	–	–
Rejected, spoiled, and declined		99	–	–
Eligible electors / turnout		26,490	56.81%	12.81%
Wildrose gain from Progressive Conservative		Swing		-13.60%
Source(s) Source: "66 - Lacombe-Ponoka, 2012 Alberta general election". officialresults.elections.ab.ca. Elections Alberta.

=== 2008 ===
2008 Alberta general election
Party	Candidate	Votes	%	±%
Progressive Conservative	Ray Prins	8,202	58.17%	5.25%
Green	Joe Anglin	3,226	22.88%	–
Liberal	Edith McPhedran	1,200	8.51%	-8.42%
Wildrose	Daniel Friesen	911	6.46%	-11.50%
New Democratic	Steven P. Bradshaw	560	3.97%	-4.69%
Total		14,099	–	–
Rejected, spoiled and declined		68	–	–
Eligible electors / turnout		32,200	44.00%	-5.89%
Progressive Conservative hold		Swing		0.16%
Source(s) Source: "61 - Lacombe-Ponoka, 2008 Alberta general election". officialresults.elections.ab.ca. Elections Alberta. The Report on the March 3, 2008 Provincial General Election of the Twenty-seventh Legislative Assembly. Elections Alberta. pp. 450–455.

=== 2004 ===
2004 Alberta general election
Party	Candidate	Votes	%	±%
Progressive Conservative	Ray Prins	6,923	52.93%	–
Alberta Alliance	Ed Klop	2,349	17.96%	–
Liberal	Glen T. Simmonds	2,214	16.93%	–
New Democratic	Jim Graves	1,133	8.66%	–
Social Credit	Teena Cormack	461	3.52%	–
Total		13,080	–	–
Rejected, spoiled and declined		77	–	–
Eligible electors / turnout		26,373	49.89%	–
Progressive Conservative pickup new district.				
Source(s) Source: "Lacombe-Ponoka Statement of Official Results 2004 Alberta general election" (PDF). Elections Alberta.

== Senate nominee election results ==
=== 2004 ===
2004 Senate nominee election results: Lacombe-Ponoka				Turnout 49.84%	
Affiliation	Candidate	Votes	% votes	% ballots	Rank
Progressive Conservative	Betty Unger	4,681	13.96%	44.82%	2
Progressive Conservative	Bert Brown	4,604	13.73%	44.08%	1
Progressive Conservative	Cliff Breitkreuz	4,154	12.38%	39.77%	3
Independent	Link Byfield	3,582	10.68%	34.29%	4
Alberta Alliance	Michael Roth	3,293	9.82%	31.53%	7
Progressive Conservative	Jim Silye	2,977	8.88%	28.50%	5
Alberta Alliance	Vance Gough	2,859	8.53%	27.37%	8
Progressive Conservative	David Usherwood	2,756	8.22%	26.39%	6
Alberta Alliance	Gary Horan	2,729	8.14%	26.13%	10
Independent	Tom Sindlinger	1,900	5.66%	18.19%	9
Total votes		33,535	100%		
Total ballots		10,445	3.21 votes per ballot		
Rejected, spoiled and declined		2,700			

Voters had the option of selecting four candidates on the ballot

== Nomination contests ==
UCP Lacombe-Ponoka nomination contest: February 17, 2023

Candidate	Votes	%
Jennifer Johnson	970	74.9
Dusty Myshrall	278	21.5
Chris Ross	47	3.6
Total	1,295	100.0

== See also ==
- List of Alberta provincial electoral districts
- Canadian provincial electoral districts
