= Bruce Rowe =

Canadian politician

Bruce Rowe MLA
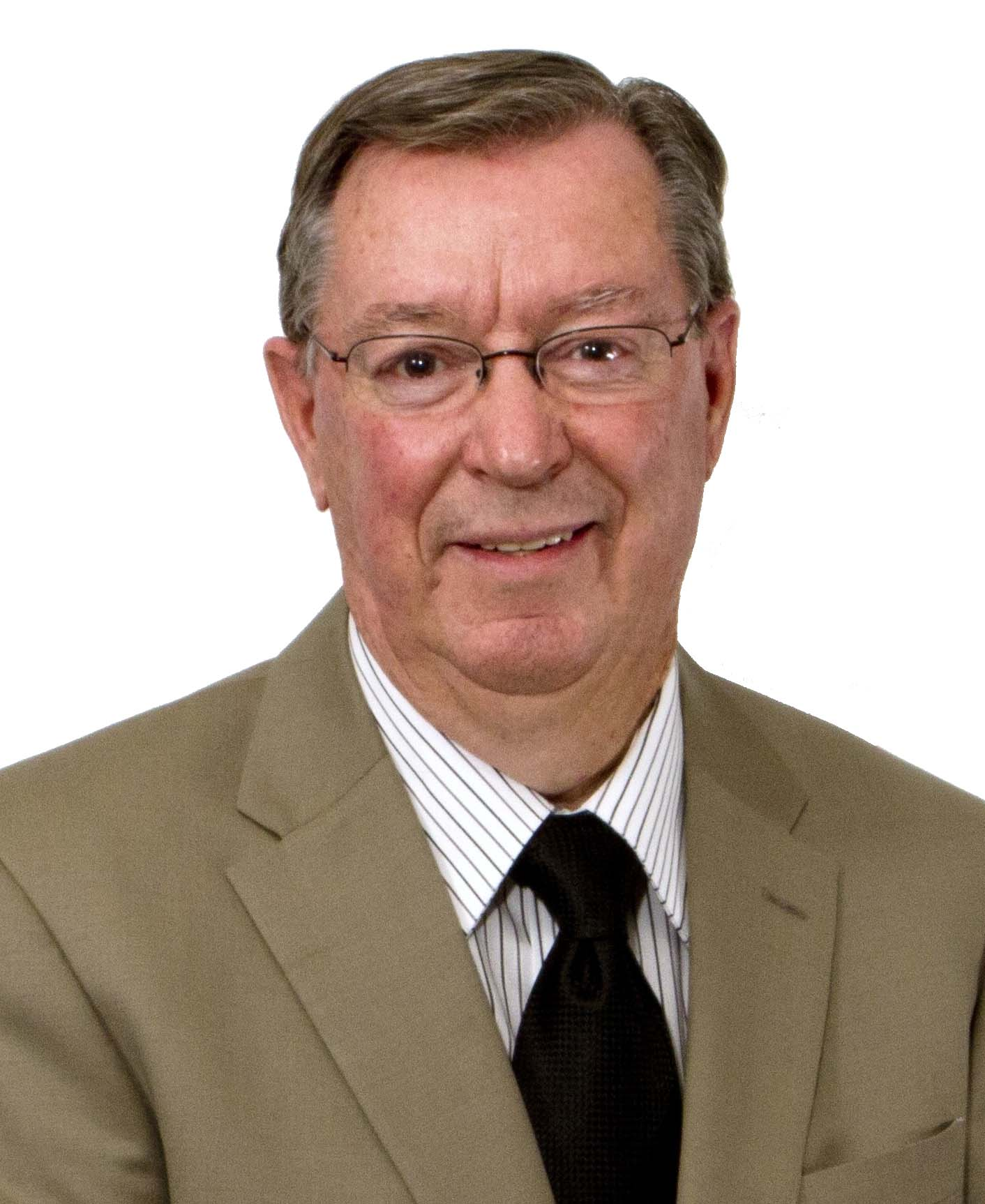

MLA for Olds-Didsbury-Three Hills
- In office April 23, 2012 – May 5, 2015
- Preceded by: Richard Marz
- Succeeded by: Nathan Cooper

Personal details
- Born: Thomas Bruce Rowe; November 8, 1942 (age 83) Moose Jaw, Saskatchewan
- Party: Wildrose (2012-2014); Alberta Progressive Conservative Party (2014-2015)
- Profession: electrical contractor

Thomas Bruce Rowe (born November 8, 1942) is a Canadian politician who was an elected member to the Legislative Assembly of Alberta representing the electoral district of Olds-Didsbury-Three Hills from 2012 until 2015. Prior to the 2012 provincial election Rowe served as mayor of the village of Beiseker, Alberta.

He was elected to the Legislature in 2012 as a member of the Wildrose Party caucus.

Rowe is an electrical contractor by trade, and operated his own small business for 35 years. He was elected to Beiseker village council in 2001, as well as the Alberta Urban Municipalities Association board of directors. He retired from the private sector in 2005 to focus on his political career.

After a shorter than expected spring session sitting of the Legislative Assembly in 2013, Rowe expressed frustration to local media.

On December 17, 2014, he was one of nine Wildrose MLAs who crossed the floor to join the Progressive Conservative caucus. Rowe subsequently announced his retirement from politics and did not seek re-election in the 2015 Alberta general election.

== Electoral history ==
2012 Alberta general election: Olds-Didsbury-Three Hills
Party	Candidate	Votes	%	±%
Wildrose	Bruce Rowe	10,182	56.54	+35.51
Progressive Conservative	Darcy Davis	6,707	37.24	-26.82
New Democratic	Kristie Krezanoski	565	3.14	+0.95
Liberal	Garth E. Davis	555	3.08	-5.40
Total		18,009	99.41	–
Rejected, spoiled, and declined		106	0.59	+0.11
Turnout		18,115	61.11	+13.91
Eligible voters		29,643		
Wildrose gain from Progressive Conservative		Swing		+31.17
Source(s) Source: "73 - Olds-Didsbury-Three Hills, 2012 Alberta general election". officialresults.elections.ab.ca. Elections Alberta.
