= Joe Anglin =

American-born Canadian politician

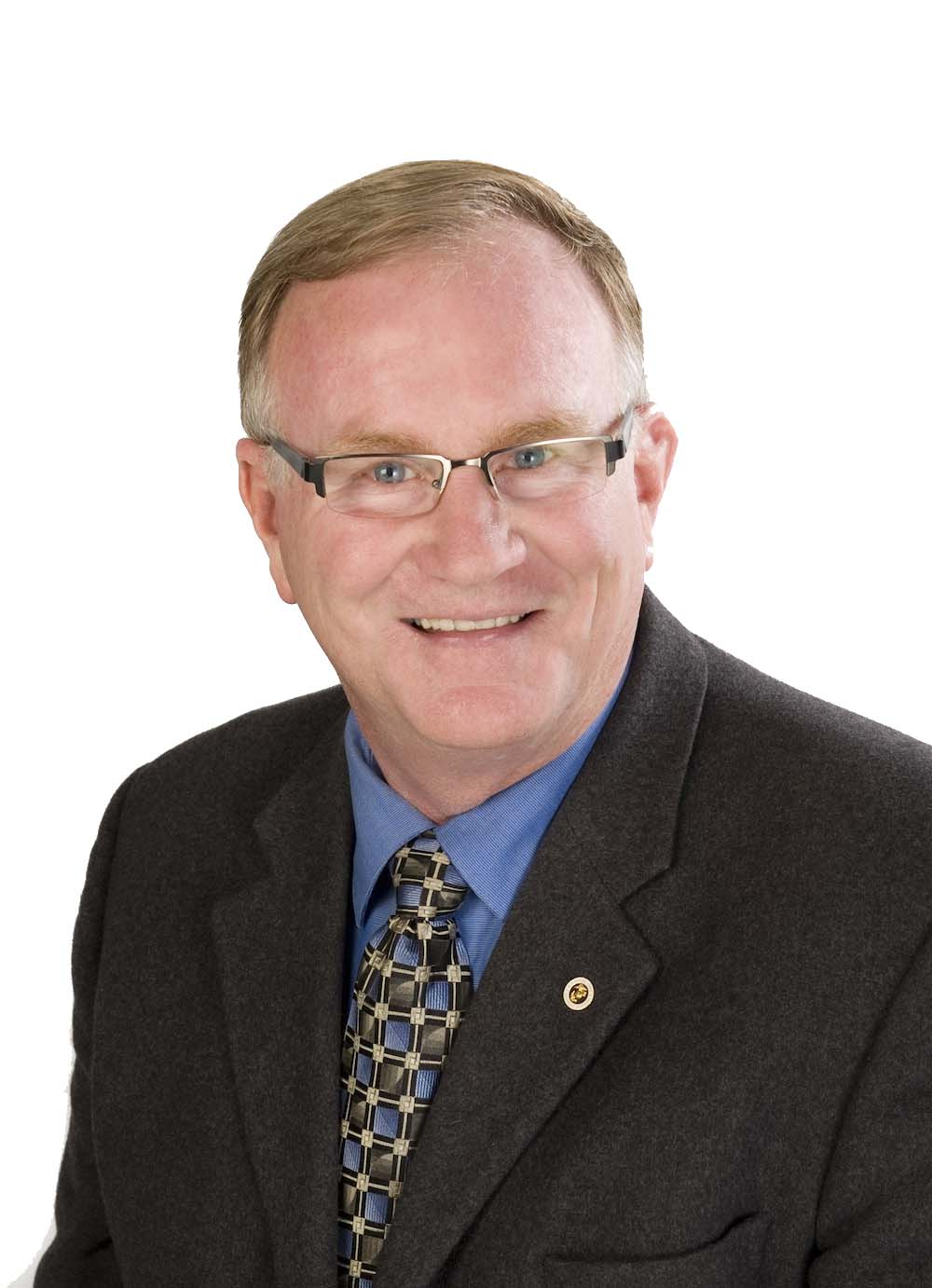
- Former MLA Joe Anglin

MLA for Rimbey-Rocky Mountain House-Sundre
- In office 2012–2015
- Preceded by: Ty Lund
- Succeeded by: Jason Nixon

Leader of the Alberta Greens
- In office 2008–2009
- Preceded by: George Read

Personal details
- Born: 1954 or 1955 (age 70–71) Massachusetts, United States
- Party: Alberta Party (March 2019–present)
- Other political affiliations: Freedom Conservative (2018-2019); Independent (2015–2018); Progressive Conservative (2015); Wildrose (2012–2014); Alberta Greens (2008–2009)
- Website: joeanglin.ca

Joseph V. Anglin is an American-born Canadian politician who lives in Rimbey, Alberta, Canada. He was the leader of the Alberta Greens from 2008 until its dissolution in 2009. In the April 2012 Alberta general election, he was elected as a Member of the Legislative Assembly of Alberta for Rimbey-Rocky Mountain House-Sundre. He was a member of the Wildrose Party until he left its caucus on November 2, 2014. He sat as an independent until his defeat in the May 2015 Alberta general election.

== Early life ==
Anglin was born in Massachusetts. He served in the United States Marine Corps and worked as a police officer in the 1970s. He moved to Canada and obtained Canadian citizenship in 1995. He served in the Canadian Coast Guard for six years. Anglin founded and acted as CEO of ASIG Inc., which operated as an international financial services firm, which specialized in trading derivatives, oil contracts, gas contracts and currencies. Anglin worked as a lineman for a public electric utility before going on to work for AT&T. He obtained a diploma in engineering and worked his way up into executive management. During his time with AT&T he taught fibre-optic transmission engineering at the Bell Labs training facilities in Chicago and served as the White House communications liaison for George H. W. Bush in Kennebunkport, Maine.

== Political career ==
=== Advocacy and local politics ===
Anglin organized and led the Lavesta Area Group, an association of southern Alberta landowners opposed to the construction of a 500 kV electricity transmission line through their area, from 2006 to 2010. He served as chair of the Rimoka Housing Foundation from 2010 to 2012 and also served as a town councillor in Rimbey from 2010 until his election to the Legislative Assembly of Alberta.

Anglin toured dozens of Albertan communities between 2009 and 2012, speaking out against the Electric Statutes Amendment Act (Bill 50), which granted cabinet power to approve major power lines as critical infrastructure without a public hearing and needs assessment by the Alberta Utilities Commission. In response to public criticism of the Act, the government revoked Cabinet's ability to approve critical transmission projects without a needs assessment in the fall of 2012, but the amendment did not affect the four transmission projects that were approved by cabinet under Bill 50 prior to the amendment.

Anglin gained wide public attention in Alberta after he exposed the Energy and Utilities Board for spying on people who opposed power lines being put through their land.

=== Leader of the Alberta Greens ===
Anglin ran for the Alberta Green Party in the Lacombe-Ponoka electoral district in the 2008 Alberta general election. He finished second to incumbent Ray Prins.

Anglin became interim leader of the Green Party in the fall of 2008. The validity of the meeting at which Anglin was elected was challenged by the party's previous leadership. Anglin presided over the dissolution of the party in July 2009. He attributed the party's failure to file required financial returns with Elections Alberta to a refusal by the previous executive to hand over necessary documentation. David Crowe, the previous CFO for the party, has denied Anglin's allegation, and has provided documentation of what he made available to the party and when, indicating that all needed documentation was made available in a timely manner.

=== Member of the Legislative Assembly ===
In 2012, Anglin became a candidate for the Wildrose Party for the riding of Rimbey-Rocky Mountain House-Sundre, which he won in the 2012 general election. Anglin left the Wildrose Party on November 2, 2014, to sit as an independent. In January 2015, he announced that he would seek the Progressive Conservative nomination in his riding. Anglin's candidacy was rejected by the Progressive Conservatives, with the party indicating that allowing his candidacy would not have been in the 'best interests of the party' Anglin opted to run as an independent in his riding, where he finished fourth.

In 2018, Anglin announced his intention to run under the Freedom Conservative banner in the upcoming election. but then ran for the Alberta Party.

He later joined the Alberta Party.

In 2025, Anglin was a guest speaker at an event hosted by the Maskwacis-Wetaskiwin NDP Constituency Association in conjunction with the Alberta NDP Rural Caucus. He also hosted a series of virtual sessions with the Alberta NDP Rural Caucus called "Alberta’s Failed Electricity Deregulation and How to Fix It."

== Electoral results ==
=== 2019 general election ===
2019 Alberta general election: Rimbey-Rocky Mountain House-Sundre
Party	Candidate	Votes	%	±%
United Conservative	Jason Nixon	20,579	81.64	+9.28
New Democratic	Jeff Ible	2,293	9.10	-8.10
Alberta Party	Joe Anglin	1,350	5.36	+4.85
Freedom Conservative	Dawn Berard	303	1.20	–
Green	Jane Drummond	286	1.13	+1.04
Alberta Independence	David Rogers	185	0.73	–
Alberta Advantage Party	Paula Lamoureux	161	0.64	–
Independent	Gordon Francey	50	0.20	–
Total		25,207	99.26	–
Rejected, spoiled and declined		189	0.74	
Turnout		25,396	75.36	
Eligible voters		33,699		
United Conservative notional hold		Swing		+8.69
Source(s) Source: "80 - Rimbey-Rocky Mountain House-Sundre, 2019 Alberta general election". officialresults.elections.ab.ca. Elections Alberta. Alberta. Chief Electoral Officer (2019). 2019 General Election. A Report of the Chief Electoral Officer. Volume II (PDF) (Report). Vol. 2. Edmonton, Alta.: Elections Alberta. pp. 386–393. ISBN 978-1-988620-12-1.

=== 2015 general election ===
2015 Alberta general election: Rimbey-Rocky Mountain House-Sundre
Party	Candidate	Votes	%	±%
Wildrose	Jason Nixon	6,670	40.11%	-11.31%
Progressive Conservative	Tammy Coté	5,296	31.85%	-8.70%
New Democratic	Hannah Schlamp	2,791	16.78%	11.58%
Independent	Joe Anglin	1,871	11.25%	–
Total		16,628	–	–
Rejected, spoiled and declined		60	37	10
Eligible electors / turnout		32,578	51.26%	-2.47%
Wildrose hold		Swing		-1.30%
Source(s) Source: "77 - Rimbey-Rocky Mountain House-Sundre, 2015 Alberta general election". officialresults.elections.ab.ca. Elections Alberta. Chief Electoral Officer (2016). 2015 General Election. A Report of the Chief Electoral Officer (PDF) (Report). Edmonton, Alta.: Elections Alberta. pp. 411–412.

=== 2012 general election ===
2012 Alberta general election: Rimbey-Rocky Mountain House-Sundre
Party	Candidate	Votes	%	±%
Wildrose Alliance	Joe Anglin	7,664	51.42%	–
Progressive Conservative	Ty Lund	6,044	40.55%	–
New Democratic	Doreen Broska	776	5.21%	–
Liberal	Mason Sisson	420	2.82%	–
Total		14,904	–	–
Rejected, spoiled and declined		57	33	8
Eligible electors / turnout		27,863	53.72%	–
Wildrose Alliance pickup new district.				
Source(s) Source: "77 - Rimbey-Rocky Mountain House-Sundre, 2012 Alberta general election". officialresults.elections.ab.ca. Elections Alberta. Chief Electoral Officer (2012). The Report of the Chief Electoral Officer on the 2011 Provincial Enumeration and Monday, April 23, 2012 Provincial General Election of the Twenty-eighth Legislative Assembly (PDF) (Report). Edmonton, Alta.: Elections Alberta. pp. 456–458. Archived (PDF) from the original on May 6, 2021.

=== 2008 general election ===
2008 Alberta general election: Lacombe-Ponoka
Party	Candidate	Votes	%	±%
Progressive Conservative	Ray Prins	8,202	58.17%	5.25%
Green	Joe Anglin	3,226	22.88%	–
Liberal	Edith McPhedran	1,200	8.51%	-8.42%
Wildrose	Daniel Friesen	911	6.46%	-11.50%
New Democratic	Steven P. Bradshaw	560	3.97%	-4.69%
Total		14,099	–	–
Rejected, spoiled and declined		68	–	–
Eligible electors / turnout		32,200	44.00%	-5.89%
Progressive Conservative hold		Swing		0.16%
Source(s) Source: "61 - Lacombe-Ponoka, 2008 Alberta general election". officialresults.elections.ab.ca. Elections Alberta. The Report on the March 3, 2008 Provincial General Election of the Twenty-seventh Legislative Assembly. Elections Alberta. pp. 450–455.
