= Wildrose Party =

Defunct political party in Alberta, Canada

Coordinates: 51.0434°N 114.0744°W

Wildrose Political Association
- Founded: October 25, 2002; Renamed Wildrose Alliance January 31, 2008
- Dissolved: July 24, 2017 (de facto); February 7, 2020 (de jure)
- Merger of: Alberta Alliance Party; Wildrose Party of Alberta
- Merged into: United Conservative Party
- Headquarters: Edmonton, Alberta
- Ideology: Conservatism (Canadian); Grassroots democracy Green conservatism Libertarianism
- Political position: Centre-right to right-wing
- Colours: Blue and Green

The Wildrose Party (legally Wildrose Political Association, formerly the Wildrose Alliance Political Association) was a conservative provincial political party in Alberta, Canada. The party was formed by the merger in early 2008 of the Alberta Alliance Party and the unregistered Wildrose Party of Alberta. The wild rose is Alberta's provincial flower.

It contested the 2008 provincial election under the Wildrose Alliance banner, and received seven percent of the popular vote overall but failed to hold its single seat in the Legislative Assembly. Support for the party rose in 2009 when some voters were frustrated with the Progressive Conservative (PC) government. The party won a surprise win by outgoing leader Paul Hinman in an October by-election. In the fall of 2009 the party members elected Danielle Smith as leader, and by December the Wildrose was leading provincial opinion polls, ahead of both the governing PCs, the opposition Liberals and the other parties. Wildrose's caucus grew to four members in 2010, after two former PC members of the Legislative Assembly defected in January and an independent MLA joined the party in June of that year.

In the 2012 election, the party failed to have the breakthrough predicted by many media pundits, many of whom predicted that it would take a majority or plurality of seats in the Legislature and become the government. However, it increased its vote and seat totals. Securing the second-largest caucus in the Legislature, it was named the official opposition.

In December 2014, nine Wildrose MLAs, including the leader, Danielle Smith, left the party to join the Progressive Conservative caucus under its recently elected leader, Jim Prentice. All of the defectors to the PCs who sought re-election in the 2015 general election lost their seats by not securing the Conservative nomination in their district or in the general election, to a Wildrose challenger.

Effective February 3, 2015, the party's registered name was changed from Wildrose Alliance Party to Wildrose Party.

On May 18, 2017, the leaders of the Wildrose and Progressive Conservative Association of Alberta announced a merger, which was ratified with 95% support of the membership of both parties in July 2017. The combined United Conservative Party held its inaugural leadership election on October 28, 2017. Due to previous legal restrictions that did not formally permit parties to merge or transfer their assets, the PC Party and Wildrose Party maintained a nominal existence and ran one candidate each in the 2019 election in order to prevent forfeiture of their assets. The UCP government later passed legislation allowing parties to merge, clearing the way for the Wildrose to formally dissolve on February 7, 2020.

== History ==
The original Wildrose Alliance logo, used from 2008 to 2010

=== Founding and 2008 general election ===
The Alberta Alliance Party voted to change its registered name on January 19, 2008, to the Wildrose Alliance after it merged with the unregistered Wildrose Party of Alberta. The name officially changed to Wildrose Alliance Party of Alberta after being approved by Elections Alberta on January 31, 2008.

The two parties had similar policies and the Wildrose had key personnel previously involved with the Alberta Alliance. They hoped that a union would allow the new party to present a stronger front for an anticipated election in the spring of 2008. Paul Hinman, the party's only sitting Member of the Legislative Assembly (MLA) remained leader after the merger. During the 27th Alberta general election, the Wildrose Alliance attempted to position itself as a conservative alternative to the governing PC party, and released a platform that promised fixed election dates, increasing personal tax exemptions, elimination of health care premiums, the creation of an Alberta Pension Plan, and a reworking of the controversial changes the PC government made to the oil and gas royalty regime.

An anticipated backlash against the governing PCs failed to materialize, as Premier Ed Stelmach extended his party's seat total to 72 from 60. While the Alliance finished second in eight ridings across the province, they failed to win any seats as Hinman lost his Cardston-Taber-Warner riding by just 39 votes. Running candidates in 61 of the province's 83 ridings, the Alliance took 6.8% of the vote, fourth behind the PCs, Liberals and New Democrats.

=== 2009 leadership election ===
Hinman announced on April 20, 2009, his intention to step down as leader. He remained the party's leader in an interim capacity until the leadership convention. Former Canadian Federation of Independent Business provincial director Danielle Smith and Mark Dyrholm, a chiropractor in Calgary, announced their candidacy at the June convention. The party viewed the leadership campaign with optimism, announcing that its membership was growing rapidly as Albertans grew increasingly frustrated with the Stelmach government's performance.

Growing opposition to the government's oil and gas royalty program, a record $4.7 billion deficit in 2009, and the PC's "liberal spending" facilitated the growth of the party. The party began to attract former Reform Party of Canada supporters along with high-profile former members of the provincial Progressive Conservatives, including former premier Ralph Klein's father. Using the slogan "Send Ed a message" as a rallying cry, Paul Hinman sought to take advantage of public discontent as he ran in a September by-election in the Calgary-Glenmore riding. He surprised political observers by capturing 37 percent of the vote, narrowly defeating Liberal opponent Avalon Roberts to win the election and gain the Wildrose Alliance its first seat in the legislature. The Tories, who had held the riding uninterrupted since 1969, fell to third place. Political observers argued the result was more a protest against the Stelmach government than firm support for the Alliance, though it gave the party momentum as it prepared to vote for a leader.

Every 30 or 40 years, we get tired of the government that's in power and we sweep them out and we look to a new alternative. I think we have an opportunity to catch one of those historic waves.

— Danielle Smith upon being named Wildrose Alliance leader

Smith and Dyrholm both attempted to capitalize on the party's election win, proclaiming that Albertans wanted change and that each of them would lead the Wildrose Alliance to a victory in the next general election. The party experienced a considerable growth heading into the leadership election, announcing it had 11,670 members at the beginning of October, compared to 1,800 in June. Smith was elected the new leader at the convention held in Edmonton on October 17.

=== Danielle Smith leadership ===
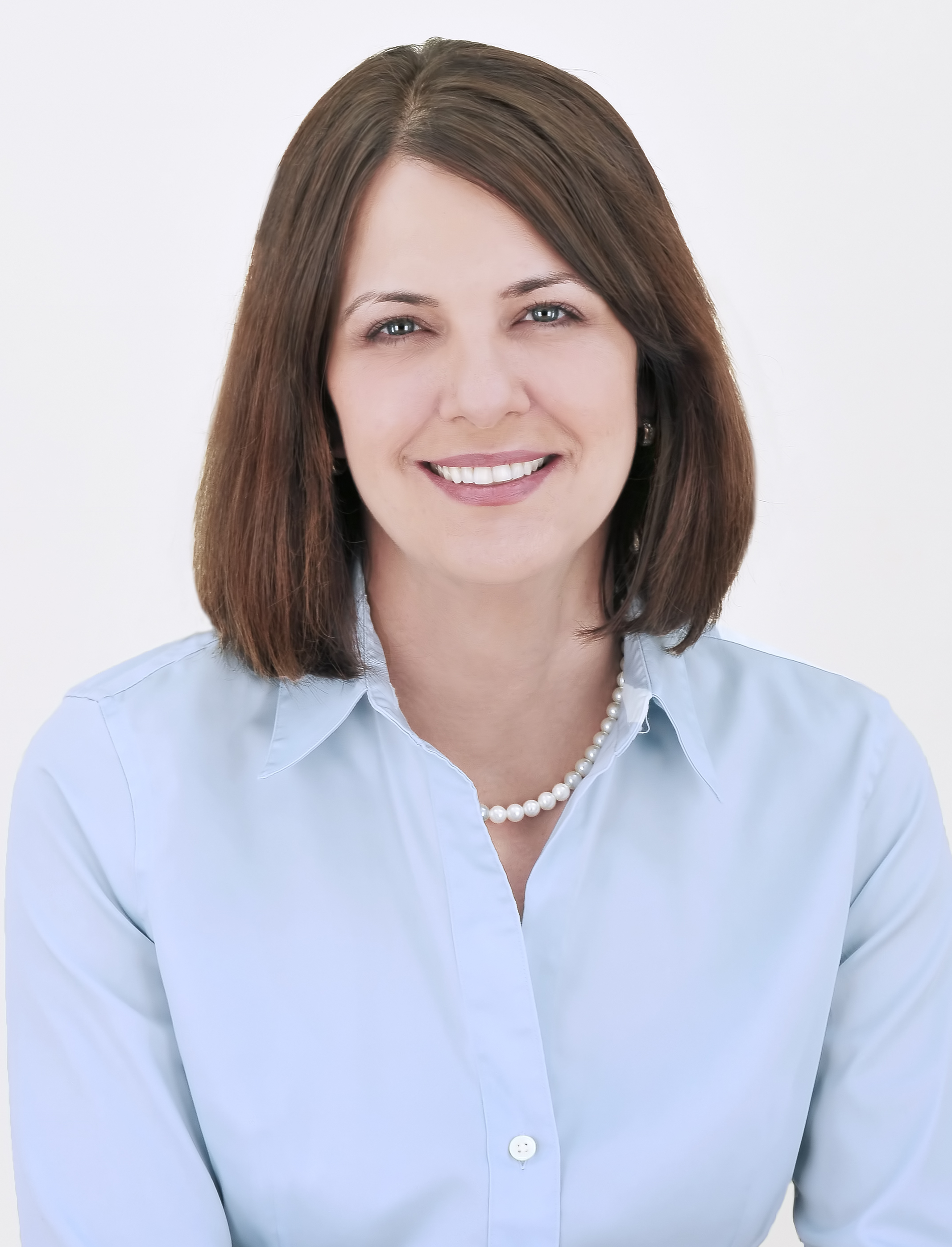
Danielle Smith

Wildrose Alliance logo 2010–2011

Upon her election, Smith sought to continue the party's growth, focusing her efforts on fundraising and a search for strong candidates. The Wildrose Alliance's growth was evident in the polls. Shortly before Smith's election, a Return on Insight poll found that the Alliance had the support of 22 percent of respondents. By early November, the party had improved to 28 percent according to an Environics poll, firmly in second place and six points behind the Conservatives. By December, they topped the Tories, leading with 39 percent support according to an Angus Reid poll, while the Conservatives had fallen into a second place tie with the Liberals at 25 percent. The party revealed at the same time that it had grown to over 13,000 members.

Amidst this wave of popularity, Smith announced on January 4, 2010, that two former Conservative MLAs had crossed the floor. Rob Anderson and former cabinet minister Heather Forsyth announced that they had joined the Wildrose Alliance after growing frustrated with Ed Stelmach's leadership, accusing the Conservative government of being undemocratic. The defections moved the Wildrose Party past the New Democrats to become the third largest party in the Legislature, Guy Boutilier joined the Wildrose Alliance on June 24, 2010. The fourth Wildrose MLA, Boutilier took the party over the threshold for recognition as an official party in the Assembly. He was unveiled at the party's annual conference, which was attended by 700 people: up from 175 the previous year.

In late July 2010, a controversy developed between Edmonton mayor Stephen Mandel and Smith over the future of the city-centre airport. Smith argued that a vote on closure of the airport should be added to the October civic elections ballot. Alberta Liberal and NDP politicians also opposed the closure.

For much of the run-up to the 2012 provincial election, it looked like the Wildrose would defeat the Tories in a landslide. Polling immediately before the election suggested that the gap had narrowed somewhat, but that the Wildrose was still poised to end the PCs' 44-year tenure in government. In the general election, however, the Wildrose took 17 seats out of 87, well behind the Tories. This was mainly because its support was confined to rural areas. The Wildrose only won two seats in Calgary (while losing the two seats it held there at dissolution) and were completely shut out of Edmonton. Nonetheless, it tallied 34.3 percent of the popular vote, a healthy increase from 2008. This was, however, enough to make the Wildrose the Official Opposition for the first time.

In 2014, Allison Redford stepped down as PC leader following numerous scandals, and polls began to show a resurgence in Wildrose support. Jim Prentice then won the PC leadership and called four by-elections to get his new cabinet, which included former Edmonton Mayor Stephen Mandel, seats in the Legislature. The Wildrose was expected to win two out of the four seats; however the PCs retained all four. The by-elections were seen as a test of both the PC Party under its new leader and Wildrose. As a result of the by-election losses, Smith asked the party to conduct a leadership review. On November 2, 2014, after Rimbey-Rocky Mountain House-Sundre MLA Joe Anglin left the Wildrose caucus to sit as an independent due to the party's "turmoil" and after making criticisms of Smith's leadership team internally., the remaining members of caucus unanimously pass a resolution asking Smith to withdraw her request for a leadership review; Smith agreed. At the party's Annual General Meeting on November 15, 2014, Smith pledged to resign as Wildrose leader if the party did not win government in the next provincial election. Also at the AGM, members voted 148–109 against a resolution supporting equal rights for all minority groups, regardless of race, religious belief, sexual orientation or other differences. This vote reversed a party policy supported by Smith which had been adopted the previous year and signified a shift by the party towards social conservatism resulting in resignations by more moderate party members.

==== Defections ====
On November 3, 2014, Joe Anglin (Rimbey-Rocky Mountain House-Sundre) quit the caucus to sit as an Independent MLA stating that he had found out he was out to be expelled due to his public criticisms of Smith's advisers. Anglin had previously lost his bid to be renominated in his riding as Wildrose's candidate for the next provincial election.

On November 24, 2014 Kerry Towle, (Innisfail-Sylvan Lake), and Ian Donovan, (Little Bow) crossed the floor to join the ruling PC Party's caucus giving the turmoil within the Wildrose Party, uncertainty about Smith's leadership and confidence in Prentice as reasons for their move.

On December 17, 2014, Smith confirmed she and eight other Wildrose members – Rob Anderson, Gary Bikman, Rod Fox, Jason Hale, Bruce McAllister, Blake Pedersen, Bruce Rowe and Jeff Wilson – would cross the floor to the Progressive Conservative caucus, with Smith saying "Under Premier Prentice's strong leadership, I believe we can work together to lead Alberta with a renewed focus on the values and principles that we share." The action followed several days of rumours and a PC caucus meeting in which that party agreed to accept the Wildrose members. Smith said that several conversations with Prentice revealed that they shared much common ground, particularly on fiscal issues. Ultimately, she concluded that it made little sense for her to continue in opposition. "If you're going to be the official Opposition leader," she said, "you have to really want to take down the government and really take down the premier. I don't want to take down this premier. I want this premier to succeed."

This reduced the Wildrose caucus to five members. In her formal resignation letter to the Wildrose executive, Smith asked that all party members vote on a "reunification resolution" to merge the Wildrose and PC parties; a request which the party executive rejected. This development angered many party members and provoked widespread controversy. Wildrose has stated that "At no time has the Wildrose Party been approached by any representative of the PCAA regarding a merger, combination, partnership or alliance. Yesterday's events are confined to nine former Wildrose MLAs who opted to cross the floor without consulting the Wildrose Party."

The defections placed Wildrose in a tie with the Liberals for the second most seats but the Speaker ruled that Wildrose would continue as the Official Opposition based on prior precedent. Official Opposition status comes with additional funding and privileges. In the wake of the mass floor crossing, new leader Brian Jean stated that each candidate must sign a contract, under which they would need to pay a $100,000 fine if they intend to cross the floor to another party.

=== 2015 election ===
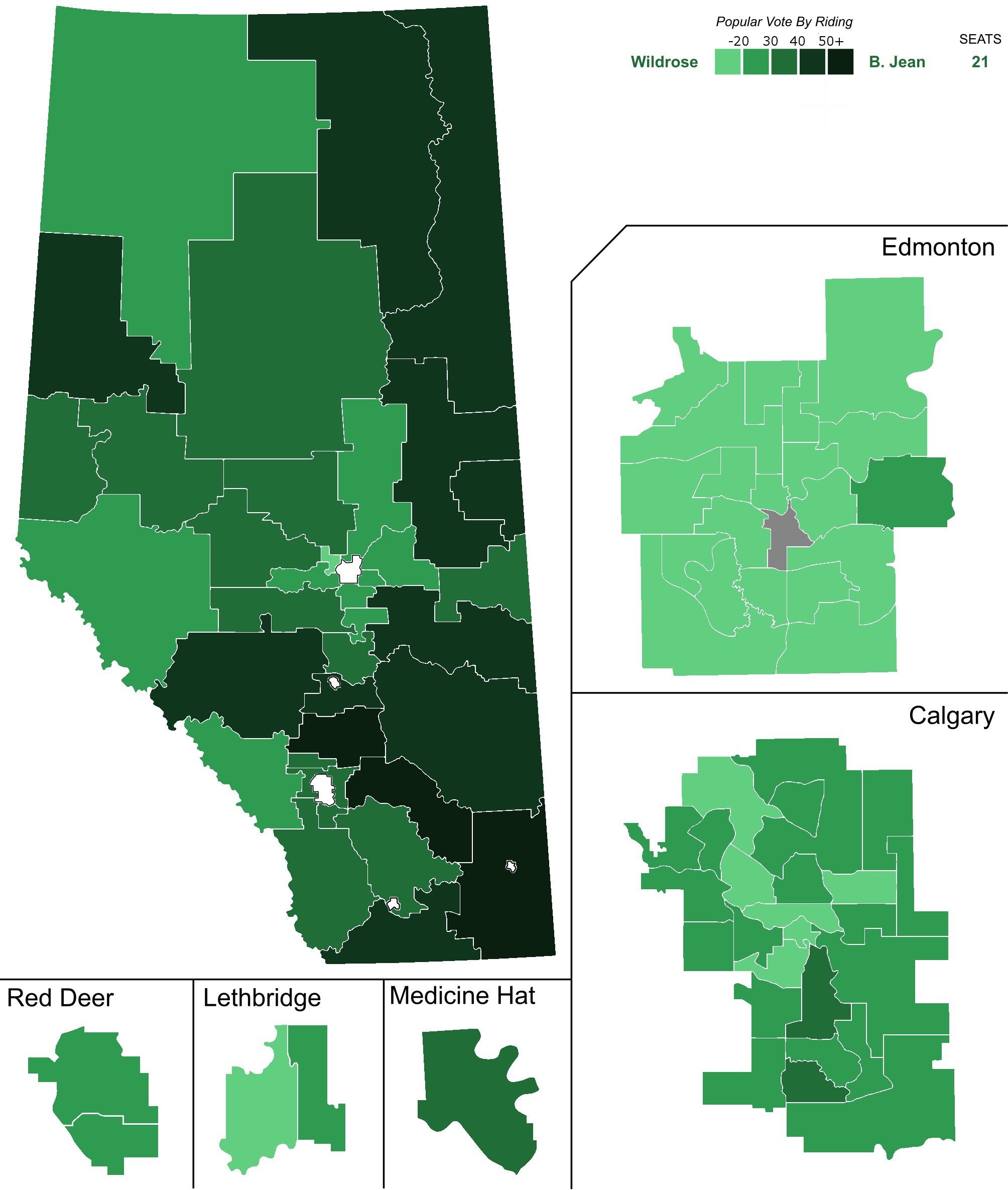
Wildrose results by riding, 2015

Former federal MP Brian Jean was elected Wildrose leader on March 28, 2015. Days later, Premier Jim Prentice called a provincial election for May 5, 2015 which resulted in an upset victory by the Alberta New Democratic Party under Rachel Notley, returning an NDP majority government. Despite its lack of preparedness, due to the caucus defections and having to organize an election campaign on the heels of a leadership election, Wildrose was able to rally and win 21 seats, 16 more than the five seats it had at the dissolution of the legislature, and four more than it had won in 2012, allowing the party to remain the Official Opposition. Prentice's Progressive Conservatives, however, collapsed and lost 60 of the 70 seats it had at dissolution, returning only 10 MLAs, finding itself out of power for the first time since 1971 and coming in third behind the NDP and Wildrose. Wildrose's popular vote fell by one-third, however, from 34% of the vote in 2012 to 24% in 2015.

=== Merger with Progressive Conservatives ===
Former federal Conservative cabinet minister Jason Kenney became Progressive Conservative leader after winning that party's leadership election in early 2017. Kenney's platform called for uniting the Progressive Conservative and Wildrose parties to form a united right-of-centre alliance. On March 20, 2017, Jean met with Kenney to begin unity discussions.

On May 18, 2017, Jean and Kenney announced that their two parties had come to a merger agreement pending the outcome of votes to be held by the membership of both parties on July 22, 2017. The merger proposal required the approval of 50%+1 of Progressive Conservative members and 75% of Wildrose members in order to be ratified.

Of the 42,617 Wildrose members eligible to vote on July 22, 2017, there was a 57 per cent turnout with 23,466 voters (95%) in favour of the agreement and 1,132 (5%) against, clearing the 75% threshold required by the party's constitution. The Progressive Conservative membership also approved the agreement by a margin of 95% to 5%. With a turnout of 55% of eligible members, 25,692 PC members voted yes and 1,344 voted no with 24 spoiled ballots; the party's constitution required a simple majority of its membership to approve the merger.

The parties then began the process of merging into the United Conservative Party, with a leadership election to occur on October 28, 2017, and a founding convention to be held in 2018. The UCP formally came into existence on July 24, with former Wildrose MLA Nathan Cooper as interim leader.

=== Current legal status and official dissolution ===
Because Alberta electoral law did not permit parties to formally merge (or even to transfer money among themselves), the PC and Wildrose parties did not formally dissolve upon creation of the new UCP. As a result, when the UCP came into existence on July 24, 2017; the UCP's interim leadership team formally assumed the leaderships of the PC and Wildrose parties as well. In that role, they withdrew both organizations from any meaningful public presence, thus effectively dissolving them although they continued to exist on paper. In order to give de facto effect to the merger, all Wildrose members in good standing as of July 24 became members of the UCP from that date, and all but a few Wildrose members formally withdrew their memberships in the Wildrose. Legally, the core leadership team of the UCP remained members of both the PC and Wildrose parties.

To maintain their registration through the 2019 Alberta general election, both the PCs and Wildrose ran one paper candidate each in that election. Both of these nominal candidates appeared on the ballot in Edmonton-Strathcona, the district held by incumbent Premier Notley and considered among the NDP's safest seats.

The newly elected UCP government passed legislation allowing parties to merge during the Fall 2019 legislative session. On February 7, 2020, the merger was formally approved by Elections Alberta, allowing the party to officially merge with the PCs and dissolve.

== Policy and identity ==
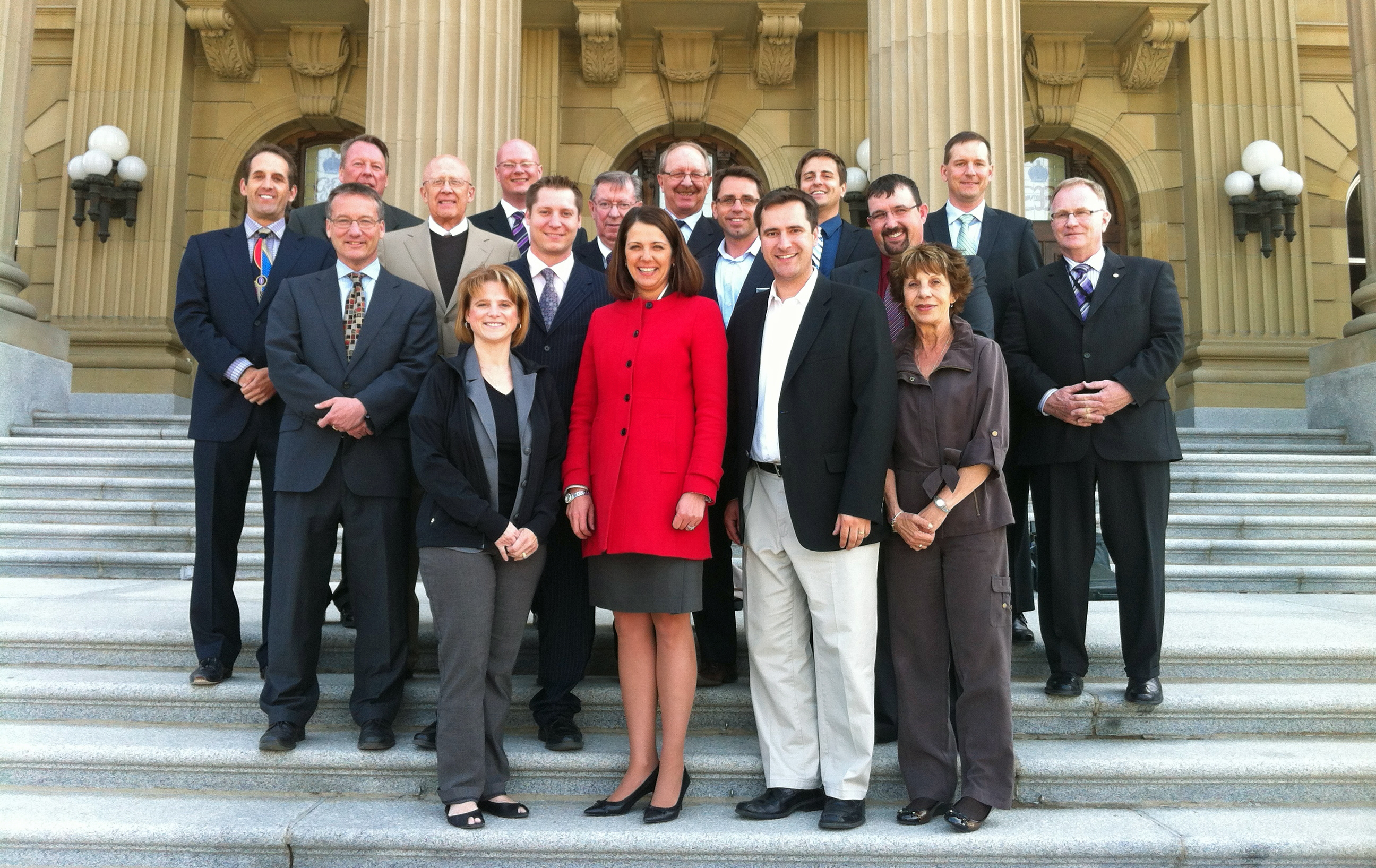
Danielle Smith and the Wildrose Official Opposition Caucus, 2012

Election reform was a focus of the Wildrose Alliance. The party proposed to set fixed election dates rather than the current format which allows the Premier to call an election at any time. It would allow more free votes in the legislature and would seek to elect the province's Senators rather than have them appointed by the Prime Minister. The party also planned to introduce a bill giving voters the right to recall their MLA. The Wildrose Party proposed numerous changes to how the province delivers health care, which it claimed will remain compliant with the Canada Health Act, as well as controls on government spending. Smith was also critical of international climate change treaties, believing climate change science remains inconclusive.

Smith stated that controversial social issues would not play a part in the party's election platform. In 2014, a Wildrose insider told Calgary Herald editorial page editor Licia Corbella that Smith had grown increasingly uncomfortable leading a party with a strong tinge of social conservatism.

== Leaders ==
=== Alberta Alliance leaders ===
- Randy Thorsteinson, 2003–2005
- Eleanor Maroes, 2005 (interim)
- Paul Hinman, 2005–2008

=== Wildrose leaders ===
- Paul Hinman, 2008–2009
- Danielle Smith, 2009–2014
- Heather Forsyth, 2014–2015 (interim)
- Brian Jean, 2015–2017

== Members of the Legislative Assembly ==
Permanent party leaders in bold. The entire caucus crossed the floor to the United Conservative Party in 2017.

MLA	Years	District	Notes
Leela Aheer	2015–2017	Chestermere-Rocky View	
Rob Anderson	2010–2014	Airdrie	Crossed floor from PCs. Crossed floor back to PCs.
Wayne Anderson	2015–2017	Highwood	
Joe Anglin	2012–2014	Rimbey-Rocky Mountain House-Sundre	Crossed floor to sit as an independent. Former leader of the Alberta Greens.
Drew Barnes	2012–2017	Cypress-Medicine Hat	
Gary Bikman	2012–2014	Cardston-Taber-Warner	Crossed floor to PCs.
Guy Boutilier	2010–2012	Fort McMurray-Wood Buffalo	Crossed floor after sitting as independent. Former PC cabinet member.
Nathan Cooper	2015–2017	Olds-Didsbury-Three Hills	
Scott Cyr	2015–2017	Bonnyville-Cold Lake	
Ian Donovan	2012–2014	Little Bow	Crossed floor to PCs.
**Brian Jean**	2015–2017	Fort McMurray-Conklin	Party leader 2015–2017.
Derek Fildebrandt	2015–2017	Strathmore-Brooks	Briefly suspended from caucus in 2016.
Heather Forsyth	2010–2015	Calgary-Fish Creek	Crossed floor from PCs. Former PC cabinet member. Interim party leader 2014–2015.
Rod Fox	2012–2014	Lacombe-Ponoka	Crossed floor to PCs.
Jason Hale	2012–2014	Strathmore-Brooks	Crossed floor to PCs.
Dave Hanson	2015–2017	Lac La Biche-St. Paul-Two Hills	
**Paul Hinman**	2004–2008	Cardston-Taber-Warner	First elected Alberta Alliance MLA. Party leader 2005–2009. Elected in a by-election in 2009.
**Paul Hinman**	2009–2012	Calgary-Glenmore	First elected Alberta Alliance MLA. Party leader 2005–2009. Elected in a by-election in 2009.
Grant Hunter	2015–2017	Cardston-Taber-Warner	
Todd Loewen	2015–2017	Grande Prairie-Smoky	
Don MacIntyre	2015–2017	Innisfail-Sylvan Lake	
Gary Masyk	2004	Edmonton-Norwood	Crossed floor from PCs to become the first Alberta Alliance MLA.
Bruce McAllister	2012–2014	Chestermere-Rocky View	Crossed floor to PCs.
Jason Nixon	2015–2017	Rimbey-Rocky Mountain House-Sundre	
Ron Orr	2015–2017	Lacombe-Ponoka	
Prasad Panda	2015–2017	Calgary-Foothills	Elected in a by-election after Jim Prentice disclaimed his seat.
Blake Pedersen	2012–2014	Medicine Hat	Crossed floor to PCs.
Angela Pitt	2015–2017	Airdrie	
Bruce Rowe	2012–2014	Olds-Didsbury-Three Hills	Crossed floor to PCs.
Shayne Saskiw	2012–2015	Lac La Biche-St. Paul-Two Hills	
Dave Schneider	2015–2017	Little Bow	
**Danielle Smith**	2012–2014	Highwood	Party leader 2009–2014. Crossed floor to PCs.
Mark Smith	2015–2017	Drayton Valley-Devon	
Pat Stier	2012–2017	Livingstone-Macleod	
Rick Strankman	2012–2017	Drumheller-Stettler	
Wes Taylor	2015–2017	Battle River-Wainwright	
Kerry Towle	2012–2014	Innisfail-Sylvan Lake	Crossed floor to PCs.
Glenn van Dijken	2015–2017	Barrhead-Morinville-Westlock	
Jeff Wilson	2012–2014	Calgary-Shaw	Crossed floor to PCs.
Tany Yao	2015–2017	Fort McMurray-Wood Buffalo	

== Electoral results ==
Election	Banner	Leader	Candidates	Votes	%	Seats	±	Position	Government
2004	Alberta Alliance	Randy Thorsteinson	83 / 83	77,506	8.7	1 / 83	▲1	▲4th	No status
2008	Wildrose Alliance	Paul Hinman	61 / 83	64,407	6.8	0 / 83	▼1	4th	—N/a
2012	Wildrose	Danielle Smith	87 / 87	442,429	34.3	17 / 87	▲17	▲2nd	Opposition
2015	Wildrose	Brian Jean	86 / 87	360,101	24.2	21 / 87	▲4	2nd	Opposition
2019 (Note: Although the party was merged into the United Conservative Party, it along with Albertan Progressive Conservatives weren't fully and legally dissolved, under provincial law until 2020 and were required to run at least one candidate to avoid having the party's assets revert to the province.)	Wildrose	Jason Kenney	1 / 87	57	nil	0 / 87	▼21	▼14th	No seats

Alberta Senate nominee elections
Election	Banner	Votes	%	Elected
2004	Alberta Alliance	500,284	23.0	0 / 3
2012	Wildrose	847,470	31.5	0 / 3

=== Polling ===
According to polls in 2010, the party had the support of a quarter of the electorate as the party further attempted to define itself as not just a protest party but a party capable of forming government. By July 2011, the Wildrose's support had fallen to 16 percent, while PC support had risen to 51 percent. Conversely, one March 2012 poll reported that Wildrose had the support of four-in-ten Albertans, a much stronger result than other polls.

== See also ==
- Wildrose Party candidates, 2012 Alberta provincial election
