= List of premiers of Alberta =

There have been 19 heads of government of the Canadian province of Alberta since it was created in 1905. Three were Liberal, three belonged to the United Farmers of Alberta, three were Social Credit, seven were Progressive Conservatives, two have belonged to the United Conservatives and one was New Democratic. The current premier of Alberta is Danielle Smith of the United Conservative Party.

Alberta uses a unicameral Westminster-style parliamentary government, in which the premier is the leader of the party that controls the most seats in the Legislative Assembly. The premier is Alberta's head of government, while the King of Canada is its head of state and is represented by the lieutenant governor of Alberta. The premier picks a cabinet, usually from the elected members of the Legislative Assembly, to form the Executive Council of Alberta, and presides over that body.

Members are elected to the legislature during general elections or by-elections. Barring special legislation occasioned by a war or an emergency (which has never happened in Alberta's history, although it has federally), general elections must be called by the lieutenant governor, at the premier's advice, no later than five years after the previous election, but the premier may ask (and almost always has asked) for dissolution of the legislative assembly and a subsequent election earlier than that. Under Alberta's fixed-election legislation of 2024, a general election is to be held on the third Monday in October in the fourth calendar year following the most recent general election, but the premier can bindingly advise the lieutenant governor to call an election earlier than the fixed date.

An election may also happen if the governing party loses the confidence of the legislature, by the defeat of a supply bill or tabling of a confidence motion, but in Alberta's history of massive majorities in the assembly, this has never happened. William Aberhart's first mandate as premier was almost cut short, when a large part of his caucus showed willingness to vote against his government's budget; but when he promised to bring in radical banking reform they were satisfied.

A leader of a party is chosen by the party, following an internal constitution unique to each party that comprises a framework to elect or appoint a leader. Leaders, not already possessing a seat, must then win a seat in a by-election or general election to sit in the Assembly. Leaders of a party without a seat must sit in the legislature gallery. While sitting in the gallery a premier cannot exercise any legislative powers.

Prior to 1905, Alberta was part of the North-West Territories and as part of this jurisdiction was governed by the North-West Legislative Council, composed of elected and appointed officials, led by lieutenant governors of the North-West Territories until 1897, and by lieutenant governors of the Northwest Territories and the premier of the North-West Territories from 1897 to 1905.

Since 1905 Alberta's premiers have belonged to six different political parties. However, there have been only five changes of government, as governments once elected are usually in for long periods and have always been majority governments. No defeated party has yet returned to power. As of 2024, three women have served as Premier of Alberta, more than any other province.

== History ==
=== Liberal Party (1905–1921) ===
The Liberal party got its start in power in Alberta when Prime Minister Wilfrid Laurier appointed Alexander Rutherford, a prominent liberal and former elected NWT Assembly member, as interim premier in 1905. He and other Liberals organized the province's first election.

Rutherford's Liberal party was elected, with a majority of the popular vote and a majority of seats in the Legislative Assembly in the province's first election, the 1905 Alberta election. The north-central constituency boundaries radiated out from Edmonton and some say this was a case of gerrymandered electoral boundaries. Rutherford's government received a majority of votes in the election and emerged from the March 1909 election leading another formidable majority, which clearly reflected the broad popular support he and his government enjoyed. He would resign as premier 14 months later, in May 1910, after his government was implicated in the Alberta and Great Waterways Railway scandal.

Arthur Sifton replaced Rutherford as premier. Shortly before the 1913 election Sifton's Liberals jammed through a controversial bill greatly expanding the size of the legislative assembly. The bill was once again said to gerrymander boundaries in Liberals' favor, although the Liberals again received more votes than any other party in the 1913 election. The press and opposition would term his reign as premier "Siftonism" implying that his reign was a disease on Alberta. Sifton only lasted one mandate as premier as he left to pursue a career in federal politics.

Charles Stewart replaced Sifton and held the Liberal government through the lackluster 1917 election which 11 MLAs serving in the armed forces were automatically re-elected. The elected opposition was the strongest so far in the province's 12-year history. The Conservatives, which formed the official opposition with 19 seats, slightly more than one-third of the seats in the Assembly, expressed hopes they had the upper hand on the waning Liberal government. Both would be surprised by the United Farmers who routed the Liberals and Conservatives in rural areas to form the government in the 1921 election.

=== United Farmers (1921–1935) ===
Alberta's second dynasty was the United Farmers of Alberta, a farmers' movement organization, formed in 1909 as a lobby group, whose political wing rose from a minor party named the Alberta Non-Partisan League, formed in 1916. Henry Wise Wood led the party at the time of the 1921 election, although he did not run himself. The loosely organized farmer candidates running in rural constituencies captured a majority of the seats. The party was allied with Labour candidates, so it did not contest urban ridings, aside from one in Edmonton. Wood did not want the job as premier so the farmers were forced to shop around. UFA lawyer John Brownlee was asked first but declined. UFA executive member Herbert Greenfield, the second choice, became the new premier, although he too had not run in the election so had to await success in a by-election to take his seat. Greenfield resigned four years later because he was often absent due to illness and lost much of his energy due to the death of his wife shortly after the election.

John Brownlee, who had previously been offered the job, succeeded Greenfield. Brownlee's reign as government leader was troubled by the onset of the Great Depression. He resigned in scandal after he was accused of sexual acts with a minor in the Attorney General's office. This and another scandalous divorce by UFA MLA Oran McPherson, speaker of the Legislative Assembly, gave the United Farmers an image of moral decay. In 1934 Richard Reid replaced Brownlee but served as premier for less than two years, leading the United Farmers government into total defeat at the hands of the new Social Credit party.

=== Social Credit (1935–1971) ===
Albertans turned away from the United Farmers government and began to follow evangelical radio preacher William Aberhart, known as Bible Bill. The Social Credit party had been founded in 1932. Voters flocked to the radical monetary reforms proposed by Aberhart and British SC theorist Clifford Douglas, looking for an escape to the Great Depression. Social Credit was elected with a majority (54 percent of the vote) in the 1935 election completely wiping out the United Farmers representation (although the UFA did receive 11 percent of the vote). Aberhart had difficulty implementing the Social Credit theory and his popularity began to decline. His government almost fell during a 1936 caucus rebellion, in which his own MLAs forced him to promise to try to reform the banking system. But it rebounded and in the 1940 election it garnered more votes than any other party and also captured a large majority of the seats. Aberhart died in 1943; he is the only premier to die in office in Alberta's history.

Ernest Manning succeeded Aberhart as premier. Under Manning, Social Credit moved away from the monetary theory of Douglas and towards traditional conservatism. Manning led the party through seven-straight massive majorities, (although in 1955 his government received barely more seats than Aberhart had received in 1940, due to a strong but short-lived Liberal drive). During his premiership, his government abolished the hybrid STV/Instant-runoff voting system the province had been using since 1924, and the government received a windfall of seats in the 1959 election. After 24 years as premier, Manning resigned in 1967.

Harry Strom, a long time cabinet minister, replaced Manning and led the party to defeat in the 1971 election at the hands of the Progressive Conservatives under Peter Lougheed. Strom and his government looked old and tired and out of touch compared to the new Progressive Conservatives.

=== Progressive Conservative (1971–2015) ===
The fourth government of Alberta was first led by Peter Lougheed, defeating the 36-year reign of Social Credit in 1971.

Peter Lougheed served as premier, winning four elections, until 1985 when he retired from public office. Some of Lougheed's notable accomplishments were the limited Alberta Bill of Rights, and the Heritage Trust Fund.

Don Getty, one of Lougheed's long-time cabinet ministers, returned to politics to win the leadership of the party. Getty's premiership was endorsed by a win in the 1986 general election that saw the NDP climb to 16 seats as the official opposition. Getty's reign became very unpopular as he led Alberta into large deficit spending, and marked an era of big government that, some said, the province could not afford. In the 1989 election he was defeated in his Edmonton-Whitemud riding, while his party still won a majority. He sat in the gallery as premier, until he won a seat in a by-election in Stettler. His refusal to leave as premier helped Laurence Decore's Liberals skyrocket in popularity. Getty resigned and was replaced in a bitter leadership battle by Ralph Klein.

Ralph Klein, the former mayor of Calgary, led the party into the 1993 election, promising a new era of debt reduction and fiscal accountability. He walked away with a slim majority. Ralph Klein's folksy appeal helped the Progressive Conservatives renew themselves. He led the party through two elections, gaining in popularity each time. The price of oil rebounded and the government, despite low rates of taxes on the wealthy and corporations, was showing a surplus of $3 billion every year. In early 2004, Klein announced that the Alberta debt had been paid in full. He was rewarded by voters in the 2004 election, despite running a campaign with no new policies. His party lost a number of seats to the Liberals, and during the campaign he stated this would be his last election. In 2006 at a Progressive Conservative convention delegates forced him to pick a retirement date by giving him relatively low numbers in a leadership review.

Ed Stelmach succeeded Klein as premier, following his win of the leadership of the Alberta Progressive Conservative party in 2006. He won the 2008 provincial election, but, troubled by dissension within his party as well as lagging in polls behind the upstart Wildrose Party, resigned as the party celebrated its 40 years in power in 2011.

Alison Redford subsequently was elected party leader and became the first female premier of Alberta. Despite strong opposition from the Wildrose Party that most polls and media predicted would end the PC's 41-year dynasty, Redford and the PC party won re-election in April 2012, making Redford Alberta's first elected female premier. Due to a steep decline in approval ratings and a spending controversy, Alison Redford announced her resignation on March 19, 2014, as premier of Alberta, effective March 23.

Alberta Deputy Premier Dave Hancock was selected as premier and interim party leader by the Progressive Conservative caucus on March 20, 2014, and became premier on March 23, 2014.

Jim Prentice was elected as the permanent leader of the PC Party on September 6, 2014, and succeeded Hancock as premier on September 15, 2014. He turned the government around on a number of crucial issues, cancelling the closure of the Michener Centre, for example. He was elected to the constituency of Calgary-Foothill in an October 27, 2014 by-election, as the PC Party won the four by-elections held that day while the rival Wildrose Party did very poorly. Less than two months later, most of the Wildrose Party caucus—including leader Danielle Smith, crossed the floor to sit with the PC Party. However, Prentice government's popularity dropped sharply by spring 2015, due to a budget that was unpopular among the political spectrum, with the collapse in PC support also attributed to falling oil prices and the past scandals under the Redford government. Prentice had over a year before he was obliged to dissolve the legislature, nonetheless he decided to call a snap election. On May 5, 2015, the PC Party's 44 straight years of government ended as they lost 60 seats in the Legislature to fall to third place in the legislature, while the NDP won a majority government over the resurgent Wildrose Party which finished second and become the Official Opposition. Prentice resigned as party leader and as an MLA, leaving the PC Party with only 9 seats.

=== New Democratic Party (2015–2019) ===
On May 5, 2015, Rachel Notley successfully led the New Democratic party to a majority government in the 2015 Alberta general election, defeating the incumbent government led by Jim Prentice of the Progressive Conservative Party, with 54 seats and 41% of the popular vote and securing only the fourth change of government in Alberta's political history.

Rachel Notley was appointed and sworn in as premier on May 24, 2015, following her party's capturing of 54 out of 87 seats in the Legislature. The NDP's surprise victory was attributed to the unpopularity of the Prentice government's budget, a strong performance by Notley in the leaders' debates, and splitting of the right-wing vote between the PC and Wildrose parties. On May 22, 2015, Notley suspended a caucus member, leaving her party with 53 out of 87 seats, which did not change the balance of power in the legislature. The NDP held 52 seats at the time of the legislature's dissolution in March 2019, and were defeated in the ensuing general election on April 16, 2019, making it the first one-mandate government in provincial history.

=== United Conservative Party (since 2019) ===
On April 16, 2019, Jason Kenney successfully led the United Conservative Party to a majority government in the 2019 Alberta general election, defeating the incumbent government led by Rachel Notley of the New Democratic Party with 63 seats and 54.88% of the popular vote and securing only the fifth change of government in Alberta's political history. Kenney, a former federal cabinet minister, had entered provincial politics to become PC Party leader where he led its merger with Wildrose, and then won the leadership of the newly combined party, the UCP. As of 2022 Danielle Smith took office after Jason Kenney resigned for not enough support in his party.

== List of premiers ==
No.	Portrait	Name (Birth–Death)	Term of office	Electoral mandates (Assembly)	Political party	Parliamentary seat	Cabinet	Ref.
Premiers of the North-West Territories
1		Frederick W. A. G. Haultain (1857–1942)	7 October 1897 – 1 September 1905	Title created (3rd NW Leg.) 1898 election (4th NW Leg.) 1902 election (5th NW Leg.)	Liberal–Conservative (Ldr. 1897)	MLA for Macleod		
1		Frederick W. A. G. Haultain (1857–1942)	Led negotiations for provincial status for Alberta and Saskatchewan.					
Premiers of Alberta
1		Alexander Cameron Rutherford (1857–1941)	2 September 1905 – 26 May 1910	Title created (caretaker government) 1905 election (1st Leg.) 1909 election (2nd Leg.)	Liberal (Ldr. 1905)	MLA for Strathcona	Rutherford Ministry	
1		Alexander Cameron Rutherford (1857–1941)	Organization of administration for new province; incorporation of City of Lethbridge, Medicine Hat, Strathcona and Wetaskiwin; establishment of court system; establishment of University of Alberta and of school system; creation of Alberta Government Telephones, extension of railway network in the province, labour laws, such as eight-hour-day legislation					
2		Arthur Sifton (1858–1921)	26 May 1910 – 30 October 1917	Appointment (2nd Leg.) 1913 election (3rd Leg.) 1917 election (4th Leg.)	Liberal (Ldr. 1910)	MLA for Vermilion	Sifton Ministry	
2		Arthur Sifton (1858–1921)	Instituting prohibition; establishment of agricultural colleges, extension of votes to women (white British/Canadian citizens).					
3		Charles Stewart (1868–1946)	30 October 1917 – 13 August 1921	Appointment (4th Leg.)	Liberal (Ldr. 1917)	MLA for Sedgewick	Stewart Ministry	
3		Charles Stewart (1868–1946)	Attempted to establish fairer representation through Single Transferable (STV) balloting in the rural areas.					
4		Herbert Greenfield (1869–1949)	13 August 1921 – 23 November 1925	1921 election (5th Leg.)	United Farmers (Ldr. 1921)	MLA for Peace River	Greenfield Ministry	(Note: The United Farmers of Alberta won the 1921 election without a party leader, but Greenfield was made Premier immediately after it.)
4		Herbert Greenfield (1869–1949)	Creation of Alberta Wheat Pool; repeal of Prohibition and creation of government-owned liquor stores, creation of proportional representation in the cities through Single Transferable Balloting (the Hare system), attempted to impose taxation on land owned by speculators standing idle, and on mineral resources, both over-ruled by the courts.					
5		John Edward Brownlee (1883–1961)	23 November 1925 – 10 July 1934	Appointment (5th Leg.) 1926 election (6th Leg.) 1930 election (7th Leg.)	United Farmers (Ldr. 1925)	MLA for Ponoka	Brownlee Ministry	
5		John Edward Brownlee (1883–1961)	Sexual Sterilization Act; elimination of Alberta Provincial Police; creation of provincial income tax (April, 1932), legislation to control foreclosing on working (but un-profitable) farms					
6		Richard Gavin Reid (1879–1980)	10 July 1934 – 3 September 1935	Appointment (7th Leg.)	United Farmers (Ldr. 1934)	MLA for Vermilion	Reid Ministry	
6		Richard Gavin Reid (1879–1980)	Government purchase of cattle from farmers who could no longer afford feed; cost-sharing agreement with federal government and railways to relocate farmers fleeing the Dust Belt.					
7		William Aberhart (1878–1943)	3 September 1935 – 23 May 1943	1935 election (8th Leg.) 1940 election (9th Leg.)	Social Credit (Ldr. 1935)	MLA for Okotoks-High River (1935-1940) MLA for Calgary (1940-1943)	Aberhart Ministry	
7		William Aberhart (1878–1943)	Attempts to implement social credit economic theory; issuance of prosperity certificates; public works and debt relief programs to aid victims of the Depression; creation of Alberta Treasury Branches financial services institution, consolidated school districts into school divisions, imposed regulation on the oil and gas fields outside Calgary to prevent wastage of natural gas.					
8		Ernest Manning (1908–1996)	31 May 1943 – 12 December 1968	Appointment (9th Leg.) 1944 election (10th Leg.) 1948 election (11th Leg.) 1952 election (12th Leg.) 1955 election (13th Leg.) 1959 election (14th Leg.) 1963 election (15th Leg.) 1967 election (16th Leg.)	Social Credit (Ldr. 1943)	MLA for Edmonton (1943-1959) MLA for Strathcona East (1959-1968)	Manning Ministry	(Note: Because Aberhart died unexpectedly, the Social Credit Caucus did not choose a leader for a full week. Manning was appointed Premier by Lieutenant-Governor John C. Bowen the same day.)
8		Ernest Manning (1908–1996)	Abandonment of social credit economic theory; exploitation of Leduc oil fields; expansion of educational, health and transportation facilities.					
9		Harry Strom (1914–1984)	12 December 1968 – 10 September 1971	Appointment (16th Leg.)	Social Credit (Ldr. 1968)	MLA for Cypress	Strom Ministry	
9		Harry Strom (1914–1984)	Alberta Service Corps; introduction of kindergarten; creation of Athabasca University and Grant MacEwan College.					
10		Peter Lougheed (1928–2012)	10 September 1971 – 1 November 1985	1971 election (17th Leg.) 1975 election (18th Leg.) 1979 election (19th Leg.) 1982 election (20th Leg.)	Progressive Conservative (Ldr. 1965)	MLA for Calgary-West	Lougheed Ministry	
10		Peter Lougheed (1928–2012)	Creation of Alberta Heritage Savings Trust Fund; Syncrude; 1981 Energy Pricing Agreement with Ottawa; provincial control of natural resources.					
11		Don Getty (1933–2016)	1 November 1985 – 14 December 1992	Appointment (20th Leg.) 1986 election (21st Leg.) 1989 election (22nd Leg.)	Progressive Conservative (Ldr. 1985)	MLA for Edmonton-Whitemud (1985-1989) MLA for Stettler (1989-1992)	Getty Ministry	
11		Don Getty (1933–2016)	Senate elections; attempts to settle land settlement dispute with Lubicon Cree leading to the Grimshaw Accord with Chief Bernard Ominayak and negotiations for the betterment of Metis; creation of Family Day.					
12		Ralph Klein (1942–2013)	14 December 1992 – 14 December 2006	Appointment (22nd Leg.) 1993 election (23rd Leg.) 1997 election (24th Leg.) 2001 election (25th Leg.) 2004 election (26th Leg.)	Progressive Conservative (Ldr. 1992)	MLA for Calgary-Elbow	Klein Ministry	
12		Ralph Klein (1942–2013)	Privatization of Alberta Government Telephones; opposition to Kyoto Protocol; elimination of public debt through cuts to public sector and infrastructure; introduction of a flat tax on personal income; deregulation of electricity and natural gas industries; expansion of the oil and gas industry.					
13		Ed Stelmach (b. 1951)	14 December 2006 – 7 October 2011	Appointment (26th Leg.) 2008 election (27th Leg.)	Progressive Conservative (Ldr. 2006)	MLA for Fort Saskatchewan-Vegreville	Stelmach Ministry	
13		Ed Stelmach (b. 1951)	20% increase on royalties charged to oil companies; further development of Athabasca oil sands; removal of health care premiums.					
14		Alison Redford (b. 1965)	7 October 2011 – 23 March 2014	Appointment (27th Leg.) 2012 election (28th Leg.)	Progressive Conservative (Ldr. 2011)	MLA for Calgary-Elbow	Redford Ministry	
14		Alison Redford (b. 1965)	Fixed election period; creation of Department of Human Services.					
15		Dave Hancock (b. 1955)	23 March 2014 – 15 September 2014	Appointment (28th Leg.)	Progressive Conservative (Ldr. 2014 (interim))	MLA for Edmonton-Whitemud	Hancock Ministry	
15		Dave Hancock (b. 1955)	Interim leader during leadership election.					
16		Jim Prentice (1956–2016)	15 September 2014 – 24 May 2015	Appointment (28th Leg.)	Progressive Conservative (Ldr. 2014)	MLA for Calgary-Foothills	Prentice Ministry	
16		Jim Prentice (1956–2016)	Proposed austerity measures to counter budget shortfall during a provincial recession.					
17		Rachel Notley (b. 1964)	24 May 2015 – 30 April 2019	2015 election (29th Leg.)	New Democratic (Ldr. 2014)	MLA for Edmonton-Strathcona	Notley Ministry	
17		Rachel Notley (b. 1964)	Reintroduction of a progressive tax on personal income; banning of corporate and union donations to political parties; increases to minimum wage, new carbon tax and Climate Leadership Plan.					
18		Jason Kenney (b. 1968)	30 April 2019 – 11 October 2022	2019 election (30th Leg.)	United Conservative (Ldr. 2017)	MLA for Calgary-Lougheed	Kenney Ministry	
18		Jason Kenney (b. 1968)	Carbon Tax Repeal Act.					
19		Danielle Smith (b. 1971)	11 October 2022 – incumbent	Appointment (30th Leg.) 2023 election (31st Leg.)	United Conservative (Ldr. 2022)	MLA for Brooks-Medicine Hat (since November 2022)	Smith Ministry	
19		Danielle Smith (b. 1971)	Alberta Sovereignty Within a United Canada Act. 2026 separatist ballot question.					

== List of premiers by time in office ==
Rank	Name	Incumbency	Terms of office (Note: There was no premier of Alberta from May 23 until May 31, 1943, due to the death of Premier Aberhart.)		Mandates	Party
1	Ernest Manning	25 years, 195 days	May 31, 1943	December 12, 1968	7	█ Social Credit
2	Peter Lougheed	14 years, 52 days	September 10, 1971	November 1, 1985	4	█ Progressive Conservative
3	Ralph Klein	14 years, 0 days	December 14, 1992	December 14, 2006	4	█ Progressive Conservative
4	John Edward Brownlee	8 years, 229 days	November 23, 1925	July 10, 1934	2	█ United Farmers
5	William Aberhart	7 years, 262 days	September 3, 1935	May 23, 1943	2	█ Social Credit
6	Arthur Sifton	7 years, 157 days	May 26, 1910	October 30, 1917	2	█ Liberal
7	Don Getty	7 years, 42 days	November 1, 1985	December 13, 1992	2	█ Progressive Conservative
8	Ed Stelmach	4 years, 297 days	December 14, 2006	October 7, 2011	1	█ Progressive Conservative
9	Alexander Cameron Rutherford	4 years, 266 days	September 2, 1905	May 26, 1910	2	█ Liberal
10	Herbert Greenfield	4 years, 102 days	August 13, 1921	November 23, 1925	1 (Note: The United Farmers of Alberta won the 1921 election without a leader. Greenfield was made leader immediately afterward, and this election is counted as a win for Greenfield.)	█ United Farmers
11	Danielle Smith (incumbent)	4 years, 41 days	October 11, 2022	Present	1	█ United Conservative
12	Rachel Notley	3 years, 341 days	May 24, 2015	April 30, 2019	1	█ New Democratic
13	Charles Stewart	3 years, 287 days	October 30, 1917	August 13, 1921	0	█ Liberal
14	Jason Kenney	3 years, 164 days	April 30, 2019	October 11, 2022	1	█ United Conservative
15	Harry Strom	2 years, 272 days	December 12, 1968	September 10, 1971	0	█ Social Credit
16	Alison Redford	2 years, 167 days	October 7, 2011	March 23, 2014	1	█ Progressive Conservative
17	Richard Gavin Reid	1 year, 55 days	July 10, 1934	September 3, 1935	0	█ United Farmers
18	Jim Prentice	251 days	September 15, 2014	May 24, 2015	0	█ Progressive Conservative
19	Dave Hancock	176 days	March 23, 2014	September 15, 2014	0	█ Progressive Conservative

== See also ==
- Lists of office-holders
