= Deputy Premier of Alberta =

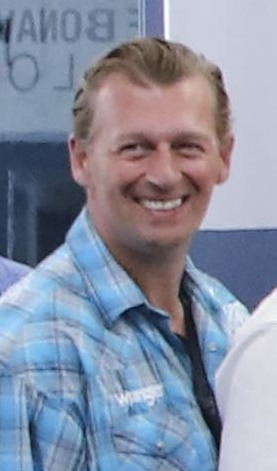
- Incumbent; Mike Ellis since June 9, 2023
- Status: Deputy head of government
- Member of: Cabinet; Legislative Assembly
- Reports to: Premier; Legislative Assembly
- Seat: Edmonton
- Nominator: Premier
- Appointer: Lieutenant governor
- Term length: At His Majesty's pleasure
- Formation: September 10, 1971
- First holder: Hugh Horner

The deputy premier of Alberta is the representative of the premier of Alberta in the Canadian province of Alberta when the current premier is unable to attend functions executed by the premier.

Mike Ellis has been the deputy premier since June 9, 2023.

== Deputy premiers of Alberta ==
No.	Name	Time in office		Party	Ministry	Ref.
1	Hugh Horner	September 10, 1971	September 24, 1979	█ Progressive Conservative	Lougheed	
2	David John Russell	February 6, 1986	April 13, 1989	█ Progressive Conservative	Getty	
3	Jim Horsman	April 14, 1989	December 14, 1992	█ Progressive Conservative	Getty	
4	Peter Elzinga	December 15, 1992	June 29, 1993	█ Progressive Conservative	Klein	
5	Ken Kowalski	December 15, 1992	October 21, 1994	█ Progressive Conservative	Klein	
6	Shirley McClellan	March 19, 2001	December 14, 2006	█ Progressive Conservative	Klein	
7	Ron Stevens	June 27, 2007	May 15, 2009	█ Progressive Conservative	Stelmach	
8	Doug Horner	January 15, 2010	February 4, 2011	█ Progressive Conservative	Stelmach	
(8)	Doug Horner	October 12, 2011	May 7, 2012	█ Progressive Conservative	Redford	
9	Thomas Lukaszuk	May 8, 2012	December 12, 2013	█ Progressive Conservative	Redford	
10	Dave Hancock	December 13, 2013	March 23, 2014	█ Progressive Conservative	Redford	
11	Sarah Hoffman	February 2, 2016	April 30, 2019	█ New Democratic	Notley	
12	Kaycee Madu	October 21, 2022	June 9, 2023	█ United Conservative	Smith	
13	Nathan Neudorf	October 21, 2022	June 9, 2023	█ United Conservative	Smith	
14	Mike Ellis	June 9, 2023	Incumbent	█ United Conservative	Smith	

== See also ==
- Deputy Premier (Canada)
