= 28th Alberta Legislature =

- Majority parliament
- May. 23, 2012 – Apr. 7, 2015

Parliament leaders
- Premier: Alison Redford; October 7, 2011 – March 23, 2014
- Dave Hancock; March 23, 2014 – September 15, 2014
- Jim Prentice; September 15, 2014 – May 24. 2015
- Cabinet: Redford cabinet Prentice cabinet
- Leader of the Opposition: Danielle Smith; April 24, 2012 – December 17, 2014
- Heather Forsyth; December 22, 2014 – June 1, 2015

Party caucuses
- Government: Progressive Conservative Association
- Opposition: Wildrose Party
- Recognized: Liberal Party
- New Democratic Party

Legislative Assembly
- Speaker of the Assembly: Gene Zwozdesky; May 23, 2012 – June 11, 2015
- Government House leader: Dave Hancock; March 12, 2008 – September 5, 2013
- Robin Campbell; December 6, 2013 – September 14, 2014
- Diana McQueen; September 15, 2014 – November 12, 2014
- Jonathan Denis; November 12, 2014 – May 5, 2015
- Opposition House leader: Rob Anderson; May 1, 2012 – December 17, 2014
- Shayne Saskiw; December 22, 2014 – May 5, 2015
- Members: 87 MLA seats

Sovereign
- Monarch: Elizabeth II; February 6, 1952 – September 8, 2022
- Lieutenant governor: Hon. Donald Ethell; May 11, 2010 – June 12, 2015

Sessions
- 1st session May 23, 2012 – March 1, 2014
- 2nd session March 3, 2014 – September 18, 2014
- 3rd session November 17, 2014 – April 7, 2015
← 27th	→ 29th

The 28th Alberta Legislative Assembly was in session from May 23, 2012, to April 7, 2015, with the membership of the assembly determined by the results of the 2012 Alberta general election held on April 23, 2012. The Legislature officially resumed on May 23, 2012, and continued until the third session was prorogued and dissolved on April 7, 2015, prior to the 2015 Alberta general election on May 5, 2015.

Alberta's twenty-sixth government was controlled by the majority Progressive Conservative Association of Alberta, led by Premier Alison Redford until her resignation on March 23, 2014, and subsequently led by Dave Hancock temporarily until Jim Prentice was confirmed leader of the Progressive Conservatives in September. The Official Opposition was led by Danielle Smith of the Wildrose Party until she crossed the floor to join the PCs, and the opposition was subsequently led by Heather Forsyth. The Speaker was Gene Zwozdesky.

== Bills ==
The Public Service Salary Restraint Act (informally referred to as Bill 46) is an Act of the Legislature of Alberta passed in 2013. The Bill was introduced in 2013 by Finance Minister Doug Horner. The bill passed first, second, and third readings and went into effect on December 11, 2013. The law applies only to negotiations with the province's largest public-sector union, the Alberta Union of Provincial Employees (AUPE).

In February 2014 Court of Queen's Bench Justice Denny Thomas granted an indefinite injunction against the Bill saying "the legislation could irreparably harm labour relations, guts the collective bargaining process and effectively emasculates the AUPE".

On April 28, 2014, details emerged of a deal reached between the Hancock government and the AUPE. The tentative agreement called for a lump-sum payment of $1,850 the first year followed by pay increases totalling 6.75 per cent over three years. Members of the AUPE will vote on the agreement in June 2014 before the government ratifies it.

The deal was announced Monday, the same day the government dropped its appeal of an injunction the union won against legislation that would have imposed an austere contract similar to ones that went into effect last year for Alberta physicians and teachers.

== Membership in the 28th Alberta Legislative Assembly ==
Member	Party	Constituency	First elected/ previously elected	No.# of term(s)
Rob Anderson	Wildrose	Airdrie	2008 (Note: First elected as Progressive Conservative)	2nd term
Rob Anderson	Progressive Conservative	Airdrie	2008	2nd term
Jeff Johnson	Progressive Conservative	Athabasca-Sturgeon-Redwater	2008	2nd term
Ron Casey	Progressive Conservative	Banff-Cochrane	2012	1st term
Maureen Kubinec	Progressive Conservative	Barrhead-Morinville-Westlock	2012	1st term
Doug Griffiths (Until January 26, 2015)	Progressive Conservative	Battle River-Wainwright	2002	4th term
Vacant		Battle River-Wainwright	2002	4th term
Genia Leskiw	Progressive Conservative	Bonnyville-Cold Lake	2008	2nd term
Jonathan Denis	Progressive Conservative	Calgary-Acadia	2008	2nd term
Alana DeLong	Progressive Conservative	Calgary-Bow	2001	4th term
Kent Hehr	Liberal	Calgary-Buffalo	2008	2nd term
Yvonne Fritz	Progressive Conservative	Calgary-Cross	1993	6th term
Christine Cusanelli	Progressive Conservative	Calgary-Currie	2012	1st term
Moe Amery	Progressive Conservative	Calgary-East	1993	6th term
Alison Redford (Until August 6, 2014)	Progressive Conservative	Calgary-Elbow	2008	2nd term
Gordon Dirks (From October 27, 2014)	Progressive Conservative	Calgary-Elbow	2014	1st term
Heather Forsyth	Wildrose	Calgary-Fish Creek	1993	6th term
Len Webber (Until September 29, 2014)	Progressive Conservative	Calgary-Foothills	2004	3rd term
Len Webber (Until September 29, 2014)	Independent	Calgary-Foothills	2004	3rd term
Jim Prentice (From October 27, 2014)	Progressive Conservative	Calgary-Foothills	2014	1st term
Wayne Cao	Progressive Conservative	Calgary-Fort	1997	5th term
Linda Johnson	Progressive Conservative	Calgary-Glenmore	2012	1st term
Manmeet Bhullar	Progressive Conservative	Calgary-Greenway	2008	2nd term
Jason Luan	Progressive Conservative	Calgary-Hawkwood	2012	1st term
Ric McIver	Progressive Conservative	Calgary-Hays	2012	1st term
Kyle Fawcett	Progressive Conservative	Calgary-Klein	2008	2nd term
Dave Rodney	Progressive Conservative	Calgary-Lougheed	2004	3rd term
Neil Brown	Progressive Conservative	Calgary-Mackay-Nose Hill	2004	3rd term
Darshan Kang	Liberal	Calgary-McCall	2008	2nd term
David Swann	Liberal	Calgary-Mountain View	2004	3rd term
Sandra Jansen	Progressive Conservative	Calgary-North West	2012	1st term
Teresa Woo-Paw	Progressive Conservative	Calgary-Northern Hills	2008	2nd term
Jeff Wilson	Wildrose	Calgary-Shaw	2012	1st term
Jeff Wilson	Progressive Conservative	Calgary-Shaw	2012	1st term
Rick Fraser	Progressive Conservative	Calgary-South East	2012	1st term
Donna Kennedy-Glans	Progressive Conservative	Calgary-Varsity	2012	1st term
Donna Kennedy-Glans	Independent	Calgary-Varsity	2012	1st term
Donna Kennedy-Glans	Progressive Conservative	Calgary-Varsity	2012	1st term
Ken Hughes (Until September 29, 2014)	Progressive Conservative	Calgary-West	2012	1st term
Mike Ellis (From October 27, 2014)	Progressive Conservative	Calgary-West	2014	1st term
Gary Bikman	Wildrose	Cardston-Taber-Warner	2012	1st term
Gary Bikman	Progressive Conservative	Cardston-Taber-Warner	2012	1st term
Bruce McAllister	Wildrose	Chestermere-Rocky View	2012	1st term
Bruce McAllister	Progressive Conservative	Chestermere-Rocky View	2012	1st term
Drew Barnes	Wildrose	Cypress-Medicine Hat	2012	1st term
Diana McQueen	Progressive Conservative	Drayton Valley-Devon	2008	2nd term
Rick Strankman	Wildrose	Drumheller-Stettler	2012	1st term
Hector Goudreau	Progressive Conservative	Dunvegan-Central Peace-Notley	2001	4th term
Deron Bilous	NDP	Edmonton-Beverly-Clareview	2012	1st term
David Eggen	NDP	Edmonton-Calder	2004, 2012	2nd term*
Thomas Lukaszuk	Progressive Conservative	Edmonton-Castle Downs	2001	4th term
Laurie Blakeman	Liberal	Edmonton-Centre	1997	5th term
Janice Sarich	Progressive Conservative	Edmonton-Decore	2008	2nd term
Naresh Bhardwaj	Progressive Conservative	Edmonton-Ellerslie	2008	2nd term
Heather Klimchuk	Progressive Conservative	Edmonton-Glenora	2008	2nd term
David Dorward	Progressive Conservative	Edmonton-Gold Bar	2012	1st term
Brian Mason	NDP	Edmonton-Highlands-Norwood	2000	5th term
Peter Sandhu	Progressive Conservative	Edmonton-Manning	2008	2nd term
Peter Sandhu	Independent	Edmonton-Manning	2008	2nd term
Peter Sandhu	Progressive Conservative	Edmonton-Manning	2008	2nd term
David Xiao	Progressive Conservative	Edmonton-McClung	2008	2nd term
Raj Sherman	Liberal	Edmonton-Meadowlark	2008	2nd term
Gene Zwozdesky	Progressive Conservative	Edmonton-Mill Creek	1993 (Note: First elected as a Liberal)	6th term
Sohail Quadri	Progressive Conservative	Edmonton-Mill Woods	2012	1st term
Steve Young	Progressive Conservative	Edmonton-Riverview	2012	1st term
Fred Horne	Progressive Conservative	Edmonton-Rutherford	2008	2nd term
Matt Jeneroux	Progressive Conservative	Edmonton-South West	2012	1st term
Rachel Notley	NDP	Edmonton-Strathcona	2008	2nd term
Dave Hancock (Until September 15, 2014)	Progressive Conservative	Edmonton-Whitemud	1997	5th term
Stephen Mandel (From October 27, 2014)	Progressive Conservative	Edmonton-Whitemud	2014	1st term
Don Scott	Progressive Conservative	Fort McMurray-Conklin	2012	1st term
Mike Allen	Progressive Conservative	Fort McMurray-Wood Buffalo	2012	1st term
Mike Allen	Independent	Fort McMurray-Wood Buffalo	2012	1st term
Mike Allen	Progressive Conservative	Fort McMurray-Wood Buffalo	2012	1st term
Jacquie Fenske	Progressive Conservative	Fort Saskatchewan-Vegreville	2012	1st term
Everett McDonald	Progressive Conservative	Grande Prairie-Smoky	2012	1st term
Wayne Drysdale	Progressive Conservative	Grande Prairie-Wapiti	2008	2nd term
Danielle Smith	Wildrose	Highwood	2012	1st term
Danielle Smith	Progressive Conservative	Highwood	2012	1st term
Kerry Towle	Wildrose	Innisfail-Sylvan Lake	2012	1st term
Kerry Towle	Progressive Conservative	Innisfail-Sylvan Lake	2012	1st term
Shayne Saskiw	Wildrose	Lac La Biche-St. Paul-Two Hills	2012	1st term
Rod Fox	Wildrose	Lacombe-Ponoka	2012	1st term
Rod Fox	Progressive Conservative	Lacombe-Ponoka	2012	1st term
George Rogers	Progressive Conservative	Leduc-Beaumont	2004	3rd term
Pearl Calahasen	Progressive Conservative	Lesser Slave Lake	1989	7th term
Bridget Pastoor	Progressive Conservative	Lethbridge-East	2004	3rd term
Greg Weadick	Progressive Conservative	Lethbridge-West	2008	2nd term
Ian Donovan	Wildrose	Little Bow	2012	1st term
Ian Donovan	Progressive Conservative	Little Bow	2012	1st term
Pat Stier	Wildrose	Livingstone-Macleod	2012	1st term
Blake Pedersen	Wildrose	Medicine Hat	2012	1st term
Blake Pedersen	Progressive Conservative	Medicine Hat	2012	1st term
Bruce Rowe	Wildrose	Olds-Didsbury-Three Hills	2012	1st term
Bruce Rowe	Progressive Conservative	Olds-Didsbury-Three Hills	2012	1st term
Frank Oberle	Progressive Conservative	Peace River	2004	3rd term
Mary Anne Jablonski	Progressive Conservative	Red Deer-North	2000	5th term
Cal Dallas	Progressive Conservative	Red Deer-South	2008	2nd term
Joe Anglin	Wildrose	Rimbey-Rocky Mountain House-Sundre	2012	1st term
Joe Anglin	Independent	Rimbey-Rocky Mountain House-Sundre	2012	1st term
Cathy Olesen	Progressive Conservative	Sherwood Park	2012	1st term
Doug Horner (Until January 31, 2015)	Progressive Conservative	Spruce Grove-St. Albert	2001	4th term
Vacant		Spruce Grove-St. Albert	2001	4th term
Stephen Khan	Progressive Conservative	St. Albert	2012	1st term
Ken Lemke	Progressive Conservative	Stony Plain	2012	1st term
Dave Quest	Progressive Conservative	Strathcona-Sherwood Park	2008	2nd term
Jason Hale	Wildrose	Strathmore-Brooks	2012	1st term
Jason Hale	Progressive Conservative	Strathmore-Brooks	2012	1st term
Richard Starke	Progressive Conservative	Vermilion-Lloydminster	2012	1st term
Robin Campbell	Progressive Conservative	West Yellowhead	2008	2nd term
Verlyn Olson	Progressive Conservative	Wetaskiwin-Camrose	2008	2nd term
George VanderBurg	Progressive Conservative	Whitecourt-Ste. Anne	2001	4th term

== Seating plan ==
=== As of March 2014 ===
	Casey	Khan	Xiao		Anglin	Bikman	Fox	Rowe	Strankman	Stier				Webber	Allen	Kennedy-Glans
	Jablonski	Kubinec	Olesen		Barnes	Pedersen	McAllister	Towle	Saskiw	Donovan		Kang	Swann			Eggen	Bilous
	Rogers	Amery	Jeneroux		Wilson	Anderson	Smith	Forsyth	Hale		Sherman	Blakeman	Hehr			Mason	Notley
Zwozdesky
	Drysdale	Oberle	Hughes	McIver	J. Johnson	Horne	Horner	Campbell	Redford	Hancock	McQueen	Klimchuk	Olson	Dallas	Bhullar	Denis	Lukaszuk
		Fritz	Fraser	Rodney	Quest	Griffiths	Starke	Dorward		VanderBurg	Jansen	Woo-Paw	Weadick	Fawcett	Scott	Bhardwaj	Pastoor
	Goudreau	Lemke	Cao	Quadri	Calahasen	Sandhu	McDonald	Fenske		L. Johnson	Leskiw	Cusanelli	Brown	DeLong	Luan	Sarich	Young

Official Seating Plan (Retrieved March 17, 2014)

In the final year of the 28th Assembly, the seating plan changed drastically due to floor-crossing and new party leaders for all four recognized parties.

=== As of March 2015 ===
Leskiw	Fritz	Goudreau	Anderson	Rowe	Pastoor	Cao									Anglin
	Jablonski	Dallas	Hale	DeLong	Horne	Kennedy-Glans		Barnes	Stier	Strankman		Sherman	Kang			Mason	Bilous
	Rogers	Brown	Young	Weadick	Quest	Amery		Forsyth	Saskiw		Blakeman	Swann	Hehr			Notley	Eggen
Zwozdesky
	Khan	Drysdale	J. Johnson	Fawcett	Klimchuk	Dirks	Mandel	Campbell	Prentice	Denis	McQueen	Oberle	Bhullar	Olson	Scott	Kubinec	McIver
	Sarich	Starke	Olesen	Bhardwaj	Dorward	Woo-Paw	McAllister	Lemke		VanderBurg	Jansen	Rodney	Smith	Fraser	Cusanelli	Quadri	Fox
Allen	Wilson	Lukaszuk	Pedersen	Casey	Donovan	Calahasen	Jeneroux	L. Johnson		Ellis	Fenske	McDonald	Xiao	Towle	Bikman	Luan	Sandhu

Official Seating Plan (Retrieved March 10, 2015)

== Standings changes since the 28th general election ==
Number of members per party by date	2012	2013			2014											2015	
Number of members per party by date	Apr 23	May 14	Jul 16	Dec 10	Mar 12	Mar 17	Jul 7	Aug 6	Sep 15	Sep 17	Sep 29	Oct 27	Nov 2	Nov 24	Dec 17	Jan 26	Jan 31
Progressive Conservative	61	60	59	60	59	58	59	58	57	58	57	61		63	72	71	70
Wildrose	17												16	14	5		
Liberal	5																
New Democratic	4																
Alberta Party	0																
Independent	0	1	2	1	2	3	2			1	0		1				
Total members	87							86	85		83	87				86	85
Vacant	0							1	2		4	0				1	2
Government Majority	35	33	31	33	31	29	31	30	29	31		35		39	57	56	55

After the defections of 11 Wildrose MLA's, the Liberals and Wildrose were tied at 5 seats each, but the Speaker ruled that Wildrose would continue as the Official Opposition, a status that carries additional funding and privileges.

Membership changes in the 28th Assembly
Date	Name	District	Party	Reason
April 23, 2012	See list of members			Election day of the 28th Alberta general election
May 14, 2013	Peter Sandhu	Edmonton-Manning	Independent	Left Progressive Conservative caucus
July 16, 2013	Mike Allen	Fort McMurray-Wood Buffalo	Independent	Left Progressive Conservative caucus
December 10, 2013	Peter Sandhu	Edmonton-Manning	Progressive Conservative	Rejoined Progressive Conservative caucus
March 12, 2014	Len Webber	Calgary-Foothills	Independent	Left Progressive Conservative caucus
March 17, 2014	Donna Kennedy-Glans	Calgary-Varsity	Independent	Left Progressive Conservative caucus
July 7, 2014	Mike Allen	Fort McMurray-Wood Buffalo	Progressive Conservative	Rejoined Progressive Conservative caucus
August 6, 2014	Alison Redford	Calgary-Elbow	Progressive Conservative	Resigned seat
September 15, 2014	Dave Hancock	Edmonton-Whitemud	Progressive Conservative	Resigned seat
September 17, 2014	Donna Kennedy-Glans	Calgary-Varsity	Progressive Conservative	Rejoined Progressive Conservative caucus
September 29, 2014	Len Webber	Calgary-Foothills	Independent	Resigned seat
September 29, 2014	Ken Hughes	Calgary-West	Progressive Conservative	Resigned seat
October 27, 2014	Gordon Dirks	Calgary-Elbow	Progressive Conservative	Elected in a by-election
October 27, 2014	Jim Prentice	Calgary-Foothills	Progressive Conservative	Elected in a by-election
October 27, 2014	Mike Ellis	Calgary-West	Progressive Conservative	Elected in a by-election
October 27, 2014	Stephen Mandel	Edmonton-Whitemud	Progressive Conservative	Elected in a by-election
November 2, 2014	Joe Anglin	Rimbey-Rocky Mountain House-Sundre	Independent	Left Wildrose caucus
November 24, 2014	Kerry Towle	Innisfail-Sylvan Lake	Progressive Conservative	Joined Progressive Conservative caucus
November 24, 2014	Ian Donovan	Little Bow	Progressive Conservative	Joined Progressive Conservative caucus
December 17, 2014	Danielle Smith	Highwood	Progressive Conservative	Joined Progressive Conservative caucus
December 17, 2014	Rob Anderson	Airdrie	Progressive Conservative	Joined Progressive Conservative caucus
December 17, 2014	Gary Bikman	Cardston-Taber-Warner	Progressive Conservative	Joined Progressive Conservative caucus
December 17, 2014	Rod Fox	Lacombe-Ponoka	Progressive Conservative	Joined Progressive Conservative caucus
December 17, 2014	Jason Hale	Strathmore-Brooks	Progressive Conservative	Joined Progressive Conservative caucus
December 17, 2014	Bruce McAllister	Chestermere-Rocky View	Progressive Conservative	Joined Progressive Conservative caucus
December 17, 2014	Blake Pedersen	Medicine Hat	Progressive Conservative	Joined Progressive Conservative caucus
December 17, 2014	Bruce Rowe	Olds-Didsbury-Three Hills	Progressive Conservative	Joined Progressive Conservative caucus
December 17, 2014	Jeff Wilson	Calgary-Shaw	Progressive Conservative	Joined Progressive Conservative caucus
January 26, 2015	Doug Griffiths	Battle River-Wainwright	Progressive Conservative	Resigned seat
January 31, 2015	Doug Horner	Spruce Grove-St. Albert	Progressive Conservative	Resigned seat
