= Hancock ministry =

Cabinet of Alberta, 2014

Hancock Ministry
- 15th ministry of Alberta

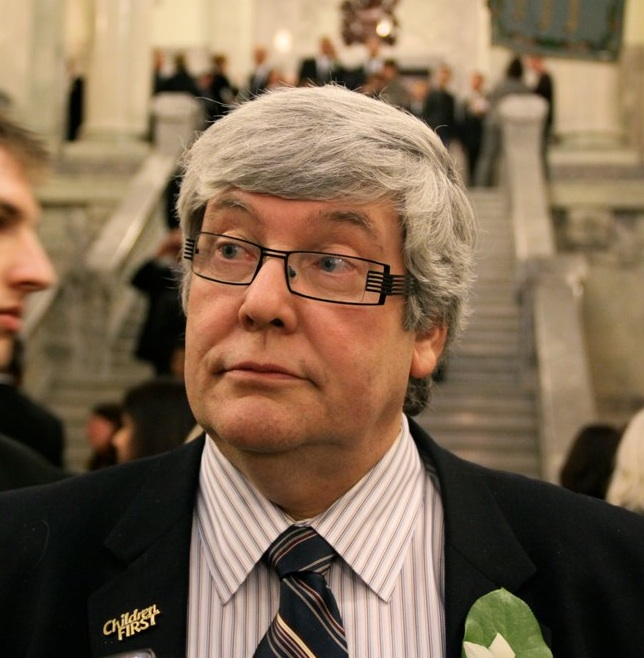
- Dave Hancock in 2011
- Date formed: March 23, 2014
- Date dissolved: September 15, 2014

People and organisations
- Monarch: Elizabeth II
- Lieutenant Governor: Donald Ethell
- Premier: Dave Hancock
- Member party: Progressive Conservative
- Status in legislature: Majority

History
- Legislature term: 28th Alberta Legislature
- Predecessor: Redford Ministry
- Successor: Prentice Ministry

The Hancock Ministry was the combined Cabinet (called Executive Council of Alberta), chaired by 15th Premier of Alberta Dave Hancock, that governed Alberta from March 23, 2014 to September 15, 2014. It was made up of members of the Progressive Conservative Party (PC).

Hancock, previously deputy premier in the Redford Ministry, was sworn into office following Alison Redford's resignation. He inherited Redford's cabinet and, as he was only serving as premier until the party could elect a permanent leader, said he was "not planning to make any real changes in cabinet." However, he also said that any cabinet minister who decides to runs for the leadership must resign, in order to prevent an unfair advantage. On May 7, Ric McIver resigned in order to contest the leadership; he was replaced as infrastructure minister by Wayne Drysdale.

== List of ministers ==
Name		Date Appointed	Date Departed
Dave Hancock	President of the Executive Council (Premier)	March 23, 2014	September 15, 2014
Doug Horner	President of Treasury Board and Minister of Finance	May 8, 2012	September 14, 2014
Frank Oberle Jr.	Minister of Aboriginal Relations	December 13, 2013	September 14, 2014
Verlyn Olson	Minister of Agriculture and Rural Development	May 8, 2012	May 23, 2015
Heather Klimchuk	Minister of Culture	May 8, 2012	September 14, 2014
Jeff Johnson	Minister of Education	May 8, 2012	September 14, 2014
Diana McQueen	Minister of Energy	December 13, 2013	September 14, 2014
Robin Campbell	Minister of Environment and Sustainable Resource Development	December 13, 2013	September 14, 2014
Fred Horne	Minister of Health	May 8, 2012	September 14, 2014
Manmeet Bhullar	Minister of Human Services	December 13, 2013	September 14, 2014
Ric McIver	Minister of Infrastructure	December 13, 2013	May 6, 2014
Wayne Drysdale	Minister of Infrastructure	May 15, 2014	September 14, 2014
Dave Hancock	Minister of Innovation and Advanced Education	December 13, 2013	September 14, 2014
Cal Dallas	Minister of International and Intergovernmental Relations	May 8, 2012	September 14, 2014
Thomas Lukaszuk	Minister of Jobs, Skills, Training and Labour	December 13, 2013	May 22, 2014
Kyle Fawcett	Minister of Jobs, Skills, Training and Labour	May 26, 2014	September 14, 2014
Jonathan Denis	Minister of Justice and Solicitor General	May 8, 2012	April 25, 2015
Ken Hughes	Minister of Municipal Affairs	December 13, 2013	April 7, 2014
Greg Weadick	Minister of Municipal Affairs	May 15, 2014	September 14, 2014
Doug Griffiths	Minister of Service Alberta	December 13, 2013	September 14, 2014
Richard Starke	Minister of Tourism, Parks and Recreation	February 8, 2013	September 14, 2014
Wayne Drysdale	Minister of Transportation	December 13, 2013	May 24, 2015
Naresh Bhardwaj	Associate Minister for Persons with Disabilities	December 13, 2013	March 13, 2015
Rick Fraser	Associate Minister for Public Safety	December 13, 2013	September 14, 2014
Rick Fraser	Associate Minister for Recovery and Reconstruction of High River	June 25, 2013	September 14, 2014
Greg Weadick	Associate Minister for Recovery and Reconstruction of Southeast Alberta	June 25, 2013	May 15, 2014
Dave Quest	Associate Minister for Seniors	December 13, 2013	September 14, 2014
Don Scott	Associate Minister of Accountability, Transparency and Transformation	May 8, 2012	September 14, 2014
Sandra Jansen	Associate Minister of Family and Community Safety	August 1, 2013	September 14, 2014
Teresa Woo-Paw	Associate Minister of International and Intergovernmental Relations	May 8, 2012	September 14, 2014
Kyle Fawcett	Associate Minister of Recovery and Reconstruction of Southwest Alberta	June 25, 2013	May 26, 2014
Dave Rodney	Associate Minister of Wellness	May 8, 2012	September 14, 2014

== See also ==
- Executive Council of Alberta
- List of Alberta provincial ministers
