= Prentice ministry =

Cabinet of Alberta, 2014–2015

Prentice Ministry
- 16th ministry of Alberta

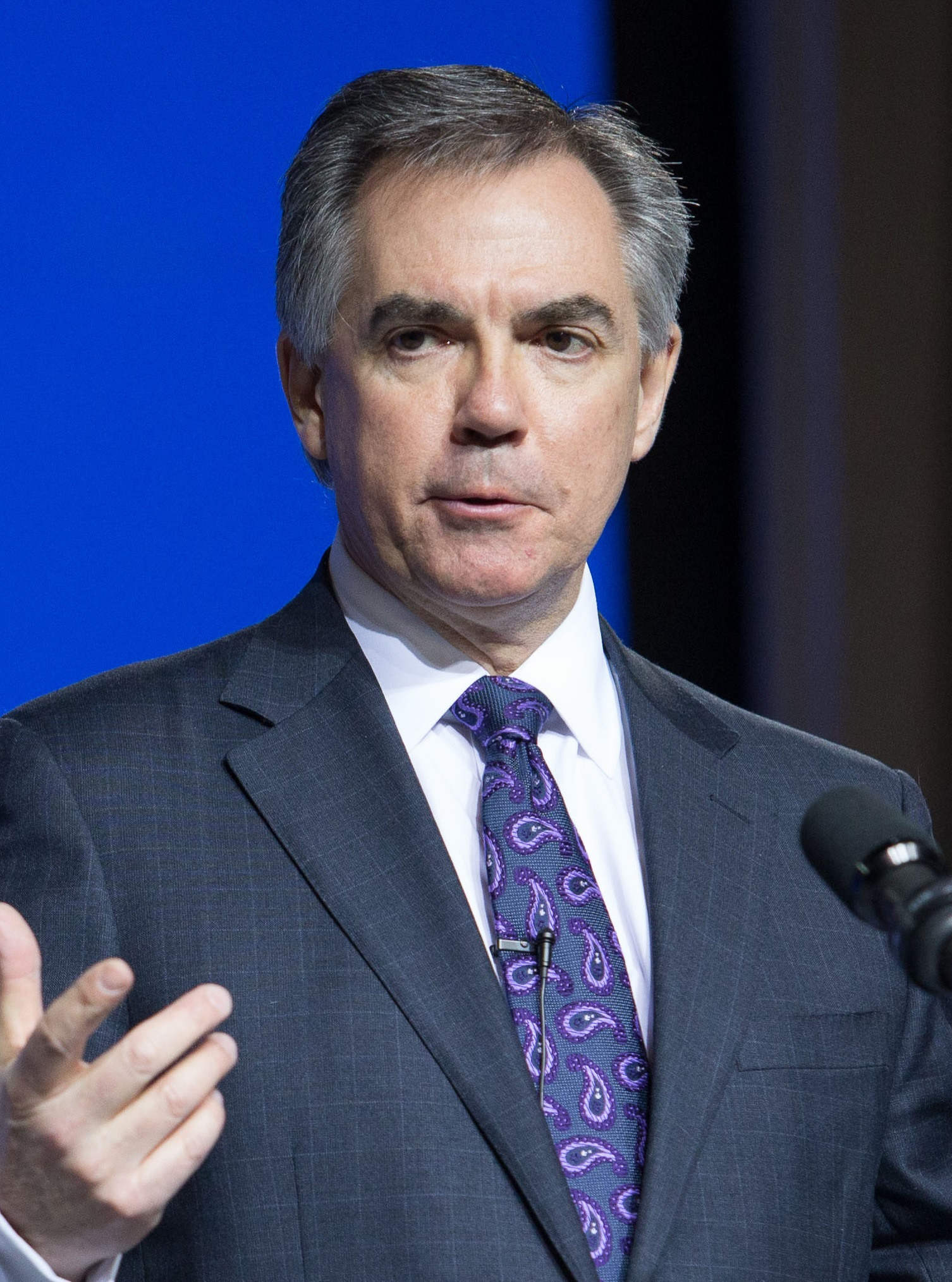
- Jim Prentice in 2014
- Date formed: September 15, 2014
- Date dissolved: May 24, 2015

People and organisations
- Monarch: Elizabeth II
- Lieutenant Governor: Donald Ethell
- Premier: Jim Prentice
- Member party: Progressive Conservative
- Status in legislature: Majority
- Opposition party: Wildrose Party
- Opposition leader: Danielle Smith (2014–2014); Heather Forsyth (2014–2015); Brian Jean (2015–2015)

History
- Legislature term: 28th Alberta Legislature
- Predecessor: Hancock Ministry
- Successor: Notley Ministry

The Prentice Ministry was the combined Cabinet (called Executive Council of Alberta), chaired by 16th Premier of Alberta Jim Prentice, that governed Alberta from September 15, 2014, to May 24, 2015. It was made up of members of the Progressive Conservative Party (PC).

== Cabinet composition and shuffles ==
Prentice's cabinet was sworn in on September 15, 2014. At 16 ministers and three associate ministers, it was significantly smaller than the Redford Ministry, which numbered 19 ministers and 10 associate ministers. Prentice took two portfolios himself: international and intergovernmental relations and aboriginal relations. Prentice dropped several high-profile ministers from cabinet, such as Doug Horner and Fred Horne, and brought in six new members: Gordon Dirks, David Dorward, Stephen Khan, Maureen Kubinec, Stephen Mandel and Ric McIver. Dirks, a former Calgary school board chair, and Mandel, former mayor of Edmonton, were not MLAs at the time of their appointment, becoming the first unelected cabinet ministers in Alberta since the 1930s. Prentice defended their appointments, saying "bringing in new government means bringing in new blood", and stressed that they would run in by-elections before the legislature resumed. Of the ten cabinet ministers who were held over from the Hancock and Redford ministries, six were moved to new portfolios and four — Naresh Bhardwaj, Jonathan Denis, Wayne Drysdale and Verlyn Olson — stayed put.

On April 25, 2015, in the middle of the 2015 Alberta general election, Jonathan Denis resigned as justice minister due to "legal proceedings" against him by his estranged wife. Prentice asked for Denis' resignation due to the involvement of the courts. Agriculture minister Verlyn Olson took over the justice portfolio in an acting capacity.

== List of ministers ==
Name		Date Appointed	Date Departed
Jim Prentice	President of the Executive Council (Premier)	September 15, 2014	May 24, 2015
Robin Campbell	President of Treasury Board and Minister of Finance	September 15, 2014	May 23, 2015
Jim Prentice	Minister of Aboriginal Relations	September 15, 2014	May 23, 2015
Maureen Kubinec	Minister of Culture and Tourism	September 15, 2014	May 23, 2015
Gordon Dirks	Minister of Education	September 15, 2014	May 23, 2015
Frank Oberle Jr.	Minister of Energy	September 15, 2014	May 23, 2015
Kyle Fawcett	Minister of Environment and Sustainable Resource Development	September 15, 2014	May 23, 2015
Stephen Mandel	Minister of Health	September 15, 2014	May 23, 2015
Heather Klimchuk	Minister of Human Services	September 15, 2014	May 23, 2015
Manmeet Bhullar	Minister of Infrastructure	September 15, 2014	May 23, 2015
Don Scott	Minister of Innovation and Advanced Education	September 15, 2014	May 23, 2015
Jim Prentice	Minister of International and Intergovernmental Relations	September 15, 2014	May 23, 2015
Ric McIver	Minister of Jobs, Skills, Training and Labour	September 15, 2014	May 23, 2015
Jonathan Denis	Minister of Justice and Solicitor General	May 8, 2012	April 25, 2015
Diana McQueen	Minister of Municipal Affairs	September 15, 2014	May 23, 2015
Jeff Johnson	Minister of Seniors	September 15, 2014	May 23, 2015
Stephen Khan	Minister of Service Alberta	September 15, 2014	May 23, 2015
David Dorward	Associate Minister of Aboriginal Relations	September 15, 2014	May 23, 2015
Everett McDonald	Associate Minister of Agriculture and Rural Development	March 17, 2015	May 23, 2015
Teresa Woo-Paw	Associate Minister of Asia Pacific Relations	September 15, 2014	May 23, 2015

== See also ==
- Executive Council of Alberta
- List of Alberta provincial ministers
