= Kenney ministry =

Cabinet of Alberta, 2019–2022

Kenney Ministry
- 18th ministry of Alberta
- Date formed: April 30, 2019
- Date dissolved: October 11, 2022

People and organisations
- Monarch: Elizabeth II; Charles III
- Lieutenant Governor: Lois Mitchell (2019–2020); Salma Lakhani (2020–2022)
- Premier: Jason Kenney
- Premier's history: Premiership of Jason Kenney
- Member party: United Conservative
- Status in legislature: Majority
- Opposition party: New Democratic
- Opposition leader: Rachel Notley

History
- Election: 2019 Alberta general election
- Legislature term: 30th Alberta Legislature
- Predecessor: Notley Ministry
- Successor: Smith Ministry

The Kenney Ministry was the combined Cabinet (called Executive Council of Alberta), chaired by 18th Premier of Alberta Jason Kenney, that governed Alberta from April 2019 until October 2022.

During Kenney's tenure, the Executive Council (commonly known as the Cabinet) was made up of members of the United Conservative Party, which held a majority of the seats in the Legislative Assembly of Alberta. The Cabinet was appointed by the Lieutenant Governor of Alberta, Lois Mitchell, on the advice of the premier.

In September 2021, the United Conservative Party board announced a leadership review would take place at the Party's annual general meeting in April 2022, ahead of the previous plans for a leadership review to take place in Fall 2022. In March 2022, the United Conservative Party changed the format for the leadership review, moving to a mail-in ballot beginning in April 2022, with results to be announced on May 18, 2022.

On May 18, 2022, after receiving support from 51.4 per cent of the United Conservative Party members, Kenney announced he would step down as leader of the United Conservative Party. The United Conservative Party caucus met on May 19, 2022, and caucus chair Nathan Neudorf released a statement affirming that Kenney would remain as leader of the party until a new leader is elected. Kenney subsequently sent a letter to the party secretary informing her of his intention to resign as leader of the party after a new leader is elected.

Danielle Smith was selected as the leader of the United Conservative Party in the October 2022 United Conservative Party leadership election, and was sworn in as the 19th Premier of Alberta on October 11, 2022. Smith appointed a new ministry one week later.

== List of members of the Ministry of Jason Kenney ==
Name	Ministry	Date Appointed	Date Departed
Jason Kenney	Premier of Alberta	April 30, 2019	October 11, 2022
Travis Toews	President of the Treasury Board and Minister of Finance	April 30, 2019	May 31, 2022
Jason Nixon	President of the Treasury Board and Minister of Finance	June 21, 2022	October 11, 2022
Jason Nixon	Minister of Environment and Parks	April 30, 2019	June 20, 2022
Whitney Issik	Minister of Environment and Parks	June 21, 2022	October 11, 2022
Sonya Savage	Minister of Energy	April 30, 2019	October 11, 2022
Leela Aheer	Minister of Culture, Multiculturalism and Status of Women	April 30, 2019	July 7, 2021
Ron Orr	Minister of Culture	July 8, 2021	October 11, 2022
Doug Schweitzer	Minister of Justice	April 30, 2019	August 24, 2020
Kaycee Madu	Minister of Justice	August 25, 2020	February 24, 2022
Tyler Shandro	Minister of Justice	February 25, 2022	October 11, 2022
Devin Dreeshen	Minister of Agriculture and Forestry	April 30, 2019	November 5, 2021
Nate Horner	Minister of Agriculture, Forestry and Rural Economic Development	November 5, 2021	October 11, 2022
Tanya Fir	Minister of Economic Development, Trade and Tourism	April 30, 2019	August 24, 2020
Doug Schweitzer	Minister of Jobs, Economy and Innovation	August 25, 2020	August 5, 2022
Tanya Fir	Minister of Jobs, Economy and Innovation	August 26, 2022	October 11, 2022
Nate Glubish	Minister of Service Alberta	April 30, 2019	October 11, 2022
Adriana LaGrange	Minister of Education	April 30, 2019	October 11, 2022
Kaycee Madu	Minister of Municipal Affairs	April 30, 2019	August 24, 2020
Tracy Allard	Minister of Municipal Affairs	August 25, 2020	January 4, 2021
Ric McIver	Minister of Municipal Affairs	January 4, 2021	October 11, 2022
Demetrios Nicolaides	Minister of Advanced Education	April 30, 2019	October 11, 2022
Prasad Panda	Minister of Infrastructure	April 30, 2019	June 20, 2022
Nicholas Milliken	Minister of Infrastructure	June 21, 2022	October 11, 2022
Josephine Pon	Minister of Seniors and Housing	April 30, 2019	October 11, 2022
Rajan Sawhney	Minister of Community and Social Services	April 30, 2019	July 7, 2021
Jason Luan	Minister of Community and Social Services	July 8, 2021	October 11, 2022
Ric McIver	Minister of Transportation	April 30, 2019	July 7, 2021
Rajan Sawhney	Minister of Transportation	July 8, 2021	June 13, 2022
Prasad Panda	Minister of Transportation	June 21, 2022	October 11, 2022
Rebecca Schulz	Minister of Children's Services	April 30, 2019	June 11, 2022
Matt Jones	Minister of Children's Services	June 21, 2022	October 11, 2022
Jason Copping	Minister of Labour and Immigration	April 30, 2019	September 20, 2021
Tyler Shandro	Minister of Labour and Immigration	September 21, 2021	February 24, 2022
Kaycee Madu	Minister of Labour and Immigration	February 25, 2022	October 11, 2022
Tyler Shandro	Minister of Health	April 30, 2019	September 20, 2021
Jason Copping	Minister of Health	September 21, 2021	October 11, 2022
Rick Wilson	Minister of Indigenous Relations	April 30, 2019	October 11, 2022
Brad Rutherford	Minister Without Portfolio	June 21, 2022	October 11, 2022

=== Associate Ministers ===
Name	Ministry	Date Appointed	Date Departed
Grant Hunter	Associate Minister of Red Tape Reduction	April 30, 2019	July 7, 2021
Tanya Fir	Associate Minister of Red Tape Reduction	July 8, 2021	October 11, 2022
Jason Luan	Associate Minister of Mental Health and Addictions	April 30, 2019	July 7, 2021
Mike Ellis	Associate Minister of Mental Health and Addictions	July 8, 2021	October 11, 2022
Muhammad Yaseen	Associate Minister of Immigration and Multiculturalism	July 8, 2021	October 11, 2022
Whitney Issik	Associate Minister for Status of Women	July 8, 2021	June 20, 2022
Jackie Armstrong-Homeniuk	Associate Minister for Status of Women	June 21, 2022	October 11, 2022
Dale Nally	Associate Minister of Natural Gas and Electricity	April 30, 2019	October 11, 2022

== Cabinet shuffles ==
On August 25, 2020, Doug Schweitzer moved from the Department of Justice to a newly formed ministry—Jobs, Economy and Innovation. The new ministry—Jobs, Economy and Innovation replaced the ministry of Economic Development, Trade and Tourism the former Economic Development, Trade and Tourism ministries. Kaycee Madu replaced Schweitzer as Minister of Justice. Tracy Allard became the Minister of Municipal Affairs.

On July 8, 2021, Premier Kenney announced a major cabinet shuffle, moving Rajan Sawhney from Community and Social Services to Transportation; promoting Jason Luan to Community and Social Services; permanently moving Ric McIver to Municipal Affairs; promoting Ron Orr to Culture; dropping Grant Hunter and Leela Aheer from cabinet roles; and adding Nate Horner as Associate Minister of Rural Economic Development, and Mike Ellis as Associate Minister of Mental Health and Addictions.

== See also ==
- Executive Council of Alberta
- List of Alberta provincial ministers
