= Notley ministry =

Cabinet of Alberta, 2015–2019

Notley Ministry
- 17th ministry of Alberta

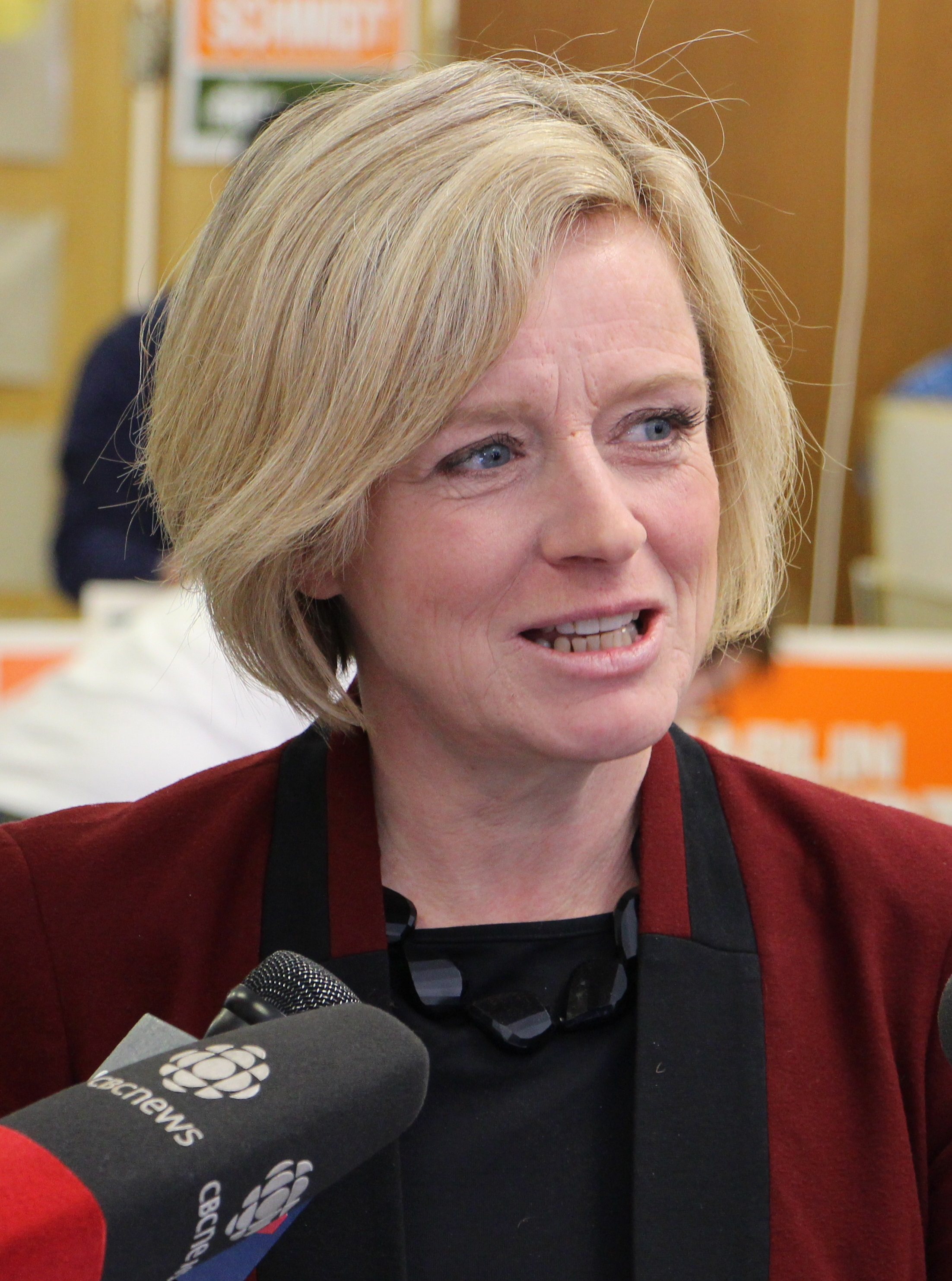
- Rachel Notley in 2015
- Date formed: May 24, 2015
- Date dissolved: April 30, 2019

People and organisations
- Monarch: Elizabeth II
- Lieutenant Governor: Donald Ethell (2015–2015); Lois Mitchell (2015–2019)
- Premier: Rachel Notley
- Deputy Premier: Sarah Hoffman
- Member party: New Democratic
- Status in legislature: Majority
- Opposition party: Wildrose (2015–2017); United Conservative (2017–2019)
- Opposition leader: Brian Jean (2015–2017); Nathan Cooper (2017–2017); Jason Nixon (2017–2018); Jason Kenney (2018–2019)

History
- Election: 2015 Alberta general election
- Legislature term: 29th Alberta Legislature
- Predecessor: Prentice Ministry
- Successor: Kenney Ministry

The Notley Ministry was the combined Cabinet (called Executive Council of Alberta), chaired by 17th Premier of Alberta Rachel Notley, that governed Alberta from May 24, 2015 to April 30, 2019. It was made up of members of the New Democratic Party (NDP).

== Cabinet composition and shuffles ==
The initial cabinet of the Notley ministry was sworn in on May 24, 2015. It consisted of 12 members, including Notley herself, and had an equal number of men and women. Several ministers held multiple portfolios, including Notley, who was also sworn in as minister of international and intergovernmental affairs.

On October 22, 2015, Notley appointed Deron Bilous to head the newly created Ministry of Economic Development and Trade, which oversees all of the province's international trade offices and trade initiatives. Consequently, Lori Sigurdson's portfolio was adjusted from "innovation and advanced education" to "advanced education", and Danielle Larivee took over Bilous' old roles as minister of municipal affairs and Service Alberta.

on February 2, 2016, Notley initiated a major cabinet shuffle, adding six new ministers: Richard Feehan, Christina Gray, Stephanie McLean, Ricardo Miranda, Brandy Payne and Marlin Schmidt. Explaining the expansion, Notley said "It was never our plan to keep the cabinet [at 12 ministers] … It was our plan to focus on our priorities and get a lay of the land and establish a key overarching framework," and that it was necessary to spread out duties and responsibilities as the government implemented more changes. To that end, Feehan and Miranda both split an existing minister's workload (Miranda taking culture and tourism from Eggen, who remained minister of education; and Feehan taking the indigenous relations file from Ganley, who remained minister of justice), while Payne was named associate minister of health. Sigurdson moved to the new portfolio of seniors and housing, with her old portfolios (labour and advanced education) assigned to Gray and Schmidt, respectively. McLean replaced Larivee at Services Alberta, who moved to municipal affairs. Additionally, health minister Sarah Hoffman was elevated to deputy premier.

Notley made two small shuffles in 2017. On January 19, Notley created a new Department of Children's Services out of the Human Services Department, and named Larivee as its first minister; the remaining human services ministry, still headed by Irfan Sabir, was renamed "Ministry of Community and Social Services". Shaye Anderson succeeded Larivee as minister of municipal affairs. On October 17, Sandra Jansen was appointed to cabinet as minister of infrastructure, taking over from Brian Mason; Mason remained minister of transportation.

On June 18, 2018, Notley dropped Payne and McLean after they announced they would not run for re-election. Brian Malkinson was named the new minister of Service Alberta, while Larivee took McLean's responsibility for status of women.

== List of ministers ==
=== List of ministers by portfolio ===
Notley ministry by portfolio
Portfolio	Minister	Tenure
Premier of Alberta	Rachel Notley	May 24, 2015 – April 30, 2019
Deputy Premier of Alberta	Sarah Hoffman	February 2, 2016 – April 30, 2019
Minister of Advanced Education (Note: "Innovation and Advanced Education" from May 24, 2015 to October 22, 2015)	Lori Sigurdson	May 24, 2015 – February 2, 2016
Minister of Advanced Education	Marlin Schmidt	February 2, 2016 – April 30, 2019
Minister of Agriculture and Forestry	Oneil Carlier	May 24, 2015 – April 30, 2019
Minister of Children's Services	Danielle Larivee	January 19, 2017 – April 30, 2019
Minister of Community and Social Services (Note: Styled "Minister of Human Services" from May 24, 2015 to January 19, 2017)	Irfan Sabir	May 24, 2015 – April 30, 2019
Minister of Culture and Tourism	David Eggen	May 24, 2015 – February 2, 2016
Minister of Culture and Tourism	Ricardo Miranda	February 2, 2016 – April 30, 2019
Minister of Economic Development and Trade	Deron Bilous	October 22, 2015 – April 30, 2019
Minister of Education	David Eggen	May 24, 2015 – April 30, 2019
Minister of Energy	Marg McCuaig-Boyd	May 24, 2015 – April 30, 2019
Minister of Environment and Parks	Shannon Phillips	May 24, 2015 – April 30, 2019
Minister of Finance and President of the Treasury Board	Joe Ceci	May 24, 2015 – April 30, 2019
Minister of Justice and Solicitor General	Kathleen Ganley	May 24, 2015 – April 30, 2019
Minister of Health	Sarah Hoffman	May 24, 2015 – April 30, 2019
Associate Minister of Health	Brandy Payne	February 2, 2016 – June 18, 2018
Minister of Indigenous Relations (Note: Styled "Minister of Aboriginal Affairs" from May 24, 2015 to February 2, 2016)	Kathleen Ganley	May 24, 2015 – February 2, 2016
Minister of Indigenous Relations	Richard Feehan	February 2, 2016 – April 30, 2019
Minister of Infrastructure	Brian Mason	May 24, 2015 – October 17, 2017
Minister of Infrastructure	Sandra Jansen	October 17, 2017 – April 30, 2019
Minister of International and Intergovernmental Affairs	Rachel Notley	May 24, 2015 – April 30, 2019
Minister of Labour	Lori Sigurdson	May 24, 2015 – February 2, 2016
Minister of Labour	Christina Gray	February 2, 2016 – April 30, 2019
Minister of Municipal Affairs	Deron Bilous	May 24, 2015 – October 22, 2015
Minister of Municipal Affairs	Danielle Larivee	October 22, 2015 – January 29, 2017
Minister of Municipal Affairs	Shaye Anderson	January 19, 2017 – April 30, 2019
Minister of Seniors	Sarah Hoffman	May 24, 2015 – February 2, 2016
Minister of Seniors and Housing	Lori Sigurdson	February 2, 2016 – April 30, 2019
Minister of Service Alberta	Deron Bilous	May 24, 2015 – October 22, 2015
Minister of Service Alberta	Danielle Larivee	October 22, 2015 – February 2, 2016
Minister of Service Alberta	Stephanie McLean	February 2, 2016 – June 18, 2018
Minister of Service Alberta	Brian Malkinson	June 18, 2018 – April 30, 2019
Minister of Transportation	Brian Mason	May 24, 2015 – April 30, 2019
Minister responsible for Democratic Renewal	Christina Gray	February 2, 2016 – April 30, 2019
Minister responsible for Status of Women	Shannon Phillips	May 24, 2015 – February 2, 2016
Minister responsible for Status of Women	Stephanie McLean	February 2, 2016 – June 18, 2018
Minister responsible for Status of Women	Danielle Larivee	June 18, 2018 – April 30, 2019

=== List of ministers by minister ===
Notley ministry by minister
Minister	Portfolio	Tenure
Shaye Anderson	Minister of Municipal Affairs	January 19, 2017 – April 30, 2019
Deron Bilous	Minister of Municipal Affairs	May 24, 2015 – October 22, 2015
Deron Bilous	Minister of Service Alberta	May 24, 2015 – October 22, 2015
Deron Bilous	Minister of Economic Development and Trade	October 22, 2015 – April 30, 2019
Oneil Carlier	Minister of Agriculture and Forestry	May 24, 2015 – April 30, 2019
Joe Ceci	Minister of Finance and President of the Treasury Board	May 24, 2015 – April 30, 2019
David Eggen	Minister of Culture and Tourism	May 24, 2015 – February 2, 2016
David Eggen	Minister of Education	May 24, 2015 – April 30, 2019
Richard Feehan	Minister of Indigenous Relations	February 2, 2016 – April 30, 2019
Kathleen Ganley	Minister of Justice and Solicitor General	May 24, 2015 – April 30, 2019
Kathleen Ganley	Minister of Aboriginal Affairs	May 24, 2015 – February 2, 2016
Christina Gray	Minister of Labour	February 2, 2016 – April 30, 2019
Christina Gray	Minister responsible for Democratic Renewal	February 2, 2016 – April 30, 2019
Sarah Hoffman	Minister of Health	May 24, 2015 – April 30, 2019
Sarah Hoffman	Deputy Premier of Alberta	February 2, 2016 – April 30, 2019
Sarah Hoffman	Minister of Seniors	May 24, 2015 – February 2, 2016
Sandra Jansen	Minister of Infrastructure	October 17, 2017 – April 30, 2019
Danielle Larivee	Minister of Municipal Affairs	October 22, 2015 – January 19, 2017
Danielle Larivee	Minister of Service Alberta	October 22, 2015 – February 2, 2016
Danielle Larivee	Minister of Children's Services	January 19, 2017 – April 30, 2019
Danielle Larivee	Minister responsible for Status of Women	June 18, 2018 – April 30, 2019
Brian Malkinson	Minister of Service Alberta	June 18, 2018 – April 30, 2019
Brian Mason	Minister of Infrastructure	May 24, 2015 – October 17, 2017
Brian Mason	Minister of Transportation	May 24, 2015 – April 30, 2019
Marg McCuaig-Boyd	Minister of Energy	May 24, 2015 – April 30, 2019
Stephanie McLean	Minister of Service Alberta	February 2, 2016 – June 18, 2018
Stephanie McLean	Minister responsible for Status of Women	February 2, 2016 – June 18, 2018
Ricardo Miranda	Minister of Culture and Tourism	February 2, 2016 – April 30, 2019
Rachel Notley	Premier of Alberta	May 24, 2015 – April 30, 2019
Rachel Notley	Minister of International and Intergovernmental Affairs	May 24, 2015 – April 30, 2019
Brandy Payne	Associate Minister of Health	February 2, 2016 – June 18, 2018
Shannon Phillips	Minister of Environment and Parks	May 24, 2015 – April 30, 2019
Shannon Phillips	Minister responsible for Status of Women	May 24, 2015 – February 2, 2016
Irfan Sabir	Minister of Community and Social Services	May 24, 2015 – April 30, 2019
Marlin Schmidt	Minister of Advanced Education	February 2, 2016 – April 30, 2019
Lori Sigurdson	Minister of Innovation and Advanced Education	May 24, 2015 – October 22, 2015
Lori Sigurdson	Minister of Advanced Education	October 22, 2015 – February 2, 2016
Lori Sigurdson	Minister of Labour	May 24, 2015 – February 2, 2016
Lori Sigurdson	Minister of Seniors and Housing	February 2, 2016 – April 30, 2019

== See also ==
- Executive Council of Alberta
- List of Alberta provincial ministers
