= Stelmach ministry =

Cabinet of Alberta, 2006–2011

Stelmach Ministry
- 13th ministry of Alberta

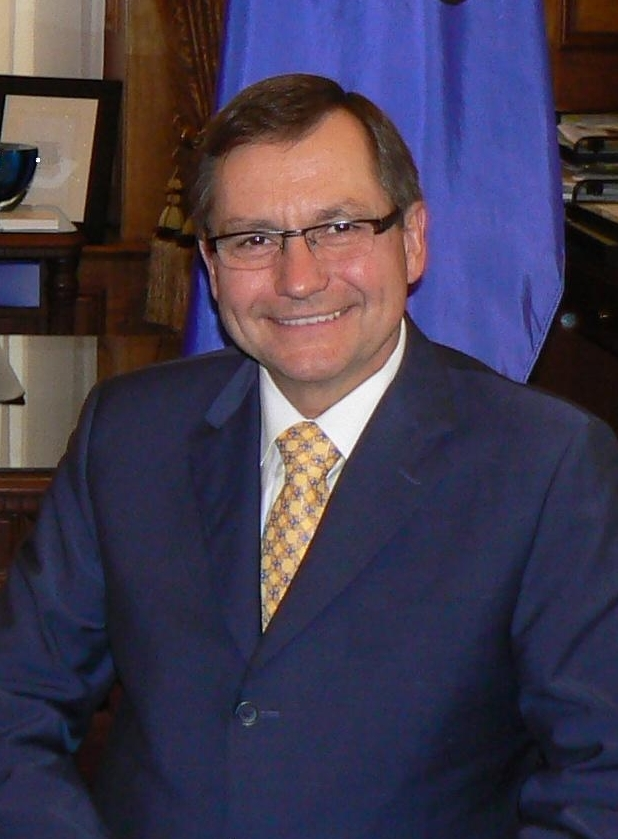
- Ed Stelmach in April 2006
- Date formed: December 14, 2006
- Date dissolved: October 7, 2011

People and organisations
- Monarch: Elizabeth II
- Lieutenant Governor: Norman Kwong; Donald Ethell
- Premier: Ed Stelmach
- Member party: Progressive Conservative
- Status in legislature: Majority

History
- Legislature terms: 26th Alberta Legislature; 27th Alberta Legislature
- Predecessor: Klein Ministry
- Successor: Redford Ministry

The Stelmach Ministry was the combined Cabinet (called Executive Council of Alberta), chaired by thirteenth Premier Ed Stelmach, and Ministers that governed Alberta shortly after the conclusion of the first session of the 26th Alberta Legislature from December 14, 2006, to the mid-point of the fourth session of the 27th Alberta Legislature on October 7, 2011.

The Executive Council (commonly known as the cabinet) is made up of members of the Alberta Progressive Conservative Party which held a majority of the seats in the Legislative Assembly of Alberta. The cabinet was appointed by the Lieutenant Governor of Alberta on the advice of the premier. Members of the council are styled "the Honourable" only for the duration of their membership, not for life.

The first Stelmach ministry was sworn in on December 15, 2006, after Stelmach took over the leadership of Alberta Conservatives following the 2006 leadership election, until February 4, 2008 when the legislature was dissolved and an election was called. The second Stelmach cabinet was sworn in on March 12, 2008, and continued until October 7, 2011, when Alison Redford succeeded Stelmach as premier.

== Cabinets of Ed Stelmach ==
Name		Date Appointed	Date Departed
Ed Stelmach	President of the Executive Council (Premier)	December 14, 2006	October 7, 2011
Ron Stevens	Deputy Premier	June 27, 2007	May 15, 2009
Doug Horner	Deputy Premier	January 15, 2010	February 4, 2011
Gene Zwozdesky	Minister of Aboriginal Relations	March 13, 2008	January 14, 2010
Len Webber	Minister of Aboriginal Relations	January 15, 2010	October 11, 2011
Doug Horner	Minister of Advanced Education and Technology	December 15, 2006	February 4, 2011
Greg Weadick	Minister of Advanced Education and Technology	February 18, 2011	May 7, 2012
George Groeneveld	Minister of Agriculture and Rural Development	December 15, 2006	January 14, 2010
Jack Hayden	Minister of Agriculture and Rural Development	January 15, 2010	October 11, 2011
Janis Tarchuk	Minister of Children and Youth Services	December 15, 2006	January 14, 2010
Yvonne Fritz	Minister of Children and Youth Services	January 15, 2010	October 11, 2011
Lindsay Blackett	Minister of Culture and Community Spirit	March 13, 2008	October 11, 2011
Ron Liepert	Minister of Education	December 15, 2006	March 12, 2008
Dave Hancock	Minister of Education	March 13, 2008	October 11, 2011
Hector Goudreau	Minister of Employment and Immigration	March 13, 2008	January 14, 2010
Thomas Lukaszuk	Minister of Employment and Immigration	January 15, 2010	October 11, 2011
Iris Evans	Minister of Employment, Immigration and Industry	December 15, 2006	March 12, 2008
Mel Knight	Minister of Energy	December 15, 2006	January 14, 2010
Ron Liepert	Minister of Energy	January 15, 2010	October 11, 2011
Lyle Oberg	Minister of Finance	December 15, 2006	March 12, 2008
Iris Evans	Minister of Finance and Enterprise	March 13, 2008	January 14, 2010
Ted Morton	Minister of Finance and Enterprise	January 15, 2010	January 28, 2011
Lloyd Snelgrove	Minister of Finance and Enterprise	January 31, 2011	October 11, 2011
Dave Hancock	Minister of Health and Wellness	December 15, 2006	March 12, 2008
Ron Liepert	Minister of Health and Wellness	March 13, 2008	January 14, 2010
Gene Zwozdesky	Minister of Health and Wellness	January 15, 2010	October 11, 2011
Yvonne Fritz	Minister of Housing and Urban Affairs	March 13, 2008	January 14, 2010
Jonathan Denis	Minister of Housing and Urban Affairs	January 15, 2010	October 11, 2011
Jack Hayden	Minister of Infrastructure	March 13, 2008	January 14, 2010
Ray Danyluk	Minister of Infrastructure	January 15, 2010	October 11, 2011
Luke Ouellette	Minister of Infrastructure and Transportation	December 15, 2006	March 12, 2008
Ron Stevens	Minister of International and Intergovernmental Relations	March 13, 2008	May 15, 2009
Len Webber	Minister of International and Intergovernmental Relations	September 17, 2009	January 14, 2010
Iris Evans	Minister of International and Intergovernmental Relations	January 15, 2010	October 11, 2011
Guy Boutilier	Minister of International, Intergovernmental and Aboriginal Relations	December 15, 2006	March 12, 2008
Alison Redford	Minister of Justice and Attorney General	March 13, 2008	February 16, 2011
Verlyn Olson	Minister of Justice and Attorney General	February 18, 2011	May 7, 2012
Ray Danyluk	Minister of Municipal Affairs	March 13, 2008	January 18, 2010
Hector Goudreau	Minister of Municipal Affairs	January 19, 2010	October 11, 2011
Ray Danyluk	Minister of Municipal Affairs and Housing	December 15, 2006	March 12, 2008
Greg Melchin	Minister of Seniors and Community Supports	December 15, 2006	March 12, 2008
Mary Anne Jablonski	Minister of Seniors and Community Supports	March 13, 2008	October 11, 2011
Lloyd Snelgrove	Minister of Service Alberta	December 15, 2006	March 12, 2008
Heather Klimchuk	Minister of Service Alberta	March 13, 2008	October 11, 2011
Ted Morton	Minister of Sustainable Resource Development	December 15, 2006	January 14, 2010
Mel Knight	Minister of Sustainable Resource Development	January 15, 2010	October 11, 2011
Rob Renner	Minister of the Environment	December 15, 2006	October 11, 2011
Cindy Ady	Minister of Tourism, Parks and Recreation	March 13, 2008	October 11, 2011
Hector Goudreau	Minister of Tourism, Parks, Recreation and Culture	December 15, 2006	March 12, 2008
Luke Ouellette	Minister of Transportation	March 13, 2008	October 11, 2011
Lloyd Snelgrove	President of the Treasury Board	December 15, 2006	October 11, 2011
Fred Lindsay	Solicitor General and Minister of Public Security	December 15, 2006	January 14, 2010
Frank Oberle Jr.	Solicitor General and Minister of Public Security	January 15, 2010	October 11, 2011
Gene Zwozdesky	Associate Minister for Capital Planning	June 27, 2007	March 12, 2008
Yvonne Fritz	Associate Minister of Affordable Housing and Urban Development	June 27, 2007	March 12, 2008
Cindy Ady	Associate Minister of Tourism Promotion	June 27, 2007	March 12, 2008

== See also ==
- Executive Council of Alberta
- List of Alberta provincial ministers
