= Douglas Mitchell =

Canadian football player, executive and commissioner (1939–2022)

Doug Mitchell OC AOE QC
- Born: February 19, 1939; Calgary, Alberta, Canada
- Died: July 20, 2022 (aged 83)
- Football career

Profile
- Position: Tackle

Personal information
- Listed height: 6 ft 0 in (1.83 m)
- Listed weight: 200 lb (91 kg)

Career information
- College: Colorado College; University of British Columbia

Career history

Playing
- 1960: BC Lions

Operations
- 1984–1988: CFL Commissioner
- Canadian Football Hall of Fame (Class of 2021)

Douglas Harding Mitchell, OC AOE QC (February 19, 1939 – July 20, 2022), was a Canadian football player, executive, and commissioner.

A graduate of Colorado College and the University of British Columbia (UBC), Mitchell played three games for the BC Lions in 1960. He earned a Bachelor of Laws degree from UBC in 1962.

Mitchell later became the commissioner of the CFL, serving from 1984 to 1988.

He was inducted into the Alberta Sports Hall of Fame, was named Sportsman of the Year in 2007 by the Calgary Booster Club and in 2010 was listed by the Globe and Mail as one of the Power 50 of Canadian sports. His professional and community-based achievements were recognized with an appointment to the Order of Canada in 2004 and in 2007 he was inducted into the Alberta Order of Excellence.

He worked at the national law firm of Borden Ladner Gervais, and as of 2011 sat on the CFL Board of Governors. He was married to Lois Mitchell, who was lieutenant governor of Alberta from 2015 to 2020. Doug Mitchell was also the father of Scott Mitchell, president of the Hamilton Tiger-Cats since 2007.

The Doug Mitchell Thunderbird Sports Centre on the campus of UBC and the Mitchell Bowl semifinal of U Sports football are named in his honour. Mitchell and his wife also founded the U Sports Athletes of the Year Awards, given annually to the top male and female athletes in U Sports. In 2019, he was awarded the Order of Sport, marking his induction into Canada's Sports Hall of Fame. He was inducted into the Canadian Football Hall of Fame as a builder in 2021.

Mitchell died on July 20, 2022.
