= Redford ministry =

Cabinet of Alberta, 2011–2014

Redford Ministry
- 14th ministry of Alberta

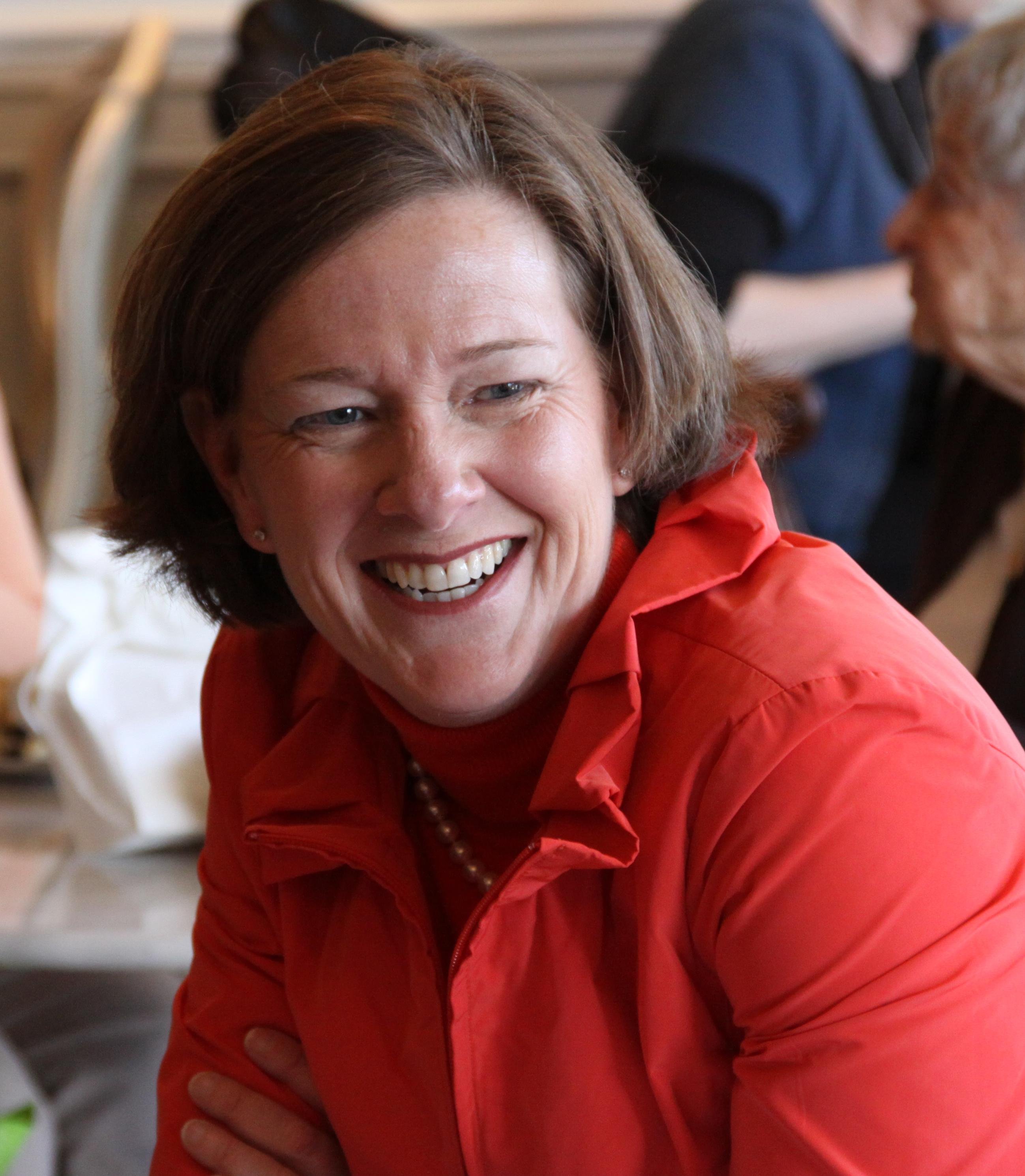
- Alison Redford in 2012
- Date formed: October 7, 2011
- Date dissolved: March 23, 2014

People and organisations
- Monarch: Elizabeth II
- Lieutenant Governor: Donald Ethell
- Premier: Alison Redford
- Member party: Progressive Conservative
- Status in legislature: Majority

History
- Legislature terms: 27th Alberta Legislature; 28th Alberta Legislature
- Predecessor: Stelmach Ministry
- Successor: Hancock Ministry

The Redford Ministry was the combined Cabinet (called Executive Council of Alberta), chaired by fourteenth Premier Alison Redford, and Ministers that governed Alberta halfway through the fourth session of the 27th Alberta Legislature from October 7, 2011, to the early part of the second session of the 28th Alberta Legislature on March 23, 2014.

The Executive Council (commonly known as the cabinet) was made up of members of the Alberta Progressive Conservative Party which holds a majority of seats in the Legislative Assembly of Alberta. The cabinet was appointed by the Lieutenant Governor of Alberta on the advice of the premier. Members of the council are styled "the Honourable" only for the duration of their membership, not for life.

== Cabinets of Alison Redford ==
=== First Cabinet ===
The first Redford ministry was in place from October 12, 2011, after Redford took over the leadership of Alberta Conservatives following the 2011 leadership election, until May 8, 2012 after she won re-election.

Members are listed in order of precedence.

Lieutenant-Governor
His Honour The Honourable Donald Ethell	(2010-2015)
Portfolio	Minister
Premier of Alberta and President of the Executive Council	Alison Redford
President of the Treasury Board and Enterprise	Doug Horner
Minister of Human Services and Government House Leader	Dave Hancock
Minister of Energy	Ted Morton
Minister of Justice and Attorney General and Deputy Government House Leader	Verlyn Olson
Minister of Health and Wellness	Fred Horne
Minister of Finance	Ron Liepert
Minister of Education	Thomas Lukaszuk
Minister of Environment and Water	Diana McQueen
Solicitor General of Alberta and Minister of Public Safety Deputy Government House Leader	Jonathan Denis
Minister of International, Intergovernmental and Aboriginal Relations	Cal Dallas
Minister of Agriculture and Rural Development	Evan Berger
Minister of Sustainable Resource Development	Frank Oberle, Jr.
Minister of Transportation	Ray Danyluk
Minister of Infrastructure	Jeff Johnson
Minister of Municipal Affairs	Doug Griffiths
Minister of Advanced Education and Technology	Greg Weadick
Minister of Tourism, Parks and Recreation	Hector Goudreau Richard Starke
Minister of Culture and Community Services	Heather Klimchuk
Minister of Service Alberta	Manmeet Bhullar

== List of members of the Redford Ministry ==
Name		Date Appointed	Date Departed
Alison Redford	President of the Executive Council (Premier)	October 7, 2011	March 23, 2014
Doug Horner	Deputy Premier	October 12, 2011	May 7, 2012
Thomas Lukaszuk	Deputy Premier	May 8, 2012	December 12, 2013
Dave Hancock	Deputy Premier	December 13, 2013	March 23, 2014
Doug Horner	President of Treasury Board and Enterprise	October 12, 2011	May 7, 2012
Doug Horner	President of Treasury Board and Minister of Finance	May 8, 2012	September 14, 2014
Robin Campbell	Minister of Aboriginal Relations	May 8, 2012	December 12, 2013
Frank Oberle Jr.	Minister of Aboriginal Relations	December 13, 2013	September 14, 2014
Evan Berger	Minister of Agriculture and Rural Development	October 12, 2011	May 7, 2012
Verlyn Olson	Minister of Agriculture and Rural Development	May 8, 2012	May 23, 2015
Heather Klimchuk	Minister of Culture	May 8, 2012	September 14, 2014
Heather Klimchuk	Minister of Culture and Community Services	October 12, 2011	May 7, 2012
Thomas Lukaszuk	Minister of Education	October 12, 2011	May 7, 2012
Jeff Johnson	Minister of Education	May 8, 2012	September 14, 2014
Ted Morton	Minister of Energy	October 12, 2011	May 7, 2012
Ken Hughes	Minister of Energy	May 8, 2012	December 12, 2013
Diana McQueen	Minister of Energy	December 13, 2013	September 14, 2014
Stephen Khan	Minister of Enterprise and Advanced Education	May 8, 2012	February 7, 2013
Thomas Lukaszuk	Minister of Enterprise and Advanced Education	February 8, 2013	December 12, 2013
Diana McQueen	Minister of Environment and Sustainable Resource Development	May 8, 2012	December 12, 2013
Robin Campbell	Minister of Environment and Sustainable Resource Development	December 13, 2013	September 14, 2014
Diana McQueen	Minister of Environment and Water	October 12, 2011	May 7, 2012
Ron Liepert	Minister of Finance	October 12, 2011	May 7, 2012
Fred Horne	Minister of Health	May 8, 2012	September 14, 2014
Fred Horne	Minister of Health and Wellness	October 12, 2011	May 7, 2012
Dave Hancock	Minister of Human Services	October 12, 2011	December 12, 2013
Manmeet Bhullar	Minister of Human Services	December 13, 2013	September 14, 2014
Jeff Johnson	Minister of Infrastructure	October 12, 2011	May 7, 2012
Wayne Drysdale	Minister of Infrastructure	May 8, 2012	December 12, 2013
Ric McIver	Minister of Infrastructure	December 13, 2013	May 6, 2014
Dave Hancock	Minister of Innovation and Advanced Education	December 13, 2013	September 14, 2014
Cal Dallas	Minister of Intergovernmental, International and Aboriginal Relations	October 12, 2011	May 7, 2012
Cal Dallas	Minister of International and Intergovernmental Relations	May 8, 2012	September 14, 2014
Thomas Lukaszuk	Minister of Jobs, Skills, Training and Labour	December 13, 2013	May 22, 2014
Jonathan Denis	Minister of Justice and Solicitor General	May 8, 2012	April 25, 2015
Doug Griffiths	Minister of Municipal Affairs	October 12, 2011	December 12, 2013
Ken Hughes	Minister of Municipal Affairs	December 13, 2013	April 7, 2014
George VanderBurg	Minister of Seniors	October 12, 2011	May 7, 2012
Manmeet Bhullar	Minister of Service Alberta	October 12, 2011	December 12, 2013
Doug Griffiths	Minister of Service Alberta	December 13, 2013	September 14, 2014
Frank Oberle Jr.	Minister of Sustainable Resource Development	October 12, 2011	May 7, 2012
Jack Hayden	Minister of Tourism, Parks and Recreation	October 12, 2011	May 7, 2012
Christine Cusanelli	Minister of Tourism, Parks and Recreation	May 15, 2012	February 7, 2013
Richard Starke	Minister of Tourism, Parks and Recreation	February 8, 2013	September 14, 2014
Ray Danyluk	Minister of Transportation	October 12, 2011	May 7, 2012
Ric McIver	Minister of Transportation	May 8, 2012	December 12, 2013
Wayne Drysdale	Minister of Transportation	December 13, 2013	May 24, 2015
Jonathan Denis	Solicitor General and Minister of Public Security	October 12, 2011	May 7, 2012
Donna Kennedy-Glans	Associate Minister for Electricity and Renewable Energy	December 13, 2013	March 17, 2014
Naresh Bhardwaj	Associate Minister for Persons with Disabilities	December 13, 2013	March 13, 2015
Rick Fraser	Associate Minister for Public Safety	December 13, 2013	September 14, 2014
Rick Fraser	Associate Minister for Recovery and Reconstruction of High River	June 25, 2013	September 14, 2014
Greg Weadick	Associate Minister for Recovery and Reconstruction of Southeast Alberta	June 25, 2013	May 15, 2014
Dave Quest	Associate Minister for Seniors	December 13, 2013	September 14, 2014
Don Scott	Associate Minister of Accountability, Transparency and Transformation	May 8, 2012	September 14, 2014
Sandra Jansen	Associate Minister of Family and Community Safety	August 1, 2013	September 14, 2014
Kyle Fawcett	Associate Minister of Finance	May 8, 2012	June 24, 2013
Teresa Woo-Paw	Associate Minister of International and Intergovernmental Relations	May 8, 2012	September 14, 2014
Greg Weadick	Associate Minister of Municipal Affairs	May 8, 2012	June 24, 2013
Kyle Fawcett	Associate Minister of Recovery and Reconstruction of Southwest Alberta	June 25, 2013	May 26, 2014
George VanderBurg	Associate Minister of Seniors	May 8, 2012	December 12, 2013
Frank Oberle Jr.	Associate Minister of Services for Persons with Disabilities	May 8, 2012	December 12, 2013
Dave Rodney	Associate Minister of Wellness	May 8, 2012	September 14, 2014

== See also ==
- Executive Council of Alberta
- List of Alberta provincial ministers
