= Marie Renaud =

Canadian politician

Marie Renaud MLA

Critic, Community and Social Services; and Francophone Issues
- Incumbent
- Assumed office May 13, 2019
- Leader: Rachel Notley

Member of the Legislative Assembly of Alberta for St. Albert
- Incumbent
- Assumed office May 5, 2015
- Preceded by: Stephen Khan

Personal details
- Born: 1964 or 1965 (age 61–62) Quebec, Canada
- Party: Alberta New Democratic Party
- Education: University of Alberta; MacEwan University
- Occupation: executive

Marie Renaud (born 1964 or 1965) is a Canadian politician who was first elected in the 2015 Alberta general election to the Legislative Assembly of Alberta representing the electoral district of St. Albert and was re-elected in the 2019 and 2023 Alberta general elections.

== Personal life ==
Renaud holds a university certificate in counselling women from the Women's and Gender studies department at the University of Alberta, and a diploma in Community Disability Studies from MacEwan University.

Renaud has sat on various boards, including Handicapped Housing Society of Alberta, Alberta Avenue Business Revitalization Zone and Norwood Neighborhood Association. She has also served on various committees, including the Rehabilitation Practitioner Advisory Committee for MacEwan University and the St. Albert Accessible Transportation Advisory Committee.

Before being elected, Renaud worked at the Women's Economic and Business Solutions Society and seven years as an instructor at MacEwan University. Renaud also worked for Lo-Se-Ca Foundation as the Executive Director for almost 15 years.

== Electoral history ==
=== 2023 general election ===
2023 Alberta general election: St. Albert
| Party | Candidate | Votes | % | ±% |
|---|---|---|---|---|
| New Democratic | Marie Renaud | 15,021 | 58.50 | +12.29 |
| United Conservative | Angela Wood | 10,200 | 39.73 | -0.29 |
| Green | Cameron Jefferies | 455 | 1.77 | +0.91 |
| Total | | 25,676 | 99.38 | – |
| Rejected and declined | | 161 | 0.62 | |
| Turnout | | 25,837 | 66.40 | |
| Eligible voters | | 38,909 | | |
| New Democratic hold | | Swing | | +6.29 |
Source(s) Source: Elections Alberta

=== 2019 general election ===
2019 Alberta general election: St. Albert
| Party | Candidate | Votes | % | ±% |
|---|---|---|---|---|
| New Democratic | Marie Renaud | 12,336 | 46.2% | -7.7% |
| United Conservative | Jeff Wedman | 10,682 | 40.0% | -0.6% |
| Alberta Party | Barry Bailey | 2,817 | 10.6% | +8.4% |
| Liberal | Kevin McLean | 317 | 1.2% | -2.2% |
| Green | Cameron Jefferies | 229 | 0.9% | -- |
| Independence | Sheldon Gron | 172 | 0.6% | -- |
| Alberta Advantage | Donald Petruka | 139 | 0.5% | -- |
| Total valid votes | | 26,692 | | |
| Rejected, spoiled, and declined | | 108 | 55 | 8 |
| Registered electors and turnout | | 38,353 | 69.9% | |
| New Democratic hold | | Swing | | % |
Source(s) "2019 Provincial General Election Results". Elections Alberta.

=== 2015 general election ===
2015 Alberta general election: St. Albert
| Party | Candidate | Votes | % |
|---|---|---|---|
| New Democratic | Marie Renaud | 12,219 | 53.9 |
| Progressive Conservative | Stephen Khan | 6,343 | 28.0 |
| Wildrose | Shelley Biermanski | 2,854 | 12.6 |
| Liberal | Bill Alton | 778 | 3.4 |
| Alberta Party | Trevor Love | 492 | 2.2 |
