= Sandra Jansen =

Canadian politician and journalist

The Honourable Sandra Jansen ECA

Minister of Infrastructure
- In office October 17, 2017 – April 30, 2019
- Premier: Rachel Notley
- Preceded by: Brian Mason
- Succeeded by: Prasad Panda

Associate Minister of Family and Community Safety
- In office August 1, 2013 – September 15, 2014
- Premier: Alison Redford; Dave Hancock
- Preceded by: Position established
- Succeeded by: Position abolished

Member of the Legislative Assembly of Alberta for Calgary-North West
- In office April 23, 2012 – April 16, 2019
- Preceded by: Lindsay Blackett
- Succeeded by: Sonya Savage

Personal details
- Born: 1963 or 1964 (age 61–62) Edmonton, Alberta, Canada
- Party: New Democratic (2016–present)
- Other political affiliations: Progressive Conservative (2011–2016) Ontario Liberal (2025 - Present)
- Children: 1
- Profession: Politician; journalist

Sandra Jansen ECA (born c. 1963) is a Canadian politician who was a member of the Legislative Assembly of Alberta representing the electoral district of Calgary-North West. She served as the Minister of Infrastructure between October 2017 and April 2019.

== Early career ==
Jansen's first experience in politics was with the Ron Ghitter campaign for the leadership of the Progressive Conservatives in 1985, alongside Alison Redford. Soon after, Jansen began a 25-year career in television broadcast journalism – first at CHAT-TV in Medicine Hat, then at CICT-DT in Calgary, then in Montreal. Her career apex was in the late 1990s at CTV NewsNet/CTV News Channel in Toronto as one of their anchors. In the mid-2000s Jansen left Toronto to return to Calgary, anchoring the nightly news for Citytv Calgary.

In 2007, Jansen left journalism to obtain a master's degree in professional communications, graduating in 2009. This degree led her back into Alberta provincial politics, when in autumn 2011 Jansen was hired by incoming Premier Alison Redford to be part of Redford's communications team.

== Legislative assembly ==
Jansen was first elected to the legislative assembly in the 2012 provincial election as a Progressive Conservative. She was named an associate minister on July 26, 2013, and sworn in on August 1, 2013 in the position of Minister of Family and Community Safety. Jansen addressed many issues, including human trafficking, violence against women and child exploitation. Jansen has also previously served as a member of the Standing Committee on Families and Communities, Standing Committee on Privileges and Elections, and chair of the Calgary caucus.

As the newly elected MLA of Calgary-North West, Jansen spearheaded many initiatives including rallying the importance of a new middle school in the community of Rocky Ridge/Royal Oak to then Education Minister, Jeff Johnson. The prospective school had been dropped from second to seventh place on the priority list of schools produced by the Calgary Board of Education in 2012. After successfully demonstrating the need of constituents in the Calgary North-West community, the provincial government announced on May 1, 2013, that Rocky Ridge/Royal Oak would receive a new middle school, planned to open in fall 2016.

Jansen also played a pivotal role in stopping an urban drilling site, proposed by Kaiser Exploration Ltd, where four oil wells were planned to be drilled within 400 metres of the northwest residential community of Royal Oak. Jansen successfully expressed to legislature that current drilling policies do not take into account high-density areas. After meetings with then Energy Minister, Ken Hughes, Jansen and Hughes discussed the importance of appropriate urban drilling policies for all Albertans, which takes into account air and water quality, pollution, and appropriate emergency evacuation routes. Jansen sponsored the urban drilling review motion, which was later passed in April 2013, to determine whether adequate policy was in place regarding urban community drilling sites. Jansen also successfully identified three possible alternative drilling locations. In October 2013, it was announced that Kaiser Exploration Ltd. would be moving its drilling sites 2.3 kilometres away.

Jansen left the PC caucus and joined the NDP caucus on November 17, 2016. The news was announced by a joint press release between Jansen and Alberta NDP Premier Rachel Notley. On October 17, 2017 Sandra Jansen became Alberta's first female Minister of Infrastructure. She was also a member of the Economic Development Policy Ministerial Committee and her most recent Legislative accomplishments include being responsible for creating Alberta's first disability advocate.

=== Leadership campaign ===
After the Progressive Conservative government was defeated in the 2015 provincial election, Jansen declared as a candidate for the leadership of the Alberta Progressive Conservative Party. She withdrew her candidacy in a letter to supporters on November 8, 2016, following the party's AGM, saying “I have never before experienced harassment like that which occurred up to and including this past weekend. Insults were scrawled on my nomination forms. Volunteers from another campaign chased me up and down the hall, attacking me for protecting women’s reproductive rights, and my team was jeered for supporting children’s rights to a safe school environment.”

=== Floorcrossing ===
Nine days after dropping out of the Alberta PC Leadership race, Jansen announced she was crossing the floor to sit with Rachel Notley's NDP Government. Her crossing the floor has led to multiple instances of abuse aimed at her. More specifically, Jansen's gender was attacked by those displeased with her crossing the floor. In late November 2016, Jansen read out the insults she had received via social media in the Alberta Legislature, leading to the widespread condemning of such sexist insults against Canadian female politicians.

After joining the NDP, Jansen co-sponsored Bill 2 (2017), which would extend the period of time that a victim of sexual assault or domestic violence may choose to bring legal action, and introduced Private Members' Bill 205 (2017), which would create a new disabled persons' advocacy position in Alberta's government. On October 17, 2017, she was appointed to cabinet as minister of Infrastructure.

In January 2019, Jansen announced that she had chosen not to run for re-election in the 2019 Alberta general election.

In March 2025, Jansen became chief of staff to Ontario Liberal leader Bonnie Crombie.

== Cabinet positions ==
Alberta provincial government of Rachel Notley
Cabinet post (1)
Predecessor	Office	Successor
Brian Mason	Minister of Infrastructure; October 17, 2017–April 30, 2019	Prasad Panda
Alberta provincial government of Dave Hancock
Cabinet post (1)
Predecessor	Office	Successor
cont'd from Redford Ministry	Associate Minister of Family and Community Safety; March 23, 2014 – September 15, 2014	Position Abolished
Alberta provincial government of Alison Redford
Cabinet post (1)
Predecessor	Office	Successor
Position Established	Associate Minister of Family and Community Safety; August 1, 2013 – March 23, 2014	cont'd into Hancock Ministry

== Electoral history ==
2012 Alberta general election: Calgary-North West
Party	Candidate	Votes	%
Progressive Conservative	Sandra Jansen	7,683	51.76%
Wildrose	Chris Challis	5,454	36.74%
Liberal	Robert Prcic	992	6.68%
New Democratic	Brian Malkinson	471	3.17%
Evergreen	Bryan Hunt	140	0.94%
Alberta Party	Troy Millington	103	0.69%

2015 Alberta general election: Calgary-North West
Party	Candidate	Votes	%
Progressive Conservative	Sandra Jansen	6,320	32.72
New Democratic	Karen Mills	5,724	29.63
Wildrose	Jeff Callaway	5,163	26.73
Alberta Party	Chris Blatch	1,176	6.09
Liberal	Neil Marion	935	4.84
Total valid votes		19,318	100.0
Rejected, spoiled and declined		127	
Turnout		19,445	57.3
Eligible voters		33,952	
Source: Elections Alberta
