= Stephen Khan =

Canadian politician (born 1966/67)

The Honourable Stephen Khan ECA

Member of the Legislative Assembly of Alberta for St. Albert
- In office April 23, 2012 – May 5, 2015
- Preceded by: Ken Allred
- Succeeded by: Marie Renaud

Personal details
- Born: 1966 or 1967 (age 59–60)
- Party: Alberta Party
- Other political affiliations: Progressive Conservative (former)
- Education: University of Alberta
- Occupation: businessman

Stephen M. Khan ECA (born 1966 or 1967) is a Canadian politician who was an elected member to the Legislative Assembly of Alberta representing the electoral district of St. Albert. He was a member of the Progressive Conservative caucus. He was minister responsible for Service Alberta in the cabinet of Jim Prentice.

He was defeated by Marie Renaud of the New Democrats in the 2015 Alberta general election.

He later joined the Alberta Party.

== Electoral history ==
2015 Alberta general election: St. Albert
Party	Candidate	Votes	%
New Democratic	Marie Renaud	12,219	53.9
Progressive Conservative	Stephen Khan	6,343	28.0
Wildrose	Shelley Biermanski	2,854	12.6
Liberal	Bill Alton	778	3.4
Alberta Party	Trevor Love	492	2.2

2012 Alberta general election: St. Albert
Party	Candidate	Votes	%
Progressive Conservative	Stephen Khan	10,481	53.76
Wildrose	James Burrows	4,130	21.18
Liberal	Kim Bugeaud	2,011	10.31
New Democratic	Nicole Bownes	1,679	8.61
Alberta Party	Tim Osborne	1,195	6.13
