= Lois Mitchell =

Lieutenant Governor of Alberta from 2015 to 2020

The Honourable Lois Mitchell CM AOE
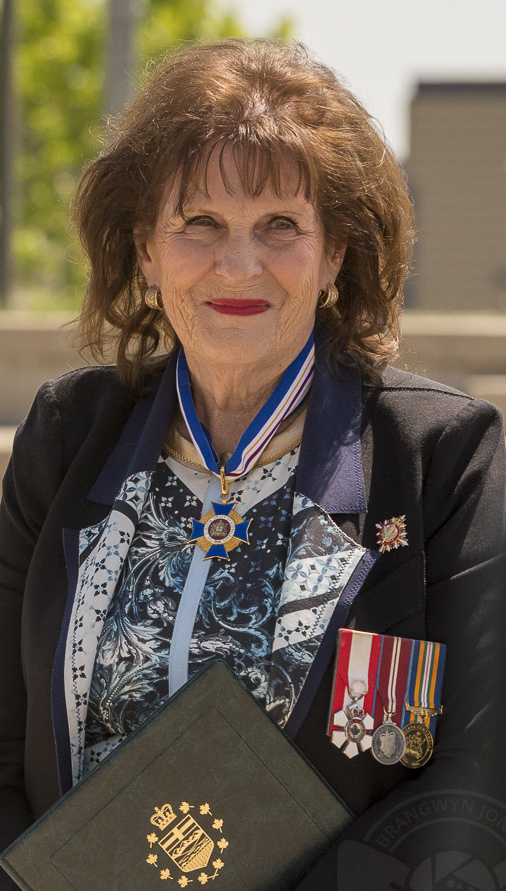
- Mitchell in 2019

18th Lieutenant Governor of Alberta
- In office June 12, 2015 – August 26, 2020
- Monarch: Elizabeth II
- Governors General: David Johnston; Julie Payette
- Premier: Rachel Notley; Jason Kenney
- Preceded by: Donald Ethell
- Succeeded by: Salma Lakhani

Personal details
- Born: Lois Elizabeth Boulding; June 22, 1939 (age 87) Vancouver, British Columbia, Canada
- Spouse: Doug Mitchell (m. 1961; died 2022)
- Children: 4
- Education: University of British Columbia
- Profession: businesswoman, philanthropist consultant, organizer

Lois Elizabeth Mitchell CM AOE (née Boulding; June 22, 1939) is a Canadian businesswoman and philanthropist who was the 18th lieutenant governor of Alberta from 2015 to 2020. Her appointment as the lieutenant governor was made by Governor General of Canada David Lloyd Johnston on the Constitutional advice of Prime Minister of Canada Stephen Harper, effective June 12, 2015. A former teacher and founder of a consulting firm, Mitchell is also a longtime organizer of events and active volunteer in the Calgary community, along with her late husband, Doug Mitchell.

== Career ==
Mitchell was born on June 22, 1939 and raised in Vancouver. She attended the University of British Columbia and studied physical education, graduating around 1961. She later worked as a teacher in British Columbia for two years before moving to Calgary. She is the founder of and a senior partner at Rainmaker Global Business Development, a marketing and consulting firm based in Calgary, and the president of Amherst Consultants.

Considered one of the most prominent people in Calgary, she is also a member of the boards of directors of UBS Bank Canada, Mitacs and Canada World Youth, the governor of the Canadian Women's Hockey Association, a co-founder of the Global Business Forum, and one of twelve founders of Crime Stoppers Calgary. She has also been a board member of the Calgary Chamber of Commerce (also a former chair), International Institute for Olympic, Paralympic and Sport Pedagogy, Special Olympic Foundation, Calgary Philharmonic Orchestra, and Hockey Canada Foundation. Mitchell also is the chair of the Latin American Research Centre at the University of Calgary and in 1997 was named an honorary consul of Colombia to Alberta by the Colombian ambassador to Canada. She and her husband, Doug, donated to and organized many hockey and sport-related events.

The Doug and Lois Mitchell Outstanding Calgary Artist Award was established in 2012 from contributions from her and her husband. She established the Hayley Wickenheiser Thunderbird Ice Hockey Endowment in 2007 to support the UBC Women's Ice Hockey team.

== Lieutenant governor ==
On May 20, 2015, Mitchell was appointed by Governor General of Canada David Johnston on the advice of Prime Minister Stephen Harper to be lieutenant governor of Alberta, replacing Donald Ethell. She was sworn in on June 12. As the viceregal representative in Alberta, she is styled "Her Honour" while in office and has the style "the Honourable" for life.

== Personal life ==
She was appointed to the Order of Canada in 2012 when she also received the Queen Elizabeth II Diamond Jubilee Medal. In 1998, she won the Calgary Women of Distinction Award and, in 2008, she was named Citizen of the Year by the City of Calgary. She was married to Douglas Mitchell, whom she met while at school in British Columbia, from 1961 until Doug's death in 2022. Doug was a lawyer, a Canadian football player in his youth, and later a commissioner of the Canadian Football League. They had four children: two daughters and two sons. Her grandfather, Tom Mackie, served as the chief of the Calgary Police Service from 1909 to 1912. She is of Scottish heritage.

== Arms ==
Coat of arms of Lois Mitchell
Crest A garden wall Azure masoned Argent its portal irradiated Proper doors open Azure flanked by two roses Gules slipped barbed and seeded Proper. Escutcheon Azure on a saltire Argent surmounted by a bezant charged with two hockey sticks in saltire Sable four eighth notes Sable. Supporters Two mares Proper each crined unguled and collared Or pendent therefrom a bezant charged with a football palewise Azure standing on a grassy mount Vert issuant from waves Azure crested Argent. Motto Love Truth Courage
