= Alberta Intergovernmental Relations =

International and Intergovernment Relations
Agency overview
- Formed: 2 September 1972; 53 years ago
- Jurisdiction: Province of Alberta
- Agency executive: Danielle Smith, Minister

Alberta Intergovernmental Relations (or the Ministry of Intergovernment Relations) is the Alberta provincial ministry for international relations and relations with the Canadian federal government and the other provincial governments in Canada. Since 2014, it has been held concurrently by the Premier of Alberta. It was formerly called Alberta International and Intergovernmental Relations

== Ministers ==
- Shirley McClellan, Progressive Conservative (26 May 1999 – 16 March 2001)
- Halvar Jonson, Progressive Conservative (16 March 2001 – 25 November 2004)
- Ed Stelmach, Progressive Conservative (25 November 2004 – 23 March 2006)
- Gary Mar, Progressive Conservative (6 April 2006 – 15 December 2006)
- Guy Boutilier, Progressive Conservative (15 December 2006 – 12 March 2008) (Note: Has held one or more Ministry seats; within the time of being the Alberta International and Intergovernmental Relations Minister)
- Ron Stevens, Progressive Conservative (12 March 2008 – 15 May 2009)
- Vacant, under Progressive Conservative Government (15 May 2009 – 17 September 2009; 125 Days)
- Len Webber, Progressive Conservative (17 September 2009 – 15 January 2010)
- Iris Evans, Progressive Conservative (15 January 2010 – 12 October 2011)
- Cal Dallas, Progressive Conservative (12 October 2011 – 15 September 15 2014)
- Jim Prentice, Progressive Conservative (15 September 2014 – 24 May 2015)
- Rachel Notley, New Democratic (24 May 2015 – 30 April 2019)
- Jason Kenney, United Conservative Party (30 April 2019 – 11 October 2022)
- Danielle Smith, United Conservative Party (11 October 2022 - present)

== Envoys to the United States ==
Alberta's envoys to the United States manage the important relationship between Alberta and the US from the Alberta Washington Office within the Canadian embassy. Currently, Gitane De Silva serves as envoy to the United States, or officially as "Senior Representative to the United States". She has held the position since 1 January 2016, taking over from Rob Merrifield, who was appointed as the envoy in September 2014. Previously, Gary Mar has also been envoy to the US, he was appointed 27 September 2007. He resigned the post on 16 March 2011 to contest the provincial Conservative party leadership and later became Alberta's envoy to Asia.

== Offices abroad ==
Through the ministry, Alberta maintains offices and provincial envoys at the Canadian embassies or consulates in Washington, D.C., Chicago, Shanghai, Beijing, Hong Kong, Taipei, Berlin, Mexico City, London, Seoul and Tokyo.

== See also ==
- Foreign relations of Canada
- Ontario Ministry of Intergovernmental Affairs
- Quebec Ministry of International Relations
- Saskatchewan Ministry of Intergovernmental Affairs
