= Mike Ellis (Canadian politician) =

Canadian politician

The Honourable Mike Ellis ECA MLA
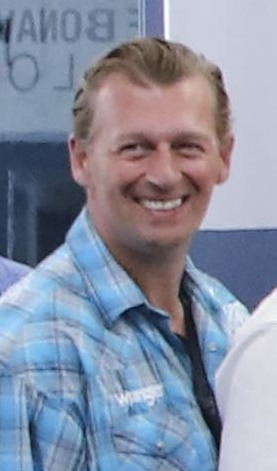
- Ellis in 2018

Deputy Premier of Alberta
- Incumbent
- Assumed office June 9, 2023
- Premier: Danielle Smith
- Preceded by: Nathan Neudorf; Kaycee Madu

Minister of Public Safety and Emergency Services
- Incumbent
- Assumed office October 24, 2022
- Premier: Danielle Smith
- Preceded by: Office created

Member of the Legislative Assembly of Alberta for Calgary-West
- Incumbent
- Assumed office October 27, 2014
- Preceded by: Ken Hughes

Deputy Leader of the United Conservative Party
- In office July 25, 2017 – October 30, 2017
- Leader: Nathan Cooper; Jason Kenney
- Preceded by: Office created
- Succeeded by: Leela Aheer

Personal details
- Born: January 9, 1973 (age 53) Calgary, Alberta
- Party: United Conservative
- Other party: Progressive Conservative (until 2017)
- Occupation: Politician; police officer

Michael George Ellis ECA MLA (born January 9, 1973) is a Canadian politician who has represented Calgary-West in the Legislative Assembly of Alberta since 2014, sitting as a member of the Progressive Conservatives and later the United Conservative Party (UCP). Ellis was sworn in as Deputy Premier and Minister of Public Safety and Emergency Services in Alberta. Prior to entering politics, he worked as a police officer.

== Background ==
Ellis was born and raised in Calgary, where he was a police sergeant with the Calgary Police Service between 2003 and 2015.

He is married with three children.

== Political career ==
Ellis was first elected to the Legislative Assembly of Alberta in a by-election on October 27, 2014, as a Progressive Conservative (PC). He was re-elected in the 2015, 2019, and 2023 provincial elections and has also been the government whip.

He had previously challenged his predecessor, Ken Hughes, in a nomination contest in the same district for the 2012 Alberta general election,

Premier Jason Kenney named Ellis as Associate Minister of Mental Health and Addictions in a 2021 cabinet shuffle.

=== Minister of Public Safety and Emergency Services ===
Ellis was appointed Minister of Public Safety and Emergency Services by Premier Danielle Smith on October 24, 2022, upon Smith's victory of the 2022 United Conservative Party leadership election.

In December 2022 Ellis updated the Alberta Police Act to include an independent committee that handles complaints made towards police.

Ellis has introduced plans to have police carry mandatory body cams.

Ellis gave the Alberta Law Enforcement Response Teams (ALERT) $4.4 million to combat gang and gun violence.

Ellis supported Danielle Smith during her leadership bid, saying she shared his "values for improving public safety."

During the 2023 Alberta general election, Ellis joined the far-right Rebel News' hosts Ezra Levant and Sheila Gunn Reid for their live-coverage of the event. Ellis continued as Minister of Public Safety and Emergency Services in the June 2023 cabinet shuffle. In April 2025, the National Police Federation and RCMP Deputy Commissioner Rob Hill said that comments made by Ellis in the Legislative Assembly about the state of rural policing misled the public.

=== Deputy Premier of Alberta ===
Following the defeat of Kaycee Madu in the 2023 Alberta general election and the cabinet reshuffling of Nathan Neudorf, Ellis was sworn in as the sole Deputy Premier of Alberta on June 9, 2023, replacing both Madu and Neudorf, who had served jointly as Deputy Premier of Alberta under Premier Danielle Smith from October 24, 2022 until June 9, 2023.

== Election results ==
2023 Alberta general election: Calgary-West
Party	Candidate	Votes	%	±%
United Conservative	Mike Ellis	12,793	56.67	-9.44
New Democratic	Joan Chand'oiseau	9,468	41.94	+16.48
Green	Jason McKee	313	1.39	–
Total		22,574	99.15	–
Rejected and declined		193	0.85	
Turnout		22,767	66.25	
Eligible voters		34,363		
United Conservative hold		Swing		-12.96
Source(s) Source: Elections Alberta

2019 Alberta general election: Calgary-West
Party	Candidate	Votes	%	±%
United Conservative	Mike Ellis	14,974	66.11	-6.08
New Democratic	Gulshan Akter	5,768	25.47	-2.34
Alberta Party	Frank Penkala	1,610	7.11	–
Liberal	Yasna Oluic-Kovacevic	298	1.32	–
Total		22,651	–	–
Rejected, spoiled and declined		65	40	6
Eligible electors / turnout		32,570	69.76%	13.25%
United Conservative hold		Swing		
Source(s) Source: "26 - Calgary-West, 2019 Alberta general election". officialresults.elections.ab.ca. Elections Alberta.

2015 Alberta general election: Calgary-West
Party	Candidate	Votes	%	±%
Progressive Conservative	Mike Ellis	8,312	46.79%	2.50%
New Democratic	Mizanur Rahman	4,940	27.81%	24.72%
Wildrose	Gerard Lucyshyn	4,512	25.40%	-16.18%
Total		17,764	–	–
Rejected, spoiled and declined		75	20	22
Eligible electors / turnout		31,604	56.51%	20.78%
Progressive Conservative hold		Swing		
Source(s) Source: "27 - Calgary-West, 2015 Alberta general election". officialresults.elections.ab.ca. Elections Alberta.

Alberta provincial by-election, October 27, 2014: Calgary-West Resignation of Ken Hughes on September 26, 2014
Party	Candidate	Votes	%	±%
Progressive Conservative	Mike Ellis	4,836	44.29	−5.56
Wildrose	Sheila Taylor	4,530	41.58	+4.25
Liberal	David Khan	927	8.51	+1.05
New Democratic	Brian Malkinson	337	3.09	+0.08
Alberta Party	Troy Millington	264	2.42	+1.45
Total		10,894	—	—
Rejected, spoiled and declined		17	7	1
Eligible electors / turnout		30,541	35.73	—
Progressive Conservative hold		Swing		−
Source(s) Alberta. Chief Electoral Officer (2015). Report on the October 27, 2014 By-elections in: Calgary-Elbow, Calgary-Foothills, Calgary-West, Edmonton-Whitemud (PDF) (Report). Edmonton: Legislative Assembly of Alberta; Chief Electoral Officer. ISBN 978-098653678-6.
