= Executive Council of Alberta =

Body that leads the executive branch of Alberta

- Coat of arms of Alberta
- Nickname: Cabinet of Alberta
- Formation: September 1, 1905 (121 years ago)
- Members: Lieutenant governor of Alberta; Premier of Alberta; Ministers of the Crown
- Monarch: Charles III
- Represented by: Salma Lakhani, Lieutenant Governor
- Chair: Danielle Smith, Premier
- Staff: Government of Alberta
- Website: www.alberta.ca/executive-council

The Executive Council of Alberta (the Cabinet) is a body of ministers of the Crown in right of Alberta, who along with the lieutenant governor, exercises the powers of the Government of Alberta. Ministers are selected by the premier and typically (but not always) sit as a member of the Legislative Assembly (MLA). It is the provincial equivalent to the federal Cabinet of Canada.

== Honorifics ==
Executive councillors are styled "the Honourable". A change was made to the protocol in 2022 and former members who were living on February 6, 2022 (the Platinum Jubilee of Elizabeth II) are now honorary members of the council and are styled "the Honourable" for life (unless removed from membership for an indictable offence). Members and honorary members use the post-nominal letters "ECA".

== Role ==
The executive powers in the province lie with the lieutenant governor and are exercised on the advice of the premier and Executive Council. The lieutenant governor is restricted by custom and constitutional convention. The lieutenant governor performs constitutional, ceremonial and social duties. The lieutenant governor is Salma Lakhani, sworn in on August 26, 2020, and the premier is Danielle Smith, sworn in on October 11, 2022.

== Membership ==
The Executive Council is similar in structure and role to the Cabinet of Canada. As federal and provincial responsibilities differ there are a number of different portfolios between the federal and provincial governments.

The lieutenant governor, as representative of the King of Canada, heads the council, and actions of the council are said to be done by the Governor-in-Council. Other members of the Cabinet, who advise, or minister to, the vice-regal representative, are selected by the premier and appointed by the lieutenant governor. Most cabinet ministers are the head of a ministry, but this is not always the case. In the construct of constitutional monarchy and responsible government, the ministerial advice tendered is typically binding (although the royal prerogative belongs to the Crown, not to any of the ministers) and ministers account to the Legislative Assembly for their portfolios.

=== Current executive council ===
The current cabinet has been in place since May 21, 2026.

Portfolio	Minister	Took office
Premier of Alberta and Minister of Intergovernmental Relations	Danielle Smith	October 11, 2022
Deputy Premier of Alberta and Minister of Public Safety and Emergency Services	Mike Ellis	June 9, 2023
Minister of Infrastructure	Martin Long	February 27, 2025
Minister of Finance and President of Treasury Board	Jason Nixon	May 21, 2026
Minister of Jobs, Economy and Trade	Matt Jones	June 9, 2023
Minister of Justice	Mickey Amery	June 9, 2023
Minister of Hospital and Surgical Health Services	Adriana LaGrange	May 21, 2026
Minister of Primary and Preventive Health Services	Justin Wright	May 21, 2026
Minister of Energy and Minerals	Brian Jean	June 9, 2023
Minister of Tourism and Sport	Joseph Schow	June 9, 2023
Minister of Environment and Protected Areas	Grant Hunter	January 2, 2026
Minister of Technology and Innovation	Nate Glubish	October 21, 2022
Minister of Affordability and Utilities	RJ Sigurdson	May 21, 2026
Minister of Municipal Affairs	Dan Williams	May 16, 2025
Minister of Transportation and Economic Corridors	Devin Dreeshen	October 21, 2022
Minister of Agriculture and Irrigation	Tara Sawyer	May 21, 2026
Minister of Forestry and Parks	Todd Loewen	June 9, 2023
Minister of Immigration and Multiculturalism	Muhammad Yaseen	June 9, 2023
Minister of Education	Demetrios Nicolaides	June 9, 2023
Minister of Advanced Education	Rajan Sawhney	June 9, 2023
Minister of Service Alberta and Red Tape Reduction	Dale Nally	October 21, 2022
Minister of Indigenous Relations	Rajan Sawhney	May 16, 2025
Minister of Assisted Living and Social Services	Nathan Neudorf	May 21, 2026
Minister of Children and Family Services	Searle Turton	June 9, 2023
Minister of Mental Health and Addiction	Rick Wilson	May 16, 2025
Minister of Arts, Culture, and the Status of Women	Tanya Fir	June 9, 2023

== Former Cabinets ==
- Klein Ministry (1992–2006)
- Stelmach Ministry (2006–2011)
- Redford Ministry (2011–2014)
- Hancock Ministry (2014–2014)
- Prentice Ministry (2014–2015)
- Notley Ministry (2015–2019)
- Kenney Ministry (2019–2022)

== See also ==
- List of premiers of Alberta
- List of Alberta general elections
- Politics of Canada
- Council of the Federation
- List of Alberta provincial ministers
