= Dave Hancock =

Premier of Alberta in 2014

The Honourable Dave Hancock ECA KC
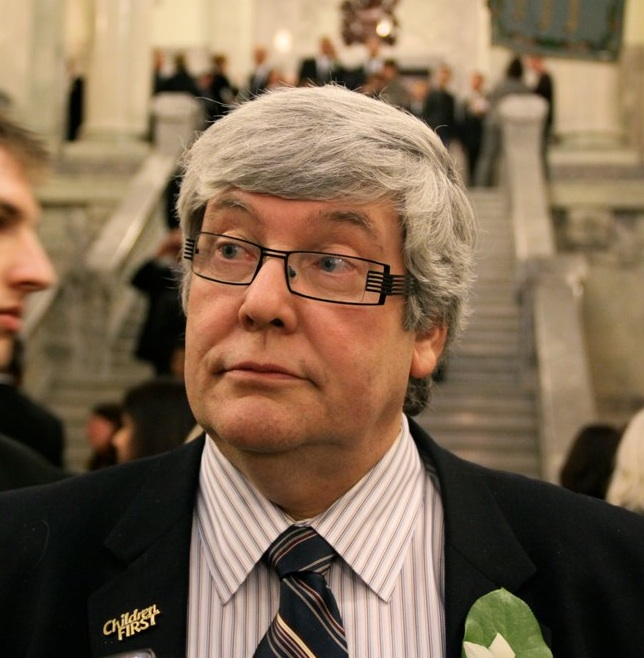
- Hancock in 2011

15th Premier of Alberta
- In office March 23, 2014 – September 15, 2014
- Monarch: Elizabeth II
- Lieutenant Governor: Donald Ethell
- Preceded by: Alison Redford
- Succeeded by: Jim Prentice

Deputy Premier of Alberta
- In office December 6, 2013 – March 20, 2014
- Premier: Alison Redford
- Preceded by: Thomas Lukaszuk
- Succeeded by: Sarah Hoffman (2016)

Leader of the Progressive Conservative Association of Alberta
- Interim; March 20, 2014 – September 6, 2014
- Preceded by: Alison Redford
- Succeeded by: Jim Prentice
Alberta Executive Council
Minister of Advanced Education
In office December 6, 2013 – September 15, 2014
Premier	Alison Redford; Himself
Preceded by	Thomas Lukaszuk
Succeeded by	Don Scott
In office November 25, 2004 – April 5, 2006
Premier	Ralph Klein
Preceded by	Lyle Oberg (Learning)
Succeeded by	Denis Herard (Advanced Education and Technology)
Minister of Human Services
In office October 12, 2011 – December 13, 2013
Premier	Alison Redford
Preceded by	Position established
Succeeded by	Manmeet Bhullar
Minister of Education
In office March 12, 2008 – October 12, 2011
Premier	Ed Stelmach
Preceded by	Ron Liepert
Succeeded by	Thomas Lukaszuk
Minister of Health and Wellness
In office December 15, 2006 – March 12, 2008
Premier	Ed Stelmach
Preceded by	Iris Evans
Succeeded by	Ron Liepert
Minister of Justice and Attorney General
In office May 26, 1999 – November 25, 2004
Premier	Ralph Klein
Preceded by	Jon Havelock
Succeeded by	Ron Stevens
Minister of Intergovernmental and Aboriginal Affairs
In office March 29, 1997 – May 26, 1999
Premier	Ralph Klein
Preceded by	Ken Rostad
Succeeded by	Shirley McClellan

Member of the Alberta Legislative Assembly for Edmonton-Whitemud
- In office March 11, 1997 – September 25, 2014
- Preceded by: Mike Percy
- Succeeded by: Stephen Mandel

Personal details
- Born: David Graeme Hancock; August 10, 1955 (age 71) Fort Resolution, Northwest Territories, Canada
- Party: Progressive Conservative
- Spouse: Janet
- Children: 3
- Education: University of Alberta
- Occupation: Lawyer

David Graeme Hancock ECA KC (born August 10, 1955) is a Canadian politician and lawyer who served as the 15th premier of Alberta from March to September 2014. Since 2017, he has served as a judge of the Provincial Court of Alberta. A member of the Progressive Conservative Party, he served as a member of the Legislative Assembly of Alberta (MLA) representing electoral district of Edmonton-Whitemud from 1997 to 2014.

== Early life and education ==
Hancock was born August 10, 1955, in Fort Resolution, Northwest Territories, grew up in Hazelton, British Columbia, went to high school in Fort Vermilion, Alberta before moving to Edmonton in 1972. He went to the University of Alberta for his undergraduate degree in Political Science and graduated in 1975, He was a member of the Phi Gamma Delta fraternity at University of Alberta.

== Political career ==
=== Premier of Alberta ===
Following the announcement of Alison Redford's resignation as both leader of the Progressive Conservative Party and premier, he was named interim party leader by the Progressive Conservative caucus on March 20, 2014, and, with such confidence from the majority of the legislature, was appointed as Premier of Alberta. Hancock was sworn in at Government House on March 23, 2014.

Hancock was succeeded as Premier and PC party leader by Jim Prentice on September 15, 2014. He also retired from the legislature on the same day. He is the shortest serving premier in the province's history. Hancock's official portrait as Premier was unveiled on February 13, 2017. Hancock joked at the ceremony saying that his premiership was "the best summer job that I've ever had", and that he expected his portrait to be "one the size of a postage stamp" based on the short length of his administration. Other politicians in attendance paid tribute to Hancock's long hours in the legislature to pass legislation, and his lengthy tenure in government holding eight cabinet portfolios.

== Personal life ==
Hancock lives in Edmonton with his wife Janet, who was the principal at Lillian Osborne High School in Edmonton until 2018. He has three children.

== Electoral history ==
2004 Alberta general election: Edmonton-Whitemud
Party	Candidate	Votes	%	±%
Progressive Conservative	Dave Hancock	7,494	46.13%	−12.15
Liberal	Donna Smith	6,568	40.43%	+5.40
New Democratic	Brian Fleck	1,639	10.09%	+3.75
Alberta Alliance	Kathy Rayner	471	2.90%	
Independent	John Andrews	74	0.45%	
Total		16,246		
Rejected, spoiled, and declined		89		
Eligible electors / turnout		30,949	52.77%	
Progressive Conservative hold		Swing		−8.78
"Edmonton-Whitemud Statement of Official Results 2004 Alberta general election" (PDF). Elections Alberta.
