= Donald Ethell =

17th Lieutenant Governor of Alberta

Colonel the Honourable Donald Ethell OC OMM MSC AOE CD
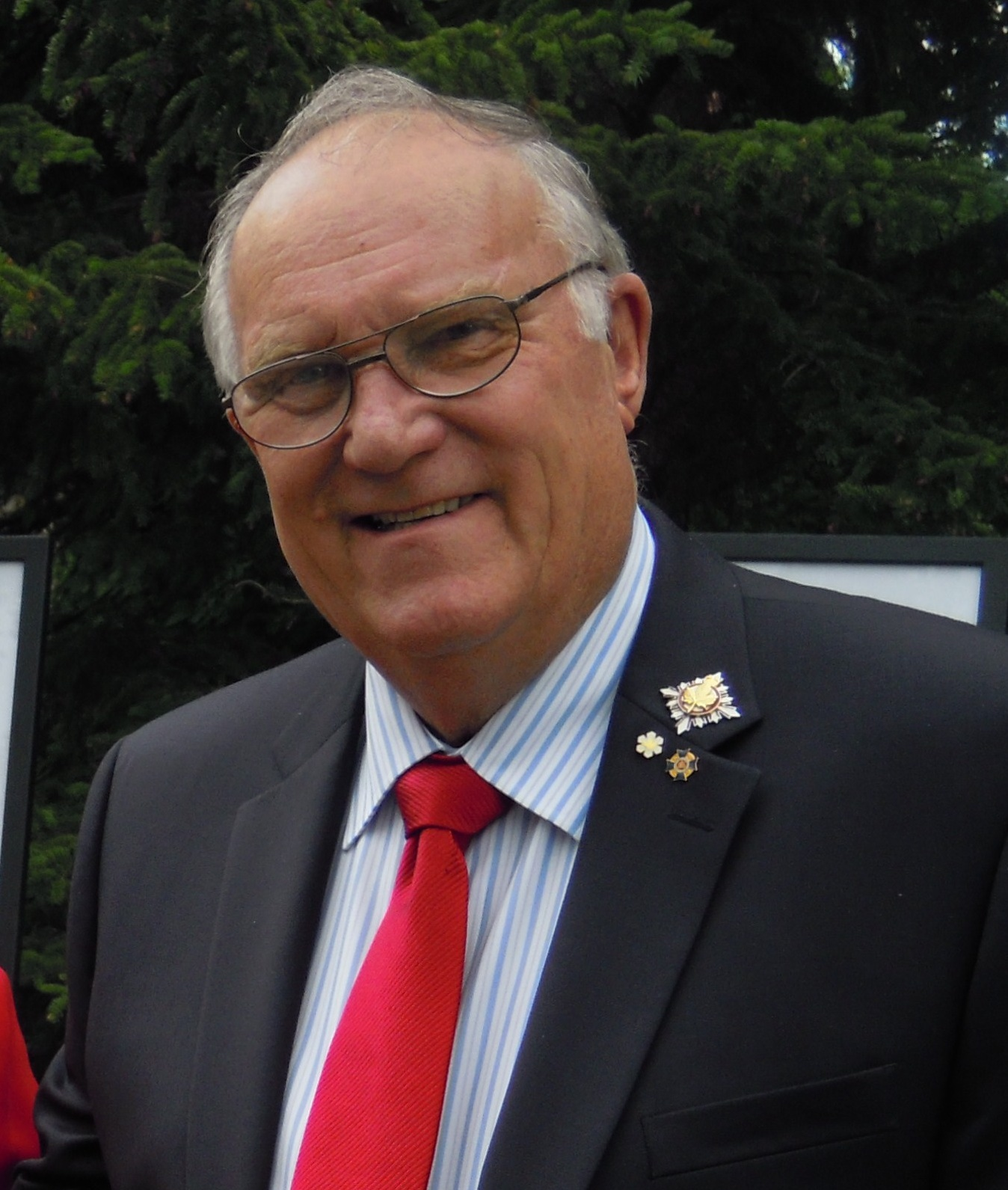
- Ethell in 2010

17th Lieutenant Governor of Alberta
- In office May 11, 2010 – June 12, 2015
- Monarch: Elizabeth II
- Governors General: Michaëlle Jean; David Johnston
- Premier: Ed Stelmach; Alison Redford; Dave Hancock; Jim Prentice; Rachel Notley
- Preceded by: Norman Kwong
- Succeeded by: Lois Mitchell

Personal details
- Born: Donald Stewart Ethell; July 23, 1937 (age 89) Vancouver, British Columbia, Canada
- Spouse: Linda Ethell
- Profession: Soldier

Military service
- Allegiance: Canada
- Branch/service: Canadian Army
- Years of service: 1955–1993
- Rank: Colonel

Donald Stewart Ethell OC OMM AOE MSC CD (born July 23, 1937) is a retired Canadian Army colonel and was the 17th lieutenant governor of Alberta from 2010 to 2015.

== Career ==
Ethell was born in Vancouver, British Columbia, in 1937, the son of a nurse and a navy chief petty officer. He enlisted in the Canadian Army in 1955 after being rejected by the Navy and rejected from the Air Force.

Ethell enlisted as a rifleman in the Queen's Own Rifles of Canada at the age of 17 and underwent basic training at the Currie Barracks in Calgary. He served in West Germany during the Cold War and rebadged to Princess Patricia's Canadian Light Infantry in 1970 when the Queen's Own Rifles of Canada was removed from regular army service. He rose through the non-commissioned officer ranks to warrant officer until he was commissioned as an officer in 1972.

Demonstrating an ability for leadership, Ethell steadily rose to the rank of colonel. He successively became a veteran of 14 international peacekeeping deployments, with service in Cyprus, Lebanon, Syria, Jordan, Egypt, Israel, Central America and the Balkans. Following his military retirement in 1993, Ethell became involved in humanitarian efforts, including CARE Canada.

He is an officer in the Order of Canada and the Order of Military Merit and a member of the Alberta Order of Excellence.

== Lieutenant governor ==
On April 8, 2010, Prime Minister Stephen Harper announced his appointment as the next Lieutenant Governor of Alberta. He was installed on May 11, 2010. He was made a Knight of Justice in the Venerable Order of Saint John on September 11, 2010, and installed as vice prior of the order's Alberta Council.

As the viceregal representative in Alberta, he was styled "His Honour" while in office and has the right to the style "the Honourable" for life. He succeeded Norman Kwong.

During his time as Lieutenant Governor, Ethell swore in each of Alison Redford, Dave Hancock, and Jim Prentice as Premier of Alberta. Rachel Notley was sworn in on his behalf by Catherine Fraser, the Chief Justice of Alberta, as Ethell was recovering from back surgery.

== Arms ==
Coat of arms of Donald Ethell
Adopted June 15, 2011 Crest An umbrella thorn acacia tree Proper. Escutcheon Or two swords in saltire Bleu Céleste hilted Azure between four infantry helmets Bleu Céleste a chief dancetty Azure. Supporters Two lions per fess Or and Azure. Compartment A grassy mount set with poppy flowers Proper. Motto Duty And Service Above All Orders The ribbon of the Order of Canada: Desiderantes meliorem patriam "(They desire a better country)". The insignia of a Companion of the Order of Canada, Officer of the Order of Military Merit and Member of the Alberta Order of Excellence Symbolism Blue and yellow are the provincial colours of Alberta, as well as the national colours of Sweden, His Honour’s ancestral country. The crossed swords symbolize infantry and thus mark His Honour’s military career with the Queen’s Own Rifles and Princess Patricia's Canadian Light Infantry. The four helmets represent a formation of soldiers, the light blue colour indicating United Nations peacekeepers, marking the fact that His Honour was deployed on 14 international peacekeeping missions. The upper section refers to the mountains of Alberta, especially the Three Sisters mountains near Canmore, and also to His Honour’s love of mountain climbing. The umbrella thorn acacia tree is characteristic of the African savannah, and it is also found in the Middle East. It therefore alludes to His Honour’s work with development agencies in Africa after his retirement from the Canadian Forces, and to the peacekeeping missions in the Middle East for which he was deployed. This type of tree is notable for its large canopy, its hardiness and the variety of uses to which its products can be put. It can therefore serve as a metaphor for aiding and protecting others. The lions refer to His Honour’s sign of the Zodiac, Leo. The grassy base indicates the foothills of the Rocky Mountains, a reference to His Honour’s home in Calgary. The poppies symbolize his involvement in veterans’ organizations.

Order of precedence
Preceded by Catherine Fraser, The Chief Justice of The Court of Appeal of Alberta	Order of precedence in Alberta as of 2020	Succeeded by Lois Mitchell, Former Lieutenant Governor of Alberta
