= 2017 Progressive Conservative Association of Alberta leadership election =

- Date: March 18, 2017
- Convention: Telus Convention Centre, Calgary, Alberta
- Resigning leader: Jim Prentice
- Won by: Jason Kenney
- Ballots: 1
- Candidates: 3
- Entrance fee: $30,000 (non refundable) + $20,000 compliance bond (refundable)
- Spending limit: None

The 2017 Progressive Conservative Association of Alberta leadership election was held on March 18, 2017, in Calgary. It chose Jason Kenney as the successor to former Alberta Premier and Progressive Conservative Association of Alberta leader Jim Prentice. He resigned after the party was defeated in the May 5, 2015 general election. The party had governed the province for 44 consecutive years. Prentice had been elected leader eight months prior to his defeat.

On May 11, 2015, the remaining nine members of the party's caucus elected Ric McIver as interim leader.

According to the party's constitution, a leadership election was to be held within six months of a vacancy occurring; in this case within six months of May 5, 2015 when Prentice announced his resignation. However, the party's board of directors decided to delay the convention and, at its 2016 AGM, decided to hold the next leadership election between August 2016 and May 2017. The party's board of directors later decided to hold the election in the spring of 2017.

== Campaign spending ==
Kenney spent $1.46 million on his leadership campaign, nearly nine times the $162,603 spent by his closet rival, Richard Starke. Stephen Khan spent $24,919 on the campaign, while Byron Nelson spent $15,579.

== Rules ==
For the first time since 1985, the leader will be chosen by a delegated leadership convention rather than a One Member One Vote system in which all party members vote. Each of the 87 riding associations will elect 15 delegates to the convention. Five of those 15 spots are reserved for those serving as directors of the boards at those riding associations as of October 1, 2016, and three of the 15 delegates must be youth delegates (under age 26). All provincial board members of the party and former PC MLAs are automatic delegates. To win, a candidate must gain 50% +1 of votes cast. If no candidate wins a majority on the first ballot, the candidate with the lowest vote total is dropped from the next ballot. Balloting continues until one candidate wins a majority (or all other candidates have withdrawn).

Candidates must make financial disclosures of all pre and post-writ campaign activity, retroactive to June 30, 2016. Candidates must “avoid causing harm or disrepute to the PCAA and its brand through any detrimental action or conduct, whether intentional or unintentional”. All candidates will have to post a $20,000 performance bond — refundable if they comply with all the rules — in addition to the $30,000 non-refundable entrance fee. To be nominated, candidates are required to obtain signatures from 500 party members, 100 from each region (North, Central, South, Calgary, Edmonton).

The party has imposed no spending, donation, or fundraising limits, however, in the fall of 2016 provincial legislature is expected to consider a proposal to legislate a $300,000 spending limit on all leadership campaigns, regardless of party. It is unclear whether such a law would be made retroactive and apply to the current PC leadership election.

To be eligible to vote one must be a current party member at least 14 days prior to the Delegate Selection Meeting for the member's constituency.

== Timeline ==
- September 6, 2014 - Jim Prentice elected leader.
- May 5, 2015 - Progressive Conservatives defeated in 2015 provincial election losing office after 44 years in power. Party wins 10 seats, falling to third place behind the New Democratic Party of Alberta, which forms government, and the Wildrose Party, which remains the Official Opposition. Jim Prentice announces his immediate resignation as party leader and MLA.
- May 11, 2015 - Caucus chooses Ric McIver as interim leader.
- November 5, 2015 - original deadline by which a leadership election could be held according to the party's constitution.
- March 22, 2016 - Calgary-Greenway by-election to fill a vacancy caused by the death of PC MLA Manmeet Bhullar results in Prabhdeep Gill holding the riding for the party.
- May 7, 2016 - Progressive Conservative Association of Alberta AGM held in Red Deer; while 300 delegates had been expected, more than 1,000 delegates attended the meeting. The party decides to discontinue the One Member One Vote preferential ballot process used since the 1990s for choosing party leaders and to revert to a traditional delegated leadership convention in which each electoral district association elects delegates who, in turn, will attend a convention to elect the new leader. The party also decides to implement a 14-day "cooling off" period between purchasing a party membership and being able to vote for leadership convention delegates, in order to discourage the phenomenon of instant members. It is also decided to hold the leadership election sometime between August 2016 and May 2017, with a final date to be decided by the party's board of directors and to bar future interim leaders from running in leadership elections, a provision which will not apply retroactively to current interim leader Ric McIver who will be permitted to run for permanent leader.
- June 4, 2016 - The party's board of directors decides that the leadership election will be held in the spring of 2017; the exact date will be announced on June 30, 2016.
- October 1, 2016 - Official launch of leadership race in Lethbridge.
- November 5–6, 2016 - PC Alberta policy convention held in Red Deer.
  - November 5, 2016, 7-9 pm - Leadership forum at Red Deer Sheraton.
- November 8, 2016 - Sandra Jansen and Donna Kennedy-Glans withdraw.
- November 10, 2016 - Nomination deadline.
- November 16, 2016 - Delegate selection begins.
- December 8, 2016, 7-9 pm - Candidate town hall in Fort McMurray at Royal Canadian Legion, 9217 Huggard Street.
- January 15, 2017, 2-4 pm - Candidate debate in Edmonton at Maharaja Banquet Hall.
- January 26, 2017 - Wildrose Party leader Brian Jean announces he is willing to step down as party leader to run for the leadership of a new unified Wildrose-PC party.
- January 27, 2017 - Stephen Khan withdraws.
- February 16, 2017 - Final day Delegate Selection Meetings can be held.
- March 17–18, 2017 - Leadership convention to be held in Calgary at the Telus Convention Centre.
  - March 18, 2017 - Candidate speeches. 12:30 PM (MDT) voting begins for the first ballot.
    - Voting ends at 3:00 PM MDT, results of the first ballot announced at 4:30 MDT.
    - Jason Kenney captured the leadership on the first ballot

== Declared candidates ==
=== Jason Kenney ===
Background

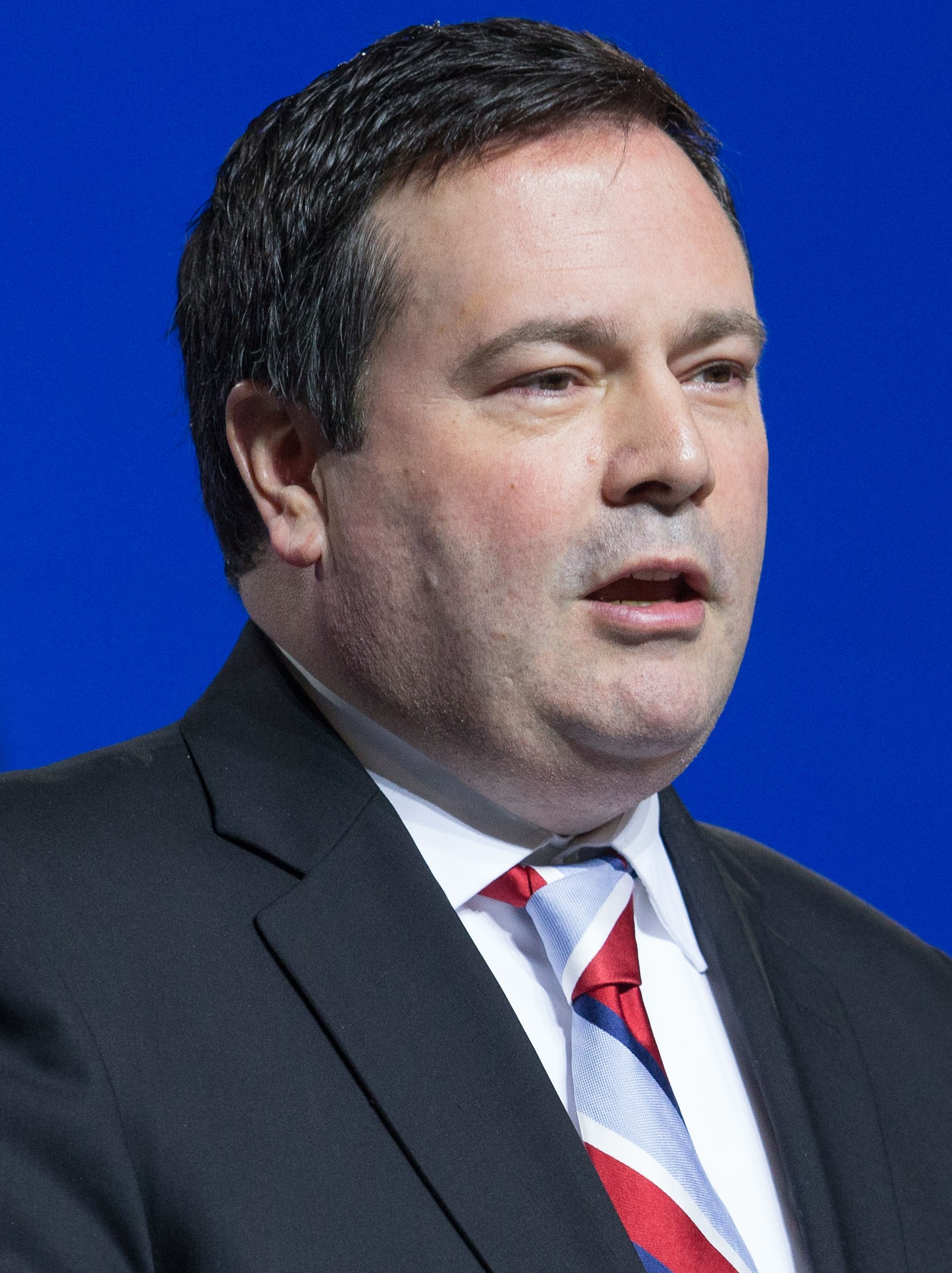
Jason Kenney, MP for Calgary Midnapore

Former Conservative Party of Canada MP for Calgary Midnapore, Alberta (2015–2016) and Calgary Southeast, Alberta (1997–2015), federal Minister of National Defence (2015), federal Minister for Multiculturalism (2013–2015), federal Minister of Employment and Social Development (2013–2015), Minister of Citizenship and Immigration (2008–2013). Previously a Reform Party and then Canadian Alliance MP. Kenney announced his leadership bid in a speech at a supporters' rally in a Calgary hotel on July 6, 2016, in the middle of the Calgary Stampede. The following day he held a media availability in which he announced further details of his campaign plan and took media questions. At the time, Kenney stated that he thought the name "'Conservative Party of Alberta' had potential". Former Prime Minister Stephen Harper announced his endorsement of Kenney's campaign on July 9 at his final Stampede BBQ in Calgary Heritage and interim Conservative Party leader Rona Ambrose announced her endorsement at the same event.

Date candidacy declared: July 6, 2016
Campaign website: https://web.archive.org/web/20170114165958/http://www.jasonkenney.ca/
Supporters
MLAs: (4) Mike Ellis (MLA for Calgary-West), Prab Gill (MLA for Calgary-Greenway), Richard Gotfried (MLA for Calgary-Fish Creek), Dave Rodney (MLA for Calgary-Lougheed)
Former MLAs: (7) Rob Anderson (MLA for Airdrie-Chestermere, 2008-2012, and Airdrie, 2012-2015), Heather Forsyth (MLA for Calgary-Fish Creek, 1993-2015), Shiraz Shariff (MLA for Calgary-McCall, 1995-2008), David Dorward (MLA for Edmonton-Gold Bar), Naresh Bhardwaj (MLA for Edmonton-Ellerslie), Wayne Cao (MLA for Calgary-Fort), Peter Sandhu (MLA for Edmonton-Manning), Jonathan Denis (MLA for Calgary-Acadia), Sohail Quadri (MLA for Edmonton-Mill Woods)
Federal politicians: (3) Rona Ambrose (MP for Sturgeon River—Parkland and Interim Conservative Party of Canada Leader, 2015-2017), Michael Cooper (MP for St. Albert—Edmonton), Chris Warkentin (MP for Grande Prairie-Mackenzie)
Former federal politicians: (2) Stephen Harper (Prime Minister of Canada, 2006-2015), Tim Uppal (MP for Edmonton—Sherwood Park, 2008-2015)
Other prominent supporters: (1) Kevin O'Leary (CEO, O'Leary Financial Group)
Organizations: (2) Alberta Can't Wait, Alberta Prosperity Fund
Policies: Advocates merging the Progressive Conservative and Wildrose parties.

=== Byron Nelson ===
Background

Byron Nelson, 45, is a Calgary father, lawyer and business owner, was the PC candidate in Calgary Bow in 2015 and is chair of the Shriners Hospitals for Children in Southern Alberta.

Date candidacy declared: September 27, 2016
Campaign website: http://www.byronforalberta.ca/
Supporters
MLAs:
Former MLAs:
Federal politicians:
Former federal politicians:
Other prominent supporters:
Organizations:
Policies: Fiscally conservative, advocates a "competitive" tax structure, as well as "quality" healthcare and education.

=== Richard Starke ===
Background

Starke is the Opposition House Leader (2015–2017) and MLA for Vermilion-Lloydminster (2012–2019). He was Minister of Tourism, Parks and Recreation (2013-2014) under premiers Alison Redford and Dave Hancock. He was a veterinarian before entering politics.

Date candidacy declared: September 29, 2016
Campaign website: http://richardstarke.ca/
Supporters
MLAs: (1) Wayne Drysdale (MLA for Grande Prairie-Wapiti, Minister of Transportation 2013-15, Minister of Infrastructure 2012-13 and 2014)
Former MLAs: (28) Mike Allen (Fort McMurray-Wood Buffalo 2012-15), Pearl Calahasen (Lesser Slave Lake 1989-2015, Minister 2001-06), Ron Casey (Banff-Cochrane 2012-15), Cal Dallas (Red Deer-South 2008-15, Minister 2011-14), Ray Danyluk (Lac La Biche-St. Paul 2001-12, Minister 2006-12), Arno Doerksen (Strathmore-Brooks 2008-12), Iris Evans (Sherwood Park, 1997-2012, Minister 1997-2011), Jacquie Fenske (Fort Saskatchewan-Vegreville 2012-15), Hon. Ron Ghitter (Calgary-Buffalo 1971-79, Federal Senator 1993-2000, 1985 leadership candidate), Hector Goudreau (Dunvegan-Central Peace-Notley 2001-15, Minister 2006-11), Doug Griffiths (Battle River-Wainwright 2002-15, Minister 2008-14), Jack Hayden (Drumheller-Stettler 2007-12, Minister 2008-12, Doug Horner (Spruce Grove-St. Albert 2001-15, Minister 2004-15), Jim Horsman (Medicine Hat-Redcliff 1975-1993, Minister 1979-92), LeRoy Johnson (Wetaskiwin-Camrose 1997-2008), Linda Johnson (Calgary-Glenmore 2012-15), Stephen Khan (St. Albert 2012-15), Minister 2015, withdrawn leadership candidate), Heather Klimchuk, Genia Leskiw, Rob Lougheed, Thomas Lukaszuk, Stephen Mandel (MLA for Edmonton-Whitemud 2014-15, Minister 2014-15, Mayor of Edmonton 2004-13), Cathy Olesen, Verlyn Olson, Bridget Pastoor, William Purdy (Stony Plain 1971-86), Dave Quest (Strathcona-Sherwood Park 2008-15, Associate Minister 2013-14), Teresa Woo-Paw (Calgary-Northern Hills 2008-15, Associate Minister 2012-15)
Federal politicians:
Former federal politicians:
Other prominent supporters:
Organizations:
Policies: To unite Alberta under a “progressive conservative banner, a centrist party which reflects their values and their principles.” Supports cooperation with Wildrose without a merger

== Withdrawn candidates ==
=== Sandra Jansen ===
Background

Opposition Critic for Education, Human Services and Status of Women (2015–2016), MLA for Calgary-North West (2012–2019), Minister of Family & Community Safety (2013–2014). Was a broadcaster prior to entering politics.

Date candidacy declared: October 12, 2016
Date candidacy withdrawn: November 8, 2016
Supporters
MLAs:
Former MLAs:
Federal politicians:
Former federal politicians:
Other prominent supporters: (1) Stephen Carter (Chief of Staff to the Premier of Alberta, 2011—2012)
Organizations:
Policies:
Notes: Withdrew in a letter to supporters on November 8, 2016, following the party's AGM saying “I have never before experienced harassment like that which occurred up to and including this past weekend. Insults were scrawled on my nomination forms. Volunteers from another campaign chased me up and down the hall, attacking me for protecting women’s reproductive rights, and my team was jeered for supporting children’s rights to a safe school environment.” Jansen crossed the floor to join the governing NDP on November 17, 2016.

=== Stephen Khan ===
Background

Minister responsible for Service Alberta (2015), former MLA for St. Albert (2012–2015)

Date candidacy declared: November 3, 2016
Date candidacy withdrawn: January 26, 2017
Supporters
MLAs:
Former MLAs:
Federal politicians:
Former federal politicians:
Other prominent supporters:
Organizations:
Policies: Ran as a moderate fiscal conservative and social progressive.
Notes: Withdrew claiming that his delegates had been intimidated and that he had been subjected to racist and Islamophobic abuse, for which he blamed Kenney's supporters. Khan has thrown his support to Starke.

=== Donna Kennedy-Glans ===
Background

MLA for Calgary Varsity (2012-2015), Associate Minister – Electricity and Renewable Energy (2013-2014)

Date candidacy declared: September 7, 2016
Date candidacy withdrawn: November 8, 2016
Supporters
MLAs:
Former MLAs: (1) Linda Johnson
Federal politicians:
Former federal politicians:
Other prominent supporters:
Organizations:
Policies: Running to "unite the middle".
Notes: Withdrew saying: “Right now, politics in Alberta is polarizing and there is limited opportunity for centrist voices to be heard.”

== Declined ==
- Rona Ambrose, Interim Leader of the Conservative Party of Canada and Leader of the Official Opposition (Canada) (2015–2017), MP for Sturgeon River—Parkland (2015–2017) and Edmonton—Spruce Grove, Alberta (2004–2015), federal Minister of Health (2013–2015), Minister of Public Works and Government Services (2010–2013), federal Minister of Labour (2008–2010), federal Minister of Intergovernmental Affairs (2007–2008), federal Minister of the Environment (2006–2007).
- Stephen Harper, Prime Minister of Canada (2006–2015), MP for Calgary Heritage (2002–2016) for the Conservative Party of Canada.
- Harman Kandola, PC candidate in Edmonton Ellerslie (2015), lawyer.
- Heather Klimchuk, Minister of Human Services (2014-2015), Minister of Culture and Community Services (2011-2014), and Minister of Service Alberta (2008-2011), MLA for Edmonton-Glenora (2008-2015).
- Thomas Lukaszuk, deputy premier (2012-2013) and MLA for Edmonton-Castle Downs (2001-2015), Minister of Employment and Immigration (2010-2011), Minister of Education (2011-2013), Minister of Enterprise and Advanced Education (2013), Minister of Jobs, Skills, Training and Labour (2013-2014), third-place finisher in 2014 leadership election. He was a high school teacher before entering politics.
- Stephen Mandel, former MLA for Edmonton-Whitemud (2014-2015), Minister of Health (2014-2015), Mayor of Edmonton (2004-2013).
- Ric McIver, interim leader, MLA for Calgary-Hays (2012–present), Minister of Transportation (2012-2013), Minister of Infrastructure (2013-2014), runner-up in the 2014 leadership election
- Diana McQueen, Minister of Municipal Affairs (2014–2015) and concurrently Minister for Climate Change (2015), Minister of Energy (2013–2014), Minister of Environment and Water (2011–2013), also Ministry of Sustainable Resource Development (2012–2013), MLA for Drayton Valley-Calmar (2008–2015), mayor of Drayton Valley (2001–2008).
- Michael Oshry, Edmonton city councillor for Ward 5 (2013–2017), co-founder of FIRMA Foreign Exchange.
- Doug Schweitzer, Calgary lawyer, former CEO of the Progressive Conservative Party of Manitoba, manager of Jim Prentice's 2014 leadership campaign.

Manmeet Bhullar, MLA for Calgary-Greenway since 2008 and former Minister of Service Alberta (2011-2013), former Minister of Human Services (2013-2015), had been considered a potential candidate until he was killed in a motor vehicle accident on November 23, 2015.

== Results ==
Balloting occurred on March 18, 2017, at the Telus Convention Centre. Kenney was declared the winner on the first ballot.

Candidate	Votes	Percentage
Jason Kenney	1,113	75.4%
Richard Starke	323	21.9%
Byron Nelson	40	2.7%
Total	1,476	100%

Spolied ballots: 3

== See also ==
- Progressive Conservative Association of Alberta leadership elections
