= Myles McDougall =

Canadian politician from Alberta

The Honourable Myles McDougall ECA MLA

Minister of Advanced Education
- Incumbent
- Assumed office May 16, 2025
- Premier: Danielle Smith
- Preceded by: Rajan Sawhney

MLA for Calgary-Fish Creek
- Incumbent
- Assumed office May 29, 2023
- Preceded by: Richard Gotfried

Personal details
- Party: UCP

Myles McDougall is a Canadian politician from the United Conservative Party. He was elected as a Member of the Legislative Assembly of Alberta for Calgary-Fish Creek in the 2023 Alberta general election. On May 16, 2025, McDougall was appointed Minister of Advanced Education.

During his election in 2023, McDougall apologized for saying black Canadians live in "ghetto culture" and that "the same issue avoidance is present in dealing with our First Nations in Canada.”

== Personal life ==
McDougall has lived internationally, including in Argentina, where he met his wife, Patricia, who is currently an elementary school teacher in Calgary. Together, they have a son who attends the University of Calgary.

== Electoral history ==
2023 Alberta general election: Calgary-Fish Creek
Party	Candidate	Votes	%	±%
United Conservative	Myles McDougall	13,743	53.77	-7.76
New Democratic	Rebecca Bounsall	11,254	44.03	+15.24
Liberal	Charlie Heater	378	1.48	+0.10
Solidarity Movement	Dave Hughes	186	0.73	–
Total		25,561	99.24	–
Rejected and declined		195	0.76	
Turnout		25,756	69.48	
Eligible voters		37,067		
United Conservative hold		Swing		-11.50
Source(s) Source: Elections Alberta

== Nomination contests ==
UCP Calgary-Fish Creek nomination contest: February 23, 2023

Candidate	Round 1		Round 2	
Candidate	Votes	%	Votes	%
Myles McDougall	591	46.9	743	63.3
Dave Guenter	376	29.8	430	36.7
Christina Steed	293	23.3	Eliminated	
Total	1,260	100.0	1,173	100.0
