= Nagwan Al-Guneid =

Canadian politician

Nagwan Al-Guneid MLA

Member of the Legislative Assembly of Alberta for Calgary-Glenmore
- Incumbent
- Assumed office May 29, 2023
- Preceded by: Whitney Issik

Personal details
- Born: 1984 or 1985 (age 41–42) Taiz, Yemen
- Party: Alberta New Democratic Party
- Education: University of Calgary

Nagwan Al-Guneid (born 12 November 1984) is a Canadian politician from the Alberta New Democratic Party.

== Education ==
Al-Guneid graduated from the University of Calgary with an undergraduate degree in communications and a master's degree in sustainable development.

== Career ==
She has spent much of her career working in the energy industry sector, like many Albertans starting in the oil and gas sector. Immediately prior to her election, Al-Guneid served as the director of the Business Renewables Centre Canada. Al-Guneid was also appointed to the City of Calgary's biodiversity advisory committee by Calgary City Council, where she counselled the government between 2016 and 2019. In 2022, Calgary's Avenue magazine named her part of their Top 40 Under 40 2022.

After the 2023 Alberta general election, she was elected the member of the Legislative Assembly of Alberta for Calgary-Glenmore. She defeated incumbent United Conservative Party MLA Whitney Issik. As of June 21, 2024, she serves as the Official Opposition critic for Energy and Minerals.

On September 25, 2026 Al-Guneid announced she wouldn't seek another term to represent Calgary-Glenmore

== Personal life ==
Al-Guneid speaks English, French, and Arabic. She is a wife and mother to two young sons.

== Electoral history ==
2023 Alberta general election: Calgary-Glenmore
Party	Candidate	Votes	%	±%
New Democratic	Nagwan Al-Guneid	12,681	49.26	+17.25
United Conservative	Whitney Issik	12,639	49.10	-6.54
Green	Steven Maffioli	423	1.64	+0.46
Total		25,743	99.00	–
Rejected and declined		260	1.00	
Turnout		26,003	70.17	
Eligible electors		37,058		
New Democratic gain from United Conservative		Swing		+11.90
Source(s) Source: Elections Alberta
