= Whitney Issik =

Canadian politician

The Honourable Whitney Issik ECA

Member of the Legislative Assembly of Alberta for Calgary-Glenmore
- In office April 16, 2019 – May 29, 2023
- Premier: Jason Kenney
- Preceded by: Anam Kazim
- Succeeded by: Nagwan Al-Guneid

Minister of Environment and Parks
- In office June 21, 2022 – June 9, 2023
- Premier: Jason Kenney, Danielle Smith
- Preceded by: Jason Nixon
- Succeeded by: Rebecca Schulz

Personal details
- Party: United Conservative Party
- Education: University of Calgary

Whitney Issik is a Canadian politician who was elected in the 2019 Alberta general election to represent the electoral district of Calgary-Glenmore in the 30th Alberta Legislature. She also played Canadian football for the Calgary Rage. Whitney ran for re-election in the 2023 provincial election but was defeated.

Issik was on the Economy and Affordability Cabinet Policy Committee, Standing Committee on the Alberta Heritage Savings Trust Fund and the Standing Committee on Resource Stewardship. She held the roles of Government Whip, Associate Minister of Status of Women as well as Minister of Environment and Parks.

Prior to being elected Issik played Canadian football for the Calgary Rage in the Western Women's Canadian Football League. She also holds a bachelor's degree from the University of Calgary and has owned and operated a small business.

As Associate Minister of Status of Women, Issik sponsored Bill 14, the Provincial Court (Sexual Assault Awareness Training) Amendment Act which required lawyers wishing to be appointed to provincial court judges to take sexual assault law training and social context before applying.

She also announced $6 million in funding to help support women entrepreneurs.

== Electoral history ==
2023 Alberta general election: Calgary-Glenmore
Party	Candidate	Votes	%	±%
New Democratic	Nagwan Al-Guneid	12,681	49.26	+17.25
United Conservative	Whitney Issik	12,639	49.10	-6.54
Green	Steven Maffioli	423	1.64	+0.46
Total		25,743	99.00	–
Rejected and declined		260	1.00	
Turnout		26,003	70.17	
Eligible electors		37,058		
New Democratic gain from United Conservative		Swing		+11.90
Source(s) Source: Elections Alberta

2019 Alberta general election: Calgary-Glenmore
Party	Candidate	Votes	%	±%	Expenditures
United Conservative	Whitney Issik	14,565	55.64%	-1.42%	$62,782
New Democratic	Jordan Stein	8,379	32.01%	-1.18%	$15,470
Alberta Party	Scott Appleby	2,217	8.47%	5.07%	$10,305
Liberal	Shirley Ksienski	424	1.62%	-4.74%	$3,129
Green	Allie Tulick	311	1.19%	–	$3,709
Freedom Conservative	Dejan Ristic	159	0.61%	–	$500
Alberta Independence	Rafael Krukowski	123	0.47%	–	$739
Total		26,178	–	–	
Rejected, spoiled and declined		86	57	7	
Eligible electors / turnout		36,691	71.60%	14.31%	
United Conservative gain from New Democratic		Swing		11.80%	
Source(s) Source: Elections Alberta Note: Expenses is the sum of "Election Expenses", "Other Expenses" and "Transfers Issued". The Elections Act limits "Election Expenses" to $50,000.
