= Ray Kingsmith =

Canadian politician & curler (1927–1988)

Raymond Arthur Kingsmith (June 28, 1927 – May 3, 1988) was a politician and curler from Alberta, Canada. He was instrumental in helping curling become an Olympic sport.

Kingsmith was born in Queenstown, Alberta, to George and Clara. He moved to Calgary in 1944, and worked for Cominco for 42 years, retiring in 1987. He was educated at Garbutt College in Calgary, where he received a business diploma.

== Politics ==
Kingsmith ran for a seat in the Legislative Assembly of Alberta in the 1971 Alberta general election for the Social Credit Party. He decided to take on incumbent Bill Dickie in Calgary-Glenmore who had crossed the floor two years earlier from the Liberals to the Progressive Conservatives. Dickie won re-election easily, Kingsmith finished second out of the three fielded candidates taking 35% of the vote.

== Curling ==
Kingsmith curled competitively from 1955 to 1964, but was never on a team that could make it out of zone playdowns. After his competitive career, he moved to the organizational aspect of the game.

Kingsmith served as president of the Canadian Curling Association from 1983 to 1984, served as president of the Calgary Curling Club and the Southern Alberta Curling Association from 1966 to 1967. He was co-chairman of the 1987 Canadian Olympic Curling Trials and served as volunteer-chairman for the curling tournament at the 1988 Winter Olympics. He was inducted in 1983 to the Alberta Sports Hall of Fame under the curling category. He was inducted into the Canadian Curling Hall of Fame in 1986 and 1994 under the builder category.

He died of lung cancer at Rockyview Hospital in Calgary in 1988 at the age of 60. Kingsmith was posthumously awarded the World Curling Freytag Award in 2011, and was inducted into the WCF Hall of Fame the next year.

The Kingsmith Memorial Golf Tournament is named in his honour and held annually to raise money for a scholarship in his name. In addition to curling, Kingsmith was a little league baseball coach, umpire and administrator.

== Personal life ==
He was married to Nancy, and had four children.
