= Hugh Planche =

Canadian politician (1931–2024)

The Honourable Hugh Planche ECA

Member of the Legislative Assembly of Alberta
- In office March 25, 1975 – May 8, 1986
- Preceded by: Bill Dickie
- Succeeded by: Dianne Mirosh
- Constituency: Calgary-Glenmore

Minister of Economic Development
- In office October 1, 1979 – May 1986
- Preceded by: Hugh Horner
- Succeeded by: Larry Shaben

Personal details
- Born: October 3, 1931 Calgary, Alberta, Canada
- Died: December 15, 2024 (aged 93) Calgary, Alberta, Canada

Hugh Lakin Planche ECA (October 3, 1931 – December 15, 2024) was a Canadian politician from the province of Alberta. He served as a Member of the Legislative Assembly of Alberta from 1975 to 1986. During his time in office he served as a member of the Executive Council of Alberta as Minister of Economic Development in the Peter Lougheed government from 1979 to 1986.

== Political career ==
Planche ran for a seat to the Alberta Legislature for the first time in the 1975 Alberta general election. He won a landslide majority and defeated Liberal leader Nicholas Taylor to hold the electoral district of Calgary-Glenmore for the Progressive Conservatives.

Planche would run for a second term in the 1979 Alberta general election. His popular vote would take a significant hit as he lost just over 10% from the 1975 election. Nick Taylor would also make big gains in his second run against Planche. Planche still held his seat with a solid majority of the vote. After the election on October 1, 1979, Premier Peter Lougheed appointed Planche Minister of Economic Development.

Planche ran for his third and final term in the 1982 Alberta general election. With his ministerial advantage he rolled up a massive majority taking nearly 80% of the popular vote. Planche retired at dissolution of the legislature in 1986. Planche died at the age of 93 on December 15, 2024, in Calgary.
