= Dianne Mirosh =

Canadian politician

Dianne Mirosh is a former provincial level politician from Calgary, Alberta, Canada. She served as a member of the Legislative Assembly of Alberta from 1986 to 1997. During her time in office, she served a number of cabinet portfolios in the Don Getty and Ralph Klein governments. Dianne currently commits her time to a blind/deaf youth summer camp program, located in British Columbia.

== Political career ==
Mirosh was elected to the Alberta Legislature in the 1986 Alberta general election. She won the electoral district of Calgary-Glenmore, defeating three other candidates to hold it for the Progressive Conservative Party. The race saw a strong challenge by Independent candidate Lois Cummings, who finished a strong second. Mirosh was re-elected in the 1989 Alberta general election. She was nearly defeated by Liberal candidate Brendan Dunphy, who finished approximately 600 votes behind Mirosh.

Dunphy and Mirosh faced each other again in the 1993 Alberta general election. Mirosh won the hotly contested race with 7972 votes to Dunphy's 7064. There were four other candidates on the ballot, but they all trailed far behind in popularity. On September 15, 1994, Premier Ralph Klein appointed Mirosh as the Minister of Science and Research, with responsibility to oversee the provincial government's newly created Science and Research authority.

Mirosh did not run for a fourth term in office, and retired at dissolution of the Legislature in 1997.

Legislative Assembly of Alberta
Preceded by Hugh Planche	MLA Calgary-Glenmore; 1986-1997	Succeeded by Ron Stevens
