= Ron Stevens =

Canadian politician

MLA for Calgary-Glenmore
- In office March 11, 1997 – May 15, 2009
- Preceded by: Dianne Mirosh
- Succeeded by: Paul Hinman

6th Deputy Premier of Alberta
- In office June 22, 2007 – May 15, 2009
- Preceded by: Shirley McClellan
- Succeeded by: Doug Horner

Minister of International and Intergovernmental Relations in the Alberta government
- In office March 12, 2008 – May 15, 2009
- Preceded by: Guy Boutilier
- Succeeded by: Len Webber

Minister of Justice and Attorney General in the Alberta government
- In office November 25, 2004 – March 12, 2008
- Preceded by: Dave Hancock
- Succeeded by: Alison Redford

Minister of Gaming in the Alberta government
- In office March 16, 2001 – November 25, 2004
- Preceded by: Murray Smith
- Succeeded by: Gordon Graydon

Personal details
- Born: Ronald Gordon Stevens; September 17, 1949 Empress, Alberta
- Died: May 13, 2014 (aged 64) Calgary, Alberta
- Party: Progressive Conservative
- Spouse: Phyllis
- Education: University of Calgary; University of Alberta
- Occupation: lawyer

Ronald Gordon "Ron" Stevens QC (September 17, 1949 – May 13, 2014) was a Canadian politician. He was a member of the Legislative Assembly of Alberta representing the constituency of Calgary-Glenmore as a Progressive Conservative until his resignation on May 15, 2009. He was subsequently appointed a Judge of the Court of Queen's Bench of Alberta on May 20, 2009, by the government of Canada.

== Early life ==
Stevens was born September 17, 1949, in Empress, Alberta. He graduated from the University of Calgary in 1971 with a Bachelor of Arts degree in political science and went on to obtain a Bachelor of Laws degree in 1975 from the University of Alberta. Before being elected to the Legislative Assembly of Alberta, Stevens worked as a civil litigation lawyer and mediator with a major law firm in Calgary. In 1996, he was appointed Queen's Council.

An active community member, Stevens served in the role of president of the Palliser Bayview Pumphill Community Association, director of the Community Mediation Calgary Society, director of the Federation of Calgary Communities, and director and vice chair of the Calgary Housing Authority.

== Political career ==
Stevens first sought public office in the 1997 provincial election in the constituency of Calgary-Glenmore. In that election, he received 58% of the vote. In the 2001 provincial election that followed, Stevens was re-elected with 68% of the popular vote. That same year, he was appointed by Premier Ralph Klein as Minister of Gaming and was responsible for the Alberta Gaming and Liquor Commission and the Alberta Lottery Fund. Following the 2004 provincial election, where he received 50% of the vote, Stevens was sworn in as Minister of Justice and Attorney General. On June 27, 2007, he was named Alberta's Deputy Premier by newly elected Premier Ed Stelmach. In the 2008 provincial election, Stevens was elected for a fourth time receiving 51% of the vote. On March 12, 2008, he was sworn in as Minister of International and Intergovernmental Relations.

Stevens served in a variety of capacities on numerous boards and committees. He held the title of Deputy Government House Leader, the position of chair for the Legislative Review Committee, the Oil Sands Ministerial Strategy Committee (Radke Report), the Health Information Legislation Committee, the Standing Policy Committee on Learning, the Private Schools Funding Task Force, the Non-Profit Tax Exemption Review Committee, the position of vice chair of the Agenda and Priorities Committee and the Standing Policy Committee on Justice and Government Services, and the position of deputy chair of the Select Special Freedom of Information and Protection of Privacy Act Review Committee.

Stevens also served as a member of the Treasury Board, the Agenda and Priorities Committee, and the Privileges and Elections, Standing Orders and Printing Committee.

As an MLA, Stevens successfully sponsored two governmental bills: the Holocaust Memorial Day and Genocide Remembrance Act and the Irrigation Districts Act. He also sponsored one private member's bill during his first term in office: the Emblems of Alberta (Alberta Dress Tartan) Amendment Act, 2000.

=== Hawaiian Stopover Controversy ===
In October 2007, CBC News Calgary reported that Ron Stevens had used his government credit card to pay for drinks and meals for his wife and four other people while on a stopover in Hawaii in 2003. At the time, Stevens was serving as Alberta's Gaming Minister. His three-day Hawaiian stopover occurred as he was returning from Australia where he had been studying that country's gaming system. "I don't recall whether it was a three-day stop or not," Stevens told CBC when questioned about the trip. "But I do recall that we did it in that fashion because it was less expensive than flying business class. In other words, it was the most [economical] way of doing it."

== Personal life ==
Stevens was married to Phyllis. The couple had two children together. He died of natural causes on May 13, 2014, at the age of 64.

== Election results ==
2008 Alberta general election results ( Calgary-Glenmore )		Turnout 45.6%	
Affiliation	Candidate	Votes	%
Progressive Conservative	Ron Stevens	6,441	51%
Liberal	Avalon Roberts	4,175	33%
Wildrose Alliance	Ryan Sadler	1,019	8%
Green	Arden Duncan Bonokoski	547	4%
New Democratic	Holly Heffernan	478	4%
2004 Alberta general election results ( Calgary-Glenmore )		Turnout 48.4%	
Affiliation	Candidate	Votes	%
Progressive Conservative	Ron Stevens	6,263	50.5%
Liberal	Avalon Roberts	4,364	35.2%
Alberta Alliance	Ernest McCutcheon	571	4.6%
Green	Evan Sklarski	532	4.3%
New Democratic	Holly Heffernan	553	4.5%
Social Credit	Larry Heather	127	1.0%
2001 Alberta general election results ( Calgary-Glenmore )		Turnout 60.6%	
Affiliation	Candidate	Votes	%
Progressive Conservative	Ron Stevens	9,678	67.7%
Liberal	Michael Broadhurst	3,708	25.9%
New Democratic	Jennifer Stewart	441	3.1%
Green	James A. Kohut	467	3.3%
1997 Alberta general election results ( Calgary-Glenmore )		Turnout 59.6%	
Affiliation	Candidate	Votes	%
Progressive Conservative	Ron Stevens	8,247	58.1%
Liberal	Wayne Stewart	4,919	34.7%
New Democratic	Grace Johner	435	3.1%
Social Credit	Vernon Cook	583	4.1%
