= Bill Dickie (politician) =

Canadian politician (1925–2019)

William "Bill" Daniel Dickie

City of Calgary Alderman
- In office October 23, 1961 – October 19, 1964

Member of the Legislative Assembly of Alberta
- In office June 17, 1963 – March 25, 1975
- Preceded by: Ernest Watkins
- Succeeded by: Hugh Planche
- Constituency: Calgary Glenmore

Minister of Mines and Minerals
- In office September 10, 1971 – March 1975
- Premier: Peter Lougheed
- Preceded by: Allen Patrick
- Succeeded by: Portfolio abolished

Personal details
- Born: August 13, 1925 Calgary, Alberta, Canada
- Died: May 23, 2019 (aged 93) Calgary, Alberta, Canada
- Party: Liberal; Progressive Conservative
- Occupation: lawyer and politician

William Daniel Dickie (August 13, 1925 – May 23, 2019) was a politician from Alberta, Canada. He served on Calgary city council from 1961 to 1964 and in the Legislative Assembly of Alberta from 1963 to 1975. He served as a cabinet minister in the government of Peter Lougheed from 1971 to 1975.

== Early life ==
Dickie began practicing corporate law in 1951. He laid the legal framework for the first Canadian company to be listed on the American Stock Exchange.

== Political career ==
Dickie served on Calgary city council from 1961 to 1964. While still serving on council he ran for a seat in the Alberta Legislature in the 1963 general election, as a candidate for the Alberta Liberal party in the electoral district of Calgary Glenmore. He won the seat from the Progressive Conservatives, whose candidate was Ned Corrigal, a broadcaster for CFAC radio. He was re-elected with a smaller share of the popular vote in the 1967 general election. On November 23, 1969, after being persuaded by Peter Lougheed, he left the Liberals and joined the Progressive Conservative caucus. He had been the last Liberal in the legislature; the party would not have another MLA until 1986.

In the 1971 Alberta general election Dickie won with 56% of the popular vote against Social Credit candidate and famous Alberta curler Ray Kingsmith. After the election Premier Lougheed appointed Dickie the Minister of Mines and Minerals. He held that portfolio until he retired from the legislature at dissolution in 1975. Dickie died on May 23, 2019, at the age of 93.
