= Calgary-Glenmore =

Provincial electoral district in Alberta, Canada

Alberta electoral district
- Calgary-Glenmore within the City of Calgary, 2017 boundaries

Provincial electoral district
- Legislature: Legislative Assembly of Alberta
MLA
Nagwan Al-Guneid
New Democratic
- District created: 1957
- First contested: 1959
- Last contested: 2023

Calgary-Glenmore, styled Calgary Glenmore from 1957 to 1971, is a provincial electoral district in Calgary, Alberta, Canada. The district is mandated to return a single member to the Legislative Assembly of Alberta.

The electoral riding of Calgary Glenmore is one of two original Calgary ridings of the seven that still survives from the 1959 redistribution of the Calgary riding. This riding covers the mid-southwest portion of Calgary and contains the neighbourhoods of Bayview, Braeside, Cedarbrae, Chinook Park, Eagle Ridge, Glenmore Park, Kelvin Grove, Lakeview, Palliser, Pump Hill, Oakridge, Woodbine, and Woodlands. The riding is named after the Glenmore Reservoir.

== History ==
The Alberta government decided to return to using the first past the post system of voting from Single Transferable Vote for the 1959 general election. The province redistributed the Calgary and Edmonton super riding's and standardized the voting system across the province.

Calgary-Glenmore was one of the six electoral districts created that year. The others were Calgary Bowness, Calgary Centre, Calgary West, Calgary North, Calgary North East, Calgary South East.

The 2010 boundary redistribution saw Calgary-Glenmore lose the neighbourhood of Southwood south of Southland Drive. It gained the neighbourhoods of Chinook Park, Kelvin Grove, Kingsland, North Glenmore Park, and Lakeview up to Glenmore Trail.

=== Boundary history ===
Calgary Glenmore 1957 boundaries
Bordering districts
| North | East | West | South |
|---|---|---|---|
| Calgary West | Calgary Centre, Calgary South East | Banff-Cochrane | Banff-Cochrane |
Legal description from the Statutes of Alberta 1957, An Act to amend The Legislative Assembly Act.
| riding map goes here | | map in relation to other districts in Calgary goes here | |
"Electoral Division of Calgary Glenmore, the boundary whereof is as follows: Commencing at the intersection of the centre lines of Seventeenth Avenue South West and Centre Street in the City of Calgary; thence southerly along the centre line of Centre Street to the left bank of the Elbow River; thence in a generally south-westerly direction along the said left bank to its most southerly intersection with the centre line of Fourth Street West in the City of Calgary; thence southerly along the centre line of Fourth Street West and of the road allowance east of section 28, township 23, range 1, west of the fifth meridian; thence westerly along the north boundaries of sections 21 and 20 and the north-east quarter of section 19 in the said township to the left bank of the Elbow River; thence in a generally westerly direction along the said left bank to the meridian between ranges 1 and 2, west of the fifth meridian between ranges 1 and 2 to the north-east corner of section 36, township 23, range 2, west of the fifth meridian; thence easterly along the north boundary of section 31, township 23 range 1 west of the fifth meridian, to the centre line of Twenty-fourth Street West in the City of Calgary; thence northerly along the said centre line of Twenty-fourth Street West to the centre line of Thirty-fourth Avenue South West in the said city; thence easterly along the said centre line of Thirty-fourth Avenue South West to the centre line of Fourteenth Street West in the said city; thence northerly along the said centre line of Fourteenth Street West to the centre line of Seventeenth Avenue South West aforesaid; thence easterly along the centre line of Seventeenth Avenue Southwest to the point of commencement.
Note: Boundaries never came into use and were amended in 1959.

Calgary Glenmore 1959 boundaries
Bordering districts
| North | East | West | South |
|---|---|---|---|
| Calgary West | Calgary Centre, Calgary South East | Banff-Cochrane | Banff-Cochrane |
| riding map goes here | | map in relation to other districts in Calgary goes here | |
Legal description from the Statutes of Alberta 1959, Legislative Assembly Act.
Electoral Division of Calgary Glenmore, the boundary whereof is as follows: Commencing at the intersection of the centre lines of Seventeenth Avenue South West and Centre Street in the City of Calgary; thence southerly along the centre line of Centre Street to the left bank of the Elbow River; thence in a generally south-westerly direction along the said left bank to its most southerly intersection with the centre line of Fourth Street West in the City of Calgary; thence southerly along the centre line of Fourth Street West to its intersection with the production easterly of the north boundary of Section 9, Township 23, Range 1, west of the 5th Meridian; thence westerly along the north boundary of the said Section 9 and along the north boundaries of Sections 8 and 7 in the said township and the production thereof westerly to the Meridian between Ranges 1 and 2, west of the 5th Meridian; thence northerly along the said meridian between ranges 1 and 2 to the north-east corner of section 36, township 23, range 2 west of the fifth meridian, to the centre line of Twenty-fourth Street South West to the centre line of Thirty-fourth Avenue South West in the said city; thence easterly along the said line of Thirty-fourth Avenue South West to the centre line of Fourteenth Street South West to the centre line of Seventeenth Avenue South West aforesaid; thence easterly along the centre line of Seventeenth Avenue South West to the point of commencement.
Note: Boundaries aligned with Calgary city limits expansion.

Calgary Glenmore 1961 boundaries
Bordering districts
| North | East | West | South |
|---|---|---|---|
| Calgary West | Calgary Centre, Calgary South | Banff-Cochrane | Banff-Cochrane |
| riding map goes here | | map in relation to other districts in Calgary goes here | |
Legal description from the Statutes of Alberta 1961, Legislative Assembly Act.
Electoral Division of Calgary Glenmore, the boundary whereof is as follows: Commencing at the intersection of the centre lines of 17th avenue south west and Centre Street; thence southerly along the centre line of Centre Street and along its southerly production to the right bank of the Elbow River; thence upstream along the said right bank to the centre line of Elbow Drive; thence in a general southerly direction along the said centre line to the centre line of 82nd avenue south west; thence westerly along the said centre line and along its westerly production to the south shore of the Glenmore Reservoir; thence in a general westerly direction along the said south shore to the east boundary of range 2, west of the 5th meridian; thence northerly along the said east boundary to the left bank of the Elbow River; thence upstream along the said left bank to its intersection with the north boundary of section 34, township 23, range 2, west of the 5th meridian; thence easterly along the said section; thence northerly along the east boundary of section 3, township 24, range 2, west of the 5th meridian to the centre line of Bragg Creek Road; thence in a general north-easterly direction along the said centre line to the centre line of Richmond Road; thence in a general north-easterly direction along the said centre line to the centre line of 24th street south west; thence southerly along the said centre line to the centre line of 34th avenue south west; thence easterly along the said centre line to the centre line of 14th street south west; thence northerly along the said centre line to the centre line of 14th street south west; thence northerly along the said centre line to the centre line of 17th avenue south west thence easterly along the said centre line to the point of commencement.
Note: Boundaries aligned with Calgary city limits expansion.

Calgary Glenmore 1962 boundaries
Bordering districts
| North | East | West | South |
|---|---|---|---|
| Calgary West | Calgary Centre, Calgary South | Banff-Cochrane | Banff-Cochrane |
| riding map goes here | | map in relation to other districts in Calgary goes here | |
Legal description from the Statutes of Alberta 1962, Legislative Assembly Act.
Electoral Division of Calgary Glenmore, the boundary whereof is as follows: Commencing at the intersection of the centre lines of 17th avenue and Centre Street; thence southerly along the centre line of Centre Street and along its southerly production to the right bank of the Elbow River; thence upstream along the said right bank to the centre line of Elbow Drive; thence in a general southerly direction along the said centre line of 114 avenue south-west; thence easterly along the said centre line to its intersection with the centre line of the Macleod Trail; thence in a general southerly direction along the said centre line to the left bank of Fish Creek; thence downstream along the said left bank to its intersection with the north boundary of section 25, township 22, range 1, west of the 5th meridian; thence northerly along the said east boundary to the left bank of the Elbow River; thence upstream along the said left bank to its intersection with the north boundary of section 34, township 23, range 2 west of the 5th meridian; thence easterly along the said north boundary to the north-east corner of the said section; thence northerly along the east boundary of section 3, township 24, range 2, west of the 5th meridian to the centre line of Bragg Creek Road; thence in a general north-easterly direction along the said centre line to the centre line of 32nd avenue south-west; thence in a general easterly direction along the said centre line to the centre line of 24th street south-west; thence southerly along the centre line to the centre line of 34th avenue south west; thence easterly along the said centre line to the centre line of 14th street south westl thence northerly along the said centre line to the centre line of 17th avenue south west; thence easterly along the said centre line to the point of commencement.
Note: Boundaries aligned with Calgary city limits expansion.

Calgary Glenmore 1966 boundaries
Bordering districts
| North | East | West | South |
|---|---|---|---|
| Calgary West, Calgary Victoria Park | Calgary South | Banff-Cochrane | Banff-Cochrane |
| riding map goes here | | map in relation to other districts in Calgary goes here | |
Legal description from the Statutes of Alberta 1966, Legislative Assembly Act.
Electoral Division of Calgary Glenmore, the boundary whereof is as follows: Commencing at the intersection of the centre line of Elbow Drive with the right bank of the Elbow River; thence in a general southerly direction along the centre line of Elbow Drive and its southerly production to its intersection with the centre line of 114th avenue south west; thence easterly along the said centre line to the centre line of Highway No. 2; thence in a general southerly direction along the said centre line to the left bank of Fish Creek; thence downstream along the said left bank to its intersection with the north boundary of section 25, township 22, range 1, west of the 5th meridian; thence westerly along the said north boundary and the north boundary of sections 26 to 30 in said township to the east boundary of range 2, west of the 5th meridian; thence northerly along the said east boundary to the left bank of the Elbow River; thence upstream along the said left bank to its intersection with the north boundary of section 34, township 23, range 2 west of the 5th meridian; thence easterly along the said section; thence northerly along the east boundary of section 3 township 24, range 2, west of the 5th meridian to the centre line of Bragg Creek Road; thence in a general north-easterly direction along the said centre line and the centre line of Richmond Road to the centre line of 32nd avenue south west; thence in a general easterly direction along the said centre line to the centre line of 24th street south west; thence southerly along the said centre line to the centre line of 34th avenue south west; thence easterly along the said centre line to the centre line of 14th street south west; thence southerly along the said centre line of 14th street south west and its southerly production to its intersection with the production of the centre line of 42nd avenue south west; thence easterly along the said production of the said centre line of 42nd avenue south west to its intersection with the right bank of the Elbow River; thence downstream along the said right bank to the point of commencement.
Note: Major boundary re-alignment

69. Calgary-Glenmore 1970 boundaries
Bordering districts
| North | East | West | South |
|---|---|---|---|
| Calgary Currie, Calgary Elbow | Calgary Egmont | Banff | Banff |
| riding map goes here | | map in relation to other districts in Calgary goes here | |
Legal description from the Statutes of Alberta 1970, Legislative Assembly Act.
The boundary whereof is as follows: Commencing at the intersection of the centre line of Elbow Drive with the centre line of the Glenmore Trail; thence southerly along the centre line of Elbow Drive to the centre line of Heritage Drive; thence easterly along the said centre line to the centre line of the Macleod Trail; thence in a general southerly direction along the said centre line to the north boundary of section 27 in township 22, range 1, west of the 5th meridian; thence westerly along the said north boundary and the north boundary of sections 28 to 30 in said township to the east boundary of range 2, west of the 5th meridian; thence northerly along the said east boundary to the centre line of 66th avenue south west; thence easterly along the said centre line to the centre line of 37th street south west; thence northerly along the said centre line to the centre line of the Glenmore Trail; thence in a general south-easterly direction along the said centre line to the point of commencement.
Note: First major redistribution

Calgary-Glenmore 1977 boundaries
Bordering districts
| North | East | West | South |
|---|---|---|---|
| Calgary Currie, Calgary Elbow | Calgary Egmont | Banff-Cochrane | Calgary Fish Creek |
| riding map goes here | | map in relation to other districts in Calgary goes here | |
Legal description from the Statutes of Alberta 1977, Legislative Assembly Statutes Amendment Act.
The boundary whereof is as follows: Commencing at the intersection of the north shore of the Glenmore Reservoir with the east boundary of range 2, west of the 5th meridian; thence in a general south-easterly and north-easterly direction along the north shore of the Glenmore Reservoir to the centre line of the Glenmore Reservoir Dam; thence south-easterly along the said centre line to the east shore of the Glenmore Reservoir; thence in a general southerly direction along the said east shore to the centre line of the Glenmore Trail; thence south-easterly and easterly along the said centre line to the centre line of Elbow Drive; thence southerly along the said centre line to the centre line of Heritage Drive; thence easterly along the said centre line to the centre line of the Macleod Trail; thence southerly along the said centre line to the centre line of Anderson Road; thence westerly along the said centre line and the centre line 114th avenue south west to the east boundary of range 2. west of the 5th meridian; thence northerly along the said east boundary to the point of commencement.
Note: Second major boundary redistribution.

14 Calgary-Glenmore 1983 boundaries
Bordering districts
| North | East | West | South |
|---|---|---|---|
| Calgary Currie, Calgary Elbow | Calgary Egmont | Banff-Cochrane | Calgary Fish Creek |
| riding map goes here | | map in relation to other districts in Calgary goes here | |
Legal description from the Statutes of Alberta 1983, Electoral Divisions Act.
Note: The Legislative Assembly moved boundaries from the Legislative Assembly Act to the Electoral Divisions Act and reassigned district numbers. The boundaries for 1983 are identical to 1977 boundaries.

14 Calgary-Glenmore 1985 boundaries
Bordering districts
| North | East | West | South |
|---|---|---|---|
| Calgary Currie, Calgary Elbow, Calgary West | Calgary Egmont, Calgary Fish Creek | Banff-Cochrane | Calgary Shaw |
| riding map goes here | | map in relation to other districts in Calgary goes here | |
Legal description from the Statutes of Alberta 1985, Electoral Divisions Amendment Act.
The boundary whereof is as follows: Commencing at the intersection of the north-westerly production of the centre line of Southland Drive south-west and the Calgary City boundary as of May 1984; thence northerly along the said boundary to the north shore of the Glenmore Reservoir; thence in a general north-easterly direction along the said north shore to the centre line of the Glenmore Reservoir Dam; thence south-easterly along the said centre line to the east shore of Glenmore Rservoir; thence in a general south-easterly direction along the said centre line to the centre line of Glenmore Trail; thence in a general easterly direction along the said centre line to the centre line of Elbow Drive; thence southerly along the centre line of Elbow Drive to the centre line of Heritage Drive; thence easterly along the said centre line to the centre line of the Macleod Trail; thence southerly along the said centre line to the centre line of Anderson Road; thence westerly along the said centre line to the centre line of 14th street south-west; thence northerly along the said centre line to the centre line of Southland Drive south-west; thence in a general westerly direction along the said centre line and its westerly production to the point of commencement.
Note: Minor boundary realignment

13 Calgary-Glenmore 1996 boundaries
Bordering districts
| North | East | West | South |
|---|---|---|---|
| Calgary Elbow | Calgary Egmont | Banff-Cochrane | Calgary Lougheed, Calgary Fish Creek |
| riding map goes here | | map in relation to other districts in Calgary goes here | |
Legal description from the Statutes of Alberta 2000, Electoral Divisions Act.
Starting at the intersection of the west Calgary city boundary with the west boundary of section 30, township 23, range 1, west of the 5th meridian; then south along the section boundary to the north shore of the Glenmore Reservoir; then generally southeast and northeast along the north shore of the Glenmore Reservoir to Glenmore Trail SW; then southeast along Glenmore Trail SW to 14 Street SW; then south along 14 Street SW to the westerly extension of 75 Avenue SW; then east along the extension and 75 Avenue SW to Elbow Drive SW; then south along Elbow Drive SW to Heritage Drive SW; then east along Heritage Drive SW to Macleod Trail S; then south along Macleod Trail S to Anderson Road SW; then west along Anderson Road SW to 24 Street SW; then north along 24 Street SW to Southland Drive SW; then west along Southland Drive SW to Oakfield Drive SW; then generally northwest along the proposed Southland Drive SW to the west Calgary city boundary; then generally north, west, north and east along the city boundary to the starting point.
Note:

12 Calgary-Glenmore 2003 boundaries
Bordering districts
| North | East | West | South |
|---|---|---|---|
| Calgary Elbow | Calgary Egmont | Foothills-Rocky View | Calgary Lougheed, Calgary Fish Creek |
| riding map goes here | | | |
Legal description from the Statutes of Alberta 2003, Electoral Divisions Act.
Starting at the intersection of the west Calgary city boundary with the west boundary of Sec. 30 Twp. 23 Rge. 1 W5 (near 66 Avenue SW); then 1. south along the west boundary of Sec. 30 to the north shore of the Glenmore Reservoir; 2. generally southeast and northeast along the north shore of the Glenmore Reservoir to Glenmore Trail SW; 3. southeast along Glenmore Trail SW to the east shore of Glenmore Reservoir; 4. generally south, southwest and southeast along the east shore of Glenmore Reservoir to the westerly extension of Heritage Drive SW; 5. east along the extension and Heritage Drive SW to the Light Rail Transit (LRT) Line; 6. in a generally southerly direction along the LRT Line to Anderson Road SW; 7. west along Anderson Road SW to the west Calgary city boundary; 8. generally north, west, north and east along the west Calgary city boundary to the starting point.
Note:

13 Calgary-Glenmore 2010 boundaries
Bordering districts
| North | East | West | South |
|---|---|---|---|
| Calgary-Elbow | Calgary-Acadia | Chestermere-Rocky View | Calgary-Fish Creek and Calgary-Lougheed |
Legal description from the Statutes of Alberta 2010, Electoral Divisions Act.
Note: Lost part of Southwood, gained neighborhoods from Heritage Drive to Glenmore Trail

=== Electoral history ===
Calgary-Glenmore
| Assembly | Years | Member | Party |
|---|---|---|---|
Riding created from Calgary
| 14th | 1959–1963 | Ernest Watkins | Progressive Conservative |
| 15th | 1963–1967 | Bill Dickie | Liberal |
| 16th | 1967–1969 | Bill Dickie | Liberal |
| 16th | 1969–1971 | Bill Dickie | Progressive Conservative |
| 17th | 1971–1975 | Bill Dickie | Progressive Conservative |
| 18th | 1975–1979 | Hugh Planche | Progressive Conservative |
| 19th | 1979–1982 | Hugh Planche | Progressive Conservative |
| 20th | 1982–1986 | Hugh Planche | Progressive Conservative |
| 21st | 1986–1989 | Dianne Mirosh | Progressive Conservative |
| 22nd | 1989–1993 | Dianne Mirosh | Progressive Conservative |
| 23rd | 1993–1997 | Dianne Mirosh | Progressive Conservative |
| 24th | 1997–2001 | Ron Stevens | Progressive Conservative |
| 25th | 2001–2004 | Ron Stevens | Progressive Conservative |
| 26th | 2004–2008 | Ron Stevens | Progressive Conservative |
| 27th | 2008–2009 | Ron Stevens | Progressive Conservative |
| 27th | 2009–2012 | Paul Hinman | Wildrose |
| 28th | 2012–2015 | Linda Johnson | Progressive Conservative |
| 29th | 2015–2019 | Anam Kazim | New Democratic |
| 30th | 2019–2023 | Whitney Issik | United Conservative |
| 31st | 2023–Present | Nagwan Al-Guneid | New Democratic |

When Calgary-Glenmore was created in 1959, it covered most of Southwest Calgary that existed at the time. Voters of the district returned Progressive Conservative candidate Ernest Watkins, who was the last representative elected in the old Calgary electoral district in a 1957 by-election. He became the only candidate from his party who returned to the Legislature that year and one of four opposition candidates elected as most of the province had chosen Social Credit candidates that year.

Watkins became leader of the Progressive Conservatives shortly after his election. He held the leadership until 1962 when he stepped down. He decided not to run for re-election and retired from the Legislature.

The riding continued its trend of electing opposition candidates by returning Liberal candidate Bill Dickie. Dickie who had served as a Calgary Alderman was just one of two Liberals elected in the 1963 general election. He was re-elected in 1967 and crossed the floor to the Progressive Conservatives on November 23, 1969. He would be the last serving member under the Liberal banner until 1986.

The voters of Glenmore re-elected Dickie as a Progressive Conservative in the 1971 election as that party won its first term in Government under Peter Lougheed. Dickie served as the first member of cabinet for the district with the portfolio of Minister of Mines and Minerals. He retired in 1975 and was replaced by Hugh Planche who won some of the biggest majorities in his three terms representing Calgary-Glenmore. Planche served in cabinet as Minister of Economic Development from 1979 until his retirement in 1986.

The fourth member of the district Dianne Mirosh served in cabinet as Minister of Innovation and Science and later as Minister of Transportation during her time in office from 1986 to 1997. She had some tough electoral battles with Liberal candidate Brendan Dunphy as he almost managed to defeat Mirosh twice.

Ron Stevens became the districts MLA in 1997 serving until 2009. He served a number of cabinet portfolios. His first portfolio was Minister of Gaming starting in 2001. He then moved on to be the Minister of International and Intergovernmental Relations, then Attorney General and finally Deputy Premier. Stevens vacated his seat on May 15, 2009.

On September 14, 2009, the district would provide its first surprise result since the 1960s by electing Wildrose Alliance candidate Paul Hinman in a hotly contested race. Hinman was leader of his party at the time and previously served as the representative for Cardston-Taber-Warner before being defeated in 2008.

In the 2012 Alberta general election Hinman lost his seat to Progressive Conservative Linda Johnson, despite Wildrose making gains elsewhere in the province.

In 2015, Johnson and NDP candidate Anam Kazim won exactly the same number of votes in the initial count. Elections Alberta confirmed in a recount that Kazim defeated Johnson by a razor-thin margin, taking Calgary-Glenmore for the NDP.

Kazim lost the NDP nomination ahead of the 2019 election. The new nominee was defeated by the United Conservative Party candidate, Whitney Issik. From 2022, Issik would go on to be minister of Environment and Parks.

In 2023, for the first time since 1982, the Liberals did not field a candidate for the district. This contributed to narrowing the number of candidates, down to three, the lowest number since the 1971 election. For the fifth time in a row, the incumbent party was defeated. Like in 2015, the NDP prevailed on a close margin, 42 votes. The incumbent Whitney Issik was thus defeated by Nagwan Al-Guneid. She has been named the Official Opposition critic for Energy and Minerals.

== Legislative election results ==
=== 1959 ===
1959 Alberta general election
| Party | Candidate | Votes | % | ±% |
|---|---|---|---|---|
| Progressive Conservative | Ernest S. Watkins | 4,893 | 42.58% | – |
| Social Credit | A. Ross Lawson | 4,681 | 40.74% | – |
| Liberal | Reg. Clarkson | 1,916 | 16.68% | – |
| Total | | 11,490 | – | – |
| Rejected, spoiled and declined | | 46 | – | – |
| Eligible electors / Turnout | | 21,113 | 54.64% | – |
| Progressive Conservative pickup new district. | | | | |
Source(s) Source: "Calgary-Glenmore Official Results 1959 Alberta general election". Alberta Heritage Community Foundation.

=== 1963 ===
1963 Alberta general election
| Party | Candidate | Votes | % | ±% |
|---|---|---|---|---|
| Liberal | William Daniel Dickie | 6,037 | 44.49% | 27.81% |
| Social Credit | A. Ross Lawson | 4,268 | 31.45% | -9.29% |
| Progressive Conservative | Ned Corrigal | 2,891 | 21.30% | -21.28% |
| New Democratic | G.A.J. Otjes | 374 | 2.76% | – |
| Total | | 13,570 | – | – |
| Rejected, spoiled and declined | | 22 | – | – |
| Eligible electors / Turnout | | 25,327 | 53.67% | -0.97% |
| Liberal gain from Progressive Conservative | | Swing | | 5.60% |
Source(s) Source: "Calgary-Glenmore Official Results 1963 Alberta general election". Alberta Heritage Community Foundation.

=== 1967 ===
1967 Alberta general election
| Party | Candidate | Votes | % | ±% |
|---|---|---|---|---|
| Liberal | William Daniel Dickie | 5,743 | 41.20% | -3.29% |
| Social Credit | Len Pearson | 3,840 | 27.55% | -3.90% |
| Progressive Conservative | Ronald M. Helmer | 3,406 | 24.44% | 3.13% |
| New Democratic | Max Wolfe | 950 | 6.82% | 4.06% |
| Total | | 13,939 | – | – |
| Rejected, spoiled and declined | | 60 | – | – |
| Eligible electors / Turnout | | 20,234 | 69.19% | 15.52% |
| Liberal hold | | Swing | | 0.31% |
Source(s) Source: "Calgary-Glenmore Official Results 1967 Alberta general election". Alberta Heritage Community Foundation.

=== 1971 ===
1971 Alberta general election
| Party | Candidate | Votes | % | ±% |
|---|---|---|---|---|
| Progressive Conservative | William Daniel Dickie | 7,658 | 56.37% | 31.93% |
| Social Credit | Raymond A. Kingsmith | 5,122 | 37.70% | 10.15% |
| New Democratic | George C. McGuire | 806 | 5.93% | -0.88% |
| Total | | 13,586 | – | – |
| Rejected, spoiled and declined | | 178 | – | – |
| Eligible electors / Turnout | | 17,873 | 77.01% | 7.82% |
| Progressive Conservative gain from Liberal | | Swing | | 2.51% |
Source(s) Source: "Calgary-Glenmore Official Results 1971 Alberta general election". Alberta Heritage Community Foundation.

=== 1975 ===
1975 Alberta general election
| Party | Candidate | Votes | % | ±% |
|---|---|---|---|---|
| Progressive Conservative | Hugh L. Planche | 10,641 | 65.92% | 9.55% |
| Liberal | Nicholas Taylor | 4,166 | 25.81% | – |
| Social Credit | Ralph Cameron | 838 | 5.19% | -32.51% |
| New Democratic | Bill Peterson | 498 | 3.08% | -2.85% |
| Total | | 16,143 | – | – |
| Rejected, spoiled and declined | | 16 | – | – |
| Eligible electors / turnout | | 25,133 | 64.29% | -12.72% |
| Progressive Conservative hold | | Swing | | 10.72% |
Source(s) Source: "Calgary-Glenmore Official Results 1975 Alberta general election". Alberta Heritage Community Foundation.

=== 1979 ===
1979 Alberta general election
| Party | Candidate | Votes | % | ±% |
|---|---|---|---|---|
| Progressive Conservative | Hugh L. Planche | 8,212 | 55.83% | -10.08% |
| Liberal | Nicholas Taylor | 4,774 | 32.46% | 6.65% |
| Social Credit | Ernie Kaszas | 1,280 | 8.70% | 3.51% |
| New Democratic | Neil Ellison | 442 | 3.01% | -0.08% |
| Total | | 14,708 | – | – |
| Rejected, spoiled and declined | | 25 | – | – |
| Eligible electors / turnout | | 25,017 | 58.89% | -5.40% |
| Progressive Conservative hold | | Swing | | -8.37% |
Source(s) Source: "Calgary-Glenmore Official Results 1979 Alberta general election". Alberta Heritage Community Foundation.

=== 1982 ===
1982 Alberta general election
| Party | Candidate | Votes | % | ±% |
|---|---|---|---|---|
| Progressive Conservative | Hugh L. Planche | 13,835 | 77.91% | 22.08% |
| Western Canada Concept | Brian McClung | 1,864 | 10.50% | – |
| New Democratic | George Yanchula | 1,532 | 8.63% | 5.62% |
| Alberta Reform Movement | Barry J. Rust | 526 | 2.96% | – |
| Total | | 17,757 | – | – |
| Rejected, spoiled and declined | | 64 | – | – |
| Eligible electors / turnout | | 26,773 | 66.56% | 7.67% |
| Progressive Conservative hold | | Swing | | 22.02% |
Source(s) Source: "Calgary-Glenmore Official Results 1982 Alberta general election". Alberta Heritage Community Foundation.

=== 1986 ===
1986 Alberta general election
| Party | Candidate | Votes | % | ±% |
|---|---|---|---|---|
| Progressive Conservative | Dianne Mirosh | 5,718 | 60.37% | -17.55% |
| Liberal | Lois Cummings | 2,033 | 21.46% | – |
| New Democratic | Kelly Hegg | 1,337 | 14.12% | 5.49% |
| Independent | Larry R Heather | 384 | 4.05% | – |
| Total | | 9,472 | – | – |
| Rejected, spoiled and declined | | 30 | – | – |
| Eligible electors / turnout | | 20,333 | 46.73% | -19.83% |
| Progressive Conservative hold | | Swing | | -14.26% |
Source(s) Source: "Calgary-Glenmore Official Results 1986 Alberta general election". Alberta Heritage Community Foundation.

=== 1989 ===
1989 Alberta general election
| Party | Candidate | Votes | % | ±% |
|---|---|---|---|---|
| Progressive Conservative | Dianne Mirosh | 5,189 | 45.48% | -14.89% |
| Liberal | Brendan Dunphy | 4,587 | 40.20% | 18.74% |
| New Democratic | Barry Bristman | 1,197 | 10.49% | -3.62% |
| Independent | Greg Pearson | 437 | 3.83% | – |
| Total | | 11,410 | – | – |
| Rejected, spoiled and declined | | 23 | – | – |
| Eligible electors / turnout | | 20,902 | 54.70% | 7.97% |
| Progressive Conservative hold | | Swing | | -16.81% |
Source(s) Source: "Calgary-Glenmore Official Results 1989 Alberta general election". Alberta Heritage Community Foundation.

=== 1993 ===
1993 Alberta general election
| Party | Candidate | Votes | % | ±% |
|---|---|---|---|---|
| Progressive Conservative | Dianne Mirosh | 7,972 | 48.63% | 3.16% |
| Liberal | Brendan Dunphy | 7,064 | 43.09% | 2.89% |
| New Democratic | Noreen Murphy | 603 | 3.68% | -6.81% |
| Social Credit | Stuart van der Lee | 545 | 3.32% | – |
| Greens | Sol Candel | 147 | 0.90% | – |
| Natural Law | John Vrskovy | 61 | 0.37% | – |
| Total | | 16,392 | – | – |
| Rejected, spoiled and declined | | 33 | – | – |
| Eligible electors / turnout | | 23,806 | 69.00% | 14.30% |
| Progressive Conservative hold | | Swing | | 0.13% |
Source(s) Source: "Calgary-Glenmore Official Results 1993 Alberta general election". Alberta Heritage Community Foundation.

=== 1997 ===
1997 Alberta general election
| Party | Candidate | Votes | % | ±% |
|---|---|---|---|---|
| Progressive Conservative | Ron Stevens | 8,247 | 58.14% | 9.51% |
| Liberal | Wayne Stewart | 4,919 | 34.68% | -8.41% |
| Social Credit | Vernon Cook | 583 | 4.11% | 0.79% |
| New Democratic | Grace Johner | 435 | 3.07% | -0.61% |
| Total | | 14,184 | – | – |
| Rejected, spoiled and declined | | 25 | 25 | 5 |
| Eligible electors / turnout | | 23,818 | 59.67% | -9.32% |
| Progressive Conservative hold | | Swing | | 8.96% |
Source(s) Source: "Calgary-Glenmore Official Results 1997 Alberta general election". Alberta Heritage Community Foundation.

=== 2001 ===
2001 Alberta general election
| Party | Candidate | Votes | % | ±% |
|---|---|---|---|---|
| Progressive Conservative | Ron Stevens | 9,678 | 67.71% | 9.56% |
| Liberal | Michael Broadhurst | 3,708 | 25.94% | -8.74% |
| Greens | James S. Kohut | 467 | 3.27% | – |
| New Democratic | Jennifer Stewart | 441 | 3.09% | 0.02% |
| Total | | 14,294 | – | – |
| Rejected, spoiled and declined | | 37 | 13 | 5 |
| Eligible electors / turnout | | 23,644 | 60.63% | 0.96% |
| Progressive Conservative hold | | Swing | | 9.15% |
Source(s) Source: "Calgary-Glenmore statement of official results 2001 Alberta general election" (PDF). Elections Alberta.

=== 2004 ===
2004 Alberta general election
| Party | Candidate | Votes | % | ±% |
|---|---|---|---|---|
| Progressive Conservative | Ron Stevens | 6,263 | 50.47% | -17.24% |
| Liberal | Avalon Roberts | 4,364 | 35.17% | 9.22% |
| Alberta Alliance | Ernest McCutcheon | 571 | 4.60% | – |
| New Democratic | Holly Heffernan | 553 | 4.46% | 1.37% |
| Green | Evan Sklarski | 532 | 4.29% | 1.02% |
| Social Credit | Larry R. Heather | 127 | 1.02% | – |
| Total | | 12,410 | – | – |
| Rejected, spoiled and declined | | 50 | 8 | 9 |
| Eligible electors / turnout | | 25,788 | 48.35% | -12.28% |
| Progressive Conservative hold | | Swing | | -13.23% |
Source(s) Source: "Calgary-Glenmore Statement of Official Results 2004 Alberta general election" (PDF). Elections Alberta.

=== 2008 ===
2008 Alberta general election
| Party | Candidate | Votes | % | ±% |
|---|---|---|---|---|
| Progressive Conservative | Ron Stevens | 6,436 | 50.67% | 0.21% |
| Liberal | Avalon Roberts | 4,213 | 33.17% | -1.99% |
| Wildrose Alliance | Ryan Sadler | 1,025 | 8.07% | 2.47% |
| Green | Arden Duncan Bonokoski | 550 | 4.33% | 0.04% |
| New Democratic | Holly Heffernan | 477 | 3.76% | -0.70% |
| Total | | 12,701 | – | – |
| Rejected, spoiled and declined | | 36 | 20 | 1 |
| Eligible electors / turnout | | 27,997 | 45.50% | -2.85% |
| Progressive Conservative hold | | Swing | | 1.10% |
Source(s) Source: "12 - Calgary-Glenmore, 2008 Alberta general election". officialresults.elections.ab.ca. Elections Alberta.

=== 2009 by-election ===
The 2009 by-election was initiated by the resignation of incumbent Ron Stevens on May 15, 2009. Stevens left office to accept a judicial post five days later on May 20, 2009. Premier Stelmach had six months to call the election, but he didn't wait the full-time period instead calling it for September 14, 2009.

The by-election attracted a few high-profile candidates. The only person to run for the Progressive Conservative nomination was Calgary Ward 13 Alderman Diane Colley-Urquhart. She was acclaimed as the candidate by the Progressive Conservative party on June 4, 2009.

The nomination for the provincial Liberal party which had previously held the riding and had finished second in every year since 1982 was hotly contested. The first candidate to announce his intention to run for the Alberta Liberal Party nomination was former Ontario NDP MPP George Dadamo. He served in the Bob Rae government from 1990 to 1995. A second candidate for the Liberal party announced on 1 June 2009, Corey Hogan a Liberal party insider. The result of Hogan running caused Dadamo to withdraw. The Liberal nominating convention took place on June 22, 2009, and resulted with 2004 and 2008 Liberal candidate Avalon Roberts winning.

The nominee for the Wildrose Alliance was former Cardston-Taber-Warner MLA and Leader of the party Paul Hinman. Hinman grew up in the community of Haysboro located in the constituency. The Wildrose Alliance nomination convention was held on June 23, 2009, with Hinman receiving the nomination by acclamation.

Candidates rounding out the field were Social Credit leader Len Skowronski who was the first candidate to be nominated and the New Democrats nominated Eric Carpendale. An Independent candidate Antoni Grochowski also filed nomination papers. He had previously run as a Social Credit candidate in Calgary-Buffalo in 2008

The election was a major test for all the political parties. The Liberals under new leader David Swann having taken the reins of the leadership in 2008 were facing their first electoral test. The Progressive Conservatives popularity was tested for the first time after winning their massive majority under Premier Ed Stelmach in the 2008 general election. The Wildrose Alliance would test their viability as a party in being able to attract enough votes in an urban riding to elect a candidate.

On election night the results showed a hotly contested race between Hinman and Roberts with Hinman coming out on top by a margin of nearly 300 votes. The result was a bitter disappointment for David Swann and the Liberals and would eventually lead him to resign as leader of the Liberal party. The Progressive Conservatives finished a distant third for the first time in the riding since 1967 and lost control of the seat they had held since 1969. The bottom three candidates barely registered with voters. The NDP result was the worst ever result in a Calgary riding since the party was formed and the Social Credit vote continued to decline falling below a percent.

Alberta provincial by-election, September 14, 2009
| Party | Candidate | Votes | % | ±% |
|---|---|---|---|---|
| Wildrose Alliance | Paul Hinman | 4,052 | 36.87% | 28.80% |
| Liberal | Avalon Roberts | 3,774 | 34.34% | 1.17% |
| Progressive Conservative | Diane Colley-Urquhart | 2,847 | 25.90% | −24.77% |
| New Democratic | Eric Carpendale | 148 | 1.34% | −2.42% |
| Social Credit | Len Skowronski | 99 | 0.90% | – |
| Independent | Antoni Grochowski | 71 | 0.65% | – |
| Total | | 10,991 | – | – |
| Rejected, spoiled and declined | | 29 | 5 | 1 |
| Eligible electors / turnout | | 28,164 | 39.15% | -6.35% |
| Wildrose Alliance gain from Progressive Conservative | | Swing | | 14.99 |
Source(s) Source: Chief Electoral Officer (November 20, 2009). Report on the September 14, 2009 Calgary-Glenmore By-Election. Edmonton: Elections Alberta. ISBN 0981120172.

=== 2012 ===
2012 Alberta general election
| Party | Candidate | Votes | % | ±% |
|---|---|---|---|---|
| Progressive Conservative | Linda Johnson | 9,710 | 47.93% | 22.03% |
| Wildrose | Paul Hinman | 7,902 | 39.01% | 2.14% |
| Liberal | Dan MacAuley | 1,437 | 7.09% | -27.15% |
| New Democratic | Rick Collier | 1,208 | 5.96% | 4.62% |
| Total | | 20,257 | – | – |
| Rejected, spoiled and declined | | 144 | 32 | 11 |
| Eligible electors / turnout | | 34,592 | 59.01% | 19.86% |
| Progressive Conservative gain from Wildrose | | Swing | | -4.29% |
Source(s) Source: "13 - Calgary-Glenmore, 2012 Alberta general election". officialresults.elections.ab.ca. Elections Alberta.

=== 2015 ===
The initial result of the 2015 general election was a tie between PC candidate Linda Johnson and NDP candidate Anam Kazim, each with exactly 7,015 votes. On May 15, Anam Kazim was declared the winner after a recount. On May 22, Johnson requested a judicial recount of the results. On June 3, Johnson decided she would not appeal the judicial recount, therefore she conceded and Anam Kazim was announced the winner as the judicial recount found she did indeed win with a razor thin 6 vote margin. With the judge's ruling, 3 additional votes were added each to Johnson and Kazim's vote total, however this did not change the outcome of the race.

2015 Alberta general election
| Party | Candidate | Votes | % | ±% |
|---|---|---|---|---|
| New Democratic | Anam Kazim | 7,021 | 33.18% | 27.22% |
| Progressive Conservative | Linda Johnson | 7,015 | 33.16% | -14.78% |
| Wildrose | Chris Kemp-Jackson | 5,058 | 23.91% | -15.10% |
| Liberal | Dave Waddington | 1,345 | 6.36% | -0.74% |
| Alberta Party | Terry Lo | 719 | 3.40% | – |
| Total | | 21,158 | – | – |
| Rejected, spoiled and declined | | 93 | 32 | 9 |
| Eligible electors / turnout | | 37,109 | 57.29% | -1.72% |
| New Democratic gain from Progressive Conservative | | Swing | | -4.45% |
Source(s) Source: "13 - Calgary-Glenmore, 2015 Alberta general election". officialresults.elections.ab.ca. Elections Alberta. Results shown following Judicial Recount.

=== 2019 ===
2019 Alberta general election
| Party | Candidate | Votes | % | ±% | Expenditures |
|---|---|---|---|---|---|
| United Conservative | Whitney Issik | 14,565 | 55.64% | -1.42% | $62,782 |
| New Democratic | Jordan Stein | 8,379 | 32.01% | -1.18% | $15,470 |
| Alberta Party | Scott Appleby | 2,217 | 8.47% | 5.07% | $10,305 |
| Liberal | Shirley Ksienski | 424 | 1.62% | -4.74% | $3,129 |
| Green | Allie Tulick | 311 | 1.19% | – | $3,709 |
| Freedom Conservative | Dejan Ristic | 159 | 0.61% | – | $500 |
| Alberta Independence | Rafael Krukowski | 123 | 0.47% | – | $739 |
| Total | | 26,178 | – | – | |
| Rejected, spoiled and declined | | 86 | 57 | 7 | |
| Eligible electors / turnout | | 36,691 | 71.60% | 14.31% | |
| United Conservative gain from New Democratic | | Swing | | 11.80% | |
Source(s) Source: Elections Alberta Note: Expenses is the sum of "Election Expenses", "Other Expenses" and "Transfers Issued". The Elections Act limits "Election Expenses" to $50,000.

=== 2023 ===
2023 Alberta general election
| Party | Candidate | Votes | % | ±% |
|---|---|---|---|---|
| New Democratic | Nagwan Al-Guneid | 12,681 | 49.26 | +17.25 |
| United Conservative | Whitney Issik | 12,639 | 49.10 | -6.54 |
| Green | Steven Maffioli | 423 | 1.64 | +0.46 |
| Total | | 25,743 | 99.00 | – |
| Rejected and declined | | 260 | 1.00 | |
| Turnout | | 26,003 | 70.17 | |
| Eligible electors | | 37,058 | | |
| New Democratic gain from United Conservative | | Swing | | +11.90 |
Source(s) Source: Elections Alberta

== Senate nominee election results ==
=== 2004 ===
| 2004 Senate nominee election results: Calgary-Glenmore | | | | Turnout 48.38% | |
| Affiliation | Candidate | Votes | % votes | % ballots | Rank |
| Progressive Conservative | Bert Brown | 5,092 | 18.04% | 52.78% | 1 |
| Progressive Conservative | Jim Silye | 4,371 | 15.48% | 45.31% | 5 |
| Progressive Conservative | Betty Unger | 3,906 | 13.84% | 40.49% | 2 |
| Independent | Link Byfield | 2,807 | 9.94% | 29.09% | 4 |
| Progressive Conservative | David Usherwood | 2,783 | 9.86% | 28.85% | 6 |
| Progressive Conservative | Cliff Breitkreuz | 2,384 | 8.45% | 24.71% | 3 |
| Independent | Tom Sindlinger | 2,031 | 7.20% | 21.05% | 9 |
| Alberta Alliance | Vance Gough | 1,711 | 6.06% | 17.73% | 8 |
| Alberta Alliance | Michael Roth | 1,643 | 5.82% | 17.03% | 7 |
| Alberta Alliance | Gary Horan | 1,502 | 5.31% | 15.57% | 10 |
| Total votes | | 28,230 | 100% | | |
| Total ballots | | 9,648 | 2.93 votes per ballot | | |
| Rejected, spoiled and declined | | 2,829 | | | |
25,788 eligible electors

Voters had the option of selecting four candidates on the ballot

== Student vote results ==
=== 2004 ===
Participating schools
Bishop Grandin High School
Harold Panabaker Jr. High School
Henry Wise Wood Senior High School
John Ware Junior High

On November 19, 2004, a student vote was conducted at participating Alberta schools to parallel the 2004 Alberta general election results. The vote was designed to educate students and simulate the electoral process for persons who have not yet reached the legal majority. The vote was conducted in 80 of the 83 provincial electoral districts with students voting for actual election candidates. Schools with a large student body that reside in another electoral district had the option to vote for candidates outside of the electoral district then where they were physically located.

2004 Alberta student vote results
| Affiliation | Candidate | Votes | % |
| Progressive Conservative | Ron Stevens | 306 | 31.55% |
| Liberal | Avalon Roberts | 240 | 24.74% |
| Green | Evan Sklarski | 178 | 18.35% |
| New Democratic | Holly Heffernan | 174 | 17.94% |
| Alberta Alliance | Ernest McCutcheon | 46 | 4.74% |
| Social Credit | Larry Heather | 26 | 2.68% |
| Total | | 970 | 100% |
| Rejected, spoiled and declined | | 17 | |

== See also ==
- List of Alberta provincial electoral districts
- Canadian provincial electoral districts
