= Anam Kazim =

Canadian politician

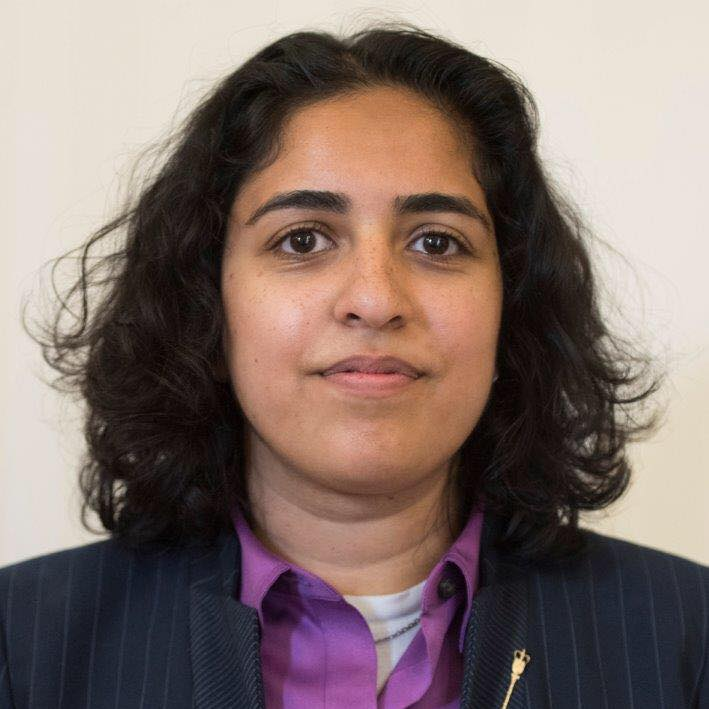

Member of the Legislative Assembly of Alberta for Calgary-Glenmore
- In office May 15, 2015 – April 16, 2019
- Preceded by: Linda Johnson
- Succeeded by: Whitney Issik

Personal details
- Born: 1986 or 1987 (age 38–39) Pakistan
- Party: Alberta New Democratic Party
- Occupation: Applications Engineer

Anam Kazim (born 1986) is a Canadian politician who was elected in the 2015 Alberta general election to the Legislative Assembly of Alberta representing the electoral district of Calgary-Glenmore.

On election night, the count of ballots left Kazim and incumbent MLA Linda Johnson in an exact tie of 7,015 votes each. Kazim was officially declared elected on May 15 after a recount.

Prior to serving with the Legislative Assembly, she spent two years as an applications engineer for an industrial pump manufacturer. Before that, she worked for two years as the director of training programs for an education and training centre that specialized in project management. She also spent close to five years working with Western University, where she obtained her postsecondary education, first as a teaching assistant and later as a research assistant.

Kazim holds a master's degree in biochemical/environmental engineering, a bachelor's degree in chemical engineering and is certified in conflict resolution.

Kazim lost the NDP nomination for Calgary-Glenmore to Jordan Stein in February 2019, and did not run in the 2019 Alberta general election.

== Electoral history ==
=== 2015 general election ===
2015 Alberta general election: Calgary-Glenmore
Party	Candidate	Votes	%	±%
New Democratic	Anam Kazim	7,021	33.18%	27.22%
Progressive Conservative	Linda Johnson	7,015	33.16%	-14.78%
Wildrose	Chris Kemp-Jackson	5,058	23.91%	-15.10%
Liberal	Dave Waddington	1,345	6.36%	-0.74%
Alberta Party	Terry Lo	719	3.40%	–
Total		21,158	–	–
Rejected, spoiled and declined		93	32	9
Eligible electors / turnout		37,109	57.29%	-1.72%
New Democratic gain from Progressive Conservative		Swing		-4.45%
Source(s) Source: "13 - Calgary-Glenmore, 2015 Alberta general election". officialresults.elections.ab.ca. Elections Alberta. Results shown following Judicial Recount.
