= Richard Gotfried =

Canadian politician

Member of the Legislative Assembly of Alberta for Calgary-Fish Creek
- In office May 5, 2015 – May 29, 2023
- Preceded by: Heather Forsyth
- Succeeded by: Myles McDougall

Personal details
- Born: September 18, 1958 (age 67) Calgary, Alberta
- Party: United Conservative
- Occupation: Business Executive - Aviation/Construction

Richard Stanley Gotfried (born September 18, 1958) is a Canadian politician who was elected in the 2019 Alberta General Election to the 30th Alberta Legislature, representing the electoral district of Calgary-Fish Creek for the United Conservative Party. He was re-elected to the riding with a voting plurality of 8,499, and has served the Fish Creek constituency as a Member of the Legislative Assembly (MLA) since the 2015 Alberta General Election. Prior to 2015, his seat was held by Heather Forsyth, who had served as the Leader of the Opposition before retiring from politics after the 2015 election was called.

He retired at the 2023 Alberta general election.

Gotfried currently serves as the Chair of Alberta's Strategic Aviation Advisory Council. Previously, he served as the President of the Pacific Northwest Economic Region, and as a vice president at Calgary Economic Development.

== Electoral history ==
=== 2019 General Election ===
2019 Alberta general election: Calgary-Fish Creek
| Party | Candidate | Votes | % | ±% | Expenditures |
|---|---|---|---|---|---|
| United Conservative | Richard Gotfried | 15,975 | 61.52 | -1.64 | $64,738 |
| New Democratic | Rebecca Bounsall | 7,476 | 28.79 | -1.85 | $46,721 |
| Alberta Party | Robert Tremblay | 1,699 | 6.54 | +2.16 | $1,077 |
| Liberal | John Roggeveen | 359 | 1.38 | +0.11 | $500 |
| Green | Taylor Stasila | 231 | 0.89 | – | $500 |
| Alberta Independence | Tomas Manasek | 226 | 0.87 | – | $937 |
| Total | | 25,966 | 99.58 | – | |
| Rejected, spoiled and declined | | 109 | 0.42 | | |
| Turnout | | 26,075 | 72.11 | | |
| Eligible voters | | 36,158 | | | |
| United Conservative notional hold | | Swing | | +0.11 | |
Source(s) Source: Elections Alberta Note: Expenses is the sum of "Election Expenses", "Other Expenses" and "Transfers Issued". The Elections Act limits "Election Expenses" to $50,000.

=== 2015 General Election ===
2015 Alberta general election: Calgary-Fish Creek
| Party | Candidate | Votes | % | ±% |
|---|---|---|---|---|
| Progressive Conservative | Richard Gotfried | 6,198 | 32.91% | -10.81% |
| New Democratic | Jill Moreton | 6,069 | 32.23% | 27.11% |
| Wildrose | Blaine Maller | 5,568 | 29.57% | -14.57% |
| Alberta Party | Allison Wemyss | 850 | 4.51% | – |
| Social Credit | Martin Owen | 148 | 0.79% | – |
| Total | | 18,833 | – | – |
| Rejected, spoiled and declined | | 36 | 27 | 6 |
| Eligible electors / turnout | | 30,931 | 61.02% | -0.05% |
| Progressive Conservative gain from Wildrose Alliance | | Swing | | 0.23% |
Source(s) Source: "10 - Calgary-Fish Creek, 2015 Alberta general election". officialresults.elections.ab.ca. Elections Alberta. Chief Electoral Officer (2016). 2015 General Election. A Report of the Chief Electoral Officer (PDF) (Report). Edmonton, Alta.: Elections Alberta.
