= Calgary-Fish Creek =

Provincial electoral district in Alberta, Canada

Coordinates: 50.93°N 114.04°W

Alberta electoral district
- Calgary-Fish Creek within the City of Calgary, 2017 boundaries

Provincial electoral district
- Legislature: Legislative Assembly of Alberta
MLA
Myles McDougall
United Conservative
- District created: 1979
- First contested: 1979
- Last contested: 2023

Calgary-Fish Creek is a provincial electoral district in Alberta, Canada. The district is one of 87 mandated to return a single member to the Legislative Assembly of Alberta using the first past the post method of voting.

The district is largely urban located in the south portion of the city of Calgary. It was named after Fish Creek Provincial Park and was created in the 1979 boundary redistribution from the south halves of the electoral districts of Calgary-Glenmore and Calgary-Egmont.

The district has been represented by only three MLA's since 1979. The first was Progressive Conservative William Payne who served here from 1979 to 1993 and the second is Heather Forsyth who has represented the district since 1993 was first elected under the Progressive Conservative banner but crossed the floor to the Wildrose Alliance in 2010. Forsyth was re-elected in the 2012 provincial election under the Wildrose banner. In 2015, Richard Gotfried was elected, as a Progressive Conservative.

== History ==
The electoral district of Calgary-Fisk Creek was created in the 1979 boundary redistribution from portions of old Calgary-Egmont and Calgary-Glenmore. The 2010 boundary redistribution moved the west boundary to 14th Street into Calgary-Lougheed to keep all of Canyon Meadows in a single district.

=== Boundary history ===
9 Calgary-Fish Creek 2003 boundaries
Bordering districts
North	East	West	South
Calgary-Egmont and Calgary-Glenmore	Calgary-Hays	Calgary-Lougheed and Calgary-Shaw	Calgary-Shaw
riding map goes here			
Legal description from the Statutes of Alberta 2003, Electoral Divisions Act.
Starting at the intersection of Elbow Drive SW with Anderson Road SW; then 1. east along Anderson Road SW and Anderson Road SE to Deerfoot Trail SE; 2. east along Deerfoot Trail SE to the right bank of the Bow River; 3. south along the right bank of the Bow River to Fish Creek; 4. northwest along Fish Creek to the intersection with Macleod Trail S; 5. north along Macleod Trail S to Canyon Meadows Drive SW; 6. northwest along Canyon Meadows Drive SW to Elbow Drive SW; 7. north along Elbow Drive SW to the starting point.
Note:

10 Calgary-Fish Creek 2010 boundaries
Bordering districts
North	East	West	South
Calgary-Acadia	Calgary-Hays	Calgary-Glenmore and Calgary-Lougheed	Calgary-Shaw
Legal description from the Statutes of Alberta 2010, Electoral Divisions Act.

=== Representation history ===
Members of the Legislative Assembly for Calgary-Fish Creek
Assembly	Years	Member	Party
See: Calgary-Egmont 1971-1979 and Calgary-Glenmore 1959-1979
19th	1979–1982	William Payne	Progressive Conservative
20th	1982–1986	William Payne	Progressive Conservative
21st	1986–1989	William Payne	Progressive Conservative
22nd	1989–1993	William Payne	Progressive Conservative
23rd	1993–1997	Heather Forsyth	Progressive Conservative
24th	1997–2001	Heather Forsyth	Progressive Conservative
25th	2001–2004	Heather Forsyth	Progressive Conservative
26th	2004–2008	Heather Forsyth	Progressive Conservative
27th	2008–2010	Heather Forsyth	Progressive Conservative
27th	2010–2012	Heather Forsyth	Wildrose Alliance
28th	2012–2015	Heather Forsyth	Wildrose
29th	2015–2017	Richard Gotfried	Progressive Conservative
29th	2017–2019	Richard Gotfried	United Conservative
30th	2019–2023	Richard Gotfried	United Conservative
31st	2023–	Myles McDougall	United Conservative

The electoral district was created in the 1979 boundary redistribution. The first election that year saw Progressive Conservative candidate William Payne win a landslide majority. Payne would almost double his popular vote in the 1982 general election, taking almost 80% of the total vote.

After the election Premier Peter Lougheed appointed Payne as a Minister without portfolio. Payne lost almost 10,000 votes running for his third term in office in the 1986 election. He still won the district with a landslide majority. After the election he was shuffled out of cabinet. He would run for his final election in 1989 and win his fourth term after facing a strong challenge from Liberal candidate Wayne Gillis. Payne retired at dissolution in 1993.

The second representative elected to the district was Heather Forsyth, who was elected in 1993 as Progressive Conservative candidate. She won a comfortable majority over Liberal candidate Marie Cameron to hold the seat for her party. Cameron and Forsyth would face each other in the 1997 general election with Forsyth winning a landslide. She would win her third term in 2001 with an even bigger landslide. After the election Premier Ralph Klein appointed Forsyth to the provincial cabinet as Solicitor General and Minister of Public Security.

Forsyth won her fourth term in the 2004 general election. After the election Klein shuffled her to the Children and Youth Services portfolio which she served until 2006. She won her fifth term in 2008. On January 4, 2010, Forsyth crossed the floor to the Wildrose Alliance. She was re-elected in the 2012 provincial election, and was one of only five Wildrose MLAs who chose not to cross the floor to the governing Progressive Conservatives along with Danielle Smith in 2014. She retired from politics in 2015.

In the 2015 election, Richard Gotfried picked up Calgary-Fish Creek for the Progressive Conservatives, despite a landslide defeat in the rest of the province. He subsequently joined the United Conservative Party when the two right-wing parties merged, and was re-elected in 2019.

== Legislative election results ==
=== 2023 ===
2023 Alberta general election
Party	Candidate	Votes	%	±%
United Conservative	Myles McDougall	13,743	53.77	-7.76
New Democratic	Rebecca Bounsall	11,254	44.03	+15.24
Liberal	Charlie Heater	378	1.48	+0.10
Solidarity Movement	Dave Hughes	186	0.73	–
Total		25,561	99.24	–
Rejected and declined		195	0.76	
Turnout		25,756	69.48	
Eligible voters		37,067		
United Conservative hold		Swing		-11.50
Source(s) Source: Elections Alberta

=== 2019 ===
2019 Alberta general election
Party	Candidate	Votes	%	±%	Expenditures
United Conservative	Richard Gotfried	15,975	61.52	-1.64	$64,738
New Democratic	Rebecca Bounsall	7,476	28.79	-1.85	$46,721
Alberta Party	Robert Tremblay	1,699	6.54	+2.16	$1,077
Liberal	John Roggeveen	359	1.38	+0.11	$500
Green	Taylor Stasila	231	0.89	–	$500
Alberta Independence	Tomas Manasek	226	0.87	–	$937
Total		25,966	99.58	–	
Rejected, spoiled and declined		109	0.42		
Turnout		26,075	72.11		
Eligible voters		36,158			
United Conservative notional hold		Swing		+0.11	
Source(s) Source: Elections Alberta Note: Expenses is the sum of "Election Expenses", "Other Expenses" and "Transfers Issued". The Elections Act limits "Election Expenses" to $50,000.

=== 2015 ===
2015 Alberta general election
Party	Candidate	Votes	%	±%
Progressive Conservative	Richard Gotfried	6,198	32.91%	-10.81%
New Democratic	Jill Moreton	6,069	32.23%	27.11%
Wildrose	Blaine Maller	5,568	29.57%	-14.57%
Alberta Party	Allison Wemyss	850	4.51%	–
Social Credit	Martin Owen	148	0.79%	–
Total		18,833	–	–
Rejected, spoiled and declined		36	27	6
Eligible electors / turnout		30,931	61.02%	-0.05%
Progressive Conservative gain from Wildrose Alliance		Swing		0.23%
Source(s) Source: "10 - Calgary-Fish Creek, 2015 Alberta general election". officialresults.elections.ab.ca. Elections Alberta. Chief Electoral Officer (2016). 2015 General Election. A Report of the Chief Electoral Officer (PDF) (Report). Edmonton, Alta.: Elections Alberta.

2015 Alberta general election redistributed results
Party	Votes	%
Progressive Conservative	7,683	32.82
New Democratic	7,173	30.64
Wildrose	7,103	30.34
Alberta Party	1,027	4.39
Liberal	297	1.27
Social Credit	127	0.54
Source(s) Source: Ridingbuilder

=== 2012 ===
2012 Alberta general election
Party	Candidate	Votes	%	±%
Wildrose Alliance	Heather Forsyth	7,672	43.94%	34.36%
Progressive Conservative	Wendelin Fraser	7,634	43.72%	-8.58%
Liberal	Nazir Rahemtulla	1,260	7.22%	-23.46%
New Democratic	Eric Leavitt	894	5.12%	1.91%
Total		17,460	–	–
Rejected, spoiled and declined		47	73	2
Eligible electors / turnout		28,668	61.08%	14.31%
Wildrose Alliance gain from Progressive Conservative		Swing		-10.70%
Source(s) Source: "10 - Calgary-Fish Creek, 2012 Alberta general election". officialresults.elections.ab.ca. Elections Alberta. Chief Electoral Officer (2012). The Report of the Chief Electoral Officer on the 2011 Provincial Enumeration and Monday, April 23, 2012 Provincial General Election of the Twenty-eighth Legislative Assembly (PDF) (Report). Edmonton, Alta.: Elections Alberta. Archived (PDF) from the original on May 6, 2021.

=== 2008 ===
2008 Alberta general election
Party	Candidate	Votes	%	±%
Progressive Conservative	Heather Forsyth	6,884	52.30%	-5.53%
Liberal	Laura Shutiak	4,038	30.68%	6.59%
Wildrose Alliance	Jamie Buchan	1,261	9.58%	2.97%
Green	Kerry T. Fraser	556	4.22%	-0.53%
New Democratic	Eric Leavitt	423	3.21%	-3.50%
Total		13,162	–	–
Rejected, spoiled and declined		26	13	2
Eligible electors / turnout		28,203	46.77%	1.50%
Progressive Conservative hold		Swing		-6.06%
Source(s) Source: "09 - Calgary-Fish Creek, 2008 Alberta general election". officialresults.elections.ab.ca. Elections Alberta. Chief Electoral Officer (2008). The Report on the March 3, 2008 Provincial General Election of the Twenty-Seventh Legislative Assembly (Report). Edmonton, Alta.: Elections Alberta. pp. 202–205.

=== 2004 ===
2004 Alberta general election
Party	Candidate	Votes	%	±%
Progressive Conservative	Heather Forsyth	6,829	57.83%	-16.71%
Liberal	Tore Badenduck	2,845	24.09%	2.20%
New Democratic	Eric Leavitt	793	6.72%	3.15%
Alberta Alliance	Mike Kuipers	781	6.61%	–
Green	Chris Sealy	561	4.75%	–
Total		11,809	–	–
Rejected, spoiled and declined		37	12	3
Eligible electors / turnout		26,174	45.27%	-12.64%
Progressive Conservative hold		Swing		-9.46%
Source(s) Source: "00 - Calgary-Fish Creek, 2004 Alberta general election". officialresults.elections.ab.ca. Elections Alberta. Alberta. Chief Electoral Officer (2005). Report of the Chief Electoral Officer on the General Enumeration and General Election of the Twenty-sixth Legislative Assembly (Report). Edmonton: Alberta Legislative Assembly, Office of the Chief Electoral Officer.

=== 2001 ===
2001 Alberta general election
Party	Candidate	Votes	%	±%
Progressive Conservative	Heather Forsyth	9,716	74.54%	7.93%
Liberal	Marc Doll	2,853	21.89%	-2.43%
New Democratic	Ryan Todd	465	3.57%	0.77%
Total		13,034	–	–
Rejected, spoiled and declined		24	23	3
Eligible electors / turnout		22,554	57.91%	3.07%
Progressive Conservative hold		Swing		5.18%
Source(s) Source: "Calgary-Fish Creek Official Results 2001 Alberta general election". Alberta Heritage Community Foundation. Alberta. Chief Electoral Officer (2001). The report of the Chief Electoral Officer on the 2000 provincial confirmation process and Monday, March 12, 2001, Provincial General Election of the twenty-fifth Legislative Assembly. Edmonton: Alberta Legislative Assembly, Office of the Chief Electoral Officer.

=== 1997 ===
1997 Alberta general election
Party	Candidate	Votes	%	±%
Progressive Conservative	Heather Forsyth	8,274	66.62%	11.97%
Liberal	Marie Cameron	3,020	24.32%	-12.88%
Social Credit	Jeff Willerton	778	6.26%	–
New Democratic	Muriel Turner-Wilkinson	348	2.80%	-1.08%
Total		12,420	–	–
Rejected, spoiled and declined		27	5	0
Eligible electors / turnout		22,697	54.84%	-9.27%
Progressive Conservative hold		Swing		12.42%
Source(s) Source: "Calgary-Fish Creek Official Results 1997 Alberta general election". Alberta Heritage Community Foundation. Alberta. Chief Electoral Officer (1997). Report of the Chief Electoral Officer, November, 1996 general enumeration and Tuesday, March 11, 1997 general election Twenty-fourth Legislative Assembly. Edmonton: Alberta Legislative Assembly, Office of the Chief Electoral Officer.

=== 1993 ===
1993 Alberta general election
Party	Candidate	Votes	%	±%
Progressive Conservative	Heather Forsyth	7,855	54.65%	6.68%
Liberal	Marie Cameron	5,346	37.19%	-0.63%
New Democratic	Kerin Spaargaren	558	3.88%	-10.32%
Independent	Roy Carey	544	3.78%	–
Natural Law	Darlene Holt	70	0.49%	–
Total		14,373	–	–
Rejected, spoiled and declined		18	–	–
Eligible electors / turnout		22,447	64.11%	16.69%
Progressive Conservative hold		Swing		3.66%
Source(s) Source: "Calgary-Fish Creek Official Results 1993 Alberta general election". Alberta Heritage Community Foundation.

=== 1989 ===
1989 Alberta general election
Party	Candidate	Votes	%	±%
Progressive Conservative	William Edward Payne	6,996	47.97%	-21.60%
Liberal	Wayne Gillis	5,517	37.83%	24.07%
New Democratic	Tom Polmear	2,071	14.20%	-2.47%
Total		14,584	–	–
Rejected, spoiled and declined		35	–	–
Eligible electors / Turnout		30,831	47.42%	5.54%
Progressive Conservative hold		Swing		-21.38%
Source(s) Source: "Calgary-Fish Creek Official Results 1989 Alberta general election". Alberta Heritage Community Foundation.

=== 1986 ===
1986 Alberta general election
Party	Candidate	Votes	%	±%
Progressive Conservative	William Edward Payne	7,852	69.57%	-10.18%
New Democratic	Kerin Spaargaren	1,882	16.67%	9.78%
Liberal	Lea Russell	1,553	13.76%	10.73%
Total		11,287	–	–
Rejected, spoiled and declined		26	–	–
Eligible electors / Turnout		27,018	41.87%	-23.62%
Progressive Conservative hold		Swing		-8.26%
Source(s) Source: "Calgary-Fish Creek Official Results 1986 Alberta general election". Alberta Heritage Community Foundation.

=== 1982 ===
1982 Alberta general election
Party	Candidate	Votes	%	±%
Progressive Conservative	William Edward Payne	17,376	79.75%	3.72%
Western Canada Concept	Byron L. Chenger	2252	10.34%	–
New Democratic	Tom Polmear	1501	6.89%	2.91%
Liberal	Alan D.J. Sopczak	659	3.02%	-7.11%
Total		21,788	–	–
Rejected, spoiled and declined		34	–	–
Eligible electors / Turnout		33,321	65.49%	5.43%
Progressive Conservative hold		Swing		1.76%
Source(s) Source: "Calgary-Fish Creek Official Results 1982 Alberta general election". Alberta Heritage Community Foundation.

=== 1979 ===
1979 Alberta general election
Party	Candidate	Votes	%	±%
Progressive Conservative	William Edward Payne	9,187	76.03%	–
Liberal	Jerry Sykes	1,225	10.14%	–
Social Credit	Al Green	1,190	9.85%	–
New Democratic	Margaret Young	481	3.98%	–
Total		12,083	–	–
Rejected, spoiled and declined		15	–	–
Eligible electors / Turnout		20,144	60.06%	–
Progressive Conservative pickup new district.				
Source(s) Source: "Calgary-Fish Creek Official Results 1979 Alberta general election". Alberta Heritage Community Foundation.

== Senate nominee election results ==
=== 2004 ===
2004 Senate Nominee Election results: Calgary-Fish Creek				Turnout 45.30%	
Affiliation	Candidate	Votes	% votes	% ballots	Rank
Progressive Conservative	Bert Brown	5,485	18.13%	55.46%	1
Progressive Conservative	Jim Silye	4,647	15.36%	46.98%	5
Progressive Conservative	Betty Unger	4,210	13.92%	42.56%	2
Independent	Link Byfield	2,944	9.73%	29.76%	4
Progressive Conservative	David Usherwood	2,924	9.67%	29.56%	6
Progressive Conservative	Cliff Breitkreuz	2,864	9.47%	28.95%	3
Independent	Tom Sindlinger	1,994	6.59%	20.16%	9
Alberta Alliance	Vance Gough	1,886	6.24%	19.06%	8
Alberta Alliance	Michael Roth	1,728	5.71%	17.47%	7
Alberta Alliance	Gary Horan	1,565	5.18%	15.82%	10
Total votes		30,247	100%		
Total ballots		9,891	3.06 votes per ballot		
Rejected, spoiled and declined		1,966			
26,174 eligible electors

Voters had the option of selecting four candidates on the ballot

== Nomination contests ==
UCP Calgary-Fish Creek nomination contest: February 23, 2023

Candidate	Round 1		Round 2	
Candidate	Votes	%	Votes	%
Myles McDougall	591	46.9	743	63.3
Dave Guenter	376	29.8	430	36.7
Christina Steed	293	23.3	Eliminated	
Total	1,260	100.0	1,173	100.0

== Student vote results ==
=== 2012 ===
2012 Student Vote Canada results for Alberta
Affiliation	Candidate	Votes	%
Wildrose	Heather Forsyth	80	33.76%
Liberal	Nazir Rahemtulla	54	22.78%
Progressive Conservative	Wendelin Fraser	53	22.36%
NDP	Eric Leavitt	50	21.10%
Total		237	100%

== See also ==
- List of Alberta provincial electoral districts
- Canadian provincial electoral districts
