= Heather Forsyth =

Canadian politician

The Honourable Heather Forsyth ECA
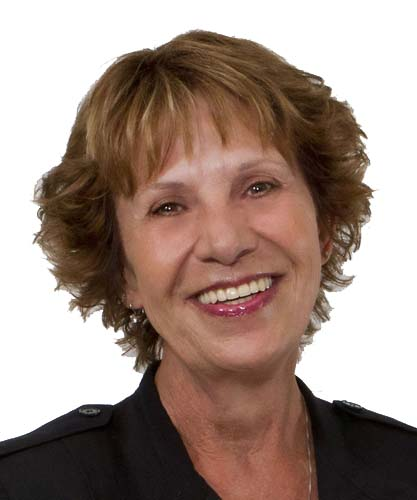
- Forsyth in 2012

Leader of the Opposition of Alberta
- In office December 22, 2014 – May 5, 2015
- Preceded by: Danielle Smith
- Succeeded by: Brian Jean

Leader of the Wildrose Party
- In office December 22, 2014 – March 28, 2015
- Preceded by: Danielle Smith
- Succeeded by: Brian Jean
Alberta Executive Council
Minister of Children's Services
In office November 25, 2004 – December 15, 2006
| Premier | Ralph Klein |
| Preceded by | Iris Evans |
| Succeeded by | Janis Tarchuk |
Solicitor General and Minister of Public Security
In office March 16, 2001 – November 25, 2004
| Premier | Ralph Klein |
| Preceded by | Steve West (1992) |
| Succeeded by | Harvey Cenaiko |

Member of the Legislative Assembly of Alberta for Calgary-Fish Creek
- In office June 15, 1993 – May 5, 2015
- Preceded by: William Edward Payne
- Succeeded by: Richard Gotfried

Personal details
- Born: Heather Mae Forsyth; August 1, 1950 (age 75) Saskatoon, Saskatchewan, Canada
- Party: Conservative
- Other political affiliations: Wildrose (2010–2015); Progressive Conservative (1993–2010)
- Occupation: Politician

Heather Mae Forsyth ECA (born August 1, 1950) is a former Canadian politician. She was named interim leader of the Wildrose Party on December 22, 2014, following the defection of the previous leader, Danielle Smith, and eight other MLAs. Forsyth is a former member of the Legislative Assembly of Alberta representing the constituency of Calgary-Fish Creek as a Wildrose Alliance representative. She was a Progressive Conservative until she crossed the floor on January 4, 2010. In the 2012 Alberta general election, Forsyth was reelected along with 16 other Wildrose MLAs to form the Official Opposition. Wildrose Leader Danielle Smith then appointed Forsyth as Health Critic. Forsyth retired from Alberta politics in 2015 after her stint as interim leader of the Wildrose Party.

== Political career ==
Heather Forsyth was first elected on June 15, 1993, and served for a total of 21 years, 10 months and 21 days. She spent the entire length of her political career representing the Calgary-Fish Creek constituency. Forsyth was a member of the Progressive Conservative party from June 15, 1993, until January 4, 2010, until she crossed the floor to the Wildrose Party, which she remained a part of until her retirement in 2015. While in office, she served as member, chair and deputy chair of numerous standing committees, 56 in total. Forsyth also held positions such as Critic for Service Alberta, Health, Critic for Culture and Community Services, Critic for Employment and Immigration, Critic for Health and Wellness as well as Critic for Seniors. Forsyth also held the position of Solicitor General from March 19, 2001, until November 24, 2004, and was Minister of Children's Services from November 25, 2004, until December 14, 2006.

In 1997, Forsyth led the Task Force on Children Involved in Prostitution and helped submit a report that recommended changes to the Child Welfare Act entitled, Children Involved In Prostitution: Report by The Task Force on Children Involved in Prostitution. In 2000, Forsyth was chair of the Alberta Advisory Committee on Organ and Tissue Donation and Transplantation and was involved with the report entitled A Framework for Action: A Coordinated and Integrated Organ and Tissue Donation and Transplant System for Alberta. In 2007, Forsyth led the Crime Reduction and Safe Communities Task Force as chair and submitted the report entitled Keeping Communities Safe: Report and Recommendations.

Forsyth was successful in winning 6 elections over her political career. Typically, Forsyth was elected with substantial leads over her opponents but notably, one of her narrowest victories occurred in the 2012 Alberta general election, where she edged out her main competitor from the Progressive Conservative Party, Wendelin Fraser, by a count of 38 votes. Forsyth is perhaps best known for being named Interim Leader of the Wildrose Party, which occurred after the departure of former Wildrose leader, Danielle Smith and nine other former Wildrose MLAs to the Progressive Conservative party. At the time, Forsyth knew that she would not be seeking reelection due to family reasons, but said that she would be willing to offer her leadership until the next election that would eventually take place on May 5, 2015.

== Charity work ==
Heather Forsyth is also known for her charity golf tournament: The Peanut Butter Classic. The tournament is an annual women's charity golf tournament. Forsyth founded the charity, which collects and donates jars of peanut butter for the Calgary Food Bank in 2003. Since its foundation, the Peanut Butter Classic has also raised over 1.7 million dollars for charities in the Calgary area including Alcove, an addictions recovery centre for women that offers accommodations for women and children to keep them together. The charity is entirely oranzized and operated by volunteers. Calgary firefighters have been involved in volunteering at the event since its earliest days. The tournament gives 98% of its proceeds to charity.

== Election results ==
1993 Alberta general election: Calgary-Fish Creek
| Party | Candidate | Votes | % | ±% |
|---|---|---|---|---|
| Progressive Conservative | Heather Forsyth | 7,855 | 54.65% | 6.68% |
| Liberal | Marie Cameron | 5,346 | 37.19% | -0.63% |
| New Democratic | Kerin Spaargaren | 558 | 3.88% | -10.32% |
| Independent | Roy Carey | 544 | 3.78% | – |
| Natural Law | Darlene Holt | 70 | 0.49% | – |
| Total | | 14,373 | – | – |
| Rejected, spoiled and declined | | 18 | – | – |
| Eligible electors / turnout | | 22,447 | 64.11% | 16.69% |
| Progressive Conservative hold | | Swing | | 3.66% |
Source(s) Source: "Calgary-Fish Creek Official Results 1993 Alberta general election". Alberta Heritage Community Foundation.

1997 Alberta general election: Calgary-Fish Creek
| Party | Candidate | Votes | % | ±% |
|---|---|---|---|---|
| Progressive Conservative | Heather Forsyth | 8,274 | 66.62% | 11.97% |
| Liberal | Marie Cameron | 3,020 | 24.32% | -12.88% |
| Social Credit | Jeff Willerton | 778 | 6.26% | – |
| New Democratic | Muriel Turner-Wilkinson | 348 | 2.80% | -1.08% |
| Total | | 12,420 | – | – |
| Rejected, spoiled and declined | | 27 | 5 | 0 |
| Eligible electors / turnout | | 22,697 | 54.84% | -9.27% |
| Progressive Conservative hold | | Swing | | 12.42% |
Source(s) Source: "Calgary-Fish Creek Official Results 1997 Alberta general election". Alberta Heritage Community Foundation. Alberta. Chief Electoral Officer (1997). Report of the Chief Electoral Officer, November, 1996 general enumeration and Tuesday, March 11, 1997 general election Twenty-fourth Legislative Assembly. Edmonton: Alberta Legislative Assembly, Office of the Chief Electoral Officer.

2001 Alberta general election: Calgary-Fish Creek
| Party | Candidate | Votes | % | ±% |
|---|---|---|---|---|
| Progressive Conservative | Heather Forsyth | 9,716 | 74.54% | 7.93% |
| Liberal | Marc Doll | 2,853 | 21.89% | -2.43% |
| New Democratic | Ryan Todd | 465 | 3.57% | 0.77% |
| Total | | 13,034 | – | – |
| Rejected, spoiled and declined | | 24 | 23 | 3 |
| Eligible electors / turnout | | 22,554 | 57.91% | 3.07% |
| Progressive Conservative hold | | Swing | | 5.18% |
Source(s) Source: "Calgary-Fish Creek Official Results 2001 Alberta general election". Alberta Heritage Community Foundation. Alberta. Chief Electoral Officer (2001). The report of the Chief Electoral Officer on the 2000 provincial confirmation process and Monday, March 12, 2001, Provincial General Election of the twenty-fifth Legislative Assembly. Edmonton: Alberta Legislative Assembly, Office of the Chief Electoral Officer.

2004 Alberta general election: Calgary-Fish Creek
| Party | Candidate | Votes | % | ±% |
|---|---|---|---|---|
| Progressive Conservative | Heather Forsyth | 6,829 | 57.83% | -16.71% |
| Liberal | Tore Badenduck | 2,845 | 24.09% | 2.20% |
| New Democratic | Eric Leavitt | 793 | 6.72% | 3.15% |
| Alberta Alliance | Mike Kuipers | 781 | 6.61% | – |
| Green | Chris Sealy | 561 | 4.75% | – |
| Total | | 11,809 | – | – |
| Rejected, spoiled and declined | | 37 | 12 | 3 |
| Eligible electors / turnout | | 26,174 | 45.27% | -12.64% |
| Progressive Conservative hold | | Swing | | -9.46% |
Source(s) Source: "00 - Calgary-Fish Creek, 2004 Alberta general election". officialresults.elections.ab.ca. Elections Alberta. Alberta. Chief Electoral Officer (2005). Report of the Chief Electoral Officer on the General Enumeration and General Election of the Twenty-sixth Legislative Assembly (Report). Edmonton: Alberta Legislative Assembly, Office of the Chief Electoral Officer.

2008 Alberta general election: Calgary-Fish Creek
| Party | Candidate | Votes | % | ±% |
|---|---|---|---|---|
| Progressive Conservative | Heather Forsyth | 6,884 | 52.30% | -5.53% |
| Liberal | Laura Shutiak | 4,038 | 30.68% | 6.59% |
| Wildrose Alliance | Jamie Buchan | 1,261 | 9.58% | 2.97% |
| Green | Kerry T. Fraser | 556 | 4.22% | -0.53% |
| New Democratic | Eric Leavitt | 423 | 3.21% | -3.50% |
| Total | | 13,162 | – | – |
| Rejected, spoiled and declined | | 26 | 13 | 2 |
| Eligible electors / turnout | | 28,203 | 46.77% | 1.50% |
| Progressive Conservative hold | | Swing | | -6.06% |
Source(s) Source: "09 - Calgary-Fish Creek, 2008 Alberta general election". officialresults.elections.ab.ca. Elections Alberta. Chief Electoral Officer (2008). The Report on the March 3, 2008 Provincial General Election of the Twenty-Seventh Legislative Assembly (Report). Edmonton, Alta.: Elections Alberta. pp. 202–205.

2012 Alberta general election: Calgary-Fish Creek
| Party | Candidate | Votes | % | ±% |
|---|---|---|---|---|
| Wildrose Alliance | Heather Forsyth | 7,672 | 43.94% | 34.36% |
| Progressive Conservative | Wendelin Fraser | 7,634 | 43.72% | -8.58% |
| Liberal | Nazir Rahemtulla | 1,260 | 7.22% | -23.46% |
| New Democratic | Eric Leavitt | 894 | 5.12% | 1.91% |
| Total | | 17,460 | – | – |
| Rejected, spoiled and declined | | 47 | 73 | 2 |
| Eligible electors / turnout | | 28,668 | 61.08% | 14.31% |
| Wildrose Alliance gain from Progressive Conservative | | Swing | | -10.70% |
Source(s) Source: "10 - Calgary-Fish Creek, 2012 Alberta general election". officialresults.elections.ab.ca. Elections Alberta. Chief Electoral Officer (2012). The Report of the Chief Electoral Officer on the 2011 Provincial Enumeration and Monday, April 23, 2012 Provincial General Election of the Twenty-eighth Legislative Assembly (PDF) (Report). Edmonton, Alta.: Elections Alberta. Archived (PDF) from the original on May 6, 2021.
