= Linda Johnson (politician) =

Canadian politician

MLA for Calgary-Glenmore
- In office April 23, 2012 – May 5, 2015
- Preceded by: Paul Hinman
- Succeeded by: Anam Kazim

Personal details
- Born: 1958 or 1959 (age 66–67) Halifax, Nova Scotia
- Party: Progressive Conservative

Linda Johnson (born c. 1959) is a Canadian politician who was an elected member to the Legislative Assembly of Alberta, representing the electoral district of Calgary-Glenmore, from 2012 to 2015.

Her interest in politics began during her high school days when she became active with the Progressive Conservative party. Her first involvement was as a volunteer for former MLA Dennis Anderson. She worked in Ottawa as an assistant to Harvie Andre, MP for Calgary-Centre. She returned to Calgary becoming constituency assistant for Jim Hawkes, MP for Calgary-West.

Johnson ran for the Calgary Ward 11 City Councilor seat in October 2017 but lost to Jeromy Farkas.

== Electoral record ==
2015 Alberta general election: Calgary-Glenmore
Party	Candidate	Votes	%	±%
New Democratic	Anam Kazim	7,021	33.18%	27.22%
Progressive Conservative	Linda Johnson	7,015	33.16%	-14.78%
Wildrose	Chris Kemp-Jackson	5,058	23.91%	-15.10%
Liberal	Dave Waddington	1,345	6.36%	-0.74%
Alberta Party	Terry Lo	719	3.40%	–
Total		21,158	–	–
Rejected, spoiled and declined		93	32	9
Eligible electors / turnout		37,109	57.29%	-1.72%
New Democratic gain from Progressive Conservative		Swing		-4.45%
Source(s) Source: "13 - Calgary-Glenmore, 2015 Alberta general election". officialresults.elections.ab.ca. Elections Alberta. Results shown following Judicial Recount.

2012 Alberta general election: Calgary-Glenmore
Party	Candidate	Votes	%	±%
Progressive Conservative	Linda Johnson	9,710	47.93%	22.03%
Wildrose	Paul Hinman	7,902	39.01%	2.14%
Liberal	Dan MacAuley	1,437	7.09%	-27.15%
New Democratic	Rick Collier	1,208	5.96%	4.62%
Total		20,257	–	–
Rejected, spoiled and declined		144	32	11
Eligible electors / turnout		34,592	59.01%	19.86%
Progressive Conservative gain from Wildrose		Swing		-4.29%
Source(s) Source: "13 - Calgary-Glenmore, 2012 Alberta general election". officialresults.elections.ab.ca. Elections Alberta.
