= United Conservative Party =

Political party in Alberta, Canada

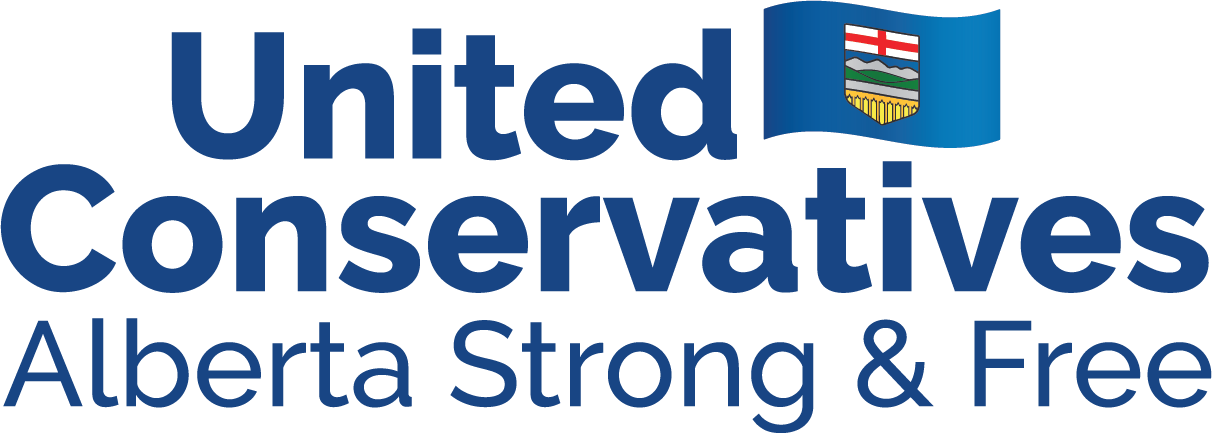
- Abbreviation: UCP
- Leader: Danielle Smith
- President: Rob Smith
- Executive Director: Dustin van Vugt
- Founder: Jason Kenney; Brian Jean
- Founded: July 31, 2017; 9 years ago
- Merger of: Progressive Conservative Party; Wildrose Party
- Headquarters: 203-2915 21 Street NE; Calgary, Alberta; T2E 7T1
- Membership (2024): ▼54,915
- Ideology: Conservatism (Canadian); Economic liberalism; Canadian federalism
- Political position: Centre-right to right-wing
- Legislative Assembly: 46 / 87

Website
- unitedconservative.ca

The United Conservative Party of Alberta (UCP; French: Parti conservateur uni de l'Alberta, PCU) is a conservative political party in Alberta, Canada. It was established in July 2017 as a merger between the Progressive Conservative Association of Alberta and the Wildrose Party. When established, the UCP immediately formed the Official Opposition in the Legislative Assembly of Alberta. The UCP won a majority mandate in the 2019 Alberta general election to form the government of Alberta, succeeding Rachel Notley's Alberta New Democratic Party (Alberta NDP). The party won a renewed majority mandate in the 2023 Alberta general election under the leadership of Danielle Smith – albeit the smallest majority mandate in Alberta's history.

== History ==
=== Origins ===
When the Alberta New Democratic Party's (NDP) won the 2015 Alberta general election, it ended an uninterrupted period in which the Progressive Conservative Association of Alberta had won provincial elections since 1971, under Premiers Peter Lougheed, Don Getty, Ralph Klein, Ed Stelmach, Alison Redford, Dave Hancock and Jim Prentice. No other government had served for that long at the provincial or federal level in Canadian history.

The Wildrose Party had formed in 2008 as a provincial political party in Alberta with the merger of the Alberta Alliance Party and the unregistered Wildrose Party of Alberta. Its members largely consisted of dissatisfied former Progressive Conservative supporters. Three of the first five Wildrose MLAs were defectors originally elected as Progressive Conservatives.

Danielle Smith, who served as leader of the Wildrose Party from October 2009 until December 2014, made an unsuccessful attempt to merge the Wildrose and the PC party by resigning from the Wildrose and crossing the floor to join the governing Progressive Conservative Association of Alberta caucus under then Premier Jim Prentice, along with eight other Wildrose MLAs. The remaining Wildrose Party refused to consider the request by Smith to dissolve their party. Then Wildrose President David Yager said at the time "This is not a merger in any way. It is capitulation." When the NDP won in 2015 an Edmonton Sun article blamed the mass Wildrose defections for the loss. In the wake of the historic loss, uniting the Wildrose and PC parties became a major issue.

In July 2016, federal MP and former minister Jason Kenney announced that he would seek the PC leadership on a platform of seeking a merger with the Wildrose. Kenney was elected PC leader on March 18, 2017. Negotiations between Wildrose leader Brian Jean and Kenney were successful; the merger agreement was released on May 18, 2017. The results of the July 22, 2017 internal votes on the merger agreement held by both parties supported the merger with 95% of Wildrose and PC members voting in favour.

A joint meeting of the PC and Wildrose caucuses was held on July 24, 2017, to elect Nathan Cooper, Wildrose MLA for Olds-Didsbury-Three Hills, as interim leader—and hence Leader of the Opposition— over Prasad Panda, Wildrose MLA for Calgary-Foothills, and Richard Gotfried, who at the time was PC MLA for Calgary-Fish Creek. As well, members of both caucuses approached the Speaker of the Legislative Assembly of Alberta and asked to be recognized as the United Conservative caucus.

Kenney and Jean selected six individuals each to sit on the interim executive board of the new party. Ed Ammar was elected as first chair of the party on July 24, 2017. Cooper also appointed two MLAs to the board as non-voting members. The new party was registered with Elections Alberta as of July 31, 2017.

Although it was generally understood that the PC and Wildrose merged to form the UCP, Alberta electoral law at the time did not permit parties to formally merge or transfer assets between each other. Thus, the PC and Wildrose legally continued to exist, while the UCP was legally reckoned as a newly created party. As a result, on July 24, 2017–the day the new UCP formally came into existence–Cooper and the UCP's interim leadership team formally assumed the leaderships of both the PC and Wildrose parties as well. Also on that date, all members in good standing of the PCs and Wildrose became members of the UCP, with all but a few members withdrawing their memberships in the merging parties. The PCs and Wildrose withdrew from any meaningful public presence, thus de facto dissolving them although they continued to exist on paper.

To maintain their registration and assets, both the PCs and Wildrose ran one paper candidate each in Edmonton-Strathcona (an NDP safe seat held at that time by NDP leader Rachel Notley). On February 7, 2020, after the UCP government passed legislation allowing parties to legally merge, Elections Alberta formally approved the merger of the PCs and Wildrose into the UCP, allowing the UCP to merge the legacy parties' assets and formally wind up their affairs.

=== Kenney leadership (2017–2022) ===
In July 2017, the Progressive Conservative Association of Alberta and the Wildrose Party merged to form the United Conservative Party under the leadership of Jason Kenney, a former cabinet member in the Stephen Harper government. Kenney had won the 2017 Progressive Conservative Association of Alberta leadership election on a platform of uniting the two parties. The leadership election held on October 28, 2017, resulted in former PC leader Jason Kenney defeating former Wildrose leader Brian Jean and Doug Schweitzer, a former aide to Jim Prentice, to become UCP leader. Kenney won more than 60% of the vote on the first ballot. Kenney successfully contested a by-election in Calgary-Lougheed on December 14, 2017, after incumbent MLA Dave Rodney resigned in order to give Kenney an opportunity to enter the Alberta legislature.

On March 16, 2019, it came to light that during the UCP leadership election campaign Jason Kenney's leadership campaign collaborated with fellow candidate Jeff Callaway's campaign to undermine the leadership campaign of former Wildrose party leader Brian Jean. A document prepared by Callaway's communication's manager describes how Kenney's campaign provided communications support as well as planned regular strategic direction throughout Callaway's campaign. The Alberta Elections Commissioner levied more than $200,000 in fines relating to the kamikaze campaign prior to the Elections Commissioner's termination by the UCP government and conclusion of open investigations.

The RCMP concluded their investigation into the 2017 UCP leadership race on March 8, 2024, and announced they found no evidence of wrongdoing.

The UCP won the 2019 provincial election with a large majority, mainly on the strength of a near-sweep of Calgary (where it won all but three seats) and rural Alberta (where it won all but one seat).

Under the Premiership of Jason Kenney, their first cabinet of the 30th Alberta Legislature was sworn in by lieutenant governor of Alberta, Lois Mitchell, on April 30, 2019.

Jason Kenney resigned as UCP leader on May 18, 2022, after getting 51.4% support in a leadership review vote. The 2022 United Conservative Party leadership election was held and was won by Danielle Smith.

=== Smith government (2022–present) ===
The UCP under Premier Danielle Smith was re-elected to government in the 2023 Alberta general election with a reduced majority. They lost their one seat in Edmonton to the NDP. The election campaign had been one of the closest in Alberta's history.

After having trailed the Alberta NDP in fundraising for several quarters, UCP broke provincial records by pulling in $10.4 million in 2023, ending the election year with over $1 million in the bank, while the opposition NDP was $624,000 in debt. In the first quarter of 2024, the UCP raised $2,263,767 compared to the NDP who raised $1,011,739.

== Policies ==
=== Economics ===
The UCP government indexes Alberta's income tax brackets to keep up with inflation. It has pledged to cut Alberta's provincial income tax by adding a new, lower bottom income tax bracket of 8% for the first C$60,000 of income earned (down from 10% on the first C$142,292 in 2023) and it cut Alberta's corporate tax rate from 12% to 8%. It also seeks to expand the Taxpayer Protection Act to make the consent of a majority of Albertans via a referendum a prerequisite for raising taxes. The UCP is against the former federal carbon tax.

=== Education ===
The UCP announced plans to raise diploma examinations to 50 per cent of students' final grades in 2019; however, the party cancelled the plans after substantial public backlash. Under Jason Kenney's premiership, the UCP provided substantially increased funds to charter schools.

Under Danielle Smith's premiership, the government has announced it is pursuing educational reforms including (but not limited to) making membership in the Alberta Teachers' Association optional for K-12 teachers, an opt-in system for sexual education, requiring parental consent for pronoun changes for students under 16 years of age and parental notification for students ages 16 and 17, and restrictions on female spaces/categories (sports, awards, bathrooms) to only female-born girls through the Fairness and Safety in Sport Act.

=== Energy and environment ===
The UCP plans to achieve carbon neutrality by 2050 by prioritizing clean energy production, optimization of Alberta's large oil and gas sector, and carbon capture technology over making large cuts to carbon production and emissions.

=== Healthcare ===
In 2025 Danielle Smith, the UPC Premier of Alberta, announced that Alberta Health Services would be split into four separate ministries, each with its own minister: Primary and Preventative Health Services, Hospital and Surgical Health Services, Mental Health and Addiction, and Assisted Living and Social Services, "congruent with the Government of Alberta’s plans to have more specialized agencies oversee the various pillars of healthcare."

=== LGBTQ rights ===
In 2024, under Danielle Smith, Alberta banned gender-affirming surgeries for minors under 18 in Alberta, and banned those under 16 with puberty blockers or hormone therapy.

=== Separatism ===
The UCP is officially a federalist party,, Danielle Smith reaffirmed the UCP's commitment to Canadian federalism and urged separatists within the UCP to "join a different party". Several separatist groups criticized Smith's remarks and pledged to have their supporters stay within the UCP.

== Leaders ==
Leader (Born-Died) Parliamentary seat while leader		Term of office	Tenure	Led party in elections	Ministries in office while leader
—	Hon. Nathan Cooper (b. 1968); MLA for Olds-Didsbury-Three Hills	July 24, 2017 – October 28, 2017	96 days (interim)		Notley; 17th (2015–2019)
1	Hon. Jason Kenney (b. 1968); MLA for Calgary-Lougheed; 18th Premier	October 28, 2017 – October 6, 2022	4 years, 343 days	30th (2019)	Notley; 17th (2015–2019)
1	Hon. Jason Kenney (b. 1968); MLA for Calgary-Lougheed; 18th Premier	October 28, 2017 – October 6, 2022	4 years, 343 days	30th (2019)	Kenney; 18th (2019–2022)
2	Hon. Danielle Smith (b. 1971); MLA for Brooks-Medicine Hat; 19th Premier	October 6, 2022 – present	4 years, 34 days	31st (2023)	Kenney; 18th (2019–2022)
2	Hon. Danielle Smith (b. 1971); MLA for Brooks-Medicine Hat; 19th Premier	October 6, 2022 – present	4 years, 34 days	31st (2023)	Smith; 19th (2022–present)

List of Deputy Leaders
No.	Deputy Leader	Term
1	Mike Ellis	July 25, 2017 – October 30, 2017
2	Leela Aheer	October 30, 2017 – July 8, 2021

== Election results ==
Election	Leader	Votes	%	Seats	+/–	Position	Status
2019	Jason Kenney	1,040,004	54.88	63 / 87	▲63	▲1st	Majority
2023	Danielle Smith	928,896	52.63	49 / 87	▼14	1st	Majority

== See also ==
- Wildrose Party
- Progressive Conservative Party of Alberta
- Conservative Party of Canada
- Reform Party of Canada
- List of premiers of Alberta

Preceded by Alberta New Democratic Party	Governing party of Alberta; 2019–present	Succeeded by
