= Pincher Creek-Macleod =

Defunct provincial electoral district in Alberta, Canada

Coordinates: 49.68°N 114.10°W

Alberta electoral district

Defunct provincial electoral district
- Legislature: Legislative Assembly of Alberta
- District created: 1993
- District abolished: 1997
- First contested: 1993
- Last contested: 1993

Pincher Creek-Macleod was a provincial electoral district in Alberta, Canada, mandated to return a single member to the Legislative Assembly of Alberta from 1993 to 1997.

== History ==
The Pincher Creek-Macleod electoral district was created in 1993, when Pincher Creek-Crowsnest merged with Macleod. In 1997 the riding changed names to Livingstone-Macleod.

The riding was situated in the rocky mountains and foothills of south-western Alberta and along the Alberta–British Columbia border.

== Election results ==
=== 1993 ===
1993 Alberta general election
Party	Candidate	Votes	%	±%
Progressive Conservative	David Coutts	4,843	45.50%	–
Liberal	Ernie Patterson	4,231	39.75%	–
New Democratic	Mike Dawson	930	8.74%	–
Independent	Susan Aris	640	6.01%	–
Total		10,644	–	–
Rejected, spoiled and declined		41	–	–
Eligible electors / Turnout		15,440	69.20%	–
Progressive Conservative pickup new district.				
Source(s) Source: "Pincher Creek-Macleod Official Results 1993 Alberta general election". Alberta Heritage Community Foundation.

== See also ==
- List of Alberta provincial electoral districts
- Canadian provincial electoral districts
