= 30th Alberta Legislature =

Canadian Legislative Assembly

- Majority parliament
- May. 21, 2019 – May. 1, 2023

Parliament leaders
- Premier: Jason Kenney; April 30, 2019 – October 11, 2022
- Danielle Smith; October 11, 2022 – present
- Cabinets: Kenney; Smith
- Leader of the Opposition: Rachel Notley; April 30, 2019 – June 24, 2024

Party caucuses
- Government: United Conservative Party
- Opposition: New Democratic Party

Legislative Assembly
- Speaker of the Assembly: Nathan Cooper; May 21, 2019 — May 13, 2025
- Government House leader: Jason Nixon; April 30, 2019 — October 23, 2022
- Joseph Schow; October 24, 2022 – present
- Opposition House leader: Deron Bilous; May 21, 2019 – February 24, 2020
- Heather Sweet; February 25, 2020 – February 7, 2021
- Christina Gray; February 8, 2021 – present
- Members: 87 MLA seats

Sovereign
- Monarch: Elizabeth II; 6 February 1952 – 8 September 2022
- Charles III; 8 September 2022 – present
- Lieutenant governor: Lois Mitchell; June 12, 2015 – August 26, 2020
- Salma Lakhani; August 26, 2020 – present

Sessions
- 1st session 22 May 2019 – 24 February 2020
- 2nd session 25 February 2020 – 21 February 2022
- 3rd session 22 February 2022 – 30 October 2022
- 4th session 29 November 2022 – 1 May 2023
← 29th	→ 31st

The 30th Alberta Legislative Assembly was constituted after the general election on April 16, 2019. The United Conservative Party (UCP), led by Jason Kenney, won a majority of seats and formed the government. The New Democrats, led by outgoing Premier Rachel Notley, won the second most seats and formed the official opposition. The premiership of Jason Kenney began on April 30, 2019, when Jason Kenney and his first cabinet were sworn in by Lieutenant Governor of Alberta, Lois Mitchell. On October 11, 2022, Kenney resigned, and Danielle Smith, the new leader of the UCP, was sworn in as premier by Lieutenant Governor Salma Lakhani. The 30th Legislature was dissolved on May 1, 2023, triggering a general election on May 29.

== First session ==
Among the legislation adopted during the first session of the 30th Legislature, An Act to Repeal the Carbon Tax (Bill 1) repealed the Climate Leadership Act and its carbon levy, Bill 2 amended the Employment Standards Code and the Labour Relations Code to change how overtime hours are calculated from time-and-a-half to straight time, reduced the minimum wage for workers aged 13 to 17 to $13 an hour (from $15 an hour) and changed rules for union certification processes, Bill 26 exempted the Labour Relations Code from applying to farming or ranching employees and exempted farms with less than five employees from the Employment Standards Code and the requirement to hold workplace insurance, Bill 8 replaced the School Act with the Education Act which, among other changes, included eliminating of certain protections of gay–straight alliances and eliminating the restriction on the number of charter schools that are permitted, and Bills 7 and 29 amended the Municipal Government Act to allow individual municipalities to offer tax deferrals or exemptions for the purpose of encouraging the development of non-residential properties. Bill 19 renamed the Climate Change and Emissions Management Act to the Emissions Management and Climate Resilience Act and established new rules for targets, prices and credits applicable to industrial emitters. Bill 22 was an omnibus bill that amended, repealed or enacted numerous acts and included the transferring of the Alberta Teachers' Retirement Fund and funds invested by the Workers Compensation Board to the Alberta Investment Management Corporation, dissolving the Office of the Election Commissioner and the Alberta Historical Resources Foundation, repealing the Alberta Sport Connection Act, Social Care Facilities Review Committee Act, the Alberta Competitiveness Act, and the Alberta Capital Finance Authority Act while enacting the Local Authorities Capital Financing Act. Bill 25, among other measures aimed at red tape reduction, repealed the Developmental Disabilities Foundation Act and the Small Power Research and Development Act, as well as dissolved the Health Professions Advisory Board, created provisions to allow digital signature to give consent for organ donation, and provided greater flexibility for the Glenbow Museum to loan out its collection.

Among financial measures, Bill 3 lowered the province's corporate tax rate from 12% to 8%, and Bill 12 created a 10-year freeze on oil and gas royalty rates for newly drilled wells. Legislative measures arising from the 2019 Alberta budget were implemented in Bills 20 and 21. Bill 20 repealed Edmonton's and Calgary's City Charters Fiscal Framework Act and replaced it with the new Local Government Fiscal Framework Act and the Public Transit and Green Infrastructure Project Act; repealed the Interactive Digital Media Tax Credit Act and replaced it with the Film and Television Tax Credit Act; repealed the Access to the Future Act regarding advanced education, the Alberta Cancer Prevention Legacy Act regarding cancer prevention, and the Investing in a Diversified Alberta Economy Act regarding tax credits for investment in small non-oil/gas-related businesses; eliminated the Environmental Protection and Enhancement Fund which was a security deposit fund for land reclamation resulting from industrial activities, and the Lottery Fund which had re-direct gaming revenue to charities; and raised tobacco taxes. Bill 21, among other measures, ended the province tuition freeze, increased student loan interest rates by 1%, ended indexation of the bottom tax bracket and of the Assured Income for the Severely Handicapped, and allows replacement workers to be used in the public sector.

In addition to the Public Sector Wage Arbitration Deferral Act (Bill 9), new acts that were created included the Red Tape Reduction Act (Bill 4) to require reports on government initiatives to prevent unnecessary regulatory and administrative requirements. The Fair Registration Practices Act (Bill 11) established the Fair Registration Practices Office to facilitate the use of foreign credentials within professional organizations, and the Alberta Indigenous Opportunities Corporation Act (Bill 14) established the Alberta Indigenous Opportunities Corporation to facilitate investment by indigenous groups in natural resource projects. The Opioid Damages and Health Care Costs Recovery Act (Bill 28) allowed Alberta to join British Columbia's class-action lawsuit against opioid manufacturers.

=== Private member's bills ===
Two Private member's bills were passed by the Alberta Legislature during the first session. United Conservative Party MLA Jackie Armstrong-Homeniuk's Protection of Students with Life-threatening Allergies Act (Bill 201) requires all publicly funded schools to have adrenalin autoinjectors (EpiPens) at the ready, should someone have an unexpected, life-threatening allergic reaction. Bill 201 received Royal Assent on June 28, 2019, and came into force on January 1, 2020.

UCP MLA Mike Ellis' Child, Youth and Family Enhancement (Protecting Alberta's Children) Amendment Act, 2019 (Bill 202, also known as Serenity's Law) built onto the previous legislated requirement for adults to report child abuse to a child welfare director, allowing an individual to report abuse to police and increasing the fines for failure to report from $2,000 to $10,000. The bill was proposed in response to the 2014 death of a four year old named Serenity who died after falling from a tire swing in Maskwacis, and a subsequent panel to investigate the province's child intervention system. Bill 202 received Royal Assent and came into force on October 30, 2019.

== Second session ==
The second session opened on February 25, 2020, with no changes to the Executive Council of Alberta. The session would soon be interrupted by the COVID-19 pandemic in Alberta and numerous health and COVID-related legislation would be adopted. Addressing the pandemic, the Tenancies Statutes (Emergency Provisions) Amendment Act, 2020 (Bill 11) and Commercial Tenancies Protection Act (Bill 23) prohibited residential and commercial evictions and rent increases; Public Health (Emergency Powers) Amendment Act, 2020 (Bill 10) and COVID-19 Pandemic Response Statutes Amendment Act, 2020 (Bill 24) gave any minister in the Executive Council the ability to make a law outside of the legislature (though this would be repealed in Bill 66), expanded certain powers held by the Minister of Health and the Chief Medical Officer to apply beyond public health emergencies, created a right to unpaid COVID-related leave for employees; Emergency Management Amendment Act, 2020 (No. 2) (Bill 13) created new offences related to price fixing, travel, and refusing to render expert aid or be conscripted during a state of emergency; Utility Payment Deferral Program Act (Bill 14) created an electricity and natural gas Utility Payment Deferral Program; Bill 70 provided liability protection to long-term care and supportive-living facilities and their employees; and Bill 71 inserted "COVID-19 Vaccination Leave" into the Employment Standards. Other health-related legislation included the Health Statutes Amendment Act, 2020 (Bill 30) that created regulations to allow for-profit corporations to charge the province for health services and conduct surgeries in private clinics, as well as bring the Health Quality Council under the direction of the Minister of Health. Bill 17 was adopted as the government's response to JH v Alberta Health Services that found several sections of the Mental Health Act to be unconstitutional. Bill 19 renamed the Tobacco and Smoking Reduction Act to the Tobacco, Smoking and Vaping Reduction Act and inserted new regulations to address vaping.

New acts created during the second session included the Critical Infrastructure Defence Act (Bill 1) which creates a definition of "essential infrastructure" and increases penalties for related trespassing (Trespass to Premises Act) and vandalism including warrantless arrests; the Protecting Survivors of Human Trafficking Act (Bill 8) which allows a court to issue a Human Trafficking Protection Order with conditions to protect victims; the Provincial Administrative Penalties Act (Bill 21) created SafeRoads AB and the Immediate Roadside Sanction program to administer penalties for impaired driving, rather than the court system; the Alberta Investment Attraction Act (Bill 33) created the Invest Alberta Corporation to promote investment activities; the Geothermal Resource Development Act (Bill 36) and the Mineral Resource Development Act (Bill 82) to expand the jurisdiction of the Alberta Energy Regulator to include geothermal-related activities and the mining of certain metals and minerals. the Financing Alberta's Strategic Transportation Act (Bill 43) to allow tolls to be used on roads and bridges; the Citizen Initiative Act (Bill 51) and Recall Act (Bill 52) to create mechanisms for citizens to petition for an initiative or recall election; the Freedom to Care Act (Bill 58) to create liability protection and regulatory exemptions that apply to volunteers doing unpaid work for non-profits; the Captive Insurance Companies Act (Bill 76) to legalize captive insurance and; the Trails Act (Bill 79) to regulate recreational trails on public lands.

Fiscal Measures and Taxation Act, 2020 (Bill 5) implemented the legislative amendments resulting from the 2020 budget, including extending the province's tourism levy to short-term rentals booked through online platforms. Bill 22 was an omnibus bill that addressed numerous topics aimed at "red tape reduction" and, among other items, repealed the Recreation Development Act, dissolved Energy Efficiency Alberta, and removed the restrictions that members of corporate or non-profit boards of directors, as well as applicants for grazing dispositions on public lands, be residents of Alberta. Bill 25 requires scrap metal dealers to report transactions of certain metals to police. Bill 2 ended prohibition in Cardston and Warner Counties. Bill 18 created the Alberta Parole Board to take over the responsibilities of the Parole Board of Canada while Bill 16 expanded the mandate of the Victims of Crime Fund to also include funding for initiatives that promote public safety. Bill 12 allows the Orphan Well Association to operate abandoned wells and pipelines. Concerning future elections, Bill 26 expanded the scope of what a provincial referendum can consider and increased the spending limits of third-party advertisers, while Bill 29 increased donation limits applicable to local government elections, extended the deadline for donation disclosure statements until after the election has occurred, and required unspent campaign funds be donated to a charity.

== Members of the 30th Assembly ==
	Member	Party	Electoral district	First elected / previously elected	No. of terms
|	Peter Guthrie	United Conservative	Airdrie-Cochrane	2019	1st term
	Angela Pitt	United Conservative	Airdrie-East	2015	2nd term
	Glenn van Dijken	United Conservative	Athabasca-Barrhead-Westlock	2015	2nd term
	Miranda Rosin	United Conservative	Banff-Kananaskis	2019	1st term
	Dave Hanson	United Conservative	Bonnyville-Cold Lake-St. Paul	2015	2nd term
	Michaela Frey (Until October 7, 2022)	United Conservative	Brooks-Medicine Hat	2019	1st term
	Danielle Smith (From November 8, 2022)	United Conservative	Brooks-Medicine Hat	2012, (Note: Highwood (first elected as a Wildrose)) 2022	2nd term*
	Tyler Shandro	United Conservative	Calgary-Acadia	2019	1st term
	Josephine Pon	United Conservative	Calgary-Beddington	2019	1st term
	Demetrios Nicolaides	United Conservative	Calgary-Bow	2019	1st term
	Joe Ceci	New Democrat	Calgary-Buffalo	2015	2nd term
	Mickey Amery	United Conservative	Calgary-Cross	2019	1st term
	Nicholas Milliken	United Conservative	Calgary-Currie	2019	1st term
	Peter Singh	United Conservative	Calgary-East	2019	1st term
	Prasad Panda	United Conservative	Calgary-Edgemont	2015	2nd term
	Doug Schweitzer	United Conservative	Calgary-Elbow	2019	1st term
	Vacant (2022–2023)		Calgary-Elbow	2019	1st term
	Devinder Toor	United Conservative	Calgary-Falconridge	2019	1st term
	Richard Gotfried	United Conservative	Calgary-Fish Creek	2015	2nd term
	Jason Luan	United Conservative	Calgary-Foothills	2012, (Note: Calgary-Hawkwood (first elected as Progressive Conservative)) 2019	2nd term*
	Whitney Issik	United Conservative	Calgary-Glenmore	2019	1st term
	Ric McIver	United Conservative	Calgary-Hays	2012	3rd term
	Jeremy Nixon	United Conservative	Calgary-Klein	2019	1st term
	Jason Kenney	United Conservative	Calgary-Lougheed	2017	2nd term
	Vacant (2022–2023)		Calgary-Lougheed	2017	2nd term
	Irfan Sabir	New Democrat	Calgary-McCall	2015	2nd term
	Kathleen Ganley	New Democrat	Calgary-Mountain View	2015	2nd term
	Muhammad Yaseen	United Conservative	Calgary-North	2019	1st term
	Rajan Sawhney	United Conservative	Calgary-North East	2019	1st term
	Sonya Savage	United Conservative	Calgary-North West	2019	1st term
	Tanya Fir	United Conservative	Calgary-Peigan	2019	1st term
	Rebecca Schulz	United Conservative	Calgary-Shaw	2019	1st term
	Matt Jones	United Conservative	Calgary-South East	2019	1st term
	Jason Copping	United Conservative	Calgary-Varsity	2019	1st term
	Mike Ellis	United Conservative	Calgary-West	2014	3rd term
	Jackie Lovely	United Conservative	Camrose	2019	1st term
	Joseph Schow	United Conservative	Cardston-Siksika	2019	1st term
	Todd Loewen	United Conservative	Central Peace-Notley	2015	2nd term
	Todd Loewen	Independent	Central Peace-Notley	2015	2nd term
	Todd Loewen	United Conservative	Central Peace-Notley	2015	2nd term
	Leela Aheer	United Conservative	Chestermere-Strathmore	2015	2nd term
	Drew Barnes	United Conservative	Cypress-Medicine Hat	2012	3rd term
	Drew Barnes	Independent	Cypress-Medicine Hat	2012	3rd term
	Mark Smith	United Conservative	Drayton Valley-Devon	2015	2nd term
	Nate Horner	United Conservative	Drumheller-Stettler	2019	1st term
	Deron Bilous	New Democrat	Edmonton-Beverly-Clareview	2012	3rd term
	Nicole Goehring	New Democrat	Edmonton-Castle Downs	2015	2nd term
	David Shepherd	New Democrat	Edmonton-City Centre	2015	2nd term
	Chris Nielsen	New Democrat	Edmonton-Decore	2015	2nd term
	Rod Loyola	New Democrat	Edmonton-Ellerslie	2015	2nd term
	Sarah Hoffman	New Democrat	Edmonton-Glenora	2015	2nd term
	Marlin Schmidt	New Democrat	Edmonton-Gold Bar	2015	2nd term
	Janis Irwin	New Democrat	Edmonton-Highlands-Norwood	2019	1st term
	Heather Sweet	New Democrat	Edmonton-Manning	2015	2nd term
	Lorne Dach	New Democrat	Edmonton-McClung	2015	2nd term
	Jasvir Deol	New Democrat	Edmonton-Meadows	2019	1st term
	Christina Gray	New Democrat	Edmonton-Mill Woods	2015	2nd term
	David Eggen	New Democrat	Edmonton-North West	2004, 2012	4th term*
	Lori Sigurdson	New Democrat	Edmonton-Riverview	2015	2nd term
	Richard Feehan	New Democrat	Edmonton-Rutherford	2015	2nd term
	Thomas Dang	New Democrat	Edmonton-South	2015	2nd term
	Thomas Dang	Independent	Edmonton-South	2015	2nd term
	Kaycee Madu	United Conservative	Edmonton-South West	2019	1st term
	Rachel Notley	New Democrat	Edmonton-Strathcona	2008	4th term
	Jon Carson	New Democrat	Edmonton-West Henday	2015	2nd term
	Rakhi Pancholi	New Democrat	Edmonton-Whitemud	2019	1st term
	Laila Goodridge (Until August 15, 2021)	United Conservative	Fort McMurray-Lac La Biche	2018	2nd term
	Brian Jean (From March 15, 2022)	United Conservative	Fort McMurray-Lac La Biche	2015, (Note: First elected as a Wildrose) 2022	2nd term*
	Tany Yao	United Conservative	Fort McMurray-Wood Buffalo	2015	2nd term
	Jackie Armstrong-Homeniuk	United Conservative	Fort Saskatchewan-Vegreville	2019	1st term
	Tracy Allard	United Conservative	Grande Prairie	2019	1st term
	Travis Toews	United Conservative	Grande Prairie-Wapiti	2019	1st term
	RJ Sigurdson	United Conservative	Highwood	2019	1st term
	Devin Dreeshen	United Conservative	Innisfail-Sylvan Lake	2018	2nd term
	Shane Getson	United Conservative	Lac Ste. Anne-Parkland	2019	1st term
	Ron Orr	United Conservative	Lacombe-Ponoka	2015	2nd term
	Brad Rutherford	United Conservative	Leduc-Beaumont	2019	1st term
	Pat Rehn	United Conservative	Lesser Slave Lake	2019	1st term
	Pat Rehn	Independent	Lesser Slave Lake	2019	1st term
	Pat Rehn	United Conservative	Lesser Slave Lake	2019	1st term
	Nathan Neudorf	United Conservative	Lethbridge-East	2019	1st term
	Shannon Phillips	New Democrat	Lethbridge-West	2015	2nd term
	Roger Reid	United Conservative	Livingstone-Macleod	2019	1st term
	Rick Wilson	United Conservative	Maskwacis-Wetaskiwin	2019	1st term
	Dale Nally	United Conservative	Morinville-St. Albert	2019	1st term
	Nathan Cooper	United Conservative	Olds-Didsbury-Three Hills	2015	2nd term
	Dan Williams	United Conservative	Peace River	2019	1st term
	Adriana LaGrange	United Conservative	Red Deer-North	2019	1st term
	Jason Stephan	United Conservative	Red Deer-South	2019	1st term
	Jason Nixon	United Conservative	Rimbey-Rocky Mountain House-Sundre	2015	2nd term
	Jordan Walker	United Conservative	Sherwood Park	2019	1st term
	Searle Turton	United Conservative	Spruce Grove-Stony Plain	2019	1st term
	Marie Renaud	New Democrat	St. Albert	2015	2nd term
	Nate Glubish	United Conservative	Strathcona-Sherwood Park	2019	1st term
	Grant Hunter	United Conservative	Taber-Warner	2015	2nd term
	Garth Rowswell	United Conservative	Vermilion-Lloydminster-Wainwright	2019	1st term
	Martin Long	United Conservative	West Yellowhead	2019	1st term

== Seating plan ==
		M. Smith	Rowswell				Carson	Dach	Schmidt	Deol		Bilous	Nielsen	Feehan
		Aheer	Turton	Long	Walker		Loyola	L. Sigurdson	Ganley	Eggen		Irwin	Pancholi	Renaud				Dang
		Pitt	Reid	Rehn	Orr		Shepherd	Sweet	Phillips	Gray	Notley	Ceci	Hoffman	Sabir	Goehring			Barnes
Cooper
		Shandro	Copping	Loewen	Savage	Guthrie	Dreeshen	Neudorf	Schow	D. Smith	Madu	Toews	LaGrange	Glubish	Sawhney	Ellis	Jean	Wilson
		Yao	Toor	Horner	Nicolaides	Amery	Hanson	Williams	Rutherford		Jones	Schulz	Luan	Jer. Nixon	Nally	Milliken	McIver	Armstong-Homeniuk
	Gotfried	Issik	Fir	Pon	Stephan	Hunter	Singh	Lovely	Allard		Getson	Rosin	RJ Sigurdson	Yaseen		Panda	van Dijken	Jas. Nixon

== By-elections ==
By-election	Date	Incumbent	Party	Winner	Party	Cause	Retained
Brooks-Medicine Hat	November 8, 2022	Michaela Frey	United Conservative	Danielle Smith	United Conservative	Resigned to provide a seat for new UCP leader and Premier of Alberta, Danielle Smith.	Yes
Fort McMurray-Lac La Biche	March 15, 2022	Laila Goodridge	United Conservative	Brian Jean	United Conservative	Resigned to run federally in Fort McMurray—Cold Lake; elected.	Yes
