= Barb Miller =

Canadian politician

Member of the Legislative Assembly of Alberta for Red Deer-South
- In office May 5, 2015 – March 19, 2019
- Preceded by: Cal Dallas
- Succeeded by: Jason Stephan

Personal details
- Born: 1958 or 1959 (age 66–67) Edmonton, Alberta
- Party: Alberta New Democratic Party
- Occupation: Union shop steward, cashier

Barbara Miller (born 1958 or 1959) is a Canadian politician who was elected in the 2015 Alberta general election to the Legislative Assembly of Alberta representing the electoral district of Red Deer-South. She was the president of the Red Deer and District Labour Council and a cashier for Safeway Canada.

== Electoral history ==
=== 2019 general election ===
2019 Alberta general election: Red Deer-South
Party	Candidate	Votes	%	±%
United Conservative	Jason Stephan	16,159	60.31%	8.11%
New Democratic	Barb Miller	6,844	25.54%	-10.31%
Alberta Party	Ryan Mcdougall	3,244	12.11%	6.82%
Freedom Conservative	Teah-Jay Cartwright	299	1.12%	–
Green	Lori Curran	246	0.92%	-0.48%
Total		26,792	–	–
Rejected, spoiled and declined		161	58	12
Eligible electors / turnout		37,495	71.92%	19.90%
United Conservative gain from New Democratic		Swing		13.27%
Source(s) Source: "79 - Red Deer-South, 2019 Alberta general election". officialresults.elections.ab.ca. Elections Alberta.

=== 2015 general election ===
2015 Alberta general election: Red Deer-South
Party	Candidate	Votes	%	±%
New Democratic	Barb Miller	7,024	35.86%	25.30%
Progressive Conservative	Darcy Mykytyshyn	5,414	27.64%	-15.96%
Wildrose	Norman Wiebe	4,812	24.56%	-10.15%
Alberta Party	Serge Gingras	1,035	5.28%	1.55%
Liberal	Deborah Checkel	738	3.77%	-3.62%
Green	Ben Dubois	274	1.40%	–
Independent	Patti Argent	232	1.18%	–
Independent	William Berry	60	0.31%	–
Total		19,589	–	–
Rejected, spoiled and declined		49	43	9
Eligible electors / turnout		37,771	52.02%	2.32%
New Democratic gain from Progressive Conservative		Swing		-0.33%
Source(s) Source: "76 - Red Deer-South, 2015 Alberta general election". officialresults.elections.ab.ca. Elections Alberta.
