= Edmonton-Castle Downs =

Provincial electoral district in Alberta, Canada

Coordinates: 53.63°N 113.51°W

Alberta electoral district
- Edmonton-Castle Downs within the City of Edmonton, 2017 boundaries

Provincial electoral district
- Legislature: Legislative Assembly of Alberta
MLA
Nicole Goehring
New Democratic
- District created: 1996
- First contested: 1997
- Last contested: 2023

Edmonton-Castle Downs is a provincial electoral district in Alberta, Canada. The district is one of 87 mandated to return a single member to the Legislative Assembly of Alberta using the first past the post method of voting. The district was created in 1997 boundary redistribution when Edmonton-Roper merged with the north half of Edmonton-Mayfield. The riding has swung between Liberal and Progressive Conservative control since it was created, before returning an NDP MLA in 2015. The 2004 election was very controversial, with near even support for both the Liberal and Progressive Conservative candidates. The outcome was decided in the third recount, which resulted in Thomas Lukaszuk winning the riding by 3 votes.

Neighbourhoods in this riding include: Baturyn, Caernarvon, Carlisle, Beaumaris, Lorelei, Dunluce, Klarvatten, Rapperswill, Chambery, and Elsinore.

The riding was last contested in the 2019 election, during which the NDP incumbent, Nicole Goehring, defeated Ed Ammar of the United Conservative Party by 2,017 votes.

== History ==
The electoral district was created in the 1996 boundary redistribution from parts of Edmonton-Mayfield and Edmonton-Roper. The 2010 boundary redistribution saw some big changes to the riding with all land west of 127 street ceded to Edmonton-Calder and the eastern boundary that existed at 97 Street between the Edmonton city limits and 167 Avenue moved east to 82 Street in land that was part of Edmonton-Decore.

=== Boundary history ===
27 Edmonton-Calder 2003 boundaries
Bordering districts
| North | East | West | South |
|---|---|---|---|
| Athabasca-Redwater | St. Albert | Edmonton-Decore | Edmonton-Calder |
| riding map goes here | | | |
Legal description from the Statutes of Alberta 2003, Electoral Divisions Act.
Starting at the intersection of 142 Street with the north Edmonton city boundary; then 1. east along the north city boundary to 97 Street; 2. south along 97 Street to 153 Avenue; 3. west along 153 Avenue to 113A Street (Castle Downs Road); 4. south along 113A Street to 137 Avenue; 5. west along 137 Avenue to the north city boundary at 184 Street; 6. north, northeast and north along the west Edmonton city boundary to the starting point.
Note:

30 Edmonton-Castle Downs 2010 boundaries
Bordering districts
| North | East | West | South |
|---|---|---|---|
| Athabasca-Sturgeon-Redwater | Edmonton-Decore | Edmonton-Calder | Edmonton-Calder |
Legal description from the Statutes of Alberta 2010, Electoral Divisions Act.

=== Electoral history ===
Edmonton-Castle Downs
| Assembly | Years | Member | Party |
|---|---|---|---|
Riding created from Edmonton-Mayfield and Edmonton-Roper
| 24th | 1997–2001 | Pamela Paul-Zobaric | Liberal |
| 24th | 1999–2001 | Pamela Paul-Zobaric | Independent |
| 25th | 2001–2004 | Thomas Lukaszuk | Progressive Conservative |
| 26th | 2004–2008 | Thomas Lukaszuk | Progressive Conservative |
| 27th | 2008–2012 | Thomas Lukaszuk | Progressive Conservative |
| 28th | 2012–2015 | Thomas Lukaszuk | Progressive Conservative |
| 29th | 2015–2019 | Nicole Goehring | New Democratic |
| 30th | 2019–2023 | Nicole Goehring | New Democratic |
| 31st | 2023–Present | Nicole Goehring | New Democratic |

The electoral district was created in the 1997 boundary redistribution. The first election held in 1997 saw Liberal candidate Pamela Paul-Zobaric elected. She won a very closely contested race, defeating Progressive Conservative candidate Ihor Broda and two other candidates by just over 100 votes. She left the Liberal caucus over rights issues for women on November 15, 1999, to sit as an independent. She did not run again in the 2001 election.

The second representative of the district was Progressive Conservative Thomas Lukaszuk. He won a three-way race in the 2001 general election with just over half the popular vote to pick up the seat for his party. He ran for a second term in 2004. Lukaszuk appeared defeated on election night by a few votes over Liberal candidate Chris Kibermanis. A recount by Elections Alberta confirmed Kibbermanis as the winner and declared him as the elected member. Lukaszuk and his campaign team took the recount process to the courts, and won the election in the judicial recount.

Lukaszuk and Kibermanis both stood for election in 2008. Lukaszuk won with over half the popular vote, while Kibbermanis dropped to 36% of the total. Lukaszuk was re-elected in 2012; while his strict vote count only increased by around 700, his majority increased from 2,069 in 2008 to 4,697 in 2012.

In the 2015 Alberta General Election NDP MLA Nicole Goehring was elected with 64.5% of the vote, with Lukaszuk dropping to second with 23% of the popular vote.

== Legislative election results ==
=== 1997 ===
1997 Alberta general election
| Party | Candidate | Votes | % | ±% |
|---|---|---|---|---|
| Liberal | Pamela Paul | 4,456 | 41.32% | – |
| Progressive Conservative | Ihor Broda | 4,373 | 40.55% | – |
| New Democratic | Peter Johnsen | 1,494 | 13.86% | – |
| Social Credit | David H. Friesen | 460 | 4.27% | – |
| Total | | 10,783 | – | – |
| Rejected, spoiled and declined | | 32 | – | – |
| Eligible electors / turnout | | 21,400 | 50.54% | – |
| Liberal pickup new district. | | | | |
Source(s) Source: "Edmonton-Castle Downs Official Results 1997 Alberta general election". Alberta Heritage Community Foundation.

=== 2001 ===
2001 Alberta general election
| Party | Candidate | Votes | % | ±% |
|---|---|---|---|---|
| Progressive Conservative | Thomas A. Lukaszuk | 5,971 | 51.10% | 10.55% |
| Liberal | Boris Yaremko | 4,479 | 38.33% | -2.99% |
| New Democratic | Michael Charrois | 1,235 | 10.57% | -3.29% |
| Total | | 11,685 | – | – |
| Rejected, spoiled and declined | | 34 | – | – |
| Eligible electors / turnout | | 24,921 | 46.95% | -3.59% |
| Progressive Conservative gain from Liberal | | Swing | | 6.00% |
Source(s) Source: "Edmonton-Castle Downs Official Results 2001 Alberta general election". Alberta Heritage Community Foundation.

=== 2004 judicial recount ===
The 2004 election saw a field of five candidates. Incumbent Thomas Lukaszuk was running for his second term in office after winning a close race in 2001. Chris Kibermannis was chosen as the Liberal candidate. He was a former draft pick for the Winnipeg Jets and a welder by trade. The NDP chose Peter Cross, who is a small business owner working as a graphics artist and long time Edmonton resident.

| 2004 Alberta general election unofficial results | | Turnout 41.42% | |
| Affiliation | Candidate | Votes | % |
| Liberal | Chris Kibermanis | 5,019 | 41.79% |
| Progressive Conservative | Thomas Lukaszuk | 5,014 | 41.75% |
| NDP | Peter Cross | 1,317 | 10.97% |
| Alberta Alliance | Colin Presizniuk | 583 | 4.85% |
| Social Credit | Ross Korpi | 78 | 0.64% |
| Total | | 12,011 | 100% |
| Rejected, spoiled and declined | | 96 | |

Rounding out the field of candidates, the Alberta Alliance running their first campaign acclaimed candidate Colin Presizniuk and Social Credit run candidate Ross Korpi. Presizniuk is a high-profile Edmonton area accountant and consultant who runs Presizniuk and Associates.

The 2004 election proved to very contentious. On election night returns for the district had Liberal candidate Chris Kibermanis winning an incredibly tight race by three votes over Progressive Conservative incumbent Thomas Lukaszuk. The race split the riding's 79 precincts with Kibermanis winning 43 to Lukaszuk's 36. The poll by poll numbers show the race was evenly divided across the board as no candidate was particularly strong in a geographic area. The other three candidates were only a marginal factor with the race polarizing between the Progressive Conservatives and the Liberals. NDP candidate Peter Cross made a respectable but distant third place showing. He gained votes for his party winning a slightly higher plurality, but decreasing in percentage of popular vote over the 2001 results.

At the bottom of the field, the Alberta Alliance candidate Colin Presizniuk took about 5% of the popular vote. His results were consistent with the party's showing in other Edmonton districts. The Social Credit party running their first candidate in the riding since 1997, saw a significant decrease in support as Ross Korpi barely registered with voters.

The razor thin election night margin separating the two candidates kept the results in doubt. The automatic recount process completed a few days later by returning officer Elizabeth Burk, narrowed the margin even further as Lukaszuk would gain two votes. In addition to the results, voter turnout in the riding dropped to a record low almost reaching 42%. The turn out was significantly down falling five points from the 2001 election, and almost nine percentage points from the election in 1997.

| Alberta Court of Appeal judicial recount | | Turnout 41.42% | | Swing | |
| Affiliation | Candidate | Votes | % | Party | Personal |
| Progressive Conservative | Thomas Lukaszuk | 5,022 | 41.78% | -9.32% | |
| Liberal | Chris Kibermanis | 5,019 | 41.76% | 3.43% | * |
| New Democratic | Peter Cross | 1,314 | 10.93% | 0.36% | |
| Alberta Alliance | Colin Presizniuk | 586 | 4.88% | | |
| Social Credit | Ross Korpi | 78 | 0.58% | | |
| Total | | 12,019 | | | |
| Rejected, spoiled, and declined | | 86 | | | |
| Eligible electors / Turnout | | 29,226 | % | | |
| Progressive Conservative hold | | Swing | | -6.38% | |

After the Official results were announced by Elections Alberta, the legislative standings on the Alberta Legislature website had been updated to reflect Kibermanis winning as a member-elect. The Progressive Conservatives immediately challenged the results in the Court of Queen's Bench. The first judge at the Court of Queen's Bench upheld the returning officers verdict of a three-vote margin. A second count was done and the results were verified the same as the first. The Progressive Conservatives appealed the results to the Court of Appeal of Alberta.

The Alberta Court of Appeals disputed a number of previously rejected ballots increasing the margin of Thomas Lukaszuk from 5,016 votes to 5,022 votes. The court also added some votes for Presizniuk and took some away for Cross, Korpi and Kibermanis did not see any change in their totals. As a result of the judicial ruling, the previous judicial counts and the Elections Alberta official count were over turned. Kibermanis did not have the resources to appeal the third judicial decision and conceded defeat. Thomas Lukaszuk was declared re-elected and returned to office. After the results were made official, the Liberals announced that Kibermanis would be the candidate for the next general election and would continue campaigning in the riding until the next writ period.

As a direct result of this election, both the campaigns for Thomas Lukaszuk and Chris Kibermanis filed an application to the Court of Appeal to reimburse the legal costs of contesting the results. No provisions existed under the Election Act and the appeals were denied. In October 2005 the Standing Legislative Offices Committee reviewed the matter and changes were recommended to allow candidates to be reimbursed for their legal costs.

=== 2008 ===
2008 Alberta general election
| Party | Candidate | Votes | % | ±% |
|---|---|---|---|---|
| Progressive Conservative | Thomas A. Lukaszuk | 7,159 | 51.55% | 9.77% |
| Liberal | Christopher John Kibermanis | 5,090 | 36.65% | -5.11% |
| New Democratic | Ali Haymour | 1,341 | 9.66% | -1.28% |
| Green | Bob Reckhow | 297 | 2.14% | – |
| Total | | 13,887 | – | – |
| Rejected, spoiled and declined | | 57 | – | – |
| Eligible electors / turnout | | 34,570 | 40.31% | -0.99% |
| Progressive Conservative hold | | Swing | | 7.44% |
Source(s) Source: "27 - Edmonton-Castle Downs, 2008 Alberta general election". officialresults.elections.ab.ca. Elections Alberta.

=== 2012 ===
2012 Alberta general election
| Party | Candidate | Votes | % | ±% |
|---|---|---|---|---|
| Progressive Conservative | Thomas A. Lukaszuk | 8,054 | 52.60% | 1.05% |
| Wildrose | John Oplanich | 3,295 | 21.52% | – |
| New Democratic | Brian Labelle | 1,934 | 12.63% | 2.97% |
| Liberal | Kim Cassady | 1,768 | 11.55% | -25.11% |
| Alberta Party | Jeff Funnell | 260 | 1.70% | – |
| Total | | 15,311 | – | – |
| Rejected, spoiled and declined | | 62 | – | – |
| Eligible electors / turnout | | 30,804 | 49.91% | 9.59% |
| Progressive Conservative hold | | Swing | | 8.09% |
Source(s) Source: "30 - Edmonton-Castle Downs, 2012 Alberta general election". officialresults.elections.ab.ca. Elections Alberta.

=== 2015 ===
2015 Alberta general election
| Party | Candidate | Votes | % | ±% |
|---|---|---|---|---|
| New Democratic | Nicole Goehring | 11,689 | 64.46% | 51.83% |
| Progressive Conservative | Thomas Lukaszuk | 4,182 | 23.06% | -29.54% |
| Wildrose | Gerrit Roosenboom | 1,383 | 7.63% | -13.89% |
| Liberal | Todd Ross | 880 | 4.85% | -6.69% |
| Total | | 18,134 | – | – |
| Rejected, spoiled and declined | | 69 | – | – |
| Eligible electors / turnout | | 35,641 | 51.07% | 1.17% |
| New Democratic gain from Progressive Conservative | | Swing | | 5.16% |
Source(s) Source: "30 - Edmonton-Castle Downs, 2015 Alberta general election". officialresults.elections.ab.ca. Elections Alberta.

=== 2019 ===
2019 Alberta general election
| Party | Candidate | Votes | % | ±% |
|---|---|---|---|---|
| New Democratic | Nicole Goehring | 9,445 | 45.69% | -18.77% |
| United Conservative | Ed Ammar | 7,428 | 35.93% | 5.24% |
| Alberta Party | Moe Rahall | 3,213 | 15.54% | – |
| Alberta Independence | Todd Wayne | 294 | 1.42% | – |
| Liberal | Thomas Deak | 291 | 1.41% | -3.44% |
| Total | | 20,671 | – | – |
| Rejected, spoiled and declined | | 107 | 60 | 14 |
| Eligible electors / turnout | | 31,953 | 65.26% | 14.19% |
| New Democratic hold | | Swing | | -15.82% |
Source(s) Source: "28 - Edmonton-Castle Downs, 2019 Alberta general election". officialresults.elections.ab.ca. Elections Alberta. Alberta. Chief Electoral Officer (2019). 2019 General Election. A Report of the Chief Electoral Officer. Volume II (PDF) (Report). Vol. 2. Edmonton, Alta.: Elections Alberta. pp. 108–111. ISBN 978-1-988620-12-1.

=== 2023 ===
2023 Alberta general election
| Party | Candidate | Votes | % | ±% |
|---|---|---|---|---|
| New Democratic | Nicole Goehring | 10,044 | 55.69 | +9.99 |
| United Conservative | Jon Dziadyk | 7,286 | 40.39 | +4.46 |
| Alberta Party | Patrick Stewart | 707 | 3.92 | -11.62 |
| Total | | 18,037 | 99.26 | – |
| Rejected and declined | | 135 | 0.74 | |
| Turnout | | 18,172 | 53.57 | |
| Eligible voters | | 33,921 | | |
| New Democratic hold | | Swing | | +2.77 |
Source(s) Source: Elections Alberta

== Senate nominee election results ==
=== 2004 ===
| 2004 Senate nominee election results: Edmonton-Castle Downs | | | | Turnout 41.69% | |
| Affiliation | Candidate | Votes | % votes | % ballots | Rank |
| Progressive Conservative | Betty Unger | 4,737 | 15.95% | 49.04% | 2 |
| Independent | Link Byfield | 3,362 | 11.32% | 34.80% | 4 |
| Progressive Conservative | Bert Brown | 3,328 | 11.21% | 34.45% | 1 |
| Progressive Conservative | Cliff Breitkreuz | 3,184 | 10.72% | 32.96% | 3 |
| Alberta Alliance | Michael Roth | 2,812 | 9.47% | 29.11% | 7 |
| Independent | Tom Sindlinger | 2,735 | 9.21% | 28.31% | 9 |
| Alberta Alliance | Gary Horan | 2,488 | 8.38% | 25.76% | 10 |
| Alberta Alliance | Vance Gough | 2,472 | 8.33% | 25.59% | 8 |
| Progressive Conservative | David Usherwood | 2,447 | 8.24% | 25.33% | 6 |
| Progressive Conservative | Jim Silye | 2,129 | 7.17% | 22.04% | 5 |
| Total votes | | 29,694 | 100% | | |
| Total ballots | | 9,660 | 3.07 votes per ballot | | |
| Rejected, spoiled and declined | | 2,523 | | | |

Voters had the option of selecting four candidates on the ballot

== Student vote results ==
=== 2004 ===
Participating schools
Caernarvon School

On November 19, 2004, a student vote was conducted at participating Alberta schools to parallel the 2004 Alberta general election results. The vote was designed to educate students and simulate the electoral process for persons who have not yet reached the legal majority. The vote was conducted in 80 of the 83 provincial electoral districts with students voting for actual election candidates. Schools with a large student body that reside in another electoral district had the option to vote for candidates outside of the electoral district then where they were physically located.

2004 Alberta student vote results
| Affiliation | Candidate | Votes | % |
| Liberal | Chris Kibermanis | 46 | 40.35% |
| Progressive Conservative | Thomas Lukaszuk | 30 | 26.32% |
| Alberta Alliance | Colin Presizniuk | 17 | 14.91% |
| NDP | Peter Cross | 14 | 12.28% |
| Social Credit | Ross Korpi | 7 | 6.14% |
| Total | | 114 | 100% |
| Rejected, spoiled and declined | | 11 | |

=== 2012 ===
2012 Alberta student vote results
| Affiliation | Candidate | Votes | % |
| Progressive Conservative | Thomas Lukaszuk | | % |
| Wildrose | John Oplanich | | |
| Liberal | Kim Cassady | | % |
| Alberta Party | Jeff Funnell | | |
| NDP | Brian Labelle | | % |
| Total | | | 100% |

== See also ==
- List of Alberta provincial electoral districts
- Canadian provincial electoral districts
