= Thomas Lukaszuk =

Canadian politician

The Honourable Thomas Lukaszuk
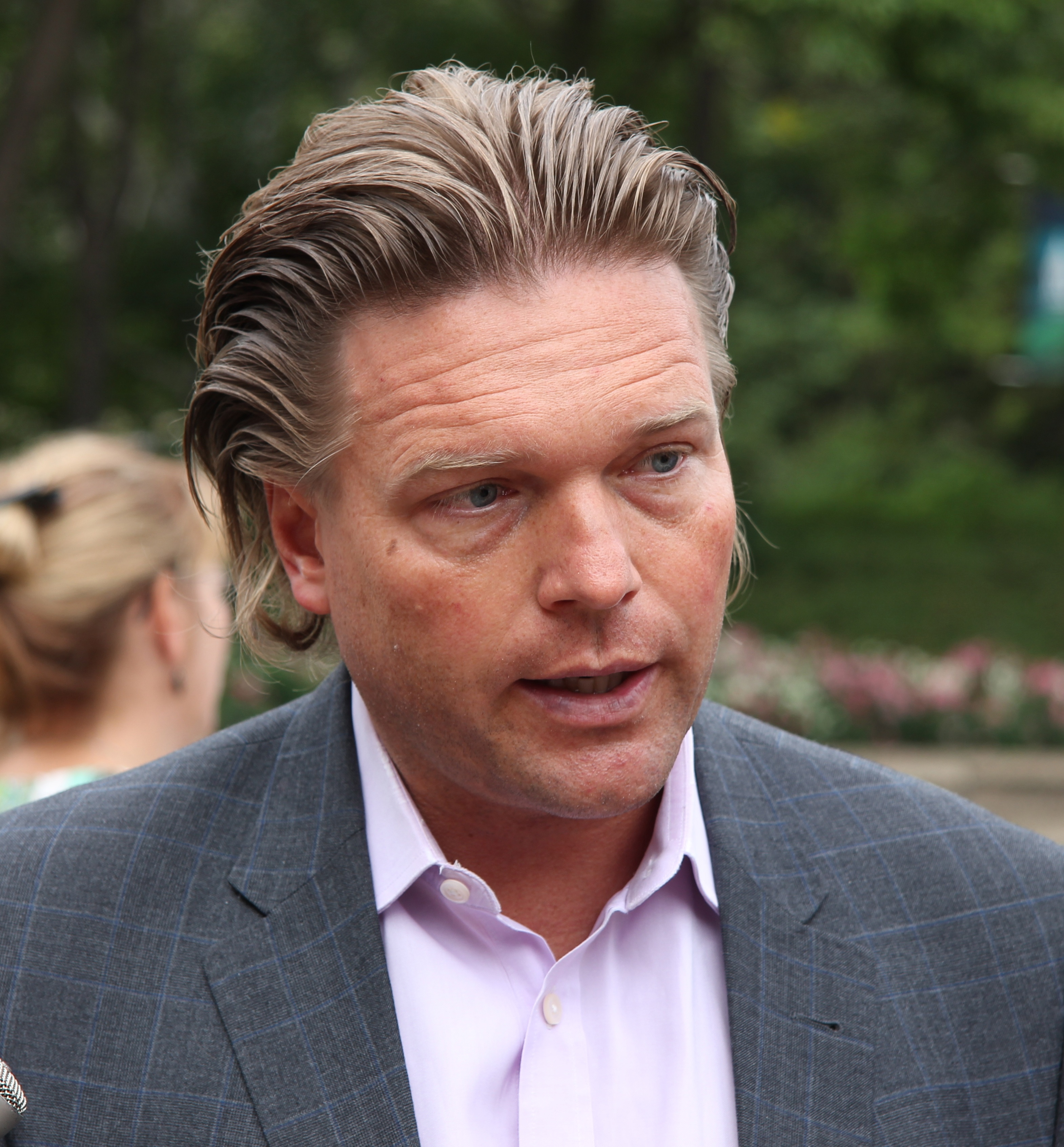
- Lukaszuk in 2012

8th Deputy Premier of Alberta
- In office May 8, 2012 – December 13, 2013
- Preceded by: Doug Horner
- Succeeded by: Dave Hancock

Member of the Legislative Assembly of Alberta for Edmonton-Castle Downs
- In office March 12, 2001 – May 5, 2015
- Preceded by: Pamela Paul
- Succeeded by: Nicole Goehring

Personal details
- Born: Tomasz Adam Łukaszuk; April 5, 1969 (age 57)
- Party: Independent (2017–present)
- Other political affiliations: Progressive Conservative (1986–2017)
- Spouse: Stacey Brotzel
- Education: University of Alberta
- Occupation: Politician, businessman

Thomas Adam Lukaszuk ECA (born April 5, 1969) is a Polish-born Canadian politician and former Member of the Legislative Assembly of Alberta. He represented the constituency of Edmonton-Castle Downs from 2001 to 2015 as a Progressive Conservative. He served in the provincial cabinet from 2010 to 2014, and was the 8th Deputy Premier from 2012 to 2013. He was the first Polish-born cabinet minister and deputy premier in Canada.

== Background ==
Lukaszuk served on the Social Care Facilities Review Committee, which gathers Albertans' feedback on the quality of services being provided, and provides recommendations to the Government on how to proceed in that area. He also chaired the Citizens' Appeal Panel, which led to government policy changes surrounding social benefits, and he served on the Alberta Lotteries Review Committee. He conducted a review of Alberta daycares, foster homes, group homes and homeless shelters for the Minister of Children's Services before being elected as an MLA.

== Political career ==
=== Backbench career 2001–2008 ===
In 2001, Edmonton-Castle Downs MLA Pamela Paul's retirement opened the door for Lukaszuk to stand for election. Garnering 5,971 votes in the 2001 provincial election, he was able to increase the Progressive Conservative vote share to 51 per cent, up from the 40 per cent Ihor Broda polled in losing to Paul in 1997. Upon his election, he became the first ever Polish-born person to be elected to a Canadian legislature.

In his first term in office, Lukaszuk sponsored Bill 204, a private member's bill known as the Blood Samples Act, which passed third reading on March 31, 2004 and was passed into law on May 11, 2004. The act granted authority to Good Samaritans, front-line emergency workers, police officers, fire fighters, correctional officers, and health service providers to seek an order from the justice system to take a blood sample from a person who has refused to give their consent. The act protected individuals who believed they had come into contact with the body fluid of a person who is infected with a virus that causes a prescribed communicable disease.

=== 2004 election ===
On the night of the 2004 provincial election, Lukaszuk was declared defeated by the Liberal Party candidate Chris Kibermanis, a former draft pick of the NHL's Winnipeg Jets. Unofficial results showed Kibermanis winning by a five-vote margin over Lukaszuk. An automatic judicial recount confirmed Kibermanis's win by three votes rather than five, and Kibermanis was declared the winner by Elections Alberta. However, Lukaszuk appealed the recount three times, to the Alberta Court of Appeals, disputing a number of rejected ballots. The third presiding judge gave Lukaszuk a three-vote margin of victory. The ordeal earned Lukaszuk the moniker "Landslide Lukaszuk," which has been ascribed to him in the local media. Kibermanis again challenged Lukaszuk in the 2008 provincial election, but was defeated by 2,080 votes.

=== Stelmach cabinet appointment 2010 ===
On January 13, 2010, Lukaszuk was appointed as Minister of Employment and Immigration in the government of Ed Stelmach. He introduced a number of reforms to occupational health and safety programs. The changes included releasing information about employers’ safety records online, introducing “blitz” inspections, and hiring additional health and safety officers.

=== Redford cabinet 2011–2014 ===
On October 12, 2011, he was sworn in as Minister of Education under Alison Redford. That same day, government provided $107 million in funding to school boards to deal with growth pressures. Over his term, Lukaszuk would change the provisions for public education in Morinville to make it the same as elsewhere in the province, and reduce the administrative burden for charter schools.

Redford appointed him Deputy Premier on May 8, 2012, and in July named him as Ministerial Liaison to the Canadian Forces. On February 4, 2013 he was appointed as Minister of Enterprise and Advanced Education. In July 2013, he was named one of the 50 most influential Albertans for having “proven himself to be one of the most capable and influential members” of the government.

Lukaszuk resigned from cabinet on May 22, 2014 in order to stand in the Alberta Progressive Conservative Association's leadership election after Redford was forced to resign from the premiership due to a scandal concerning her expenses. During the campaign scandals arose regarding roaming charges of more than $20,000 charged to taxpayers during a personal vacation and revelations concerning the presence of his daughter on government flights. He placed third with 11.4% support in the vote that elected Jim Prentice party leader.

==== Controversies ====
Lukaszuk was found to be using his government cell phone on a personal trip to Israel and Poland in 2012. The leaked government report showed that he accumulated over $20,000 in roaming charges at the expense of Alberta taxpayers during this personal trip. Although the trip was personal Lukaszuk was continuing to work at the time and the charges were a result of his need to stay in contact in his capacity as Deputy Premier. The use of the phone was cleared by the Auditor General, as the charges were directly related to Lukaszuk's government duties.

In spring 2013 the Progressive Conservatives tabled their first Alberta budget since reelection. The government failed to honour its 2012 provincial election promises to continue to increase post-secondary education at a rate of 2%. Instead the budget was cut by 7.2%, a 9.2% shortfall. Lukaszuk, as the newly appointed Deputy Premier and Minister of Enterprise and Advanced Education, presided over these controversial cuts and layoffs at Alberta's colleges and universities. Post-secondary institutions were given a letter of expectation with regards to spending priorities, which was released publicly by University of Alberta. The ongoing controversy surrounding the branding of "Campus Alberta" in this letter has been closely covered by media outlets. Lukaszuk has also made it clear that post-secondary institutions should not make up shortfalls with tuition increases or otherwise additional fees. However, actual students costs have been impacted. At University of Alberta alone, $500,000 in scholarships to attract top students were cut to make up this loss. Graduate funding has also been reduced and in many cases removed. Administrator salaries were not cut due to a collective bargaining agreement. Lukaszuk confirmed that the government would send in a special team of independent financial consultants to review university books and to find faster budget cuts. These consultants never showed up.

On October 9, 2013, following 900 academic staff and faculty job losses across the province, Lukazuk announced $142.5 million had come available to construct a new Engineering building at University of Calgary. This figure was a controversial amount, close to the $147 million needed to reverse cuts eight months before. The decision was also at odds with Lukaszuk's written assurances to university administrators on July 3, 2013 that he would advocate to reverse the budget cuts if additional money became available: "Look guys, you're not happy, I'm not happy with this budget. But this is the reality.... The moment I have any extra dollars I can access, I'll be the first on my knees before the treasury board advocating for you to get your dollars. But in the meantime, get your financial houses in order," he said. $50 million in additional operating funds was provided in November 2013, eight months after the budget was tabled. The delay caused permanent layoffs and closures of programs across the province. Lukaszuk has since been reassigned to a different government file.

== Post-political life ==
In 2023, Lukaszuk saved a man from committing suicide. On August 10, 2023, he claimed he was the victim of spying by the Polish government. The alleged spying was confirmed by Polish diplomat, Consul General Andrzej Mańkowski, who alleges he was dismissed from his position when he refused the Polish government's orders to collect information about Lukaszuk.

=== Alberta Forever Canada petition ===
In 2025, he spearheaded a Alberta Forever Canada citizen initiative in opposition to Alberta separating from Canada. On June 30, Elections Alberta approved Lukaszuk's application for Alberta Forever Canada and issued the petition which meant that signature collection could begin. The petition was launched on August 2 in Edmonton. The goal is to collect 293,976 signatures representing 10% of Alberta's electorate by October 28 which would force a referendum. The official campaign website for Forever Canadian includes regular updates on public locations for in-person voting. The CIP question is: Do you agree that Alberta should remain in Canada?

The application submitted on June 5 said that the petition was motivated by discussions and a potential imminent referendum about Alberta's separation from Canada. The application said that Alberta's independence would threaten both the Albertan and Canadian economy, the wealth of individuals, rights enjoyed by Alberta residents as part of Canadian citizenship, First Nations' treaty rights, and other negative consequences. The application also cited that only a minority of Albertans belonged to the special interest group that called for Alberta separation. Lukaszuk explained that his intention was to get a vote in legislature that Alberta agree it should stay within Canada. On October 28, Lukaszuk announced that the Forever Canadian petition had more than 456,000 signatures, far above the needed 294,000. After it got verified by Elections Alberta, the government referred it to a legislative committee to discuss it. On February 21, 2026, Premier Danielle Smith announced that she form bipartisan committee to discuss the petition.

== Humanitarian work ==
In 2011, Lukaszuk initiated a charity called the Castle Downs Recreation Society International that refurbishes, ships and installs children’s playgrounds in developing countries throughout the world. To date, his organization has constructed playgrounds in Philippines (2011), Vietnam (2013), Nicaragua (2016) and Cambodia (2018).

In 2022, Thomas Lukaszuk and former Alberta premier Ed Stelmach organized Canada's largest foreign aid shipment in an initiative to collect supplies and ship them to Ukraine's war front to aid soldiers. The donation drive they led raised $35 million worth of life-saving supplies, which they successfully arranged to be airlifted to Poland while also bringing 67 Ukrainian refugees from Poland to Edmonton. The Boeing 787 Dreamliner flight arrived in Edmonton with the refugees, was loaded with donations and then returned to Poland, where the lifesaving medications, equipment and supplies were shipped by ground transport to Ukraine. Sixteen sea containers filled with donations were also shipped. As a consequence of this work, on November 14, 2022 the Ministry of Foreign Affairs of the Russian Federation banned Lukaszuk from entering the Russian Federation.

In 2023, Lukaszuk organized a humanitarian shipment of three containers filled with life-saving medical aid, baby supplies and food for the children of Gaza.

== Honours and decorations ==
Lukaszuk has been recognized for his extensive humanitarian efforts with the following awards.

| Medals and Decorations | Year Bestowed |
|---|---|
| Alberta Centennial Medal | 2005 |
| Queen’s Golden Jubilee Medal | 2002 |
| Queen’s Diamond Jubilee Medal | 2012 |
| Queen’s Platinum Jubilee Medal | 2022 |
| Honorary Testimonial for Bravery & Lifesaving - Royal Canadian Humane Association | |
| The Priory of Canada of the Most Venerable Order of the Hospital of St. John of Jerusalem - Life Saving Award | 2009, 2015 |
| Republic of Poland Retired Air Force Pilots’ Association - XX Jubilee Medal of Recognition | 1994 |
| Ukraine Crisis Humanitarian Aid Award | 2023 |

== Personal life ==
Lukaszuk has two daughters, one with his current wife, 880 CHED host Stacey Brotzel and one with his previous wife.

== Election results ==
=== 2015 general election ===
2015 Alberta general election: Edmonton-Castle Downs
| Party | Candidate | Votes | % | ±% |
|---|---|---|---|---|
| New Democratic | Nicole Goehring | 11,689 | 64.46% | 51.83% |
| Progressive Conservative | Thomas Lukaszuk | 4,182 | 23.06% | -29.54% |
| Wildrose | Gerrit Roosenboom | 1,383 | 7.63% | -13.89% |
| Liberal | Todd Ross | 880 | 4.85% | -6.69% |
| Total | | 18,134 | – | – |
| Rejected, spoiled and declined | | 69 | – | – |
| Eligible electors / turnout | | 35,641 | 51.07% | 1.17% |
| New Democratic gain from Progressive Conservative | | Swing | | 5.16% |
Source(s) Source: "30 - Edmonton-Castle Downs, 2015 Alberta general election". officialresults.elections.ab.ca. Elections Alberta.

=== 2012 general election ===
2012 Alberta general election: Edmonton-Castle Downs
| Party | Candidate | Votes | % | ±% |
|---|---|---|---|---|
| Progressive Conservative | Thomas A. Lukaszuk | 8,054 | 52.60% | 1.05% |
| Wildrose | John Oplanich | 3,295 | 21.52% | – |
| New Democratic | Brian Labelle | 1,934 | 12.63% | 2.97% |
| Liberal | Kim Cassady | 1,768 | 11.55% | -25.11% |
| Alberta Party | Jeff Funnell | 260 | 1.70% | – |
| Total | | 15,311 | – | – |
| Rejected, spoiled and declined | | 62 | – | – |
| Eligible electors / turnout | | 30,804 | 49.91% | 9.59% |
| Progressive Conservative hold | | Swing | | 8.09% |
Source(s) Source: "30 - Edmonton-Castle Downs, 2012 Alberta general election". officialresults.elections.ab.ca. Elections Alberta.

=== 2008 general election ===
| 2008 Alberta general election results ( Edmonton-Castle Downs ) | | Turnout 40.3% | |
| Affiliation | Candidate | Votes | % |
| Progressive Conservative | Thomas Lukaszuk | 7,159 | 51.6% |
| Liberal | Chris Kibermanis | 5,090 | 36.7% |
| Green | Bob Reckhow | 297 | 2.1% |
| New Democratic | Ali Haymour | 1,341 | 9.7% |

=== 2004 general election ===
| 2004 Alberta general election results ( Edmonton-Castle Downs ) | | Turnout 41.3% | |
| Affiliation | Candidate | Votes | % |
| Progressive Conservative | Thomas Lukaszuk | 5,022 | 41.8% |
| Liberal | Chris Kibermanis | 5,019 | 41.8% |
| Alberta Alliance | Colin Presizniuk | 586 | 4.9% |
| New Democratic | Peter Cross | 1,314 | 10.9% |
| Social Credit | Ross Korpi | 78 | 0.6% |

=== 2001 general election ===
| 2001 Alberta general election results ( Edmonton-Castle Downs ) | | Turnout 46.9% | |
| Affiliation | Candidate | Votes | % |
| Progressive Conservative | Thomas Lukaszuk | 5,971 | 51.1% |
| Liberal | Boris Yaremko | 4,479 | 38.3% |
| New Democratic | Michael Charrois | 1,235 | 10.6% |
