= Livingstone-Macleod =

Provincial electoral district in Alberta, Canada

Coordinates: 49.7°N 113.6°W

Alberta electoral district
- Livingstone-Macleod within Alberta, 2017 boundaries

Provincial electoral district
- Legislature: Legislative Assembly of Alberta
MLA
Chelsae Petrovic
United Conservative
- District created: 1996
- First contested: 1997
- Last contested: 2023

Livingstone-Macleod is a provincial electoral district in Alberta, Canada. The district is one of 87 current districts in the province mandated to return a single member to the Legislative Assembly of Alberta using the first past the post method of voting.

The electoral district located in rural southwestern Alberta was created with minimal boundary changes in the 1997 boundary re-distribution from the old riding of Pincher Creek-Macleod. The district is named after Mount Livingstone and the town of Fort Macleod. The district also contains the communities of Pincher Creek and the municipality of the Crowsnest Pass.

The district and its antecedent have been favourable to electing Progressive Conservative candidates in the past few decades, but this history was broken in the 2012 Alberta general election when Wildrose candidate Pat Stier was elected.

== History ==
The electoral district was created in the 1996 boundary redistribution primarily from the old electoral district of Pincher Creek-Macleod.

Significant changes were made to the district in the 2010 boundary redistribution. The Blood Reserve was transferred to the electoral district of Cardston-Taber-Warner while land south of the town of High River that was in Highwood as well as a portion of land in that constituency in the north west and the portion of land that was part of the abolished Foothills-Rocky View electoral district south of Tsuu T'ina Nation was transferred into the electoral district.

=== Boundary history ===
67 Livingstone-Macleod 2003 boundaries
Bordering districts
North	East	West	South
Banff-Cochrane and Highwood	Lethbridge-West and Little Bow	none	Cardston-Taber-Warner
riding map goes here			
Legal description from the Statutes of Alberta 2003, Electoral Divisions Act.
Starting at the intersection of the Alberta-British Columbia boundary and the north boundary of Twp. 13; then 1. east along the north boundary of Twp. 13 to the east boundary of Rge. 6 W5; 2. north along the east boundary of Rge. 6 W5 to the south boundary of the Cataract Creek Snow Vehicle Forest Land Use Zone described in Order In Council 998/79; 3. northeasterly along the south boundary to the north boundary of Sec. 14 in Twp. 15, Rge. 3 W5; 4. west along the north boundary to the east boundary of Sec. 22 in the Twp.; 5. north along the east boundary of Secs. 22 and 27 to the north boundary of Sec. 27; 6. west along the north boundary of Sec. 27 to the east boundary of Sec. 33; 7. north along the east boundary to the north boundary of Twp. 15, Rge. 3 W5; 8. east along the Twp. to the east boundary of Sec. 4, Twp. 16, Rge. 2 W5; 9. north along the east boundary of Secs. 4, 9, 16, 21, 28 and 33 to the north boundary of Twp. 16, Rge. 2 W5; 10. east along the north boundary of Twp. 16 to the east boundary of Sec. 6, Twp. 17, Rge. 28 W4; 11. north along the east boundary to the north boundary of Sec. 5; 12. east along the north boundary of Secs. 5, 4, 3, 2 and 1 in Twp. 17, Rge. 28 W4 and east along the north boundary of Secs. 6, 5, 4, 3, 2 and 1 in Twp. 17, Rge. 27 W4; 13. east along the north boundary of Sec. 6 in Twp. 17, Rge. 26 W4 to the right bank of the Little Bow River; 14. downstream along the right bank to the east boundary of Rge. 25 W4; 15. south along the east boundary to the north boundary of the south half of Sec. 18 in Twp. 11, Rge. 24 W4; 16. east along the north boundary of the south half of Secs. 18 and 17 to the east boundary of Sec. 17 in the Twp.; 17. south along the east boundary of Secs. 17, 8 and 5 in the Twp. to the north boundary of Twp. 10; 18. east along the north boundary to the east boundary of Sec. 31 in Twp. 10, Rge. 24; W4; 19. south along the east boundary of Sec. 31 and 30 in the Twp. to the right bank of the Oldman River; 20. downstream along the Oldman River to the north boundary of the Blood Indian Reserve No. 148; 21. generally southeast, southwest, west and northeast along the boundary of the Blood Indian Reserve No. 148 to its intersection with the right bank of the Waterton River; 22. upstream along the right bank to the north boundary of Waterton Lakes National Park; 23. in a generally westerly direction along the north park boundary to the Alberta-British Columbia boundary; 24. in a generally northerly direction along the boundary to the starting point.
Note:

71 Livingstone-Macleod 2010 boundaries
Bordering districts
North	East	West	South
Banff-Cochrane, Calgary-Lougheed, Chestermere-Rocky View and Highwood	Little Bow	British Columbia boundary	Cardston-Taber-Warner
Legal description from the Statutes of Alberta 2010, Electoral Divisions Act.

=== Electoral history ===
Members of the Legislative Assembly for Livingstone-Macleod
Assembly	Years	Member	Party
Riding created from Pincher Creek-Macleod and Cardston-Chief Mountain
24th	1997–2001	David Coutts	Progressive Conservative
25th	2001–2004	David Coutts	Progressive Conservative
26th	2004–2008	David Coutts	Progressive Conservative
27th	2008–2012	Evan Berger	Progressive Conservative
28th	2012–2015	Pat Stier	Wildrose
29th	2015–2017	Pat Stier	Wildrose
29th	2017–2019	Pat Stier	United Conservative
30th	2019–2023	Roger Reid	United Conservative
31st	2023–present	Chelsae Petrovic	United Conservative

The electoral district was created in the 1997 boundary redistribution. The election held that year saw Pincher Creek-Macleod Progressive Conservative incumbent David Coutts win more than half the popular vote over Liberal candidate Ernie Patterson to pick up the seat for his party.

The two would face each other again in the 2001 general election. Coutts would be re-elected with a larger majority to win his third term in office. Coutts won his fourth term in the 2004 election taking just over half of the popular vote in the riding. He retired from office at dissolution of the assembly in 2008.

The second representative of the district was Progressive Conservative MLA Evan Berger; elected to his first term in the 2008 general election.

== Legislative election results ==
=== 2023 ===
2023 Alberta general election
Party	Candidate	Votes	%	±%
United Conservative	Chelsae Petrovic	16,491	66.94	-3.70
New Democratic	Kevin Van Tighem	6,492	26.35	+5.83
Alberta Party	Kevin Todd	975	3.96	-1.15
Alberta Independence	Corrie Reed Toone	353	1.43	-0.29
Liberal	Dylin Hauser	194	0.79	-0.25
Independent	Erik Abildgaard	130	0.53	–
Total		24,635	99.51	–
Rejected and declined		122	0.49	
Turnout		24,757	64.47	
Eligible voters		38,398		
United Conservative hold		Swing		-4.77
Source(s) Source: Elections Alberta

=== 2019 ===
2019 Alberta general election
Party	Candidate	Votes	%	±%
United Conservative	Roger Reid	17,644	70.64	-2.97
New Democratic	Cam Gardner	5,125	20.52	-0.93
Alberta Party	Tim Meech	1,276	5.11	+3.18
Alberta Independence	Vern Sparkes	430	1.72	–
Liberal	Dylin Hauser	258	1.03	-0.79
Green	Wendy Pergentile	244	0.98	+0.24
Total		24,977	99.22	–
Rejected, spoiled and declined		197	0.78	
Turnout		25,174	69.59	
Eligible voters		36,173		
United Conservative notional hold		Swing		-1.02
Source(s) Source: "73 - Livingstone-Macleod, 2019 Alberta general election". officialresults.elections.ab.ca. Elections Alberta.

=== 2015 ===
2015 Alberta general election
Party	Candidate	Votes	%	±%
Wildrose	Pat Stier	7,362	39.89%	-8.17%
Progressive Conservative	Evan P. Berger	6,404	34.69%	-6.68%
New Democratic	Aileen Burke	4,228	22.91%	17.62%
Liberal	Alida Hess	464	2.51%	-0.83%
Total		18,458	–	–
Rejected, spoiled and declined		55	14	29
Eligible electors / turnout		32,991	56.16%	-4.31%
Wildrose hold		Swing		-0.74%
Source(s) Source: "71 - Livingstone-Macleod, 2015 Alberta general election". officialresults.elections.ab.ca. Elections Alberta.

2015 Alberta general election redistributed results
Party	Votes	%
Wildrose	7,775	40.37
Progressive Conservative	6,402	33.24
New Democratic	4,130	21.44
Alberta Party	372	1.93
Liberal	351	1.82
Green	142	0.74
Social Credit	87	0.45
Source(s) Source: Ridingbuilder

=== 2012 ===
2012 Alberta general election
Party	Candidate	Votes	%	±%
Wildrose	Pat Stier	8,577	48.05%	37.55%
Progressive Conservative	Evan P. Berger	7,385	41.37%	-22.81%
New Democratic	Matthew Halton	944	5.29%	0.23%
Liberal	Alex MacDonald	597	3.34%	-12.96%
Evergreen	Larry Ashmore	346	1.94%	–
Total		17,849	–	–
Rejected, spoiled and declined		66	9	44
Eligible electors / turnout		29,644	60.46%	22.12%
Wildrose gain from Progressive Conservative		Swing		-20.60%
Source(s) Source: "71 - Livingstone-Macleod, 2012 Alberta general election". officialresults.elections.ab.ca. Elections Alberta.

=== 2008 ===
2008 Alberta general election
Party	Candidate	Votes	%	±%
Progressive Conservative	Evan P. Berger	6,037	64.18%	13.17%
Liberal	Mike Judd	1,534	16.31%	-4.15%
Wildrose	John W. McLeod	988	10.50%	–
New Democratic	Phil Burpee	476	5.06%	-1.23%
Green	Bryan Hunt	371	3.94%	0.03%
Total		9,406	–	–
Rejected, spoiled and declined		48	7	3
Eligible electors / turnout		24,682	38.34%	-6.51%
Progressive Conservative hold		Swing		8.66%
Source(s) Source: "67 - Livingstone-Macleod, 2008 Alberta general election". officialresults.elections.ab.ca. Elections Alberta.

=== 2004 ===
2004 Alberta general election
Party	Candidate	Votes	%	±%
Progressive Conservative	David Coutts	5,097	51.02%	-9.67%
Liberal	Craig Whitehead	2,044	20.46%	-8.59%
Alberta Alliance	George Lyster	1,492	14.93%	–
New Democratic	Joyce Thomas	628	6.29%	0.99%
Green	Chris Watts	391	3.91%	–
Separation	Jim Walker	339	3.39%	–
Total		9,991	–	–
Rejected, spoiled and declined		34	35	5
Eligible electors / turnout		22,361	44.85%	1.65%
Progressive Conservative hold		Swing		-0.54%
Source(s) Source: "Livingstone-Macleod Statement of Official Results 2004 Alberta general election" (PDF). Elections Alberta.

=== 2001 ===
2001 Alberta general election
Party	Candidate	Votes	%	±%
Progressive Conservative	David Coutts	6,340	60.69%	9.72%
Liberal	Ernie Patterson	3,035	29.05%	-8.42%
New Democratic	James Tweedie	553	5.29%	0.44%
Alberta First	Larry Lybbert	519	4.97%	–
Total		10,447	–	–
Rejected, spoiled and declined		59	–	–
Eligible electors / turnout		24,270	43.20%	5.05%
Progressive Conservative hold		Swing		9.07%
Source(s) Source: "Livingstone-Macleod Official Results 2001 Alberta general election". Alberta Heritage Community Foundation.

=== 1997 ===
1997 Alberta general election
Party	Candidate	Votes	%	±%
Progressive Conservative	David Coutts	5,337	50.96%	–
Liberal	Ernie Patterson	3,924	37.47%	–
Social Credit	Bob Bysouth	703	6.71%	–
New Democratic	Gwen De Maere	508	4.85%	–
Total		10,472	–	–
Rejected, spoiled and declined		25	–	–
Eligible electors / turnout		27,516	38.15%	–
Progressive Conservative pickup new district.				
Source(s) Source: "Livingstone-Macleod Official Results 1997 Alberta general election". Alberta Heritage Community Foundation.

== Senate nominee election results ==
=== 2004 ===
2004 Senate nominee election results: Livingstone-Macleod				Turnout 44.79%	
Affiliation	Candidate	Votes	% votes	% ballots	Rank
Progressive Conservative	Bert Brown	3,969	16.02%	49.30%	1
Progressive Conservative	Betty Unger	2,972	11.99%	36.92%	2
Independent	Link Byfield	2,762	11.15%	34.31%	4
Progressive Conservative	Cliff Breitkreuz	2,606	10.52%	32.37%	3
Alberta Alliance	Vance Gough	2,461	9.93%	30.57%	8
Progressive Conservative	Jim Silye	2,271	9.16%	28.21%	5
Alberta Alliance	Michael Roth	2,180	8.80%	27.08%	7
Progressive Conservative	David Usherwood	2,061	8.32%	25.60%	6
Alberta Alliance	Gary Horan	2,022	8.16%	25.12%	10
Independent	Tom Sindlinger	1,477	5.95%	18.35%	9
Total votes		24,781	100%		
Total ballots		8,051	3.08 votes per ballot		
Rejected, spoiled and declined		1,964			

Voters had the option of selecting four candidates on the ballot

== Nomination contests ==
=== 2023 UCP Livingstone-Macleod nomination contest ===
March 9–11, 2023

Candidate
Candidate	Votes	%
Chelsae Petrovic	759	56.4
Tanya Clemens	469	34.8
Don Whalen	118	8.8
Total	1,346	100.0

== Student vote results ==
=== 2004 ===
Participating schools
Canyon School
Red Crow Community College
West Meadow School

On November 19, 2004, a student vote was conducted at participating Alberta schools to parallel the 2004 Alberta general election results. The vote was designed to educate students and simulate the electoral process for persons who have not yet reached the legal majority. The vote was conducted in 80 of the 83 provincial electoral districts with students voting for actual election candidates. Schools with a large student body that reside in another electoral district had the option to vote for candidates outside of the electoral district then where they were physically located.

2004 Alberta student vote results
Affiliation	Candidate	Votes	%
Progressive Conservative	David Coutts	143	41.45%
Liberal	Craig Whitehead	73	21.16%
Green	Chris Watts	50	14.49%
NDP	Joyce Thomas	31	8.99%
Separation	Jim Walker	25	7.25%
Alberta Alliance	George Lyster	23	6.66%
Total		345	100%
Rejected, spoiled and declined		37	

=== 2012 ===
2012 Alberta student vote results
Affiliation	Candidate	Votes	%
Progressive Conservative	Evan Berger		%
Wildrose	Pat Stier		
Evergreen	Larry Ashmore		%
Liberal	Alex Macdonald		%
NDP	Matthew Halton		%
Total			100%

== See also ==
- List of Alberta provincial electoral districts
- Canadian provincial electoral districts
