= John Oldring =

Canadian politician

The Honourable John Oldring ECA

MLA for Red Deer-South
- In office 1986–1993
- Succeeded by: Victor Doerksen

Personal details
- Born: September 1, 1952 (age 73)
- Party: Progressive Conservative

John Oldring ECA (born September 2, 1952) is a former municipal provincial level politician from Alberta, Canada. He served as a member of the Red Deer City Council from 1974 to 1986 before becoming a member of the Legislative Assembly of Alberta from 1986 to 1993.

== Political career ==
Oldring served for 12 years as a city councillor for the Red Deer City Council. He was first elected in 1974 and retired in 1986 to run for a seat in the Alberta Legislature. He ran as a Progressive Conservative candidate for the provincial general election held that year in the new electoral district of Red Deer South. Oldring won the district easily defeating two other candidates. He stood for a second term in office in the 1989 Alberta general election. He won his second term increasing his plurality. Oldring was appointed to the cabinet by Premier Don Getty after the election in 1989. He served as Minister of Family and Social Services and decided to run as a candidate in the 1992 Progressive Conservative Leadership Convention, eventually losing to Ralph Klein. After the leadership election Oldring was not reappointed to the cabinet and retired from provincial politics at dissolution of the Assembly in 1993.

Legislative Assembly of Alberta
| Preceded by New District | MLA Red Deer South; 1986-1993 | Succeeded by Victor Doerksen |
