= Cal Dallas =

Canadian politician (born 1956)

The Honourable Cal Dallas ECA

Member of the Legislative Assembly of Alberta for Red Deer-South
- In office March 3, 2008 – May 5, 2015
- Preceded by: Victor Doerksen
- Succeeded by: Barb Miller

Minister of International and Intergovernmental Relations and Aboriginal Relations in the Alberta government
- In office October 12, 2011 – May 8, 2012
- Preceded by: Iris Evans
- Succeeded by: Robin Campbell

Minister of International and Intergovernmental Relations in the Alberta government
- In office May 8, 2012 – May 24, 2015
- Preceded by: Iris Evans
- Succeeded by: Rachel Notley

Personal details
- Born: May 10, 1956 (age 70)
- Party: Progressive Conservative
- Spouse: Jacqueline
- Children: Scott and Alicia
- Occupation: Newspaper Publisher

Calvin Kenneth Dallas ECA (born May 10, 1956) is a Canadian politician and former Member of the Legislative Assembly of Alberta representing the constituency of Red Deer-South as a Progressive Conservative.

== Early life ==
Dallas grew up in Central Alberta, spending much of his childhood in Innisfail. After high school, he took farm and ranch management at Olds College.

Dallas then entered the printing and publishing industry where he remained for 25 years, spending nine of those years as publisher of the Red Deer Express. In 2004, he received the Bill Draayer Award from the Alberta Weekly Newspapers Association.

In 2004, Dallas became executive director of the Red Deer Chamber of Commerce.

== Political career ==
Dallas was elected as MLA of Red Deer-South for the second time in the 2012 Alberta general election, with support from 44 per cent of the voters in the constituency. In the 2008 Alberta general election, he won the election with 56 per cent of votes.

From 2011 to 2014 he served as the Minister of International and Intergovernmental Relations in Alberta. Prior to this role, he was appointed Parliamentary Assistant to the Minister of Finance and Enterprise, and Parliamentary Assistant to the Minister of Environment. Prior to this role he was appointed Parliamentary Assistant to the Minister of Environment.

In addition to his regular duties as MLA, he previously served as a member of the Public Accounts Committee, the Standing Committee on the Economy, and the Standing Committee on Private Bills. Dallas has also co-chaired the Climate-Change Central Board and the Overall Factors Task Team with the Alberta Competitiveness Initiative, was vice-chair of the Regulatory Enhancement Project Task force, was a member of the Regulatory Review Secretariat and has served on the Cabinet Policy Committee on Energy.

== Personal life ==
Dallas lives in Red Deer with his wife, Jacqueline. They have two adult children: Scott and Alicia.

Dallas is an active member of his community, where he has sat on the Red Deer College Board of Governors and the Mayor's Task Force on Homelessness. He has also been involved in a variety of organizations, events and recreational supports. Dallas is a former director of the Red Deer Rotary Club and the United Way of Central Alberta. He is also a former vice-president of the Alberta Chamber of Commerce.

In recognition of his involvement, Dallas has received numerous awards, including a 2005 Alberta Centennial Medal, a Queen Elizabeth II Golden Jubilee Medal in 2002 and the Canadian Chamber of Commerce volunteer of the year award in 2002.

== Election results ==
2008 Alberta general election: Red Deer-South
Party	Candidate	Votes	%	±%
Progressive Conservative	Cal Dallas	7,139	56.18%	11.27%
Liberal	Diane Kubanek	3,414	26.86%	-7.21%
Wildrose Alliance	Ed Klop	949	7.47%	–
Green	Evan Bedford	609	4.79%	–
New Democratic	Teresa Bryanton	597	4.70%	-2.28%
Total		12,708	–	–
Rejected, spoiled and declined		47	17	1
Eligible electors / turnout		34,703	36.76%	-6.94%
Progressive Conservative hold		Swing		9.24%
Source(s) Source: The Report on the March 3, 2008 Provincial General Election of the Twenty-seventh Legislative Assembly. Elections Alberta. July 28, 2008. pp. 512–517.

2012 Alberta general election: Red Deer-South
Party	Candidate	Votes	%	±%
Progressive Conservative	Cal Dallas	7,048	43.60%	-12.58%
Wildrose Alliance	Nathan Stephan	5,612	34.71%	27.25%
New Democratic	Lorna S. Watkinson-Zimmer	1,707	10.56%	5.86%
Liberal	Jason Chilibeck	1,195	7.39%	-19.47%
Alberta Party	Serge Gingras	604	3.74%	–
Total		16,166	–	–
Rejected, spoiled and declined		81	43	7
Eligible electors / turnout		32,708	49.69%	12.94%
Progressive Conservative hold		Swing		-10.21%
Source(s) Source: "76 - Red Deer-South, 2012 Alberta general election". officialresults.elections.ab.ca. Elections Alberta.
