= Victor Doerksen =

Canadian politician

The Honourable Victor Doerksen ECA

Member of the Legislative Assembly of Alberta for Red Deer South
- In office June 15, 1993 – March 3, 2008
- Preceded by: John Oldring
- Succeeded by: Cal Dallas

Personal details
- Born: Bassano, Alberta
- Party: Progressive Conservative
- Occupation: Accountant, Politician
- Website: victordoerksen.ca

Victor Doerksen ECA is a politician, accountant and former cabinet minister in Alberta, Canada.

== Early life ==
Doerksen was born in Bassano, Alberta. He was employed by the Bank of Montreal for 12 years. He left his job to run for political office a day after hearing about John Oldring retiring as MLA for Red Deer South.

== Albertan politician ==
Doerksen was first elected to the riding of Red Deer South after it was created from the old Red Deer riding in the 1993 Alberta general election. He held the seat for 4 terms for the Progressive Conservatives and did not seek re-election in the 2008 election.

After winning his 3rd term in office in the 2001 election, Doerksen was appointed as the Minister of Innovation and Science and sworn into the portfolio in 2001.

Doerksen quit his post as the Minister of Innovation and Science on August 15, 2006, and announced his candidacy for the leadership of the Progressive Conservatives on August 17. He finished seventh of eight candidates on the first ballot with less than one percent of the vote; after being required to drop out, he declined to endorse any of his opponents.

Legislative Assembly of Alberta
Preceded by John Oldring	MLA Red Deer South; 1993-2008	Succeeded by Cal Dallas
