= Red Deer-South =

Provincial electoral district in Alberta, Canada

Coordinates: 52.247°N 113.800°W

Alberta electoral district
- Red Deer-South within the City of Red Deer, 2017 boundaries

Provincial electoral district
- Legislature: Legislative Assembly of Alberta
MLA
Jason Stephan
United Conservative
- District created: 1986
- First contested: 1986
- Last contested: 2023

Red Deer-South is a provincial electoral district for the Legislative Assembly of Alberta, Canada. The district was created from Red Deer in 1986. Under the Alberta electoral boundary re-distribution of 2004, the constituency borders Red Deer North at the Red Deer River, Taylor Drive, Ross Street, 30th Avenue and 39th Street. At the city limits, the constituency is bounded by Innisfail-Sylvan Lake.

The current MLA for this district is Jason Stephan from the United Conservative Party.

== History ==
The electoral district was created in the 1985 boundary redistribution from the Red Deer provincial electoral district. The city of Red Deer had been contained in a single electoral district since 1888 when it first started returning members to the Legislative Assembly of the Northwest Territories. The city was split into South and Red Deer-North.

The 2010 boundary redistribution saw adjustments made to the boundary with Red Deer-North to equalize the population between the two constituencies.

=== Boundary history ===
72 Red Deer-South 2003 boundaries
Bordering districts
North	East	West	South
Red Deer-North	Innisfail-Sylvan Lake	Innisfail-Sylvan Lake	Innisfail-Sylvan Lake
riding map goes here		map in relation to other districts in Alberta goes here	
Legal description from the Statutes of Alberta 2003, Electoral Divisions Act
Starting at the intersection of the west City of Red Deer boundary with the right bank of the Red Deer River near the northerly extension of 60 Avenue; then 1. generally northeast along the right bank of the Red Deer River to Taylor Drive; 2. southeast along Taylor Drive to Ross Street (50 Street); 3. east along Ross Street (50 Street) and its extension to the east boundary of the City of Red Deer (Range Road 271); 4. south, west, northwest and north along the City of Red Deer boundary to the starting point.

76 Red Deer-South 2010 boundaries
Bordering districts
North	East	West	South
Red Deer-North	Innisfail-Sylvan Lake	Innisfail-Sylvan Lake	Innisfail-Sylvan Lake
Legal description from the Statutes of Alberta 2010, Electoral Divisions Act

=== Representation history ===
Members of the Legislative Assembly for Red Deer-South
Assembly	Years	Member	Party
See Red Deer 1905-1986
21st	1986–1989	John Oldring	Progressive; Conservative
22nd	1989–1993	John Oldring	Progressive; Conservative
23rd	1993–1997	Victor Doerksen	Progressive; Conservative
24th	1997–2001	Victor Doerksen	Progressive; Conservative
25th	2001–2004	Victor Doerksen	Progressive; Conservative
26th	2004–2008	Victor Doerksen	Progressive; Conservative
27th	2008–2012	Cal Dallas	Progressive; Conservative
28th	2012-2015	Cal Dallas	Progressive; Conservative
29th	2015–2019	Barb Miller	New Democratic
30th	2019–2023	Jason Stephan	United Conservative
31st	2023–present	Jason Stephan	United Conservative

Since the electoral district was created in 1986, the voters of Red Deer-South have returned Progressive Conservative candidates in every election until 2015, joining the province-wide NDP victory. The first representative was John Oldring who served two terms in office. He served as a cabinet minister in the government of Don Getty in his second term and retired in 1993 after a failed leadership bid for the Progressive Conservative Party.

Victor Doerksen was the second MLA for the district. He was first elected in 1993 after a very hotly contested election with a Liberal candidate. He would eke out his second term in 1997 facing another strong challenge from the Liberals. His third term would be won with the highest popular vote in the history of the riding. He would be appointed to cabinet in the government of Ralph Klein shortly after the election and hold his portfolio until 2006 when he resigned to run for leadership of the Progressive Conservatives. After his bid for leadership failed he retired from office in 2008.

The next representative was Cal Dallas, elected to his first term in 2008. He was appointed Minister of International and Intergovernmental Relations by Premier Allison Redford in October 2011.

== Legislative election results ==
=== 1986 ===
1986 Alberta general election
Party	Candidate	Votes	%	±%
Progressive Conservative	John Oldring	4,023	56.31%	–
New Democratic	Connie Barnaby	1,667	23.33%	–
Liberal	Lionel Lizee	1,455	20.36%	–
Total		7,145	–	–
Rejected, spoiled and declined		27	–	–
Eligible electors / turnout		17,339	41.36%	–
Progressive Conservative pickup new district.				
Source(s) Source: "Red Deer-South Official Results 1986 Alberta general election". Alberta Heritage Community Foundation.

=== 1989 ===
1989 Alberta general election
Party	Candidate	Votes	%	±%
Progressive Conservative	John Oldring	4,637	49.59%	-6.72%
Liberal	Roxanne V. Prior	2,874	30.73%	10.37%
New Democratic	Linda Ross	1,840	19.68%	-3.65%
Total		9,351	–	–
Rejected, spoiled and declined		38	–	–
Eligible electors / turnout		18,795	49.95%	8.59%
Progressive Conservative hold		Swing		-7.06%
Source(s) Source: "Red Deer-South Official Results 1989 Alberta general election". Alberta Heritage Community Foundation.

=== 1993 ===
1993 Alberta general election
Party	Candidate	Votes	%	±%
Progressive Conservative	Victor Doerksen	5,663	46.50%	-3.09%
Liberal	Don Sinclair	4,879	40.06%	9.33%
Social Credit	Randy Thorsteinson	882	7.24%	–
New Democratic	Malcolm Reville	639	5.25%	-14.43%
Natural Law	Ken Arnold	116	0.95%	–
Total		12,179	–	–
Rejected, spoiled and declined		20	–	–
Eligible electors / turnout		20,180	60.45%	10.50%
Progressive Conservative hold		Swing		-6.21%
Source(s) Source: "Red Deer-South Official Results 1993 Alberta general election". Alberta Heritage Community Foundation.

=== 1997 ===
1997 Alberta general election
Party	Candidate	Votes	%	±%
Progressive Conservative	Victor Doerksen	5,751	47.03%	0.53%
Liberal	Larry Pimm	4,966	40.61%	0.55%
Social Credit	Randy Thorsteinson	1,145	9.36%	2.12%
New Democratic	Joanne Stanley	367	3.00%	-2.25%
Total		12,229	–	–
Rejected, spoiled and declined		27	12	3
Eligible electors / turnout		21,537	56.92%	-3.53%
Progressive Conservative hold		Swing		-0.01%
Source(s) Source: "Red Deer-South Official Results 1997 Alberta general election". Alberta Heritage Community Foundation.

=== 2001 ===
2001 Alberta general election
Party	Candidate	Votes	%	±%
Progressive Conservative	Victor Doerksen	7,684	60.10%	13.07%
Liberal	Garfield Marks	3,927	30.72%	-9.89%
New Democratic	Erika Bullwinkle	512	4.00%	1.00%
Alberta First	Bob Argent	459	3.59%	–
Independent	Ryan Lamarche	203	1.59%	–
Total		12,785	–	–
Rejected, spoiled and declined		34	12	2
Eligible electors / turnout		25,283	50.71%	-6.21%
Progressive Conservative hold		Swing		11.48%
Source(s) Source: "Red Deer-South Official Results 2001 Alberta general election". Alberta Heritage Community Foundation.

=== 2004 ===
2004 Alberta general election
Party	Candidate	Votes	%	±%
Progressive Conservative	Victor Doerksen	5,373	44.91%	-15.19%
Liberal	Walter Kubanek	4,077	34.08%	3.36%
Alberta Alliance	Patti Argent	1,418	11.85%	–
New Democratic	Jeff Sloychuk	835	6.98%	2.97%
Separation	Judy Milne	261	2.18%	–
Total		11,964	–	–
Rejected, spoiled and declined		46	23	0
Eligible electors / turnout		27,486	43.69%	-7.01%
Progressive Conservative hold		Swing		-9.28%
Source(s) Source:

1. Results of the Separation Party compared to Alberta First Party

=== 2008 ===
2008 Alberta general election
Party	Candidate	Votes	%	±%
Progressive Conservative	Cal Dallas	7,139	56.18%	11.27%
Liberal	Diane Kubanek	3,414	26.86%	-7.21%
Wildrose Alliance	Ed Klop	949	7.47%	–
Green	Evan Bedford	609	4.79%	–
New Democratic	Teresa Bryanton	597	4.70%	-2.28%
Total		12,708	–	–
Rejected, spoiled and declined		47	17	1
Eligible electors / turnout		34,703	36.76%	-6.94%
Progressive Conservative hold		Swing		9.24%
Source(s) Source: The Report on the March 3, 2008 Provincial General Election of the Twenty-seventh Legislative Assembly. Elections Alberta. July 28, 2008. pp. 512–517.

=== 2012 ===
2012 Alberta general election
Party	Candidate	Votes	%	±%
Progressive Conservative	Cal Dallas	7,048	43.60%	-12.58%
Wildrose Alliance	Nathan Stephan	5,612	34.71%	27.25%
New Democratic	Lorna S. Watkinson-Zimmer	1,707	10.56%	5.86%
Liberal	Jason Chilibeck	1,195	7.39%	-19.47%
Alberta Party	Serge Gingras	604	3.74%	–
Total		16,166	–	–
Rejected, spoiled and declined		81	43	7
Eligible electors / turnout		32,708	49.69%	12.94%
Progressive Conservative hold		Swing		-10.21%
Source(s) Source: "76 - Red Deer-South, 2012 Alberta general election". officialresults.elections.ab.ca. Elections Alberta.

=== 2015 ===
2015 Alberta general election
Party	Candidate	Votes	%	±%
New Democratic	Barb Miller	7,024	35.86%	25.30%
Progressive Conservative	Darcy Mykytyshyn	5,414	27.64%	-15.96%
Wildrose	Norman Wiebe	4,812	24.56%	-10.15%
Alberta Party	Serge Gingras	1,035	5.28%	1.55%
Liberal	Deborah Checkel	738	3.77%	-3.62%
Green	Ben Dubois	274	1.40%	–
Independent	Patti Argent	232	1.18%	–
Independent	William Berry	60	0.31%	–
Total		19,589	–	–
Rejected, spoiled and declined		49	43	9
Eligible electors / turnout		37,771	52.02%	2.32%
New Democratic gain from Progressive Conservative		Swing		-0.33%
Source(s) Source: "76 - Red Deer-South, 2015 Alberta general election". officialresults.elections.ab.ca. Elections Alberta.

=== 2019 ===
2019 Alberta general election
Party	Candidate	Votes	%	±%
United Conservative	Jason Stephan	16,159	60.31%	8.11%
New Democratic	Barb Miller	6,844	25.54%	-10.31%
Alberta Party	Ryan Mcdougall	3,244	12.11%	6.82%
Freedom Conservative	Teah-Jay Cartwright	299	1.12%	–
Green	Lori Curran	246	0.92%	-0.48%
Total		26,792	–	–
Rejected, spoiled and declined		161	58	12
Eligible electors / turnout		37,495	71.92%	19.90%
United Conservative gain from New Democratic		Swing		13.27%
Source(s) Source: "79 - Red Deer-South, 2019 Alberta general election". officialresults.elections.ab.ca. Elections Alberta.

=== 2023 ===
2023 Alberta general election
Party	Candidate	Votes	%	±%
United Conservative	Jason Stephan	13,469	56.06	-4.25
New Democratic	Michelle Baer	9,976	41.52	+15.98
Green	Ashley MacDonald	274	1.14	+0.22
Wildrose Loyalty Coalition	Jesse Stretch	160	0.67	–
Solidarity Movement	Pamela Liebenberg	146	0.61	–
Total		24,025	99.36	–
Rejected and declined		155	0.64	
Turnout		24,180	61.81	
Eligible voters		39,120		
United Conservative hold		Swing		-10.11
Source(s) Source: Elections Alberta

== Senate nominee election results ==
=== 2004 ===
2004 Senate nominee election results: Red Deer-South				Turnout 44.58%	
Affiliation	Candidate	Votes	% votes	% ballots	Rank
Progressive Conservative	Betty Unger	3,837	13.64%	42.81%	2
Progressive Conservative	Bert Brown	3,708	13.18%	41.37%	1
Alberta Alliance	Michael Roth	3,192	11.35%	35.61%	7
Independent	Link Byfield	3,068	10.91%	34.23%	4
Progressive Conservative	Cliff Breitkreuz	2,865	10.18%	31.97%	3
Progressive Conservative	David Usherwood	2,439	8.67%	27.21%	6
Alberta Alliance	Vance Gough	2,438	8.66%	27.20%	8
Progressive Conservative	Jim Silye	2,376	8.45%	26.51%	5
Alberta Alliance	Gary Horan	2,257	8.02%	25.18%	10
Independent	Tom Sindlinger	1,955	6.94%	21.81%	9
Total votes		28,135	100%		
Total ballots		8,963	3.14 votes per ballot		
Rejected, spoiled and declined		3,290			

Voters had the option of selecting four candidates on the ballot.

=== 2012 ===
2012 Senate nominee election results: Red Deer-South				Turnout %	
Affiliation	Candidate	Votes	% votes	% ballots	Rank
Progressive Conservative	Doug Black	5,552			
Progressive Conservative	Scott Tannas	4,979			
Progressive Conservative	Mike Shaikh	4,053			
Wildrose	Rob Gregory	4,004			
Wildrose	Raymond Germain	3,954			
Wildrose	Victor Marciano	3,361			
Evergreen	Elizabeth Johannson	1,867			
Independent	Len Bracko	1,472			
Independent	David Fletcher	1,435			
Independent	Ian Urquhart	1,364			
Independent	Paul Frank	1,301			
Independent	William Exelby	942			
Independent	Perry Chahal	726			
Total votes		35,010	100%		
Total ballots		0	0 votes per ballot		
Rejected, spoiled and declined		0			

Voters had the option of selecting three candidates on the ballot.

== Student vote results ==
=== 2004 ===
Participating schools
Eastview Middle School
St. Francis of Assisi Middle School
St. Thomas Aquinas Middle School
Westpark Middle School

On November 19, 2004, a student vote was conducted at participating Alberta schools to parallel the 2004 Alberta general election results. The vote was designed to educate students and simulate the electoral process for persons who had not yet reached the legal majority. The vote was conducted in 80 of the 83 provincial electoral districts with students voting for actual election candidates. Schools with a large student body who reside in another electoral district had the option to vote for candidates outside of the electoral district than where they were physically located.

2004 Alberta student vote results
Affiliation	Candidate	Votes	%
Progressive Conservative	Victor Doerksen	355	29.81%
NDP	Jeff Sloychuk	294	24.68%
Liberal	Walter Kubanek	277	23.26%
Alberta Alliance	Patti Argent	194	16.29%
Separation	Judy Milne	71	5.96%
Total		1,191	100%
Rejected, spoiled and declined		38	

=== 2012 ===
Participating schools
École Secondaire Notre Dame High School

During the week of April 16, 2012 to April 20, 2012, a student vote was conducted at participating Alberta schools to parallel the 2012 Alberta general election results. The vote was designed to educate students and simulate the electoral process for persons who had not yet reached the legal majority. The vote was conducted in 86 of the 87 provincial electoral districts with students voting for actual election candidates. Students from École Secondaire Notre Dame High School participated in the vote on April 19, 2012.

2012 Alberta student vote results
Affiliation	Candidate	Votes	%
Progressive Conservative	Cal Dallas	115	32.95%
Wildrose	Nathan Stephan	68	19.48%
NDP	Lorna Watkinson-Zimmer	55	15.76%
Liberal	Jason Chilibeck	52	14.90%
Alberta Party	Serge Gingras	29	8.31%
Total		349	100%
Rejected, spoiled and declined		30	

== See also ==
- List of Alberta provincial electoral districts
- Canadian provincial electoral districts
