= Jason Stephan =

Canadian politician

Jason Stephan MLA

Member of the Legislative Assembly of Alberta for Red Deer-South
- Incumbent
- Assumed office April 16, 2019
- Preceded by: Barb Miller

Personal details
- Party: United Conservative Party
- Occupation: accountant, lawyer

Jason Stephan is a Canadian tax lawyer, chartered accountant and politician elected in the 2019 Alberta general election to represent the electoral district of Red Deer-South in the 30th Alberta Legislature as a member of the United Conservative Party. Stephan is the founder of the Red Deer Taxpayers Association.

== Political career ==
MLA Stephan currently serves on the Standing Committee on Alberta's Economic Future as well as the Standing Committee on Public Accounts. Mr. Stephan has previously served on the Select Special Committee to Examine Safe Supply, the Standing Committee on Privileges and Elections, Standing Orders and Printing, as well as the Select Special Information and Privacy Commissioner Search Committee among others.

Jason Stephan has been an outspoken critic of Canada's equalization system and of the federal government's Just Transition Plan, often speaking to them as ways the federal government takes advantage of Alberta.

As a legislator, MLA Stephan has pushed for accountability on multiple projects, including the AHS expansion of the Red Deer Hospital and more funding into primary care.

In January 2021, Stephan was found to be vacationing in Phoenix, Arizona, during the ongoing COVID-19 pandemic and was asked to resign from his position on the Treasury Board as a result. He defended his choice by stating that “International travel, in and of itself, does not negatively impact Alberta’s COVID curve if it is done responsibly.” He also said that "I do not consider myself an exception to health guidelines. I have never asked Albertans to do things that I myself would not do – and that includes not travelling". Later that year, Stephan requested for a public inquiry into harms of COVID-19 restrictions, often being more critical of restrictions during the pandemic.

During the 2024 United Conservative Party Annual General Meeting, Stephan supported a member statement in the legislature, stating that he supported the citizen initiative process to be used to hold a referendum on “late-term abortion.” As minister of constitutional affairs, he became the first Alberta MLA to publicly express support for an independence referendum. In March 2026, Stephan reiterated his support for an independence referendum in an op-ed to Western Standard, and in September 2026, he announced that he had voted in favour of a binding referendum on separation during the 2026 Alberta referendum

A recall petition against Stephan was approved by Elections Alberta on November 14, 2025. Signature collection ran from November 26, 2025, to February 23, 2026, gathering 4,255 of the required 14,508 signatures. On October 19, 2026, following the independence referendum, Stephan announced that he would not stand for re-election in 2027.

== Electoral history ==
=== 2023 general election ===
2023 Alberta general election: Red Deer-South
Party	Candidate	Votes	%	±%
United Conservative	Jason Stephan	13,469	56.06	-4.25
New Democratic	Michelle Baer	9,976	41.52	+15.98
Green	Ashley MacDonald	274	1.14	+0.22
Wildrose Loyalty Coalition	Jesse Stretch	160	0.67	–
Solidarity Movement	Pamela Liebenberg	146	0.61	–
Total		24,025	99.36	–
Rejected and declined		155	0.64	
Turnout		24,180	61.81	
Eligible voters		39,120		
United Conservative hold		Swing		-10.11
Source(s) Source: Elections Alberta

=== 2023 UCP Red Deer-South nomination contest ===
March 4, 2023

Candidate
Candidate	Votes	%
Jason Stephan	591	71.7
Adele Poratto	233	28.3
Total	824	100.00

=== 2019 general election ===
2019 Alberta general election: Red Deer-South
Party	Candidate	Votes	%	±%
United Conservative	Jason Stephan	16,159	60.31%	8.11%
New Democratic	Barb Miller	6,844	25.54%	-10.31%
Alberta Party	Ryan Mcdougall	3,244	12.11%	6.82%
Freedom Conservative	Teah-Jay Cartwright	299	1.12%	–
Green	Lori Curran	246	0.92%	-0.48%
Total		26,792	–	–
Rejected, spoiled and declined		161	58	12
Eligible electors / turnout		37,495	71.92%	19.90%
United Conservative gain from New Democratic		Swing		13.27%
Source(s) Source: "79 - Red Deer-South, 2019 Alberta general election". officialresults.elections.ab.ca. Elections Alberta.
