= Health Statutes Amendment Act, 2020 =

Omnibus health bill in Alberta, Canada

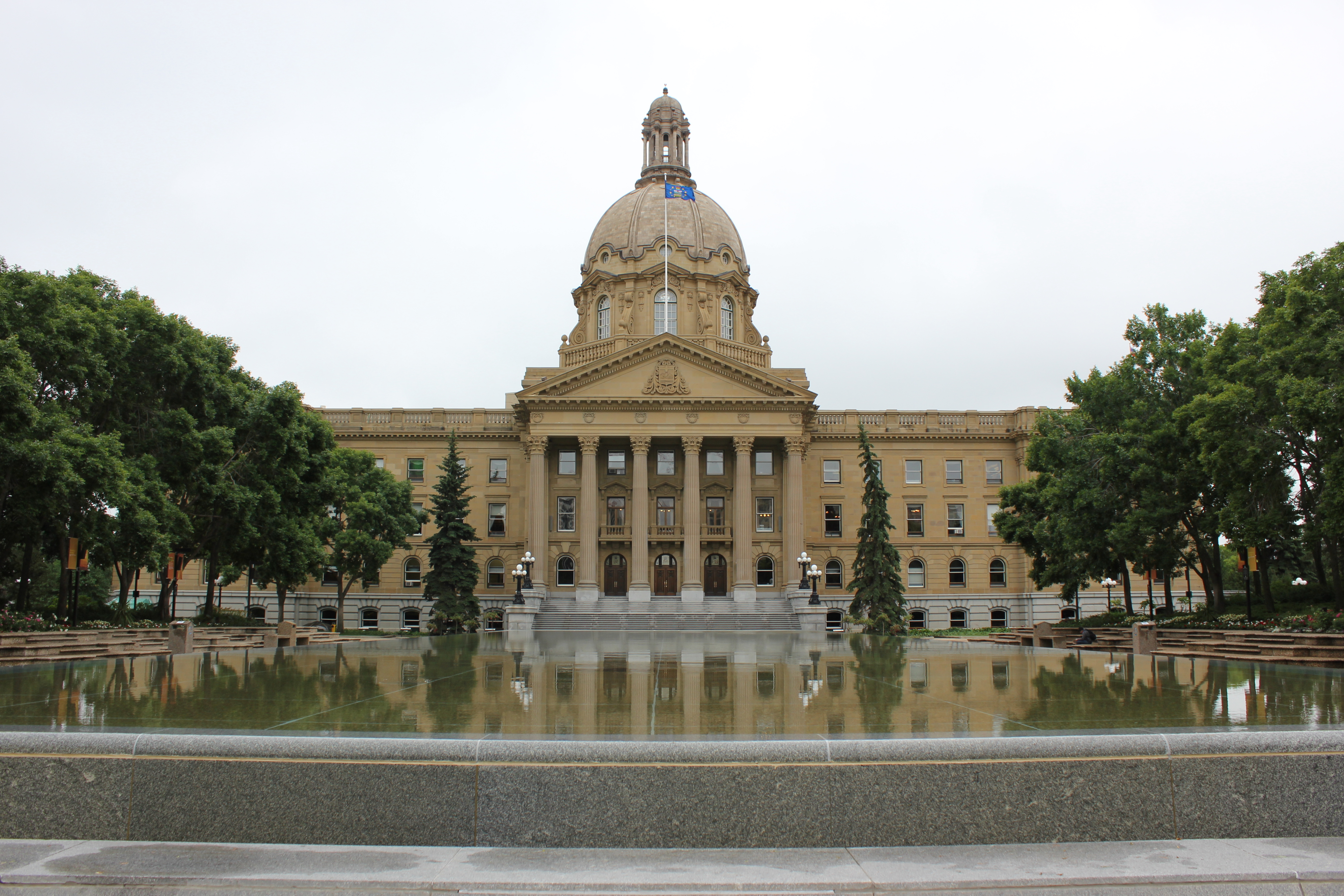

Legislative Assembly of Alberta
- Enacted by: Legislative Assembly of Alberta
- Commenced: July 6, 2020

Legislative history
- Bill citation: Bill 30
- Introduced by: Tyler Shandro
- First reading: July 6, 2020
- Second reading: July 7, 2020 – July 23
- Third reading: July 28 - July 29

The Health Statutes Amendment Act, 2020, otherwise known as Bill 30, is an omnibus bill introduced on July 6, 2020, by the Canadian province of Alberta's United Conservative Party's (UCP) Minister of Health Tyler Shandro. Its passed its 1st reading on July 6, its 2nd reading on July 23, and its 3rd reading on July 29. It was the last piece of legislation during the spring session of the 30th Alberta Legislature.

== Overview ==
Tyler Shandro, Health Minister, introduced Bill 30 on July 6, 2020, and its 1st reading was on the same day. Its 2nd reading was from July 7 to July 23, and its 3rd reading was a "marathon overnight sitting" on July 28 to July 29, on the final day of the second session.

According to the UCP government, Health Statutes Amendment Act, 2020 (Bill 30) changed nine pieces of health legislation intended to ensure that Albertans have access to "high quality, sustainable, person-centred health services." The legislation that was amended or repealed, included the Health Quality Council of Alberta Amendment Act, the Health Professions Amendment Act, the Health Care Protection Amendment Act, the Alberta Health Care Insurance Amendment Act, the Regional Health Authorities Amendment Act, the Hospitals Amendment Act, the Public Health Act, the Health Governance Transition Act, and the Provincial Health Authorities of Alberta Act.

On July 6, Shandro said that Bill 30 is intended to "streamline services" and to fulfill campaign promises, which includes decreasing wait times for surgeries.

Bill 30 modified "physician compensation models" which will result in private clinics performing more surgeries, allowing more private clinics to handle surgeries, appointing more citizens to the boards of college councils, tribunals and the complaints review committee.

The official opposition party, the New Democrat Party (NDP) as well as health professionals, raised concerns that Bill 30 would "bring 'American-style' private health care" to Alberta.

A University of Calgary specialist in health law and policy, Lorian Hardcastle, said that one of the most significant changes brought about by Bill 30, is the amendment to the Health Quality Council of Alberta Amendment Act which governs the Health Quality Council of Alberta (HQCA). The HGCA served as an objective agency, mandated to monitor and measure aspects of Alberta's health system, and to make recommendations best interest of patients and the healthcare system, at arms length from the government. Bill 30 turns the HQCA into an "arm" of the Alberta government, according to Hardcastle. The Bill 30 amendment places the HGCA directly under the authority of Minister Shandro. According to Hardcastle, this means that the council will be less likely to challenge government decisions. In June 2019, then HQCA CEO, Andrew Neuner, said that the government's cancellation of Edmonton's proposed superlab, did not "change the evidence" that supported the "need for a superlab in Edmonton", that had been compiled over a period of three years and presented in the HQCA's January 2016 report "Moving Ahead on Transformation of Laboratory Services in Alberta". The loss of this freedom from political intervention was one of the reasons cited by University of Alberta law professor Ubaka Ogbogu in his July 20 resignation from HGCA's board of directors. Ogbogu said that the in removing HQCA's independence from the government, the council would lose its reputation for credibility and objectivity. In his letter, Ogbogu cited concerns that the Alberta government had failed to consult with the HQCA before introducing Bill 30—just as it failed to consult with other "vital partners"—in regards to "fundamental changes to the healthcare system."

Another major change is in the Health Professions Amendment Act in Bill 30, which alters the composition of boards of directors of health professional's tribunals, college councils, tribunals and committees, such as complaints reviews, by increasing public membership in these oversight bodies to 50 percent. Hardcastle raised concerns that the "self-regulatory nature of these of these college councils" could be undermined if the government appoints "people who are politically aligned with the government."

== See also ==
- Bill 1 An Act to Repeal the Carbon Tax
- Bill 9 Public Sector Wage Arbitration Deferral Act
