= Trespass to Premises Act (Alberta) =

Albertan law

The Trespass to Premises Act was passed by Alberta's 30th Legislature in autumn 2019. Because the province is unable to write criminal legislation it is a remedy in the civil law, under which the penalties include fines and up to six months in jail.
