= Evan Berger (politician) =

Canadian politician (born 1960)

The Honourable Evan Berger ECA

MLA for Livingstone-Macleod
- In office 2008–2012
- Preceded by: David Coutts
- Succeeded by: Pat Stier

Personal details
- Born: April 2, 1960 (age 66) High River, Alberta, Canada
- Party: Progressive Conservative
- Spouse: Laurie
- Children: Talia, Brita, and Joel

For the Australian former footballer, see Evan Berger.

Evan Berger ECA (born April 2, 1960) is a Canadian politician and former Member of the Legislative Assembly of Alberta. He represented the constituency of Livingstone-Macleod as a Progressive Conservative from 2008 to 2012.

== Early life ==
Berger was born April 2, 1960, in High River. He was raised on a mixed ranch farm in the foothills southwest of Nanton, Alberta. After high school, Berger entered the Southern Alberta Institute of Technology (SAIT) in Calgary, but left to pursue a land purchase opportunity. He has been involved in the agriculture industry since.

== Political life ==
Berger won his seat in the 2008 provincial election with 64 per cent of the vote in the constituency of Livingstone-Macleod. He currently serves as Parliamentary Assistant to the Minister of Sustainable Resource Development and sits on the Cabinet Policy Committee on Resources and the Environment. Berger chaired the Land-use Framework MLA Committee. He was a member of the Standing Committee on Resource and Environment; the Standing Committee on Privileges and Elections, Standing Orders and Printing; and the First Nations/Metis/Inuit Workforce Action Plan MLA Committee.

Prior to becoming an MLA, Berger spent nearly 16 years in municipal politics, as a member of council in the municipal district of Willow Creek. During his council terms, he served as reeve for nine years and spent six years as chair of the Municipal Planning Commission and the Agricultural Service Board.

By a vote margin of less than 1,200 votes, Mr. Berger was defeated by Wildrose candidate Pat Stier in April, 2012. Alberta Premier Alison Redford appointed Berger to a position paying approximately $150,000 per year a few months after his defeat. He remained a member of the PC Party and ran again for his old seat during the 2015 election. During the campaign, Premier Jim Prentice appeared alongside Berger during his campaign. Berger once again lost to Stier on election day.

== Personal life ==
Berger lives in Nanton with his wife, Laurie, and their three children: Talia, Brita and Joel. He is still actively involved in agriculture, but has cut back on his workload by letting go of rented land and paring down his cow herd.

== Electoral results ==
2015 Alberta general election: Livingstone-Macleod
Party	Candidate	Votes	%	±%
Wildrose	Pat Stier	7,362	39.89%	-8.17%
Progressive Conservative	Evan P. Berger	6,404	34.69%	-6.68%
New Democratic	Aileen Burke	4,228	22.91%	17.62%
Liberal	Alida Hess	464	2.51%	-0.83%
Total		18,458	–	–
Rejected, spoiled and declined		55	14	29
Eligible electors / turnout		32,991	56.16%	-4.31%
Wildrose hold		Swing		-0.74%
Source(s) Source: "71 - Livingstone-Macleod, 2015 Alberta general election". officialresults.elections.ab.ca. Elections Alberta.

2012 Alberta general election: Livingstone-Macleod
Party	Candidate	Votes	%	±%
Wildrose	Pat Stier	8,577	48.05%	37.55%
Progressive Conservative	Evan P. Berger	7,385	41.37%	-22.81%
New Democratic	Matthew Halton	944	5.29%	0.23%
Liberal	Alex MacDonald	597	3.34%	-12.96%
Evergreen	Larry Ashmore	346	1.94%	–
Total		17,849	–	–
Rejected, spoiled and declined		66	9	44
Eligible electors / turnout		29,644	60.46%	22.12%
Wildrose gain from Progressive Conservative		Swing		-20.60%
Source(s) Source: "71 - Livingstone-Macleod, 2012 Alberta general election". officialresults.elections.ab.ca. Elections Alberta.

2008 Alberta general election: Livingstone-Macleod
Party	Candidate	Votes	%	±%
Progressive Conservative	Evan P. Berger	6,037	64.18%	13.17%
Liberal	Mike Judd	1,534	16.31%	-4.15%
Wildrose	John W. McLeod	988	10.50%	–
New Democratic	Phil Burpee	476	5.06%	-1.23%
Green	Bryan Hunt	371	3.94%	0.03%
Total		9,406	–	–
Rejected, spoiled and declined		48	7	3
Eligible electors / turnout		24,682	38.34%	-6.51%
Progressive Conservative hold		Swing		8.66%
Source(s) Source: "67 - Livingstone-Macleod, 2008 Alberta general election". officialresults.elections.ab.ca. Elections Alberta.
