= Pat Stier =

Canadian politician

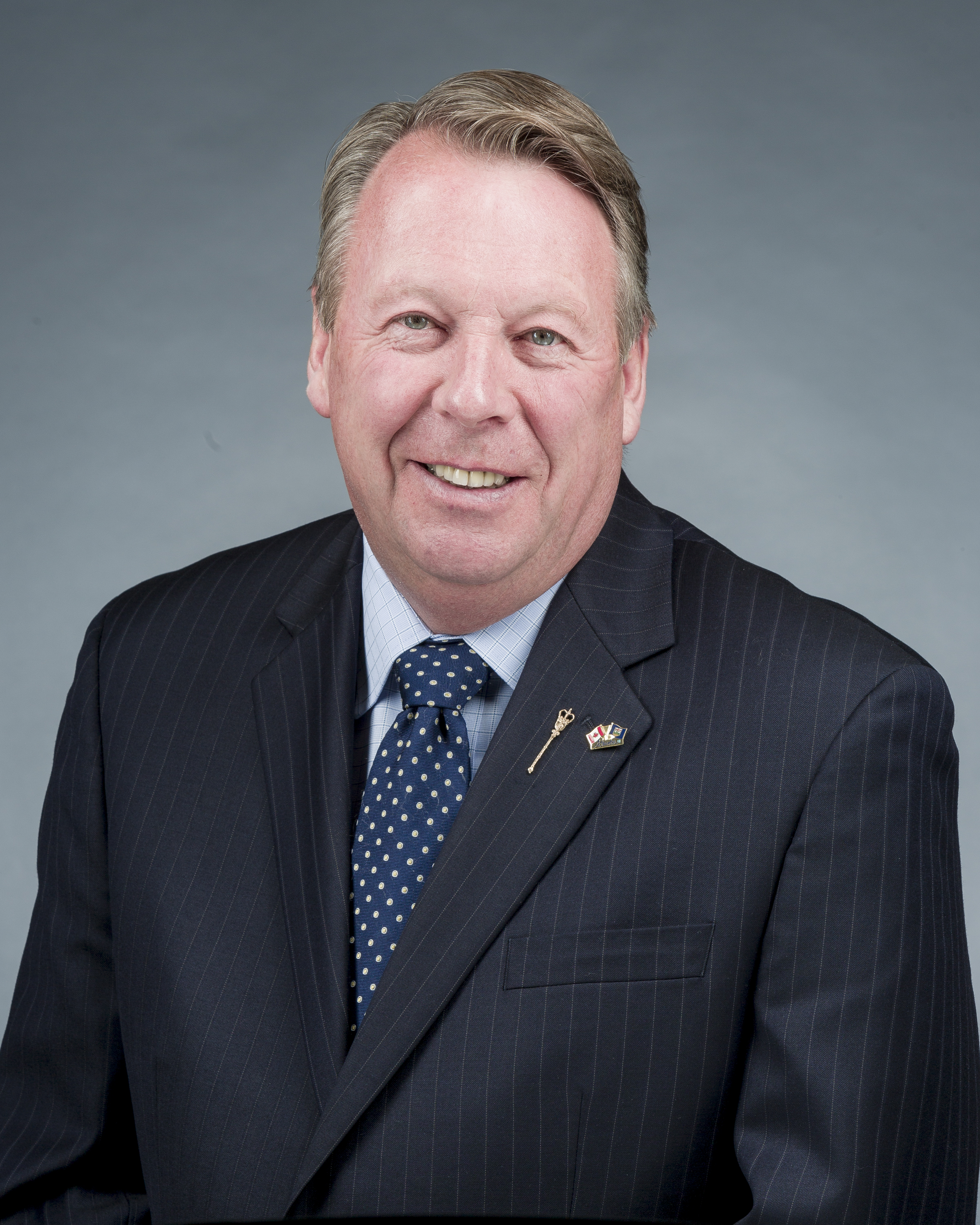

Member of the Legislative Assembly of Alberta for Livingstone-Macleod
- In office April 23, 2012 – March 19, 2019
- Preceded by: Evan Berger
- Succeeded by: Roger Reid

Personal details
- Born: Patrick David Stier; 1954 (age 71–72) Foothills No. 31, Alberta
- Party: United Conservative Party
- Profession: Oil and gas

Patrick David Stier (born 1954) is a Canadian politician, who is an elected member to the Legislative Assembly of Alberta, representing the electoral district of Livingstone-Macleod. He sat with the Official Opposition as a member of the United Conservative Party and was the Municipal Affairs Critic.

== Political career ==
Stier has 30 years of farming experience and 15 years of service with municipal government, including four years as a municipal councillor with Municipal District of Foothills #31 in 2004–2007. He was also co-chair of the Subdivision and Development Appeal Board at MD of Foothills #31. In the 2012 election, Stier defeated Progressive Conservative candidate and Agriculture minister Evan Berger, who went on to be hired as a senior policy advisory to the deputy Agriculture minister.

As an MLA, Stier has spoken out against the Alberta Health Services policy of separating married seniors in nursing homes. Stier and Wildrose Party Leader Danielle Smith criticized the Provincial Government for cancelling plans to build the Alberta Public Security and Law Enforcement Training college in Fort Macleod.

In the 2013 spring sitting, Stier brought forward Motion 507 to repeal the Alberta Land Stewardship Act and create a new land use framework “that better protects the rights of landowners and respects the role of locally elected and accountable municipal councils.” The motion did not pass. He was reelected in the 2015 Alberta general election, once again facing Berger as a PC challenger.

In July, 2017 Stier remained the MLA for Livingstone-Macleod under the establishment of The United Conservative Party (UCP). The UCP is a political party which forms the official opposition in Alberta, Canada. It was established in July 2017 as a merger between the Progressive Conservative Association of Alberta and the Wildrose Party.

== Professional career ==
Stier was raised on the family ranch near De Winton, where his family raised Arabian horses and Angus cattle as well as farmed crops. He has lived in the Foothills area of Alberta all of his life. He attended junior high and high school in Okotoks, graduating in 1972. He was employed primarily in the seismic data segment of the oil and gas industry for 25 years in Calgary.

== Electoral history ==
=== 2012 general election ===
2012 Alberta general election: Livingstone-Macleod
Party	Candidate	Votes	%	±%
Wildrose	Pat Stier	8,577	48.05%	37.55%
Progressive Conservative	Evan P. Berger	7,385	41.37%	-22.81%
New Democratic	Matthew Halton	944	5.29%	0.23%
Liberal	Alex MacDonald	597	3.34%	-12.96%
Evergreen	Larry Ashmore	346	1.94%	–
Total		17,849	–	–
Rejected, spoiled and declined		66	9	44
Eligible electors / turnout		29,644	60.46%	22.12%
Wildrose gain from Progressive Conservative		Swing		-20.60%
Source(s) Source: "71 - Livingstone-Macleod, 2012 Alberta general election". officialresults.elections.ab.ca. Elections Alberta.

=== 2015 general election ===
2015 Alberta general election: Livingstone-Macleod
Party	Candidate	Votes	%	±%
Wildrose	Pat Stier	7,362	39.89%	-8.17%
Progressive Conservative	Evan P. Berger	6,404	34.69%	-6.68%
New Democratic	Aileen Burke	4,228	22.91%	17.62%
Liberal	Alida Hess	464	2.51%	-0.83%
Total		18,458	–	–
Rejected, spoiled and declined		55	14	29
Eligible electors / turnout		32,991	56.16%	-4.31%
Wildrose hold		Swing		-0.74%
Source(s) Source: "71 - Livingstone-Macleod, 2015 Alberta general election". officialresults.elections.ab.ca. Elections Alberta.
