= Chelsae Petrovic =

Canadian politician from Alberta

Member of the Legislative Assembly of Alberta for Livingstone-Macleod
- Incumbent
- Assumed office May 29, 2023
- Preceded by: Roger Reid

Parliamentary Secretary for Health Workforce Engagement
- Incumbent
- Assumed office March 21, 2024

Mayor of Claresholm, Alberta
- In office October 18, 2021 – May 30, 2023

Personal details
- Party: UCP
- Education: Lethbridge College

Chelsae Petrovic is a Canadian politician from the United Conservative Party. She was elected member of the Legislative Assembly of Alberta for Livingstone-Macleod in the 2023 Alberta general election.

Prior to being elected as an MLA, Petrovic served as the mayor of Claresholm and was employed as a nurse.

== Electoral history ==
=== 2023 general election ===
2023 Alberta general election: Livingstone-Macleod
Party	Candidate	Votes	%	±%
United Conservative	Chelsae Petrovic	16,491	66.94	-3.70
New Democratic	Kevin Van Tighem	6,492	26.35	+5.83
Alberta Party	Kevin Todd	975	3.96	-1.15
Alberta Independence	Corrie Reed Toone	353	1.43	-0.29
Liberal	Dylin Hauser	194	0.79	-0.25
Independent	Erik Abildgaard	130	0.53	–
Total		24,635	99.51	–
Rejected and declined		122	0.49	
Turnout		24,757	64.47	
Eligible voters		38,398		
United Conservative hold		Swing		-4.77
Source(s) Source: Elections Alberta

=== 2023 UCP Livingstone-Macleod nomination contest ===
March 9–11, 2023

Candidate
Candidate	Votes	%
Chelsae Petrovic	759	56.4
Tanya Clemens	469	34.8
Don Whalen	118	8.8
Total	1,346	100.0
