= Roger Reid (politician) =

Canadian politician

Member of the Legislative Assembly of Alberta for Livingstone-Macleod
- In office April 16, 2019 – May 29, 2023
- Preceded by: Pat Stier
- Succeeded by: Chelsae Petrovic

Personal details
- Born: April 28, 1967 (age 58)
- Party: United Conservative Party
- Occupation: Businessman

Roger Reid (born April 28, 1967) is a Canadian politician who was elected in the 2019 Alberta general election to represent the electoral district of Livingstone-Macleod in the 30th Alberta Legislature. He is a member of the United Conservative Party. He stood down at the 2023 Alberta general election.

== Career ==
=== Before Entering Politics ===
Prior to serving with the Legislative Assembly, he owned and operated multiple franchise businesses in Claresholm and Nanton for close to a decade. Previous to this, he worked in the marketing/communications and graphic design fields.

Reid served as chair of the Claresholm and District Health Foundation from 2015 to 2019, and he volunteered with an electoral district association from 2015 to 2019.

== Electoral history ==
2019 Alberta general election: Livingstone-Macleod
Party	Candidate	Votes	%	±%
United Conservative	Roger Reid	17,644	70.64	-2.97
New Democratic	Cam Gardner	5,125	20.52	-0.93
Alberta Party	Tim Meech	1,276	5.11	+3.18
Alberta Independence	Vern Sparkes	430	1.72	–
Liberal	Dylin Hauser	258	1.03	-0.79
Green	Wendy Pergentile	244	0.98	+0.24
Total		24,977	99.22	–
Rejected, spoiled and declined		197	0.78	
Turnout		25,174	69.59	
Eligible voters		36,173		
United Conservative notional hold		Swing		-1.02
Source(s) Source: "73 - Livingstone-Macleod, 2019 Alberta general election". officialresults.elections.ab.ca. Elections Alberta.
