= Pamela Snelgrove-Paul =

Canadian politician

Pamela "Pam" Snelgrove-Paul is a Canadian politician who has served various positions on the provincial and municipal levels of government. She served in opposition as a member of the Legislative Assembly of Alberta from 1997 to 2001, sitting initially with the Liberal caucus and later as an independent MLA.

== Early life ==
Paul was born in Shelburne, Nova Scotia.

== Political career ==
Paul has served as a public school trustee and alderman for the City of St. Albert under her married name of Pam Smith. She was elected in a hotly contested race in Edmonton Castle Downs in the 1997 provincial election by just 83 votes, for the Alberta Liberal Party.

While serving as member of the Legislative Assembly, Paul's divorced husband was arrested for domestic abuse, including tire-slashing, stocking, death threats, and having a rifle in his possession.

She used her time as MLA to bring domestic violence, and woman's rights issues into the public spotlight.

In 1999 she sat as an independent after her experiences created turmoil in the Liberal caucus and did not run in the 2001 election.

Paul became an International Women's Day Award Recipient in 2005.

=== Electoral results ===
1997 Alberta general election: Edmonton-Castle Downs
Party	Candidate	Votes	%	±%
Liberal	Pamela Paul	4,456	41.32%	–
Progressive Conservative	Ihor Broda	4,373	40.55%	–
New Democratic	Peter Johnsen	1,494	13.86%	–
Social Credit	David H. Friesen	460	4.27%	–
Total		10,783	–	–
Rejected, spoiled and declined		32	–	–
Eligible electors / turnout		21,400	50.54%	–
Liberal pickup new district.				
Source(s) Source: "Edmonton-Castle Downs Official Results 1997 Alberta general election". Alberta Heritage Community Foundation.

Legislative Assembly of Alberta
Preceded by New District	MLA Edmonton Castle Downs; 1997-2001	Succeeded by Thomas Lukaszuk
