= David Coutts =

Canadian politician (b. 1945)

The Honourable David Coutts ECA

MLA for Livingstone-Macleod
- In office June 15, 1993 – March 3, 2008
- Preceded by: new district
- Succeeded by: Evan Berger

Personal details
- Born: July 16, 1945 (age 80) Fort Macleod, Alberta
- Party: Progressive Conservative

David Conrad Coutts ECA is a Canadian politician who represented the electoral district of Livingstone-Macleod in the Legislative Assembly of Alberta. He is a member of the Progressive Conservative Party. He was first elected in the 1993 election and was re-elected three times before declining to seek re-election in the 2008 vote.
