= Nicole Goehring =

Canadian politician

Nicole Goehring MLA
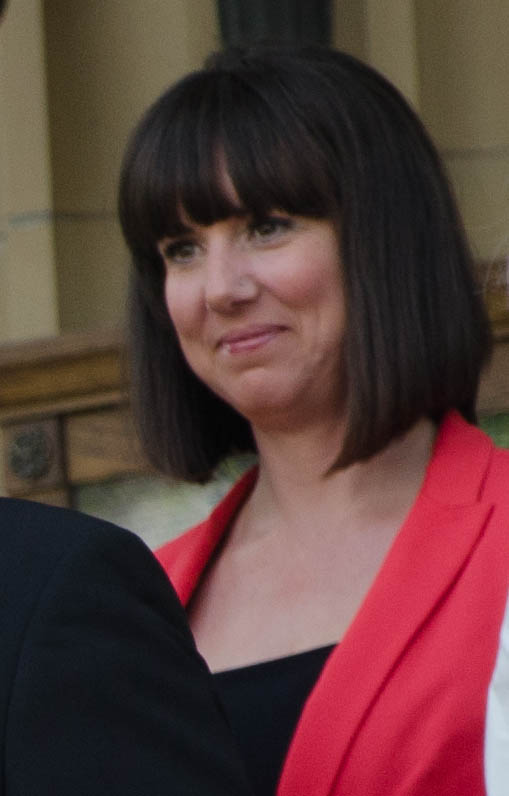

Member of the Legislative Assembly of Alberta for Edmonton-Castle Downs
- Incumbent
- Assumed office May 24, 2015
- Preceded by: Thomas Lukaszuk

Personal details
- Party: Alberta New Democratic Party
- Education: MacEwan University
- Occupation: Social worker

Nicole Goehring is a Canadian politician representing the constituency of Edmonton-Castle Downs in the Legislative Assembly of Alberta.

== Political career ==
She was appointed to the role of Government of Alberta's Liaison to the Canadian Armed Forces shortly after being sworn in on May 24, 2015. Goehring was responsible for developing, supporting, promoting and sustaining government's relationship with the Canadian Armed Forces.

Goehring was also appointed to the Edmonton Salutes Committee. This committee works collaboratively to support the military community in and around Edmonton.

In the 29th Legislature (2015-2019) she served as chair of the Standing Committee on Families and Communities and of the Standing Committee on Resource Stewardship, and as a member of the Standing Committee on Privileges and Elections and the Standing Orders and Printing, the Special Standing Committee on Members’ Services, the Standing Committee on Public Accounts and the Standing Committee on Families and Communities.

Following her re-election in 2019 she was appointed by Rachel Notley as the Official Opposition critic for Culture and Military Liaison. As of June 21, 2024, she serves as the Official Opposition critic for Veterans Affairs as well as the caucus' military liaison.

In the 30th Legislature, she serves as the deputy chair of the Standing Committee on Alberta's Economic Future, and as a member of the Special Standing Committee on Members' Services, the Select Special Child and Youth Advocate Search Committee, and the Select Special Ombudsman and Public Interest Commissioner Search Committee.

== Personal life ==
Before serving with the Legislative Assembly, Goehring worked with Child and Family Services in various capacities, including most recently as a court coordinator. Previous to this, she worked with Edmonton Integrated Services.

She has worked as a youth mediator with Community and Family Services helping to co-create and implement a youth-friendly mediation manual and program.

An active parent, she has managed sports teams, has worked on parent advisory committees and has acted as a parent liaison.

== Electoral record ==
=== 2023 general election ===
2023 Alberta general election: Edmonton-Castle Downs
Party	Candidate	Votes	%	±%
New Democratic	Nicole Goehring	10,044	55.69	+9.99
United Conservative	Jon Dziadyk	7,286	40.39	+4.46
Alberta Party	Patrick Stewart	707	3.92	-11.62
Total		18,037	99.26	–
Rejected and declined		135	0.74	
Turnout		18,172	53.57	
Eligible voters		33,921		
New Democratic hold		Swing		+2.77
Source(s) Source: Elections Alberta

=== 2019 general election ===
2019 Alberta general election: Edmonton-Castle Downs
Party	Candidate	Votes	%	±%
New Democratic	Nicole Goehring	9,445	45.69%	-18.77%
United Conservative	Ed Ammar	7,428	35.93%	5.24%
Alberta Party	Moe Rahall	3,213	15.54%	–
Alberta Independence	Todd Wayne	294	1.42%	–
Liberal	Thomas Deak	291	1.41%	-3.44%
Total		20,671	–	–
Rejected, spoiled and declined		107	60	14
Eligible electors / turnout		31,953	65.26%	14.19%
New Democratic hold		Swing		-15.82%
Source(s) Source: "28 - Edmonton-Castle Downs, 2019 Alberta general election". officialresults.elections.ab.ca. Elections Alberta. Alberta. Chief Electoral Officer (2019). 2019 General Election. A Report of the Chief Electoral Officer. Volume II (PDF) (Report). Vol. 2. Edmonton, Alta.: Elections Alberta. pp. 108–111. ISBN 978-1-988620-12-1.

=== 2015 general election ===
2015 Alberta general election: Edmonton-Castle Downs
Party	Candidate	Votes	%	±%
New Democratic	Nicole Goehring	11,689	64.46%	51.83%
Progressive Conservative	Thomas Lukaszuk	4,182	23.06%	-29.54%
Wildrose	Gerrit Roosenboom	1,383	7.63%	-13.89%
Liberal	Todd Ross	880	4.85%	-6.69%
Total		18,134	–	–
Rejected, spoiled and declined		69	–	–
Eligible electors / turnout		35,641	51.07%	1.17%
New Democratic gain from Progressive Conservative		Swing		5.16%
Source(s) Source: "30 - Edmonton-Castle Downs, 2015 Alberta general election". officialresults.elections.ab.ca. Elections Alberta.
