= 2024 Alberta New Democratic Party leadership election =

- June 22, 2024
- Turnout: 85.6%
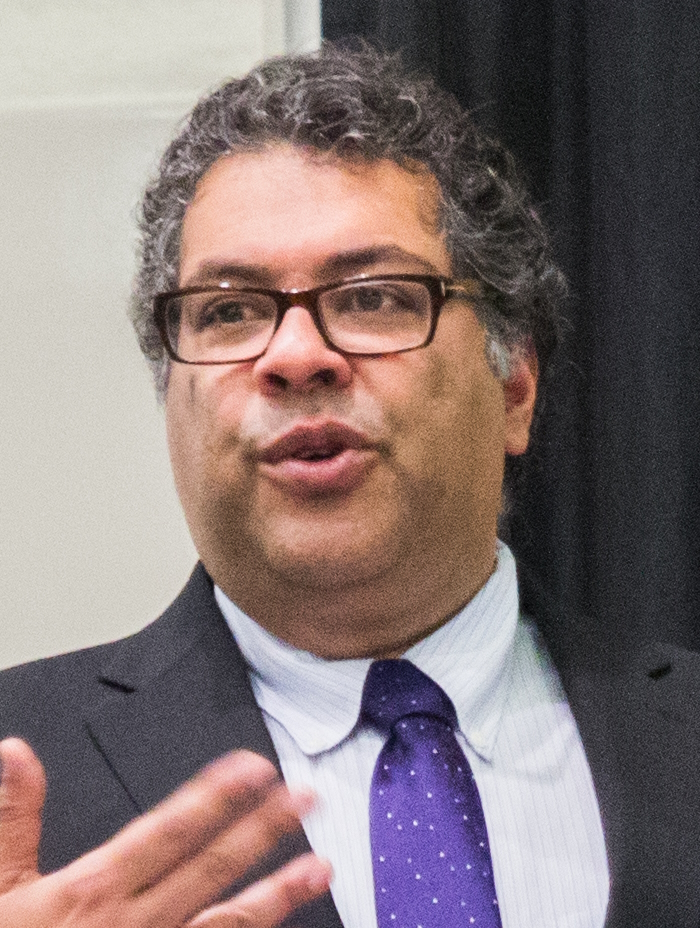

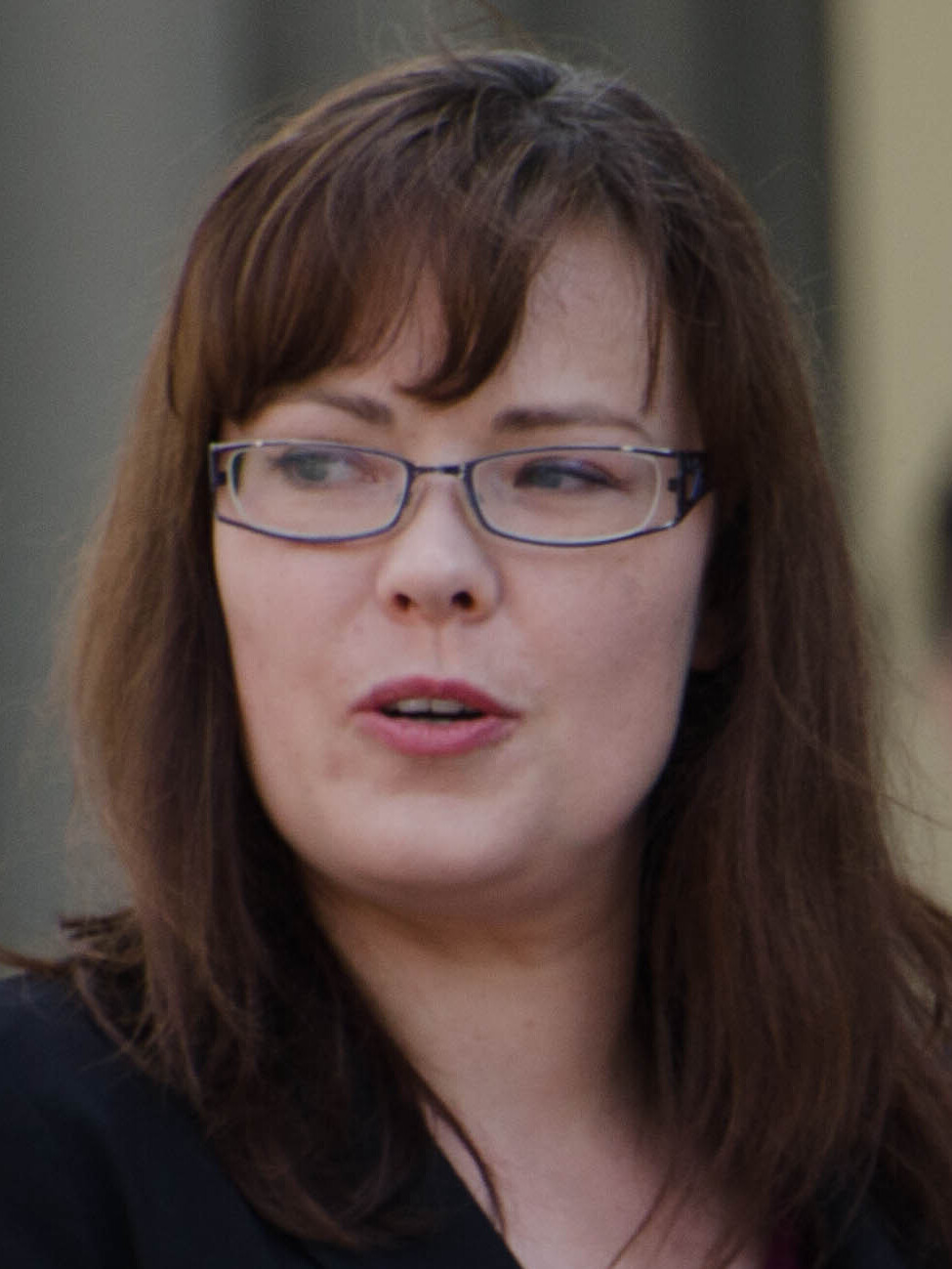
Candidate	Naheed Nenshi	Kathleen Ganley
Popular vote	62,746	5,899
Percentage	86.04%	8.09%
Leader before election
Rachel Notley
Elected Leader
Naheed Nenshi

2024 Alberta New Democratic Party leadership election
- Date: June 22, 2024
- Convention: Hyatt Regency, Calgary
- Resigning leader: Rachel Notley
- Won by: Naheed Nenshi
- Ballots: 1
- Candidates: 4
- Entrance fee: $60,000
- Spending limit: $500,000

On June 22, 2024, members of the Alberta New Democratic Party voted on a successor for Rachel Notley after she announced her intent to resign as the party leader, after a decade in the position, as soon as her successor is chosen. Notley served as Premier of Alberta from 2015 to 2019 and was Leader of the Opposition at the time of her announcement, which was made almost eight months after the NDP lost the May 2023 Alberta general election.

Naheed Nenshi won the leadership election on the first ballot with 86% support and 62,746 votes, which the Alberta NDP claims is the most individual votes cast for a leadership candidate in any provincial party leadership race in Canadian history.

== Rules ==
Unlike the 2014 Alberta New Democratic Party leadership election in which a weighted voting system was used giving unions and affiliated organizations up to 20 per cent of the vote, the 2024 election allocated 100 per cent of the vote to individual party members. Ranked ballots were used; as well as the Instant-runoff voting system to determine the winner. Voting was conducted online, by telephone, and by mail.

To qualify to be on the ballot a candidate must: be approved by the Leadership Race Approvals Committee, complete a registration and disclosure form along with a $1,500 research fee, submit three separate registrations fees by their respective deadlines (see Timeline), and submit the signatures of a minimum of 50 nominators who are members in good standing. Candidates must secure 10 nominations from residents in each of the following regions: Edmonton constituencies, Northern Alberta constituencies, Central Alberta constituencies, Calgary constituencies, and Southern Alberta constituencies. At least one nominator from each region must self-identify as a woman, and at least one must self-identify as equity seeking. At least 25 nominators overall must identify as women, and at least 20 nominators overall must identify as members belonging to equity seeking groups which include persons of colour, Indigenous, living with a disability, youth, and 2SLGBTQ+.

== Timeline ==
- January 16, 2024 - Rachel Notley announced her intention to resign as leader once her successor is chosen at a leadership election.
- January 27, 2024 - The party's provincial council met in Red Deer to decide on the rules and timeline for the leadership vote.
- February 5, 2024 - Leadership race begun.
- February 5, 2024 - Kathleen Ganley announced her candidacy.
- February 7, 2024 - David Shepherd registered his candidacy with Elections Alberta, but does not announce his candidacy.
- February 8, 2024 - Rakhi Pancholi announced her candidacy.
- February 9, 2024 - David Shepherd announced he would not seek leadership due to health concerns, and withdraws his candidacy from Elections Alberta.
- February 11, 2024 - Sarah Hoffman announced her candidacy.
- February 24, 2024 - Jodi Calahoo Stonehouse announced her candidacy.
- February 26, 2024 - Gil McGowan announced his intention to seek candidacy.
- March 11, 2024 - Former Calgary mayor Naheed Nenshi announced his candidacy.
- March 15, 2024 - Candidate registration deadline, $18,500 nomination fee due.
- March 26, 2024 - Pancholi withdrew from the leadership race, and endorsed Nenshi.
- April 22, 2024 - Membership deadline for voting eligibility, $20,000 entrance fee due.
- April 25, 2024 - The first official leadership debate was held, at the Yates Memorial Theatre in Lethbridge.
- May 11, 2024 - The second official leadership debate is held, at the BMO Centre in Calgary.
- May 12, 2024 - Balloting deadline, $20,000 balloting fee due.
- May 13, 2024 - Gil McGowan withdraws.
- May 22, 2024 - Voting period begins.
- June 2, 2024 - The third and final official leadership debate is held, at the Edmonton Convention Centre in Edmonton.
- June 22, 2024 - Deadline to vote at 12:00 PM. Leadership race ends.

== Debates ==
Debates among candidates for the 2024 Alberta New Democratic Party leadership election
No.	Date	Place	Host	Participants — P Participant N Not invited A Absent invitee O Out of race (withdrawn or disqualified)					References
No.	Date	Place	Host	Stonehouse	Ganley	Hoffman	McGowan	Nenshi	References
1	April 25, 2024	Lethbridge	Alberta NDP	P	P	P	P	P	
2	May 11, 2024	Calgary	Alberta NDP	P	P	P	P	P	
3	June 2, 2024	Edmonton	Alberta NDP	P	P	P	O	P	

== Candidates ==
=== Approved ===
==== Jodi Calahoo Stonehouse ====
Background

Jodi Calahoo Stonehouse is the MLA for Edmonton-Rutherford (2023–present). She identifies as Mohawk and Cree from the Michel First Nation.

Date candidacy declared: February 24, 2024
Date candidacy registered with Elections Alberta: February 22, 2024
Date candidacy approved: February 23, 2024
Campaign website: voteforjodi.ca
Campaign slogan: Stronger Together

Policies

Calahoo Stonehouse has proposed environmental policies including an "Albertans Right to Water Act," creating a council of youth and elders to advise on rights of nature, and investing in water technologies centre at the University of Lethbridge. Calahoo Stonehouse also proposed the "Alberta Royalty Dividend" policy, when the price of oil goes above C$70 per barrel, a share of royalty payments which the Alberta Government collects would go directly to Albertans. Calahoo Stonehouse's education policy includes curriculum reform including implementing history of Treaties and the Residential School system, stopping the scheduling of exams on significant days of observance, improving resources and funding for school boards, and ending the historic rates of death of children in the care of Alberta Children's Services. Calahoo Stonehouse also committed to labour rights, opposing undermining collective agreements, and repealing the Restoring Balance in Alberta's Workplaces Act, 2020.

Endorsements of Jodi Calahoo Stonehouse

MLAs: (2)

- Brooks Arcand-Paul, MLA for Edmonton-West Henday (2023–present)
- Sarah Elmeligi, MLA for Banff-Kananaskis (2023–present)

Former MLAs: (1)

- Richard Feehan, MLA for Edmonton-Rutherford (2015–2023)

==== Kathleen Ganley ====
Background

Katheen Ganley, is the MLA for Calgary-Mountain View (2019–present) and former MLA for Calgary-Buffalo (2015–2019). She previously served as Minister of Justice and Solicitor General (2015–2019) and Minister of Aboriginal Affairs (2015–2016).

Date candidacy declared: February 5, 2024
Date candidacy registered with Elections Alberta: February 5, 2024
Date candidacy approved: February 6, 2024
Campaign website: teamganley.ca/
Campaign slogan: Work Together, Win Together

Policies

Ganley proposed immediately raising the minimum wage to $16 per hour, and to $17 per hour in 2025. She also committed to increasing the basic income tax exemption to $26,000, but higher earners would not receive the benefit.

Endorsements of Kathleen Ganley

MLAs: (8)

- Gurinder Brar, MLA for Calgary-North East (2023–present)
- Amanda Chapman, MLA for Calgary-Beddington (2023–present)
- Jasvir Deol, MLA for Edmonton-Meadows (2019–present)
- Sharif Haji, MLA for Edmonton-Decore (2023–present)
- Julia Hayter, MLA for Calgary-Edgemont (2023–present)
- Shannon Phillips, MLA for Lethbridge-West (2015–2024)
- Irfan Sabir, MLA for Calgary-Bhullar-McCall (2015–present)
- Heather Sweet, MLA for Edmonton-Manning (2015–present)

Former MLAs: (8)

- Shaye Anderson, MLA for Leduc-Beaumont (2015–2019)
- Oneil Carlier, MLA for Whitecourt-Ste. Anne (2015–2019)
- Craig Coolahan, MLA for Calgary-Klein (2015–2019)
- Harry B. Chase, Liberal MLA for Calgary-Varsity (2004–2012)
- Danielle Larivee, MLA for Lesser Slave Lake (2015–2019)
- Brian Mason, MLA for Edmonton-Highlands (2000–2004), MLA for Edmonton-Highlands-Norwood (2004–2019), former Leader of the Alberta NDP (2004–2014)
- Ricardo Miranda, MLA for Calgary-Cross (2015–2019)
- Raj Pannu, MLA for Edmonton-Strathcona (1997–2008) and former Leader of the Alberta NDP (2000–2004)

Other prominent individuals: (1)

- Philip Bryden, law professor, and former Deputy Minister of Justice and Deputy Solicitor General of Alberta

==== Sarah Hoffman ====
Background

Sarah Hoffman, is the MLA for Edmonton-Glenora (2015–present). She previously served as Deputy Premier of Alberta (2016–2019), Minister of Health (2015–2019), Edmonton Public School Trustee (2010–2015), and Edmonton Public School Board of Trustees Chair (2012–2015).

Date candidacy declared: February 11, 2024
Date candidacy registered with Elections Alberta: February 5, 2024
Date candidacy approved: February 6, 2024
Campaign website: sarahhoffman.ca
Campaign slogan: Health. Climate. Housing.

Policies

Hoffman said she supports rent control and short term rent caps with increased housing supply.

Endorsements of Sarah Hoffman

MLAs: (5)

- Nathan Ip, MLA for Edmonton-South West (2023–present), Edmonton Public School Board Trustee (2013–2023)
- Luanne Metz, MLA for Calgary-Varsity
- Marlin Schmidt, MLA for Edmonton-Gold Bar (2015–present)
- Lori Sigurdson, MLA for Edmonton-Riverview (2015–present)
- Peggy Wright, MLA for Edmonton-Beverly-Clareview (2023–present)

Former MLAs: (7)

- Barrie Chivers, MLA for Edmonton-Strathcona (1990–1993)
- Anam Kazim, MLA for Calgary-Glenmore (2015–2019)
- Ray Martin, MLA for Edmonton-Norwood (1982–1993), MLA for Edmonton-Beverly-Clareview (2004–2008), former Leader of the Alberta NDP (1984–1994), Edmonton Public School Board Trustee (2013–2017)
- Alex McEachern, MLA for Edmonton-Kingsway (1986–1993)
- Kim Schreiner, MLA for Red Deer-North (2015–2019)
- Graham Sucha, MLA for Calgary-Shaw (2015–2019)
- Bob Wanner, MLA for Medicine Hat (2015–2019)

MPs: (1)

- Heather McPherson, MP for Edmonton Strathcona (2019–present)

Former MPs: (1)

- Linda Duncan, MP for Edmonton Strathcona (2008–2019)

==== Naheed Nenshi ====
Background

Naheed Nenshi is a former Mayor of Calgary (2010–2021). Before entering politics, Nenshi taught non-profit management in the Bissett School of Business at Mount Royal University and wrote a regular municipal affairs column for the Calgary Herald.

Date candidacy declared: March 11, 2024
Date candidacy registered with Elections Alberta: March 11, 2024
Date candidacy approved: March 11, 2024
Campaign website: nenshi.ca
Campaign slogan: For all of us.

Endorsements of Naheed Nenshi

MLAs: (9)

- Nagwan Al-Guneid, MLA for Calgary-Glenmore (2023–present)
- Court Ellingson, MLA for Calgary-Foothills (2023–present)
- Rhiannon Hoyle, MLA for Edmonton-South (2023–present)
- Samir Kayande, MLA for Calgary-Elbow (2023–present)
- Rod Loyola, MLA for Edmonton-Ellerslie (2015–2025)
- Rakhi Pancholi, MLA for Edmonton-Whitemud (2019–present), former candidate for leader of the Alberta NDP
- Marie Renaud, MLA for St. Albert (2015–present)
- David Shepherd, MLA for Edmonton-City Centre (2019–present), MLA for Edmonton-Centre (2015-2019)
- Parmeet Singh Boparai, MLA for Calgary-Falconridge (2023–present)

Former MLAs: (3)

- Michael Connolly, MLA for Calgary-Hawkwood (2015–2019)
- Maria Fitzpatrick, MLA for Lethbridge-East (2015–2019)
- Cam Westhead, MLA for Banff-Kananaskis (2015–2019)

Former municipal politicians: (2)

- Diane Colley-Urquhart, Calgary City Councillor for Ward 13 (2000–2021)
- Druh Farrell, Calgary City Councillor for Ward 7 (2001–2021)

Other prominent individuals: (2)

- Jann Arden, singer-songwriter, author and actress
- Andrew Phung, actor, improviser, and comedian

=== Withdrew or failed to qualify ===
==== Gil McGowan ====
Background

Gil McGowan is president of the Alberta Federation of Labour (2005–present). During the 2015 federal election, McGowan ran in Edmonton Centre for the federal NDP. On May 13, 2024, McGowan announced he would be withdrawing his candidacy due to being unable to pay the last instalment of the leadership race fees, which had been due on May 12, 2024.

Date candidacy declared: February 26, 2024
Date candidacy registered with Elections Alberta: March 7, 2024
Date candidacy approved: March 7, 2024
Date withdrew: May 13, 2024
Campaign website: gilforalberta.ca
Campaign slogan: Building a winning coalition

Policies

McGowan had released five "big ideas" out of seven. The first focused on energy transition through Lougheed-inspired industrial policy and made reference to the Alberta Federation of Labour's Skate to Where the Puck is Going report. The second focused on addressing wage growth in Alberta by pursuing policies to target productivity like industrial policy and direct government investment, by encouraging tight labor markets, and by pursuing pro-union policies. The third focused on affordability by, among other things, introducing rent controls, public auto insurance, and an excess profit penalty. The fourth called for a strengthening of public healthcare and addressing the staffing crisis in healthcare and specifically primary care, and the fifth was to defend public education through funding increases, reducing class sizes, and improving staff wages.

Endorsements of Gil McGowan

Other prominent organizations: (1)

- Alberta Federation of Labour

==== Rakhi Pancholi ====
Background

Rakhi Pancholi is the MLA for Edmonton-Whitemud (2019–present). On March 26, 2024, Pancholi announced she would no longer be pursuing the leadership, and endorsed Naheed Nenshi.

Date candidacy declared: February 8, 2024
Date candidacy registered with Elections Alberta: February 7, 2024
Date candidacy approved: February 7, 2024
Date withdrew: March 26, 2024
Campaign website: voterakhi.ca/
Campaign slogan: Rakhi for Alberta

Endorsements of Rakhi Pancholi

MLAs: (3)

- Nagwan Al-Guneid, MLA for Calgary-Glenmore (2023–present)
- Rhiannon Hoyle, MLA for Edmonton-South (2023–present)
- Marie Renaud, MLA for St. Albert (2015–present)

==== David Shepherd ====
Background

David Shepherd is the MLA for Edmonton-City Centre (2019–present), formerly MLA for Edmonton-Centre (2015–2019). On February 9, 2024, Shepherd announced he would no longer be pursuing the leadership due to ongoing health challenges. Though Shepherd had registered his leadership campaign with Elections Alberta, Shepherd withdrew before he made a public declaration of candidacy. On April 3, 2024, Shepherd announced he was endorsing Naheed Nenshi.

Date candidacy declared: January 29, 2024 (to Elections Alberta)
Date candidacy registered with Elections Alberta: February 7, 2024
Date candidacy approved: February 7, 2024
Date withdrew: February 9, 2024

=== Declined ===
- Deron Bilous, MLA for Edmonton-Beverly-Clareview (2012–2023), former Minister of Economic Development
- Joe Ceci, MLA for Calgary-Buffalo (2015–present), former Minister of Finance
- Court Ellingson, MLA for Calgary-Foothills (2023–present) (endorsed Nenshi)
- Todd Hirsch, director of Energy Transition Centre at Innovate Calgary (2023–present), chief economist at ATB Financial (2007–2022)
- Rhiannon Hoyle, MLA for Edmonton-South (2023–present)
- Janis Irwin, MLA for Edmonton-Highlands-Norwood (2019–present)
- Samir Kayande, MLA for Calgary-Elbow, (2023–present) (endorsed Nenshi)
- Shannon Phillips, MLA for Lethbridge-West (2015–2024), former Minister of Environment and Parks (2015–2019) (endorsed Ganley)
- Irfan Sabir, MLA for Calgary-Bhullar-McCall (2015–present), former Minister of Community and Social Services (2015–2019) (endorsed Ganley)

== Results ==
First Round
Candidate
Candidate	Votes cast	%
Naheed Nenshi	62,746	86.04%
Kathleen Ganley	5,899	8.09%
Sarah Hoffman	3,063	4.19%
Jodi Calahoo Stonehouse	1,222	1.67%
Rejected Ballots		
Total	72,930	100.00

== See also ==
- Alberta New Democratic Party leadership elections
