= Alberta New Democratic Party leadership elections =

This page lists the results of leadership elections held by the Alberta New Democratic Party. The position of party leader was not officially created until the 1963 convention. From the Alberta NDP's formation in 1962 until 1963 the party president was Neil Reimer who served as de facto leader.

== 1963 leadership convention ==
(Held on January 27, 1963)

- Neil Reimer elected
- Ivor Dent

(Note: the vote totals do not appear to have been released. The race was said to be close.)

Former Alberta CCF leader Floyd Albin Johnson and high school teacher William McLean were also candidates but withdrew before balloting.

== 1968 leadership convention ==
(Held on November 10, 1968)

- Grant Notley 143
- G.S.D. Wright 113
- Alan Bush 22

Notley was killed in a plane crash on October 19, 1984. Ray Martin was chosen interim leader.

== 1984 leadership convention ==
(Held on November 10, 1984)

- Ray Martin acclaimed

== 1994 leadership convention ==
(Held on February 5, 1994)

- Ross Harvey 230
- Bruce Hinkley 69
- Laurence Johnson 58
- Clancy Teslenko 54

== 1995 leadership challenge ==
(Held on November 11, 1995)

- Ross Harvey 177
- Anne McGrath 118
- Joe Weykowich 30
- Lawrence Dubrofsky 3

== 1996 leadership convention ==
(Held on September 8, 1996)

- Pam Barrett 257
- Mimi Williams 52
- Joe Weykowich 49
- Archie Baldwin 0

Barrett resigned on February 2, 2000. Raj Pannu was chosen interim leader.

== 2000 leadership convention ==
(Held on November 5, 2000)

- Raj Pannu acclaimed

Pannu resigned on July 13, 2004. Brian Mason was chosen interim leader.

== 2004 leadership convention ==
(Held on September 18, 2004)

- Brian Mason acclaimed

== 2014 leadership convention ==
(Held in Edmonton October 18 to 19, 2014)

- Rachel Notley 70%
- David Eggen 28%
- Rod Loyola 2%

3,589 votes were cast.

On April 29, 2014, Brian Mason announced that he would resign as leader as soon as a leadership election would be held to choose his successor.

== 2024 leadership convention ==
(Online voting held between May 22 and June 22, 2024; results announced on June 22)

First Round
Candidate
Candidate	Votes cast	%
Naheed Nenshi	62,746	86.04%
Kathleen Ganley	5,899	8.09%
Sarah Hoffman	3,063	4.19%
Jodi Calahoo Stonehouse	1,222	1.67%
Rejected Ballots		
Total	72,930	100.00

This election was held after Rachel Notley announced her resignation as party leader. She remained leader until the leadership election was concluded.

== See also ==
- leadership convention
- Alberta New Democratic Party
