= 2014 Alberta New Democratic Party leadership election =

- October 18, 2014
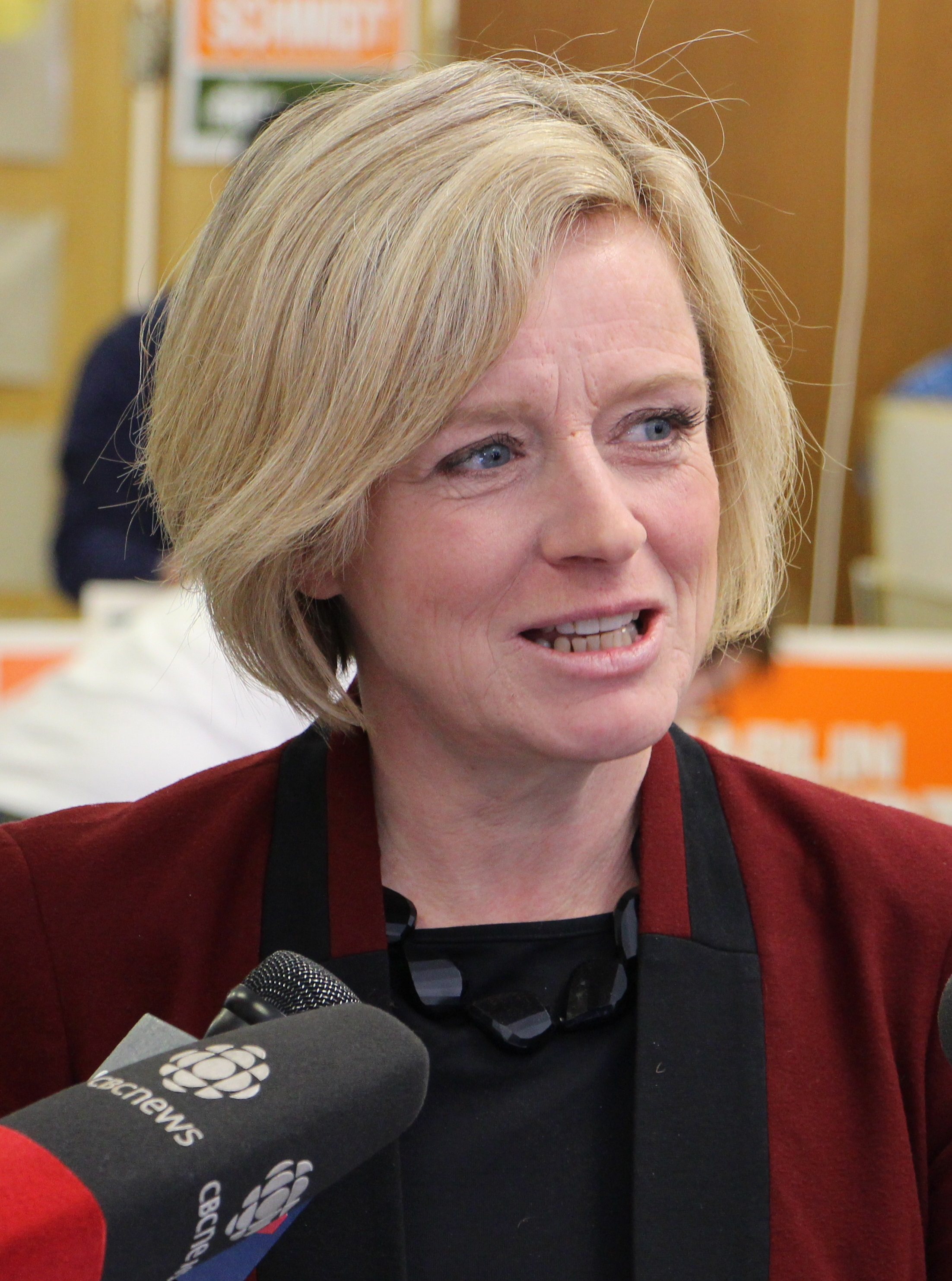

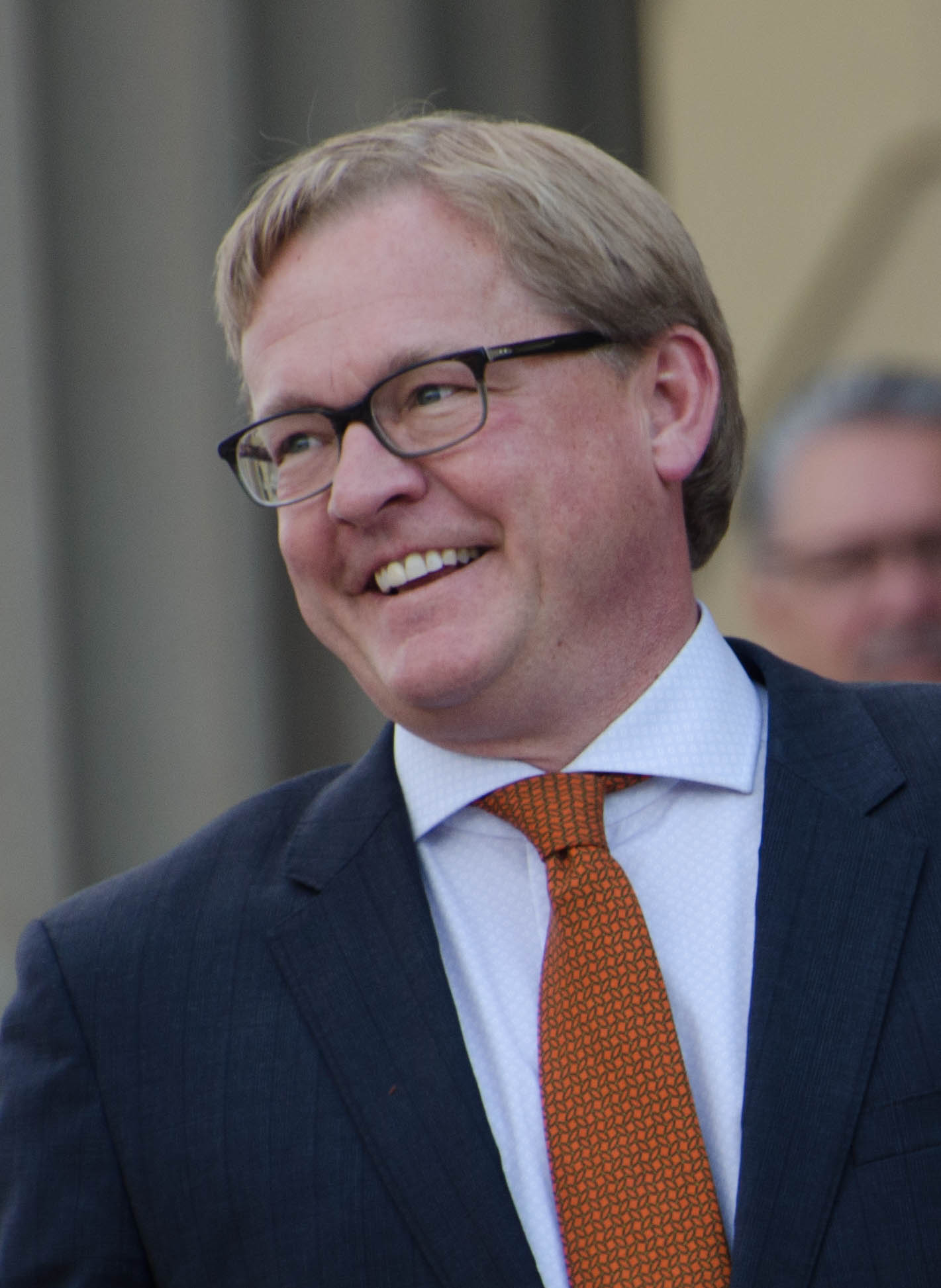
Candidate	Rachel Notley	David Eggen
Popular vote	2,512	1,005
Percentage	70.0%	28.0%
Leader before election
Brian Mason
Elected Leader
Rachel Notley

2014 Alberta New Democratic Party leadership election
- Date: October 18, 2014
- Convention: Edmonton
- Resigning leader: Brian Mason
- Won by: Rachel Notley
- Ballots: 1
- Candidates: 3
- Entrance fee: $5,000
- Spending limit: $100,000

The 2014 Alberta New Democratic Party leadership election was prompted by Brian Mason's announcement on April 29, 2014, that he was resigning as leader of the Alberta New Democratic Party after a decade in the position.

For the first time, rather than selecting the leader through a delegated convention, all NDP members were eligible to vote. A weighted voting system was used in which ballots cast by members were weighted to at least 80 per cent of the total, and votes from trade unions and other affiliated organizations were weighted at a maximum of 20 per cent. To be nominated, a candidate had to obtain 50 signatures from party members and make a non-refundable $5,000 deposit. Individuals could not donate more than $15,000 and contributions in excess of $100 were publicly reported. Candidates could not accept donations from publicly traded corporations with more than 100 employees.

== Timeline ==
- April 29, 2014 - Brian Mason announces his resignation as Alberta NDP leader to take effect at the party's fall convention scheduled for October 18 and 19, 2014.
- May 27, 2014 - The party's provincial council announces leadership campaign rules, nomination fees and spending limits.
- June 2, 2014 - Nomination period officially opens.
- August 5, 2014 - Nomination period officially closes.
- October 18, 2014 - Leadership election.

== Declared candidates ==
=== David Eggen ===
Background

MLA for Edmonton-Calder (2004–2008, 2012–present), served as executive director of Alberta Friends of Medicare (2008–2012). Has served as NDP critic for Agriculture and Food, Environment, K–12 Education, Sustainable Resource Development, and Tourism and Culture. Former teacher.

Date candidacy declared: May 24, 2014
Date officially nominated: June 13, 2014
Supporters
Support from caucus members:
Support from federal caucus members:
Support from former provincial caucus members:
Other prominent supporters: Rupinder Kaur, former Chief of Staff to the Alberta New Democrats; Shauna Mihalicz, Alberta NDP vice-president; Aileen Burke, 2014 Macleod Federal By-Election Candidate; Denny Holmwood, New Democratic Youth of Alberta Co-Chair 2008–2010, 2008 Strathcona NDP Candidate;
Policies:

=== Rod Loyola ===
Background

NDP candidate in Edmonton-Ellerslie (2012) receiving 16 per cent of the vote and the NDP's nominee in that riding for the next election. He works as academic programs co-ordinator at the University of Alberta and also president of the Non-Academic Staff Association (NASA) at the university. Loyola, 40, is also the chair of Public Interest Alberta's Post-Secondary Education task force, a spoken-word poet and executive board member Friends of Medicare and the Knottwood Community League, and founding member of the Mill Woods Artists Collective.

Date candidacy declared: July 21, 2014
Date officially nominated:
Supporters
Support from caucus members:
Support from federal caucus members:
Support from former provincial caucus members:
Other prominent supporters:
Policies:

=== Rachel Notley ===
Background

MLA for Edmonton-Strathcona, (2008–present), NDP House Leader and variously Critic for Enterprise & Advanced Education, Environment & Sustainable Resource Development, Justice & Solicitor General, and Human Services; labour lawyer, daughter of Alberta NDP leader Grant Notley (1969–1984).

Date candidacy declared: June 16, 2014
Date officially nominated:
Supporters
Support from caucus members: Deron Bilous (Edmonton-Beverly-Clareview)
Support from federal caucus members: Linda Duncan (Edmonton--Strathcona)
Support from former provincial caucus members: Barrie Chivers (Edmonton-Strathcona, 1990–1993); Jim Gurnett, (Spirit River-Fairview, 1985–1986); Bob Hawkesworth (Calgary-Mountain View, 1986–1993) and former Calgary city councillor
Other prominent supporters: Lori Sigurdson, NDP Candidate (Edmonton-Riverview, 2012); Mandy Melnyk, NDP candidate (Athabasca-Sturgeon-Redwater, 2012); Marlin Schmidt, NDP candidate (Edmonton Gold Bar, 2012); Sarah Hoffman, Edmonton Public School Trustee; Mark Sandilands, NDP federal and provincial candidate
Policies:

== Declined ==
- Deron Bilous, MLA for Edmonton-Beverly-Clareview, (2012–present), teacher. (Endorsed Notley)
- Larry Booi, former president Alberta Teachers' Association
- Mandy Melnyk, NDP candidate in Athabasca-Sturgeon-Redwater (2012), has endorsed Notley
- Gil McGowan, president of the Alberta Federation of Labour (2005–present).
- Bill Moore-Kilgannon, Public Interest Alberta

== Results ==
Candidate	Votes	Percentage
Rachel Notley	2,512	70.0
David Eggen	1,005	28.0
Rod Loyola	72	2.0
Total	3,589	100

== See also ==
- Alberta New Democratic Party leadership elections
