= Jodi Calahoo Stonehouse =

Canadian politician (born c. 1974)

Jodi Calahoo Stonehouse MLA
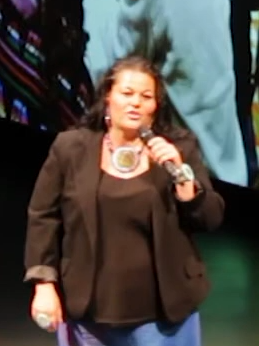

Member of the Legislative Assembly of Alberta for Edmonton-Rutherford
- Incumbent
- Assumed office May 29, 2023
- Preceded by: Richard Feehan

Personal details
- Born: 1974 or 1975 (age 51–52)
- Party: NDP
- Education: University of Alberta (BA)
- Website: jodistonehouse.ca

Jodi Calahoo Stonehouse (born 1974 or 1975) is a Canadian politician. She was elected in the 2023 Alberta general election to the Legislative Assembly of Alberta representing the electoral district of Edmonton-Rutherford, succeeding Richard Feehan. Stonehouse is a member of the Alberta New Democratic Party. She is the first First Nations woman to be elected to the Alberta Legislature, and second Indigenous woman, following Pearl Calahasen (Métis) elected in 1989.

In 2024, she was candidate for the post of leader of the Alberta NDP.

== Early life and education ==
Calahoo Stonehouse attended the University of Alberta where she earned a Bachelor of Arts from the Faculty of Native Studies, and was completing a master's degree in the Faculty of Resource Economics and Environmental Sociology.

== Adult life ==
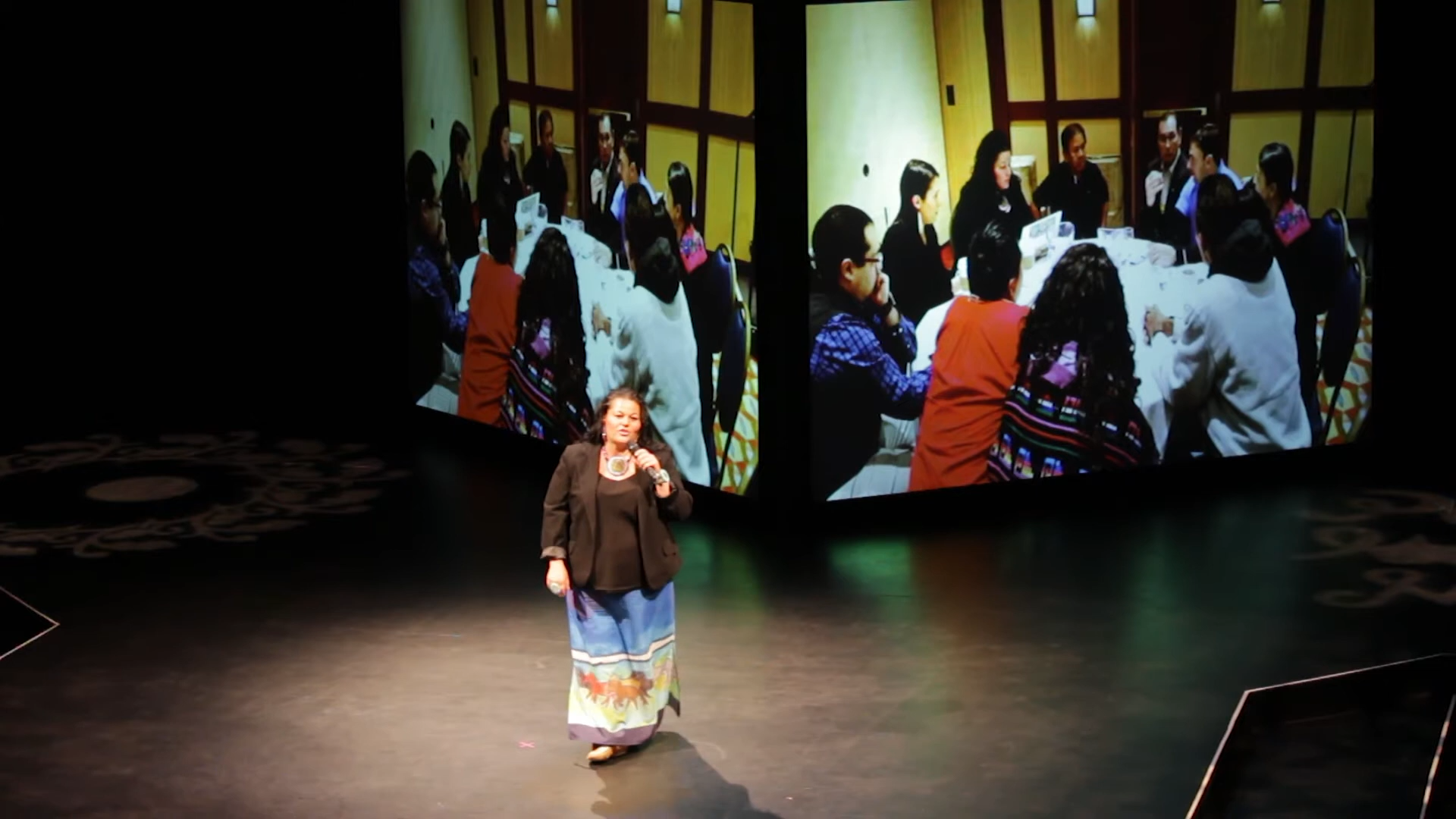
Stonehouse giving a talk in 2017

Stonehouse is Cree and Mohawk and a member of the Michel First Nation where she served on the band council. She has served as executive director of the Yellowhead Indigenous Education Foundation and as a member of the Edmonton Police Commission. In 2021, she campaigned for the position of national chief of the Assembly of First Nations after the retirement of Perry Bellegarde.

== Electoral history ==
=== 2023 Alberta general election ===
2023 Alberta general election: Edmonton-Rutherford
Party	Candidate	Votes	%	±%
New Democratic	Jodi Calahoo Stonehouse	13,012	65.05	+10.24
United Conservative	Laine Larson	6,366	31.83	-3.07
Green	Jordan Wilkie	624	3.12	+2.26
Total		20,002	99.26	–
Rejected and declined		150	0.74	
Turnout		20,152	63.52	
Eligible voters		31,726		
New Democratic hold		Swing		+6.65
Source(s) Source: Elections Alberta
