= Richard Feehan =

Canadian politician

The Honourable Richard John Feehan ECA

Minister of Indigenous Relations of Alberta
- In office February 2, 2016 – April 30, 2019
- Preceded by: Kathleen Ganley
- Succeeded by: Rick Wilson

Member of the Legislative Assembly of Alberta for Edmonton-Rutherford
- In office May 5, 2015 – May 29, 2023
- Preceded by: Fred Horne
- Succeeded by: Jodi Calahoo Stonehouse

Personal details
- Born: February 11, 1960 (age 66) Edmonton, Alberta
- Party: Alberta New Democratic Party BC NDP
- Education: Wilfrid Laurier University University of Calgary University of Alberta
- Occupation: University instructor and social worker

Richard John Feehan (born February 11, 1960) is a Canadian politician. He was a member of the Legislative Assembly of Alberta (MLA), representing the electoral district of Edmonton-Rutherford from 2015 until 2023.

== Early life and career ==
Richard Feehan was born on February 11, 1960 to parents Bernie and Kathleen Feehan. His father was a Judge on the Court of Queen’s Bench of Alberta and his mother was chair of Grant MacEwan’s social work program for 30 years. Feehan has six siblings, and is married with three adult children.

Feehan graduated from the University of Alberta with a Bachelor of Arts in 1980, from the University of Calgary with a Bachelor of Social Work and from Wilfrid Laurier University with a Masters of Social Work in 1986.

Before entering politics, Feehan worked in a variety of roles, including as the program director of the Edmonton Social Planning Council and vice-president of Catholic Social Services in Edmonton. He taught in the Edmonton division of the University of Calgary’s faculty of social work for a decade, before being elected.

== Politics ==
Feehan ran for Edmonton City Council in the 2013 Edmonton municipal election in Ward 10, on a platform of local sustainability and infrastructure renewal. He placed second, losing to community organizer Michael Walters.

In the 2015 Alberta general election, Feehan was nominated as the Alberta New Democratic Party candidate for Edmonton-Rutherford. Feehan was elected as MLA, receiving 63.94% of the vote, a 55.62% increase in the NDP's share of the vote, which was the party's largest increase from the 2012 Alberta general election.

Following the election, Feehan was appointed Alberta NDP caucus chair by Premier Rachel Notley. Shortly after, he was elected Deputy Chairman of Committees in the 29th Alberta Legislature.

In 2016, Feehan was appointed to the Executive Council of Alberta as Minister of Indigenous Relations. During his time as Minister, he oversaw the investment of $35 million in Indigenous-led renewable energy projects, implemented supports for families of Missing and Murdered Indigenous Women, and participated in engagement sessions for survivors of the Sixties Scoop, culminating in the Albertan government's apology for its role. Feehan also instituted training on Indigenous history and culture for all Albertan public servants in June 2018.

Feehan was re-elected in the 2019 Alberta general election and was appointed as the Official Opposition's Indigenous relations critic.

In April 2022, Feehan announced he would not seek re-election in the 2023 Alberta general election.

== Electoral record ==
2019 Alberta general election: Edmonton-Rutherford
Party	Candidate	Votes	%	±%
New Democratic	Richard Feehan	12,154	54.81	-7.52
United Conservative	Hannah Presakarchuk	7,737	34.89	+1.83
Alberta Party	Aisha Rauf	1,600	7.22	+7.03
Liberal	Claire Wilde	375	1.69	-2.72
Green	Valerie Kennedy	191	0.86	–
Alberta Independence	Lionel Levoir	117	0.53	–
Total		22,174	99.50	–
Rejected, spoiled and declined		111	0.50	
Turnout		22,285	69.47	
Eligible electors		32,077		
New Democratic hold		Swing		-4.68
Source(s) Source: "41 - Edmonton-Rutherford, 2019 Alberta general election". officialresults.elections.ab.ca. Elections Alberta. Alberta. Chief Electoral Officer (2019). 2019 General Election. A Report of the Chief Electoral Officer. Volume II (PDF) (Report). Vol. 2. Edmonton, Alta.: Elections Alberta. pp. 160–163. ISBN 978-1-988620-12-1.

2015 Alberta general election: Edmonton-Rutherford
Party	Candidate	Votes	%	±%
New Democratic	Richard Feehan	11,214	63.94%	55.62%
Progressive Conservative	Chris Labossiere	3,940	22.46%	-19.73%
Wildrose	Josef Pisa	1,644	9.37%	-7.44%
Liberal	Michael Chan	741	4.22%	-17.77%
Total		17,539	–	–
Rejected, spoiled and declined		23	37	41
Eligible electors / turnout		29,253	60.18%	-0.79%
New Democratic gain from Progressive Conservative		Swing		10.64%
Source(s) Source: "43 - Edmonton-Rutherford, 2015 Alberta general election". officialresults.elections.ab.ca. Elections Alberta. Chief Electoral Officer (2016). 2015 General Election. A Report of the Chief Electoral Officer (PDF) (Report). Edmonton, Alta.: Elections Alberta.

Ward 10: 2013 Edmonton municipal election
Candidate	Votes	%
Michael Walters	11,807	63.9
Richard John Feehan	3,818	20.7
Hafis Devji	1,509	8.2
Dan 'Can Man Dan' Johnstone	907	4.9
Ray Bessel	444	2.4
