= Kathleen Ganley =

Canadian politician (born 1970s)

The Honourable Kathleen Ganley ECA MLA
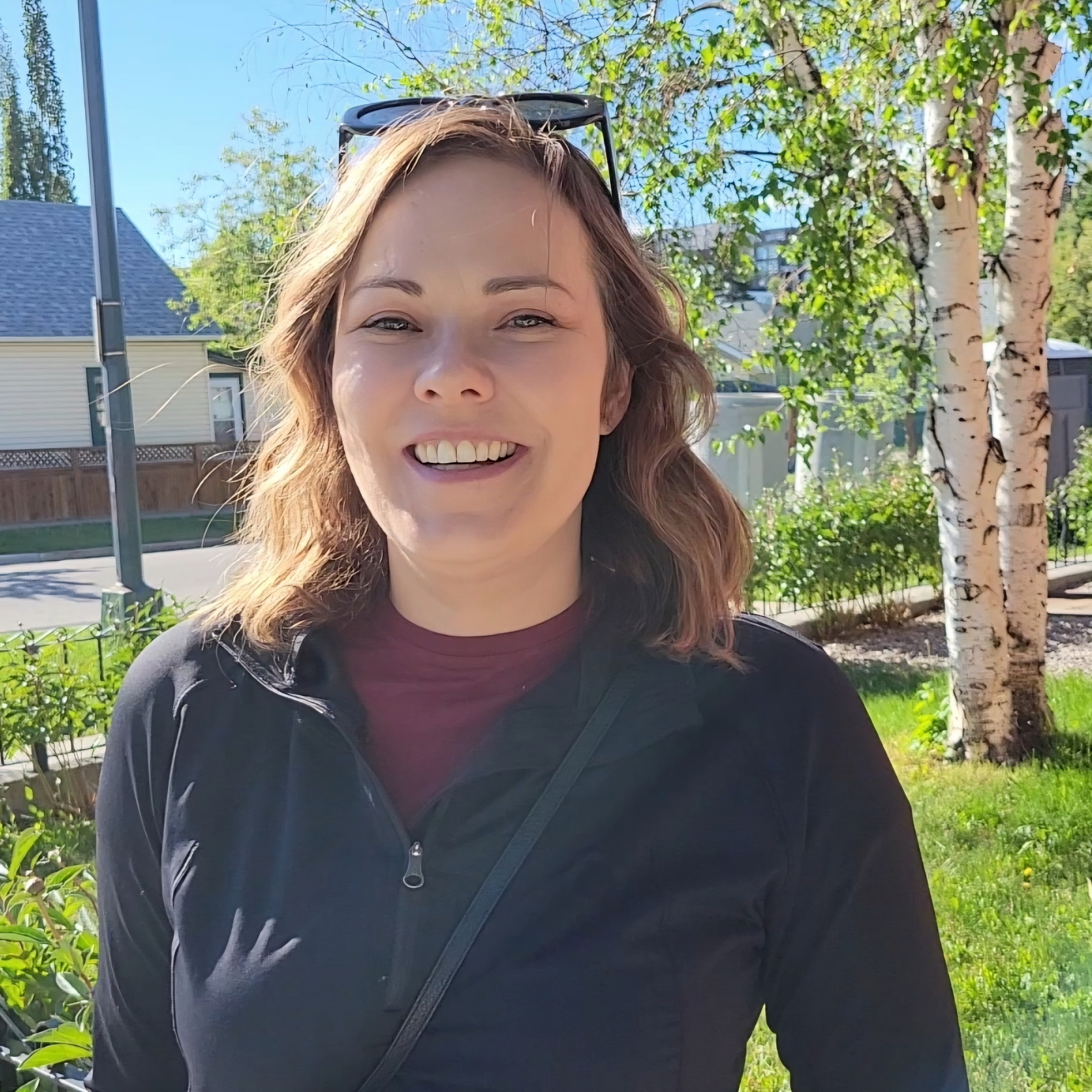
- Ganley in June 2024

Minister of Justice and Solicitor General of Alberta
- In office May 24, 2015 – April 30, 2019
- Premier: Rachel Notley
- Preceded by: Jonathan Denis
- Succeeded by: Doug Schweitzer

Member of the Legislative Assembly of Alberta for Calgary-Mountain View
- Incumbent
- Assumed office April 16, 2019
- Preceded by: David Swann

Member of the Legislative Assembly of Alberta for Calgary-Buffalo
- In office May 5, 2015 – April 16, 2019
- Preceded by: Kent Hehr
- Succeeded by: Joe Ceci

Minister of Aboriginal Affairs
- In office May 24, 2015 – February 2, 2016
- Premier: Rachel Notley
- Preceded by: Jim Prentice
- Succeeded by: Richard Feehan

Personal details
- Born: 1976 or 1977 (age 49–50) Edmonton, Alberta
- Party: Alberta New Democratic Party
- Education: University of Calgary
- Occupation: Lawyer
- Portfolio: Minister of Justice and Solicitor General

Kathleen Teresa Ganley ECA (born 1978) is a Canadian lawyer and politician who was elected in the 2019 Alberta general election to represent the electoral district of Calgary-Mountain View in the 30th Alberta Legislature. She was previously elected in 2015 to represent Calgary-Buffalo in the 29th Legislature. She is a member of the New Democratic Party of Alberta. On May 24, 2015 she was sworn in as the Minister of Justice and Minister of Aboriginal Affairs for the province of Alberta. On February 2, 2016 six new members were sworn into Alberta's Cabinet, and Kathleen Ganley retained the role of Minister of Justice and Solicitor General for the province of Alberta becoming one of the first non-conservatives to be appointed since the early 1960s. The department of Aboriginal Relations was renamed to Indigenous Relations, reflecting the preference of Indigenous communities, with Richard Feehan appointed Minister of Indigenous Relations.

In 2024, she ran for the position of leader of the Alberta NDP, ultimately losing out to former Mayor of Calgary Naheed Nenshi after receiving 5,899 votes or about 8% of the vote.

== Life and career ==
Ganley was born in Edmonton and moved to Calgary before she turned two. She has degrees in Psychology and in Philosophy from the University of Calgary. She graduated from the University of Calgary faculty of law in 2012. As a lawyer, she specialized in labour and employment. She also worked as a clerk in a provincial court. Ganley gave birth to her first child, a daughter named Wren, in November 2017.

== Electoral history ==
=== 2015 general election ===
2015 Alberta general election: Calgary-Buffalo
Party	Candidate	Votes	%	±%	Expenditures
New Democratic	Kathleen T. Ganley	4,671	35.11%	30.39%	$3,118
Progressive Conservative	Terry Rock	3,738	28.09%	-2.58%	$92,068
Liberal	David Khan	3,282	24.67%	-16.80%	$54,749
Wildrose	Leah Wamboldt	1,351	10.15%	-10.97%	$2,900
Green	Sabrina Lee Levac	263	1.98%	–	$500
Total		13,305	–	–	–
Rejected, spoiled and declined		162	–	–	–
Eligible electors / turnout		32,950	40.87%	-3.39%	–
New Democratic gain from Liberal		Swing		-1.89%	
Source(s) Source: "05 - Calgary-Buffalo, 2015 Alberta general election". officialresults.elections.ab.ca. Elections Alberta. "2015-2016 Annual Report of the Chief Electoral Officer" (PDF). Elections Alberta.

=== 2019 general election ===
2019 Alberta general election: Calgary-Mountain View
Party	Candidate	Votes	%	±%
New Democratic	Kathleen Ganley	12,526	47.32%	18.45%
United Conservative	Jeremy Wong	9,708	36.68%	2.24%
Alberta Party	Angela Kokott	2,345	8.86%	–
Liberal	David Khan	1,474	5.57%	-31.10%
Green	Thana Boonlert	315	1.19%	–
Alberta Independence	Monica Friesz	102	0.39%	–
Total		26,470	–	–
Rejected, spoiled and declined		203	86	7
Eligible electors / turnout		38,316	69.63%	15.24%
New Democratic gain from Liberal		Swing		1.43%
Source(s) Source: "18 - Calgary-Mountain View, 2019 Alberta general election". officialresults.elections.ab.ca. Elections Alberta.

=== 2023 general election ===
2023 Alberta general election: Calgary-Mountain View
Party	Candidate	Votes	%	±%
New Democratic	Kathleen Ganley	16,516	64.70	+17.38
United Conservative	Pamela Rath	8,468	33.17	-3.50
Liberal	Frances Woytkiw	335	1.31	-4.26
Solidarity Movement	Christopher Wedick	119	0.47	–
Pro-Life	Lucas Hernandez	90	0.35	–
Total		25,528	99.03	–
Rejected and declined		251	0.97	
Turnout		25,779	65.42	
Eligible voters		39,403		
New Democratic hold		Swing		+10.44
Source(s) Source: Elections Alberta
