= New Democratic Youth of Alberta =

- Abbreviation: NDYA
- Type: Political Organization
- Purpose: Advocating for youth in the Alberta NDP
- Headquarters: Edmonton, Alberta
- Location: Alberta, Canada
- Region served: Canada
- Official language: English
- Co-Chairs: Loveleen Kaur Sidhu, and Olga María Barceló
- Parent organization: Alberta NDP
- Affiliations: New Democratic Youth of Canada
- Website: https://www.facebook.com/NDYAlberta/

The New Democratic Youth of Alberta (NDYA) is the official youth branch of Alberta's NDP, and they act as a youth advocacy group within the centre-left party. Any party member between the age of 14 and 30 is automatically considered a member of the New Democratic Youth of Alberta (NDYA).

They feel that "issues of working-class empowerment, gender equality, environmental sustainability, and the tolerance of sexual preference, as well as other struggles for social justice, provide the necessary foundation for the formation of a better, more humane, society."

== 2018 Executive ==
The current executive is currently made up of 13 youth from across the province:

The organization's executive serves one-year terms, with a review of the executive every year at either the Alberta NDP's provincial council, provincial convention, or at the NDYA yearly convention.

Navneet Gidda - Co-Chair

Henry Dawson Wearmouth - Co-Chair

Noah Nicholls - Secretary

== 2019 Executive ==
Kate Pundyk- Co-Chair

Gurinder Brar - Co-Chair

Loveleen Kaur Sidhu - Secretary

Kelsey Fortier - Treasurer

== 2020 Executive ==
Loveleen Kaur Sidhu - Co-Chair

Olga María Barceló - Co-Chair

Leonard Zasiedko - Secretary

Kelsey Fortier - Treasurer

== 2022 Executive ==
Dolly Cepeda Montufar - Co-Chair

Leonard Zasiedko - Co-Chair

Laura Penner - Secretary

Kaidon Blake - Treasurer
