= Floyd Albin Johnson =

Canadian politician (1908–1974)

Leader of the Alberta Co-operative Commonwealth Federation
- In office June 29, 1957 – January 20, 1962
- Preceded by: Elmer Ernest Roper
- Succeeded by: Neil Reimer (NDP)

Personal details
- Born: 1908 South Dakota
- Died: 1974 (aged 65–66)
- Party: Alberta Co-operative Commonwealth Federation
- Other political affiliations: Co-operative Commonwealth Federation, New Democratic Party
- Spouse: Alice Andrews Johnson
- Children: Floyd Edison Johnson, Myrna Johnson Getty, Mark Johnson
- Profession: Carpenter, building contractor

Floyd Albin Johnson (1908–1974) was a Canadian politician who was the last leader of the Alberta Co-operative Commonwealth Federation from 1957 until 1962.

Johnson was born in South Dakota. He emigrated to Canada with his family when he was 12 and spent the rest of his youth on the family's homestead in Wetaskiwin, where he became involved with the United Farmers of Alberta. As an adult, he was a carpenter by trade and studied architecture, ultimately becoming a building contractor. In 1945, after being involved with construction projects in the north during World War II he co-founded and became president of Dicconson, Johnson and Company, a contracting firm specializing in building housing.

He succeeded Elmer Roper as leader of the Alberta CCF in 1957, and led the party into the 1959 provincial election, in which it lost its only two seats in the Alberta legislature. He remained leader until the founding of the CCF's successor, the Alberta New Democratic Party, in 1962. Johnson sought the leadership of the new party at its first leadership convention on January 27, 1963 but withdrew before balloting began; Neil Reimer was elected leader.

Johnson joined the Co-operative Commonwealth Federation at its founding in 1932 and stood for office in federal and provincial elections in the 1950s and in the 1960s for the CCF and its successor, the New Democratic Party of Canada. He was a candidate for the Alberta CCF in Edmonton in the 1952 and 1955 provincial elections and, as party leader, in Dunvegan in 1959 but was defeated in each attempt. He also ran unsuccessfully as a candidate in federal elections for the CCF in Edmonton—Strathcona in the 1953 and 1957 federal elections, and for the New Democratic Party of Canada in Acadia in the 1962 and 1963 federal elections. He also ran, unsuccessfully, for the Edmonton school board on the Better Education Association ticket in the 1961 civic election.
