= Philip Bryden =

Canadian lawyer and academic

Philip Bryden, BA (Dalhousie) 1975, BA (Jurisprudence) (Oxford) 1978, B.C.L. (Oxford) 1979, LL.M. (Harvard) 1985 is a lawyer, and Deputy Minister. The Government of Alberta confirmed an Order in Council appointing former Dean and Professor Phil Bryden as Deputy Minister of Justice and Deputy Solicitor General effective July 6, 2015. Before this appointment, he previously held the position of dean of law at the University of Alberta, and at the University of New Brunswick, each for five years.
