= Neil Reimer =

Canadian politician (1921–2011)

Leader of the Alberta New Democratic Party
- In office January 27, 1963 – November 10, 1968
- Preceded by: Floyd Albin Johnson (CCF)
- Succeeded by: Grant Notley

Personal details
- Born: July 3, 1921 Saskatchewan
- Died: March 29, 2011 (aged 89) Edmonton, Alberta
- Party: Alberta New Democratic Party
- Other political affiliations: New Democratic Party
- Children: Janice Rhea Reimer
- Profession: union organizer

Neil Reimer (July 3, 1921 – March 29, 2011) was an activist, trade unionist and politician in Canada.

Reimer attended the University of Saskatchewan, but left in 1942 at the age of 19 to work at the Consumers Co-operative Refinery in Regina, Saskatchewan. There he joined a Congress of Industrial Organizations union organizing drive. In 1950, he became an organizer for the CIO's Oil Workers International Union (OWIU) and was sent to Alberta to organize workers in that province's booming petrochemical industry.

In 1951, Reimer became the Canadian director of the OWIU (which subsequently became the Oil, Chemical & Atomic Workers Union) and served as the national director of the union and its successors until he retired in 1982. Under his stewardship, the union grew from fewer than 1,000 members to more than 20,000 by 1961. In 1981 the union gained independence from its American parent to become the Energy and Chemical Workers Union and, in 1992, merged with two other unions to become the Communications, Energy and Paperworkers Union of Canada.

Reimer was elected as a vice-president of the Canadian Congress of Labour in the 1950s and remained on the executive of it and its successor, the Canadian Labour Congress, until 1974.

At the 1962 founding convention of the Alberta New Democratic Party, Reimer was named party president. The following January, he was elected the first leader of the Alberta NDP. The NDP's predecessor, the Alberta CCF, had lost its remaining two seats in the 1959 provincial election and received only 4% of the vote. Under Reimer's leadership, the NDP's share of the popular vote rose to 9% in the 1963 election and to nearly 16% in the 1967 election, but did not win any seats. Reimer resigned as NDP leader in 1968.

Reimer remained Canadian director of the OCAW throughout the 1960s and 1970s and became national director of the Energy and Chemical Workers Union when it was formed from the OCAW in 1981. He retired from the union's leadership in 1984. He then served as the president and later as secretary treasurer of the Alberta Council on Aging.

His daughter, Janice Rhea Reimer, served as mayor of Edmonton from 1989 to 1995.
