= Raj Pannu =

Canadian educator and politician (1934–2025)

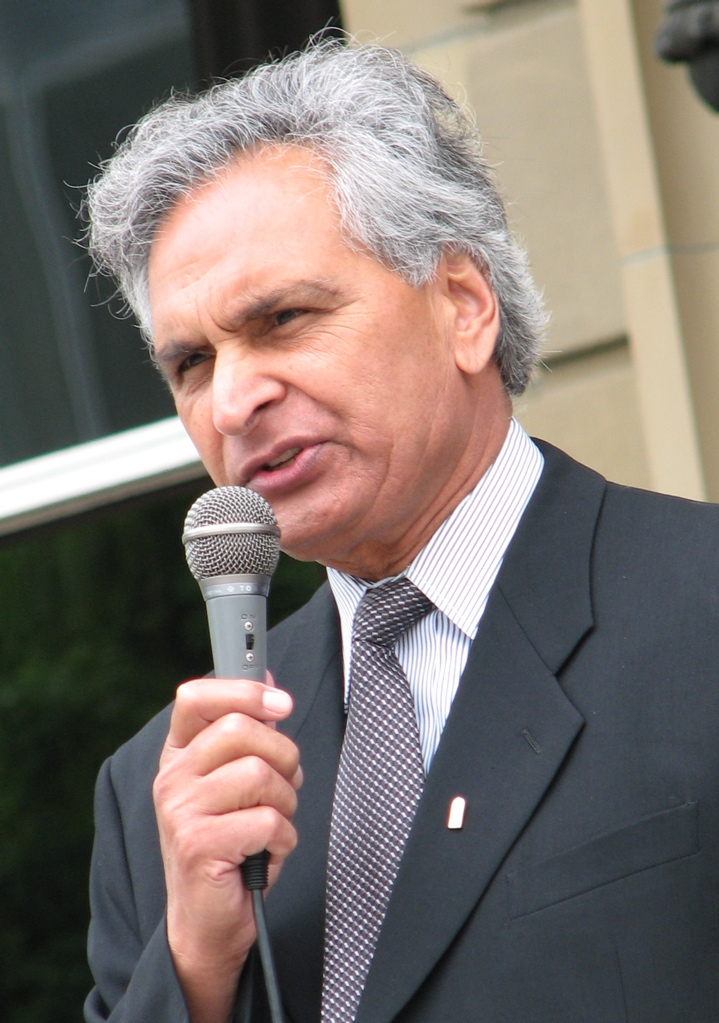
- Pannu in 2007

Leader of the Alberta New Democratic Party
- In office November 5, 2000 – July 13, 2004
- Preceded by: Pam Barrett
- Succeeded by: Brian Mason

Member of the Alberta Legislative Assembly for Edmonton-Strathcona
- In office March 11, 1997 – March 3, 2008
- Preceded by: Al Zariwny
- Succeeded by: Rachel Notley

Personal details
- Born: Rajinder Singh Pannu; January 12, 1934; Punjab Province, British India
- Died: January 30, 2025 (aged 91); Edmonton, Alberta, Canada
- Political party: New Democratic
- Occupation: University professor, teacher

Rajinder Singh Pannu (January 12, 1934 – January 30, 2025) was a Canadian politician and educator, who served as the leader of the Alberta New Democratic Party from 2000 to 2004, and served a member of the Legislative Assembly of Alberta (MLA) representing the riding of Edmonton-Strathcona from 1997 to 2008.

== Early life and education ==
Pannu was born in Punjab Province, British India, completing an undergraduate degree before immigrating to Canada in 1962. He settled in Whitecourt, Alberta, where he worked as a high school teacher until 1964.

In 1964 he moved to Edmonton to work on a graduate program, completing a PhD in sociology in 1973. He taught at York University for one year (1968–69) before returning to the University of Alberta, where he taught for 27 years until his retirement in 1996. He was Professor Emeritus at the University of Alberta.

== Political career ==
Pannu entered provincial politics in 1997 when he was first elected to the Legislative Assembly of Alberta representing the riding of Edmonton-Strathcona. Pannu became leader of the Alberta New Democratic Party in February 2000 after the previous leader, Pam Barrett, retired from politics.

Pannu ran a high-profile campaign in the 2001 Alberta election. T-shirts emblazoned with the slogan "Raj Against the Machine", as well as a reputation as a "likeable and honest politician" contributed to his popularity and made him a leader well respected by supporters and non-supporters alike.

He announced on July 13, 2004, that he was resigning as party leader. Fellow MLA Brian Mason, the deputy leader, became interim leader. Mason was formally elected leader in a leadership convention held on September 18. However, he sought re-election as an MLA in the 26th Alberta general election, and was re-elected by a wide margin.

On June 14, 2006, he announced his retirement from Alberta politics at the dissolution of the legislature, which took place in February 2008.

== Personal life and death ==
Pannu was married to Swinder and had one child, Savi. Pannu died in Edmonton on January 30, 2025, at the age of 91.
