= Michel Band =

1878–1958 Canadian indigenous nation

Michel First Nation
- People: Haudenosaunee / Cree / Métis people
- Headquarters: Calihoo, Alberta
- Province: Alberta

Land
- Other reserve: none

Website
- michelfirstnation.com

The Michel Band is an Indigenous nation of central Alberta, Canada, which the Government of Canada recognized as a nation and treaty partner from 1878 to 1958. The descendants of that historic band, now organized as an association called the Michel First Nation, are engaged in legal and political action to regain recognition.

The Michel Band was also referred to as the Michel Caillehoo, Michel Caillehouis, Michel Caillehow, Michel Calihoo, Michel Calistrois, or Michel Calliho Band, referring to the name of their chief at the time that they signed Treaty 6 with the Canadian Crown by adhesion on September 3, 1878.

In 1880, a 40-square-mile (100 km^{2}) Indian reserve was surveyed as "Michel I.R. 132" on the Sturgeon River, about 8 miles (13 km) from the Roman Catholic mission at St. Albert, northwest of Edmonton near the present-day town site of Villeneuve. The reserve was described and surveyed in September 1880 by G.A. Simpsona as "to a post on the right bank of the Sturgeon River and thence easterly along the said bank of the river to the point of beginning, containing an area of forty square miles more or less." and formalized by Order in Council PC 1151 on May 17, 1889.

Like all First Nations in the Edmonton area, the Michel Band members came under government and settler pressure to surrender their agricultural land. Land sales marked by government corruption steadily eroded their land base through the next half-century. In 1959 the entire band was "enfranchised"—removed from status as Indians in exchange for the right to vote in Canadian elections and removal from the strictures of the Indian Act on March 31, 1958, by Order in Council P.C. 375. The Michel Band was the only one in Canada to be enfranchised during the twentieth century.

The people of the modern-day Michel First Nation have ancestry primarily from the Haudenosaunee (Iroquois), Cree and Métis ethnic groups. A Haudenosaunee (Mohawk) man by the name of Louis Callihoo, born in 1782, came west in 1800 to work for the Northwest Company, spawning a large group of descendants, many of which live in Alberta today. In 1998, there were over 700 registered descendants.

Numbered-Treaties-Map

== History ==
The Michel band, composed of Haudenosaunee and their leader, called "Yellowhead", travelled from the east to avoid assassination because of a bounty offered by the American government for provable deaths of Haudenosaunee people. Iroquois Yellowhead was rumoured to be a descendant of the French Crown from a period when the Haudenosaunee were invited and visited the French King. He, Yellowhead, believed he had to leave the east to avoid being assassinated during the French Revolution, because of his rumored connection to the French aristocracy.

Michel and his band came to St. Albert, in Alberta, and he appealed to Father Lacombe, who had come to Alberta in 1852, to arrange a home for himself and his people, his family. Michel Reserve, north of St. Albert, became their land base. In 1880 Michel Calihoo (spelling differs), as leader of the band, signed treaty and the band settled on the "Michel Indian Reserve."

In 1958, almost the entire band gave up their Reserve and Treaty rights and were enfranchised. As Haudenosaunee, their style of government was based on voting, (American democracy is based on the Haudenosaunee style of government, each individual having the right to vote) and British colonial government policy was that Indians on reserves, Indigenous people who signed treaties, did not have the vote. So most of the Michel Band gave up their reserve and their treaty rights and moved into St. Albert, so that they could vote.

The Michel Band is the only First Nation in Canada in the 20th century to enfranchise as a group.

In 1985 many descendants of the historic Michel Band regained Indian status through Bill C-31. They have since that time lobbied the federal government to once again recognize them as an Indian band with Aboriginal and treaty rights.

== Louis Callihoo Kwarakwante "Yellowhead" ==
Many Michel Band members trace their ancestry to Louis Callihoo, a name used by people who could not spell his Haudenosaunee name. He was called "Yellowhead" and known as Kara Komptee, Kwarakwante. He was Mohawk (Mohawks are part of the Haudenosaunee Confederacy), born in 1782, Sault St. Louis, in what is now called Kahnawake, Quebec. He was known as "Le Soleil Voyageur", which may be a reference to the rumoured relationship to the French aristocracy; the French king, Louis XIV, known as "the Sun King". In 1800, Louis Kwarkwante, Yellowhead, signed on as a voyageur with the North West Company (a clerk changed his name to Caliheue) and travelled west from Montreal to Northern Alberta to work as a fur trader. He married three local women (a Sekani Native and two French-Cree Métis sisters). Mohawk, a Haudenosaunee language, may at one time have been the language of the band, but by the late 19th Century Father Albert Lacombe wrote that most band members spoke Cree or French. It seems likely that Michif, a mixed Cree-French language, was used by the Michel Band.

The Michel Band emerged as a distinct cultural and kinship group during the Canadian fur trade.

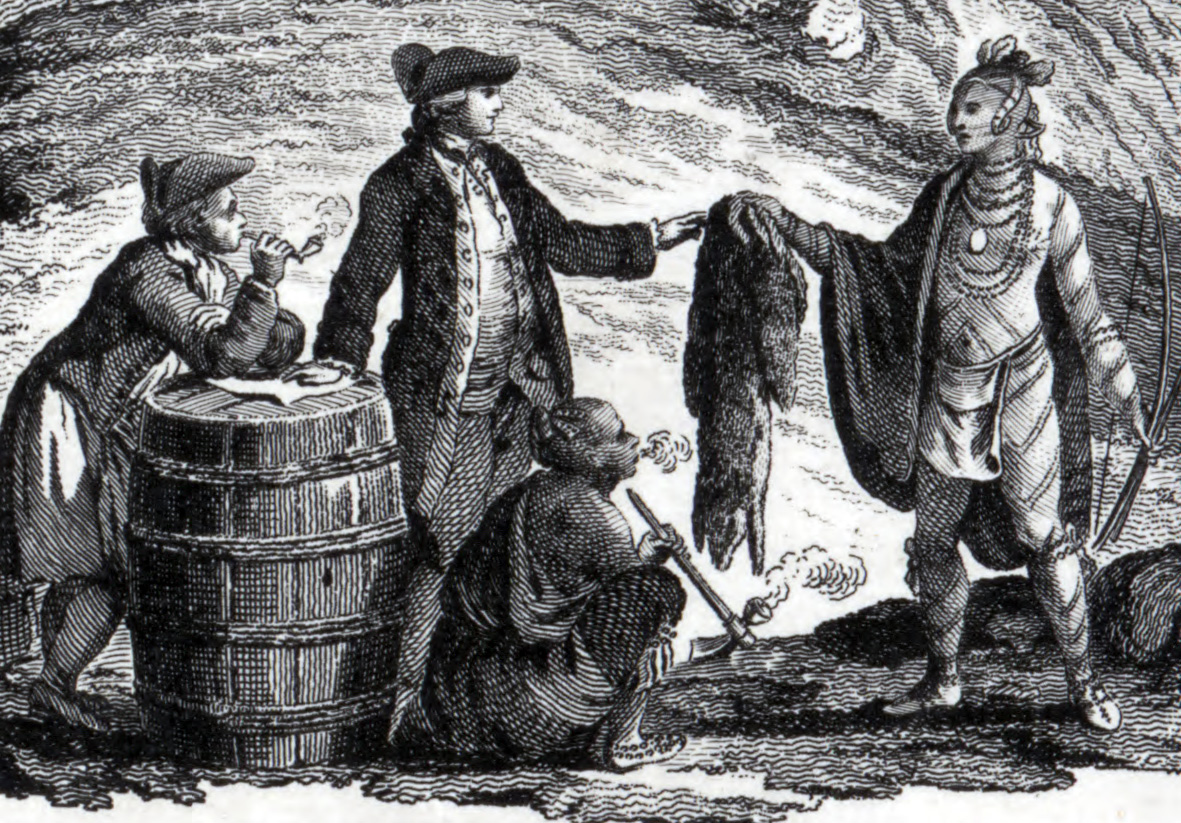
Fur traders in canada 1777

Louis Kwarakwante ("The Sun Traveller") was born in 1782 near the Catholic Mission of Saul St. Louis of Caughnawaga. It is speculated that Louis was Mohawk. The name Kwarakwante appears to be an incorrect translation of Garakontie. Records list his surname variously as "Karaconti. Karaquienthe, Caraquanti." Louis also went by the surname of Callihoo, which derived from "Karhioo" meaning "Tall Forest" in Haudenosaunee. Many members of his family, especially those who went west with the Fur Trade, had the name Karakontie bestowed on them by the clergy. Louis Kwarakwante was likely a grandson of Daniel Garakontie.

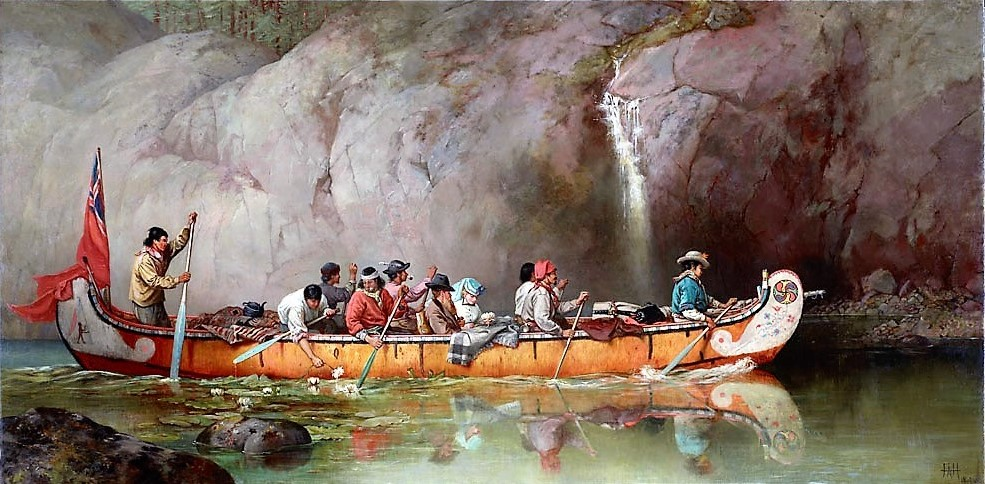
Canoe Manned by Voyageurs Passing a Waterfall

As early as 1800, the North West Company began to employ Haudenosaunee voyagers. Colin Robertson said he preferred the Haudenosaunee voyageurs to French-Canadians in a rapid or dangerous river crossing "for their calmness and presence of mind which never forsakes them in the greatest danger." This was still a common trend even up until 1872, when George Grant remarked:

"Our crews were chiefly Iroquois Indians from Caugh-naw-aga, near Montreal, the best voyagers known, according to the testimony of everyone who has tried them. The Iroquois made the engagement for the trip, and hired a few Ojibways bear the Shebandowan and Fort Francis to make up the necessary number. They were as fine-looking, clean-limbed men as one's eye could desire to rest on, punctual, diligent, uncomplaining, and reserving their chief affection for their canoes. As a jockey cherishes his horse and shepherd his dog, so do they care for their canoe."

The NWC undoubtedly hired Haudenosaunee from Caughnawaga not only for their experience, but also their familiarity with the Catholic clergy and the habitant seigneuries who had land holdings in the Missions. The Regardless, the bark longhouses still resembled those of in Mohawk Valley, and traditional agriculture was still practiced. In this Mission, Louis Callihoo learned his catechism and his prayers in his native tongue. He spoke French and later many other languages as well, which no doubt made his commercial dealings easier. He was contracted as a canoemen on November 23, 1800 by McTavish, Frobisher & Company, agents of the NWC.

== See also ==
- List of organizations that self-identify as FNIM governments
