= Alberta New Democratic Party =

Provincial political party in Canada

Coordinates: 53.5488°N 113.5181°W

- Abbreviation: Alberta NDP; NPD de l'Alberta
- Leader: Naheed Nenshi
- President: Bill Tonita
- Deputy Leader: Rakhi Pancholi
- Founded: 1 August 1932; 94 years ago (as Alberta CCF)
- Headquarters: 10544 114 Street NW; Suite 201; Edmonton, Alberta; T5H 3J7
- Youth wing: New Democratic Youth of Alberta
- Membership (2024): ▲85,227
- Ideology: Social democracy Canadian federalism
- Political position: Centre-left to left-wing
- National affiliation: New Democratic Party
- Colours: Orange
- Seats in Legislature: 39 / 87

Website
- Official website

The Alberta New Democratic Party (Alberta NDP; French: Nouveau Parti démocratique de l'Alberta, NPD de l'Alberta) is a social democratic political party in Alberta, Canada. The party sits on the centre-left to left-wing of the political spectrum and is the provincial Alberta affiliate of the federal New Democratic Party.

The successor to the Alberta section of the Co-operative Commonwealth Federation and the even earlier Alberta wing of the Canadian Labour Party and the United Farmers of Alberta. From the mid-1980s to 2004, the party abbreviated its name as the "New Democrats" (ND).

The party served as Official Opposition in the Legislative Assembly of Alberta from 1982 to 1993. It was shut out of the legislature following the 1993 election, returning in the 1997 election with two seats. The party won no more than four seats in subsequent elections until the 2015 election, in which it won 54 of the 87 seats in the legislature and formed a majority government. Until 2015, Alberta had been the only province in western Canada—the party's birthplace—where the NDP had never governed at the provincial level. The Alberta NDP was defeated after a single term in the 2019 election by the UCP—the first time that a governing party in Alberta had been unseated after a single term.

== History ==
=== Origins and early years (1932–1962) ===
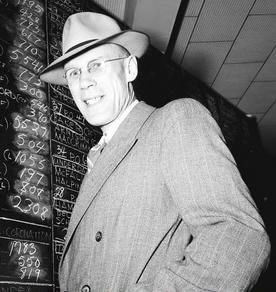
Elmer Ernest Roper was the leader of the Alberta CCF from 1942 to 1955 before becoming the Mayor of Edmonton in 1959

The Co-operative Commonwealth Federation (CCF) was founded in Calgary on 1 August 1932. The governing United Farmers of Alberta party and the Canadian Labour Party and Dominion Labor Party voted to join with the new party. However the UFA and the Labor parties continued to run candidates under their own labels until after the 1935 election, which was won by the newly founded Social Credit led by William Aberhart. Some sitting UFA Members of Parliament supported the CCF and ran unsuccessfully as CCF candidates in the 1935 federal election. The CCF did not run candidates in the 1935 provincial election due to its ties with the UFA and Labour parties. The UFA lost all its seats in the 1935 provincial and federal elections, and all Labour MLAs were defeated, due to the unpopularity of the UFA government and the strong popularity of William Aberhart's movement.

In 1936, William Irvine, a CCF founder and defeated UFA Member of Parliament, was elected the Alberta CCF's first president. In 1937, the UFA decided to leave electoral politics entirely and, in 1938, the CCF committed itself to run candidates in the next provincial and elections setting up local riding clubs for that purpose. In 1939, former UFA/CCF MLA Chester Ronning became the Alberta CCF's first leader in the 1940 provincial election but despite winning 11% of the vote the party did not win any seats in the Alberta Legislature - the CCF had not garnered the support of the UFA's conservative supporters or put a dent in support for the agrarian populism of the Social Credit Party of Alberta.

The Alberta wing of the Labour Party federated with the CCF in 1935, but ran its own candidates in the 1935 provincial election, which saw all three of its incumbent MLAs defeated, and one candidate in 1940. In 1942, the Alberta CCF clubs formally merged with the Dominion Labor Party and Canadian Labour Party clubs and Elmer Roper became the new leader after achieving an unexpected victory in a 1942 by-election, becoming the party's first Alberta MLA (excepting Chester Ronning, who had been elected in 1932 as a joint UFA/CCF candidate). In the next two years party membership soared from 2,500 to over 12,000.

In the 1944 election, the CCF received 24% of the vote but won only 2 seats, both of them in Edmonton and Calgary where the use of single transferable vote ensured fair representation. (The disproportionality was due to the way boundaries of the constituencies outside the cities were drawn and the use of Instant-runoff voting outside the cities, which did not help a lesser party like the CCF.) The Social Credit government received more than half of ballots cast. Roper was joined in the legislature by Aylmer Liesemer, a Calgary schoolteacher. The rise of support for the CCF after 1942 mobilized the business community to pull out of efforts to build an anti-Social Credit party and instead back the Social Credit government, now led by Ernest Manning, after William Aberhart's death in 1943, as a bulwark against socialists. Unlike the Saskatchewan CCF, which won office in the 1944 Saskatchewan election on a platform calling for social programs, the Alberta CCF was more radical and campaigned on provincial ownership of the province's resources and utilities. Irvine also advocated an alliance with the communist Labor-Progressive Party which would have been beneficial in the cities where the single transferable vote electoral system was used.

Through the 1940s and 1950s, the CCF took fewer votes, eventually falling under 10 percent. At any one time, the party never won more than two seats. The party was kept to two MLAs throughout the 1950s. Roper lost his seat in the 1955 election. In the same election, Stanley Ruzycki and Nick Dushenski were elected. Roper was succeeded as party leader by Floyd Albin Johnson. The 1959 general election was a disaster for the CCF, losing both its existing seats. Party leader Johnson, running in the Dunvegan electoral district, failed to win his seat, leaving the party shut out of the legislature.

=== Alberta NDP in opposition (1962–2015) ===
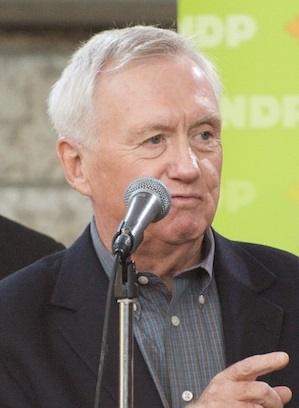
Ray Martin was the third Alberta NDP MLA elected and was the leader of the party from 1984 to 1993

The CCF merged with the Canadian Labour Congress in 1961, becoming the New Democratic Party of Canada. In Alberta, the NDP was founded in 1962 with a new leader, Neil Reimer, Canadian director of the Oil Workers International Union. The NDP did not, at first, build much on the CCF's popularity, and, with the exception of a 1966 by-election victory by Garth Turcott, did not win any seats until the 1971 election when Grant Notley, who had taken over the party in 1968, was elected to the legislature.

The socialist sentiment of the old CCF carried on in the Woodsworth-Irvine Socialist Fellowship, which became an affiliate to the party. This group was active in the 1970s and 1980s and dropped from active existence around 2005.

With the cancellation of single transferable voting in Edmonton in 1956, the NDP did not win a seat in Edmonton until 1982. (This is in strong contrast to the steady winning of one seat in Edmonton in each election, from the 1926 introduction of STV in Edmonton to 1952. The pattern in Calgary is similar. Although not successful in getting a seat in that city every election under STV, it was not until 1986 that a CCF or NDP MLA was elected in Calgary, following STV's cessation in 1956.)

==== Rise to Official Opposition ====
The election of the Progressive Conservatives in 1971 led to the gradual collapse of Social Credit. The Alberta Liberal Party suffered in the late 1970s and early 1980s due to its association with the unpopular federal Liberal Party government of Prime Minister Pierre Trudeau.

The decline of Social Credit and the unpopularity of the Liberals allowed the New Democrats to become the main opposition to the Lougheed-led Conservatives. Under Grant Notley's leadership from 1968 to 1984, the NDP's popularity gradually increased. It grew from 10% in the 1971 election to 19% in the 1982 election. Despite winning only two seats, the party became the Official Opposition in 1982.

In the 1986 election, under Ray Martin's leadership, the party won 30% of the vote and 16 seats, marking a high point for New Democrat support. Party membership increased from around 5,000 in the 1970s to 20,000 after the 1986 provincial election. However, the New Democrats were unable to gain additional seats in the 1989 election. While they remained the Official Opposition in the legislature, their popular support fell behind the Liberals for the first time in decades, with the Liberals at 28% and the NDs at 26%.

==== Wipeout and recovery ====
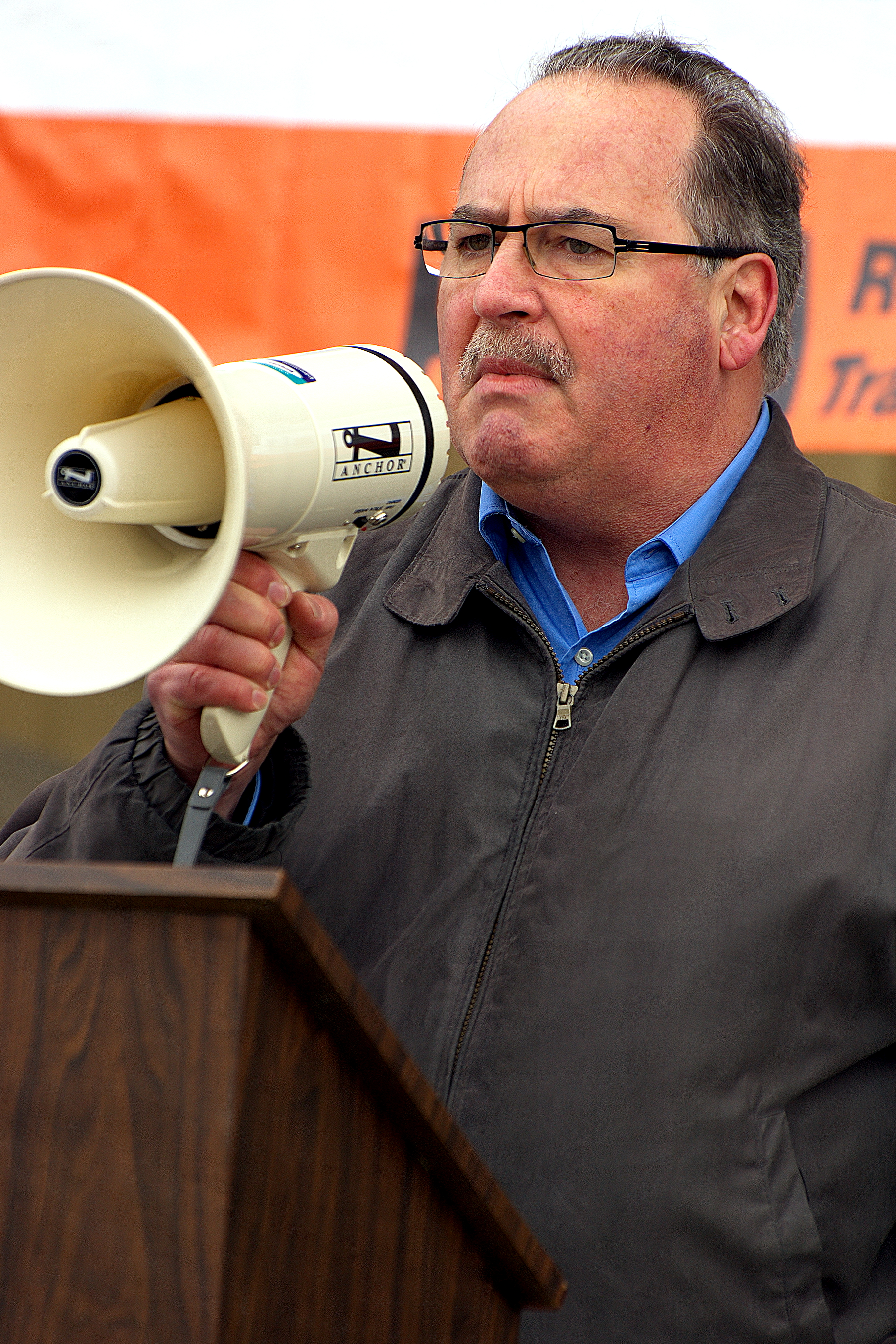
Brian Mason was elected leader in 2004 and became the longest serving Alberta NDP MLA in the party's history before retiring in 2019

In the 1993 election, their popular vote fell by more than half to 11%, and they were shut out of the legislature altogether. This was mainly due to the anti-PC vote consolidating around the Liberals. Both the Liberals and Tories were preaching the need for fiscal conservatism at the time. Ray Martin resigned as leader and was succeeded first by Ross Harvey and then by Pam Barrett. The party regained its presence in the legislature by winning two seats in the 1997 election. Barrett resigned her position as party leader in 2000 after claiming a near-death experience in a dentist's chair. She was succeeded by Raj Pannu. The party retained its two seats in the 2001 election.

In 2004, the party reverted to the traditional "NDP" abbreviation and the colour orange. That same year Raj Panu resigned as leader and was replaced by Brian Mason. In the 2004 Alberta general election the party doubled its seats from two to four—which re-elected then leader Brian Mason and Raj Pannu, returning former leader Ray Martin, and newcomer David Eggen. The party received 10% of the vote province-wide.

In the 2008 election, the party was reduced to two seats. Brian Mason was re-elected as was newcomer Rachel Notley. Ray Martin and David Eggen were narrowly defeated. The party received 8.5% of the popular vote.

==== Attempts at political cooperation ====
At its 2008 provincial convention, the party overwhelmingly rejected a proposal by the Environment Caucus recommending a party task force be mandated to "investigate a variety of options for political cooperation with the Alberta Liberals and/or Greens." and "to prepare a motion to be considered" at the next Party Convention. The proposal was opposed by NDP leader Brian Mason.

Alberta Federation of Labour President Gil McGowan independently distributed a proposal for a cooperation pact with the Alberta Liberal Party and Alberta Greens to defeat Progressive Conservative candidates. The proposal, titled "The Way Forward: An AFL proposal for a united alternative to the Conservatives," suggested that the parties not compete against each other in certain ridings. Although McGowan was unable to speak on the issue before the resolution was defeated, he later addressed it during his report to the Convention as AFL President. He urged members to acknowledge the need for significant change in light of 40 years of Tory government and the recent election results.

==== Growing momentum ====
In the 2012 provincial election the NDP picked up two seats in Edmonton, regaining their previous 4 seat total. Both Rachel Notley and Brian Mason safely held onto their seats while David Eggen was re-elected as the member for Edmonton-Calder. Newcomer Deron Bilous was also elected in Edmonton-Beverly-Clareview, the seat formerly held by Martin. In many other ridings the party also won more votes than it had attained previously.

On 29 April 2014, Brian Mason announced that he would step down as leader as soon as a leadership election could be held to choose his successor. The leadership convention was held in Edmonton from 18-19 October 2014. Rachel Notley was elected as the party's next leader, defeating fellow MLA David Eggen and union leader Rod Loyola in the first ballot with 70% of the vote.

=== First government (2015–2019) ===
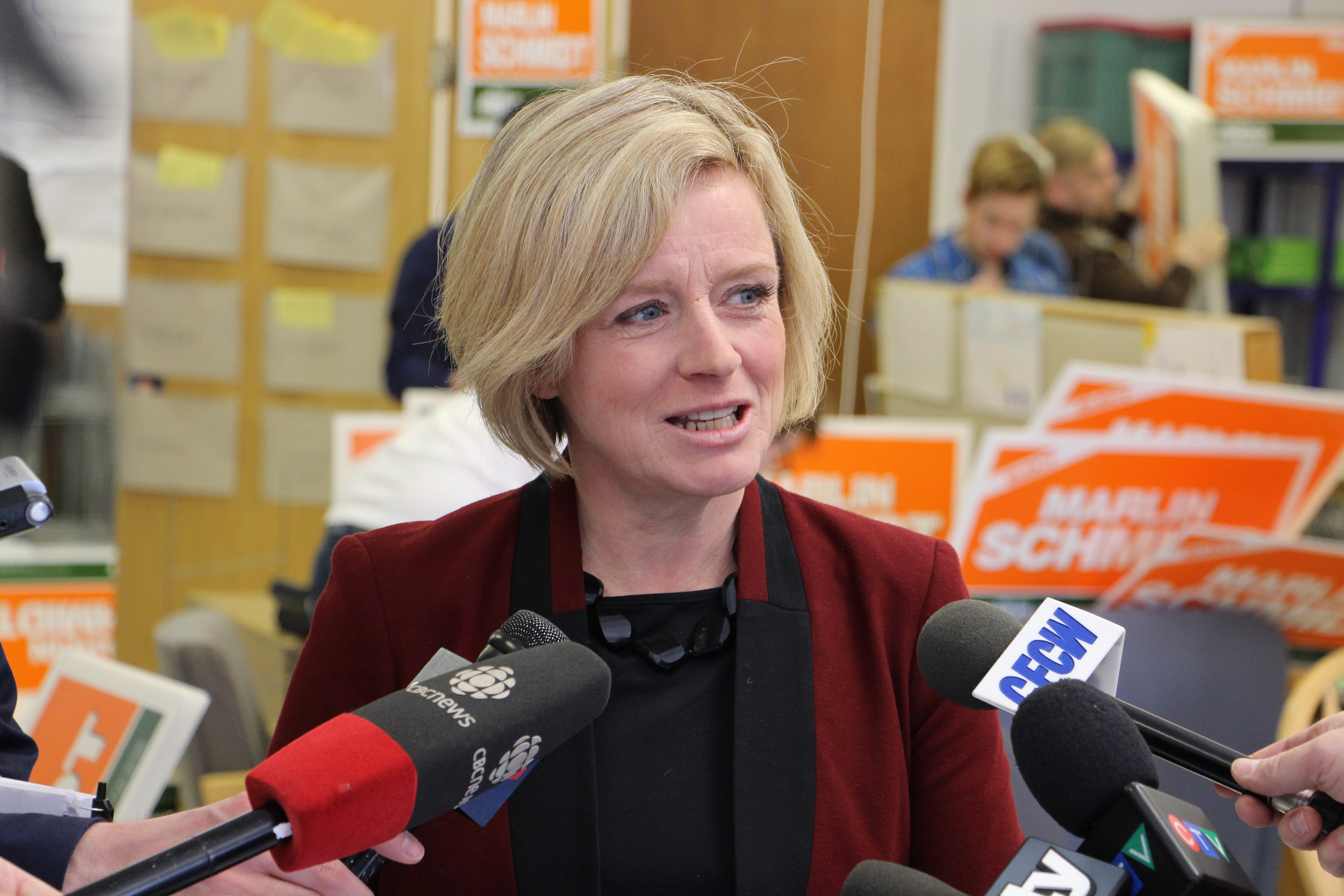
Former leader Rachel Notley during the 2015 campaign in which the Alberta NDP formed its first ever government

The incumbent PC premier Jim Prentice called an election on 7 April 2015, following the reveal of a new budget to strengthen his party's mandate. On election night, the NDP won 54 seats, re-electing all four of their incumbents as well as 50 new members to the legislative assembly. The NDP had high expectations for Edmonton, given Notley's local ties and the city's historically favourable stance towards centre-left parties. Surpassing all projections, the party won every seat in the capital and also swept Red Deer and Lethbridge. They also secured 15 seats in Calgary, the long-standing stronghold of the Tories, and gained 16 more seats across the rest of Alberta, mostly in the northern and central regions.

The Notley Government was characterized by a small cabinet and an intense focus on the economy. At the time of the early election call Alberta was sinking into a deep recession caused by the collapse of world oil prices. As a result of the province's dependence on oil royalties over more traditional revenue sources, Alberta's deficit soared. After reversing prior budget cuts, Notley mostly shied away from major wealth redistribution and preferred to stimulate the economy through infrastructure spending and maintaining public services. Most new programs, such as school lunches, were introduced cautiously through pilot programs. Despite ostensibly being a party of labour, the NDP froze wages and generally took the side of management in labour disputes, and a higher minimum wage was phased in relatively slowly. Labour code changes were generally incremental, though an update to labour standards on farms was extremely divisive in rural Alberta. However, Notley moved forwards with a carbon pricing scheme and plans for sustainability and energy transitions early in her term. Controversially such plans were framed around creating a social license for pursuing oil sand expansion, and she championed the creation of pipelines and partnered heavily with the oil industry. As a result plans to raise oil royalties were scrapped, and tax increases on corporations and higher income brackets were modest. Eventually this led to a schism between the NDP governments of Alberta and British Columbia over the twinning of the Transmountain Pipeline, which remained a contentious project in the Canadian political arena and particularly within the federal New Democratic Party. While the Alberta economy recovered from the depths of the energy recession by 2019, the oil industry remained relatively stagnant and economic growth had been nowhere near what Alberta had enjoyed in the previous decade.

=== Return to opposition (2019–present) ===
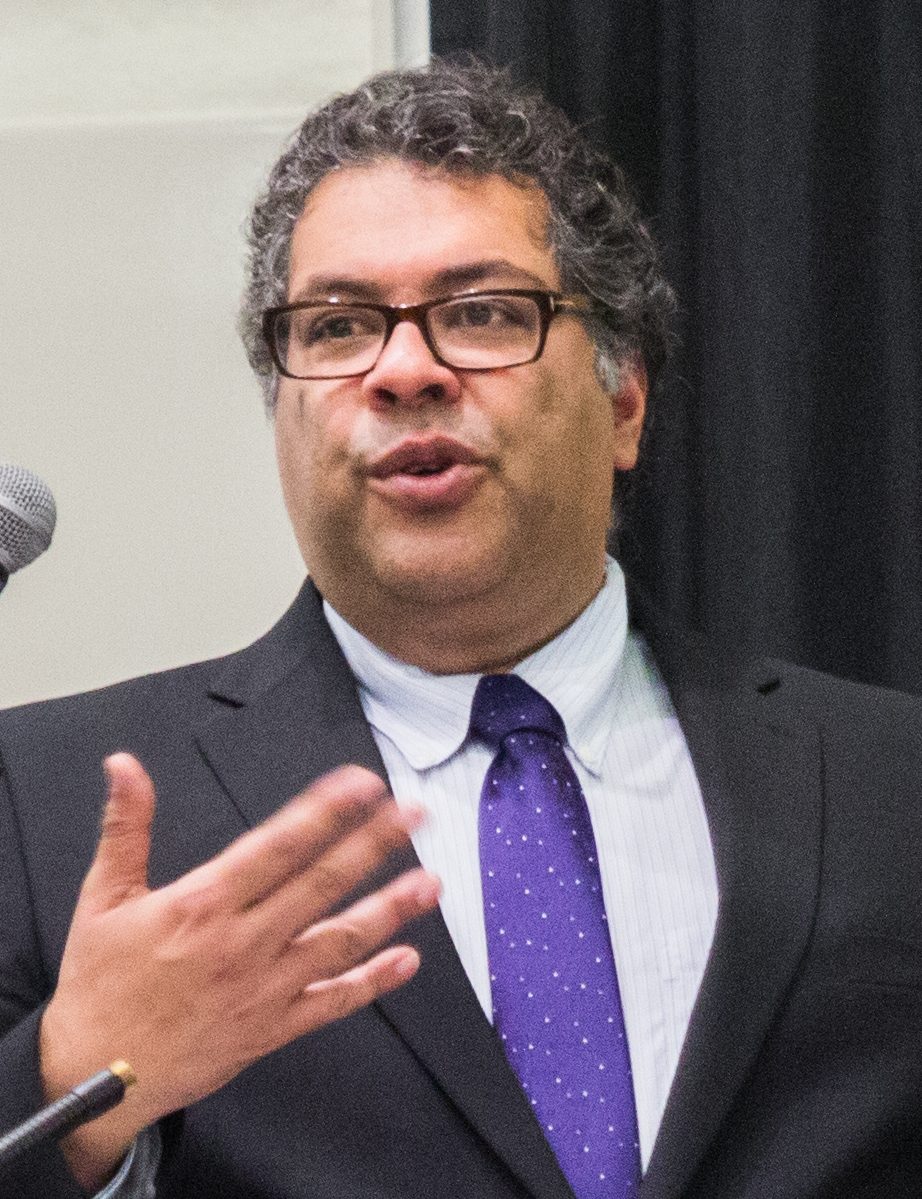
Naheed Nenshi is the current leader of the Alberta NDP.

The NDP was dealt a severe blow when the PCs and Wildrose merged to form the UCP, which immediately ascended to a large lead in opinion polling.

In the 2019 election, the NDP suffered a significant defeat to the UCP. Despite receiving more votes compared to the previous election, the NDP lost a majority of their seats, ending with only 24 seats. The party performed well in Edmonton but struggled in the rest of the province, winning only a few seats in Calgary, the Edmonton suburbs, and Lethbridge. This was the first time in Alberta's history that an incumbent government has been defeated after one term. Rachel Notley remained popular within the NDP and continued as the Leader of the Opposition, leading the largest opposition caucus in Alberta since 1993.

In the 2023 election, the NDP received a record high popular vote for the party with 44%, dominating Edmonton and gaining a significant portion of the vote in Calgary. However, their success was largely limited to urban areas as they only won one rural seat Banff-Kananaskis. With 38 MLAs, the party elected the largest official opposition in Alberta history.

On 16 January 2024, Notley announced she would be resigning as party leader effective the next leadership election, scheduled for 22 June 2024. Former Calgary mayor Naheed Nenshi emerged victorious, winning with 86% of the vote, the largest for any winner of a provincial leadership election of any major political party in Canada.

On 3 May 2025, the Alberta NDP voted to end automatic joint membership with the federal NDP, giving provincial members the option to opt out of federal membership. The move had been proposed by Nenshi during his leadership campaign.

== Party leaders ==
- denotes acting or interim leader

=== CCF ===
#	Leader	Term		Notes
1	Chester Ronning	1939	1942	
2	Elmer Ernest Roper	1942	1955	
*	Nick Dushenski	1955	1959	House Leader
3	Floyd Albin Johnson	1957	1962	

=== NDP ===
#	Leader	Term		Notes
1	Neil Reimer	27 January 1963	10 November 1968	Interim leader 1962–1963
2	Grant Notley	10 November 1968	19 October 1984	Leader of the Opposition 1982–1984, died in office
3	Ray Martin	10 November 1984	5 February 1994	Leader of the Opposition, 1985–1993
4	Ross Harvey	5 February 1994	8 September 1996	
5	Pam Barrett	8 September 1996	2 February 2000	
6	Raj Pannu	5 November 2000	13 July 2004	
7	Brian Mason	13 July 2004	18 October 2014	
8	Rachel Notley	18 October 2014	22 June 2024	17th Premier of Alberta, 2015–2019; Leader of the Opposition, 2019–2024
9	Naheed Nenshi	22 June 2024	Present	Leader of the Opposition, 2025–present

== Election results ==
=== Legislative Assembly ===
Election	Leader	Votes	%	Seats	+/−	Position	Status
1940	Chester Ronning	34,316	11.1	0 / 57	Steady	5th	No seats
1944	Elmer Ernest Roper	70,307	24.2	2 / 60	▲2	▲3rd	Third party
1948	Elmer Ernest Roper	56,387	19.1	2 / 57	Steady	▲2nd	Opposition
1952	Elmer Ernest Roper	41,929	14.0	2 / 60	Steady	▼3rd	Third party
1955	Elmer Ernest Roper	31,180	8.2	2 / 61	Steady	▼4th	Fourth party
1959	Floyd Albin Johnson	17,899	4.3	0 / 65	▼2	▼5th	No seats
1963	Neil Reimer	37,133	9.5	0 / 63	Steady	▲4th	No seats
1967	Neil Reimer	79,610	16.0	0 / 65	Steady	4th	No seats
1971	Grant Notley	73,038	11.4	1 / 75	▲1	▲3rd	No status
1975	Grant Notley	76,360	12.9	1 / 75	Steady	3rd	No status
1979	Grant Notley	111,984	15.8	1 / 79	Steady	3rd	No status
1982	Grant Notley	177,166	18.7	2 / 79	▲1	▲2nd	Opposition
1986	Ray Martin	208,561	29.2	16 / 83	▲14	2nd	Opposition
1989	Ray Martin	217,972	26.3	16 / 83	Steady	2nd	Opposition
1993	Ray Martin	108,883	11.0	0 / 83	▼16	▼3rd	No seats
1997	Pam Barrett	83,292	8.8	2 / 83	▲2	3rd	No status (Note: Despite failing to win the required number of seats, the party was later granted official status by the PC government.)
2001	Raj Pannu	81,339	8.0	2 / 83	Steady	3rd	No status
2004	Brian Mason	90,897	10.2	4 / 83	▲2	3rd	Third party
2008	Brian Mason	80,578	8.5	2 / 83	▼2	3rd	No status
2012	Brian Mason	127,074	9.9	4 / 87	▲2	▼4th	Fourth party
2015	Rachel Notley	603,461	40.6	54 / 87	▲50	▲1st	Majority government
2019	Rachel Notley	619,147	32.7	24 / 87	▼30	▼2nd	Opposition
2023	Rachel Notley	777,397	44.0	38 / 87	▲14	2nd	Opposition

== See also ==
- List of articles about Alberta CCF/NDP members
- List of Alberta general elections
- List of Alberta political parties
- Alberta New Democratic Party leadership elections
- Alberta New Democratic Party candidates in the 2012 Alberta provincial election

== Notes ==
Preceded by Progressive Conservative Association of Alberta	Governing party of Alberta; 2015–2019	Succeeded by United Conservative Party
