= Rachel Notley =

Premier of Alberta from 2015 to 2019

The Honourable Rachel Notley ECA
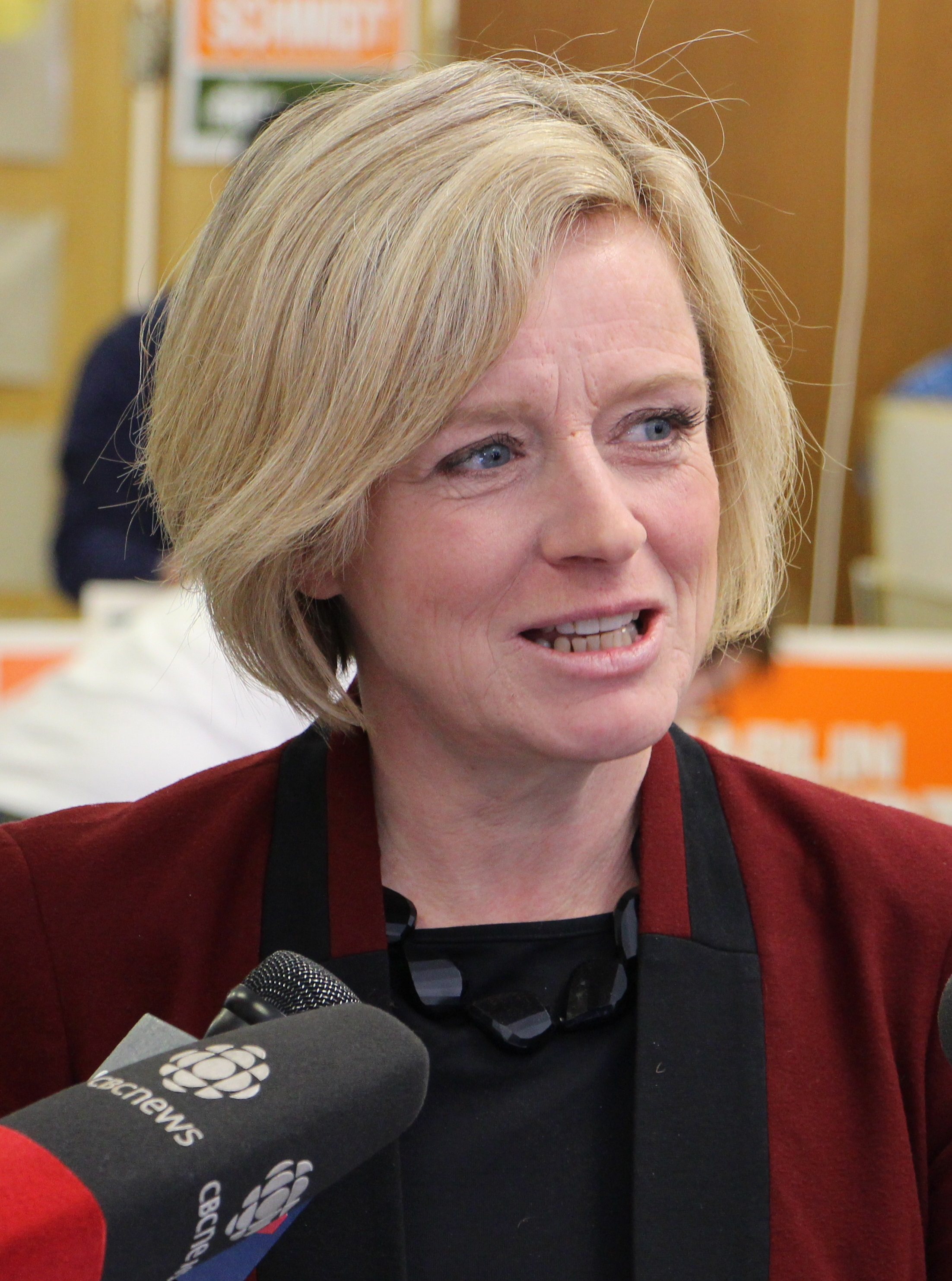
- Notley in 2015

17th Premier of Alberta
- In office May 24, 2015 – April 30, 2019
- Monarch: Elizabeth II
- Lieutenant Governor: Donald Ethell; Lois Mitchell
- Deputy: Sarah Hoffman
- Preceded by: Jim Prentice
- Succeeded by: Jason Kenney

Leader of the Opposition in Alberta
- In office April 30, 2019 – June 24, 2024
- Preceded by: Jason Kenney
- Succeeded by: Christina Gray

Leader of the Alberta New Democratic Party
- In office October 18, 2014 – June 22, 2024
- Preceded by: Brian Mason
- Succeeded by: Naheed Nenshi

Member of the Legislative Assembly of Alberta for Edmonton-Strathcona
- In office March 3, 2008 – December 30, 2024
- Preceded by: Raj Pannu
- Succeeded by: Naheed Nenshi

Personal details
- Born: Rachel Anne Notley; April 17, 1964 (age 62) Edmonton, Alberta, Canada
- Party: New Democratic
- Spouse: Lou Arab (m. 1997)
- Children: 2
- Parent: Grant Notley (father)
- Education: University of Alberta; York University
- Profession: Lawyer

Rachel Anne Notley ECA (born April 17, 1964) is a Canadian lawyer and former politician who was the 17th premier of Alberta from 2015 to 2019 and leader of the Alberta New Democratic Party (NDP) from 2014 to 2024. Notley was the member of the Legislative Assembly (MLA) for Edmonton-Strathcona from 2008 to 2024.

The daughter of former Alberta NDP leader Grant Notley, she was a lawyer before entering politics; she focused on labour law, with a specialty in workers' compensation advocacy and workplace health and safety issues.

Notley was first elected to the Legislative Assembly in the 2008 provincial election, succeeding former NDP leader Raj Pannu. Six years later on October 18, 2014, Notley won the Alberta New Democratic Party leadership election on the first ballot with 70% of the vote and went on to lead the party to a majority victory in the 2015 provincial election, ending 44 years of rule by the Progressive Conservative Association of Alberta. In the 2019 provincial election, the NDP government was defeated by the United Conservative Party, making Notley the Opposition leader. In the 2023 provincial election, the NDP made large gains but failed to form government, with Notley continuing as Opposition leader.

On January 16, 2024, Notley announced her plans to step down as leader of the Alberta NDP, but she would remain leader until a successor was elected on June 22. On June 22, Notley was succeeded as leader of the Alberta NDP by Naheed Nenshi, and was succeeded as Leader of the Opposition by Christina Gray on June 24. On December 12, Notley announced her intention to resign as an MLA, effective December 30. She returned to practising labour law following her resignation.

== Background ==
"My parents taught me that an NDPer in Alberta has to work three times harder than any other politician to earn votes. It's a lesson I won't forget."

— Rachel Notley on her parents' influence in 2007

Notley was born on April 17, 1964, in Edmonton, Alberta, and was raised outside of the town of Fairview, Alberta, the daughter of Sandra Mary "Sandy" (Wilkinson) and Alberta NDP Leader and MLA Grant Notley. She is the first Alberta premier to be born in Edmonton. Notley is the sister of Paul Notley and Stephen Notley, author and illustrator of Bob the Angry Flower. Her mother, a devout Anglican, was born in Concord, Massachusetts, and moved to Alberta as an adult.

Notley was unafraid to challenge older political leaders as a college student, even asking her father at an Alberta NDP public meeting on poverty and student debt for his advice to a "poor student whose parents made too much money for her to get a loan while at the same time being too cheap to give her enough money to buy food."

Notley credits her mother Sandy with getting her involved in activism, taking Notley to an anti-war demonstration before she was even ten years old. She remained unsure about whether or not to enter public office until she was in her 30s. Alongside her own family background, Notley has also cited her high school social studies teacher Jim Clevette as having made a lasting impact when it comes to her interest in politics. She has also claimed Jack Layton as being a personal hero.

Notley was a twenty-year-old undergraduate at the University of Alberta when her father died on October 19, 1984. After attending a large party she received a call at four in the morning from Tom Sigurdson, her father's executive assistant, stating that there had been a plane crash and that she should return home. This was not the first accident her father had been in; as part of his frequent trips across the province he had already been in several other plane accidents as well as an automobile collision with an elk. Fellow NDP MLA and future Alberta NDP leader Ray Martin later called to confirm to Notley that her father was indeed dead. It was then left up to Notley to inform her mother of the news. A day after her election as Alberta NDP leader, she would lead the 30th anniversary memorial of her father's death.

Notley earned a Bachelor of Arts (BA) in Political Science at the University of Alberta, and a law degree at Osgoode Hall Law School. While at Osgoode Hall she became active in the 1989 federal NDP leadership convention where she endorsed second-place finisher and former BC premier Dave Barrett.

In August 1997, she married Lou Arab, a communications representative for the Canadian Union of Public Employees (CUPE) and a campaign strategist for the party. The wedding ceremony was conducted by Tim Stevenson on Indian Arm. She lives with him and their two children in the historic district of Old Strathcona in south-central Edmonton.

Notley is a cyclist, jogger, and skier, as well as a reformed smoker.

== Activism ==
After law school, Notley articled for Edmonton labour lawyer Bob Blakely, and went on to work for the Alberta Union of Provincial Employees representing members with Workers' Compensation cases.

In 1994, Notley moved to Vancouver, British Columbia, where she worked for the Health Sciences Association of BC as their occupational health and safety officer. During her time in BC, she worked for one year as a ministerial assistant to Attorney General Ujjal Dosanjh. In this role, she was part of the team that first expanded the application of BC's family relations laws to same sex couples, several years before the Government of Canada took similar initiatives.

Notley acted as a representative of the provincial labour movement in the negotiation and drafting of new workplace health and safety standards.

During her time in Vancouver, Notley was active with "Moms on the Move", an organization that advocated for the rights of special needs children. She is also a past board member of the Vancouver Community College. Notley returned to Edmonton in 2002. She worked for a short time for the National Union of Public and General Employees (NUPGE), worked at Athabasca University, acted as volunteer co-ordinator for the Friends of Medicare "Romanow Now" campaign, and finally as a labour relations officer for the United Nurses of Alberta.

Notley did volunteer work with the Strathcona Community League in 2006, assisting with a drive to garner support for the installation of sidewalks in east Strathcona.

== Early political career (1991–2015) ==
=== Entry into provincial politics ===
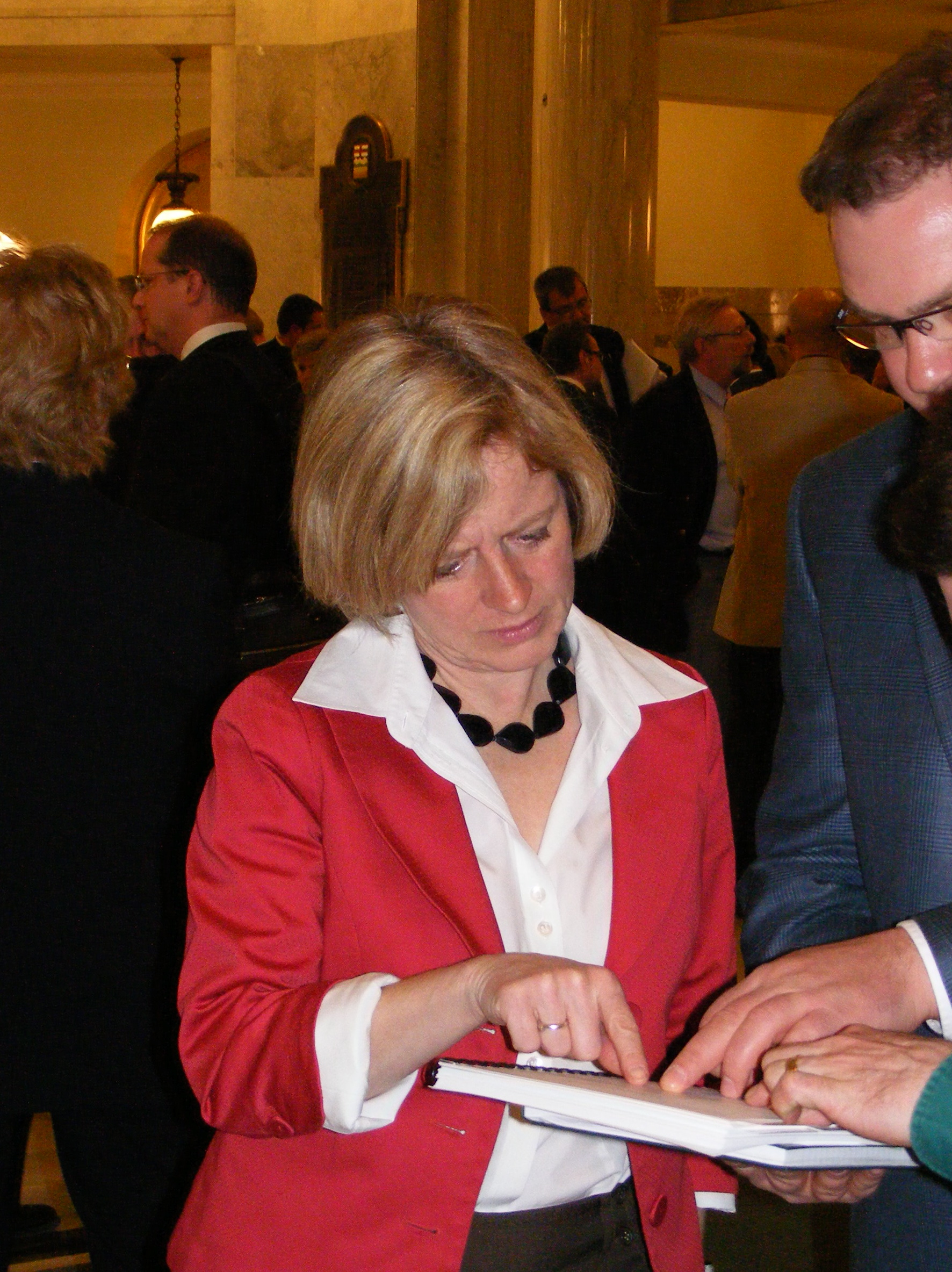
Rachel Notley as an MLA in 2009

In 1991, Notley led the election-planning subcommittee for the Alberta NDP. However, the party lost in the 1993 provincial election and was shut out of the legislature. In 2000, after the resignation of Pam Barrett as the Alberta NDP leader and MLA for Edmonton-Highlands, Notley re-entered Alberta provincial politics. She travelled to Edmonton to assist Brian Mason in retaining the seat for the Alberta NDP.

In October 2006, she was nominated by acclamation as the Alberta NDP candidate in the provincial constituency of Edmonton-Strathcona, succeeding former Alberta NDP leader Raj Pannu. The event was attended by then Federal NDP leader Jack Layton. She was subsequently elected as an MLA in the 2008 Alberta provincial election.

She was re-elected in the 2012 Alberta provincial election.

On October 18, 2014, Notley won the leadership of Alberta's New Democratic Party with 70% support, succeeding Brian Mason and becoming the 9th leader of the party. She defeated fellow MLA David Eggen and union leader Rod Loyola on the first ballot.

In addition to serving as party leader, Notley was critic for Health, International and Intergovernmental Relations, Status of Women, Justice, and Executive Council.

=== 2015 election ===
"Tonight, I also want to say that I'm also thinking about my mother and father. I know my mother would be completely over the moon about this. I think my dad would too. I'm sorry he couldn't see this. This really was his life's work but I can say this: I know how proud he'd be of the province we all love."

— Rachel Notley during her 2015 victory speech

Notley's first leadership test was in the May 5, 2015 provincial election. Following the reveal of a budget that slashed social spending, raised taxes and fees, and held the line on low corporate taxes, the incumbent Progressive Conservative premier, Jim Prentice, called the election. With the Official Opposition Wildrose Party reeling from a series of floor crossings and mass defections, most pundits and commentators felt that the PCs had a good shot at winning their thirteenth consecutive majority in the Legislature. With strong polling in Edmonton, some felt the Alberta NDP would form the official opposition.

By the middle of the campaign, however, pollsters began predicting a three-way race between the Progressive Conservatives, the Alberta NDP, and the Wildrose Party. Notley had managed to capitalize on the unpopularity of the PCs' budget, stating that she would instead raise corporate taxes and rollback fees and cuts. The sole televised leaders' debate proved to be a turning point, with Notley largely viewed as having the best performance. Jim Prentice also came under fire for saying "I know math is difficult" to Notley, in reference to the embarrassing miscalculation in the proposed NDP budget released two days prior, a remark which was widely seen as sexist and patronizing.

By the final week, the NDP emerged as the front runner. On election night, the NDP won 54 seats, re-electing their four incumbents as well as 50 new members to the Legislative Assembly. The NDP took all of Edmonton's ridings with large majorities, while massive vote-splitting allowed them to take 15 seats in Calgary. This ended the longest unbroken run in government at the provincial level in Canada.

Notley later told the Canadian Press that she had been sitting in a hotel room in either Calgary or Lethbridge when she saw a very credible poll showing the NDP was poised to rebound from a mere four seats in the legislature – the minimum for official party status – to an outright majority. She dropped her plans for a whirlwind schedule to close out the campaign. Not only would she have looked haggard in her first speech as premier-elect, but she needed time to begin a transition.

== Premier (2015–2019) ==
Notley held her first caucus meeting as Premier-designate on May 9, 2015. Three days later, Notley announced that she would be retaining the previous head of the Alberta public service, Richard Dicerni, as well as appointing NDP party strategists Brian Topp and Adrienne King as her chief of staff and deputy chief of staff, respectively. She also met with outgoing Premier Jim Prentice that same day, in addition to extending the deadline for the province's school boards to submit their budgets, her first major deviation from the previous Progressive Conservative government's financial commitments as Premier-designate.

On May 22, 2015, Notley suspended Calgary-Bow MLA Deborah Drever from the Alberta NDP caucus after a series of controversial postings by Drever were discovered on social media websites such as Instagram and Facebook. Notley had previously announced that she had directed Drever, as a result of the media attention, to create a plan to improve education on violence against women, particularly outreach to groups working with vulnerable young women. This was before a later image surfaced which was considered to be homophobic, something which Notley apologized for on behalf of the party.

=== Swearing-in ===
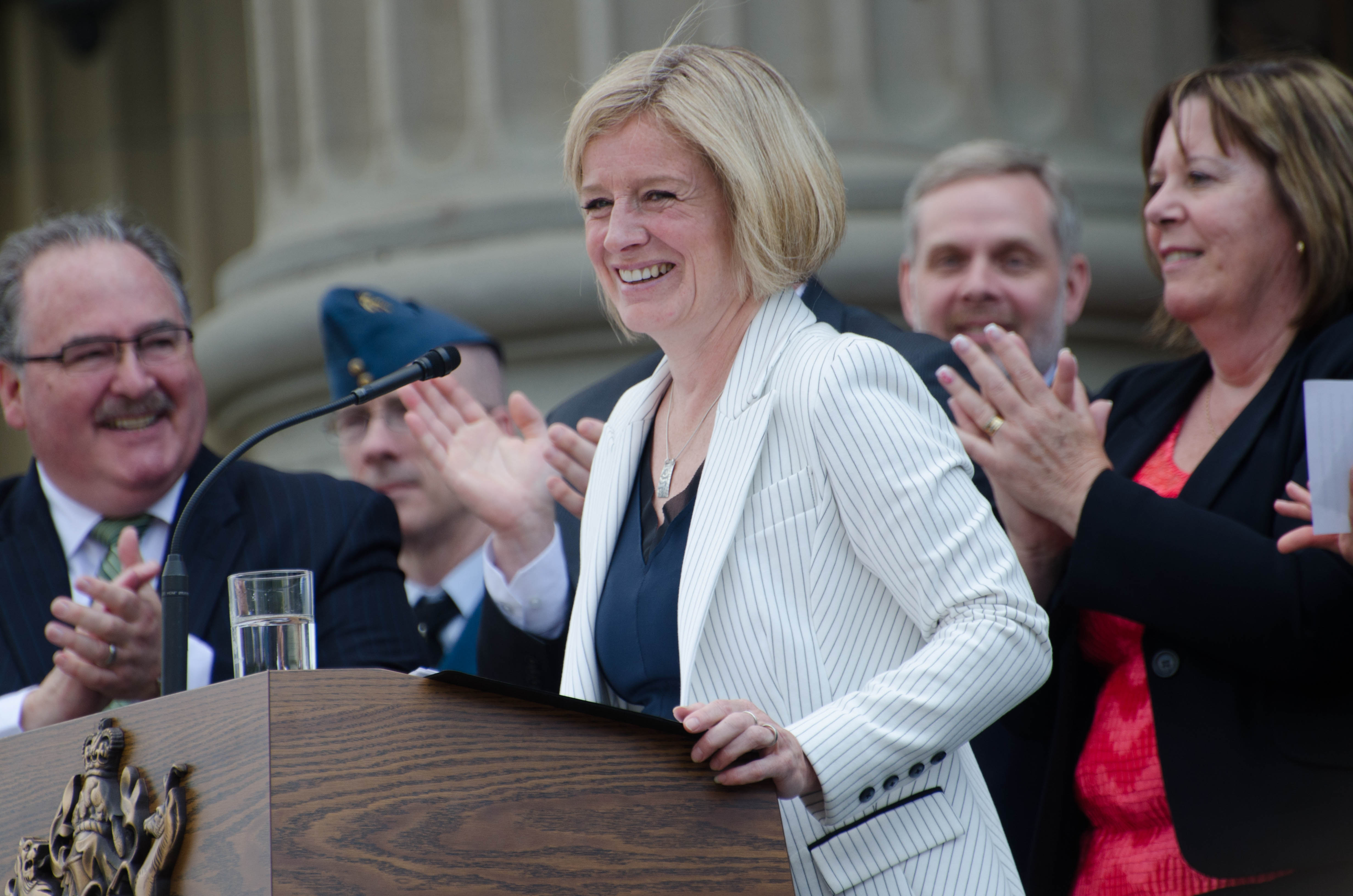
Rachel Notley after being sworn in as the 17th Premier of Alberta alongside her cabinet on the steps of the Alberta Legislature Building

Notley was sworn in as the 17th premier of Alberta along with her cabinet on May 24, 2015. Her twelve-member cabinet was the smallest in the country, containing only 14% of the legislature's members.

The swearing-in ceremony was a public event, held on the steps of the Alberta Legislature Building in front of a large crowd of spectators while a folk band played the national anthem and free popsicles and food were distributed from food trucks.

=== Speech from the Throne ===
The government's first throne speech was read by Lieutenant Governor Lois Mitchell on June 15, 2015. The speech announced three bills intended to ban corporate and union donations to political parties and to increase taxes on large corporations and high income earners, ending the flat tax rate that had been in place since the premiership of Ralph Klein. Both of these proposals were promised as part of the Alberta NDP's election platform. That same day Notley also announced the creation of a seventeen-member all-party committee tasked to look into ways to improve government accountability in areas such as whistleblower protection, electioneering, and conflicts of interest. The government also reached out to the Opposition benches by having the committee be initiated through a joint motion with Wildrose Party leader Brian Jean, with Liberal leader David Swann also being tasked with helping conduct a review of provincial mental health policy along with NDP MLA Danielle Larivee.

=== Aboriginal relations ===
On June 22, 2015, Notley apologized to the Aboriginal community of Alberta for a long history of neglect by prior governments. In particular she apologized for the province not addressing the issue with decades of abuse at government- and church-operated residential schools. Notley pledged that her government would engage and improve living conditions of Alberta's Aboriginal community.

On December 8, 2015, Notley tweeted out her support of Prime Minister Justin Trudeau's announcement that a national inquiry into missing and murdered indigenous women and girls would be immediately launched. On December 15, 2015, Notley expressed her support for the recommendations outlined in the Truth and Reconciliation Committee's final report.

The budget of 2017 included $100 million to upgrade the provincial and federal waterworks facilities that provide drinkable water for Albertan First Nations Communities.

In 2018, the Albertan government sold 150 hectares of land to the Fort McKay Métis for $1.6 million. The dealing was a precedent-setting event for the Métis community.

=== Climate change and environment ===
On November 22, 2015, Notley unveiled Alberta's updated climate change strategy, in time for the COP 21 conference in Paris. The plan included an economy-wide carbon price starting in 2017 and a cap on emissions from the oil sands. The plan also included a phase-out of coal-fired electricity by 2030, a 10-year goal to halve methane emissions, as well as incentives for renewable energy.

In November 2016, $1.4 billion was paid to compensate three major Albertan power producers (ATCO, Capital Power, and Transalta) to expedite the transition caused by the closure of six coal-fired power plants. The compensation was derived from the carbon tax and was to be paid over a period of 14 years.

In 2017, the Notley government resumed addressing the proliferation of abandoned wells by budgeting $235 million for the Orphan Well Association to begin land reclamation and rehabilitation of thousands of orphan wells in the province.

A partnership between the provincial government, the Tallcree First Nation, and conservation group 'Nature Conservatory of Canada' created the 3,330 km^{2} (1,290 mi^{2}) Birch River Wildland Provincial Park adjacent to the south of Wood Buffalo National Park. The park is the largest territory of protected boreal forest in the world. Syncrude contributed $2.3 million to the project.

=== Public health and welfare reforms ===
The NDP made revisions reforms and implemented new services to public health and well-being services. In 2018, the NDP proposed legislature Bill 9 to enforce 50 metre buffer zones around abortion clinics in Alberta to ban harassment by pro-life activists against users and personnel of these facilities.

Coverage for the abortion drug 'Mifegymiso' was made public in 2018.

Notley's government enacted campaign promised pilot project to fund $25/day per child into 18 Early Learning Child Care services (ELCC) for daycare services. After a successful pilot project, in 2018 the NDP continued to expand the Daycare services by increasing capacity for 6,000 additional children and 100 additional ELCC centers. The expansion was made possible by a funding grant from the Federal government investing $136 million over 3 years as well from the Albertan government investing $14.5 million.

Albertans with a higher risk of HIV will be provided coverage for the Anti-HIV drug PrEP.

The proposed Bill 24 designed to protect LGBTQ rights will uphold anonymity among members of gay–straight alliance (GSA) clubs in public schools. Additionally gay conversion therapies will be banned in Alberta.

In 2019, Bill 26 was enacted which aims to combat poverty for Albertans suffering from poverty. Among the provisions are an increase of benefits for the elderly and AISH recipients connected to the consumer price index.

=== Economy and labour ===
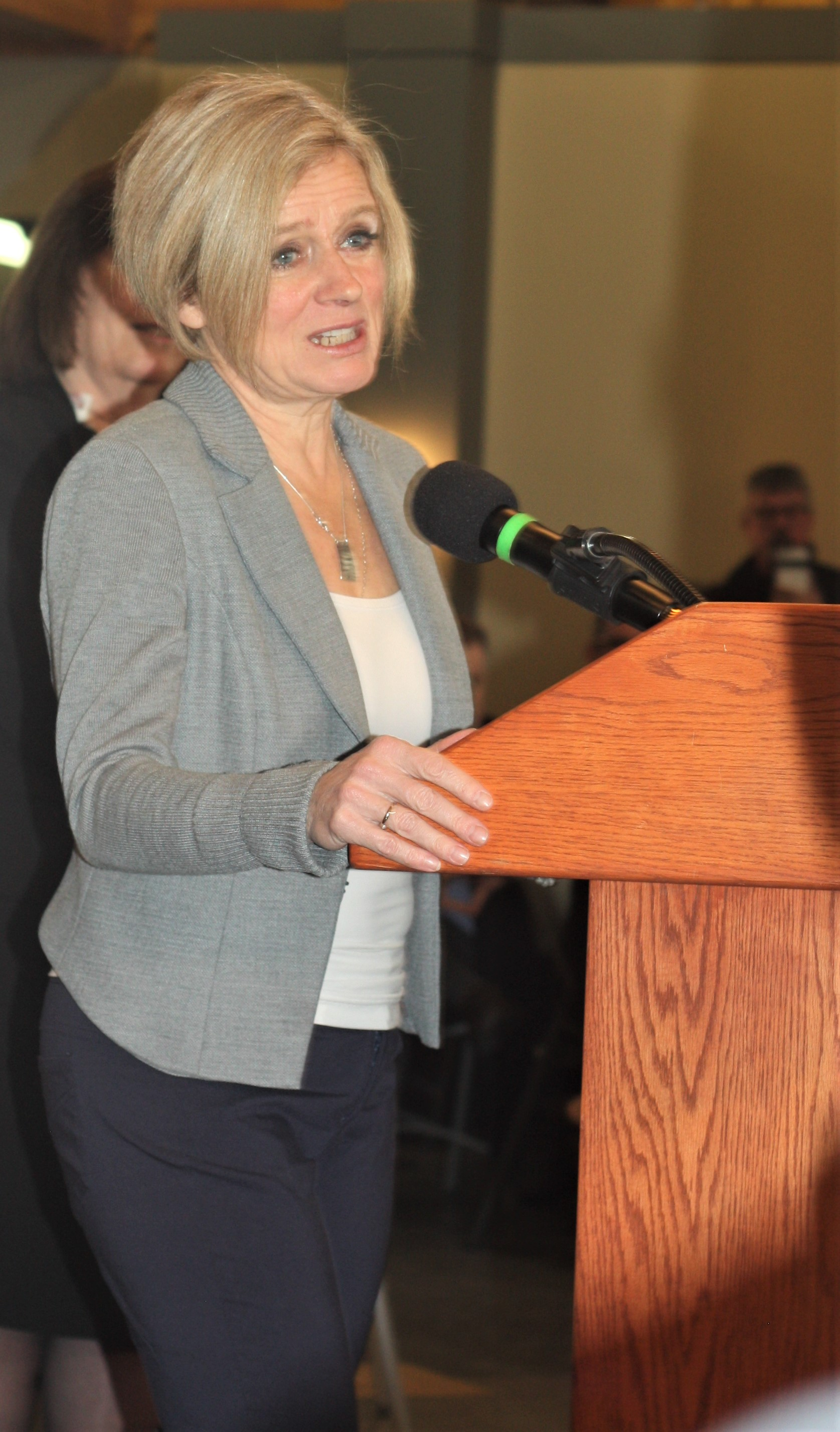
Notley in 2018

Alberta's minimum wage was raised incrementally from $10.20 an hour in 2015 to $15.00 an hour in 2018.

Notley's government revised labour regulations with the implementation of the 'Fair and Family-friendly Act' (Bill 17), which came into effect in 2018. The revisions were the first overhaul of Alberta's labour laws in three decades.

In early 2018, an inter-provincial trade dispute between the BC NDP and Alberta NDP hampered the export of resources. Alberta's AGLC ceased to export wine produced in BC. Notley's government chose this as retaliation for BC premier John Horgan's government decision to limit export of Bitumen from Alberta as protest to ongoing discussion of the proposed Trans Mountain Pipeline expansion. In 2017, Alberta imported $72 million of BC wine. However hospitality service businesses in Alberta worried their industry could be harmed with a prolonged embargo.

The government's Bill 31 of 2017 'A Better Deal for Consumers and Businesses Act' enacted a number of reforms to enhance consumer protections.

In 2019, the Albertan government agreed to lease 4,400 oil cars from Canadian Pacific Railway and Canadian National Railway.

On December 2, 2018, Notely announced the Alberta government would be instating oil production curtailments. The curtailments were meant to minimize lost revenue due to oil being sold at a lower market value as a bottleneck in transportation. The Alberta government rarely utilized this power, the last time was during the National Energy Program to limit federal revenues. Curtailments took effect in January 2019, under the Oil and Gas Conservation Act with the Alberta Energy Regulator monitoring the program.

=== Education ===
In 2015, Notley's government froze tuition fees for post-secondary students. The freeze was initially meant to last two years, but it was extended until 2018. The NDP government also reversed a 1.4 per cent cut to post-secondary institutions and instead increased base funding by two per cent.

In 2016, to fulfill her campaign promise, Notley's government implemented a pilot program aimed at providing Alberta's neediest children with nutritious sustenance lunch programs.

=== Fort McMurray wildfire ===
In 2016, a wildfire devastated Fort McMurray. In October 2016 Notley visited the construction site of the first rebuilt house. She rededicated an overpass crossing Highway 63, where first responders had welcomed residents home, as 'Responders Way Bridge'.

=== Threats against Notley ===
After becoming Premier, Notley started to encounter abuse from Albertans who did not align with her values. As stated by the Edmonton Sun, "The statistics show that from 2003 to 2015, Alberta Sheriffs recorded 55 security incidents involving six premiers. 19 of those came in the last half of 2015, which happened to be Notley's first months in office. At least three of those incidents required police intervention."

Most of the threats against Notley proliferated online with photos and posts, encouraging violence against the premier. According to statistics in 2016 from Alberta Justice, Notley is the Alberta premier with the most death threats. She was the subject of 412 harassment communiques, of which 26 were investigated by law enforcement.

Most of these threats had been attributed to the NDP government's farm safety legislation, Bill 6, which made Worker Compensation Board coverage mandatory on Alberta farms with paid, non-family employees, leading to thousands of protesters.

Official Opposition leader and Wildrose Party Leader Brian Jean, despite criticizing Bill 6, made a call for the abuse directed at Notley to cease or else he would alert authorities. In late August 2016, Jean joked "I've been beating this drum for 10, 11 years. I will continue to beat it, I promise. But it's against the law to beat Rachel Notley", for which he apologized immediately for what he called "an inappropriate attempt at humour."

=== 2019 election ===
Following Notley's win in the 2015 provincial election, the Opposition Wildrose Party and third-place Progressive Conservative Association of Alberta, both right-of-centre, began contemplating forming a united right-wing party. Following referendums in both parties, they merged in 2017 into the United Conservative Party (UCP), with former federal minister and former PC leader Jason Kenney elected as leader later that year.

In the 2019 provincial election, the UCP won a majority of seats and about 55% of the popular vote. While the NDP retained all but one of their seats in Edmonton, significant losses in Calgary and rural Alberta reduced them to Official Opposition status. Notley pledged on election night to continue serving as Leader of the Opposition. The NDP government's defeat was the first time a governing party in Alberta had been defeated after a single term in office. The NDP opposition caucus with 24 seats was the largest in Alberta since Laurence Decore's Liberals won 32 seats in 1993.

== Opposition leader (2019–2024) ==
In December 2019, Notley announced that she intended to lead the Alberta NDP into the next general election held in May 2023. Initially, the Kenney government enjoyed substantial support among Albertans, but his approval rating started to decline with the onset of the COVID-19 pandemic in Alberta. As a result, the NDP maintained a lead in opinion polls prior to the start of the election campaign. During the campaign, the NDP received endorsements from former Progressive Conservative ministers, former Calgary mayor Naheed Nenshi, and former Liberal Party of Alberta leader David Swann. In the election, the NDP grew its caucus size from 24 to 38 MLAs but was defeated by the UCP, now led by Danielle Smith. The NDP caucus formed the largest official opposition in Alberta history, beating their record from the 2019 election.

On January 16, 2024, Notley announced plans to step down as leader of the Alberta NDP. She remained party leader until a successor was elected on June 22. Notley was succeeded as leader of the Alberta NDP by Naheed Nenshi on June 22, 2024. She resigned from the legislature effective December 30, 2024, and retired from politics.

== Post–political career ==
Notley joined former premier Jason Kenney to campaign for remain in the 2026 Alberta independence referendum.

== Election results ==
=== 2023 general election ===
2023 Alberta general election: Edmonton-Strathcona
Party	Candidate	Votes	%	±%
New Democratic	Rachel Notley	13,980	79.73	+7.63
United Conservative	Emad El-Zein	3,032	17.29	+0.25
Green	Robert Gooding-Townsend	324	1.85	+0.74
Buffalo	Andrew Jacobson	106	0.60	–
Wildrose Loyalty Coalition	Robert Nielsen	93	0.53	–
Total		17,535	98.56	–
Rejected and declined		257	1.44	+0.53
Turnout		17,792	59.62	-5.40
Eligible voters		29,841		
New Democratic hold		Swing		+3.69
Source(s) Source: Elections Alberta

=== 2019 general election ===
2019 Alberta general election: Edmonton-Strathcona
Party	Candidate	Votes	%	±%
New Democratic	Rachel Notley	14,724	72.10	−8.79
United Conservative	Kulshan Gill	3,481	17.05	+2.56 (Note: Change from combined Progressive Conservative and Wildrose)
Alberta Party	Prem Pal	1,139	5.58	+5.35
Progressive Conservative	Gary Horan	297	1.45	−12.41
Liberal	Samantha Hees	239	1.17	−3.11
Green	Stuart Andrews	227	1.11	+1.08
Alberta Independence	Ian Smythe	86	0.42	–
Alberta Advantage	Don Edward Meister	62	0.30	–
Communist	Naomi J. Rankin	61	0.30	–
Wildrose	Dale Doan	57	0.28	-0.35
Independent	Gord McLean	49	0.24	–
Total valid ballots cast		20,422	99.09	–
Rejected, spoiled and declined		188	0.91	
Turnout		20,610	65.03	
Eligible voters		31,695		
New Democratic hold		Swing		−5.67
Source(s) Source: "44 - Edmonton-Strathcona, 2019 Alberta general election". officialresults.elections.ab.ca. Elections Alberta.

=== 2015 general election ===
2015 Alberta general election: Edmonton-Strathcona
Party	Candidate	Votes	%	±%
New Democratic	Rachel Notley	13,592	82.42	+19.84
Progressive Conservative	Shelley Wegner	2,242	13.59	−6.43
Liberal	Steve Kochan	658	3.99	−0.43
Total		16,492	98.86	–
Rejected, spoiled and declined		191	1.14	+0.08
Turnout		16,683	50.59	-4.03
Eligible voters		32,976		
New Democratic hold		Swing		+13.13
Source(s) Source: "45 - Edmonton-Strathcona, 2015 Alberta general election". officialresults.elections.ab.ca. Elections Alberta.

=== 2012 general election ===
2012 Alberta general election: Edmonton-Strathcona
Party	Candidate	Votes	%	±%
New Democratic	Rachel Notley	9,496	62.58	+13.25
Progressive Conservative	Emerson Mayers	3,038	20.02	−5.48
Wildrose	Meagen LaFave	1,788	11.78	–
Liberal	Ed Ramsden	670	4.42	−16.22
Evergreen	Terry Noel	183	1.21	−3.34
Total		15,175	98.94	–
Rejected, spoiled and declined		163	1.06	+0.40
Turnout		15,338	54.62	+19.38
Eligible voters		28,079		
New Democratic hold		Swing		+9.37
Source(s) Source: "45 – Edmonton-Strathcona, 2012 Alberta general election". officialresults.elections.ab.ca. Elections Alberta.

=== 2008 general election ===
2008 Alberta general election: Edmonton-Strathcona
Party	Candidate	Votes	%	±%
New Democratic	Rachel Notley	5,862	49.32	−11.33
Progressive Conservative	T.J. Keil	3,031	25.50	+7.09
Liberal	Tim Vant	2,452	20.63	+5.56
Green	Adrian Cole	540	4.54	+2.20
Total		11,885	99.34	–
Rejected, spoiled and declined		79	0.66	-0.06
Turnout		11,964	35.25	-14.66
Eligible voters		33,943		
New Democratic hold		Swing		−9.21
Source(s) Source: "41 – Edmonton-Strathcona, 2008 Alberta general election". officialresults.elections.ab.ca. Elections Alberta. The Report on the March 3, 2008 Provincial General Election of the Twenty-seventh Legislative Assembly. Elections Alberta. pp. 336–339.

Legislative Assembly of Alberta
Preceded by Brian Mason	Dean of the Legislative Assembly of Alberta; April 16, 2019 – December 30, 2024	Succeeded by David Eggen
