= Jason Luan =

Canadian politician (born 1963)

The Honourable Jason Luan ECA MLA

Member of the Legislative Assembly of Alberta for Calgary-Foothills
- In office April 16, 2019 – May 29, 2023
- Appointed by: Danielle Smith
- Preceded by: Prasad Panda
- Succeeded by: Court Ellingson

Member of the Legislative Assembly of Alberta for Calgary-Hawkwood
- In office April 23, 2012 – May 5, 2015
- Preceded by: Riding Established
- Succeeded by: Michael Connolly

Personal details
- Born: April 23, 1963 (age 63) China
- Party: United Conservative Party
- Spouse: Fengying Zhang
- Children: 2
- Education: University of Calgary
- Profession: Social Worker
- Website: https://www.jasonluan.ca

Jason Luan (born April 23, 1963) is a Canadian politician who represented the electoral district of Calgary-Foothills from 2019 to 2023. He also represented Calgary-Hawkwood from 2012 to 2015. While in office, Luan served several cabinet positions, including Associate Minister of Mental Health and Addiction, Minister for Community and Social Services, and Minister of Culture.

== Background ==
Luan was born April 23, 1963. In 1990, he earned a master's degree in social work from the University of Calgary. Before serving as an MLA, he managed funding for nonprofit social service agencies for over 20 years.

Luan co-chaired the Immigrant Sector Council of Calgary from 2006 to 2012 and served on the Calgary Council on Mental Health and Addictions from 2017 to 2018.

== Political career ==
Luan was first elected in the 2012 Alberta general election to represent the riding of Calgary-Hawkwood in the 28th Alberta Legislature. In the 2015 Alberta general election, he lost the seat to NDP candidate, former MLA Michael Connolly.

In the 2019 Alberta general election, Luan won the riding of Calgary-Foothills, winning 57 per cent of the vote. He was appointed Associate Minister of Mental Health and Addiction. During that time, he announced details on $8 million in new funds to help more Albertans access opioid treatment. Luan opposed the NDP's "one-pillar approach" to harm reduction. He and the government promoted a more "comprehensive" treatment and recovery-oriented approach when it comes to drug use and addiction.

Luan was appointed Minister for Community and Social Services on July 8, 2021, in the cabinet of Jason Kenney. After Kenney stepped down as UCP leader, the newly elected UCP leader, Danielle Smith, appointed Luan as Minister of Culture on October 24, 2022.

Luan ran re-election in the 2023 election, but lost his seat to Court Ellingson from the NDP.

== Personal life ==
Luan and his wife, Fengying Zhang, have two daughters.

== Awards and recognition ==
In 2012, Luan received the Queen’s Diamond Jubilee Medal for community services.

== Electoral history ==
2012 Alberta general election: Calgary-Hawkwood
Party	Candidate	Votes	%	±%
Progressive Conservative	Jason Luan	9,097	47.10%	–
Wildrose	David Yager	7,030	36.40%	–
Liberal	Maria Davis	1,632	8.45%	–
New Democratic	Collin Anderson	911	4.72%	–
Alberta Party	Kevin Woron	242	1.25%	–
Evergreen	Janet Keeping	199	1.03%	–
Social Credit	Len Skowronski	103	0.53%	–
Independent	Ed Torrance	99	0.51%	–
Total		19,313	–	–
Rejected, spoiled and declined		138	–	–
Eligible electors / turnout		33,663	57.78%	–
Progressive Conservative pickup new district.				
Source(s) Source: "15 - Calgary-Hawkwood Official Results 2012 Alberta general election". officialresults.elections.ab.ca. Elections Alberta.

2015 Alberta general election: Calgary-Hawkwood
Party	Candidate	Votes	%	±%
New Democratic	Michael Connolly	7,443	36.35%	31.63%
Progressive Conservative	Jason Luan	6,378	31.15%	-15.95%
Wildrose	Jae Shim	4,448	21.72%	-14.68%
Alberta Party	Beth Barberree	925	4.52%	3.26%
Liberal	Harbaksh Singh Sekhon	736	3.59%	-4.86%
Green	Polly Knowlton Cockett	455	2.22%	1.19%
Social Credit	Len Skowronski	90	0.44%	-0.09%
Total		20,475	–	–
Rejected, spoiled and declined		68	–	–
Eligible electors / turnout		33,523	61.28%	3.50%
New Democratic gain from Progressive Conservative		Swing		-2.75%
Source(s) Source: "15 - Calgary-Hawkwood Official Results 2015 Alberta general election". officialresults.elections.ab.ca. Elections Alberta.

2019 Alberta general election: Calgary-Foothills
Party	Candidate	Votes	%	±%	Expenditures
United Conservative	Jason Luan	12,277	56.99%	-2.93%	$92,648
New Democratic	Sameena Arif	6,985	32.42%	6.72%	$15,707
Alberta Party	Jennifer Wyness	1,680	7.80%	2.97%	$6,082
Liberal	Andrea Joyce	379	1.76%	-4.46%	$500
Freedom Conservative	Kari Pomerleau	142	0.66%	–	$1,802
Alberta Independence	Kyle Miller	80	0.37%	–	$514
Total		21,543	–	–	
Rejected, spoiled and declined		125	46	8	
Eligible electors / turnout		32,774	66.14%		
United Conservative hold		Swing			
Source(s) Source: Elections Alberta Note: Expenses is the sum of "Election Expenses", "Other Expenses" and "Transfers Issued". The Elections Act limits "Election Expenses" to $50,000.

2023 Alberta general election: Calgary-Foothills
Party	Candidate	Votes	%	±%
New Democratic	Court Ellingson	11,054	49.92	+17.50
United Conservative	Jason Luan	10,793	48.74	-8.24
Independent	Keenan Demontigny	190	0.86	–
Solidarity Movement	Kami Dass	105	0.47	–
Total		22,142	99.27	–
Rejected and declined		162	0.73	
Turnout		22,304	61.95	
Eligible voters		36,006		
New Democratic gain from United Conservative		Swing		+12.87
Source(s) Source: Elections Alberta

Enter ministry number
Cabinet post (1)
Predecessor	Office	Successor
Leela Aheer	Minister of Culture; October 24, 2022–Present	Incumbent
