= Calgary-Hawkwood =

Defunct provincial electoral district in Alberta, Canada

Alberta electoral district
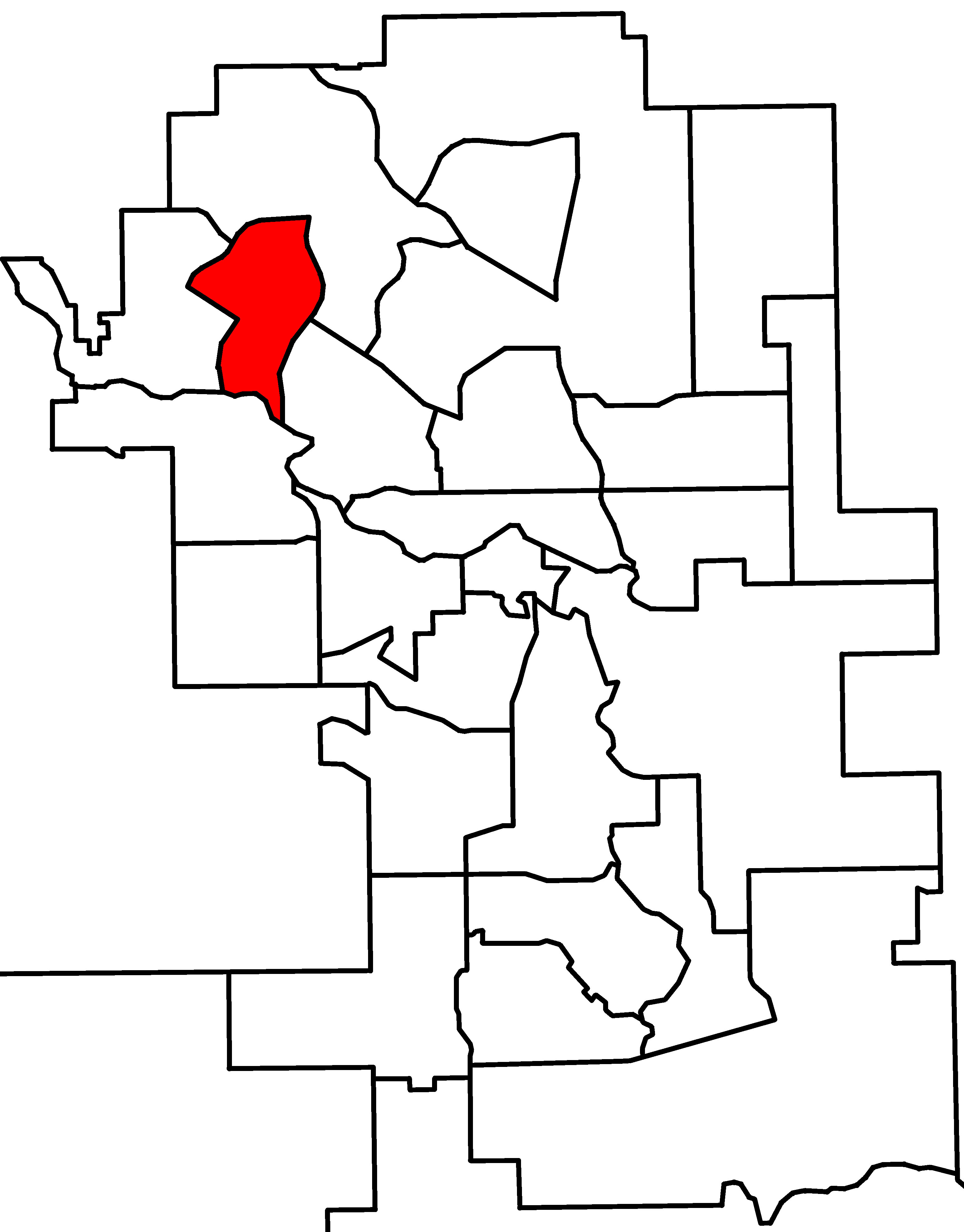
- 2010 boundaries

Defunct provincial electoral district
- Legislature: Legislative Assembly of Alberta
- District created: 2010
- District abolished: 2019
- First contested: 2012
- Last contested: 2015

Calgary-Hawkwood was a provincial electoral district in Calgary, Alberta, Canada, mandated to return a single member to the Legislative Assembly of Alberta using the first past the post method of voting from 2012 to 2019.

== History ==
The Calgary-Hawkwood electoral district was created in the 2010 Alberta boundary re-distribution. It was created from parts of Calgary-Bow, Calgary-Foothills, Calgary-North West and a small portion of Calgary-Varsity.

The Calgary-Hawkwood electoral district was dissolved in the 2017 electoral boundary re-distribution into Calgary-Edgemont ahead of the 2019 Alberta general election.

=== Boundary history ===
15 Calgary-Hawkwood 2010 boundaries
Bordering districts
North	East	West	South
Calgary-Foothills	Calgary-Varsity	Calgary-North West	Calgary-Bow
Legal description from the Statutes of Alberta 2010, Electoral Divisions Act

=== Electoral history ===
Members of the Legislative Assembly for Calgary-Hawkwood
Assembly	Years	Member	Party
See Calgary-Bow and Calgary-Foothills 1971–2012, and Calgary-North West 1986–2012
28th	2012–2015	Jason Luan	PC
29th	2015–2019	Michael Connolly	NDP
See Calgary-Edgemont 2019–

The antecedent electoral districts that comprise Calgary-Hawkwood have been returning mainly Progressive Conservative and the occasional Liberal candidates to office since the 1970s. Varsity has returned a Liberal candidate since 2004 and North West returned a Liberal candidate from 1989 to 1997.

== Legislative election results ==
=== 2012 ===
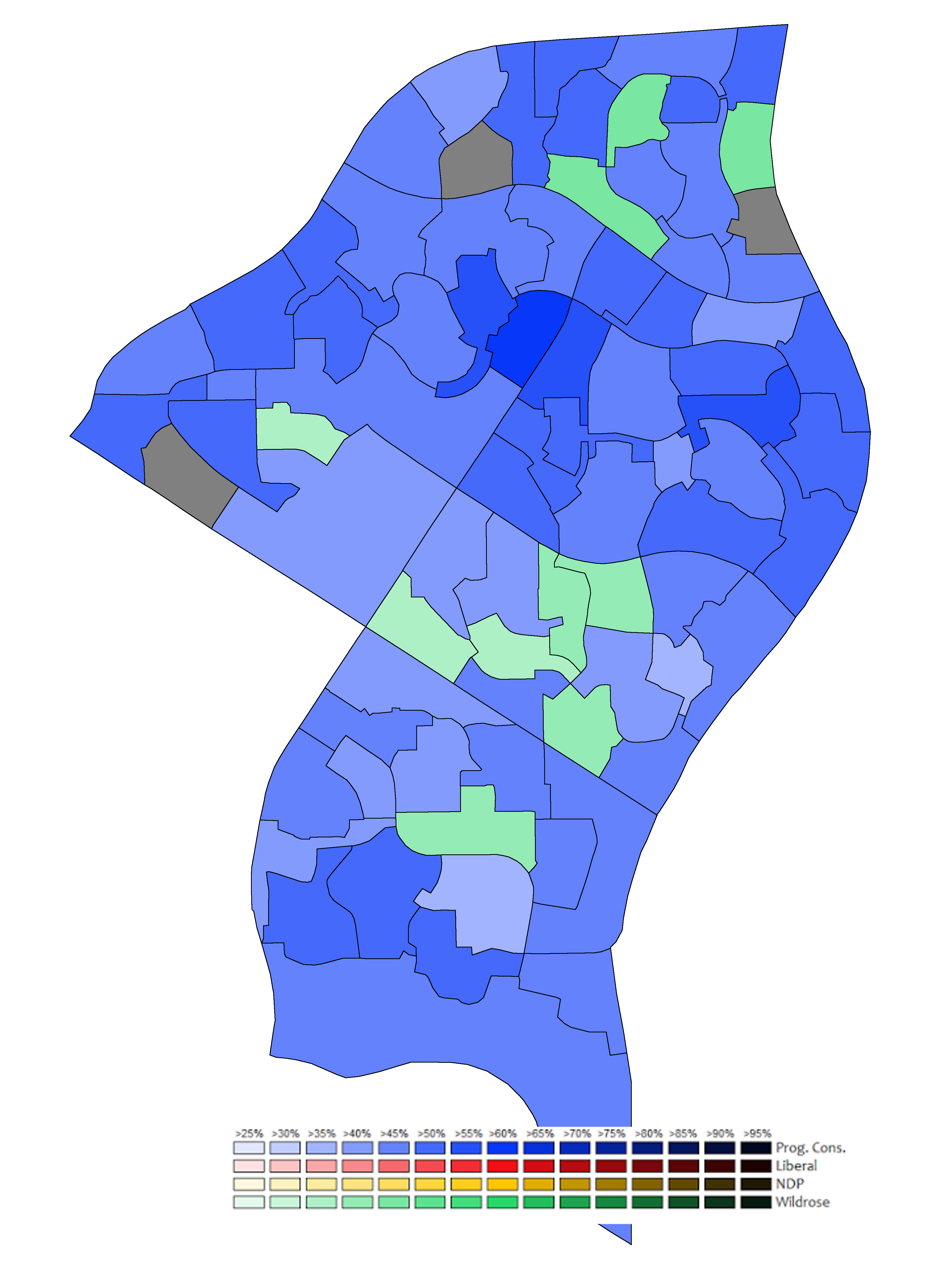
Results by polling division, 2012

2012 Alberta general election
Party	Candidate	Votes	%	±%
Progressive Conservative	Jason Luan	9,097	47.10%	–
Wildrose	David Yager	7,030	36.40%	–
Liberal	Maria Davis	1,632	8.45%	–
New Democratic	Collin Anderson	911	4.72%	–
Alberta Party	Kevin Woron	242	1.25%	–
Evergreen	Janet Keeping	199	1.03%	–
Social Credit	Len Skowronski	103	0.53%	–
Independent	Ed Torrance	99	0.51%	–
Total		19,313	–	–
Rejected, spoiled and declined		138	–	–
Eligible electors / turnout		33,663	57.78%	–
Progressive Conservative pickup new district.				
Source(s) Source: "15 - Calgary-Hawkwood Official Results 2012 Alberta general election". officialresults.elections.ab.ca. Elections Alberta.

=== 2015 ===
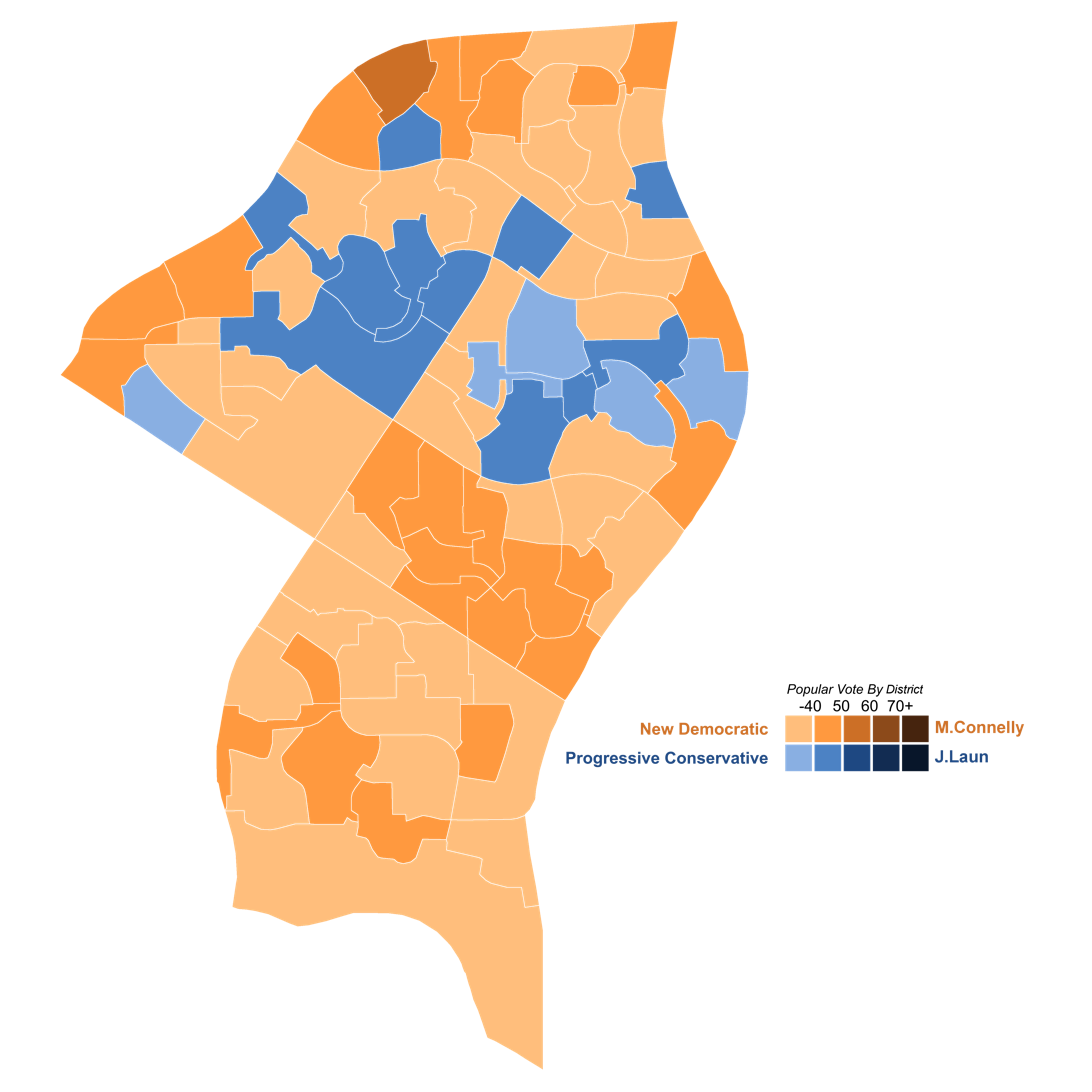
Results by polling division, 2015

2015 Alberta general election
Party	Candidate	Votes	%	±%
New Democratic	Michael Connolly	7,443	36.35%	31.63%
Progressive Conservative	Jason Luan	6,378	31.15%	-15.95%
Wildrose	Jae Shim	4,448	21.72%	-14.68%
Alberta Party	Beth Barberree	925	4.52%	3.26%
Liberal	Harbaksh Singh Sekhon	736	3.59%	-4.86%
Green	Polly Knowlton Cockett	455	2.22%	1.19%
Social Credit	Len Skowronski	90	0.44%	-0.09%
Total		20,475	–	–
Rejected, spoiled and declined		68	–	–
Eligible electors / turnout		33,523	61.28%	3.50%
New Democratic gain from Progressive Conservative		Swing		-2.75%
Source(s) Source: "15 - Calgary-Hawkwood Official Results 2015 Alberta general election". officialresults.elections.ab.ca. Elections Alberta.

== Student vote results ==
=== 2012 ===
2012 Alberta student vote results
Affiliation	Candidate	Votes	%
Progressive Conservative	Jason Luan	186	43.36%
Wildrose	David Yager	129	30.00%
Liberal	Maria Davis	53	12.44%
Alberta Party	Kevin Woron	16	3.72%
New Democratic	Collin Anderson	15	3.49%
Independent	Ed Torrance	9	2.09%
Social Credit	Len Skowronski	3	0.70%
Total		430	100%

== See also ==
- List of Alberta provincial electoral districts
- Canadian provincial electoral districts
