= Alana DeLong =

Canadian politician

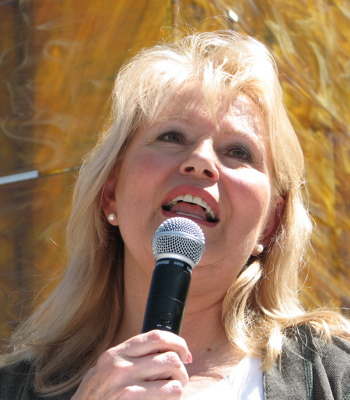

Member of the Legislative Assembly of Alberta for Calgary-Bow
- In office March 15, 2001 – May 5, 2015
- Preceded by: Bonnie Laing
- Succeeded by: Deborah Drever

Personal details
- Born: Alana Suzanne DeLong; 1948 or 1949 (age 77–78) Nelson, British Columbia
- Party: Conservative
- Other political affiliations: Alberta PC; BC Liberal
- Spouse: Robert Spencer
- Education: University of British Columbia; University of Calgary
- Website: http://www.alanadelong.ca

Alana Suzanne DeLong (born c. 1949) is a Canadian politician who was the candidate for the Conservative Party of Canada in the Cowichan-Malahat-Langford federal riding in the 2019 general election. She is a former member of the Legislative Assembly of Alberta who represented the constituency of Calgary-Bow as a Progressive Conservative. She was first elected in 2001 and reelected in the 2004, 2008, and 2012 Alberta provincial elections. Alana DeLong did not run in 2015 general election.

== Early life ==
DeLong was born in Nelson, British Columbia. She graduated from the University of British Columbia in 1970 with a Bachelor of Science degree in mathematics (honours) with a drama minor before going on to complete courses toward a Master of Computer Science degree at the University of Calgary. With more than 20 years experience in the information technology industry, DeLong has worked with many leading computer companies in Calgary including Barry W. Ramer & Partners Ltd. Canada's largest IBM PC VAR where she served as a leading Marketing Representative, Sterlingrock Systems Incorporated where she served as president and Sperry Univac where she worked as their first female computer mainframe salesperson. DeLong also holds the distinction of being the first female marketing manager with General Electric in Canada.

DeLong has long been an active community member. She served as president of Tuesday Nooners Toastmasters and extensively campaigned for the Cancer Fund, the Heart and Stroke Fund, the Canadian Red Cross Society, Flowers of Hope, and a number of municipal, provincial, and federal elections. DeLong has also drawn on her background in drama as an actress with Theatre Calgary, host of a television ski program, and singer with the Calgary Opera Chorus.

== Political life ==
DeLong first sought public office in the 2001 provincial election in the constituency of Calgary-Bow. In that election, DeLong received 64% of the vote. She was subsequently reelected in 2004 with a share of 48% and again in 2008 when she earned 45% of the vote.

During the same-sex marriage debate in December 2004, DeLong joined the majority of Progressive Conservative caucus in speaking against same sex marriage rights and supported a legal challenge following Reference Re Same-Sex Marriage and the introduction of Bill C-38 by the Government of Canada.

DeLong intended to run as a candidate in the 2006 Progressive Conservative Leadership convention but decided against seeking the position prior to the nomination deadline. Up until the point of her departure from the race, she was the only female seeking the leadership.

In addition to her role as an MLA, DeLong has been a member of a number of committees. She has served in the role of chair of the Standing Committee on Private Bills, the Nomination Review Committee of the Ministers Seniors Service Awards, and of the Information and Communications Technology (ICT) and SuperNet Committee, as well as the position of vice-chair of the Official Song Committee. DeLong has also served on the Regulatory Review Steering Committee, the Provincial Archives of Alberta Advisory Board, the Cabinet Policy Committee on Government Services, the Standing Committee on Public Accounts Committee, the Standing Policy Committee on Justice and Government Services, and the Standing Policy Committee on Law and Regulations and Public Accounts. As well, she has served as a member of a number of MLA Review Committees, including the MLA Committee to Review the Assured Income for the Severely Handicapped (AISH) Program, the MLA Committee to Review Low-Income Programs in Alberta, the MLA Committee to Review Marketing Tourism, the MLA Committee to Review Freedom of Information Practices, and the MLA Committee to Review the Select Conflicts of Interest Act.

DeLong served as a member of the Cabinet Policy Committee on Community Services, the Standing Committee on Privileges and Elections, Standing Orders and Printing, and the Standing Committee on the Alberta Heritage Savings Trust Fund. She also serves as co-chair of the Alberta Life Sciences Institute (ALSI) Board.

== Personal life ==
DeLong is married to Robert Spencer. She has two grown children, Samantha and James. She lived in the community of Bowness for more than 30 years and designed the log home she lives in with her family. DeLong returned to her native home of British Columbia in April 2015 and now lives on Thetis Island in the Southern Gulf Islands.

== Electoral record ==
2021 Canadian federal election: Cowichan—Malahat—Langford
Party	Candidate	Votes	%	±%	Expenditures
New Democratic	Alistair MacGregor	26,968	42.78	+6.73	$49,798.01
Conservative	Alana DeLong	17,870	28.35	+2.35	$51,680.34
Liberal	Blair Herbert	10,320	16.37	+0.58	$28,769.73
People's	Mark Hecht	3,952	6.27	+4.64	$13,032.24
Green	Lia Versaevel	3,922	6.22	–13.99	$6,881.80
Total valid votes/expense limit		63,032	99.52	–	$125,299.84
Total rejected ballots		306	0.48	+0.05	
Turnout		63,338	63.96	–5.92	
Eligible voters		99,024			
New Democratic hold		Swing			
Source: Elections Canada

2019 Canadian federal election: Cowichan—Malahat—Langford
Party	Candidate	Votes	%	±%	Expenditures
New Democratic	Alistair MacGregor	23,519	36.06	+0.12	$85,558.94
Conservative	Alana DeLong	16,959	26.00	+3.19	$45,957.36
Green	Lydia Hwitsum	13,181	20.21	+3.27	$58,460.55
Liberal	Blair Herbert	10,301	15.79	–7.98	$25,800.21
People's	Rhonda Chen	1,066	1.63	–	$8,389.99
Christian Heritage	Robin Morton Stanbridge	202	0.31	–	$1,993.05
Total valid votes/expense limit		65,228	99.57	–	$117,241.30
Total rejected ballots		282	0.43	+0.06	
Turnout		65,510	69.88	–5.84	
Eligible voters		93,745			
New Democratic hold		Swing		–1.53	
Source: Elections Canada

2017 British Columbia general election: Nanaimo-North Cowichan
Party	Candidate	Votes	%	±%	Expenditures
New Democratic	Doug Routley	12,276	46.89	+0.68	$34,949
Liberal	Alana DeLong	7,379	28.18	−2.59	$36,526
Green	Lia Marie Constance Versaevel	6,252	23.88	+10.15	$7,981
Independent	P. Anna Paddon	274	1.05	+0.77	$1,010
Total valid votes		26,181	100.00	–	
Total rejected ballots		198	0.75	+0.36	
Turnout		26,379	63.73	+2.62	
Registered voters		41,393			
Source: Elections BC

2012 Alberta general election: Calgary-Bow
Party	Candidate	Votes	%	±%
Progressive Conservative	Alana S. DeLong	6,994	47.21%	2.05%
Wildrose	Tim Dyck	5,617	37.91%	28.29%
Liberal	Stephanie Shewchuk	1,369	9.24%	-25.69%
New Democratic	Jason Nishiyama	598	4.04%	0.61%
Alberta Party	Ellen Phillips	237	1.60%	–
Total		14,815	–	–
Rejected, spoiled and declined		72	–	–
Eligible electors / turnout		26,401	56.39%	8.31%
Progressive Conservative hold		Swing		-0.46%
Source(s) Source: "04 - Calgary-Bow, 2012 Alberta general election". officialresults.elections.ab.ca. Elections Alberta.

2008 Alberta general election: Calgary-Bow
Party	Candidate	Votes	%	±%
Progressive Conservative	Alana S. DeLong	6,687	45.16%	-3.04%
Liberal	Greg Flanagan	5,173	34.93%	7.17%
Wildrose Alliance	Barry J. Holizki	1,425	9.62%	1.58%
Green	Randy Weeks	845	5.71%	0.06%
New Democratic	Teale Phelps Bondaroff	507	3.42%	-5.55%
Social Credit	Leonard Skowronski	171	1.15%	0.39%
Total		14,808	–	–
Rejected, spoiled and declined		64	–	–
Eligible electors / turnout		30,930	48.08%	0.94%
Progressive Conservative hold		Swing		-5.11%
Source(s) Source: "02 - Calgary-Bow, 2008 Alberta general election". officialresults.elections.ab.ca. Elections Alberta. The Report on the March 3, 2008 Provincial General Election of the Twenty-seventh Legislative Assembly. Elections Alberta. July 28, 2008. pp. 174–177.

2004 Alberta general election: Calgary-Bow
Party	Candidate	Votes	%	±%
Progressive Conservative	Alana S. DeLong	6,097	48.20%	-15.74%
Liberal	Kelly McDonnell	3,512	27.76%	2.80%
New Democratic	Jennifer Banks	1,135	8.97%	2.34%
Alberta Alliance	James D. Istvanffy	1,017	8.04%	–
Green	Marie Picken	714	5.64%	4.12%
Social Credit	Douglas A. Picken	97	0.77%	–
Independent	Margaret (Peggy) Askin	78	0.62%	-0.81%
Total		12,650	–	–
Rejected, spoiled and declined		90	–	–
Eligible electors / turnout		27,026	47.14%	-8.12%
Progressive Conservative hold		Swing		-9.27%
Source(s) Source: "Calgary-Bow, 2004 Alberta general election" (PDF). Elections Alberta.

2001 Alberta general election: Calgary-Bow
Party	Candidate	Votes	%	±%
Progressive Conservative	Alana S. DeLong	8,274	63.94%	9.51%
Liberal	Kelly McDonnell	3,230	24.96%	-8.45%
New Democratic	Jeff Bayliss	858	6.63%	-2.71%
Greens	Jan Triska	394	3.04%	1.52%
Independent	Margaret (Peggy) Askin	184	1.42%	–
Total		12,940	–	–
Rejected, spoiled and declined		51	–	–
Eligible electors / turnout		23,510	55.26%	-0.70%
Progressive Conservative hold		Swing		8.98%
Source(s) Source: "Calgary-Bow Official Results 2001 Alberta general election" (PDF). Elections Alberta.
