= Michael Connolly (Canadian politician) =

Canadian politician

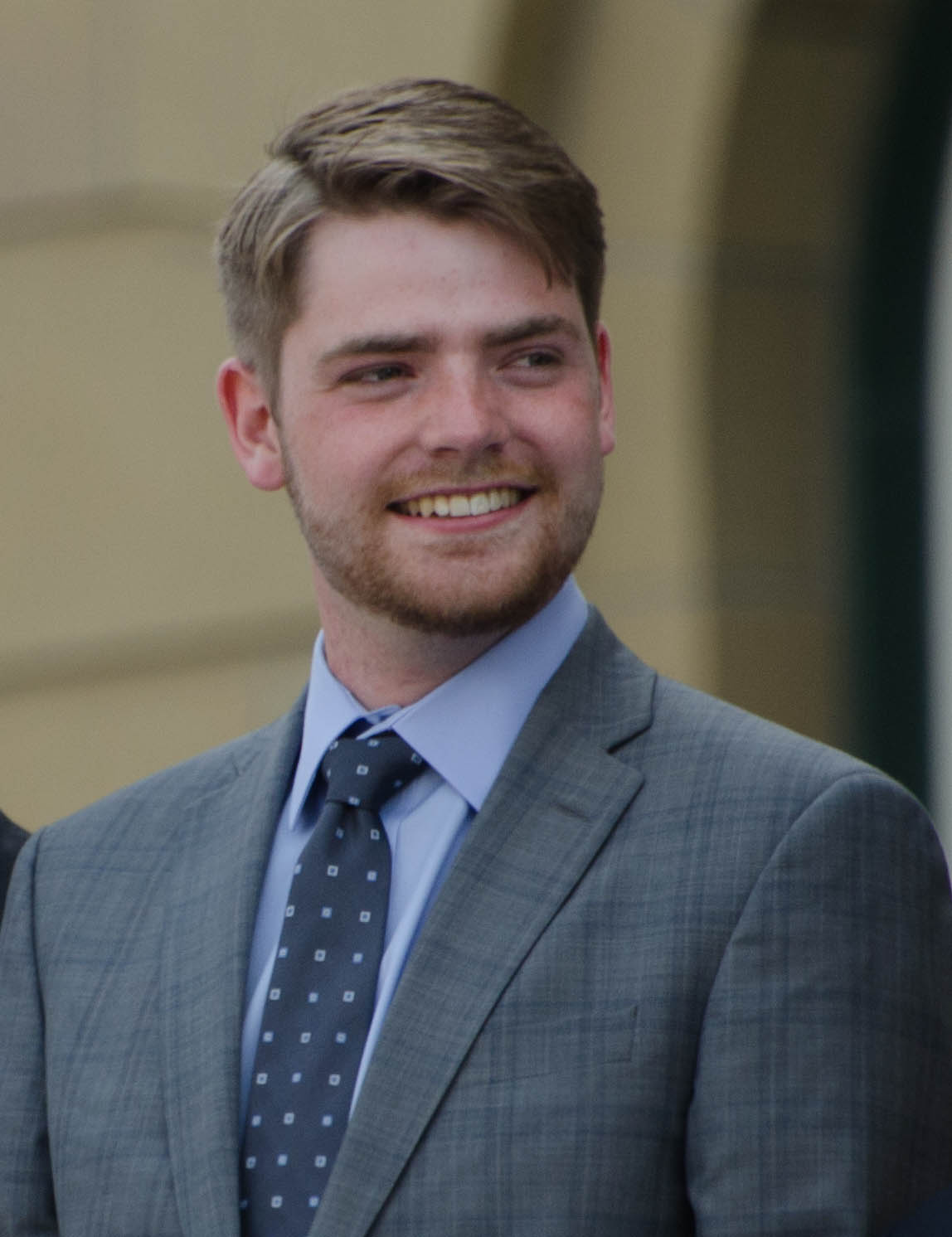
- Connolly in 2015

Member of the Legislative Assembly of Alberta for Calgary-Hawkwood
- In office May 5, 2015 – March 19, 2019
- Preceded by: Jason Luan
- Succeeded by: district abolished

Personal details
- Born: March 3, 1994 (age 32) Calgary, Alberta, Canada
- Party: Alberta New Democratic Party
- Education: University of Ottawa (BA), University of Calgary (MA), Loyola University Chicago
- Occupation: PhD Candidate

Michael Robert Davies Connolly (born March 3, 1994) is a Canadian politician who was an elected member to the Legislative Assembly of Alberta representing the electoral district of Calgary-Hawkwood. Upon election he became the second youngest elected MLA at the age of 21 and one of the first three openly LGBT people elected to the Alberta legislature, alongside caucus colleagues Ricardo Miranda and Estefan Cortes-Vargas.

He served as deputy chair of the Standing Committee on Private Bills and as a member of the Standing Committee on Alberta's Economic Future. He previously served as a member of the Standing Committee on Legislative Offices and the Select Special Ethics and Accountability Committee.

Connolly did not seek reelection in 2019.

Since 2019, Connolly finished a Bachelor of Arts at the University of Ottawa in 2021, a Master of Arts in history at the University of Calgary in 2023, and is currently a PhD candidate at Loyola University Chicago where he studies American history and public history.

== Early career ==
Connolly graduated from Dr. E.P. Scarlett High School in 2012 and began studying history and political science in French immersion at the University of Ottawa (specializing in Scottish politics and nationalism and European integration) that same year. Connolly gained political experience while completing an internship with an office of a Member of Parliament. During this time he helped to organize a forum for young women leaders from all over Canada. He has also worked in the retail and hospitality industries.

Connolly was active in the federal and provincial NDP before this nomination. He was nominated in 2014 as the NDP's candidate for the 2015 federal election in the riding of Calgary Midnapore, but withdrew upon his election to the Legislative Assembly of Alberta.

== Legislative Assembly ==
Connolly was known to be a fiercely outspoken MLA sparring with his counterparts on numerous issues, specifically when it came to Gay-Straight Alliances in the province’s schools, LGBTQ rights, and Francophone rights.

Connolly co-sponsored Bill 2: Supporting Economic and Trade Futures Act, Bill 7: The Alberta Human Rights Amendment Act (which added gender identity and gender expression as expressly prohibited grounds of discrimination into the Alberta Human Rights Act), Bill 12: Preserving Canada’s Economic Prosperity Act, Bill 29: Vital Statistics and Life Events Modernization Act, and Bill 32: An Act to Strengthen and Protect Democracy in Alberta.

Connolly was at the forefront of the debate on Bill 24, An Act to support Gay-Straight Alliances, which he also co-sponsored. During the debate, Connolly drew on his own past to drum up support for the bill and lambasted Jason Kenney and the United Conservative Party when they declared they were going to vote against the Bill. During debate, Connolly stated:

"When we have politicians spewing their hateful, bigoted ideology about LGBTQ+ kids, it only makes matters worse for our youth. The words of Jason Kenney and the members of that side of the house [referring to the UCP] matter to our youth. And the fact they are opposing this based on social conservatism and the hatred for the LGBTQ community is disgusting. The members opposite should be ashamed of themselves."

When Mike Ellis, the UCP MLA for Calgary-West, proposed an amendment that would have effectively neutered the Bill, Connolly proclaimed that it was "deeply disappointing that the members opposite continue to peddle dangerous conspiracy theories instead of accepting the simple fact that this is about protecting kids," and told the UCP that if they couldn’t support the LGBTQ+ community in the legislature they were not welcome at Pride.

In 2016, Connolly was awarded with the Harvey Milk Equality Award at the Harvey Milk Diversity Breakfast in San Diego for his work with the LGBTQ community. In 2018, Connolly was awarded the Georges A. Arès Award for Political Leadership by the Association Canadien-Francais de l'Alberta for his work towards creating and implementing the first French Policy by the government of Alberta.

== Electoral history ==
=== 2015 general election ===
2015 Alberta general election: Calgary-Hawkwood
Party	Candidate	Votes	%	±%
New Democratic	Michael Connolly	7,443	36.35%	31.63%
Progressive Conservative	Jason Luan	6,378	31.15%	-15.95%
Wildrose	Jae Shim	4,448	21.72%	-14.68%
Alberta Party	Beth Barberree	925	4.52%	3.26%
Liberal	Harbaksh Singh Sekhon	736	3.59%	-4.86%
Green	Polly Knowlton Cockett	455	2.22%	1.19%
Social Credit	Len Skowronski	90	0.44%	-0.09%
Total		20,475	–	–
Rejected, spoiled and declined		68	–	–
Eligible electors / turnout		33,523	61.28%	3.50%
New Democratic gain from Progressive Conservative		Swing		-2.75%
Source(s) Source: "15 - Calgary-Hawkwood Official Results 2015 Alberta general election". officialresults.elections.ab.ca. Elections Alberta.
