= Demetrios Nicolaides =

Canadian politician

The Honourable Demetrios Nicolaides ECA MLA
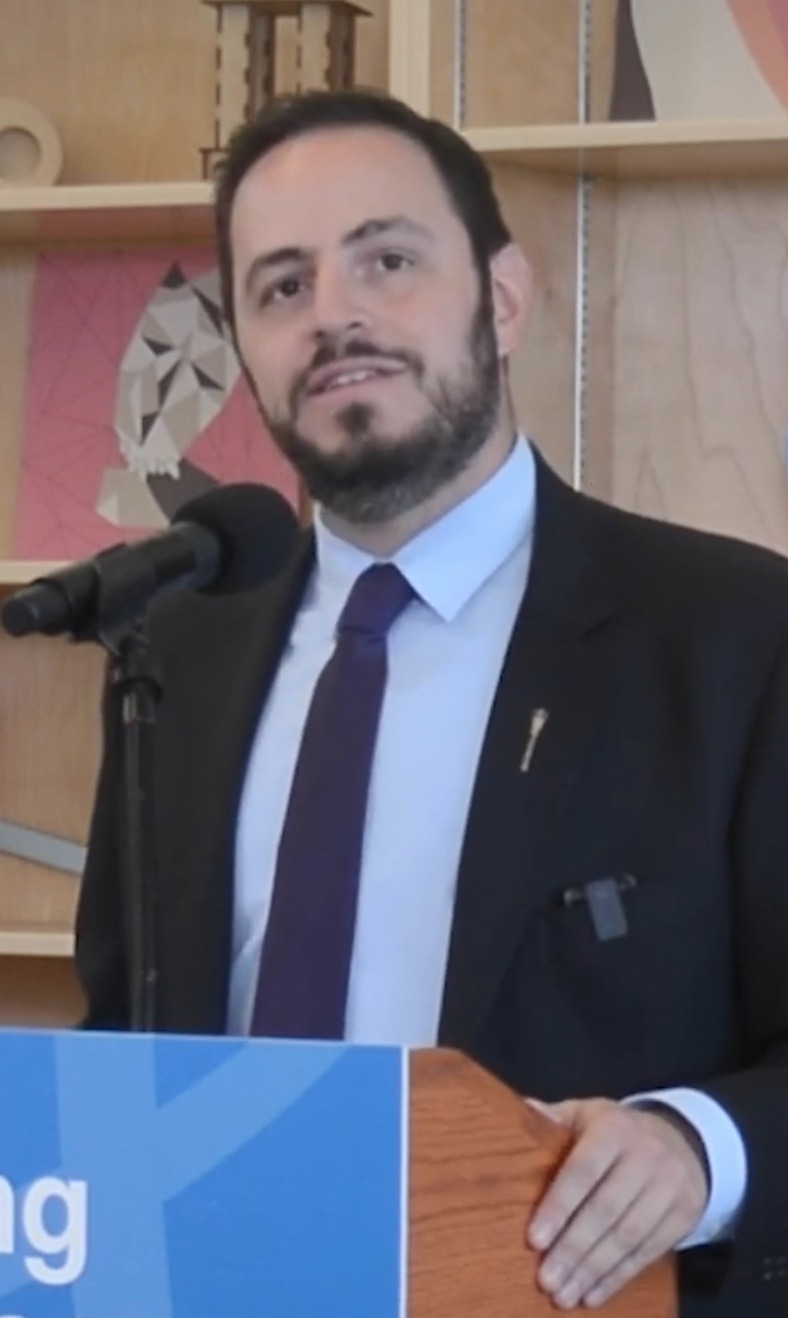

Minister of Education
- Incumbent
- Assumed office June 9, 2023
- Premier: Danielle Smith
- Preceded by: Adriana LaGrange

Alberta Minister of Advanced Education
- In office April 30, 2019 – June 9, 2023
- Premier: Jason Kenney, Danielle Smith
- Preceded by: Marlin Schmidt
- Succeeded by: Rajan Sawhney

Member of the Legislative Assembly of Alberta for Calgary-Bow
- Incumbent
- Assumed office April 16, 2019
- Preceded by: Deborah Drever

Personal details
- Born: August 31, 1982 (age 44) Calgary, Alberta, Canada
- Party: United Conservative Party
- Education: University of Cyprus
- Occupation: Consultant

Demetrios Nicolaides ECA MLA is a Canadian politician who was elected in the 2019 Alberta general election to represent the electoral district of Calgary-Bow in the 30th Alberta Legislature. He is a member of the United Conservative Party. On April 30, 2019, he was appointed to be the Minister of Advanced Education in the Executive Council of Alberta.

He was re-elected in the 2023 Alberta general election.

== Early life and education ==
Nicolaides was born in Calgary. He was elected VP Academic of the University of Calgary's Students’ Union in their 2003 General Election. Nicolaides convocated from the University of Calgary in 2005 with a Bachelor of Arts in History and International Relations. He completed his Master in Peace and Conflict Studies from the European University Centre for Peace and Conflict Studies and his PhD in political science from the University of Cyprus. His PhD focused on the effectiveness of approaches to peace education in protracted ethno-nationalist based conflicts. Other research work includes the Cyprus conflict, Cypriot foreign and defence policy and EU integration politics.

== Career ==
Nicolaides was elected as vice-president communications for PC Alberta at the party's 2016 AGM in Red Deer and served until the successful merger of the party with the Wildrose to form the new United Conservative Party of Alberta. Demetrios squashed attempts to disqualify Jason Kenney's candidacy for leader of the party. Nicolaides volunteered extensively on Jason Kenney's PC leadership campaign, the merger of the Wildrose and PC Alberta, and Jason Kenney's UCP leadership campaign. In 2018, Demetrios sought the UCP nomination in Calgary-Bow and faced off against many challengers including Lisa Davis, who retained Nicolaides as her campaign manager during her 2017 election as a school trustee to the Calgary Board of Education in 2017. Nicolaides successfully secured the nomination against Lisa Davis, Cheryl Durkee, and 2015 PC Alberta candidate Calgary-Bow and 2016 PC Alberta leadership candidate Byron Nelson on October 23, 2018.

=== Post-secondary funding and reform ===
In January 2020, Nicolaides announced that funding for post-secondary institutions would be based on performance against key metrics. Three-year Investment Management Agreements would be signed with individual institutions and each would see 15% of funding at risk in year one, 30% in year two and 40% in year three. The onset of the COVID-19 pandemic prompted the government to delay implementation of the new model. Nicolaides moved forward with a new implantation timeline that would see post-secondary institutions sign a one-year Investment Management Agreement, with 5% of funding at risk against a single metric on work-integrated learning. His office accredited the first for-profit post-secondary institution in Alberta in MaKami College.

=== Supporting the trades ===
As Minister of Advanced Education, Nicolaides prioritized additional support for trades and apprenticeship education. This included establishing a new scholarship for high school students who show promise in the trades. The $1.5 million High School Apprenticeship Scholarship, will help more students access post-secondary educational opportunities in the trades. $10 million in new funding was also provided to Women Building Futures, $6 million per year to CAREERS: The Next Generation and $2 million annually to Skills Canada Alberta. In addition, a taskforce of experts in the trades and apprenticeship education was convened to provide the government with additional recommendations to elevate the trades and promote apprenticeship education pathways. Nicolaides also established the Trades Hall of Fame and introduced Bill 67, the Skilled Trades and Apprenticeship Education Act that overhauled Alberta's trades and apprenticeship legislative and regulatory framework.

=== COVID-19 ===
The onset of the COVID-19 pandemic caused many of Alberta's post-secondary institutions to move to on-learning which continued throughout the majority of the 2020/21 academic year. Nicolaides provided support to Alberta's five First Nations colleges who each received an additional $100,000 in one-time funding for COVID-19 supports. The grant was used to address technology and WiFi access, support online programming development and delivery ad assists with improve cleaning protocols. Additional supports were also provided to unemployed apprentices as eligible apprentices would now receive $500 more during their classroom instruction period to assist apprentices who are unemployed continue their apprenticeship program. In March 2021, citing increasing vaccination rates, Nicolaides issued a statement to post-secondary institutions to prepare to return to in-person learning for the upcoming 2021/22 Fall academic semester. While many institutions indeed returned to in-person learning, the rise of the more infectious Omicron variant prompted many of Alberta's post-secondary institutions to return to on-line learning in October and December. By the spring of 2022, the Omicron variant had abated and the Government of Alberta moved forward with a plan to remove COVID-19 measures. On February 8, 2022, Premier Jason Kenney announced that the proof-of-vaccination program would end at midnight and other COVID-19 measures would be removed by March 1, 2022. Following this announcement Nicolaides directed post-secondary institutions to remove their vaccine and mask requirements by March 1, 2022.

=== Establishing Red Deer Polytechnic and Northwestern Polytechnic ===
In February 2018, Advanced Education Minister Marlin Schmidt announced that Grande Prairie Regional College would transition to a university in order to offer degrees in the local community. In 2019, it was further announced that Red Deer College would also transition to a university. However, in 2021, Nicolaides noted that the two institutions may not transitions to universities as planned as a larger review of Alberta's post-secondary system was underway. In the end, both institutions transitioned to Polytechnics.

=== Targeted enrolment expansion ===
Budget 2022 committed $600 million over three years to address labour shortages through the Alberta at Work initiative. This included $171 million, over three years, to create 10,000 new post-secondary spaces in high-demand programs. Approximately $4 million was provided to Lakeland College, Keyano College and Portage College to create 400 new spaces, $850,000 was provided to Northern Lakes College and Northwestern Polytechnic to create 340 new spaces primarily in health care related programming, $5.3 million was provided to the University of Lethbridge, Lethbridge College and Medicine Hat College to create 184 new spaces, $5.5 million was provided to Red Deer Polytechnic, Burman University and Olds College to create 900 new post-secondary spaces, Edmonton-area post- secondary institutions including the University of Alberta, Concordia University, MacEwan university, NAIT and Norquest collectively received a total of $70 million to create 4,900 new post-secondary spaces in business, engineering, health, IT and early childhood learning and Calgary-area post- secondary institutions received $84.6 million to create 3,000 new spaces in aviation, quantum computing, and healthcare at Ambrose University, Bow Valley College, Mount Royal University, SAIT, St. Mary's University and the University of Calgary. Nicolaides has claimed that the 10,000 new spaces created through targeted enrolment expansion initiative represent the largest targeted seat increase in Alberta history. In addition, Budget 2022 included a $59 million capital investment to the University Of Calgary Faculty Of Veterinary Medicine to double the number of vet grads and $41 million to continue redevelopment of SAIT's John Ware building, home of its award-winning culinary program.

=== 2025 teachers' strike and recall petition ===
An application to recall Nicolaides was given a written notice of approval on October 14, 2025. The petition was issued on October 23, 2025, with a signature collection period that will last from October 23, 2025, to January 21, 2026. In response to his role against the 2025 Alberta teachers' strike, protesters gathered outside of Nicolaides' Calgary office to stand in solidarity with the teachers.

== Electoral history ==
2023 Alberta general election: Calgary-Bow
Party	Candidate	Votes	%	±%
United Conservative	Demetrios Nicolaides	13,175	49.74	-6.15
New Democratic	Druh Farrell	12,552	47.39	+13.23
Alberta Party	Paul Godard	670	2.53	-4.56
Solidarity Movement	Manuel Santos	89	0.34	–
Total		26,486	99.29	–
Rejected and declined		190	0.71	
Turnout		26,676	66.43	
Eligible voters		40,159		
United Conservative hold		Swing		-9.69
Source(s) Source: Elections Alberta

2019 Alberta general election: Calgary-Bow
Party	Candidate	Votes	%	±%	Expenditures
United Conservative	Demetrios Nicolaides	13,987	55.90	+1.89	$75,865
New Democratic	Deborah Drever	8,548	34.16	-1.94	$48,057
Alberta Party	Paul Godard	1,774	7.09	+4.52	$6,206
Liberal	Daniel Ejumabone	320	1.28	-3.45	$500
Green	Marion Westoll	233	0.93	-1.66	$950
Freedom Conservative	Regina Shakirova	161	0.64	–	$500
Total		25,023	99.41	–	
Rejected, spoiled and declined		149	0.59	–	
Turnout		25,172	68.05		
Eligible voters		36,993			
United Conservative notional hold		Swing		+1.92	
Source(s) Source: Elections Alberta Note: Expenses is the sum of "Election Expenses", "Other Expenses" and "Transfers Issued". The Elections Act limits "Election Expenses" to $50,000.

Alberta provincial government of Jason Kenney
Cabinet post (1)
Predecessor	Office	Successor
Marlin Schmidt	Minister of Advanced Education; April 30, 2019–	Incumbent
