= Deborah Drever =

Canadian politician

Member of the Legislative Assembly of Alberta for Calgary-Bow
- In office May 5, 2015 – March 19, 2019
- Preceded by: Alana DeLong
- Succeeded by: Demetrios Nicolaides

Personal details
- Born: August 15, 1988 (age 38) Calgary, Alberta, Canada
- Party: Alberta New Democratic Party (2015, 2016–)
- Other political affiliations: Independent (2015)
- Education: Mount Royal University
- Occupation: student, politician

Deborah Drever (born August 15, 1988) is a Canadian who was a politician elected in the 2015 general election to the Legislative Assembly of Alberta, representing the electoral district of Calgary-Bow. A sociology student at Mount Royal University in Calgary, she defeated Progressive Conservative challenger Byron Nelson in the May 5, 2015, election in a riding that had historically elected Conservative candidates.

She was elected as a member of the Alberta New Democratic Party, but was sworn in as an independent MLA after being barred from the caucus because of a controversy about her social media activities prior to her candidacy. In 2016, she was readmitted to the NDP caucus.

Deborah Drever ran for re-election in the 2019 Alberta general election, but was defeated by Demetrios Nicolaides of the United Conservative Party, as the UCP gained back all but a handful of seats they had lost in the Calgary area in 2015.

== Political career ==
=== Social media controversy ===
Immediately after the 2015 election, Drever was criticized on social media after pictures from her Facebook page were circulated that showed somebody giving the finger to the Canadian flag and Drever posing with a "Magic Weed" (marijuana) tee-shirt. The pictures were later removed from her Facebook account. On May 15, 2015, Drever again attracted controversy when it was discovered that she posed in an assault scene for a music album cover. The image raised concerns among some observers who saw it as promoting sexual violence against women. Petitions were started and a protest was organized, asking Drever to resign.

On May 20, 2015, Premier-designate Rachel Notley announced that she had directed Drever, as a result of the media attention, to create a plan to improve education on violence against women, particularly outreach to groups working with vulnerable young women. Two days later, the NDP announced that Drever had been suspended from caucus after a homophobic remark was found posted from Drever's Instagram account. Notley said that she would review Drever's status within a year.

=== 29th Alberta Legislature ===
Drever wrote a private member's bill designed to protect victims of domestic violence by allowing them to break leases and move out of their rental accommodations early. Her bill was unanimously approved by the legislature in the fall of 2015 and won her accolades from both sides of the legislative assembly. In January 2016, after Premier Notley decided that Drever had exceeded the criteria given to her in order to be readmitted into the government caucus, she was allowed to rejoin the NDP caucus.

== Electoral history ==
=== 2015 general election ===
2015 Alberta general election: Calgary-Bow
Party	Candidate	Votes	%	±%
New Democratic	Deborah Drever	5,669	34.51%	30.47%
Progressive Conservative	Byron Nelson	5,419	32.98%	-14.22%
Wildrose	Trevor Grover	3,752	22.84%	-15.08%
Liberal	Matt Gaiser	682	4.15%	-5.09%
Alberta Party	Jonathon Himann	459	2.79%	1.19%
Green	David Reid	448	2.73%	–
Total		16,429	–	–
Rejected, spoiled and declined		122	–	–
Eligible electors / turnout		31,990	51.74%	-4.65%
New Democratic gain from Progressive Conservative		Swing		-3.89%
Source(s) Source: "04 - Calgary-Bow, 2015 Alberta general election". officialresults.elections.ab.ca. Elections Alberta.

2019 Alberta general election: Calgary-Bow
Party	Candidate	Votes	%	±%	Expenditures
United Conservative	Demetrios Nicolaides	13,987	55.90	+1.89	$75,865
New Democratic	Deborah Drever	8,548	34.16	-1.94	$48,057
Alberta Party	Paul Godard	1,774	7.09	+4.52	$6,206
Liberal	Daniel Ejumabone	320	1.28	-3.45	$500
Green	Marion Westoll	233	0.93	-1.66	$950
Freedom Conservative	Regina Shakirova	161	0.64	–	$500
Total		25,023	99.41	–	
Rejected, spoiled and declined		149	0.59	–	
Turnout		25,172	68.05		
Eligible voters		36,993			
United Conservative notional hold		Swing		+1.92	
Source(s) Source: Elections Alberta Note: Expenses is the sum of "Election Expenses", "Other Expenses" and "Transfers Issued". The Elections Act limits "Election Expenses" to $50,000.
