= Sarah Mae Flemming =

American activist

Sarah Mae Flemming Brown
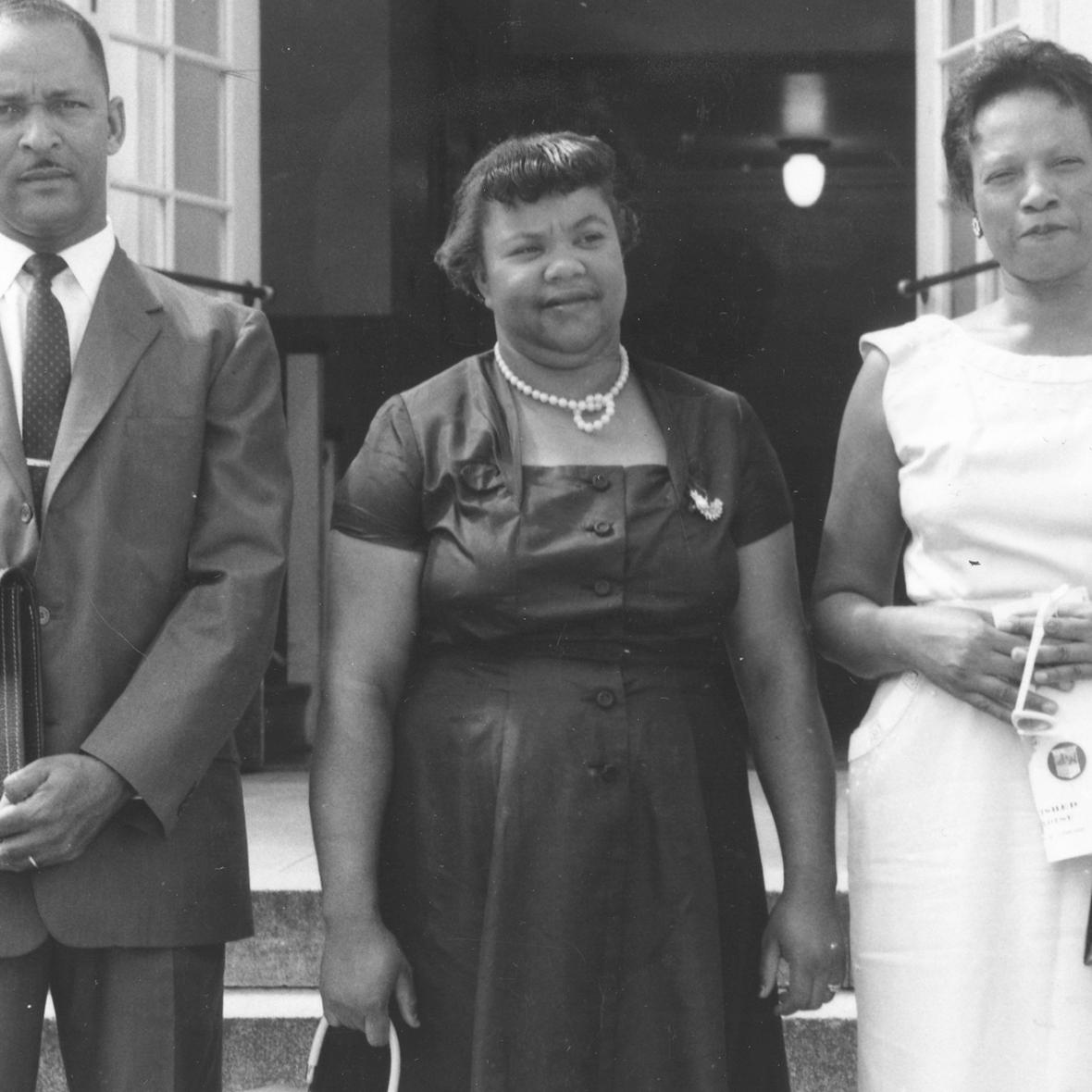
- Born: Sarah Mae Flemming; June 28, 1933; Eastover, South Carolina
- Died: Eastover, South Carolina
- Resting place: Eastover, South Carolina
- Occupation: Domestic worker
- Known for: Civil Rights Activism
- Spouse: John Brown
- Children: 3

Sarah Mae Flemming Brown (June 28, 1933 – June 16, 1993) was an African-American woman who was expelled from a bus in Columbia, South Carolina, seventeen months before Rosa Parks refused to surrender her seat on an Alabama bus in 1955. Flemming's lawsuit against the bus company played an important role later in the Parks case.

== Early life ==
Sarah Mae Flemming was born June 28, 1933, to Mack and Rosella Goodwin Flemming in Eastover, South Carolina. She grew up on the family's 188-acre (0.76 km^{2}) farm as one of seven siblings in the Jim Crow South, where racial segregation limited access to educational and economic opportunities. She did have the opportunity to complete the tenth or eleventh grade at Webber High School in Eastover before leaving school to work to support family responsibilities. She spent a year working for an uncle in Ohio before returning to South Carolina, where she moved in with a cousin and began working two jobs as a domestic worker, a field that often involved low wages and long hours for the workers, in Columbia, South Carolina. Through her early life experiences living and working under segregation would later shape her response to racial discrimination in public spaces.

== Civil rights activism ==
On June 22, 1954, A twenty-year old Flemming boarded a South Carolina Electric and Gas (SCE&G) bus to go to work. She took the only empty seat, which she believed began the rows in which black riders were allowed to sit. The driver challenged her for sitting in a "white-only" section and because she was so humiliated, she signaled to get off at the next stop. The bus driver blocked her attempt to exit through the front of the bus and punched her in the stomach as he ordered her out the rear door.

Local civil rights activists heard of ordeal and enlisted attorney Phillip Wittenberg, a white attorney in Columbia, to represent her. Flemming v. South Carolina Electric and Gas was filed on July 21, 1954, in U.S. District Court. The allegation was that Flemming's Fourteenth Amendment right to equal protection had been violated. On February 16, 1955, Federal District Judge George Bell Timmerman, Sr. dismissed the case. Ms. Flemming appealed to the Fourth Circuit Court of Appeals and her case was argued on June 21, 1955. In Richmond, Virginia, the Fourth Circuit reversed Judge Timmerman on July 14, 1955 by deeming the segregation unconstitutional, and remanded the case for further proceedings. This decision would later be cited in the case of Rosa Parks.

SCE&G appealed the decision of the Appeals Court. On April 23, 1956, the United States Supreme Court refused to review the 4th Circuit Court of Appeals decision and on June 13, 1956, Judge Timmerman dismissed the case once again. Mr. Wittenberg decided not to handle a second appeal, as a result of Ku Klux Klan (KKK) telephone threats and cross burnings, which Flemming also experienced, and turned the case over to Thurgood Marshall and Robert Carter of the NAACP. For the third trial, Lincoln Jenkins, Jr. and Matthew J. Perry represented Ms. Flemming and the jury quickly found in the bus company's favor, but by that time the Montgomery bus boycott and the decision in Browder v. Gayle had been rendered, so a third appeal was not filed.

== Later life ==
During her legal case, Sarah Mae Flemming married John Brown of Gaston County, North Carolina. The couple had three children.

Sarah Mae Flemming Brown died of a heart attack brought on by diabetes on June 16, 1993, just before her 60th birthday. She was buried in the Goodwill Baptist Church cemetery in Eastover, South Carolina.

In 2005, a documentary entitled Before Rosa: The Unsung Contribution Of Sarah Mae Flemming aired on PBS stations across the United States.

Columbia SC 63, a civil rights group, celebrated the life of Sarah Mae Flemming Brown by hosting history tours in Eastover, South Carolina, as of 2025.

In 2025, The Comet, South Carolina's modern transit company, reserves a seat on their busses in memoriam of Sarah Mae Flemming Brown. Eastover, South Carolina, Sarah Mae Flemming Brown's home, also hosts a "Sarah Mae Flemming Day" on June 22 in remembrance.
