= Calgary-Bow =

Provincial electoral district in Alberta, Canada

Coordinates: 51.100°N 114.205°W

Alberta electoral district
- Calgary-Bow within the City of Calgary, 2017 boundaries

Provincial electoral district
- Legislature: Legislative Assembly of Alberta
MLA
Demetrios Nicolaides
United Conservative
- District created: 1971
- First contested: 1971
- Last contested: 2023

Calgary-Bow is a provincial electoral district in the city of Calgary, Alberta, Canada. The district is one of 87 districts mandated to return a single member (MLA) to the Legislative Assembly of Alberta using the first past the post method of voting.

The electoral district has been a stronghold for right leaning parties. Social Credit briefly held the district from 1971 to 1975 and the Progressive Conservatives have held the district uninterrupted until the 2015 provincial election, when the seat was won by NDP candidate Deborah Drever. The electoral district returned to electing conservative candidate in 2019 with United Conservative Party MLA Demetrios Nicolaides, who won re-election in 2023.

== History ==
The electoral district was created in the 1971 boundary re-distribution from Calgary West and Calgary Bowness.

The 2010 Alberta electoral district boundary re-distribution significantly changed the riding. The western boundaries were altered to conform to the new Calgary city limits which had been expanded since 2003. The riding lost all land that was east of Sarcee Trail and North of the Bow River to the electoral districts of Calgary-Currie and Calgary-Varsity. The district was also expanded south into land that used to be in Calgary-West up to the new south boundary of Bow Trail / 12 Street SW. The Calgary-Bow electoral district would have a population of 37,806, which was 7.5% below the provincial average of 40,880.

The 2017 Alberta electoral district boundary re-distribution saw the communities of Montgomery and Spruce Cliff added to the constituency. The boundaries as adjusted would give the electoral district a population of 51,358 in 2017, 10% above the provincial average of 46,803.

=== Boundary history ===
2 Calgary-Bow 2003 boundaries
Bordering districts
North	East	West	South
Calgary-North West	Calgary-Buffalo, Calgary-Mountain View and Calgary-Varsity	Foothills-Rocky View	Calgary-Currie, Calgary-West
riding map goes here			
Legal description from the Statutes of Alberta 2003, Electoral Divisions Act
Starting at the intersection of Stoney Trail NW with Scenic Acres Link NW; then 1. northeast along Scenic Acres Link NW to the intersection with Scurfield Drive NW; 2. north and east along Scurfield Drive NW to the intersection with Scenic Acres Boulevard NW; 3. southeast along Scenic Acres Boulevard NW to the intersection with Nose Hill Drive NW; 4. north along Nose Hill Drive NW to the intersection with Crowchild Trail NW; 5. southeast along Crowchild Trail NW to the intersection with Silver Springs Gate NW; 6. south and west along Silver Springs Gate NW to the intersection with Silver Springs Boulevard NW; 7. south along Silver Springs Boulevard NW and its extension to the right bank of the Bow River; 8. south and east along the right bank of the Bow River to the westerly extension of 32 Avenue NW; 9. east along the extension and 32 Avenue NW to Shaganappi Trail NW; 10. south along Shaganappi Trail NW to the southeasterly extension of 23 Avenue NW; 11. northwest along the extension and 23 Avenue NW to the intersection with 48 Street NW; 12. southwest along 48 Street NW to its intersection with Bowness Road NW; 13. west along Bowness Road NW to its intersection with Home Road NW; 14. south along Home Road NW and its extension to the right bank of the Bow River; 15. southeast along the right bank of the Bow River to the northerly extension of 37 Street SW; 16. south along the extension and 37 Street SW to 8 Avenue SW; 17. west along 8 Avenue SW to 45 Street SW; 18. south along 45 Street SW to 17 Avenue SW; 19. west along 17 Avenue SW and its westerly extension to Sarcee Trail SW; 20. north and northwest along Sarcee Trail to the intersection with the north boundary of the south half of Sec. 26, Twp. 24, Rge. 2 W5; 21. west along the north boundary of the south half of Secs. 26, 27 and 28 to the west Calgary city boundary; 22. north, west, north and east along the west city boundary to the left bank of the Bow River; 23. east along the left bank of the Bow River to its intersection with Stoney Trail NW; 24. north along Stoney Trail NW to the starting point.
Note:

4 Calgary-Bow 2010 boundaries
Bordering districts
North	East	West	South
Calgary-Hawkwood and Calgary-North West	Calgary-Currie and Calgary-Varsity	Chestermere-Rocky View	Calgary-West
Note: Boundary descriptions were not used in the 2010 redistribution.

=== Representation history ===
Calgary-Bow
Assembly	Years	Member	Party
Riding created from Calgary Bowness and Calgary Queens Park
17th	1971–1975	Roy Wilson	Social Credit
18th	1975–1979	Neil Webber	Progressive Conservative
19th	1979–1982	Neil Webber	Progressive Conservative
20th	1982–1986	Neil Webber	Progressive Conservative
21st	1986–1989	Neil Webber	Progressive Conservative
22nd	1989–1993	Bonnie Laing	Progressive Conservative
23rd	1993–1997	Bonnie Laing	Progressive Conservative
24th	1997–2001	Bonnie Laing	Progressive Conservative
25th	2001–2004	Alana DeLong	Progressive Conservative
26th	2004–2008	Alana DeLong	Progressive Conservative
27th	2008–2012	Alana DeLong	Progressive Conservative
28th	2012–2015	Alana DeLong	Progressive Conservative
29th	2015–2019	Deborah Drever	New Democratic
29th	2015–2016	Deborah Drever	Independent New Democrat
29th	2016–2019	Deborah Drever	New Democratic
30th	2019–2023	Demetrios Nicolaides	United Conservative
31st	2023–Present	Demetrios Nicolaides	United Conservative

The electoral district of Calgary-Bow was created in the 1971 boundary redistribution from the electoral districts of Calgary West and Calgary Bowness.

The election held that year was won by Social Credit candidate Roy Wilson. He won the district in a closely contested election over Progressive Conservative Bill Wearmouth taking just under half the popular vote. The win came despite the Social Credit party losing government that year. The race was reached a record for turnout in the district that hasn't been matched since.

Wilson ran for his second term in 1975 but was defeated by Progressive Conservative candidate Neil Webber. He would be re-elected with a landslide majority in 1979 and be appointed to the provincial cabinet under Peter Lougheed after the election.

Webber would be re-elected two more times in 1982 and 1986. He won the highest popular vote of his career and in the districts history in the 1982 election. Weber would keep his cabinet post after Don Getty became Premier in 1985 but he decided not to run for re-election and retired at dissolution.

After Wilson retired and the electoral district returned Progressive Conservative candidate Bonnie Laing who won a very close race over former Calgary Alderman Tim Bardsley in the 1986 election. She would hold the district for two more terms before retiring.

Alana DeLong was first elected to her first term in 2001 and has been returned twice more in the 2004 and 2008 elections.

Deborah Drever of the New Democratic Party of Alberta was the representative following the 2015 general election, which saw the provincial NDP under Rachel Notley defeat the Progressive Conservatives led by Premier Jim Prentice. Ms. Drever sat as an independent for 232 days during her term, arising from controversial social media posts. The current representative is Demetrios Niklaides of the United Conservative Party of Alberta, who defeated Ms. Drever in the 2019 general election. Mr. Nikolaides was named the Minister of Advanced Education following the election and remains in that position. Former Calgary City Councillor Druh Farrell has indicated interest in running for the NDP in the 2023 general provincial election.

== Legislative election results ==
=== 2023 ===
2023 Alberta general election
Party	Candidate	Votes	%	±%
United Conservative	Demetrios Nicolaides	13,175	49.74	-6.15
New Democratic	Druh Farrell	12,552	47.39	+13.23
Alberta Party	Paul Godard	670	2.53	-4.56
Solidarity Movement	Manuel Santos	89	0.34	–
Total		26,486	99.29	–
Rejected and declined		190	0.71	
Turnout		26,676	66.43	
Eligible voters		40,159		
United Conservative hold		Swing		-9.69
Source(s) Source: Elections Alberta

=== 2019 ===
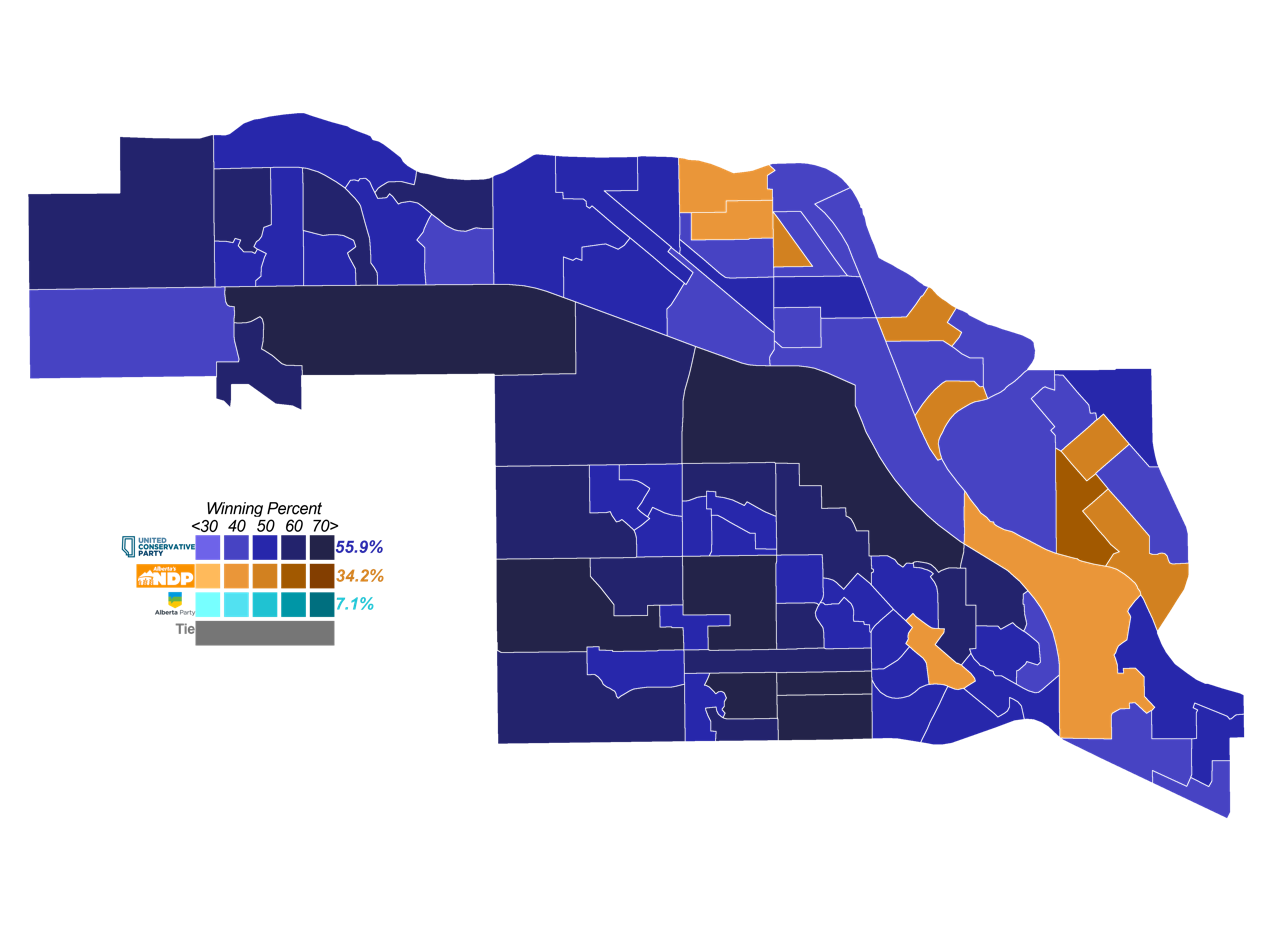
Results by polling division

2019 Alberta general election
Party	Candidate	Votes	%	±%	Expenditures
United Conservative	Demetrios Nicolaides	13,987	55.90	+1.89	$75,865
New Democratic	Deborah Drever	8,548	34.16	-1.94	$48,057
Alberta Party	Paul Godard	1,774	7.09	+4.52	$6,206
Liberal	Daniel Ejumabone	320	1.28	-3.45	$500
Green	Marion Westoll	233	0.93	-1.66	$950
Freedom Conservative	Regina Shakirova	161	0.64	–	$500
Total		25,023	99.41	–	
Rejected, spoiled and declined		149	0.59	–	
Turnout		25,172	68.05		
Eligible voters		36,993			
United Conservative notional hold		Swing		+1.92	
Source(s) Source: Elections Alberta Note: Expenses is the sum of "Election Expenses", "Other Expenses" and "Transfers Issued". The Elections Act limits "Election Expenses" to $50,000.

=== 2015 ===
2015 Alberta general election
Party	Candidate	Votes	%	±%
New Democratic	Deborah Drever	5,669	34.51%	30.47%
Progressive Conservative	Byron Nelson	5,419	32.98%	-14.22%
Wildrose	Trevor Grover	3,752	22.84%	-15.08%
Liberal	Matt Gaiser	682	4.15%	-5.09%
Alberta Party	Jonathon Himann	459	2.79%	1.19%
Green	David Reid	448	2.73%	–
Total		16,429	–	–
Rejected, spoiled and declined		122	–	–
Eligible electors / turnout		31,990	51.74%	-4.65%
New Democratic gain from Progressive Conservative		Swing		-3.89%
Source(s) Source: "04 - Calgary-Bow, 2015 Alberta general election". officialresults.elections.ab.ca. Elections Alberta.

2015 Alberta general election redistributed results
Party	Votes	%
New Democratic	7,080	36.10
Progressive Conservative	6,212	31.67
Wildrose	4,379	22.33
Liberal	928	4.73
Green	509	2.60
Alberta Party	504	2.57
Source(s) Source: Ridingbuilder

=== 2012 ===
2012 Alberta general election
Party	Candidate	Votes	%	±%
Progressive Conservative	Alana S. DeLong	6,994	47.21%	2.05%
Wildrose	Tim Dyck	5,617	37.91%	28.29%
Liberal	Stephanie Shewchuk	1,369	9.24%	-25.69%
New Democratic	Jason Nishiyama	598	4.04%	0.61%
Alberta Party	Ellen Phillips	237	1.60%	–
Total		14,815	–	–
Rejected, spoiled and declined		72	–	–
Eligible electors / turnout		26,401	56.39%	8.31%
Progressive Conservative hold		Swing		-0.46%
Source(s) Source: "04 - Calgary-Bow, 2012 Alberta general election". officialresults.elections.ab.ca. Elections Alberta.

=== 2008 ===
2008 Alberta general election
Party	Candidate	Votes	%	±%
Progressive Conservative	Alana S. DeLong	6,687	45.16%	-3.04%
Liberal	Greg Flanagan	5,173	34.93%	7.17%
Wildrose Alliance	Barry J. Holizki	1,425	9.62%	1.58%
Green	Randy Weeks	845	5.71%	0.06%
New Democratic	Teale Phelps Bondaroff	507	3.42%	-5.55%
Social Credit	Leonard Skowronski	171	1.15%	0.39%
Total		14,808	–	–
Rejected, spoiled and declined		64	–	–
Eligible electors / turnout		30,930	48.08%	0.94%
Progressive Conservative hold		Swing		-5.11%
Source(s) Source: "02 - Calgary-Bow, 2008 Alberta general election". officialresults.elections.ab.ca. Elections Alberta. The Report on the March 3, 2008 Provincial General Election of the Twenty-seventh Legislative Assembly. Elections Alberta. July 28, 2008. pp. 174–177.

=== 2004 ===
2004 Alberta general election
Party	Candidate	Votes	%	±%
Progressive Conservative	Alana S. DeLong	6,097	48.20%	-15.74%
Liberal	Kelly McDonnell	3,512	27.76%	2.80%
New Democratic	Jennifer Banks	1,135	8.97%	2.34%
Alberta Alliance	James D. Istvanffy	1,017	8.04%	–
Green	Marie Picken	714	5.64%	4.12%
Social Credit	Douglas A. Picken	97	0.77%	–
Independent	Margaret (Peggy) Askin	78	0.62%	-0.81%
Total		12,650	–	–
Rejected, spoiled and declined		90	–	–
Eligible electors / turnout		27,026	47.14%	-8.12%
Progressive Conservative hold		Swing		-9.27%
Source(s) Source: "Calgary-Bow, 2004 Alberta general election" (PDF). Elections Alberta.

=== 2001 ===
2001 Alberta general election
Party	Candidate	Votes	%	±%
Progressive Conservative	Alana S. DeLong	8,274	63.94%	9.51%
Liberal	Kelly McDonnell	3,230	24.96%	-8.45%
New Democratic	Jeff Bayliss	858	6.63%	-2.71%
Greens	Jan Triska	394	3.04%	1.52%
Independent	Margaret (Peggy) Askin	184	1.42%	–
Total		12,940	–	–
Rejected, spoiled and declined		51	–	–
Eligible electors / turnout		23,510	55.26%	-0.70%
Progressive Conservative hold		Swing		8.98%
Source(s) Source: "Calgary-Bow Official Results 2001 Alberta general election" (PDF). Elections Alberta.

=== 1997 ===
1997 Alberta general election
Party	Candidate	Votes	%	±%
Progressive Conservative	Bonnie Laing	6,664	54.43%	8.15%
Liberal	Mark Dickerson	4,091	33.41%	-2.03%
New Democratic	Brent Johner	1,144	9.34%	-3.25%
Greens	David Crowe	187	1.53%	-0.37%
Natural Law	Ronnie Shapka	158	1.29%	0.78%
Total		12,244	–	–
Rejected, spoiled and declined		81	–	–
Eligible electors / turnout		22,025	55.96%	-8.63%
Progressive Conservative hold		Swing		5.09%
Source(s) Source: "Calgary-Bow Official Results 1997 Alberta general election". Alberta Heritage Community Foundation.

=== 1993 ===
1993 Alberta general election
Party	Candidate	Votes	%	±%
Progressive Conservative	Bonnie Laing	7,011	46.28%	11.39%
Liberal	Rob Van Walleghem	5,369	35.44%	1.22%
New Democratic	Anne McGrath	1,908	12.59%	-18.29%
Social Credit	Patrick John Hudson	376	2.48%	–
Greens	David Crowe	287	1.89%	–
Confederation of Regions	Roberta McDonald	120	0.79%	–
Natural Law	Alan Livingston	78	0.51%	–
Total		15,149	–	–
Rejected, spoiled and declined		60	–	–
Eligible electors / turnout		23,546	64.59%	12.48%
Progressive Conservative hold		Swing		5.09%
Source(s) Source: "Calgary-Bow Official Results 1993 Alberta general election". Alberta Heritage Community Foundation.

=== 1989 ===
1989 Alberta general election
Party	Candidate	Votes	%	±%
Progressive Conservative	Bonnie Laing	3,968	34.89%	-21.23%
Liberal	Timothy Walter Bardsley	3,892	34.22%	27.86%
New Democratic	Scott Jeffrey	3,513	30.89%	-3.83%
Total		11,373	–	–
Rejected, spoiled and declined		44	–	–
Eligible electors / turnout		21,907	52.12%	8.79%
Progressive Conservative hold		Swing		-10.37%
Source(s) Source: "Calgary-Bow Official Results 1989 Alberta general election". Alberta Heritage Community Foundation.

=== 1986 ===
1986 Alberta general election
Party	Candidate	Votes	%	±%
Progressive Conservative	Neil Webber	5,392	56.12%	-14.13%
New Democratic	Scott Jeffrey	3,336	34.72%	17.61%
Liberal	Annyteh K. Pezuolla	611	6.36%	3.52%
Heritage Party	Douglas Attfield	269	2.80%	–
Total		9,608	–	–
Rejected, spoiled and declined		49	–	–
Eligible electors / turnout		22,287	43.33%	-19.03%
Progressive Conservative hold		Swing		-15.87%
Source(s) Source: "Calgary-Bow Official Results 1986 Alberta general election". Alberta Heritage Community Foundation.

=== 1982 ===
1982 Alberta general election
Party	Candidate	Votes	%	±%
Progressive Conservative	Neil Webber	9,412	70.25%	5.64%
New Democratic	Catherine Martini	2,293	17.12%	4.63%
Western Canada Concept	Roy P. Rasmusen	1,059	7.90%	–
Liberal	Floyd Allen	380	2.84%	-2.97%
Social Credit	Douglas Stewart Williams	253	1.89%	-14.77%
Total		13,397	–	–
Rejected, spoiled and declined		44	–	–
Eligible electors / turnout		21,555	62.36%	9.29%
Progressive Conservative hold		Swing		2.59%
Source(s) Source: "Calgary-Bow Official Results 1982 Alberta general election". Alberta Heritage Community Foundation.

=== 1979 ===
1979 Alberta general election
Party	Candidate	Votes	%	±%
Progressive Conservative	Neil Webber	7,042	64.61%	12.34%
Social Credit	Jim Beale	1,816	16.66%	-18.55%
New Democratic	Floyd A. Johnson	1,361	12.49%	3.74%
Liberal	Clive Scott	633	5.81%	2.68%
Communist	Adela Polancec	47	0.43%	-0.21%
Total		10,899	–	–
Rejected, spoiled and declined		37	–	–
Eligible electors / turnout		20,608	53.07%	-5.48%
Progressive Conservative hold		Swing		15.44%
Source(s) Source: "Calgary-Bow Official Results 1979 Alberta general election". Alberta Heritage Community Foundation.

=== 1975 ===
1975 Alberta general election
Party	Candidate	Votes	%	±%
Progressive Conservative	Neil Webber	5,251	52.27%	12.63%
Social Credit	Roy Wilson	3,537	35.21%	-12.92%
New Democratic	Jack Dunbar	879	8.75%	-3.47%
Liberal	Mike Prohaszka	314	3.13%	–
Communist	David Whitefield	64	0.64%	–
Total		10,045	–	–
Rejected, spoiled and declined		30	–	–
Eligible electors / turnout		17,209	58.54%	-9.45%
Progressive Conservative gain from Social Credit		Swing		4.29%
Source(s) Source: "Calgary-Bow Official Results 1975 Alberta general election". Alberta Heritage Community Foundation.

=== 1971 ===
1971 Alberta general election
Party	Candidate	Votes	%	±%
Social Credit	Roy Wilson	5,539	48.13%	–
Progressive Conservative	Bill Wearmouth	4,563	39.65%	–
New Democratic	Fred Spooner	1,407	12.23%	–
Total		11,509	–	–
Rejected, spoiled and declined		68	–	–
Eligible electors / turnout		17,026	68.00%	–
Social Credit pickup new district.				
Source(s) Source: "Calgary-Bow Official Results 1971 Alberta general election". Alberta Heritage Community Foundation.

== Senate nominee election results ==
=== 2004 ===
2004 Senate nominee election results: Calgary-Bow				Turnout 47.11%	
Affiliation	Candidate	Votes	% votes	% ballots	Rank
Progressive Conservative	Bert Brown	5,236	16.72%	50.55%	1
Progressive Conservative	Jim Silye	4,865	15.54%	46.96%	5
Progressive Conservative	Betty Unger	4,087	13.05%	39.45%	2
Independent	Link Byfield	3,227	10.30%	31.15%	4
Progressive Conservative	David Usherwood	2,863	9.14%	27.64%	6
Progressive Conservative	Cliff Breitkreuz	2,709	8.65%	26.15%	3
Independent	Tom Sindlinger	2,459	7.85%	23.74%	9
Alberta Alliance	Vance Gough	2,134	6.81%	20.60%	8
Alberta Alliance	Michael Roth	1,955	6.24%	18.87%	7
Alberta Alliance	Gary Horan	1,782	5.70%	17.20%	10
Total votes		31,317	100%		
Total ballots		10,359	3.02 votes per ballot		
Rejected, spoiled and declined		2,373			
27,026 eligible electors

Voters had the option of selecting four candidates on the ballot.

== Student vote results ==
=== 2004 ===
Participating schools
Bowcroft Elementary School
Thomas B. Riley School

On November 19, 2004, a student vote was conducted at participating Alberta schools to parallel the 2004 Alberta general election results. The vote was designed to educate students and simulate the electoral process for persons who had not yet reached the legal majority. The vote was conducted in 80 of the 83 provincial electoral districts, with students voting for actual election candidates. Schools with a large student body that resided in another electoral district had the option to vote for candidates outside of the electoral district than where they were physically located.

2004 Alberta student vote results
Affiliation	Candidate	Votes	%
Progressive Conservative	Alana DeLong	99	31.03%
Green	Marie Picken	75	23.51%
Liberal	Kelly McDonnell	51	15.99%
New Democratic	Jennifer Banks	48	15.05%
Alberta Alliance	James Istvanffy	17	5.33%
Social Credit	Douglas Picken	16	5.02%
Independent	Margaret Askin	13	4.07%
Total		319	100%
Rejected, spoiled and declined		9	

=== 2012 ===
2012 Alberta student vote results
Affiliation	Candidate	Votes	%
Progressive Conservative	Alana DeLong		%
Wildrose	Tim Dyck		
Liberal	Stephanie Shewchuk		%
Alberta Party	Ellen Phillips		
NDP	Jason Nishiyama		%
Total			100%

== See also ==
- List of Alberta provincial electoral districts
- Canadian provincial electoral districts
