= Alistair MacGregor =

Canadian politician (born 1979)

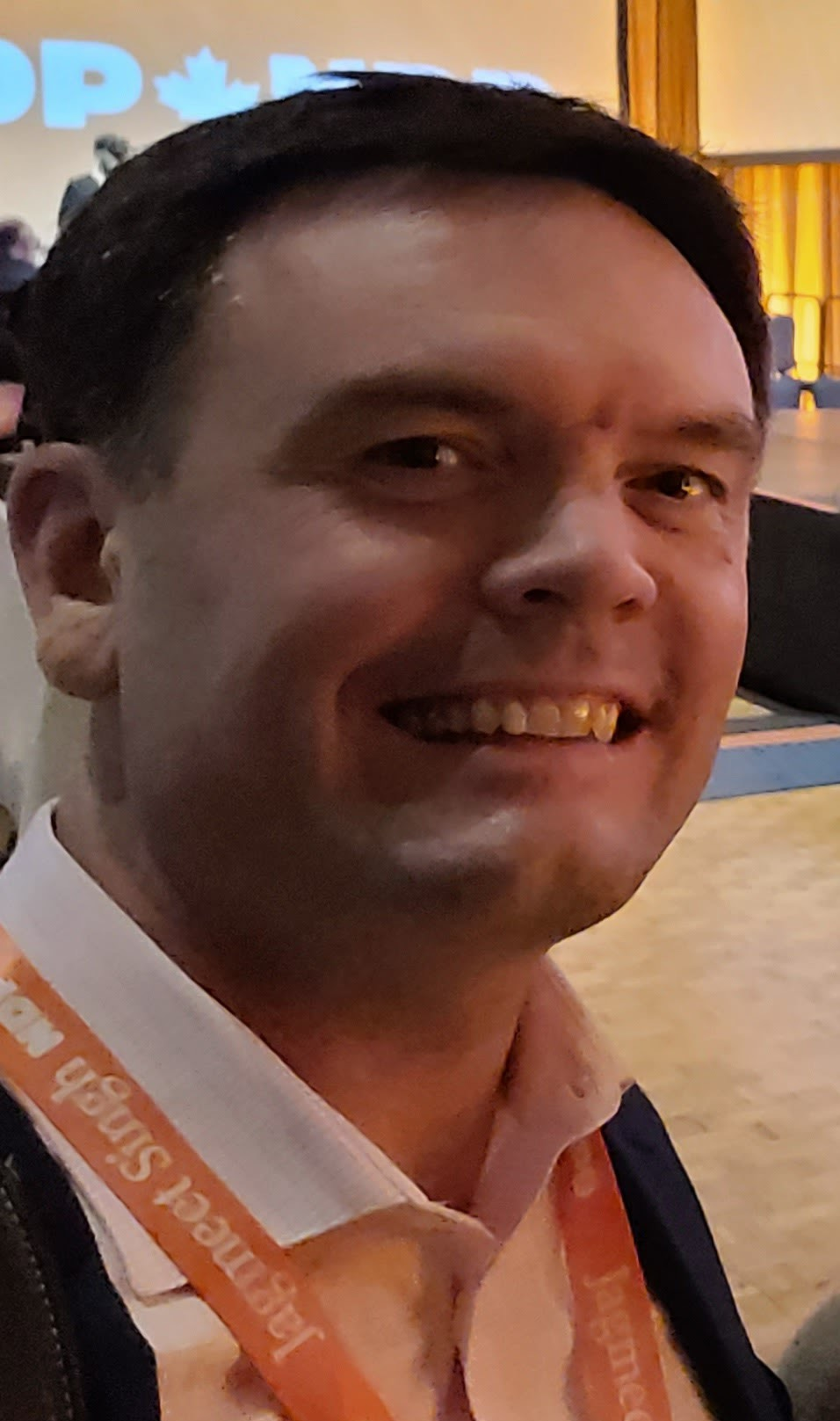

Member of Parliament for Cowichan—Malahat—Langford
- In office October 19, 2015 – March 23, 2025
- Preceded by: Jean Crowder
- Succeeded by: Jeff Kibble

Personal details
- Born: May 4, 1979 (age 47) Victoria, British Columbia, Canada
- Party: New Democratic Party
- Education: University of Victoria; Royal Roads University
- Profession: Executive Assistant

Alistair Bruce MacGregor (born May 4, 1979) is a Canadian politician, who was elected to the House of Commons of Canada in the 2015 Canadian federal election to represent the electoral district of Cowichan—Malahat—Langford. He is a member of the New Democratic Party. During the 42nd Canadian Parliament, MacGregor sponsored three private member bills, though none reached second reading stage: Bill 252 to add Shawnigan Lake to the list of navigable waters regulated under the Navigation Protection Act, Bill C-279 to limit federal election campaigns to a maximum of 46 days, Bill C-430 to create an organic farming tax credit.

Prior to his election to the House of Commons, MacGregor worked as a constituency assistant to Member of Parliament Jean Crowder. He also previously worked as a tree-planting supervisor and a millworker.

He was unseated in the 2025 Canadian federal election.

== Background ==
Alistair MacGregor was born in Victoria, British Columbia and raised in Duncan where he attended Cowichan Secondary School. While working summers as a tree planter, he graduated from University of Victoria in 2003 with Bachelor of Arts, and subsequently from Royal Roads University in 2008 with a Masters of Arts with a focus in professional communication. In 2007 he had moved to Duncan where he began working as the constituency assistant to Member of Parliament Jean Crowder, who had offices in both Duncan and Nanaimo. There he married, and fathered twin girls. Upon Crowder's retirement, MacGregor entered the NDP nomination race to select a candidate for the upcoming 2015 federal election in the new Cowichan—Malahat—Langford riding. In the January 2015 nomination election, he was selected over five other candidates.

With the 2015 federal election approaching, the other parties also nominated candidates and the NDP leader Tom Mulcair visited the riding during his tour of Vancouver Island. The Conservative Party nominated North Cowichan councillor John Koury but he withdrew from the race less than two months before the election citing family issues and he was replaced by chiropractor Martin Barker from Duncan. Likewise the Liberal Party originally nominated Langford small business owner Maria Manna but she was replaced by former RCMP officer Luke Krayenhoff of Saanich after Manna withdrew due to a controversy regarding previous comments posted on Facebook. Despite an unexpected surge for the Liberal Party, MacGregor won the riding in line with pre-election polls that projected a NDP victory. While he won his riding, MacGregor's NDP lost seats nationally and fell to third party status, with the Liberal Party forming a majority government.

On January 31, 2018, MacGregor was named the NDP's critic for Agriculture and Agri-food, and serves as the vice-chair of the parliamentary standing committee on Agriculture and Agri-food.

== 42nd Parliament ==
As the 42nd Canadian Parliament began, NDP leader Mulcair appointed MacGregor to be the party's critic for seniors and its deputy critic for heritage. He was also appointed to sit on the Committee on Justice and Human Rights. MacGregor opened a constituency office in Langford and later one in Duncan. On March 10, 2016, he introduced his first private member bill, Bill C-252, which would have added Shawnigan Lake to the list of navigable waters regulated under the Navigation Protection Act, in response to the previous parliament's Jobs and Growth Act which had removed it. On May 31, 2016, he introduced his another private member bill, Bill C-279, which would amend to the Canada Elections Act to insert a maximum duration of 46 days for an election period. This bill was in response to the 2015 election campaign which lasted 78 days, the longest in Canadian history, and which MaGregor viewed as unfairly favouring the most well-funded political parties. MacGregor held a series of town hall meetings in his riding to hear views on electoral reform and to promote the private member bill. In February 2017 Mulcair reassigned MacGregor to be the party's critic for Justice and in this role he held the party's stance that marijuana possession should be decriminalized during the process of its legalization. After Mulcair's resignation, MacGregor endorsed Jagmeet Singh in the 2017 leadership election. Following Singh's victory, he reassigned MacGregor to be the party's deputy critic for Justice and Heritage.

MacGregor went on to introduce two more private member bills. On February 21, 2019, MacGregor introduced Bill C-430 that would have amended the Income Tax Act to create an organic farming tax credit. MacGregor then introduced Bill C-431 that would have required the Canada Pension Plan Investment Board integrate environmental, social and corporate governance objectives into its investment decisions.

== 43rd Parliament ==
MacGregor sought re-election in the 2019 general election and was challenged by Alana DeLong of the Conservative Party, former chief of the Cowichan Tribes Lydia Hwitsum of the Green Party, and realtor Blair Herbert for the Liberal Party. While MacGregor won the riding, his NDP lost seats overall becoming the fourth largest party. As the 43rd Canadian Parliament commenced, he was appointed to be the NDP critic on agriculture and rural economic development issues, as well as the deputy critic for justice and human rights. He re-introduced his private member bill seeking to prohibit investments of the Canada Pension Plan in entities that produce weapons or commissioned of human, labour or environmental rights violations but it was defeated with both Liberals and Conservatives voting against it. His next private member bill, Bill C-250, sought to amend the Canada Shipping Act to prohibit the anchoring of freighter vessels using coastal waters along the Salish Sea in response to low voluntary compliance rates with Transport Canada protocols.

On April 26, 2021, in the 2nd Session, of the 43rd Parliament he introduced and gave the first reading of in the House of Commons of Bill C-290 a Soil Conservation Act, a private members bill "respecting soil conservation and soil health".

== Electoral record ==
2025 Canadian federal election: Cowichan—Malahat—Langford
Party	Candidate	Votes	%	±%	Expenditures
Conservative	Jeff Kibble	28,370	37.24	+8.88	$90,618.71
New Democratic	Alistair MacGregor	24,826	32.59	–10.19	$88,603.95
Liberal	Blair Herbert	21,478	28.20	+11.82	$43,476.51
Green	Kathleen Code	1,500	1.97	–4.25	$4,702.67
Total valid votes/expense limit		76,174	99.53	–	$149,526.18
Total rejected ballots		361	0.47	–0.01	
Turnout		76,535	72.41	+8.45	
Eligible voters		105,698			
Conservative notional gain		Swing			
Source: Elections Canada

2021 Canadian federal election: Cowichan—Malahat—Langford
Party	Candidate	Votes	%	±%	Expenditures
New Democratic	Alistair MacGregor	26,968	42.78	+6.73	$49,798.01
Conservative	Alana DeLong	17,870	28.35	+2.35	$51,680.34
Liberal	Blair Herbert	10,320	16.37	+0.58	$28,769.73
People's	Mark Hecht	3,952	6.27	+4.64	$13,032.24
Green	Lia Versaevel	3,922	6.22	–13.99	$6,881.80
Total valid votes/expense limit		63,032	99.52	–	$125,299.84
Total rejected ballots		306	0.48	+0.05	
Turnout		63,338	63.96	–5.92	
Eligible voters		99,024			
New Democratic hold		Swing			
Source: Elections Canada

2019 Canadian federal election: Cowichan—Malahat—Langford
Party	Candidate	Votes	%	±%	Expenditures
New Democratic	Alistair MacGregor	23,519	36.06	+0.12	$85,558.94
Conservative	Alana DeLong	16,959	26.00	+3.19	$45,957.36
Green	Lydia Hwitsum	13,181	20.21	+3.27	$58,460.55
Liberal	Blair Herbert	10,301	15.79	–7.98	$25,800.21
People's	Rhonda Chen	1,066	1.63	–	$8,389.99
Christian Heritage	Robin Morton Stanbridge	202	0.31	–	$1,993.05
Total valid votes/expense limit		65,228	99.57	–	$117,241.30
Total rejected ballots		282	0.43	+0.06	
Turnout		65,510	69.88	–5.84	
Eligible voters		93,745			
New Democratic hold		Swing		–1.53	
Source: Elections Canada

2015 Canadian federal election: Cowichan—Malahat—Langford
Party	Candidate	Votes	%	±%	Expenditures
New Democratic	Alistair MacGregor	22,200	35.94	–7.65	$104,734.63
Liberal	Luke Krayenhoff	14,685	23.77	+17.97	$21,780.35
Conservative	Martin Barker	14,091	22.81	–20.25	$77,247.07
Green	Fran Hunt-Jinnouchi	10,462	16.93	+9.71	$99,481.30
Marxist–Leninist	Alastair Haythornthwaite	340	0.55	–	none listed
Total valid votes/expense limit		61,778	99.63		$214,942.07
Total rejected ballots		230	0.37	–	
Turnout		62,008	75.72	–	
Eligible voters		81,888			
New Democratic hold		Swing		–12.81	
Source: Elections Canada
