= Cowichan—Malahat—Langford =

Federal electoral district in British Columbia, Canada

British Columbia electoral district
- Interactive map of riding boundaries from the 2025 federal election. Point indicates the city of Langford.

Federal electoral district
- Legislature: House of Commons
MP
Jeff Kibble
Conservative
- District created: 2013
- First contested: 2015
- Last contested: 2025
- District webpage: profile, map

Demographics
- Population (2011): 99,160
- Electors (2019): 92,637
- Area (km²): 4,749
- Pop. density (per km²): 20.9
- Census division(s): Capital, Cowichan Valley
- Census subdivision(s): Langford, North Cowichan, Duncan, Lake Cowichan, Highlands, Cowichan, Penelakut Island, Malachan, Malahat, Halalt

Cowichan—Malahat—Langford is a federal electoral district in British Columbia, Canada. It is on south-central Vancouver Island. It encompasses a portion of British Columbia previously included in the electoral districts of Nanaimo—Cowichan and Esquimalt—Juan de Fuca.

Cowichan—Malahat—Langford was created by the 2012 federal electoral boundaries redistribution and was legally defined in the 2013 representation order. It came into effect upon the call of the 42nd Canadian federal election, polling for which took place on 19 October 2015.

== Demographics ==
Panethnic groups in Cowichan—Malahat—Langford (2011−2021)
| Panethnic group | 2021 | | 2016 | | 2011 | |
| Panethnic group | Pop. | % | Pop. | % | Pop. | % |
|---|---|---|---|---|---|---|
| European (Note: Statistic includes all persons that did not make up part of a visible minority or an indigenous identity.) | 98,015 | 80.15% | 88,650 | 83.7% | 83,625 | 85.91% |
| Indigenous | 12,120 | 9.91% | 10,160 | 9.59% | 8,700 | 8.94% |
| South Asian | 3,135 | 2.56% | 2,160 | 2.04% | 1,725 | 1.77% |
| East Asian (Note: Statistic includes total responses of "Chinese", "Korean", and "Japanese" under visible minority section on census.) | 2,845 | 2.33% | 1,920 | 1.81% | 1,360 | 1.4% |
| Southeast Asian (Note: Statistic includes total responses of "Filipino" and "Southeast Asian" under visible minority section on census.) | 2,765 | 2.26% | 1,440 | 1.36% | 935 | 0.96% |
| African | 1,310 | 1.07% | 510 | 0.48% | 395 | 0.41% |
| Latin American | 895 | 0.73% | 520 | 0.49% | 245 | 0.25% |
| Middle Eastern (Note: Statistic includes total responses of "West Asian" and "Arab" under visible minority section on census.) | 535 | 0.44% | 250 | 0.24% | 90 | 0.09% |
| Other (Note: Statistic includes total responses of "Visible minority, n.i.e." and "Multiple visible minorities" under visible minority section on census.) | 685 | 0.56% | 310 | 0.29% | 255 | 0.26% |
| Total responses | 122,295 | 98.43% | 105,915 | 98.02% | 97,345 | 98.13% |
| Total population | 124,247 | 100% | 108,052 | 100% | 99,195 | 100% |
Notes: Totals greater than 100% due to multiple origin responses. Demographics based on 2012 Canadian federal electoral redistribution riding boundaries.

== Members of Parliament ==
This riding has elected the following members of the House of Commons of Canada:

| Parliament | Years | Member | Party |
|---|---|---|---|
Cowichan—Malahat—Langford; Riding created from Esquimalt—Juan de Fuca and Nanaimo—Cowichan
| 42nd | 2015–2019 | Alistair MacGregor | New Democratic |
| 43rd | 2019–2021 | Alistair MacGregor | New Democratic |
| 44th | 2021–2025 | Alistair MacGregor | New Democratic |
| 45th | 2025–present | Jeff Kibble | Conservative |

== Election results ==
View source data.
Graph of election results in Cowichan—Malahat—Langford (minor parties that never got 2% of the vote or didn't run consistently are omitted)

=== 2023 representation order ===
2025 Canadian federal election
| Party | Candidate | Votes | % | ±% | Expenditures |
|---|---|---|---|---|---|
| Conservative | Jeff Kibble | 28,370 | 37.24 | +8.88 | $90,618.71 |
| New Democratic | Alistair MacGregor | 24,826 | 32.59 | –10.19 | $88,603.95 |
| Liberal | Blair Herbert | 21,478 | 28.20 | +11.82 | $43,476.51 |
| Green | Kathleen Code | 1,500 | 1.97 | –4.25 | $4,702.67 |
| Total valid votes/expense limit | | 76,174 | 99.53 | – | $149,526.18 |
| Total rejected ballots | | 361 | 0.47 | –0.01 | |
| Turnout | | 76,535 | 72.41 | +8.45 | |
| Eligible voters | | 105,698 | | | |
| Conservative notional gain | | Swing | | | |
Source: Elections Canada

2021 federal election redistributed results
| Party | Vote | % |
|---|---|---|
| New Democratic | 26,939 | 42.78 |
| Conservative | 17,855 | 28.36 |
| Liberal | 10,312 | 16.38 |
| People's | 3,947 | 6.27 |
| Green | 3,915 | 6.22 |

=== 2013 representation order ===
2021 Canadian federal election
| Party | Candidate | Votes | % | ±% | Expenditures |
|---|---|---|---|---|---|
| New Democratic | Alistair MacGregor | 26,968 | 42.78 | +6.73 | $49,798.01 |
| Conservative | Alana DeLong | 17,870 | 28.35 | +2.35 | $51,680.34 |
| Liberal | Blair Herbert | 10,320 | 16.37 | +0.58 | $28,769.73 |
| People's | Mark Hecht | 3,952 | 6.27 | +4.64 | $13,032.24 |
| Green | Lia Versaevel | 3,922 | 6.22 | –13.99 | $6,881.80 |
| Total valid votes/expense limit | | 63,032 | 99.52 | – | $125,299.84 |
| Total rejected ballots | | 306 | 0.48 | +0.05 | |
| Turnout | | 63,338 | 63.96 | –5.92 | |
| Eligible voters | | 99,024 | | | |
| New Democratic hold | | Swing | | | |
Source: Elections Canada

2019 Canadian federal election
| Party | Candidate | Votes | % | ±% | Expenditures |
|---|---|---|---|---|---|
| New Democratic | Alistair MacGregor | 23,519 | 36.06 | +0.12 | $85,558.94 |
| Conservative | Alana DeLong | 16,959 | 26.00 | +3.19 | $45,957.36 |
| Green | Lydia Hwitsum | 13,181 | 20.21 | +3.27 | $58,460.55 |
| Liberal | Blair Herbert | 10,301 | 15.79 | –7.98 | $25,800.21 |
| People's | Rhonda Chen | 1,066 | 1.63 | – | $8,389.99 |
| Christian Heritage | Robin Morton Stanbridge | 202 | 0.31 | – | $1,993.05 |
| Total valid votes/expense limit | | 65,228 | 99.57 | – | $117,241.30 |
| Total rejected ballots | | 282 | 0.43 | +0.06 | |
| Turnout | | 65,510 | 69.88 | –5.84 | |
| Eligible voters | | 93,745 | | | |
| New Democratic hold | | Swing | | –1.53 | |
Source: Elections Canada

2015 Canadian federal election
| Party | Candidate | Votes | % | ±% | Expenditures |
|---|---|---|---|---|---|
| New Democratic | Alistair MacGregor | 22,200 | 35.94 | –7.65 | $104,734.63 |
| Liberal | Luke Krayenhoff | 14,685 | 23.77 | +17.97 | $21,780.35 |
| Conservative | Martin Barker | 14,091 | 22.81 | –20.25 | $77,247.07 |
| Green | Fran Hunt-Jinnouchi | 10,462 | 16.93 | +9.71 | $99,481.30 |
| Marxist–Leninist | Alastair Haythornthwaite | 340 | 0.55 | – | none listed |
| Total valid votes/expense limit | | 61,778 | 99.63 | | $214,942.07 |
| Total rejected ballots | | 230 | 0.37 | – | |
| Turnout | | 62,008 | 75.72 | – | |
| Eligible voters | | 81,888 | | | |
| New Democratic hold | | Swing | | –12.81 | |
Source: Elections Canada

2011 federal election redistributed results
| Party | Vote | % |
|---|---|---|
| New Democratic | 20,818 | 43.6 |
| Conservative | 20,565 | 43.1 |
| Green | 3,452 | 7.2 |
| Liberal | 2,772 | 5.8 |
| Others | 153 | 0.3 |

== See also ==
- List of Canadian electoral districts
- Historical federal electoral districts of Canada
