= Roy Wilson (Canadian politician) =

Canadian politician

Roy Gardiner Wilson

Member of the Legislative Assembly of Alberta
- In office 1971–1975
- Preceded by: New district
- Succeeded by: Neil Webber
- Constituency: Calgary-Bow

Personal details
- Born: May 4, 1932 (age 94) Coronation, Alberta
- Party: Social Credit
- Spouse: Erma Wilson
- Occupation: Real estate agent, politician

Roy Gardiner Wilson (born May 4, 1932) is a politician from Alberta, Canada. He served in the Legislative Assembly of Alberta from 1971 to 1975 as a member of the Social Credit caucus in official opposition.

== Early life ==
Wilson graduated from Olds College in 1951. He later married his girlfriend Erma who graduated in the same class at Olds. They had two children, Keith and Shannon.

== Political career ==
Wilson first ran for a seat to the Alberta Legislature for the first time in the 1967 general election, in the electoral district of Banff-Cochrane. He was defeated by independent candidate Clarence Copithorne.

Wilson ran again in the 1971 general election, in the electoral district of Calgary-Bow. He defeated Bill Wearmouth of the Progressive Conservatives by about a thousand votes.

In the 1975 general election Wilson was defeated by Neil Webber of the Progressive Conservatives.

== Late life ==
After his defeat, Wilson served as chairman of the Olds College Foundation from 1982 to 1984. He was inducted into the Olds College Hall of Fame. He has held a wide variety of positions in real estate and community organizations, including the presidency of the Alberta Real Estate Association, the Calgary Real Estate Board Charitable Foundation, the Calgary Planning Advisory Committee, the Calgary Police Commission and the Fraser Institute.
