= Jeff Kibble =

Canadian politician

Jeff Kibble MP

Member of Parliament for Cowichan—Malahat—Langford
- Incumbent
- Assumed office April 28, 2025
- Preceded by: Alistair MacGregor

Personal details
- Party: Conservative
- Website: https://jeffkibble.ca

Jeffrey Andrew Kibble MP is a Canadian politician who has served as a Member of Parliament for Cowichan—Malahat—Langford since 2025. A member of the Conservative Party, he was elected in the 2025 federal election. He is a Royal Canadian Navy veteran, having served for 28 years.

At the time of the 2025 Canadian federal election, he lived in Langford.

== Electoral record ==
2025 Canadian federal election: Cowichan—Malahat—Langford
Party	Candidate	Votes	%	±%	Expenditures
Conservative	Jeff Kibble	28,370	37.24	+8.88	$90,618.71
New Democratic	Alistair MacGregor	24,826	32.59	–10.19	$88,603.95
Liberal	Blair Herbert	21,478	28.20	+11.82	$43,476.51
Green	Kathleen Code	1,500	1.97	–4.25	$4,702.67
Total valid votes/expense limit		76,174	99.53	–	$149,526.18
Total rejected ballots		361	0.47	–0.01	
Turnout		76,535	72.41	+8.45	
Eligible voters		105,698			
Conservative notional gain		Swing			
Source: Elections Canada
