= Len Skowronski =

Canadian politician (1940–2024)

Leader of the Alberta Social Credit Party
- In office 2007–2016
- Preceded by: Lavern Ahlstrom
- Succeeded by: Jeremy Fraser

Personal details
- Born: Leonard Michael Skowronski; September 8, 1940 Radway, Alberta, Canada
- Died: March 29, 2024 (aged 83) Calgary, Alberta, Canada
- Party: Alberta Social Credit Party
- Spouse: Nadie
- Children: 2

Leonard Michael Skowronski (September 8, 1940 – March 29, 2024) was a Canadian politician who was the leader of the provincial Social Credit Party in Alberta, Canada, between 2007 and 2016. He was elected at a leadership convention held on November 3, 2007 in Red Deer to replace Lavern Ahlstrom who resigned.

Skowronski lived in Calgary, and ran as a candidate in the 2004 Alberta election as a Social Credit candidate in Calgary Varsity. He was defeated, finishing last in a field of six candidates. He contested the 2008 election in the electoral district of Calgary-Bow and again finished last in a field of six. He contested the 2009 by-election in Calgary-Glenmore, placing sixth out of seven candidates, and receiving 28 votes more than the independent candidate who placed seventh.

In 2016, Skowronski denounced the "invalid takeover" of the party by anti-abortion activists leading to his replacement as party leader by Jeremy Fraser.

Skowronski died on March 29, 2024, at the age of 83.

== Electoral record ==
2015 Alberta general election: Calgary-Hawkwood
Party	Candidate	Votes	%	±%
New Democratic	Michael Connolly	7,443	36.35%	31.63%
Progressive Conservative	Jason Luan	6,378	31.15%	-15.95%
Wildrose	Jae Shim	4,448	21.72%	-14.68%
Alberta Party	Beth Barberree	925	4.52%	3.26%
Liberal	Harbaksh Singh Sekhon	736	3.59%	-4.86%
Green	Polly Knowlton Cockett	455	2.22%	1.19%
Social Credit	Len Skowronski	90	0.44%	-0.09%
Total		20,475	–	–
Rejected, spoiled and declined		68	–	–
Eligible electors / turnout		33,523	61.28%	3.50%
New Democratic gain from Progressive Conservative		Swing		-2.75%
Source(s) Source: "15 - Calgary-Hawkwood Official Results 2015 Alberta general election". officialresults.elections.ab.ca. Elections Alberta.

Party political offices
Preceded by Lavern Ahlstrom	Social Credit Party of Alberta Leader; 2007–2016	Succeeded by Jeremy Fraser
