= Bonnie Laing =

Canadian politician

MLA for Calgary-Bow
- In office 1989–2001
- Preceded by: Neil Webber
- Succeeded by: Alana DeLong

Personal details
- Born: Bonnie Mary Sheila Paul; March 30, 1937 Calgary, Alberta
- Died: November 11, 2016 (aged 79) Bowcrest Care Centre, Calgary, Alberta
- Party: Progressive Conservative
- Spouse: Wyatt B. Laing
- Occupation: Educator, politician, health care professional

Bonnie Mary Sheila Laing (née Paul; March 30, 1937 – November 11, 2016) was a teacher, politician and health care professional from Alberta, Canada.

== Early life ==
Bonnie Laing had a career as an educator for 26 years; she left that role when she ran for public office in 1989.

== Political career ==
Laing ran for public office in the 1989 Alberta general election. She won a hotly contested three-way race that saw each candidate in the electoral district of Calgary-Bow pick up 30% of the popular vote. Laing finished first, defeating Tim Bardsley and Scott Jeffery of the Liberals and NDP.

Laing won her second term in office in the 1993 Alberta general election with a much larger margin, defeating six other candidates and winning almost 47% of the popular vote. She was re-elected to her third and final term in the 1997 Alberta general election by her biggest margin, defeating four other candidates and winning 54% of the popular vote.

During her time in office Laing served on the Alberta Alcohol and Drug Abuse Commission. She also served as the co-chair on the government's Special Task Force on Province-Wide Health Services. Laing also chaired the province's 1997 Health System Funding Review Committee.

== Later career and death ==
After leaving politics, Laing was appointed chair of the Health Utilization and Outcomes Commission. She continued to serve as vice-chair after the commission was renamed the Health Quality Council of Alberta.

Laing died on November 11, 2016, at the age of 79 at the Bowcrest Care Centre in Calgary.

Legislative Assembly of Alberta
Preceded by Neil Webber	MLA Calgary-Bow; 1989-2001	Succeeded by Alana DeLong
