= Neil Webber =

Canadian politician

The Honourable P. Neil Webber ECA

MLA for Calgary-Bow
- In office 1975–1989
- Preceded by: Roy Wilson
- Succeeded by: Bonnie Laing

Personal details
- Born: Patrick Neil Webber; April 17, 1936 (age 90) Hanna, Alberta
- Party: Progressive Conservative
- Relations: Len Webber (son)
- Occupation: educator, former politician

Patrick Neil Webber (born April 17, 1936) is a former provincial level politician and cabinet minister from Alberta, Canada.

== Political career ==
Born in 1936 in Hanna, Alberta, Webber was elected to the Legislative Assembly of Alberta in the 1975 Alberta general election to pick up the electoral district of Calgary-Bow for the Progressive Conservatives. Webber defeated incumbent Roy Wilson who held the district for Social Credit.

Webber was re-elected to his second term in office with a landslide majority in the 1979 Alberta general election. He defeated four other candidates winning well over 70% of the popular vote. Webber won his third term in office in the 1982 Alberta general election. In this election he defeated four other candidates winning the highest popular vote of his political career.

Webber was re-elected to his fourth and final term in the 1986 Alberta general election. He defeated Scott Jeffry from the NDP and two other candidates in his most closely contested election since he came to office in 1975. He retired from office in 1989.

During his time in office, Webber was appointed to the provincial cabinet as Minister of Community Health.

His son Len Webber served as the former Member of Parliament for the electoral district of Calgary Confederation.

Upon retirement, Webber founded Webber Academy.

Legislative Assembly of Alberta
| Preceded by Roy Wilson | MLA Calgary-Bow; 1975-1989 | Succeeded by Bonnie Laing |
