= Webber High School =

Webber High School may refer to:

- Webber Township High School in Bluford, Illinois
- Webber High School in Eastover, South Carolina, a former high school for African Americans
- L A Webber Middle-High School in Lyndonville, New York

== See also ==
- Weber High School, in Pleasant View, Utah
- Weber High School (Chicago), a defunct school
- The Weber School, a high school in Georgia
- Webber Academy, a school in Calgary, Alberta, Canada
