= Jordan Wilkie =

Canadian firefighter and politician (born 1982)

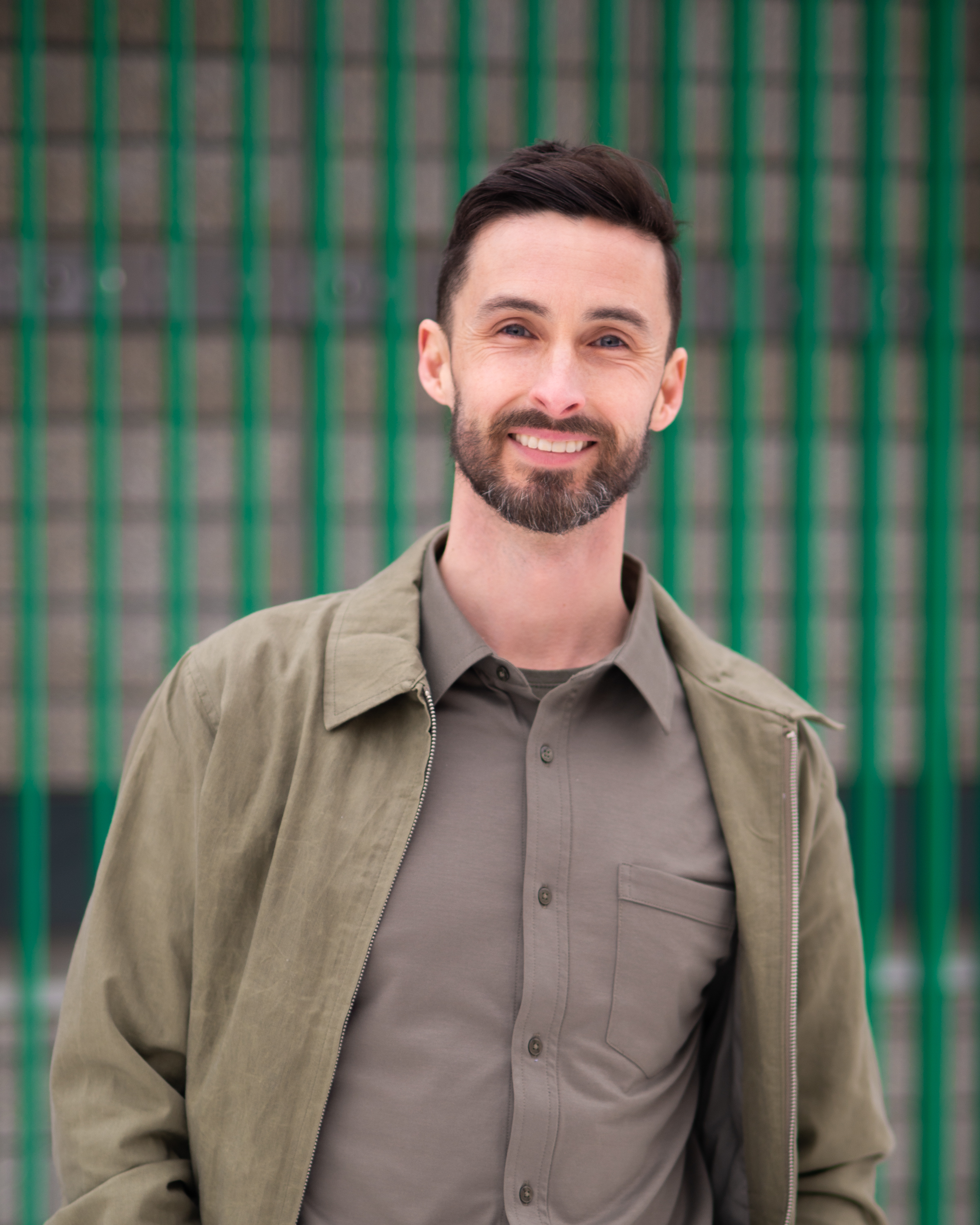
- Wilkie in 2023

Leader of the Green Party of Alberta
- In office March 28, 2020 – September 18, 2023
- Preceded by: William Carnegie (interim)
- Succeeded by: James Anderson

Personal details
- Born: February 21, 1982 (age 44)
- Party: Green Party

Jordan Wilkie (born February 21, 1982) is a Canadian firefighter and politician formerly based in the city of Edmonton. He is a former leader of the Green Party of Alberta.

== Early life and education ==
Jordan Wilkie was born in Edmonton, Alberta, the son of professional ice hockey player Ian Wilkie. He is the grandson of aviation pioneer Max Ward.

He holds a Bachelor of Arts in philosophy from the University of Western Ontario and a masters in disaster emergency management from Royal Roads University, British Columbia.

== Career ==
Wilkie began his firefighting career in 2008, and in 2011, he took part in the response to the Slave Lake wildfire. He was also involved in the 2013 Calgary flood assistance program, and in 2016, volunteered with the Red Cross emergency response team during the 2016 Fort McMurray wildfire.

=== Green Party of Alberta leadership ===
On March 28, 2020, Wilkie was elected leader of the Green Party of Alberta. After assuming the role, Wilkie established the party's first shadow cabinet.

=== 2023 Alberta general election ===
As the Green Party's leader, Wilkie ran for the position of premier in the upcoming 2023 Alberta general election, scheduled for May 29.

Wilkie ran in the riding of Edmonton-Rutherford for the provincial election. While unsuccessful in winning the seat, Wilkie led the Green Party of Alberta to their best results since the refounding of the party, doubling their number of votes received from the 2019 general election to 14,085 in 2023.

=== Resignation ===
Wilkie resigned as party leader on September 18, 2023, after moving to British Columbia.

== Electoral history ==
=== 2023 Alberta general election ===
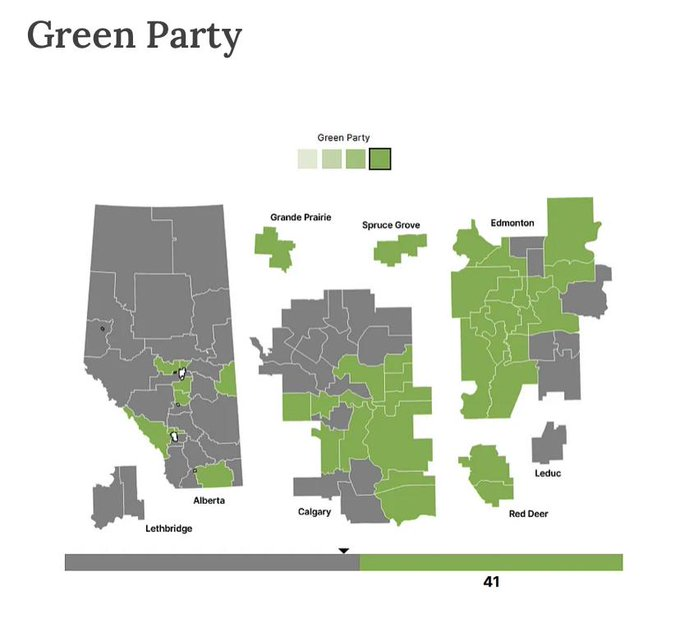
Map of Green candidates in the 2023 Alberta General Election

2023 Alberta general election: Edmonton-Rutherford
Party	Candidate	Votes	%	±%
New Democratic	Jodi Calahoo Stonehouse	13,012	65.05	+10.24
United Conservative	Laine Larson	6,366	31.83	-3.07
Green	Jordan Wilkie	624	3.12	+2.26
Total		20,002	99.26	–
Rejected and declined		150	0.74	
Turnout		20,152	63.52	
Eligible voters		31,726		
New Democratic hold		Swing		+6.65
Source(s) Source: Elections Alberta

=== Electoral record ===
Election	Leader	Candidates	Votes	%	Seats	+/-	Position	Government
2023	Jordan Wilkie	41 / 87	13,458	0.76%	0 / 87	0	▲3rd	Extra-parliamentary
