= Webber Academy =

- Webber Academiae

Location
- 1515 – 93rd Street, S.W. Calgary; Calgary, Alberta; Canada; 51.0446°N 114.2261°W

Information
- School type: Private
- Motto: Parantibus Alumni Universitatis convalescunt et ultra (Preparing Students to Thrive in University and Beyond)
- Founded: 1997
- Founder: Neil Webber
- CEEB code: 820242
- Principal: Christina Clouston
- Grades: JK-12
- Years offered: JK-12
- Enrollment: 1,017
- Average class size: 21
- Student to teacher ratio: 1:20
- Education system: Full year
- Classes offered: Math, AP Calculus, AP English Literature, AP English Language, AP Biology, AP Physics, AP Chemistry, AP Statistics, AP European History, AP World History, French, Spanish, Mandarin, Art, AP Art, Drama, Computer Applications, Physical Education, Computer Programming
- Classrooms: ~40
- Campus size: 47 acres
- Houses: 4
- Colour
- Slogan: "Preparing students to thrive in university and beyond."
- Mascot: Wiley the Wildcat
- Publication: Voices Magazine
- School fees: 15,500 baseline fee

Webber Academy is a non-denominational, co-educational, university preparatory, private school located in Calgary, Alberta, Canada. Webber Academy offers academics spanning from junior kindergarten through grade 12. It was founded in 1997 by Dr. Neil Webber, a former teacher and professor at Mount Royal University, who also served as an Alberta Cabinet Minister in the Hon. Peter Lougheed and Hon. Don Getty governments.

The campus consists of a junior kindergarten and senior kindergarten facility, a main building with elementary and senior school wings, third floor science centre, two full-size gymnasiums, an outdoor sports court, several playgrounds and a 400-meter running track. The school is situated on a 47-acre campus in southwest Calgary, currently home to 1017 students (as of November 2026). There is a performing arts centre built for the drama and music programmes, and its 500-seat theatre and dressing rooms can be rented out for public events.

== Criticism ==
In 2012, two Muslim students were denied the right to privately pray on campus grounds. The students continued to conduct their prayers outside the building, but were repeatedly interrupted and questioned by campus staff. After a filed complaint, a human rights tribunal decided that "despite [Webber]'s specifically stated goal of making people of all religious backgrounds feel welcome, its actions, objectively viewed, were not welcoming." Webber Academy refused to re-enroll the students the following school year, and the students were awarded $26,000 in damages by the Alberta Human Rights Commission in 2015.

In 2018, Alberta Education discontinued an online resource that included a question regarding positive effects of residential schools. Dr. Neil Webber, president of the academy, noted that "[Webber's Staff] want our teachers to discuss both positive and negative aspects of [residential schools]." In the same interview, Webber also mentioned "Whether it's slavery in the U.S. or Canada's relationship with Iraq or Iran, I think...you need to consider both the positive and negative benefits."
