= Janet Keeping =

Canadian politician

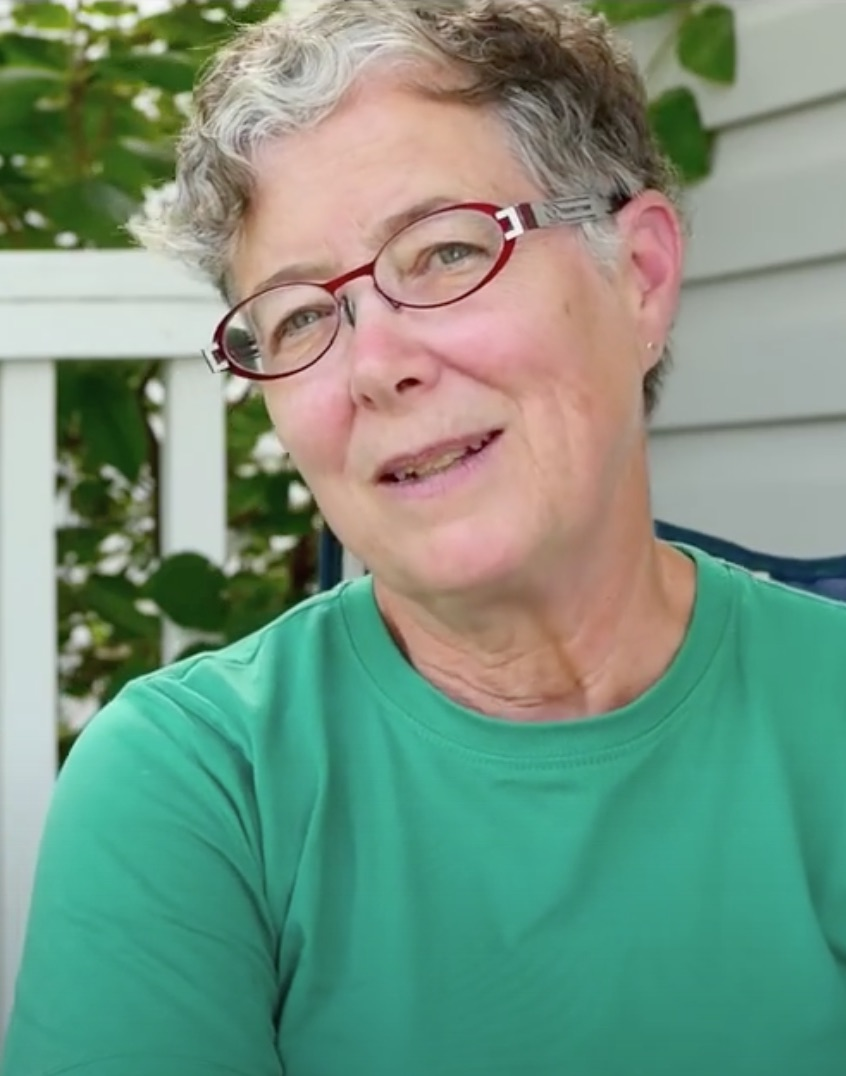
- Janet Keeping, 2015

Leader of the Green Party of Alberta
- In office 2012–2017
- Preceded by: Larry Ashmore (interim)
- Succeeded by: Romy Tittel

Personal details
- Party: Green Party
- Education: Massachusetts Institute of Technology, University of Calgary

Janet Keeping is a Canadian professor and politician who was the Leader of the Green Party of Alberta, serving in this capacity from September 2012 to November 2017. Keeping was born in Montreal and has lived in Calgary since 1973.

She attended the Massachusetts Institute of Technology, earning a B.S. in architecture in 1971, and then studied environmental design. Keeping moved from Boston to Calgary in 1973 and earned a master's degree in philosophy prior to being admitted to the law school at the University of Calgary, where she graduated with a first law degree in 1981.

Keeping co-founded the Alberta Civil Liberties Research Centre where she was its first executive director and was, from 1984 to 2006, a Research Fellow at the Canadian Institute of Resources Law (CIRL), housed at The Faculty of Law, University of Calgary. While at CIRL Janet Keeping was Director of Russian Programs and led several studies funded by the Canadian International Development Agency in which she visited Russia and collaborated with Russian lawyers and scholars. Additionally, she was President of the Sheldon Chumir Foundation for Ethics in Leadership at the Centre for Constitutional Studies from 2006 to 2012.

Janet Keeping has lectured at The Faculty of Law, University of Calgary and was named honorary professor at the Faculty of Law, Tyumen State University during her time there as CIRL's Director of Russian Programs. In recognition of her legal work and scholarship, Keeping was awarded the Medal of Service by the Academic Council of Tomsk State University.

In September 2015, she was a by-election candidate in the district of Calgary-Foothills, but finished sixth with 3% of the vote. Keeping was endorsed as Leader of the Green Party of Alberta by Elizabeth May, the leader of the Green Party of Canada.

Janet Keeping lives in Calgary's Hillhurst community where she raised three children with her husband.

== Election results ==
2015 Alberta general election: Calgary-Foothills
Party	Candidate	Votes	%	±%
Progressive Conservative	Jim Prentice	7,163	40.33%	-18.04%
New Democratic	Anne Wilson	5,748	32.36%	28.61%
Wildrose	Keelan Frey	3,216	18.11%	-11.83%
Liberal	Ali Bin Zahid	1,271	7.16%	-3.29%
Green	Janet Keeping	363	2.04%	-0.05%
Total		17,761	–	–
Rejected, spoiled and declined		52	28	13
Eligible electors / turnout		34,000	52.43%	
Progressive Conservative hold		Swing		-6.15%
Source(s) Because Jim Prentice disclaimed his right to become an MLA before the end of the appeal period for the official results, this riding's election was declared void. Source: "11 - Calgary-Foothills, 2015 Alberta general election". officialresults.elections.ab.ca. Elections Alberta. Chief Electoral Officer (2016). 2015 General Election. A Report of the Chief Electoral Officer (PDF) (Report). Edmonton, Alta.: Elections Alberta.

Alberta provincial by-election, September 3, 2015: Calgary-Foothills Voiding of general election results due to Jim Prentice disclaiming his seat
Party	Candidate	Votes	%	±%
Wildrose	Prasad Panda	4,877	38.35	+20.24
New Democratic	Bob Hawkesworth	3,270	25.71	-6.65
Progressive Conservative	Blair Houston	2,746	21.59	-18.74
Liberal	Ali Bin Zahid	791	6.22	-0.94
Alberta Party	Mark Taylor	610	4.80	+4.80
Green	Janet Keeping	377	2.96	+0.92
Independent	Antoni Grochowski	46	0.36	–
Total valid votes		12,717		
Total rejected, unmarked and declined ballots				
Turnout			39.48	
Eligible voters		32,212		
Wildrose gain from Progressive Conservative		Swing		+19.49
