= Green Party of Alberta =

Provincial political party in Canada

- Active provincial party
- Leader: James Anderson
- President: Ian Hopfe
- Deputy leader: Ian Hopfe
- Founded: December 22, 2011; 14 years ago
- Preceded by: Alberta Greens
- Headquarters: Calgary, Alberta
- Youth wing: Young Greens Council
- Ideology: Green politics
- Political position: Centre-left
- International affiliation: Global Greens
- Colours: Green
- Seats in Legislature: 0 / 87

Website
- greenpartyofalberta.ca

The Green Party of Alberta (GPA, French: Parti vert de l'Alberta) is a registered political party in Alberta, Canada, that is allied with the Green Party of Canada, and the other provincial Green parties. The party was registered by Elections Alberta on December 22, 2011 to replace the deregistered Alberta Greens; the party ran its first candidates for office in the 2012 provincial election under the name Evergreen Party of Alberta. The party changed its name to "Green Party of Alberta" on November 1, 2012.

== History ==
Following a dispute of the leadership of the Alberta Greens in 2008, George Read withdrew as leader and Joe Anglin remained as interim leader. On April 1, 2009, the executive of the party failed to file an annual financial statement with Elections Alberta, as required by law, and was deregistered on July 16, 2009. Some of its members joined the Alberta Party and Wildrose Party, while others formed the Vision 2012 Society.

The independent group, dedicated to green principles, formed the legal entity required by Elections Alberta to register a political party. An annual general meeting was held on June 25, 2011, in Red Deer to elect an executive, and to raise a petition asking Elections Alberta to register a new party. The petition was signed by 8,500 people, more than the required 7,000, and on December 22, 2011, the "Evergreen Party of Alberta" was registered. According to Elections Alberta rules, the party could not use a name used by another party until the name went unused for a general election.

After contesting the 2012 general election under the Evergreen banner, the party voted at its annual general meeting, on September 29, 2012, to change its name to "Green Party of Alberta". Elections Alberta approved the name change and it became effective 1 November 2012.

On March 28, 2020, Jordan Wilkie was elected as the new leader of the party.

The Green Party of Alberta had its best result since the creation of the new party in the 2023 Alberta general election. They placed third above the Alberta Party.

On September 18, 2023, Wilkie resigned as party leader.

After two years of vacant leadership, James Anderson was appointed as the interim leader by the GPA Executive Council on November 22, 2025. On June 7, 2026, Anderson was voted in as the permanent leader.

== Platform ==
The party bases its principles on the Charter of the Global Greens. Those principles are:

- Ecological wisdom
- Non-violence
- Participatory democracy
- Respect for diversity
- Social justice
- Sustainability

== Election results ==
=== General elections ===
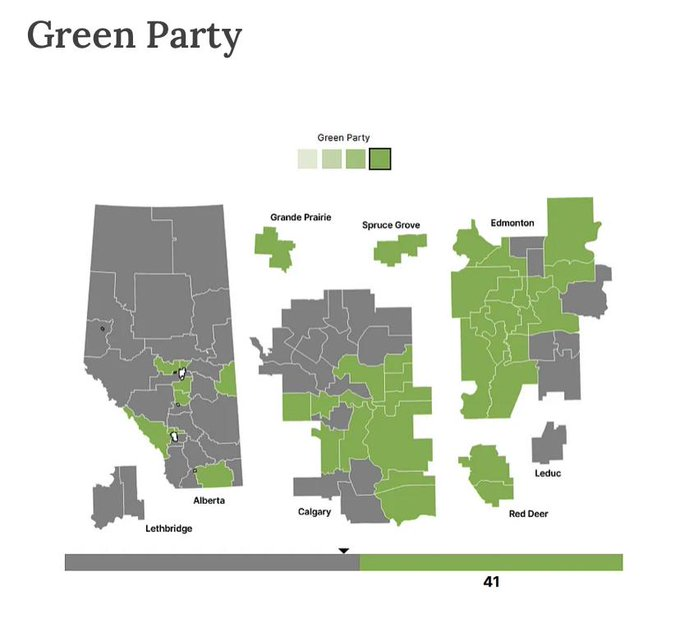
Map of Green Candidates in the 2023 Alberta General Election

Election	Banner	Leader	Candidates	Votes	%	Seats	±	Position	Government
See Alberta Greens 1993–2009
2012	Evergreen	Larry Ashmore	25 / 87	5,082	0.39%	0 / 87	0	▼6th	Extra-parliamentary
2015	Green	Janet Keeping	28 / 87	7,321	0.49%	0 / 87	0	6th	Extra-parliamentary
2019	Green	Cheryle Chagnon-Greyeyes	32 / 87	7,687	0.41%	0 / 87	0	▼7th	Extra-parliamentary
2023	Green	Jordan Wilkie	41 / 87	13,457	0.8%	0 / 87	0	▲3rd	Extra-parliamentary

=== By-elections ===
Banner	By-election	Date	Candidate	Votes	%	Place
Green	Edmonton-Whitemud	October 27, 2014	René Malenfant	95	0.67%	6/6
Green	Calgary-Foothills	October 27, 2014	Polly Knowlton Cockett	248	2.09%	5/7
Green	Calgary-Foothills	September 3, 2015	Janet Keeping	378	2.97%	6/7
Green	Calgary-Greenway	March 22, 2016	Thana Boonlert	166	2.01%	5/8
Green	Calgary-Lougheed	December 14, 2017	Romy Tittel	60	0.55%	5/7
Green	Fort McMurray-Conklin	July 12, 2018	Brian Deheer	29	0.72%	5/5

=== Alberta Senate nominee elections ===
Election	Banner	Votes	%	Elected
2012	Evergreen	149,844	5.6%	0 / 1

== Leaders ==
James Anderson, leader from 2025-present

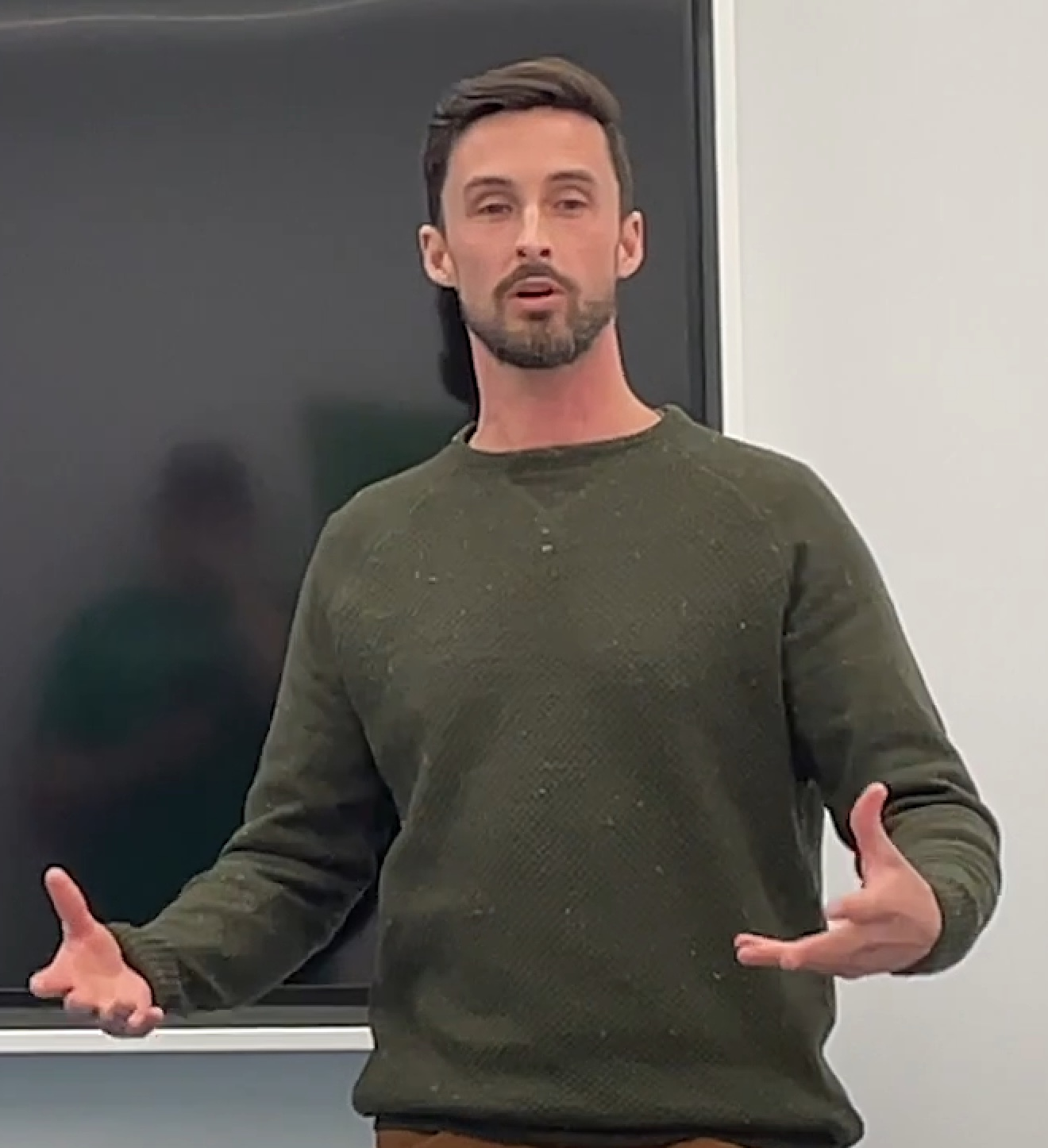
Jordan Wilkie, leader from 2020–2023

Leader	Term of office		Notes
Larry Ashmore	2011	2012	Interim
Janet Keeping	2012	2017	
Romy Tittel	November 4, 2017	March 24, 2018	
Coral Bliss Taylor	April 18, 2018	September 2018	Interim
Cheryle Chagnon-Greyeyes	September 22, 2018	September 30, 2019	
William Carnegie	October 1, 2019	March 28, 2020	Interim
Jordan Wilkie	March 28, 2020	September 18, 2023	
James Anderson	November 22, 2025	present	Interim Leader from November 22, 2025 to June 6, 2026. Elected Leader on June 7, 2026.

== See also ==
- Alberta Greens
- Alberta Greens candidates in Alberta provincial elections
- List of Alberta general elections
- List of Green party leaders in Canada
- List of Green politicians who have held office in Canada
- List of political parties in Alberta
- Politics of Alberta
