= Edmonton-Parkallen =

Defunct provincial electoral district in Alberta, Canada

Coordinates: 53.503°N 113.516°W

Alberta electoral district

Defunct provincial electoral district
- Legislature: Legislative Assembly of Alberta
- District created: 1971
- District abolished: 1993
- First contested: 1971
- Last contested: 1989

Edmonton-Parkallen was a provincial electoral district in Alberta, Canada, mandated to return a single member to the Legislative Assembly of Alberta using the first past the post method of voting from 1971 to 1993.

== History ==
The Edmonton-Parkallen electoral district was formed in the 1970 boundary redistribution from Strathcona West and a small portion of Strathcona Centre.

The Edmonton-Kingsway electoral district was abolished in the 1993 boundary redistribution with portions going into the already existing Edmonton-Strathcona and Edmonton-Whitemud electoral districts, and a portion going to the newly formed Edmonton-Rutherford electoral district.

=== Members of the Legislative Assembly (MLAs) ===
Members of the Legislative Assembly for Edmonton-Parkallen
Assembly	Years	Member	Party
See Strathcona West electoral district from 1959-1971 and Strathcona Centre electoral district from 1959-1971
17th	1971–1975	Neil Stanley Crawford	Progressive Conservative
18th	1975–1979	Neil Stanley Crawford	Progressive Conservative
19th	1979–1982	Neil Stanley Crawford	Progressive Conservative
20th	1982–1986	Neil Stanley Crawford	Progressive Conservative
21st	1986–1989	Neil Stanley Crawford	Progressive Conservative
21st	1986–1989	Doug Main	Progressive Conservative
See Edmonton-Strathcona electoral district from 1971-Present, Edmonton-Rutherford electoral district from 1993-Present and Edmonton-Whitemud electoral district from 1971-Present

== Election results ==
=== 1971 ===
1971 Alberta general election
Party	Candidate	Votes	%	±%
Progressive Conservative	Neil Stanley Crawford	5,300	49.50%	–
Social Credit	Gordon V. Rasmussen	3,875	36.19%	–
New Democratic	Hart Horn	1,311	12.24%	–
Liberal	Vic Yanda	221	2.06%	–
Total		10,707	–	–
Rejected, spoiled and declined		104	–	–
Eligible electors / turnout		14,815	72.97%	–
Progressive Conservative pickup new district.				
Source(s) Source: "Edmonton-Parkallen Official Results 1971 Alberta general election". Alberta Heritage Community Foundation.

=== 1975 ===
1975 Alberta general election
Party	Candidate	Votes	%	±%
Progressive Conservative	Neil Stanley Crawford	4,810	62.30%	12.80%
New Democratic	Brian Fish	1,546	20.02%	7.78%
Social Credit	Glen Carlson	904	11.71%	-24.48%
Liberal	Brian Erickson	461	5.97%	3.91%
Total		7,721	–	–
Rejected, spoiled and declined		15	–	–
Eligible electors / turnout		19,583	39.50%	–
Progressive Conservative hold		Swing		14.48%
Source(s) Source: "Edmonton-Parkallen Official Results 1975 Alberta general election". Alberta Heritage Community Foundation.

=== 1979 ===
1979 Alberta general election
Party	Candidate	Votes	%	±%
Progressive Conservative	Neil Stanley Crawford	6,457	50.58%	-11.72%
New Democratic	Jim Russell	4,102	32.13%	12.11%
Social Credit	Morley MacCalder	1,483	11.62%	-0.09%
Liberal	Phillip Lister	724	5.67%	-0.30%
Total		12,766	–	–
Rejected, spoiled and declined		N/A	–	–
Eligible electors / turnout		19,583	65.19%	–
Progressive Conservative hold		Swing		-11.91%
Source(s) Source: "Edmonton-Parkallen Official Results 1979 Alberta general election". Alberta Heritage Community Foundation.

=== 1982 ===
1982 Alberta general election
Party	Candidate	Votes	%	±%
Progressive Conservative	Neil Stanley Crawford	8229	55.37%	4.79%
New Democratic	Jim Russell	5,771	38.83%	6.70%
Western Canada Concept	Merv Gray	823	5.54%	–
Communist	Chris Frazer	39	0.26%	–
Total		14,862	–	–
Rejected, spoiled and declined		19	–	–
Eligible electors / turnout		20,154	73.84%	–
Progressive Conservative hold		Swing		-0.95%
Source(s) Source: "Edmonton-Parkallen Official Results 1982 Alberta general election". Alberta Heritage Community Foundation.

=== 1986 ===
1986 Alberta general election
Party	Candidate	Votes	%	±%
Progressive Conservative	Neil Stanley Crawford	5,612	44.49%	-10.88%
New Democratic	Jim Russell	5,310	42.09%	3.26%
Liberal	Jerry Paschen	1,100	8.72%	–
Representative	James Carson	593	4.70%	–
Total		12,615	–	–
Rejected, spoiled and declined		16	–	–
Eligible electors / turnout		23,675	53.35%	–
Progressive Conservative hold		Swing		-7.07%
Source(s) Source: "Edmonton-Parkallen Official Results 1986 Alberta general election". Alberta Heritage Community Foundation.

=== 1989 ===
1989 Alberta general election
Party	Candidate	Votes	%	±%
Progressive Conservative	Doug Main	6,169	40.19%	-4.30%
New Democratic	Jim Selby	4,979	32.43%	-9.66%
Liberal	Nadene Thomas	4,203	27.38%	18.66%
Total		15,351	–	–
Rejected, spoiled and declined		48	–	–
Eligible electors / turnout		24,312	63.34%	–
Progressive Conservative hold		Swing		2.68%
Source(s) Source: "Edmonton-Parkallen Official Results 1989 Alberta general election". Alberta Heritage Community Foundation.

== See also ==
- List of Alberta provincial electoral districts
- Canadian provincial electoral districts
- Parkallen, a community in Edmonton
