= Getty ministry =

Cabinet of Alberta, 1985–1992

Getty Ministry
- 11th ministry of Alberta
- Date formed: November 1, 1985
- Date dissolved: December 14, 1992

People and organisations
- Monarch: Elizabeth II
- Lieutenant Governor: Helen Hunley; Gordon Towers
- Premier: Don Getty
- Member party: Progressive Conservative
- Status in legislature: Majority

History
- Legislature terms: 20th Alberta Legislature; 21st Alberta Legislature; 22nd Alberta Legislature
- Predecessor: Lougheed Ministry
- Successor: Klein Ministry

The Getty Ministry was the combined Cabinet (called Executive Council of Alberta), chaired by Premier Don Getty, and Ministers that governed Alberta from the mid-point of the 20th Alberta Legislature from November 1, 1985, to nearly the end of the 22nd Alberta Legislature until December 14, 1992.

The Executive Council (commonly known as the cabinet) was made up of members of the Progressive Conservative Party of Alberta which held a majority of seats in the Legislative Assembly of Alberta. The cabinet was appointed by the Lieutenant Governor of Alberta on the advice of the Premier.

== List of ministers ==
Name		Date Appointed	Date Departed
Don Getty	President of the Executive Council (Premier)	November 1, 1985	December 14, 1992
David John Russell	Deputy Premier	February 6, 1986	April 13, 1989
Jim Horsman	Deputy Premier	April 14, 1989	December 14, 1992
Lou Hyndman	Provincial Treasurer	March 23, 1979	May 25, 1986
Archibald D. Johnston	Provincial Treasurer	May 26, 1986	December 14, 1992
Neil Stanley Crawford	Attorney General	March 23, 1979	May 25, 1986
Jim Horsman	Attorney General	May 26, 1986	September 7, 1988
Ken Rostad	Attorney General	September 8, 1988	December 14, 1992
Archibald D. Johnston	Minister of Advanced Education	November 19, 1982	May 25, 1986
David John Russell	Minister of Advanced Education	May 26, 1986	April 13, 1989
John Gogo	Minister of Advanced Education	April 14, 1989	December 14, 1992
LeRoy Fjordbotten	Minister of Agriculture	November 19, 1982	May 25, 1986
Peter Elzinga	Minister of Agriculture	May 26, 1986	April 13, 1989
Ernie Isley	Minister of Agriculture	April 14, 1989	December 14, 1992
Rick Orman	Minister of Career Development and Employment	September 12, 1986	September 7, 1988
Ken Kowalski	Minister of Career Development and Employment	September 8, 1988	April 13, 1989
Connie Osterman	Minister of Career Development and Employment	April 14, 1989	July 28, 1989
Norm Weiss	Minister of Career Development and Employment	September 18, 1989	December 14, 1992
Jim Dinning	Minister of Community and Occupational Health	May 26, 1986	September 7, 1988
Connie Osterman	Minister of Consumer and Corporate Affairs	November 19, 1982	February 5, 1986
Al Adair	Minister of Consumer and Corporate Affairs	February 6, 1986	May 25, 1986
Elaine McCoy	Minister of Consumer and Corporate Affairs	May 26, 1986	April 13, 1989
Dennis Anderson	Minister of Consumer and Corporate Affairs	April 14, 1989	December 14, 1992
Dennis Anderson	Minister of Culture	May 26, 1986	June 4, 1987
Dennis Anderson	Minister of Culture and Multiculturalism	June 5, 1987	September 9, 1987
Greg Stevens	Minister of Culture and Multiculturalism	September 10, 1987	April 13, 1989
Doug Main	Minister of Culture and Multiculturalism	April 14, 1989	December 14, 1992
Hugh Planche	Minister of Economic Development	October 1, 1979	May 25, 1986
Larry Shaben	Minister of Economic Development and Trade	May 26, 1986	April 13, 1989
Peter Elzinga	Minister of Economic Development and Trade	April 14, 1989	December 14, 1992
David Thomas King	Minister of Education	March 23, 1979	February 5, 1986
Neil Webber	Minister of Education	February 6, 1986	May 25, 1986
Nancy MacBeth	Minister of Education	May 26, 1986	September 7, 1988
Jim Dinning	Minister of Education	September 8, 1988	December 14, 1992
Neil Webber	Minister of Energy	May 26, 1986	April 13, 1989
Rick Orman	Minister of Energy	April 14, 1989	December 14, 1992
John Zaozirny	Minister of Energy and Natural Resources	November 19, 1982	May 25, 1986
John Oldring	Minister of Family and Social Services	April 14, 1989	December 14, 1992
Jim Horsman	Minister of Federal and Intergovernmental Affairs	November 19, 1982	December 14, 1992
Donald H. Sparrow	Minister of Forestry	February 6, 1986	May 25, 1986
Donald H. Sparrow	Minister of Forestry, Lands and Wildlife	May 26, 1986	September 9, 1987
LeRoy Fjordbotten	Minister of Forestry, Lands and Wildlife	September 10, 1987	December 14, 1992
Nancy MacBeth	Minister of Health	September 8, 1988	December 14, 1992
David John Russell	Minister of Hospitals and Medical Care	March 23, 1979	May 25, 1986
Marvin Moore	Minister of Hospitals and Medical Care	May 26, 1986	September 7, 1988
Larry Shaben	Minister of Housing	November 19, 1982	May 25, 1986
Horst Schmid	Minister of International Trade	November 19, 1982	February 5, 1986
Leslie Young	Minister of Labour	March 23, 1979	May 25, 1986
Ian Reid	Minister of Labour	May 26, 1986	September 7, 1988
Rick Orman	Minister of Labour	September 8, 1988	April 13, 1989
Elaine McCoy	Minister of Labour	April 14, 1989	December 14, 1992
Ernie Isley	Minister of Manpower	November 19, 1982	May 25, 1986
Rick Orman	Minister of Manpower	May 26, 1986	September 11, 1986
Julian Koziak	Minister of Municipal Affairs	November 19, 1982	May 25, 1986
Neil Stanley Crawford	Minister of Municipal Affairs	May 26, 1986	September 9, 1987
Dennis Anderson	Minister of Municipal Affairs	September 10, 1987	April 13, 1989
Raymond Speaker	Minister of Municipal Affairs	April 14, 1989	January 3, 1992
Dick Fowler	Minister of Municipal Affairs	February 24, 1992	December 14, 1992
Tom Chambers	Minister of Public Works, Supply and Services	November 19, 1982	May 25, 1986
Ernie Isley	Minister of Public Works, Supply and Services	May 26, 1986	April 13, 1989
Ken Kowalski	Minister of Public Works, Supply and Services	April 14, 1989	June 29, 1993
Peter Trynchy	Minister of Recreation and Parks	March 23, 1979	May 25, 1986
Norm Weiss	Minister of Recreation and Parks	May 26, 1986	April 13, 1989
Steve West	Minister of Recreation and Parks	April 14, 1989	February 23, 1992
Connie Osterman	Minister of Social Services	May 26, 1986	April 13, 1989
Neil Webber	Minister of Social Services and Community Health	November 19, 1982	February 5, 1986
Connie Osterman	Minister of Social Services and Community Health	February 6, 1986	May 25, 1986
Neil Stanley Crawford	Minister of Special Projects	September 10, 1987	April 13, 1989
David Thomas King	Minister of Technology, Research and Telecommunications	February 6, 1986	May 25, 1986
Leslie Young	Minister of Technology, Research and Telecommunications	May 26, 1986	April 13, 1989
Fred Stewart	Minister of Technology, Research and Telecommunications	April 14, 1989	December 14, 1992
Frederick Deryl Bradley	Minister of the Environment	November 19, 1982	May 25, 1986
Ken Kowalski	Minister of the Environment	May 26, 1986	September 7, 1988
Ian Reid	Minister of the Environment	September 8, 1988	April 13, 1989
Ralph Klein	Minister of the Environment	April 14, 1989	December 14, 1992
Horst Schmid	Minister of Tourism	February 6, 1986	May 25, 1986
LeRoy Fjordbotten	Minister of Tourism	May 26, 1986	September 9, 1987
Donald H. Sparrow	Minister of Tourism	September 10, 1987	February 23, 1992
Al Adair	Minister of Tourism and Small Business	March 23, 1979	February 5, 1986
Donald H. Sparrow	Minister of Tourism, Parks and Recreation	February 24, 1992	December 14, 1992
Marvin Moore	Minister of Transportation	November 19, 1982	May 25, 1986
Al Adair	Minister of Transportation and Utilities	May 26, 1986	December 14, 1992
Robert Bogle	Minister of Utilities	February 6, 1986	May 25, 1986
Robert Bogle	Minister of Utilities and Telecommunications	November 19, 1982	February 5, 1986
Mary LeMessurier	Minister Responsible for Culture	March 23, 1979	May 25, 1986
Milt Pahl	Minister Responsible for Native Affairs	November 19, 1982	May 25, 1986
Peter Trynchy	Minister Responsible for Occupational Health and Safety, and Workers' Compensation Board	April 14, 1989	December 14, 1992
Greg Stevens	Minister Responsible for Personnel Administration	March 23, 1979	May 25, 1986
Roy Brassard	Minister Responsible for Seniors	September 4, 1991	December 14, 1992
Bill Diachuk	Minister Responsible for Workers' Health, Safety and Compensation	March 23, 1979	May 25, 1986
William Edward Payne	Minister Without Portfolio	November 19, 1982	May 25, 1986
Ian Reid	Solicitor General	January 31, 1984	May 25, 1986
Ken Rostad	Solicitor General	May 26, 1986	September 7, 1988
Marvin Moore	Solicitor General	September 8, 1988	April 13, 1989
Dick Fowler	Solicitor General	April 14, 1989	February 23, 1992
Steve West	Solicitor General	February 24, 1992	December 14, 1992
Shirley Cripps	Associate Minister of Agriculture	May 26, 1986	April 13, 1989
Shirley McClellan	Associate Minister of Agriculture	April 14, 1989	February 23, 1992
Shirley McClellan	Associate Minister of Agriculture and Minister Responsible for Rural Development	February 24, 1992	December 14, 1992
Norm Weiss	Associate Minister of Family and Social Services	April 14, 1989	September 17, 1989
Roy Brassard	Associate Minister of Family and Social Services	September 18, 1989	September 3, 1991
Donald H. Sparrow	Associate Minister of Public Lands and Wildlife	November 19, 1982	February 5, 1986

== See also ==
- Executive Council of Alberta
- List of Alberta provincial ministers
