= Mike Percy =

Mike Percy may refer to:

- Mike Percy (musician), bass guitarist with Dead or Alive
- Mike Percy (politician), academic and former politician in Alberta, Canada
