= Fred Horne =

Canadian politician

The Honourable Fred Horne ECA

MLA for Edmonton-Rutherford
- In office March 3, 2008 – May 5, 2015
- Preceded by: Rick Miller
- Succeeded by: Richard Feehan

Minister of Health and Wellness
- In office 2011–2014
- Succeeded by: Stephen Mandel

Personal details
- Born: August 25, 1961 (age 65) Whitby, Ontario
- Party: Progressive Conservative
- Spouse: Jennifer
- Education: Royal Roads University; York University
- Occupation: health policy consultant

Frederick Thomas Horne ECA (born August 25, 1961) is a retired Canadian politician and former Member of the Legislative Assembly of Alberta for the constituency of Edmonton-Rutherford as a Progressive Conservative.

== Early life ==
Horne, a former debater, moved from Ontario to Alberta in 1992 to accept the position of executive director with the Alberta Debating and Speech Association. He later coached Team Canada at the World Schools Debating Championships. Prior to his election, he spent 25 years as a health policy consultant, working with various governments, health professional bodies, and research organizations to develop health care. Horne holds a master of business administration degree from Royal Roads University in Victoria, British Columbia and a postgraduate certification in dispute resolution from York University.

== Political career ==
Horne was unsuccessful in his first bid to become an MLA. In the 2004 provincial election, he lost to Liberal leader Kevin Taft by almost 7,000 votes in the constituency of Edmonton-Riverview. After the election, he became executive assistant to then Health Minister Dave Hancock, a position in which he served until the next election.

In the 2008 provincial election, Horne recaptured the Edmonton-Rutherford constituency for the Progressive Conservatives after Liberal Rick Miller overcame Tory Ian McClelland in 2004. He defeated Miller by 62 votes to win, the second-closest race of all 83 provincial constituencies.

After his election to the Alberta Legislature, Horne chaired the Standing Committee on Health, which was tasked with examining Bill 24, the Adult Guardianship and Trusteeship Act. The proposed legislation concerns personal and financial substitute decision-making for mentally incapacitated adults.

On October 12, 2011, Horne was appointed the Minister of Health and Wellness. He was shuffled out of Cabinet on September 15, 2014.

== Election results ==
2008 Alberta general election: Edmonton-Rutherford
Party	Candidate	Votes	%	±%
Progressive Conservative	Fred Horne	5,225	42.49%	10.67%
Liberal	Rick Miller	5,167	42.02%	-13.04%
New Democratic	Mike Butler	1,178	9.58%	1.99%
Wildrose Alliance	John Baloun	379	3.08%	-0.85%
Green	Katherine Wyrostok	348	2.83%	–
Total		12,297	–	–
Rejected, spoiled and declined		18	37	23
Eligible electors / turnout		26,939	45.80%	-8.83%
Progressive Conservative gain from Liberal		Swing		11.38%
Source(s) Source: "40 - Edmonton-Rutherford, 2008 Alberta general election". officialresults.elections.ab.ca. Elections Alberta. Chief Electoral Officer (2008). The Report on the March 3, 2008 Provincial General Election of the Twenty-Seventh Legislative Assembly (Report). Edmonton, Alta.: Elections Alberta. pp. 332–335.

2012 Alberta general election: Edmonton-Rutherford
Party	Candidate	Votes	%	±%
Progressive Conservative	Fred Horne	6,942	42.20%	-0.29%
Liberal	Rick Miller	3,619	22.00%	-20.02%
Wildrose Alliance	Kyle McLeod	2,765	16.81%	13.73%
Alberta Party	Michael Walters	1,672	10.16%	–
New Democratic	Melanie Samaroden	1,368	8.32%	-1.26%
Evergreen	David Tonner	85	0.52%	-2.31%
Total		16,451	–	–
Rejected, spoiled and declined		64	57	17
Eligible electors / turnout		27,115	60.97%	15.17%
Progressive Conservative hold		Swing		9.86%
Source(s) Source: "43 - Edmonton-Rutherford, 2012 Alberta general election". officialresults.elections.ab.ca. Elections Alberta. Chief Electoral Officer (2012). The Report of the Chief Electoral Officer on the 2011 Provincial Enumeration and Monday, April 23, 2012 Provincial General Election of the Twenty-eighth Legislative Assembly (PDF) (Report). Edmonton, Alta.: Elections Alberta. Archived (PDF) from the original on May 6, 2021.
