= Rakhi Pancholi =

Canadian politician (born 1977)

Rakhi Pancholi MLA
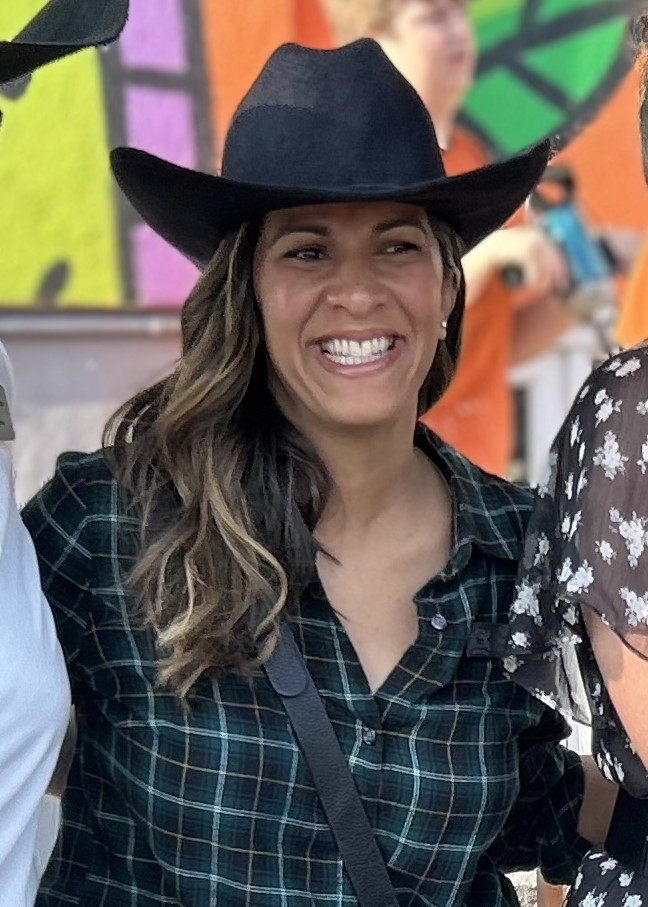
- Pancholi in July 2023

Deputy Leader of the Alberta New Democratic Party
- Incumbent
- Assumed office June 24, 2024
- Leader: Naheed Nenshi
- Preceded by: Christina Gray

Member of the Legislative Assembly of Alberta for Edmonton-Whitemud
- Incumbent
- Assumed office April 16, 2019
- Preceded by: Bob Turner

Personal details
- Born: 19 August 1977 (age 49) London, Ontario, Canada
- Party: Alberta NDP
- Education: University of Alberta; University of Toronto
- Occupation: Lawyer
- Website: https://www.voterakhi.ca/

Rakhi Pancholi (born 19 August 1977) is a Canadian politician who was elected in the 2019 Alberta general election to the Legislative Assembly of Alberta representing the electoral district of Edmonton-Whitemud. Born to Tanzanian and Indian parents, she is a lawyer in Edmonton with a focus on education law.

On 8 February 2024, Pancholi announced that she was running for Leader of the Alberta NDP. On June 24, 2024, the new leader of the New Democratic Party, Naheed Nenshi, appointed Pancholi as the Deputy Leader of the New Democratic Party.

== Education ==
Pancholi completed her undergraduate studies at the University of Alberta, majoring in history and political science. She studied law at the University of Toronto, with a focus on Constitutional Law.

== Career ==
Pancholi was a practising lawyer in Edmonton with a focus on labour/employment and education law. She has experience working with the Alberta School Boards Association and was a senior legislative consultant for Alberta Education.

Pancholi helped to establish LEAF's "No Means No" (NMN) program in 2007 which focused on youth and sexual assault issues. Between 2008 and 2013, she worked for the Alberta government in the Alberta Education Department. During that time she led the drafting the Education Act. Pancholi also worked for Alberta school boards.

In 2019, Pancholi entered politics and was elected Member of the Legislative Assembly (MLA) for Edmonton-Whitemud, and was re-elected in 2023. She was appointed Deputy Leader of the Alberta New Democratic Party in 2024 under party leader Naheed Nenshi.

== Personal life ==
Pancholi has two young children with her husband Owen. They have two rescue dogs, and they are both advocates for animal rescue and adoption.

== Electoral history ==
=== 2023 general election ===
2023 Alberta general election: Edmonton-Whitemud
Party	Candidate	Votes	%	±%
New Democratic	Rakhi Pancholi	12,797	60.40	+11.22
United Conservative	Raj Sherman	7,799	36.81	-2.63
Liberal	Donna Wilson	370	1.75	–
Green	Cheri Hawley	221	1.04	–
Total		21,187	99.29	–
Rejected and declined		152	0.71	
Turnout		21,339	64.65	
Eligible voters		33,005		
New Democratic hold		Swing		+6.92
Source(s) Source: Elections Alberta

=== 2019 general election ===
2019 Alberta general election: Edmonton-Whitemud
Party	Candidate	Votes	%	±%
New Democratic	Rakhi Pancholi	11,373	49.18%	-8.27%
United Conservative	Elisabeth Hughes	9,120	39.44%	0.86%
Alberta Party	Jonathan Dai	2,335	10.10%	–
Freedom Conservative	Jason Norris	297	1.28%	–
Total		23,125	–	–
Rejected, spoiled and declined		63	76	18
Eligible electors / turnout		32,810	70.73%	10.33%
New Democratic hold		Swing		-7.75%
Source(s) Source: "46 - Edmonton-Whitemud, 2019 Alberta general election". officialresults.elections.ab.ca. Elections Alberta. Alberta. Chief Electoral Officer (2019). 2019 General Election. A Report of the Chief Electoral Officer. Volume II (PDF) (Report). Vol. 2. Edmonton, Alta.: Elections Alberta. pp. 180–183. ISBN 978-1-988620-12-1.
