= Edmonton-Rutherford =

Provincial electoral district in Alberta, Canada

Coordinates: 53.46°N 113.50°W

Alberta electoral district
- Edmonton-Rutherford within the City of Edmonton, 2017 boundaries

Provincial electoral district
- Legislature: Legislative Assembly of Alberta
MLA
Jodi Calahoo Stonehouse
New Democratic
- District created: 1993
- First contested: 1993
- Last contested: 2023

Edmonton-Rutherford is a provincial electoral district in Alberta, Canada. The district is mandated to return a single member to the Legislative Assembly of Alberta using the first past the post method of voting.

The district was created in the boundary redistribution of 1993 from the Edmonton-Whitemud riding in South Edmonton. The district is a swing riding and has regularly changed between Liberal and Progressive Conservative control. It was named after former Premier Alexander Rutherford who represented the Strathcona constituency after the province was formed in 1905. the old Strathcona district included what is now Edmonton Rutherford.

== History ==
The electoral district was created in the 1993 boundary redistribution out of Edmonton-Whitemud. It saw minor changes in the 2010 redistribution. The district gained some land that was part of Edmonton-Whitemud on its western boundary when the boundary was moved west from 119 Street to Whitemud Creek.

=== Boundary history ===
40 Edmonton-Rutherford 2003 boundaries
Bordering districts
North	East	West	South
Edmonton-Riverview, Edmonton-Strathcona and Edmonton-Mill Creek	Edmonton-Ellerslie and Edmonton-Mill Woods	Edmonton-Whitemud	Edmonton-Whitemud
riding map goes here			
Legal description from the Statutes of Alberta 2003, Electoral Divisions Act.
Starting at the intersection of 122 Street with Whitemud Drive; then 1. east along Whitemud Drive to Gateway Boulevard; 2. south along Gateway Boulevard to the north boundary of Sec. 28, Twp. 51, Rge. 24 W4; 3. west along the north boundary of Secs. 28 and 29, Twp. 51, Rge. 24 W4 to Blackmud Creek; 4. in a northwesterly direction along Blackmud Creek to the power line right of way as shown in Plan 1225 KS; 5. east along the power line right of way to 119 Street; 6. north along 119/122 Street to the starting point.
Note:

43 Edmonton-Rutherford 2010 boundaries
Bordering districts
North	East	West	South
Edmonton-Riverview and Edmonton-Strathcona	Edmonton-Ellerslie, Edmonton-Mill Creek and Edmonton-Mill Woods	Edmonton-Whitemud	Edmonton-South West
Legal description from the Statutes of Alberta 2010, Electoral Divisions Act.

=== Electoral history ===
Members of the Legislative Assembly for Edmonton-Rutherford
Assembly	Years	Member	Party
Riding created from Edmonton-Whitemud and Edmonton-Parkallen
23rd	1993-1997	Percy Wickman	Liberal
24th	1997-2001	Percy Wickman	Liberal
25th	2001-2004	Ian McClelland	PC
26th	2004-2008	Rick Miller	Liberal
27th	2008–2012	Fred Horne	PC
28th	2012-2015	Fred Horne	PC
29th	2015–2019	Richard Feehan	NDP
30th	2019–2023	Richard Feehan	NDP
31st	2023–present	Jodi Calahoo Stonehouse	NDP

The electoral district was created in the boundary redistribution in 1993 from Edmonton-Whitemud riding. The first election in 1993 saw Edmonton-Whitemud incumbent Percy Wickman pickup the new district for the Liberal party with a very large majority. Wickman was re-elected in a tight race in the 1997 general election. He retired at the end of his third term in 2001 due to health issues.

The 2001 general election saw former Member of Parliament Ian McClelland pickup the district for the first time for the Progressive Conservatives. He defeated Liberal candidate Rick Miller in a hotly contested race.

McClelland and Miller would face each other for the second time in the 2004 general election. This time Miller would gain significant share of the popular vote to defeat McClelland.

Miller would only last a single term in office, he ran for re-election in 2008 but was defeated in a very close race by Progressive Conservative candidate Fred Horne.

== Legislative election results ==
=== 1993 ===
1993 Alberta general election
Party	Candidate	Votes	%	±%
Liberal	Percy Wickman	8,583	59.76%	–
Progressive Conservative	Brenda Platzer	4,283	29.82%	–
New Democratic	Olive Dickason	969	6.75%	–
Social Credit	David Wozney	398	2.77%	–
Natural Law	Wade McKinley	66	0.46%	–
Greens	Myles Evely	64	0.45%	–
Total		14,363	–	–
Rejected, spoiled and declined		25	–	–
Eligible electors / Turnout		23,309	61.73%	–
Liberal pickup new district.				
Source(s) Source: "Edmonton-Rutherford Official Results 1993 Alberta general election". Alberta Heritage Community Foundation.

=== 1997 ===
1997 Alberta general election
Party	Candidate	Votes	%	±%
Liberal	Percy Wickman	6,007	46.44%	-13.31%
Progressive Conservative	Brenda Platzer	5,078	39.26%	9.44%
New Democratic	Will Hodgson	1,156	8.94%	2.19%
Social Credit	David Lincoln	674	5.21%	2.44%
Independent	Ian Zaharko	19	0.15%	–
Total		12,934	–	–
Rejected, spoiled and declined		22	18	4
Eligible electors / Turnout		22,002	58.90%	-2.82%
Liberal hold		Swing		-11.38%
Source(s) Source: "Edmonton-Rutherford Official Results 1997 Alberta general election". Alberta Heritage Community Foundation. Alberta. Chief Electoral Officer (1997). Report of the Chief Electoral Officer, November, 1996 general enumeration and Tuesday, March 11, 1997 general election Twenty-fourth Legislative Assembly. Edmonton: Alberta Legislative Assembly, Office of the Chief Electoral Officer.

=== 2001 ===
2001 Alberta general election
Party	Candidate	Votes	%	±%
Progressive Conservative	Ian McClelland	6,173	48.22%	8.96%
Liberal	Rick Miller	5,558	43.42%	-3.03%
New Democratic	Shane MacDonald	1,071	8.37%	-0.57%
Total		12,802	–	–
Rejected, spoiled and declined		33	24	3
Eligible electors / Turnout		22,762	56.40%	-2.50%
Progressive Conservative gain from Liberal		Swing		-1.19%
Source(s) Source: "Edmonton-Rutherford Official Results 2001 Alberta general election". Alberta Heritage Community Foundation. Alberta. Chief Electoral Officer (2001). The report of the Chief Electoral Officer on the 2000 provincial confirmation process and Monday, March 12, 2001, Provincial General Election of the twenty-fifth Legislative Assembly. Edmonton: Alberta Legislative Assembly, Office of the Chief Electoral Officer.

=== 2004 ===
2004 Alberta general election
Party	Candidate	Votes	%	±%
Liberal	Rick Miller	7,221	55.06%	11.64%
Progressive Conservative	Ian McClelland	4,173	31.82%	−16.40%
New Democratic	George A. Slade	995	7.59%	−0.78%
Alberta Alliance	R. J. (Bob) Ewart	516	3.93%	–
Social Credit	Anita Ashmore	210	1.60%	–
Total		13,115	–	–
Rejected, spoiled and declined		49	31	0
Eligible electors / turnout		24,096	54.63%	-1.77%
Liberal gain from Progressive Conservative		Swing		9.22%
Source(s) Source: "00 - Edmonton-Rutherford, 2004 Alberta general election". officialresults.elections.ab.ca. Elections Alberta. Alberta. Chief Electoral Officer (2005). Report of the Chief Electoral Officer on the General Enumeration and General Election of the Twenty-sixth Legislative Assembly (Report). Edmonton: Alberta Legislative Assembly, Office of the Chief Electoral Officer.

=== 2008 ===
2008 Alberta general election
Party	Candidate	Votes	%	±%
Progressive Conservative	Fred Horne	5,225	42.49%	10.67%
Liberal	Rick Miller	5,167	42.02%	-13.04%
New Democratic	Mike Butler	1,178	9.58%	1.99%
Wildrose Alliance	John Baloun	379	3.08%	-0.85%
Green	Katherine Wyrostok	348	2.83%	–
Total		12,297	–	–
Rejected, spoiled and declined		18	37	23
Eligible electors / turnout		26,939	45.80%	-8.83%
Progressive Conservative gain from Liberal		Swing		11.38%
Source(s) Source: "40 - Edmonton-Rutherford, 2008 Alberta general election". officialresults.elections.ab.ca. Elections Alberta. Chief Electoral Officer (2008). The Report on the March 3, 2008 Provincial General Election of the Twenty-Seventh Legislative Assembly (Report). Edmonton, Alta.: Elections Alberta. pp. 332–335.

=== 2012 ===
2012 Alberta general election
Party	Candidate	Votes	%	±%
Progressive Conservative	Fred Horne	6,942	42.20%	-0.29%
Liberal	Rick Miller	3,619	22.00%	-20.02%
Wildrose Alliance	Kyle McLeod	2,765	16.81%	13.73%
Alberta Party	Michael Walters	1,672	10.16%	–
New Democratic	Melanie Samaroden	1,368	8.32%	-1.26%
Evergreen	David Tonner	85	0.52%	-2.31%
Total		16,451	–	–
Rejected, spoiled and declined		64	57	17
Eligible electors / turnout		27,115	60.97%	15.17%
Progressive Conservative hold		Swing		9.86%
Source(s) Source: "43 - Edmonton-Rutherford, 2012 Alberta general election". officialresults.elections.ab.ca. Elections Alberta. Chief Electoral Officer (2012). The Report of the Chief Electoral Officer on the 2011 Provincial Enumeration and Monday, April 23, 2012 Provincial General Election of the Twenty-eighth Legislative Assembly (PDF) (Report). Edmonton, Alta.: Elections Alberta. Archived (PDF) from the original on May 6, 2021.

=== 2015 ===
2015 Alberta general election
Party	Candidate	Votes	%	±%
New Democratic	Richard Feehan	11,214	63.94%	55.62%
Progressive Conservative	Chris Labossiere	3,940	22.46%	-19.73%
Wildrose	Josef Pisa	1,644	9.37%	-7.44%
Liberal	Michael Chan	741	4.22%	-17.77%
Total		17,539	–	–
Rejected, spoiled and declined		23	37	41
Eligible electors / turnout		29,253	60.18%	-0.79%
New Democratic gain from Progressive Conservative		Swing		10.64%
Source(s) Source: "43 - Edmonton-Rutherford, 2015 Alberta general election". officialresults.elections.ab.ca. Elections Alberta. Chief Electoral Officer (2016). 2015 General Election. A Report of the Chief Electoral Officer (PDF) (Report). Edmonton, Alta.: Elections Alberta.

2015 Alberta general election redistributed results
Party	Votes	%
New Democratic	12,896	62.33
Progressive Conservative	4,950	23.76
Wildrose	1,938	9.30
Liberal	920	4.42
Alberta Party	39	0.19
Source(s) Source: Ridingbuilder

=== 2019 ===
2019 Alberta general election
Party	Candidate	Votes	%	±%
New Democratic	Richard Feehan	12,154	54.81	-7.52
United Conservative	Hannah Presakarchuk	7,737	34.89	+1.83
Alberta Party	Aisha Rauf	1,600	7.22	+7.03
Liberal	Claire Wilde	375	1.69	-2.72
Green	Valerie Kennedy	191	0.86	–
Alberta Independence	Lionel Levoir	117	0.53	–
Total		22,174	99.50	–
Rejected, spoiled and declined		111	0.50	
Turnout		22,285	69.47	
Eligible electors		32,077		
New Democratic hold		Swing		-4.68
Source(s) Source: "41 - Edmonton-Rutherford, 2019 Alberta general election". officialresults.elections.ab.ca. Elections Alberta. Alberta. Chief Electoral Officer (2019). 2019 General Election. A Report of the Chief Electoral Officer. Volume II (PDF) (Report). Vol. 2. Edmonton, Alta.: Elections Alberta. pp. 160–163. ISBN 978-1-988620-12-1.

=== 2023 ===
2023 Alberta general election
Party	Candidate	Votes	%	±%
New Democratic	Jodi Calahoo Stonehouse	13,012	65.05	+10.24
United Conservative	Laine Larson	6,366	31.83	-3.07
Green	Jordan Wilkie	624	3.12	+2.26
Total		20,002	99.26	–
Rejected and declined		150	0.74	
Turnout		20,152	63.52	
Eligible voters		31,726		
New Democratic hold		Swing		+6.65
Source(s) Source: Elections Alberta

== Graphical representation ==
1993
6.8%	59.8%	29.8%	2.8%
NDP	Liberal	Progressive Conservative	SC

1997
8.9%	46.4%	39.2%	5.2%
NDP	Liberal	Progressive Conservative	SC

2001
8.4%	43.4%	48.2%
NDP	Liberal	Progressive Conservative

2004
7.6%	55.1%	31.8%	3.9%
NDP	Liberal	Progressive Conservative	AA

2008
2.8%	9.6%	42.0%	42.5%	3.1%
G	NDP	Liberal	Progressive Conservative	WA

2012
8.3%	21.9%	10.2%	42.1%	16.9%
NDP	Liberal	Alberta	Progressive Conservative	Wildrose

2015
63.9%	4.2%	22.5%	9.4%
New Democrat	Liberal	Progressive Conservative	Wildrose

2019
54.8%		7.2%	34.9%
New Democrat	L	Alberta	United Conservative

2023
3.1%	65.1%	31.8%
Green	New Democrat	United Conservative

== Senate nominee election results ==
=== 2004 ===
2004 Senate nominee election results: Edmonton-Rutherford				Turnout 63.24%	
Affiliation	Candidate	Votes	% votes	% ballots	Rank
Progressive Conservative	Betty Unger	4,171	15.68%	46.40%	2
Independent	Link Byfield	3,706	13.94%	41.22%	4
Progressive Conservative	Bert Brown	3,116	11.72%	34.66%	1
Progressive Conservative	Cliff Breitkreuz	2,984	11.22%	33.19%	3
Independent	Tom Sindlinger	2,554	9.60%	28.41%	9
Alberta Alliance	Michael Roth	2,364	8.89%	26.30%	7
Progressive Conservative	David Usherwood	1,987	7.47%	22.10%	6
Alberta Alliance	Gary Horan	1,976	7.43%	21.98%	10
Alberta Alliance	Vance Gough	1,955	7.35%	21.75%	8
Progressive Conservative	Jim Silye	1,782	6.70%	19.82%	5
Total votes		26,595	100%		
Total ballots		8,990	2.96 votes per ballot		
Rejected, spoiled and declined		3,990			

Voters had the option of selecting four candidates on the ballot

== Student vote results ==
=== 2004 ===
Participating schools
Louis St Laurent School
St. Augustine School

On November 19, 2004 a student vote was conducted at participating Alberta schools to parallel the 2004 Alberta general election results. The vote was designed to educate students and simulate the electoral process for persons who have not yet reached the legal majority. The vote was conducted in 80 of the 83 provincial electoral districts with students voting for actual election candidates. Schools with a large student body that reside in another electoral district had the option to vote for candidates outside of the electoral district then where they were physically located.

2004 Alberta student vote results
Affiliation	Candidate	Votes	%
Liberal	Rick Miller	199	34.91%
Progressive Conservative	Ian McClelland	159	27.89%
NDP	George Slade	136	23.86%
Alberta Alliance	Robert Ewart	64	11.23%
Social Credit	Anita Ashmore	12	2.11%
Total		570	100%
Rejected, spoiled and declined		0	

=== 2012 ===
2012 Alberta student vote results
Affiliation	Candidate	Votes
Progressive Conservative	Fred Horne	6,853
Liberal	Rick Miller	3,562
Wildrose	Kyle McLeod	2,742
Alberta Party	Michael Walters	1,662
New Democratic	Melanie Samaroden	1,357
Evergreen	David Tonner	86

== See also ==
- List of Alberta provincial electoral districts
- Canadian provincial electoral districts
