= Bob Turner (Canadian politician) =

Canadian politician

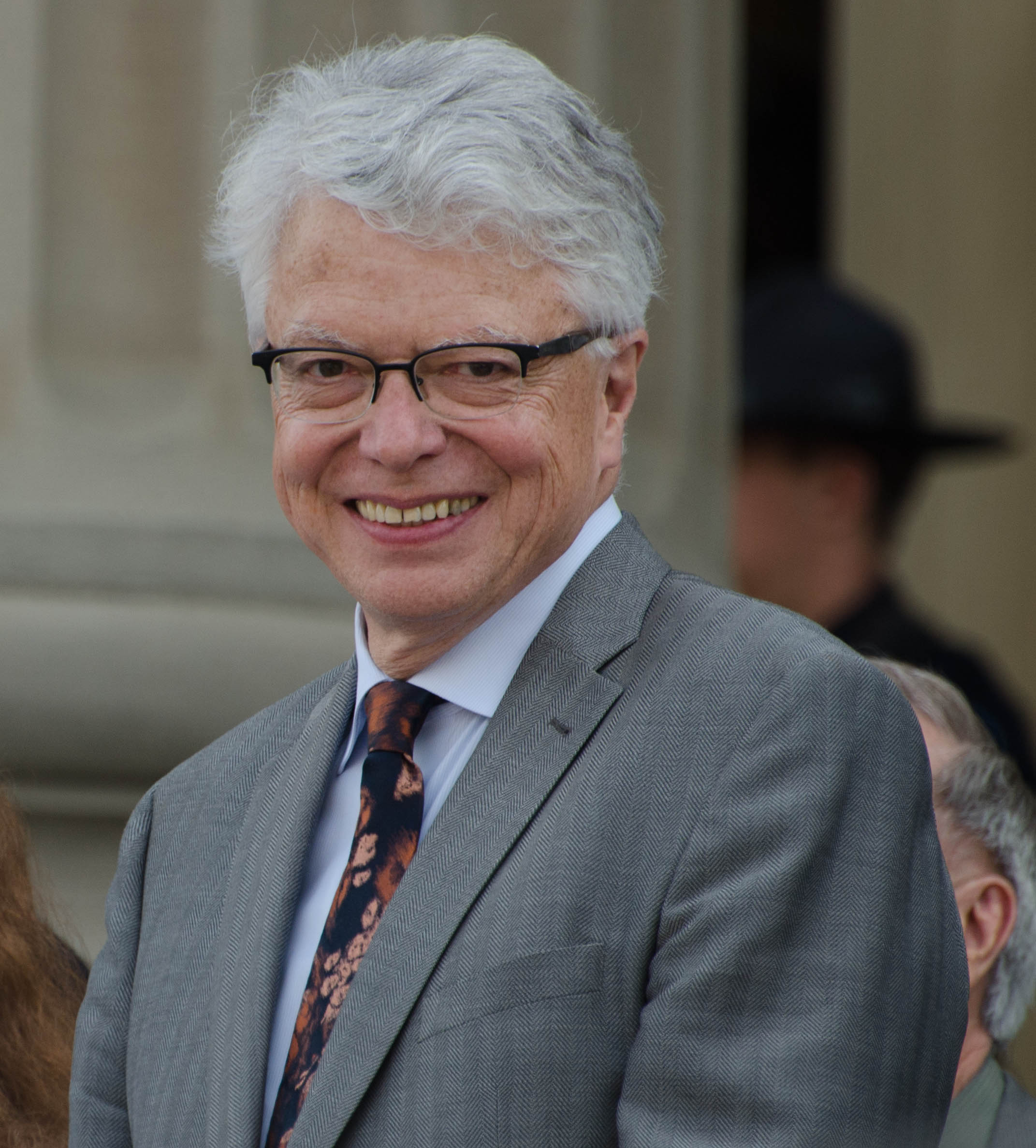
- Turner in May 2015

Member of the Legislative Assembly of Alberta for Edmonton-Whitemud
- In office May 5, 2015 – March 19, 2019
- Preceded by: Stephen Mandel
- Succeeded by: Rakhi Pancholi

Personal details
- Born: Andrew Robert Turner; June 23, 1948 Brandon, Manitoba, Canada
- Died: November 2026 (aged 78)
- Party: Alberta New Democratic Party
- Occupation: Medical doctor, professor

Andrew Robert Turner (June 23, 1948 – November 2026) was a Canadian politician who was elected in the 2015 Alberta general election to the Legislative Assembly of Alberta representing the electoral district of Edmonton-Whitemud as a member of the Alberta New Democratic Party. He won his seat with 12,803 votes, defeating incumbent health minister and former mayor of Edmonton, Stephen Mandel by 5,622 votes, or around 57% of the vote to Mandel's 32%. Mandel had previously beaten Turner in an October 2014 by-election after Mandel was appointed as an unelected minister by then-Premier Jim Prentice.

== Medical career ==
Turner was a hematologist/oncologist at the University of Alberta Hospital and Cross Cancer Institute and was a professor of medicine and oncology at the University of Alberta in Edmonton, Alberta, Canada. He also served Stanton Medical Clinic in Yellowknife, Northwest Territories. He was a graduate of McGill University medical school and had training in Internal Medicine from Royal Victoria Hospital in Montreal, Quebec and Hematology and Medical Oncology from the University of Pittsburgh. He practiced hematology and oncology medicine, with a special interest in blood disorders such as acute and chronic leukemias, lymphomas, myelodysplastic syndromes, myeloproliferative neoplasms, mast cell diseases and stem cell transplantation. In the past, Turner was the medical director of the Canadian Red Cross Blood Transfusion Service Center in Edmonton and director of the Division of Clinical Hematology of the University of Alberta. In 2007 he was selected as the Physician of the Year by the Edmonton Zone Medical Staff Association.

== Political career ==
Turner served as a member of the Standing Committee on Public Accounts and as a member on the Standing Committee on the Alberta Heritage Savings Trust Fund. Previously he served as chair of the Standing Committee on Privileges and Elections, Standing Orders and Printing.

Turner has been a supporter of issues such as LGBTQ2S+ rights, he replaced a rainbow flag that was cut down from Lillian Osborne High School in June 2017.

Turner chose not to run for re-election in the 2019 election, stating "From the beginning, I spoke about the need to move forward in building Nellie Carlson School, with upgrading the Misericordia Hospital and eliminating flavoured tobacco...I've been proud to see all of these goals accomplished".

In his place, the NDP ran Rakhi Pancholi as its candidate. She won the seat, defeating Elisabeth Hughes of the United Conservative Party. Turner's death at the age of 78 was announced on November 21, 2026.

== Electoral history ==
=== 2014 by-election ===
Alberta provincial by-election, October 27, 2014: Edmonton-Whitemud Resignation of Dave Hancock on September 25, 2014
Party	Candidate	Votes	%	±%
Progressive Conservative	Stephen Mandel	6,003	42.39	-17.85
New Democratic	Bob Turner	3,150	22.24	13.24
Wildrose	Tim Grover	2,680	18.92	2.72
Liberal	Donna Wilson	2,033	14.35	2.39
Alberta Party	Will Munsey	202	1.43	-0.92
Green	René Malenfant	95	0.67	—
Total		14,163	—	—
Rejected, spoiled and declined		14	11	17
Eligible electors / turnout		35,795	39.36	-19.67
Progressive Conservative hold		Swing		-15.54
Source(s) Alberta. Chief Electoral Officer (2015). Report on the October 27, 2014 By-elections in: Calgary-Elbow, Calgary-Foothills, Calgary-West, Edmonton-Whitemud (PDF) (Report). Edmonton: Legislative Assembly of Alberta; Chief Electoral Officer. ISBN 978-098653678-6.

=== 2015 general election ===
2015 Alberta general election: Edmonton-Whitemud
Party	Candidate	Votes	%	±%
New Democratic	Bob Turner	12,805	57.45%	35.21%
Progressive Conservative	Stephen Mandel	7,177	32.20%	-10.19%
Wildrose	Chad Peters	1,423	6.38%	-12.94%
Liberal	Steven Townsend	629	2.82%	-11.53%
Green	Kathryn Jackson	182	0.82%	0.15%
Independent	John Baloun	73	0.33%	–
Total		22,289	–	–
Rejected, spoiled and declined		57	45	11
Eligible electors / turnout		37,018	60.39%	21.03%
New Democratic gain from Progressive Conservative		Swing		22.70%
Source(s) Source: "46 - Edmonton-Whitemud, 2015 Alberta general election". officialresults.elections.ab.ca. Elections Alberta. Chief Electoral Officer (2016). 2015 General Election. A Report of the Chief Electoral Officer (PDF) (Report). Edmonton, Alta.: Elections Alberta. pp. 254–258.
