= Percy Wickman =

Canadian politician and activist (1941–2004)

Percy Wickman CM

Member of the Legislative Assembly of Alberta
- In office 1993–2001
- Succeeded by: Ian McClelland
- Constituency: Edmonton-Rutherford
- In office 1989–1993
- Preceded by: Don Getty
- Succeeded by: Mike Percy
- Constituency: Edmonton-Whitemud

Personal details
- Born: Percy Dwight Wickman; June 10, 1941 Thunder Bay, Ontario, Canada
- Died: July 3, 2004 (aged 63) Edmonton, Alberta
- Party: Alberta Liberal Party
- Spouse: Silvia
- Profession: activist, city councillor

Percy Dwight Wickman (June 10, 1941 – July 3, 2004) was a Canadian politician and well-known activist for people with disabilities. Wickman served on the Edmonton City Council from 1977 to 1986 and as Liberal MLA from 1989 to 2001.

He was born in Thunder Bay, Ontario.

Wickman served as an alderman on Edmonton City Council from 1977 to 1986. He made headlines when he was elected as Liberal MLA for Edmonton-Whitemud after unseating Alberta premier Don Getty in the 1989 election, despite the fact Getty had otherwise won a majority government. In 1993 election and 1997 election Wickman was re-elected as the MLA for Edmonton Rutherford. Wickman retired from politics in 2001.

Wickman died in 2004 due to a paraplegic-related infection at the age of 63, less than a month after being invested as a Member of the Order of Canada.
