= Doug Main =

Canadian politician (born 1946)

The Honourable Doug Main ECA

Leader of the Principled Accountable Coalition for Edmonton
- Incumbent
- Assumed office January 27, 2025

Member of the Legislative Assembly of Alberta
- In office 1989–1993
- Preceded by: Neil Stanley Crawford
- Constituency: Edmonton-Parkallen

Personal details
- Born: July 18, 1946 (age 80) Willow Bunch, Saskatchewan
- Party: Progressive Conservative Association of Alberta
- Occupation: broadcaster

Douglas Cameron Main ECA (born July 18, 1946) is a Canadian broadcaster, communications consultant, political commentator and former Member of the Legislative Assembly of Alberta. He served as Cabinet Minister. He served as the news anchor for CITV (now Global Edmonton) from 1975 to 1988.

== Broadcasting career ==
Main was a news anchor for CITV (now Global Edmonton) from 1975 to 1988. He left broadcasting to pursue a political career.

== Political career ==
Main first ran as the Reform Party of Canada's candidate in Edmonton—Strathcona in the 1988 federal general election. He finished the race a very close third place in a field of ten candidates, losing to Progressive Conservative candidate Scott Thorkelson.

After being defeated in the federal election, Main was approached by the provincial Progressive Conservatives to run in the next Alberta election. He was elected in the constituency of Edmonton-Parkallen in the 1989 Alberta general election.

On April 14, 1989, Main was sworn in as Minister of Culture and Multiculturalism in the Cabinet of Premier Don Getty. He only served a single term in office, leaving at dissolution of the Assembly at the 1993 provincial general election after losing his nomination to run for the Progressive Conservatives again.

In 1992, Main ran for the leadership of the Progressive Conservatives, coming 4th with 9.59% of the vote on the first ballot.

In 2024, Main helped form the municipal political party Principled Accountable Coalition for Edmonton (PACE). In January 2025, the party was officially registered. Although the party did not run a mayoral candidate in the 2025 Edmonton municipal election and Main did not run for council, he is considered to be the leader of the party.

Legislative Assembly of Alberta
Preceded by Neil Stanley Crawford	MLA Edmonton-Parkallen; 1989–1993	Succeeded by District Abolished
