= Rick Miller (Canadian politician) =

Canadian politician

MLA for Edmonton-Rutherford
- In office 2004–2008
- Preceded by: Ian McClelland
- Succeeded by: Fred Horne

Personal details
- Born: July 23, 1960 Burns Lake, British Columbia, Canada
- Died: October 24, 2013 (aged 53) Edmonton, Alberta, Canada
- Party: Liberal

Richard Arthur Miller (July 23, 1960 – October 26, 2013) was a politician in the Canadian province of Alberta and former member of the Legislative Assembly of Alberta.

He was elected on November 22, 2004, in the 26th Alberta general election in Edmonton Rutherford, defeating incumbent Progressive Conservative and former member of the House of Commons of Canada Ian McClelland. Miller served as opposition critic for two portfolios, the Treasury Board and Finance. He was also the chief opposition whip for the Alberta Liberal Party. He was defeated in the 2008 election by Progressive Conservative Fred Horne.

In May 2005, Miller involved himself in the controversy surrounding the decision of then Conservative Belinda Stronach to cross the floor to the Liberals. After Tony Abbott, a fellow Member of the Legislative Assembly of Alberta, made remarks comparing Stronach to a prostitute, Miller spoke out on the floor of the Legislative Assembly, condemning Abbott's remarks. After his speech, Abbott reportedly attempted to assault Miller in the corridor behind the Chamber. Due to a security guard's intervention, a major confrontation was prevented. This matter was resolved when Abbott apologized publicly for any perceived wrongs. Though Edmonton-Rutherford was perceived as an Alberta Liberal stronghold since the 1989 provincial election (in which Liberal MLA Percy Wickman defeated Premier Don Getty in his own riding), Rick Miller lost by 58 votes to PC candidate Fred Horne in 2008 and widened in the 2012 election.

For the years from shortly after the 2008 election until a few months after the election of Raj Sherman as leader of the Liberals in 2012, Mr. Miller served as Chief of Staff for the Alberta Liberal Caucus.

On October 26, 2013, Miller died of prostate cancer in Edmonton, he was survived by his wife and two children.

An avid flyer of unpowered glider planes, he could often be found at an airfield near Edmonton when he was not working for his family stamp business, involved in politics or attending his regular Rotary club meetings.
