= MacKinnon Report =

Blue Ribbon Panel on Alberta’s Finances
- Also known as: MacKinnon Report
- Outcome: Report and recommendations : Blue Ribbon Panel on Alberta’s Finances
- Chair: Janice MacKinnon (Chair); Mike Percy; Kim Henderson; Bev Dahlby; Dave Mowat; Jay Ramotar
- Inquiry period: 7 May 2019 – 15 August 2019
- Authorized: Ministerial Order No. 13/2019

The MacKinnon Report, officially titled Report and recommendations: Blue Ribbon Panel on Alberta’s Finances, is the official report documenting the findings and conclusions of Blue-Ribbon Panel on Alberta's Finances into the economy of Alberta and the province's finances. The Panel was chaired by former Saskatchewan finance minister Janice MacKinnon, and was submitted to the Minister of Finance Travis Toews on August 15, 2019, and subsequently released to the public on September 3, 2019.

The report was commissioned by Alberta Premier Jason Kenney shortly following his United Conservative Party (UCP) was elected in the April 16, 2019 Alberta general election. As part of his campaign, Kenney promised to balance the province's budget by the fiscal year 2022–23.

The MacKinnon Report's findings concluded that to achieve a balanced budget by 2022–23, the provincial budget should have "no increases in government spending for four years and a reduction in operating costs by at least $600 million, as well as cuts in capital spending." The report sets out 26 recommendations which include "sweeping reviews of health care and education".

== Background ==
=== Scope and mandate ===
The Blue Ribbon Panel on Alberta’s Finances was created on May 7, 2019 by Ministerial Order issued by Finance Minister Travis Toews. The terms of reference for the panel included evaluating the province's fiscal outlook and expenses; develop a plan to balance the budget by 2022-23 without raising taxes; develop a fiscal framework that requires future balanced budgets and a plan to retire the province’s accumulated debt; evaluation of the province's budgeting, fiscal planning and public reporting processes and systems; and evaluate overall economic situation in Canada and its impact on the province. The terms of reference for the panel did not authorize the evaluation of government revenues, including mechanisms to increase revenue.

The panel included chair Janice MacKinnon, former Finance Minister for Saskatchewan from 1993–1997; Mike Percy, a former Member of the Legislative Assembly of Alberta from 1993–1997, and dean of the Alberta School of Business at the University of Alberta; Kim Henderson, the former deputy minister in British Columbia; Bev Dahlby, a Fellow at the School of Public Policy at the University of Calgary; Dave Mowat, former president and Chief Executive Officer at ATB Financial; and Jay Ramotar, a former deputy minister in Alberta.

== Findings ==
The MacKinnon Report provided 26 recommendations to the Government of Alberta to address the delivery of services and the province's economic competitiveness.

=== Health ===
Per capita Health Care Expenditure in Alberta compared to the National Average, in 1997 constant dollars, 1975 to 2019 View source data.

In general, the MacKinnon report recommended policies to lower Alberta's per capita spending to be more comparable to other provinces, mostly in healthcare. As the report noted "Alberta’s annual expenditures would be $10.4 billion less if its per capita spending simply matched the average of spending in Canada’s three largest provinces: British Columbia, Ontario and Quebec – and we would not have a deficit."

The MacKinnon Report provided four recommendations for the Government of Alberta's approach to health and healthcare.

=== Education ===
The MacKinnon Report provided two recommendations for the Government of Alberta's approach to primary and secondary education.

=== Advanced education ===
The MacKinnon Report provided three recommendations for the Government of Alberta's approach to post-secondary education.

=== Public sector compensation ===
The MacKinnon Report provided three recommendations for the Government of Alberta's approach to public sector compensation and size.

=== Capital spending ===
The MacKinnon Report provided six recommendations for the Government of Alberta's approach to capital spending.

=== Program review ===
The MacKinnon Report provided one recommendation for the Government of Alberta's approach to program review.

=== Economic competitiveness ===
The MacKinnon Report provided one recommendation for the Government of Alberta's approach to provincial economic competitiveness.

=== Balanced budget ===
The MacKinnon Report provided six recommendations for the Government of Alberta's approach to delivering a balanced budget.

== Aftermath ==
The MacKinnon report said that "implementing or raising taxes isn’t the solution"—the problem with Alberta's finances is that the provincial "government is overspending". A report by University of Calgary's School of Public Policy's economics professor, Ken McKenzie, entitled Altering the Tax Min in Alberta, said that a 5% provincial sales tax (PST) —which would still be the lowest sales tax in Canada—"could generate $5 billion in revenue" for Alberta.

McKenzie's report, which was released on September 5, also recommends keeping corporate tax cuts and the "progressive tax rate instead of going back to the flat rate".

== Criticism ==
A September 4 article compared the report to the rhetoric and political arguments used by Ralph Klein, who was premier of Alberta from 1992 to 2006, and who eliminated the deficit by implementing "massive cuts to government spending and services" at the "expense of hospitals, roads, light rail transit lines, and investing in better health-care services or education". Political analyst David Taras of Mount Royal University, who admired Klein's "fiscal achievements early in his career", in a 2013 article, questioned Klein's elimination of the provincial deficit in the "midst of a booming economy in 2004" when interest charges were relatively low.

In January 2020, CTV News reported the Premier's Office directed the blue ribbon panel chair MacKinnon to issue an op-ed titled "If we make measured choices now, we can avoid draconian cuts later" drafted by staff in the Premier's Office to be published in the Calgary Herald and Edmonton Journal in May 2019. Lori Williams, a political science professor at Mount Royal University and Jared Wesley, a political science professor at the University of Alberta raised questions on the independence of the panel's investigation and findings, stating the assistance and correspondence between MacKinnon and the Premier's Office undermined the independence of the panel.
