= Peter Knaak =

Canadian politician

Member of the Legislative Assembly of Alberta
- In office 1979–1982
- Preceded by: Don Getty
- Succeeded by: Robert Alexander
- Constituency: Edmonton-Whitemud

Personal details
- Born: October 28, 1942 (age 83) Hamburg, Germany
- Party: Progressive Conservative

Peter Knaak (born October 28, 1942) was a provincial level politician from Alberta, Canada. He served as a member of the Legislative Assembly of Alberta from 1979 to 1982.

== Political career ==
Knaak ran for a seat to the Alberta Legislature in the 1979 Alberta general election. He won the electoral district of Edmonton-Whitemud with a landslide to hold it for the Progressive Conservatives. Knaak retired from provincial politics after serving a single term in office at dissolution of the legislature in 1982.
