= Robert Keith Alexander =

Canadian politician

Member of the Legislative Assembly of Alberta
- In office 1982 – November 5, 1985
- Preceded by: Peter Knaak
- Succeeded by: Don Getty
- Constituency: Edmonton-Whitemud

Personal details
- Born: July 23, 1930 Vulcan, Alberta, Canada
- Died: November 12, 2014 (aged 84) Calgary, Alberta, Canada
- Party: Progressive Conservative
- Spouse: Denise Vanessa Varenne

Robert Keith Alexander (July 23, 1930 – November 12, 2014) was a provincial level politician from Alberta, Canada. He served as a member of the Legislative Assembly of Alberta from 1982 to 1985.

== Political career ==
Alexander ran for a seat in the Alberta Legislature in the 1982 Alberta general election. He won the electoral district of Edmonton-Whitemud with a landslide victory to hold it for the governing Progressive Conservative party. He resigned his seat on November 5, 1985, so that Premier Don Getty could run in a by-election to have a seat in the legislature. He died on November 12, 2014, one day after the death of his wife, Vanessa.
