= Edmonton-Whitemud =

Provincial electoral district in Alberta, Canada

Coordinates: 53.474°N 113.541°W

Alberta electoral district
- Edmonton-Whitemud within the City of Edmonton, 2017 boundaries

Provincial electoral district
- Legislature: Legislative Assembly of Alberta
MLA
Rakhi Pancholi
New Democratic
- District created: 1971
- First contested: 1971
- Last contested: 2023

Edmonton-Whitemud is a provincial electoral district for the Legislative Assembly of Alberta, Canada. In 1989, its constituents unseated the Premier of the day, Donald Getty, by voting for Liberal candidate Percy Wickman.

The district was represented by Dave Hancock who was in his fourth term as the Member of the Legislative Assembly. Hancock has also served as Minister of Justice twice, Attorney General and prior to that as Minister of Intergovernmental and Aboriginal Affairs.

On December 15, 2006, Hancock was made Minister of Health and Wellness in Premier Ed Stelmach's cabinet. He later served as Deputy Premier under Stelmach's successor Alison Redford. Following Redford's resignation as Premier, Hancock was named as her replacement and sworn into office on March 23, 2014, meaning the Edmonton-Whitemud district was the seat of the Premier of Alberta for the second time.

Since 2015, the riding has been represented by a succession of NDP MLAs, currently Rakhi Pancholi.

== History ==
The electoral district was created in the 1971 boundary redistribution from the electoral districts of Strathcona Centre and Strathcona West.

The 2010 boundary redistribution saw the riding significantly altered. It lost all land south of Anthony Henday Drive to the new electoral district of Edmonton-South West. It also lost land along the east boundary with Edmonton-Rutherford. The old line established in 2003 ran along 119 Street. It was pushed west to run continuously along Whitemud Creek.

=== Boundary history ===
42 Edmonton-Whitemud 2003 boundaries
Bordering districts
North	East	West	South
Edmonton-Riverview	Edmonton-Ellerslie and Edmonton-Rutherford	Edmonton-McClung and Stony Plain	Leduc-Beaumont-Devon
riding map goes here			
Legal description from the Statutes of Alberta 2003, Electoral Divisions Act.
Starting at the intersection of the left bank of the North Saskatchewan River with Whitemud Drive; then 1. south along Whitemud Drive to Fox Drive; 2. east along Fox Drive to Whitemud Creek; 3. south along Whitemud Creek to Whitemud Drive; 4. east along Whitemud Drive to 122 Street; 5. south along 122/119 Street to the power line right of way as shown in Plan 1225 KS; 6. west along the power line right of way to Blackmud Creek; 7. in a southeasterly direction along Blackmud Creek to the north boundary of Sec. 29, Twp. 51, Rge. 24 W4; 8. east along the north boundary of Secs. 29 and 28, Twp. 51, Rge. 24 W4 to Gateway Boulevard; 9. south along Gateway Boulevard to the south Edmonton city boundary; 10. west along the south city boundary to the left bank of the North Saskatchewan River; 11. generally north and northeast along the left bank of the North Saskatchewan River to the starting point.
Note:

46 Edmonton-McClung 2010 boundaries
Bordering districts
North	East	West	South
Edmonton-McClung and Edmonton-Riverview	Edmonton-Rutherford	Edmonton-McClung	Edmonton-South West
Legal description from the Statutes of Alberta 2010, Electoral Divisions Act.

=== Representation history ===
Edmonton-Whitemud
Assembly	Years	Member	Party
Riding created from Strathcona Centre and Strathcona West
17th	1971–1975	Don Getty	Progressive Conservative
18th	1975–1979	Don Getty	Progressive Conservative
19th	1979–1982	Peter Knaak	Progressive Conservative
20th	1982–1985	Robert Alexander	Progressive Conservative
20th	1985–1986	Don Getty	Progressive Conservative
21st	1986–1989	Don Getty	Progressive Conservative
22nd	1989–1993	Percy Wickman	Liberal
23rd	1993–1997	Mike Percy	Liberal
24th	1997–2001	Dave Hancock	Progressive Conservative
25th	2001–2004	Dave Hancock	Progressive Conservative
26th	2004–2008	Dave Hancock	Progressive Conservative
27th	2008–2012	Dave Hancock	Progressive Conservative
28th	2012–2014	Dave Hancock	Progressive Conservative
28th	2014–2015	Stephen Mandel	Progressive Conservative
29th	2015–2019	Bob Turner	New Democratic
30th	2019–2023	Rakhi Pancholi	New Democratic
31st	2023–Present	Rakhi Pancholi	New Democratic

The electoral district was created in the 1971 boundary redistribution. The first representative was former Canadian Football League player Don Getty. Getty had previously represented the electoral district of Strathcona West. The 1971 election saw Getty easily win the new district to pick it up for the Progressive Conservatives.

Getty won a larger majority in 1975 and he retired for the first time from the legislature in 1979. His replacement was Progressive Conservative Peter Knaak, who easily held the district for a single term before leaving in 1982. Robert Alexander took over as the Progressive Conservative in 1982.

Alexander resigned November 5, 1985, so that Getty, who had just been elected as leader of the Progressive Conservatives and premier of the province, could have his seat back. Getty easily won the by-election held on December 11, 1985. Less than a year later Getty called his first election as premier. He easily won the district back along with a majority government across the province.

The 1989 general election would turn out to be one of the most memorable in Alberta political history.text Getty was defeated in a closely contested race by Liberal candidate Percy Wickman. The result was a surprise as Getty's party had won a majority across the province. The trouble for Getty's campaign started when he skipped an all-candidates forum which Wickman had put a rubber chicken in his place. He was also criticized heavily even by his own party members for running a billion dollars in spending announcements.

Wickman held the seat for one term before running in the Edmonton-Rutherford electoral district in 1993. His replacement was Liberal candidate Mike Percy, who won a comfortable margin over Dave Hancock. Percy only held the district for one term.

Hancock ran as the Progressive Conservative candidate for the second time in the 1997 general election. He was re-elected three more times. Hancock became interim Premier of Alberta in March 2015. The end of his tenure came in September of that year when Jim Prentice was elected as leader of the PCs and subsequently sworn in as premier. Hancock resigned from the legislature around the same time. A by-election was held in October, and the successful candidate was Stephen Mandel, whom Prentice had named as Minister for Health, despite not holding a seat in the assembly. Mandel was defeated in May 2015 by Bob Turner of the NDP.

== Legislative election results ==
=== 1971 ===
1971 Alberta general election
Party	Candidate	Votes	%
Progressive Conservative	Don Getty	8,201	58.32%
Social Credit	Donald Hamilton	4,690	33.35%
New Democratic	Joseph Mercredi	936	6.66%
Liberal	Jim Tanner	235	1.67%
Total		14,062	–
Rejected, spoiled and declined		125	–
Eligible electors / turnout		17,279	82.11%
Source(s) Source: "Edmonton-Whitemud Official Results 1971 Alberta general election". Alberta Heritage Community Foundation.

=== 1975 ===
1975 Alberta general election
Party	Candidate	Votes	%	±%
Progressive Conservative	Don Getty	9,614	67.75%	9.43%
New Democratic	Lila Fahlman	2,645	18.64%	11.98%
Social Credit	Phil Dickson	1,101	7.76%	-25.59%
Liberal	Dilys Andersen	830	5.85%	4.18%
Total		14,190	–	–
Rejected, spoiled and declined		20	–	–
Eligible electors / turnout		23,949	59.33%	–
Progressive Conservative hold		Swing		10.71%
Source(s) Source: "Edmonton-Whitemud Official Results 1975 Alberta general election". Alberta Heritage Community Foundation.

=== 1979 ===
1979 Alberta general election
Party	Candidate	Votes	%	±%
Progressive Conservative	Peter Knaak	6,833	57.62%	-10.13%
New Democratic	Ted Paszek	2,122	17.90%	-0.74%
Liberal	Don Milliken	1,964	16.56%	10.71%
Social Credit	Larry Heth	939	7.92%	0.16%
Total		11,858	–	–
Rejected, spoiled and declined		18	–	–
Eligible electors / turnout		19,899	59.81%	–
Progressive Conservative hold		Swing		-5.44%
Source(s) Source: "Edmonton-Whitemud Official Results 1979 Alberta general election". Alberta Heritage Community Foundation.

=== 1982 ===
1982 Alberta general election
Party	Candidate	Votes	%	±%
Progressive Conservative	Robert Alexander	10,696	59.05%	1.43%
New Democratic	Leslie Bella	4,884	26.97%	9.07%
Western Canada Concept	Erika Guidera	1,209	6.67%	–
Liberal	Phil Lister	791	4.37%	-12.19%
Independent	Joe Trenchy	291	1.61%	–
Social Credit	Keith Schultz	241	1.33%	-6.59%
Total		18,112	–	–
Rejected, spoiled and declined		24	–	–
Eligible electors / turnout		27,925	64.95%	–
Progressive Conservative hold		Swing		5.25%
Source(s) Source: "Edmonton-Whitemud Official Results 1982 Alberta general election". Alberta Heritage Community Foundation.

=== 1985 by-election ===
Alberta provincial by-election, December 11, 1985 following the resignation of Robert Keith Alexander on November 5, 1985
Party	Candidate	Votes	%	±%
Progressive Conservative	Don Getty	5,955	60.15	1.10
New Democratic	Tony Higgins	2,100	21.21	−5.76
Representative	Dick Mather	800	8.08	–
Liberal	Eric Wolfman	637	6.43	2.06
Independent	Lucien Maynard	355	3.59	–
Heritage	Mike Pawlus	53	0.54	–
Total		9,900	–	–
Rejected, spoiled and declined		10	–	–
Eligible electors / turnout		30,082	32.94	–
Progressive Conservative hold		Swing		3.43
Source(s) Source: "Edmonton-Whitemud Official By-election Results". Elections Alberta. December 11, 1985.

=== 1986 ===
1986 Alberta general election
Party	Candidate	Votes	%	±%
Progressive Conservative	Don Getty	7,436	57.76%	−2.39%
New Democratic	Tony Higgins	3,875	30.10%	8.89%
Liberal	Eric Wolfman	1,135	8.82%	2.39%
Representative	Bert Beinert	336	2.61%	−5.61%
Western Canada Concept	Walter Stack	92	0.71%	–
Total		12,874	–	–
Rejected, spoiled and declined		40	–	–
Eligible electors / turnout		23,348	55.31%	–
Progressive Conservative hold		Swing		−5.64%
Source(s) Source: "Edmonton-Whitemud Official Results 1986 Alberta general election". Alberta Heritage Community Foundation.

=== 1989 ===
1989 Alberta general election
Party	Candidate	Votes	%	±%
Liberal	Percy Wickman	8,350	45.25%	36.43%
Progressive Conservative	Don Getty	8,005	43.38%	-14.38%
New Democratic	Nao Fernando	2,099	11.37%	-18.73%
Total		18,454	–	–
Rejected, spoiled and declined		42	–	–
Eligible electors / turnout		31,536	58.65%	–
Liberal gain from Progressive Conservative		Swing		25.41%
Source(s) Source: "Edmonton-Whitemud Official Results 1989 Alberta general election". Alberta Heritage Community Foundation.

=== 1993 ===
1993 Alberta general election
Party	Candidate	Votes	%	±%
Liberal	Mike Percy	8,628	58.44%	13.20%
Progressive Conservative	David Hancock	5,351	36.25%	-7.13%
New Democratic	Daniel Aitken	648	4.39%	-6.98%
Greens	Robert Wilde	73	0.49%	–
Natural Law	Richard Shelford	63	0.43%	–
Total		14,763	–	–
Rejected, spoiled and declined		27	–	–
Eligible electors / Turnout		21,125	70.01%	11.36%
Liberal hold		Swing		10.16%
Source(s) Source: "Edmonton-Whitemud Official Results 1993 Alberta general election". Alberta Heritage Community Foundation.

=== 1997 ===
1997 Alberta general election
Party	Candidate	Votes	%	±%
Progressive Conservative	David Hancock	7,973	51.00%	14.76%
Liberal	Corky Meyer	5,953	38.08%	-20.36%
New Democratic	Charan Khehra	1,012	6.47%	2.08%
Social Credit	Kevin Bialobzyski	635	4.06%	–
Natural Law	Randy T. Fritz	59	0.38%	-0.05%
Total		15,632	–	–
Rejected, spoiled and declined		64	67	3
Eligible electors / Turnout		25,555	61.43%	-8.58%
Progressive Conservative gain from Liberal		Swing		-4.64%
Source(s) Source: "Edmonton-Whitemud Official Results 1997 Alberta general election". Alberta Heritage Community Foundation. Alberta. Chief Electoral Officer (1997). Report of the Chief Electoral Officer, November, 1996 general enumeration and Tuesday, March 11, 1997 general election Twenty-fourth Legislative Assembly. Edmonton: Alberta Legislative Assembly, Office of the Chief Electoral Officer. pp. 222–225.

=== 2001 ===
2001 Alberta general election
Party	Candidate	Votes	%	±%
Progressive Conservative	David Hancock	10,884	58.63%	7.62%
Liberal	Bruce King	6,503	35.03%	-3.05%
New Democratic	Katie Oppen Benschop	1,178	6.35%	-0.13%
Total		18,565	–	–
Rejected, spoiled and declined		51	26	5
Eligible electors / Turnout		30,853	60.35%	-1.08%
Progressive Conservative hold		Swing		5.34%
Source(s) Source: "Edmonton-Whitemud Official Results 2001 Alberta general election". Alberta Heritage Community Foundation. Alberta. Chief Electoral Officer (2001). The report of the Chief Electoral Officer on the 2000 provincial confirmation process and Monday, March 12, 2001, Provincial General Election of the twenty-fifth Legislative Assembly. Edmonton: Alberta Legislative Assembly, Office of the Chief Electoral Officer. pp. 194–197.

=== 2004 ===
2004 Alberta general election
Party	Candidate	Votes	%	±%
Progressive Conservative	Dave Hancock	7,494	46.13%	−12.15
Liberal	Donna Smith	6,568	40.43%	+5.40
New Democratic	Brian Fleck	1,639	10.09%	+3.75
Alberta Alliance	Kathy Rayner	471	2.90%	
Independent	John Andrews	74	0.45%	
Total		16,246		
Rejected, spoiled, and declined		89		
Eligible electors / turnout		30,949	52.77%	
Progressive Conservative hold		Swing		−8.78
"Edmonton-Whitemud Statement of Official Results 2004 Alberta general election" (PDF). Elections Alberta.

=== 2008 ===
2008 Alberta general election
Party	Candidate	Votes	%	±%
Progressive Conservative	David Hancock	12,054	58.47%	12.34%
Liberal	Nancy A. Cavanaugh	6,997	33.94%	-6.49%
New Democratic	Hana Razga	1,023	4.96%	-5.13%
Green	Valerie Kennedy	543	2.63%	–
Total		20,617	–	–
Rejected, spoiled and declined		85	28	7
Eligible electors / Turnout		42,793	48.39%	-4.25%
Progressive Conservative hold		Swing		9.41%
Source(s) Source: "42 - Edmonton-Whitemud, 2008 Alberta general election". officialresults.elections.ab.ca. Elections Alberta. Chief Electoral Officer (2008). The Report on the March 3, 2008 Provincial General Election of the Twenty-Seventh Legislative Assembly (Report). Edmonton, Alta.: Elections Alberta. pp. 340–345.

=== 2012 ===
2012 Alberta general election
Party	Candidate	Votes	%	±%
Progressive Conservative	David Hancock	12,123	60.74%	2.27%
Wildrose Alliance	Ian Crawford	3,307	16.57%	–
Liberal	Rick Szostak	2,356	11.80%	-22.13%
New Democratic	Jim Graves	1,728	8.66%	3.70%
Alberta Party	Julia Necheff	446	2.23%	–
Total		19,960	–	–
Rejected, spoiled and declined		109	61	10
Eligible electors / Turnout		34,015	59.03%	10.64%
Progressive Conservative hold		Swing		9.82%
Source(s) Source: "46 - Edmonton-Whitemud, 2012 Alberta general election". officialresults.elections.ab.ca. Elections Alberta. Chief Electoral Officer (2012). The Report of the Chief Electoral Officer on the 2011 Provincial Enumeration and Monday, April 23, 2012 Provincial General Election of the Twenty-eighth Legislative Assembly (PDF) (Report). Edmonton, Alta.: Elections Alberta. pp. 272–275. Archived (PDF) from the original on May 6, 2021.

=== 2014 by-election ===
Alberta provincial by-election, October 27, 2014 Resignation of Dave Hancock on September 25, 2014
Party	Candidate	Votes	%	±%
Progressive Conservative	Stephen Mandel	6,003	42.39	-17.85
New Democratic	Bob Turner	3,150	22.24	13.24
Wildrose	Tim Grover	2,680	18.92	2.72
Liberal	Donna Wilson	2,033	14.35	2.39
Alberta Party	Will Munsey	202	1.43	-0.92
Green	René Malenfant	95	0.67	—
Total		14,163	—	—
Rejected, spoiled and declined		14	11	17
Eligible electors / turnout		35,795	39.36	-19.67
Progressive Conservative hold		Swing		-15.54
Source(s) Alberta. Chief Electoral Officer (2015). Report on the October 27, 2014 By-elections in: Calgary-Elbow, Calgary-Foothills, Calgary-West, Edmonton-Whitemud (PDF) (Report). Edmonton: Legislative Assembly of Alberta; Chief Electoral Officer. ISBN 978-098653678-6.

=== 2015 ===
2015 Alberta general election
Party	Candidate	Votes	%	±%
New Democratic	Bob Turner	12,805	57.45%	35.21%
Progressive Conservative	Stephen Mandel	7,177	32.20%	-10.19%
Wildrose	Chad Peters	1,423	6.38%	-12.94%
Liberal	Steven Townsend	629	2.82%	-11.53%
Green	Kathryn Jackson	182	0.82%	0.15%
Independent	John Baloun	73	0.33%	–
Total		22,289	–	–
Rejected, spoiled and declined		57	45	11
Eligible electors / turnout		37,018	60.39%	21.03%
New Democratic gain from Progressive Conservative		Swing		22.70%
Source(s) Source: "46 - Edmonton-Whitemud, 2015 Alberta general election". officialresults.elections.ab.ca. Elections Alberta. Chief Electoral Officer (2016). 2015 General Election. A Report of the Chief Electoral Officer (PDF) (Report). Edmonton, Alta.: Elections Alberta. pp. 254–258.

=== 2019 ===
2019 Alberta general election
Party	Candidate	Votes	%	±%
New Democratic	Rakhi Pancholi	11,373	49.18%	-8.27%
United Conservative	Elisabeth Hughes	9,120	39.44%	0.86%
Alberta Party	Jonathan Dai	2,335	10.10%	–
Freedom Conservative	Jason Norris	297	1.28%	–
Total		23,125	–	–
Rejected, spoiled and declined		63	76	18
Eligible electors / turnout		32,810	70.73%	10.33%
New Democratic hold		Swing		-7.75%
Source(s) Source: "46 - Edmonton-Whitemud, 2019 Alberta general election". officialresults.elections.ab.ca. Elections Alberta. Alberta. Chief Electoral Officer (2019). 2019 General Election. A Report of the Chief Electoral Officer. Volume II (PDF) (Report). Vol. 2. Edmonton, Alta.: Elections Alberta. pp. 180–183. ISBN 978-1-988620-12-1.

=== 2023 ===
2023 Alberta general election
Party	Candidate	Votes	%	±%
New Democratic	Rakhi Pancholi	12,797	60.40	+11.22
United Conservative	Raj Sherman	7,799	36.81	-2.63
Liberal	Donna Wilson	370	1.75	–
Green	Cheri Hawley	221	1.04	–
Total		21,187	99.29	–
Rejected and declined		152	0.71	
Turnout		21,339	64.65	
Eligible voters		33,005		
New Democratic hold		Swing		+6.92
Source(s) Source: Elections Alberta

== Senate nominee election results ==
=== 2004 ===
2004 Senate nominee election results: Edmonton-Whitemud				Turnout 52.60%	
Affiliation	Candidate	Votes	% votes	% ballots	Rank
Progressive Conservative	Betty Unger	6,147	17.17%	51.83%	2
Progressive Conservative	Bert Brown	4,750	13.27%	40.05%	1
Independent	Link Byfield	4,438	12.40%	37.42%	4
Progressive Conservative	Cliff Breitkreuz	4,396	12.28%	37.07%	3
Progressive Conservative	David Usherwood	3,275	9.15%	27.61%	6
Progressive Conservative	Jim Silye	2,873	8.03%	24.22%	5
Alberta Alliance	Michael Roth	2,724	7.61%	22.97%	7
Independent	Tom Sindlinger	2,712	7.58%	22.87%	9
Alberta Alliance	Gary Horan	2,294	6.41%	18.96%	10
Alberta Alliance	Vance Gough	2,189	6.10%	18.46%	8
Total votes		35,798	100%		
Total ballots		11,860	3.02 votes per ballot		
Rejected, spoiled and declined		4,418			

Voters had the option of selecting four candidates on the ballot

== Nomination contests ==
UCP Edmonton-Whitemud nomination contest: February 23, 2023

Candidate	Votes	%
Raj Sherman	322	78.0
Varun Chandrasekar	84	20.3
David Masieyi	7	1.7
Total	413	100.0

== Student vote results ==
=== 2004 ===
Participating schools
Earl Buxton School
George P. Nicholson School
Riverbend Junior High
St.Mary Elementary
Vernon Barford Junior High School

On November 19, 2004, a student vote was conducted at participating Alberta schools to parallel the 2004 Alberta general election results. The vote was designed to educate students and simulate the electoral process for persons who have not yet reached the legal majority. The vote was conducted in 80 of the 83 provincial electoral districts with students voting for actual election candidates. Schools with a large student body that reside in another electoral district had the option to vote for candidates outside of the electoral district then where they were physically located.

2004 Alberta student vote results
Affiliation	Candidate	Votes	%
Progressive Conservative	Dave Hancock	404	37.79%
Liberal	Donna Smith	364	34.05%
NDP	Brian Fleck	218	20.39%
Alberta Alliance	Kathy Rayner	45	4.21%
Independent	John Andrews	38	3.56%
Total		1,069	100%
Rejected, spoiled and declined		14	

=== 2012 ===
2012 Alberta student vote results
Affiliation	Candidate	Votes	%
Progressive Conservative	Dave Hancock		%
Wildrose	Ian Crawford		
Liberal	Rick Szostak		%
Alberta Party	Julia Necheff		
NDP	Jim Graves		%
Total			100%

== See also ==
- List of Alberta provincial electoral districts
- Canadian provincial electoral districts
