= Mike Pawlus =

Leader of The Heritage Party of Alberta
- In office 1984–1987
- Preceded by: New position
- Succeeded by: Party abolished

Personal details
- Born: October 27, 1923
- Died: April 17, 2010 (aged 86) Edmonton, Alberta
- Party: The Heritage Party

Mike Pawlus (1923-2010) was a minor provincial level politician from Alberta, Canada. He led the right-wing Heritage Party of Alberta during the entire existence of the party.

== Political career ==
After the Heritage Party was founded in 1984 and registered with Elections Alberta, Pawlus, a "semi-retired engineer and businessman," became leader. He first ran for a seat in the Alberta Legislature in the Spirit River-Fairview by-election held on February 21, 1985. Pawlus and the Heritage Party won just 18 votes in the election, finishing last in a field of 17 candidates. He lost to Jim Gurnett of the New Democratic Party.

Pawlus ran for his second attempt at office in the Edmonton-Whitemud by-election held on December 11, 1985. He improved his performance but still finished last and lost to Premier Don Getty this time, only winning 53 votes for a vote share of 0.54%.

Pawlus led the Heritage Party into the failed coalition with the Western Canada Concept and Social Credit that created the Alberta Political Alliance in 1986. The Heritage Party left the coalition and ran candidates under its own banner in the 1986 general election.

Pawlus ran in the electoral district of Edmonton-Mill Woods, finishing last in the field of five candidates. He lost to New Democrat candidate Gerry Gibeault and garnered just 132 votes. Pawlus managed to field five other candidates earning 601 votes in total across the province. Pawlus did not return to provincial politics after the 1986 general election.

Mike Pawlus died April 17, 2010, at the age of 86 in Edmonton.
