= Don Getty =

Canadian athlete, businessman and politician from Alberta (1933–2016)

The Honourable Don Getty OC AOE
- Official portrait, 1990s

11th Premier of Alberta
- In office November 1, 1985 – December 14, 1992
- Monarch: Elizabeth II
- Lieutenant Governor: Helen Hunley; Gordon Towers
- Preceded by: Peter Lougheed
- Succeeded by: Ralph Klein

Leader of the Progressive Conservative Association of Alberta
- In office October 13, 1985 – November 28, 1992
- Preceded by: Peter Lougheed
- Succeeded by: Ralph Klein

Minister of Energy and Natural Resources
- In office March 1975 – March 1979
- Premier: Peter Lougheed
- Preceded by: Portfolio established
- Succeeded by: Merv Leitch

Minister of Federal and Intergovernmental Affairs
- In office September 10, 1971 – March 1975
- Premier: Peter Lougheed
- Preceded by: Portfolio established
- Succeeded by: Lou Hyndman

Member of the Legislative Assembly of Alberta
- In office May 9, 1989 – December 14, 1992
- Preceded by: Brian Downey
- Succeeded by: District abolished
- Constituency: Stettler
- In office December 11, 1985 – March 20, 1989
- Preceded by: Robert Alexander
- Succeeded by: Percy Wickman
- Constituency: Edmonton-Whitemud
- In office August 30, 1971 – March 14, 1979
- Preceded by: District established
- Succeeded by: Peter Knaak
- Constituency: Edmonton-Whitemud
- In office May 23, 1967 – August 30, 1971
- Preceded by: Randolph McKinnon
- Succeeded by: District abolished
- Constituency: Strathcona West

Personal details
- Born: Donald Ross Getty; August 30, 1933 Westmount, Quebec, Canada
- Died: February 26, 2016 (aged 82) Edmonton, Alberta, Canada
- Party: Progressive Conservative
- Spouse: Margaret Mitchell (m. 1955)
- Children: 4
- Education: University of Western Ontario
- Occupation: Businessman; athlete
- Football career

No. 27, 87
- Position: Quarterback

Personal information
- Listed height: 6 ft 2 in (1.88 m)
- Listed weight: 195 lb (88 kg)

Career information
- College: Western Ontario

Career history
- 1955–1965: Edmonton Eskimos

Awards and highlights
- 2× Grey Cup champion (1955, 1956); Outstanding Canadian, Western Interprovincial Football Union (1959); Runner up, Schenley Award (1959); Edmonton Eskimos Wall of Honour (1992)

Donald Ross Getty OC AOE (August 30, 1933 – February 26, 2016) was a Canadian athlete, businessman, and politician who served as the 11th premier of Alberta between 1985 and 1992.

Before entering politics, Getty had been a quarterback for the Edmonton Eskimos of the Canadian Football League. He passed for more than eight thousand yards over his ten-year career. A member of the Progressive Conservatives, he served as Energy Minister and Federal and Intergovernmental Affairs Minister in the government of Peter Lougheed before leaving politics for the private sector in 1979. He returned to politics six years later to enter the Progressive Conservative leadership contest resulting from Lougheed's retirement. He defeated two other candidates, and became Premier November 1, 1985.

As Premier, Getty was faced with an economic slowdown and falling energy prices, which hit Alberta's petroleum-dominated economy hard. Faced with mounting government deficits and increasing unemployment, he cut social spending and intervened with government money to prevent businesses from failing. Several of these interventions backfired in high-profile fashion, failing at their intended objective and costing scarce public funds as well. While some analysts argue that Getty's fiscal program laid the groundwork for Ralph Klein's later balancing of the provincial budget, on Getty's departure from office the government's debt had reached $11 billion, setting the stage for his successor to characterize the Getty years as an era of wasteful and excessive spending.

His efforts at strengthening Alberta's presence in Canada initially appeared more successful, as he won the agreement of Canada's other first ministers in including elements of Senate reform in the Meech Lake and Charlottetown Accords, but these efforts came to naught when both accords were rejected—the second by the Canadian public, including a majority of Albertans. Getty was also facing political problems within Alberta, including a defeat in his home riding of Edmonton-Whitemud in the 1989 election (leading to a successful by-election in Stettler, vacated by a PC MLA) and leadership machinations from some of his own ministers. In light of this, he resigned the Premiership in 1992. The same year, Getty was put on the Edmonton Eskimos Wall of Fame.

== Early life ==
Don Getty was born on August 30, 1933, in Westmount, Quebec, the son of Beatrice Lillian (Hampton) Getty (1910–1973) and Charles Ross Getty (1909–1974). His father had dropped out of McGill University's medical school due to the Great Depression and worked a variety of jobs—sometimes more than one at a time—to support his wife, three sons, and two daughters. Getty's childhood was spent in Verdun, Toronto, Ottawa, London, and Agincourt, sharing a three-room apartment with his seven-member family in the last. Returning for London in time for high school, he became an accomplished athlete (drinking eggnog to gain enough weight to play football) and was elected students' council president. Sports were his passion, and he was an especially great fan of the Montreal Canadiens and of Toronto Argonauts running back Royal Copeland.

== University football ==
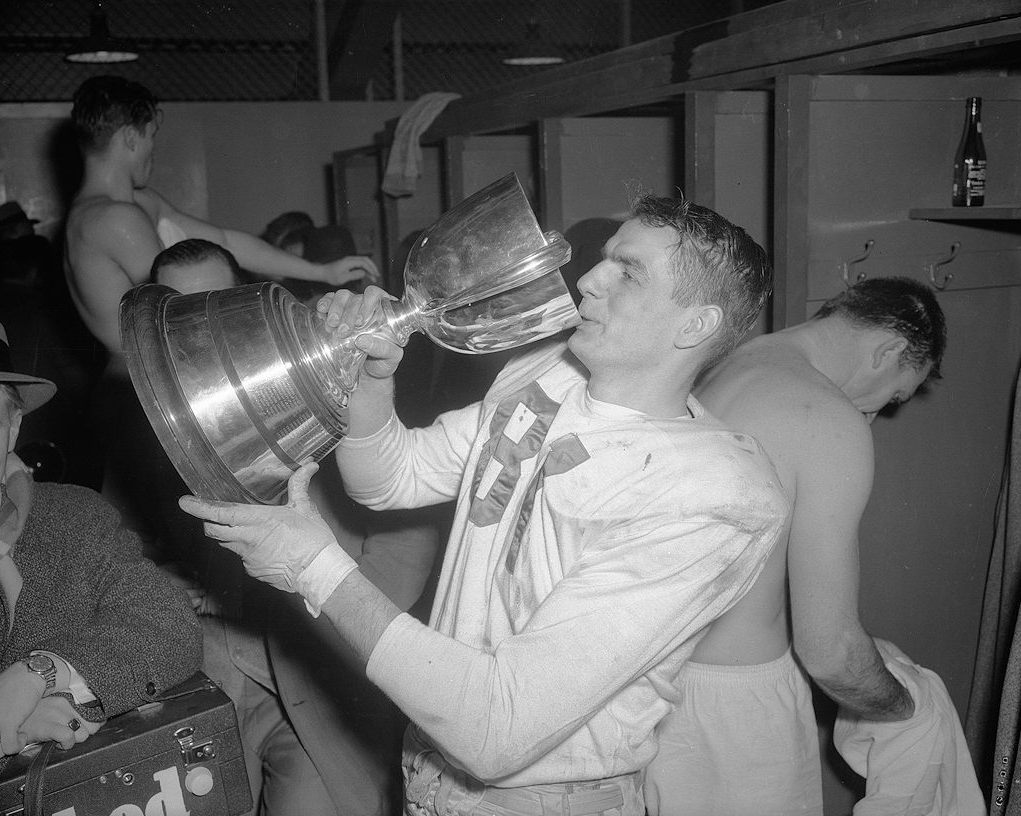
Getty after winning the 44th Grey Cup in 1956.

After graduating, Getty enrolled to study business administration at the University of Western Ontario, where he became a football star and a member of The Kappa Alpha Society. He quarterbacked the Western Ontario Mustangs to Eastern Collegiate Union Championships in 1954 and 1955, and was awarded the Claude Brown Memorial Trophy as the outstanding athlete at UWO in 1955. He also played basketball, and was part of championship teams in that sport in 1952, 1953, and 1954. In football and basketball, he was coached by John P. Metras. A week after 1955 graduation, Getty married Margaret Mitchell, his high school sweetheart. The Edmonton Eskimos had offered Getty a professional contract, so the newlyweds drove out west in an old blue Buick.

== Professional football career ==
Getty played 10 seasons with the Edmonton Eskimos as a quarterback. For the first part of his career, he backed up Jackie Parker and filled in for him when he was moved to running back. Eskimos coach Pop Ivy surprised many observers when he started Getty at quarterback in the third game of the 1956 western final (which was a three-game series at the time) during the 44th Grey Cup, with Parker at running back. However, it bore results as Parker tied the record for most touchdowns scored in a Grey Cup game, at three. Getty also handed the ball to Johnny Bright for two touchdowns and scored two himself on quarterback keeps from the one-yard line, as the Eskimos won their third consecutive championship over the Montreal Alouettes by a score of 50–27. He continued with Eskimos until 1963, and also made three appearances in the 1965 season.

Getty was one of the most successful Canadian-born quarterbacks in the history of the Canadian Football League and sits at third on the all-time passing yardage list of Canadian quarterbacks, behind Russ Jackson and Gerry Dattilio, with nearly nine thousand yards. He was declared the outstanding Canadian player in the Western Interprovincial Football Union in 1959, and was the runner up (to Jackson) for the Schenley Award as the league's most outstanding Canadian player the same year. He was placed on the Eskimos' Wall of Honor in 1992.

=== Career statistics ===
		Passing						Rushing^{1}				
Season	Team	PA	PC	Pct	Yds	TD	Int	Car	Yds	Avg	TD	Long
1955	Edm	63	35	55.6%	558	7	5	32	35	1.1	0	18
1956	Edm	44	18	40.9%	256	3	3	11	-24	-2.2	0	8
1957	Edm	122	83	68.0%	1,359	11	8	17	-15	-0.9	0	8
1958	Edm	60	23	38.3%	334	1	2	15	29	1.9	0	6
1959	Edm	198	116	58.6%	2,080	10	11	29	134	4.6	0	17
1960	Edm	82	39	47.6%	674	3	4	11	44	4.0	0	16
1961	Edm	126	69	54.8%	1,276	8	8	16	67	4.2	0	18
1962	Edm	163	92	56.4%	1,465	8	9	11	35	3.1	0	11
1963	Edm	125	64	51.2%	913	6	8	7	14	2	1	11
1965	Edm	9	4	44.4%	37	1	2	0	0	0	0	0
Total		992	543	54.7%	8,952	58	60	149	318	2.1	1	18

^{1}Until and including the 1958 season, a tackle for a loss on a passing play was registered as a rushing attempt.

== Early political career ==
=== Oil and gas career ===
While still playing football, Getty was hired by Imperial Oil in 1955. Starting in 1961, he worked for Midwestern Industrial Gas Limited as a Lands and Contracts Manager before a 1963 promotion to Assistant General Manager. In 1964 Getty founded his own company, Baldonnel Oil and Gas Company.

=== MLA and cabinet minister ===
In 1965, Getty was approached by fellow Eskimos veteran and Progressive Conservative leader Peter Lougheed to run in the 1967 provincial election. Getty agreed to run in Strathcona West, and defeated incumbent Social Crediter Randolph McKinnon by more than one thousand votes. He entered the Legislative Assembly of Alberta as one of six newly elected PCs.

Four years later, in the 1971 election, Getty was re-elected by more than 3,500 votes in the new riding of Edmonton-Whitemud and was appointed Minister of Federal and Intergovernmental Affairs in the new Lougheed majority government. With Getty and the government both re-elected by increasing margins in the 1975 election, Lougheed appointed him Minister of Energy. In this capacity Getty partially continued his responsibility for relations with the federal government, as energy policy was a major sticking point between the two governments (at one point, federal Energy Minister Donald Macdonald called Getty "dripping with venom").

Getty did not seek re-election in the 1979 election.

=== Investment career ===
In 1967 he started a career in finance as a partner with Doherty, Roadhouse, and McCuaig investments. After refusing to seek re-election in 1979, Getty became the head of an investment firm and sat on the boards of a number of corporations, including the Royal Bank of Canada, Sparrow Energy, Nortek Energy and Celanese Canada.

== Premier of Alberta ==
When Peter Lougheed stepped down from the Progressive Conservative leadership in 1985, Getty entered the contest to replace him and immediately became the favourite. At an October convention, Getty won a second ballot victory against Minister of Municipal Affairs Julian Koziak and former legislator Ron Ghitter. Getty was appointed Premier November 1, 1985. He returned to the legislature just over a month later, winning a by-election in his old riding of Edmonton-Whitemud. As Premier for nearly seven years, Getty presided over some of Alberta's toughest economic times. His time in office was characterized by attempts to reduce the government's budget deficit and interventions calculated to stabilize the economy during the recession of the 1980s. When Getty became Premier he left his predecessor's cabinet completely intact.

=== Budget deficit ===
After Getty won the party leadership, Lougheed told him to expect a budget deficit of $2.5 billion in his first year in office, though the figure turned out to be $2.1 billion. Things got worse the next year as a drop in energy prices led to the oil-rich province running a deficit of $3.4 billion, as energy revenues fell by $3 billion. Getty's Treasurer, Dick Johnston, reacted by raising taxes by $1 billion and cutting program spending by 6.3%, including decreases of 3% in grants to schools, universities, municipalities, and hospitals. In 1990, due to these measures, Johnston predicted that the government would be in surplus by the 1995 fiscal year. By 1992, program spending was growing at a rate of 2.3% annually, among the lowest rates in Canada. In fact, when adjusted for population growth and inflation, government spending fell over Getty's term in office, with non-health care program spending 40% lower in 1993 than it had been in 1986 (health spending had remained approximately constant over the same period). Even so, Getty entered the premiership with no public debt and left with the public debt at $11 billion.

=== Economic intervention ===
Getty's government was faced with a combination of a general economic malaise and falling oil prices. The slowdown in the energy sector contributed to a decrease in capital spending, which reduced demand for labour in the construction industry by 50% between 1980 and 1985. Many workers left the province, which suppressed real estate prices and hurt financial institutions; two Albertan banks, the Canadian Commercial Bank and the Northland Bank, failed in September 1985. Credit unions were facing similar troubles, and the Lougheed government had, in its last days, injected $100 million into the industry.

Getty's response to these issues was interventionist. During his first budget, he targeted spending at the province's struggling agricultural sector, including a $2 billion loan program meant to address high interest rates. His government tried to stimulate the energy sector by making loan guarantees to Husky Oil ($380 million) and Syncrude ($200 million) for new and expanded capital projects. The government also provided a $55 million guarantee—in addition to a $20 million loan—to Peter Pocklington's Gainers meat-packing plant; when Pocklington defaulted on the loan, the government seized, and eventually closed, the plant. This incident and others contributed to a perception that Getty's administration was willing to spend public money to support large businesses, but that it was indifferent to the struggles of labour (the Gainers loan had initially been made after the government brokered a labour settlement favourable to the plant's management). In 1986 the price of oil bottomed at $US10 a barrel. Getty responded by providing the oil industry with $250 million in incentives and royalty cuts. By the end of 1986 Alberta had granted another nine-month cut from 12% to 1% in royalties at the Suncor oilsands.

Most damaging to the government's reputation was the failure of the Principal Group, an Edmonton-based trust company. Its investment subsidiaries were ordered shut down June 30, 1987, by court orders obtained at the instigation of Provincial Treasurer Dick Johnston. The parent company went bankrupt August 10 amid accusations of fraud. A court-ordered investigation led by Bill Code found that the company was in trouble as early as 1980 and, though subsequent economic downturns hurt it, "it would not have been profitable in any event". It also found that Consumer and Corporate Affairs Minister Connie Osterman had disregarded 1984 warnings from a regulator in her department that the company was likely insolvent. Though Osterman was fired shortly after the report's release, Getty's immediate offer of an $85 million settlement to investors further hurt the government's reputation in areas of business.

A similar incident stemmed from the 1992 privatization of Alberta Government Telephones (AGT). NovaTel, a cellular subsidiary of AGT, had made a number of financing deals with local companies in the late 1980s, and many of these deals were collapsing just as the government was prepared to sell AGT. At the last moment, the government removed NovaTel from the AGT share offering. NovaTel's liabilities eventually cost the government more than $600 million.

=== Intergovernmental and constitutional affairs ===
As a former Minister of Federal and Intergovernmental Affairs, Getty had strong views about constitutional matters, and about Senate reform in particular. He made the cause the centrepiece of Alberta's constitutional policy going into the Meech Lake Accord discussions. The Accord's final version included a provision whereby the Prime Minister would continue to recommend senatorial appointments to the Governor General, but would have to make their recommendations from lists provided by the provincial governments. Once it became apparent that the Meech Lake Accord would fail, Getty's government introduced the Senatorial Selection Act, which provided for an election process whenever there was a vacant Senate seat for Alberta. However, Getty's favoured candidate, Progressive Conservative Bert Brown, was soundly defeated by Stan Waters of the upstart Reform Party of Canada, which opposed Meech Lake and favoured aggressive senate reform. Though Prime Minister Brian Mulroney opposed the legislation, he eventually recommended Waters for appointment to the Senate. Getty was still more successful at pursuing senate reform during the negotiations for the Charlottetown Accord, when he won the addition of a Triple-E Senate to the package, against Mulroney's opposition. However, the Charlottetown Accord failed after a national referendum in which a majority of Canadians, including 60.2% of Albertans, rejected it.

In 1991, Getty's Progressive Conservatives formally severed ties with the Progressive Conservative Party of Canada, which was becoming increasingly unpopular under Mulroney. Getty also broke with Mulroney on a number of issues other than Senate reform, including the new federal Goods and Services Tax, which he fought unsuccessfully against implementing. His government also implemented legislation, against Mulroney's express wishes, that made English the only official language of Alberta. Despite these steps, Getty remained a supporter of the federal Conservatives (and not the Reform Party, to which many provincial PCs were defecting), whose unpopularity rubbed off on him.

Getty's government also made progress on aboriginal land claims in the northern part of the province. In addition to creating Canada's first Métis land base in 1989, Getty took the lead in an ultimately unsuccessful effort to negotiate a settlement between the federal government and the Lubicon Cree.

=== Political style ===
In contrast to his predecessor, who was actively involved in most elements of his government, Getty preferred to set the government's broad direction and leave lower-level details to his ministers. Ralph Klein, while serving as Environment Minister under Getty, commented that "If you are a minister, you run that portfolio yourself" and expressed an appreciation for the freedom that the Premier gave his cabinet. Al Adair, who served in two different portfolios under Getty, described this approach in his memoirs as "you make the decisions, you run your department, but make mistakes and you're gone". Lisac credits him for knowing when to intervene and when not to, but Adair felt that his approach led to ministers working too much in isolation.

Getty was a private, reserved person, which, combined with his tendency to delegate to ministers, sometimes gave the impression of an uncaring aloofness. During the Principal Group affair, which he left primarily in the hands of Treasurer Dick Johnston and Consumer and Corporate Affairs Minister Elaine McCoy, a photographer captured a shot of Getty playing golf while his press secretary had said that he was "working out of the office". This was typical of his strained relationship with the media, which Adair attributed to the Premier's awkwardness and the media's unfairness.

Although Getty governed with fairly large majorities during his tenure, they were nowhere near as large as the ones Lougheed enjoyed. His first election as premier saw the return of the provincial Liberals to the legislature after being shut out for 15 years. That same election saw the Alberta NDP pick up 16 seats in the legislature. In contrast, during his last two terms, Lougheed never faced more than six opposition MLAs in total.

=== Decline and retirement ===
Getty called the 1989 election less than three years into his 1986 mandate to take advantage of the economic optimism prevalent in the province, partly as a result of the Canada-U.S. free trade agreement. While the PCs made spending promises including paving all of the province's secondary highways, the Liberals under new leader Laurence Decore stressed dealing with the deficit. The overall result was respectable for the government, as it won a sixth term in government with a net loss of only two seats. However, Getty was defeated in his own riding by Liberal Percy Wickman. Brian C. Downey resigned his seat in the rural central Alberta riding of Stettler to allow Getty to run in a by-election, which he won handily. He built a home in the riding on Buffalo Lake, and was later accused of arranging for the lake to be risen so it would be better-suited for fishing (though Adair claimed that the arrangements had been in place since 1979, when he had been Minister of Recreation, Parks and Wildlife).

Getty's relationship with his own party was often stormy. Shortly after he lost his riding in 1989, a group of Calgary Conservatives, including party budget director Jack Major and Getty's old leadership rival Ron Ghitter, began making plans to force party renewal, with or without Getty. They felt that the party was perceived as being tired, directionless, arrogant, and deaf to urban concerns, and that it was in political trouble in the crucial battleground of Calgary. At the 1989 party convention, recently retired cabinet minister Marvin Moore, who had organized Ghitter's 1985 leadership campaign, advocated for a leadership review; after a speech by Getty, the convention voted to refer the recommendation to a committee for months of study. Cabinet ministers, including Treasurer Dick Johnston and Education Minister Jim Dinning, began to consider leadership bids in the event that Getty retired or was pushed out.

In 1992, as the national referendum on the Charlottetown Accord and the release of a report on the NovaTel incident loomed, Getty decided to leave politics. In his last months, he deliberately refrained from taking measures that he knew would be popular, such as shrinking cabinet, in order to leave them for his successor. After a party leadership election chose Ralph Klein to succeed him, Getty resigned as party leader December 5 and as Premier several days later.

=== Political legacy ===
As Premier, Klein positioned himself in contrast to Getty, asserting that the government had "a spending problem", and stating that he had become Premier at a time of "uncontrolled spending". Given Klein's aggressive spending cuts, which shaped the political climate of Alberta for much of the 1990s, Getty's legacy with respect to public finances has been criticized. However, Kevin Taft, writing four years before entering politics, challenged this view, asserting that Getty was running "the tightest government in Canada". Besides its management of the deficit, Getty's government is remembered for the creation of Family Day. For the most part, however, Getty dropped quickly from the public view and public memory. Lisac suggests that this is because, unlike his predecessor and successor, he lacked a central message:

Lougheed had booming prosperity and a constant fight for provincial rights against the federal government. Klein was to be associated with balanced budgets and paying down debt. Getty never had an effective central story to tell.

== Retirement and death ==
Getty kept a low profile after leaving politics. He assumed several corporate directorships and spent time with his grandchildren. Unlike Lougheed, he rarely commented on political matters. He was appointed as an Officer to the Order of Canada in 1998.

In July 2008, after Ed Stelmach announced $2 billion in funding to industry to develop carbon capture technology, Getty's company sought some of the funding to bury carbon dioxide in salt caverns near Two Hills.

After years of declining health, Getty died from heart failure at a hospital in Edmonton, on February 26, 2016, at age 82.

== Honours ==
He was appointed as an Officer of the Order of Canada on 21 October 1998. He was appointed as a Member of the Alberta Order of Excellence in 1999. He received the Canadian version of the Queen Elizabeth II Silver Jubilee Medal in 1977, the 125th Anniversary of the Confederation of Canada Medal in 1992, the Canadian version of the Queen Elizabeth II Golden Jubilee Medal in 2002 and the Queen Elizabeth II Diamond Jubilee Medal in 2012.

In 2012 he was inducted into the London Sports Hall of Fame in London, Ontario, in recognition of his achievements in Canadian football.

On 19 November 2013 he received the honorary degree of Doctor of Laws from the University of Alberta.

Ribbon	Description	Notes
	Order of Canada (OC)	Officer 21 October 1998.
	Alberta Order of Excellence (AOE)	1999
	Queen Elizabeth II Silver Jubilee Medal	1977; Canadian version of this medal
	125th Anniversary of the Confederation of Canada Medal	1992
	Queen Elizabeth II Golden Jubilee Medal	2002; Canadian version of this medal
	Queen Elizabeth II Diamond Jubilee Medal	2012; Canadian version of this medal

== Electoral record ==
=== As party leader ===
1989 Alberta provincial election
Party	Party leader	# of candidates	Seats			Popular vote		
Party	Party leader	# of candidates	1986	1989	% Change	#	%	% Change
Progressive Conservative	Don Getty	83	61	59	-3.3%	367,244	44.29%	-7.11%
New Democrats	Ray Martin	83	16	16	0%	217,972	26.29%	-2.93%
Liberal	Laurence Decore	83	4	8	+100%	237,787	28.68%	+16.46%
Social Credit	Harvey Yuill	6	*	-	*	3,939	0.47%	*
Communist	Norman Brudy	2	-	-	-	85	0.01%	-0.02%
Independent		10	-	-	-	2,162	0.26%	-0.60%
Total		267	83	83	-	829,189	100%	
1986 Alberta provincial election
Party	Party leader	# of candidates	Seats			Popular vote		
Party	Party leader	# of candidates	1982	1986	% Change	#	%	% Change
Progressive Conservative	Don Getty	83	75	61	-18.7%	366,783	51.40%	-10.88%
New Democrats	Ray Martin	83	2	16	+700%	208,561	29.22%	+10.47%
Liberal	Nicholas Taylor	63	-	4		87,239	12.22%	+10.41%
Representative	Raymond Speaker	46	*	2	*	36,656	5.15%	*
Western Canada Concept	Jack Ramsay	20	-	-	-	4,615	0.65%	-11.11%
Confederation of Regions	Elmer Knutson	6	*	-	*	2,866	0.40%	*
Heritage	Mike Pawlus	6	*	-	*	601	0.08%	*
Communist	Norman Brudy	6	-	-	-	199	0.03%	-0.01%
Independent		20	2	-	-100%	6,134	0.86%	-3.01%
Total		333	79	83	-	713,654	100%	

* Party did not nominate candidates in the previous election.

=== As MLA ===
1967 Alberta general election: Strathcona West
Party	Candidate	Votes	%	±%
Progressive Conservative	Don Getty	6,764	48.39%	31.10%
Social Credit	Randolph McKinnon	5,153	36.87%	-10.60%
New Democratic	Frank Kuzemski	1,115	7.98%	-2.82%
Liberal	Edmund Leger	890	6.37%	-17.77%
Total		13,978	–	–
Rejected, spoiled and declined		56	–	–
Eligible electors / turnout		19,880	70.31%	–
Progressive Conservative gain from Social Credit		Swing		20.85%
Source(s) Source: "Strathcona West Official Results 1967 Alberta general election". Alberta Heritage Community Foundation.

1971 Alberta general election: Edmonton-Whitemud
Party	Candidate	Votes	%
Progressive Conservative	Don Getty	8,201	58.32%
Social Credit	Donald Hamilton	4,690	33.35%
New Democratic	Joseph Mercredi	936	6.66%
Liberal	Jim Tanner	235	1.67%
Total		14,062	–
Rejected, spoiled and declined		125	–
Eligible electors / turnout		17,279	82.11%
Source(s) Source: "Edmonton-Whitemud Official Results 1971 Alberta general election". Alberta Heritage Community Foundation.

1975 Alberta general election: Edmonton-Whitemud
Party	Candidate	Votes	%	±%
Progressive Conservative	Don Getty	9,614	67.75%	9.43%
New Democratic	Lila Fahlman	2,645	18.64%	11.98%
Social Credit	Phil Dickson	1,101	7.76%	-25.59%
Liberal	Dilys Andersen	830	5.85%	4.18%
Total		14,190	–	–
Rejected, spoiled and declined		20	–	–
Eligible electors / turnout		23,949	59.33%	–
Progressive Conservative hold		Swing		10.71%
Source(s) Source: "Edmonton-Whitemud Official Results 1975 Alberta general election". Alberta Heritage Community Foundation.

Alberta provincial by-election, December 11, 1985: Edmonton-Whitemud following the resignation of Robert Keith Alexander on November 5, 1985
Party	Candidate	Votes	%	±%
Progressive Conservative	Don Getty	5,955	60.15	1.10
New Democratic	Tony Higgins	2,100	21.21	−5.76
Representative	Dick Mather	800	8.08	–
Liberal	Eric Wolfman	637	6.43	2.06
Independent	Lucien Maynard	355	3.59	–
Heritage	Mike Pawlus	53	0.54	–
Total		9,900	–	–
Rejected, spoiled and declined		10	–	–
Eligible electors / turnout		30,082	32.94	–
Progressive Conservative hold		Swing		3.43
Source(s) Source: "Edmonton-Whitemud Official By-election Results". Elections Alberta. December 11, 1985.

1986 Alberta general election: Edmonton-Whitemud
Party	Candidate	Votes	%	±%
Progressive Conservative	Don Getty	7,436	57.76%	−2.39%
New Democratic	Tony Higgins	3,875	30.10%	8.89%
Liberal	Eric Wolfman	1,135	8.82%	2.39%
Representative	Bert Beinert	336	2.61%	−5.61%
Western Canada Concept	Walter Stack	92	0.71%	–
Total		12,874	–	–
Rejected, spoiled and declined		40	–	–
Eligible electors / turnout		23,348	55.31%	–
Progressive Conservative hold		Swing		−5.64%
Source(s) Source: "Edmonton-Whitemud Official Results 1986 Alberta general election". Alberta Heritage Community Foundation.

1989 Alberta general election: Edmonton-Whitemud
Party	Candidate	Votes	%	±%
Liberal	Percy Wickman	8,350	45.25%	36.43%
Progressive Conservative	Don Getty	8,005	43.38%	-14.38%
New Democratic	Nao Fernando	2,099	11.37%	-18.73%
Total		18,454	–	–
Rejected, spoiled and declined		42	–	–
Eligible electors / turnout		31,536	58.65%	–
Liberal gain from Progressive Conservative		Swing		25.41%
Source(s) Source: "Edmonton-Whitemud Official Results 1989 Alberta general election". Alberta Heritage Community Foundation.

Alberta provincial by-election, May 9, 1989: Stettler following the resignation of Brian C. Downey on April 8, 1989
Party	Candidate	Votes	%
Progressive Conservative	Don Getty	5,558	71.36
Liberal	Frank Pickering	1,598	20.52
New Democratic	Grant Bergman	633	8.13
Total		7,789	–
Rejected, spoiled and declined		15	–
Eligible electors / turnout		11,618	67.17
Source(s) Source: "Stettler Official By-election Results". Elections Alberta. May 9, 1989.

=== Party leadership contest ===
1985 Progressive Conservative Association of Alberta leadership election
Second ballot
Candidate	Votes	Percentage
Don Getty	1,061	56.2%
Julian Koziak	827	43.8%
First ballot
Candidate	Votes	Percentage
Don Getty	913	48.4%
Julian Koziak	545	28.9%
Ron Ghitter	428	22.7%

== Bibliography ==
- Perry, Sandra E.; Craig, Jessica J. (2006). The Mantle of Leadership : Premiers of the Northwest Territories and Alberta. Edmonton, Alberta: Legislative Assembly of Alberta. ISBN 0-9689217-2-8.
