= Ian McClelland =

Canadian politician

Member of House of Commons of Canada
- In office 1993–2000
- Preceded by: Jim Edwards
- Succeeded by: James Rajotte
- Constituency: Edmonton Southwest

Member of the Legislative Assembly of Alberta
- In office 12 March 2001 – 22 November 2004
- Preceded by: Percy Wickman
- Succeeded by: Rick Miller
- Constituency: Edmonton-Rutherford

Personal details
- Born: 22 June 1942 (age 83) Trail, British Columbia
- Party: Reform; Canadian Alliance; Progressive Conservative (Alberta)
- Profession: businessman

Ian G. McClelland (born 22 June 1942) is an Edmonton-based businessperson, who was a member of the House of Commons of Canada from 1993 to 2000, and a member of the Alberta Legislative Assembly from 2001 to 2004.

== History ==
=== Business ===
Ian McClelland graduated from the Northern Alberta Institute of Technology in 1965, as a member of the first graduating class in Photographic Technology. In 1975, he started Colorfast Corporation, which grew under his management and ownership to become the largest independent photofinisher in Western Canada. At its peak, the company had twenty seven retail outlets, three manufacturing facilities and serviced five hundred retail outlets in Western Canada. McClelland sold the business to an employee, when he stood as a candidate in the 1993 federal election. In 1992, McClelland was honoured as a "Distinguished Friend of the Institute" by the Northern Alberta Institute of Technology.

=== Federal politics ===
McClelland was elected in the Edmonton Southwest electoral district under the Reform Party in the 1993 and 1997 federal elections, thus serving in the 35th and 36th Canadian Parliaments. He served as a Deputy Speaker in the 36th Parliament, and was the first member of the Official Opposition to be so appointed while Reform held that status. In 2000, McClelland announced that he would not seek a third term, and did not stand for re-election in the 2000 federal election.

=== Alberta politics ===
In 2001, McClelland was elected to the Alberta Legislature in the Edmonton-Rutherford riding. In 2004, after serving his term in the 25th Alberta Legislative Assembly, McClelland was defeated in that riding by Liberal Rick Miller.

=== Later public service ===
==== Northlands ====
In December 2006, Ian McClelland was appointed as a Director of Northlands in Edmonton, being one of two directors representing the Government of Canada, as specified in the Articles of Association of Northlands. McClelland was cited in part as follows: "Through his careers in government and the photofinishing industry, Mr. McClelland has shown his dedication and commitment to serving the Province of Alberta." Northlands has operated as a non-profit organization in Edmonton since 1879, and is a principal organizer of events in the city, including the Edmonton Exhibition (Capital EX) and numerous trade shows.

==== As a marriage commissioner ====
Ian McClelland is also a licensed marriage commissioner who at his residence presided over the wedding of Canadian Member of Parliament Helena Guergis and former Canadian Member of Parliament Rahim Jaffer on 15 October 2008, immediately following the latter's electoral defeat.

== Archives ==
There is an Ian McClelland fonds at Library and Archives Canada. Archival reference number is R11198.
