= Mike Percy (politician) =

Canadian politician

MLA for Edmonton-Whitemud
- In office 1993–1997
- Preceded by: Percy Wickman
- Succeeded by: Dave Hancock

Personal details
- Born: Banff, Alberta
- Party: Alberta Liberal Party
- Spouse: Debby Carlson
- Occupation: academic

Michael B. Percy is an academic and former politician in Alberta, Canada.

Percy, an economics professor at the University of Alberta, was elected as an Alberta Liberal Party member in Edmonton-Whitemud after former MLA Percy Wickman switched to a new riding. Percy held the riding for one term, serving as Finance Critic until retiring from elected life in 1997. At that point, he was appointed as the Stanley A. Milner Professor and Dean of the Alberta School of Business at the University of Alberta, a position he held until July 1, 2011.

In 2019, Percy was named a member of the Blue Ribbon Panel on Alberta’s Finances by Alberta Premier Jason Kenney. The final report outlined 26 recommendations to improve Alberta's finances.

Percy is married to Debby Carlson who was also a Liberal member in the Legislative Assembly at that time.

Preceded by Percy Wickman	MLA Edmonton-Whitemud; 1993–1997	Succeeded by David Hancock
