= Neil Stanley Crawford =

Canadian politician and jazz musician

Member of the Legislative Assembly of Alberta
- In office August 30, 1971 – March 20, 1989
- Succeeded by: Doug Main
- Constituency: Edmonton-Parkallen

Personal details
- Born: May 26, 1931 Prince Albert, Saskatchewan, Canada
- Died: August 25, 1992 (aged 61) Edmonton, Alberta, Canada
- Party: Progressive Conservative Association of Alberta

Neil Stanley Crawford (May 26, 1931 – August 25, 1992) was a politician and jazz musician from Alberta, Canada.

== Early life ==
Neil Crawford was born in Prince Albert, Saskatchewan. He married Catherine May Hughes September 3, 1951, graduated from the University of Saskatchewan Law School in 1954, and practiced law in Edmonton, Alberta during the 1950s and 1960s, before becoming involved in politics. Crawford served as an Alderman for the city of Edmonton from 1966–1971.

== Federal involvement ==
Crawford was actively involved with federal politics. He served as an executive assistant to Prime Minister John Diefenbaker between 1961 and 1963, and served as Young Progressive Conservative Association President from 1963 to 1964.

He had a jazz band composed of provincial MLAs called the Tory Blue Notes, and played trumpet.

== Provincial politics ==
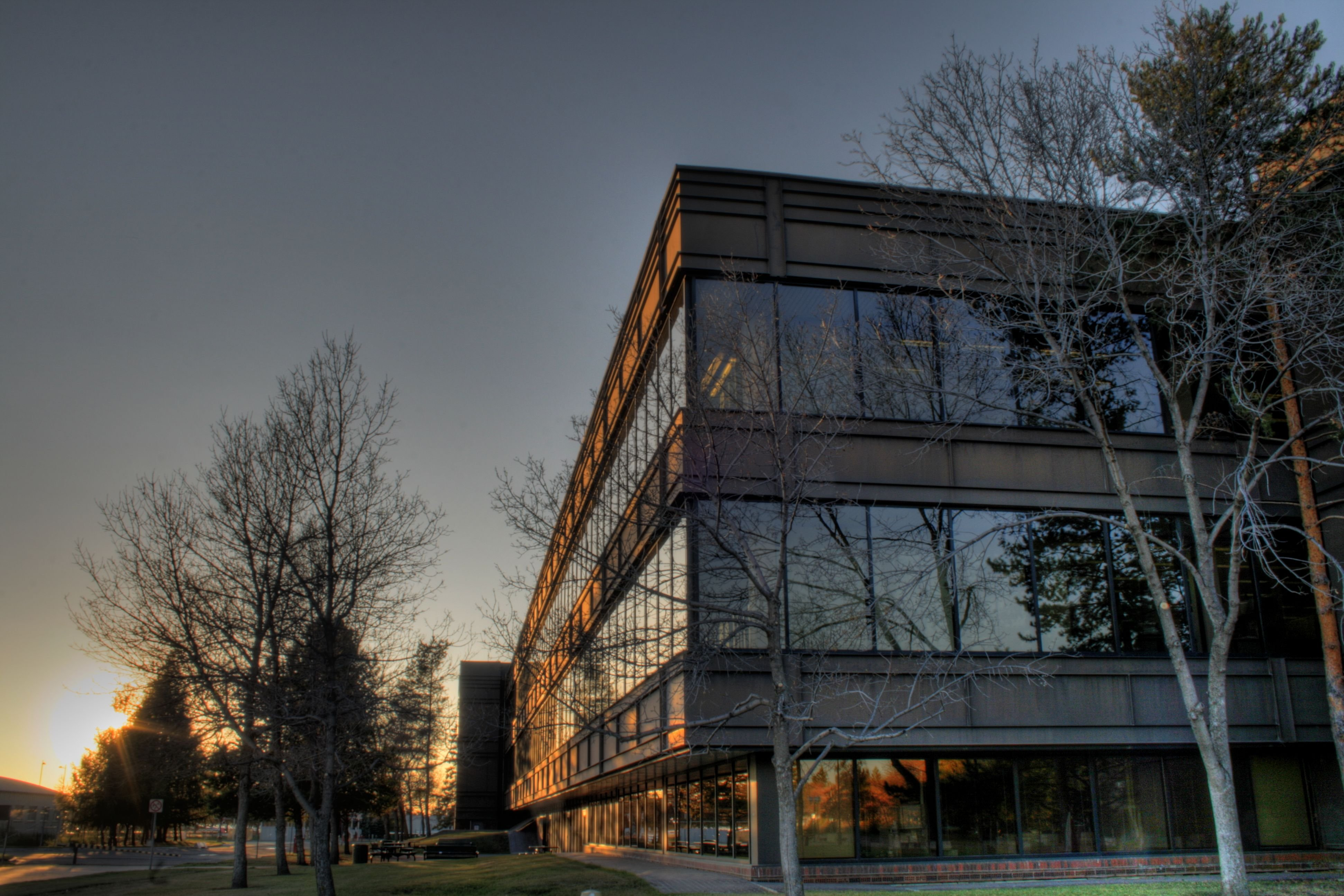
A building in the Neil Crawford Centre near the Parkallen neighborhood in south Edmonton.

Crawford was elected to the Legislative Assembly of Alberta for the first time in the 1971 Alberta general election for the new district of Edmonton-Parkallen. He served a total of five terms from 1971 to 1989 for the Progressive Conservatives.

During his time in the assembly he served numerous portfolios in the cabinet. He was Minister of Health and Social Development, Minister of Labour, Minister of Municipal Affairs, Attorney General, Government House Leader and lastly responsible for the government's Special Projects.

In December 1986 he held a press conference to announce he was afflicted with Lou Gehrig's disease (also known as ALS). He served out the rest of his term and retired in 1989.

He died on August 25, 1992, of ALS in Edmonton. The Neil Crawford Centre, a Government of Alberta office complex in south Edmonton, is named in his honour. The Edmonton subdivision of Crawford Plains, Edmonton, as well as the Crawford Plains Elementary School are also named for him.

Legislative Assembly of Alberta
Preceded by New District	MLA Edmonton-Parkallen; 1971–1989	Succeeded by Doug Main
