= Representative Party of Alberta =

Defunct provincial political party in Alberta

Representative Party
- Former provincial party
- Leader: Raymond Speaker
- Founded: 1982
- Dissolved: 1989
- Split from: Alberta Social Credit
- Ideology: Conservatism; Populism
- Political position: Right-wing

The Representative Party of Alberta (first registered as the Political Alternative Association, and known as the Alternative Government Movement prior to registration in 1984) was a provincial political party in Alberta, Canada, formed by former Alberta Social Credit Party parliamentary leader Raymond Speaker in 1984. It was a populist conservative party, and branded itself as a modern version of Social Credit without the social credit monetary reform policy.

== History ==
=== Foundation ===
On 31 March 1982, Speaker announced that Social Credit would sit out the upcoming provincial election due to a marked decline in support for the party. Social Credit had governed Alberta without interruption from 1935 to 1971. However, the party had won government mere months after its founding, and was ill-prepared for opposition. From 1975 onward, it never held more than four seats in the legislature.

The party disavowed Speaker's statement, and a motion to disband the party overwhelmingly failed. In response, soon after the writ was dropped for the election, Speaker and another longtime Alberta Social Credit Party Socred MLA, Walt Buck, left the party and ran as Independents. The two MLAs were successfully returned as Independents to the Legislative Assembly of Alberta. Meanwhile, Social Credit was only able to scrape together a slate of 23 candidates and was shut out of the legislature altogether.

After the election, Speaker and Buck tried to form the official opposition, over but were denied by the Speaker of the Assembly who gave the two-member Alberta New Democratic Party official opposition status.

After being denied party funding, Speaker and Buck floated the idea for a new political party in 1982. Plans for the new began taking root in the spring of 1984. Speaker and Buck began holding meetings across the province which they promoted under the name Alternate Government Movement. The party also hired Preston Manning as a political consultant to present draft policies at its founding meetings.

The founding convention for the party was held on 23 and 24 November in Red Deer. The party selected a board of directors and elected Ray Speaker as leader by acclamation. It also selected the name Representative Party of Alberta from four options. The other three options were United Party, Free Democratic Party and the Free Citizens Alliance Party. The paperwork submitted to Elections Alberta and petitions of registration that had started before the convention were under the Political Alternative Association name. The party planned to submit a request to change the name as soon as registration was accepted by Elections Alberta. On 7 January 1985 Elections Alberta accepted the petition after it collected the signatures of over 4500 Alberta electors.

=== Collapse of the Alberta Political Alliance ===
In 1985, the Social Credit Party, the Western Canada Concept and the Heritage Party of Alberta began a merger movement that resulted in the Alberta Alliance Political Association.

The merger was short-lived and broke apart, collapsing the parties involved. Many candidates and supporters moved to support the Representative Party which became the primary right-wing alternative party for that election.

=== 1986 provincial election ===
In the 1986 provincial election, the Representative Party ran 46 candidates in Alberta’s 83 ridings, but only its two founding MLAs were elected. The party received 36,656 votes, or 5.1% of the popular vote.

During the campaign, the Representative Party advocated for greater opposition in a chamber that had only four opposition MLAs (Speaker, Buck and two New Democrats). It also called for a balanced provincial budget.

=== The final years of the party ===
In January 1989 Speaker crossed the floor to the Alberta Progressive Conservative Party. He told his riding association that with new premier Don Getty agreeing to push for a balanced budget, there was no reason to continue in opposition. He also announced that with Buck retiring at the end of the term, the Representative Party would be wound up. The Representative Party remained registered but did not run candidates in the 1989 election. The party disbanded a short time later.

== See also ==
- Representative Party of Ontario
- List of Alberta political parties
