= The Heritage Party of Alberta =

Political party in Canada (1984–1987)

The Heritage Party of Alberta was a right-wing political party active in Politics of Canada during the 1980s. Throughout its existence, it was led by Mike Pawlus.

The party was founded in 1984 and officially recognized in January 1985; also in 1984, it began negotiations with other small right-wing parties in Alberta. The next year, they joined with Western Canada Concept and Alberta Social Credit Party to create the Alberta Political Alliance (later called Alberta Party), but left the coalition a year later to run independently once more, in a local 1986 election. The party ceased to exist in 1987.

== Elections contested ==
- Spirit River-Fairview by-election, February 21, 1985. Pawlus and The Heritage Party won 18 votes, finishing last out of 17 candidates
- Edmonton-Whitemud by-election, December 11, 1985. Again finished last, winning 53 votes for a vote share of 0.54%. The party claimed expenditures of C$4103.
- Edmonton-Mill Woods, 1986. Finished last in the field of five candidates, with 132 votes.
  - In the same election, the party fielded five other candidates earning 601 votes in total across the province.
