= Pam Barrett =

Canadian politician

Leader of the Alberta New Democratic Party
- In office September 8, 1996 – February 2, 2000
- Preceded by: Ross Harvey
- Succeeded by: Raj Pannu

Member of the Legislative Assembly of Alberta for Edmonton-Highlands
- In office March 11, 1997 – February 1, 2000
- Preceded by: Alice Hanson (Edmonton-Highlands-Beverly)
- Succeeded by: Brian Mason
- In office May 8, 1986 – June 15, 1993
- Preceded by: David Thomas King
- Succeeded by: Alice Hanson (Edmonton-Highlands-Beverly)

Personal details
- Born: Pamela T. Barrett; November 26, 1953 Brandon, Manitoba, Canada
- Died: January 21, 2008 (aged 54) Edmonton, Alberta, Canada
- Party: New Democratic

Pamela T. Barrett (November 26, 1953 – January 21, 2008) was a Canadian politician who sat in the Legislative Assembly of Alberta as a member of the New Democratic Party.

== Early political career ==
Barrett started working for the Alberta New Democratic Party as a researcher in the legislature office of Grant Notley. She also worked for the Alberta Federation of Labour.

Barrett ran in the 1986 Alberta general election and was elected in the riding of Edmonton-Highlands. She defeated incumbent David Thomas King, the Minister of Technology, Research, and Telecommunications, in what many regarded as a substantial upset. She, Marie Laing and a few others were identified in local newspapers as "giant-slayers" for un-seating Conservative cabinet minister/MLAs.

She was named to a prominent position in the NDP Official Opposition, which for the first time in that party's history was 16 MLAs strong. She served as the New Democrats' Deputy House Leader from 1986 to 1993, backing up caucus leader Ray Martin.

She retired from the legislature in 1993 owing to poor health resulting from job stress.

== Leader of Alberta New Democrats ==
Barrett came back to politics when she contested and won the Alberta NDP leadership in 1996 following the resignation of Ross Harvey. In the 1997 Alberta general election she ran and won in the re-drawn district of Edmonton-Highlands.

Under Barrett in the 1997 election, the New Democrats won two seats after having been shut out in the 1993 election. Her aggressive leadership style inspired observers to nickname her "Mighty Mouse."

== Near death experience ==
Barrett resigned the NDP leadership and her seat in 2000 after having what she claimed to be a near-death experience in a dentist's chair. After her retirement from politics she went on a "spiritual search". Her near death-experience was a subject of both serious and satiric attention in the Canadian media. She was parodied on the CBC Television show The Royal Canadian Air Farce and featured on the front cover of the May 2000 issue of lifestyle magazine Elm Street.

== Death ==
Barrett died on January 21, 2008, aged 54, at the Cross Cancer Institute in Edmonton, from oesophageal cancer, after battling the disease for at least two years.

Legislative Assembly of Alberta
Preceded by David Thomas King	MLA for Edmonton Highlands; 1986–1993; 1997–2000	Succeeded by Brian Mason
