= Blake Desjarlais =

Canadian politician (born 1993)

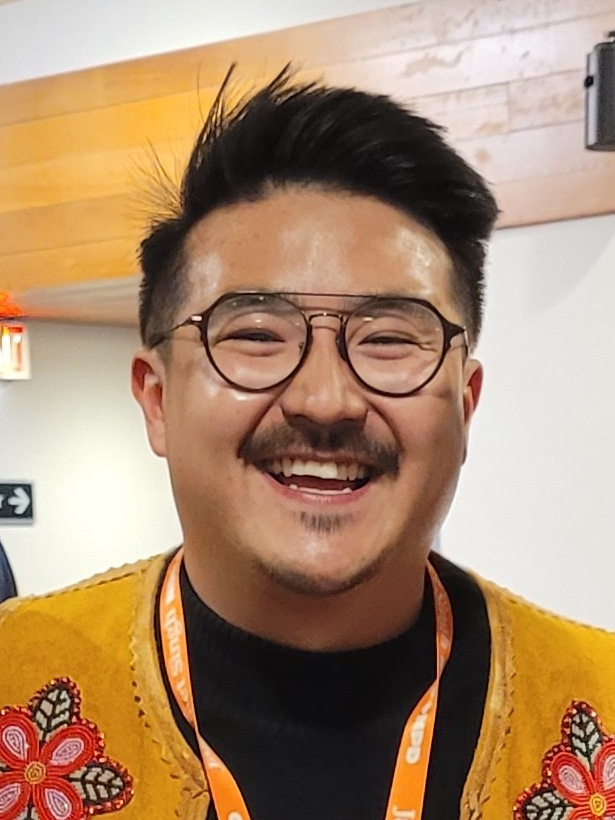
- Desjarlais in 2023

Member of Parliament for Edmonton Griesbach
- In office September 20, 2021 – April 28, 2025
- Preceded by: Kerry Diotte
- Succeeded by: Kerry Diotte

Chief of Staff to the Mayor of Edmonton
- In office April 2, 2026 – July 8, 2026
- Preceded by: Gabrielle Blatz (interim)

Personal details
- Born: December 29, 1993 (age 32) Edmonton, Alberta, Canada
- Party: New Democratic
- Education: MacEwan University (attended); University of Victoria

Blake Desjarlais (born December 29, 1993) is a Canadian politician who represented Edmonton Griesbach in the House of Commons from 2021 to 2025. A member of the New Democratic Party (NDP), Desjarlais is of Cree and Métis descent, making him Alberta's only Indigenous member of Parliament (MP). He is also the first openly two-spirit individual to serve as an MP.

== Early life and education ==
Desjarlais was born on December 29, 1993 in Edmonton and grew up in the Fishing Lake Métis Settlement in central Alberta. He is of Cree and Métis descent. His biological mother Brenda was a victim of the Sixties Scoop and spent her childhood in foster care, before working as a sex worker to support herself. When Brenda became pregnant with Blake, she sought help from her sister Grace Desjarlais, who took Blake and raised him herself. On his adoption by his aunt, Desjarlais stated that "she saved [his] life." Desjarlais's father was a carpenter who had died when Desjarlais was twelve.

Desjarlais attended secondary school in the "predominantly white town" of Elk Point, Alberta. He went on to study political science and Indigenous studies at MacEwan University; however, he received racially motivated death threats and transferred to the University of Victoria. As a university student, Desjarlais was involved in student politics, and served as firekeeper of the Native Student Union (NSU). When Desjarlais completed his studies, he was appointed the national director of the Métis Settlements General Council in 2016.

== Political career ==
=== 2021 campaign ===
Desjarlais had previously mulled running for an elected Indigenous leadership role. He was skeptical of running in partisan politics, seeing the various parties as only having interest in him to fulfill mandates regarding Indigenous and queer representation. Upon meeting representatives from the NDP, his impression was different, stating that "[The NDP] recognized me as a whole person with expertise in a vast variety of sectors."

During the 2021 election campaign, Desjarlais received support from several members of the Legislative Assembly (MLAs) – Janis Irwin, Chris Nielsen, former premier Rachel Notley and former education minister David Eggen. According to Desjarlais, during an evening canvassing shift, he had a racist interaction with five men who mistook him for being Chinese and blamed him for the COVID-19 pandemic.

=== Member of Parliament ===
On election day, Desjarlais defeated Kerry Diotte, a two-term Conservative MP. The riding was previously considered a Conservative stronghold. MLA Janis Irwin likened Desjarlais's win to a disinterest in the Liberal Party and anger directed towards the Conservative Party due to their actions federally – such as MP Diotte's vote against the conversion therapy ban – and their association with the unpopular United Conservative Party (UCP) government provincially. As well, growing support of the People's Party voters siphoned off support from the Conservatives.

Desjarlais is the first openly two-spirit individual to have been elected to Parliament.

After being elected, Desjarlais was selected to be the New Democratic Party's deputy caucus chair for the 44th Parliament.

Desjarlais was defeated in the 2025 federal election by Diotte.

=== Post-parliamentary career ===
On April 2, 2026, Andrew Knack, the Mayor of Edmonton, announced that Desjarlais would join his office as his chief of staff. Three months later on July 8, Desjarlais stepped down from the position.

== Electoral history ==
2025 Canadian federal election: Edmonton Griesbach
Party	Candidate	Votes	%	±%	Expenditures
Conservative	Kerry Diotte	22,256	45.45	+9.14	$104,512.29
New Democratic	Blake Desjarlais	16,717	34.14	–6.22	$133,835.80
Liberal	Patrick Lennox	8,973	18.32	+3.15	$29,883.76
People's	Thomas Matty	318	0.65	–5.29	none listed
Green	Michael Hunter	302	0.62	–0.51	none listed
Communist	Alex Boykowich	146	0.30	+0.03	none listed
Independent	Crystal Vargas	118	0.24	–	none listed
Canadian Future	Brent Tyson	72	0.15	–	$835.32
Marxist–Leninist	Mary Joyce	64	0.13	–0.12	none listed
Total valid votes/expense limit		48,966	99.10	–	$132,162.35
Total rejected ballots		446	0.90	–0.24	
Turnout		49,412	56.75	+3.43	
Eligible voters		87,071			
Conservative notional gain from New Democratic		Swing		+7.68	
Source: Elections Canada

2021 Canadian federal election: Edmonton Griesbach
Party	Candidate	Votes	%	±%	Expenditures
New Democratic	Blake Desjarlais	17,457	40.54	+15.41	$83,159.87
Conservative	Kerry Diotte	15,957	37.06	–14.30	$76,024.95
Liberal	Habiba Mohamud	5,979	13.89	–3.36	$62,467.37
People's	Thomas Matty	2,617	6.08	+3.79	$6,908.51
Green	Heather Lau	538	1.25	–1.28	none listed
Libertarian	Morgan Watson	268	0.62	–	none listed
Communist	Alex Boykowich	140	0.33	–0.03	none listed
Marxist–Leninist	Mary Joyce	103	0.24	+0.05	none listed
Total valid votes/expense limit		43,059	98.86	–	$111,212.30
Total rejected ballots		495	1.14	+0.47	
Turnout		43,554	53.32	–3.52	
Eligible voters		81,685			
New Democratic gain from Conservative		Swing		+14.86	
Source: Elections Canada
