= Ron Liepert =

Canadian politician (born 1949)

The Honourable Ron Liepert ECA

Member of Parliament for Calgary Signal Hill
- In office October 19, 2015 – March 23, 2025
- Preceded by: Riding Established
- Succeeded by: David McKenzie

Minister of Finance in Alberta
- In office October 12, 2011 – May 8, 2012
- Premier: Alison Redford
- Preceded by: Lloyd Snelgrove (Finance and Enterprise)
- Succeeded by: Doug Horner

Minister of Energy in Alberta
- In office January 15, 2010 – October 12, 2011
- Premier: Edward Stelmach
- Preceded by: Mel Knight
- Succeeded by: Ted Morton

Minister of Health and Wellness in Alberta
- In office March 12, 2008 – January 15, 2010
- Premier: Edward Stelmach
- Preceded by: Dave Hancock
- Succeeded by: Gene Zwozdesky

Minister of Education in Alberta
- In office December 15, 2006 – March 12, 2008
- Premier: Edward Stelmach
- Preceded by: Dave Hancock
- Succeeded by: Gene Zwozdesky

Member of the Legislative Assembly of Alberta for Calgary-West
- In office November 22, 2004 – April 23, 2012
- Preceded by: Karen Kryczka
- Succeeded by: Ken Hughes

Personal details
- Born: Ronald Liepert; October 8, 1949 (age 76) Saltcoats, Saskatchewan, Canada
- Party: Conservative Party (federal)
- Other political affiliations: United Conservative Party (provincial; 2017–); Progressive Conservative Association of Alberta (provincial; 1980–2017)
- Spouse: Linda
- Children: 2
- Occupation: Consultant
- Website: http://ronliepert.ca

Ronald Liepert ECA (born October 8, 1949) is a Canadian politician from Alberta who served as the Member of Parliament for Calgary Signal Hill in the House of Commons of Canada from 2015 until 2025. He previously served in the Cabinet of Alberta as Minister of Finance, Energy, Health and Wellness and Education under premiers Ed Stelmach and Alison Redford. From 2004 to 2012, he was a Member of the Legislative Assembly of Alberta, representing the constituency of Calgary-West, as a Progressive Conservative legislator. On April 12, 2014, Liepert won the federal Conservative nomination in Calgary Signal Hill, defeating incumbent Rob Anders, and was elected to parliament in 2015. He was re-elected in 2019 and 2021.

== Early life ==
Liepert was born in Saltcoats, Saskatchewan in 1949. He grew up on his family's farm and attended a small rural school. He left high school in the middle of grade 11 at the age of 17. He moved to Alberta, where he took a job in Calgary with Rosco Steel. For three years Liepert returned to the family farm to help with the crop, but he became disillusioned with farming and he moved to Calgary permanently. He was working at Burns Foods in 1971 when he decided to enroll in the Columbia School of Broadcasting. In 1972, Liepert, married and with an infant daughter, joined CHAB (AM) in Moose Jaw. In the mid-1970s he took a position with CFCW (AM) radio in Camrose, Alberta. In the late 1970s, he moved to the ITV network in Edmonton.

From 1980 to 1985, Liepert held the position of Press Secretary to Premier Peter Lougheed. He served as a key aide to Lougheed during interprovincial negotiations on energy policy and the Constitutional Accord of 1982. He also participated in several federal–provincial conferences. Following that responsibility, he moved to the Ministry of Economic Development as the Trade Director of Western U.S. Operations. In 1991, he moved to the private sector to work for Telus where he was involved in both the purchase of Ed Tel and the BCTel merger in addition to the rebranding of AGT to Telus. From 2000 to 2004, Liepart owned his own public relations/communications consulting company and operated a childcare centre in Downtown Calgary.

== Member of the Legislative Assembly ==
Liepert first ran for a seat to the Alberta Legislature as a Progressive Conservative candidate in the electoral district of Edmonton-Highlands-Beverly in the 1993 Alberta general election. He finished third in the five-way race behind the winning candidate, Liberal Alice Hanson, and incumbent New Democrat John McInnis.

After his private sector experience, Liepert decided to return to politics in the 2004 provincial election in the constituency of Calgary-West. In that election, Liepert received 52% of the vote. During his first two years as an MLA, he served as the chair of the Alberta Heritage Savings Trust Fund Committee, a co-chair for the Film Advisory Council, and a member of a team that conducted a special review of the Local Authority Elections Act.

Following the 2006 leadership race for the Progressive Conservative Association of Alberta, newly elected Premier Ed Stelmach appointed Liepert to be the Minister of Education. During his tenure as Education Minister, he also served as a member of the Cabinet Policy Committee on Community Services. In the 2008 provincial election, Liepert was reelected with 48% of the vote and appointed by the Premier as the Minister of Health and Wellness. In addition to his ministerial responsibilities, Liepert also served as a member of the Privileges and Elections, Standing Orders and Printing Committee.

As the Health Minister, Liepert dismantled the nine health regions of Alberta in favour of an Alberta Health Services "super" Board. In existence for five months and running a $1.3-billion deficit, they voted themselves, with Liepert's approval, a 25% raise.

He faced criticism over the handling of the flu immunization campaign for the 2009 flu pandemic.

On January 15, 2010, Liepert was sworn in as Minister of Energy.

== Member of Parliament ==
On April 12, 2014, Liepert won the federal Conservative nomination in Calgary Signal Hill, defeating incumbent Rob Anders. Anders had been the MP for Calgary West, an abolished constituency whose territory was reassigned mostly to Signal Hill, since 1997.

On September 21, 2015, Liepert drew criticism from the left-wing Broadbent Institute newsletter Press Progress for his position on civil liberties and Bill C-51. During an all-candidates debate, he said, "I know there's a whole group of people … who talk about civil liberties and about the freedom of having the right to pretty much choose to do what you like. Folks, that's not the country we live in … I'm fully in favour of Bill C-51."

On October 19, 2015, Liepert was elected MP for Calgary Signal Hill, winning with more than 60% of the vote.

During the 42nd Canadian Parliament, Liepert introduced one private member's bill, numbered C-229 and entitled the "Life Means Life Act", which proposed to mandate that persons found guilty of certain crimes, such as murder or treason, be sentenced to life imprisonment without eligibility for parole. The bill was defeated in a vote in September 2016 with only Conservative Party members voting in support. Then Justice Minister Peter MacKay had previously introduced this bill in the 41st Parliament in March 2015, as Bill C-53, though it was not adopted before the parliament ended.

In January 2021, it was revealed that Liepert had travelled to California twice during the COVID-19 pandemic, though the Canada–United States border was closed to all nonessential travel and public health orders urged people to avoid unnecessary travel. Liepert claimed the trips were for essential house maintenance to his Palm Desert home.

On February 17, 2023, Liepert announced that he would not run in the next federal election after finishing his service in the 44th Canadian Parliament.

== Personal life ==
Liepert and his wife, Linda, have two adult children; one is deceased. He enjoys golfing and served as a board member at the Pinebrook Golf Club in Calgary. Liepert has coordinated various charitable affairs, such as celebrity sport dinners and several fundraising campaigns and benefits. He also volunteers his time at a variety of other community events.

== Electoral record ==
=== Federal ===
2021 Canadian federal election: Calgary Signal Hill
Party	Candidate	Votes	%	±%	Expenditures
Conservative	Ron Liepert	35,217	58.98	–11.00	$49,810.65
Liberal	Shawn Duncan	11,106	18.60	+3.28	$14,789.42
New Democratic	Patrick King	8,863	14.84	+6.40	none listed
People's	Nick Debrey	2,859	4.79	+3.01	$8,787.91
Green	Keiran Corrigall	1,094	1.83	–1.54	none listed
Maverick	Ajay Copp	568	0.95	–	$7,220.21
Total valid votes/expense limit		59,707	99.45	–	$117,837.82
Total rejected ballots		332	0.55	+0.17	
Turnout		60,039	67.44	–4.40	
Eligible voters		89,020			
Conservative hold		Swing		–7.14	
Source: Elections Canada

2019 Canadian federal election: Calgary Signal Hill
Party	Candidate	Votes	%	±%	Expenditures
Conservative	Ron Liepert	44,421	69.98	+9.43	$50,605.41
Liberal	Ghada Alatrash	9,722	15.32	–15.24	$18,668.44
New Democratic	Khalis Ahmed	5,355	8.44	+3.44	$145.93
Green	Marco Reid	2,139	3.37	+0.83	$1,743.75
People's	Gord Squire	1,130	1.78	–	none listed
Rhinoceros	Christina Bassett	511	0.81	–	$977.40
Christian Heritage	Garry Dirk	200	0.32	+0.06	$7,255.71
Total valid votes/expense limit		63,478	99.62	–	$113,915.78
Total rejected ballots		241	0.38	+0.08	
Turnout		63,719	71.84	–1.48	
Eligible voters		88,690			
Conservative hold		Swing		+12.34	
Source: Elections Canada

2015 Canadian federal election: Calgary Signal Hill
Party	Candidate	Votes	%	±%	Expenditures
Conservative	Ron Liepert	37,858	60.55	–4.33	$130,725.18
Liberal	Kerry Cundal	19,108	30.56	+15.12	$45,722.45
New Democratic	Khalis Ahmed	3,128	5.00	–5.58	$20,771.13
Green	Taryn Knorren	1,586	2.54	–6.24	$3,474.13
Libertarian	Tim Moen	679	1.09	–	$41,422.27
Christian Heritage	Jesse Rau	160	0.26	–	$5,538.70
Total valid votes/expense limit		62,519	99.70	–	$222,240.38
Total rejected ballots		189	0.30	–	
Turnout		62,708	73.32	–	
Eligible voters		85,530			
Conservative hold		Swing		–9.74	
Source: Elections Canada

=== Provincial ===
2008 Alberta general election results		Turnout 39.78%		Swing	
Affiliation	Candidate	Votes	%	Party	Personal
Progressive Conservative	Ron Liepert	8,428	47.97%	-4.11%	
Liberal	Beth Gignac	5,693	32.41%	0.39%	
Wildrose Alliance	Bob Babcock	2,273	12.94%	5.55%	
Green	James Kohut	773	4.40%	-1.06%	
New Democratic	Chantelle Dubois	401	2.28%	-0.77%	
Total		17,568			
Rejected, spoiled and declined		58			
Eligible electors / Turnout		44,306	%		
Progressive Conservative hold		Swing		-2.25%	

2004 Alberta general election results		Turnout 42.38%		Swing	
Affiliation	Candidate	Votes	%	Party	Personal
Progressive Conservative	Ron Liepert	6,969	52.08%	-21.07%	
Liberal	Derek Smith	4,284	32.02%	12.35%	
Alberta Alliance	John Keyes	989	7.39%		
Green	James Kohut	731	5.46%	*	
New Democratic	Chantelle Dubois	408	3.05%	-4.13%	
Total		13,381			
Rejected, spoiled and declined		70			
Eligible electors / Turnout		31,736	%		
Progressive Conservative hold		Swing		-16.71%	

1993 Alberta general election: Edmonton-Highlands-Beverly
Party	Candidate	Votes	%	±%
Liberal	Alice Hanson	5,189	45.59%	+27.17%
Progressive Conservative	Ron Liepert	2,787	24.48%	-2.10%
New Democratic	John McInnis	2,885	25.34%	-29.66%
Social Credit	Tim Friesen	428	3.76%	–
Natural Law	Cliff Kinzel	94	0.83%	–
Total		11,383	–	–
Rejected, spoiled, and declined		31	–	–
Eligible electors / turnout		20,798	54.88%	+1.14%
Liberal notional gain from New Democratic		Swing		+14.63%
Source(s) "Results for Edmonton-Highlands". Heritage Community Foundation. Swing is calculated from the Edmonton-Highlands result in 1989.

Alberta provincial government of Alison Redford
Cabinet post (1)
Predecessor	Office	Successor
Iris Evans	Minister of Finance; October 12, 2011–May 8, 2012	Doug Horner
Alberta provincial government of Ed Stelmach
Cabinet posts (3)
Predecessor	Office	Successor
Mel Knight	Minister of Energy; January 15, 2010–October 12, 2011	Ted Morton
Dave Hancock	Minister of Health and Wellness; March 12, 2008–January 15, 2010	Gene Zwozdesky
Gene Zwozdesky	Minister of Education; December 15, 2006–March 12, 2008	Dave Hancock
