= John McInnis (Alberta politician) =

Canadian politician

Member of the Legislative Assembly of Alberta
- In office March 20, 1989 – June 15, 1993
- Preceded by: Leslie Young
- Succeeded by: District Abolished
- Constituency: Edmonton-Jasper Place

Personal details
- Born: October 19, 1950 Jasper Place, Alberta
- Died: November 26, 2003 (aged 53) Vancouver, British Columbia
- Party: Alberta New Democrats

John Robert Lawrence McInnis (October 19, 1950 – November 26, 2003) was a provincial level politician from Alberta, Canada. He served as a member of the Legislative Assembly of Alberta from 1989 to 1993.

== Political career ==
McInnis ran for a seat in the Alberta Legislature for the electoral district of Edmonton-Jasper Place in the 1989 Alberta general election. He defeated Incumbent Progressive Conservative MLA Leslie Young and Liberal candidate Karen Leibovici to pick the seat for the Alberta New Democrats. The race was a virtual three-way tie with a margin 463 votes separating first and third place. After the election he was appointed to serve on the Member Services', Public Affairs and Special Committee on Constitutional Reform.

The Edmonton-Jasper Place electoral district was abolished due to redistribution in 1993. McInnis ran for re-election in the new electoral district of Edmonton-Highlands-Beverly. He was defeated by Liberal candidate Alice Hanson and he finished just ahead of future Progressive Conservative MLA Ron Liepert. McInnis died of an apparent heart attack on November 26, 2003.
