= Edmonton-Highlands =

Defunct provincial electoral district in Alberta, Canada

Alberta electoral district

Defunct provincial electoral district
- Legislature: Legislative Assembly of Alberta
- District created: 1971
- District abolished: 1993
- District re-created: 1997
- District re-abolished: 2004
- First contested: 1971
- Last contested: 2001

Edmonton-Highlands was a provincial electoral district in Alberta, Canada, mandated to return a single member to the Legislative Assembly of Alberta using the first past the post method of voting from 1971 to 1993 and again from 1997 to 2004.

== History ==
Members for Edmonton-Highlands
Assembly	Years	Member	Party
See Edmonton North East 1959–1971
17th	1971–1975	David King	Progressive; Conservative
18th	1975–1979	David King	Progressive; Conservative
19th	1979–1982	David King	Progressive; Conservative
20th	1982–1986	David King	Progressive; Conservative
21st	1986–1989	Pam Barrett	New Democratic
22nd	1989–1993	Pam Barrett	New Democratic
See Edmonton-Highlands-Beverly 1993–1997
24th	1997–2000	Pam Barrett	New Democratic
24th	2000	Vacant	
24th	2000–2001	Brian Mason	New Democratic
25th	2001–2004	Brian Mason	New Democratic
See Edmonton-Highlands-Norwood 2004–

=== Representation history ===
The district's first representative was PC David Thomas King. He served in the cabinet of Peter Lougheed, most notably as Education minister from 1979 until 1986.

King was defeated by New Democrat Pam Barrett in the 1986 election. She served two terms as MLA, and took a break from politics due to poor health at the same time the riding was dissolved in 1993.

However, another quick redistribution saw the riding re-created in 1997, and Barrett (now leader of the NDP) captured the riding again. She subsequently resigned her seat in 2000 after a near-death experience.

Brian Mason won the resulting by-election, and was re-elected in 2001. When the riding was abolished again in 2004, he went on to serve as MLA for Edmonton-Highlands-Norwood.

== Election results ==
=== 1970s ===
1971 Alberta general election
Party	Candidate	Votes	%
Progressive Conservative	David Thomas King	2,848	40.01
Social Credit	Ambrose Holowach	2,748	38.61
New Democratic	Leroy Pearch	1,368	19.22
Liberal	Gerald Lorente	154	2.16
Total		7,118	100.00
Rejected, spoiled, and declined		105	
Eligible electors / Turnout		11,695	61.76
Progressive Conservative pickup new district.			

1975 Alberta general election
Party	Candidate	Votes	%	±%
Progressive Conservative	David Thomas King	3,085	59.51	+19.50
New Democratic	Muriel Venne	1,129	21.78	+2.56
Social Credit	Ambrose Holowach	888	17.13	-21.48
Communist	Bill Tuomi	82	1.58	
Total		5,184	100.00	
Rejected, spoiled, and declined		75		
Eligible electors / Turnout		10,896	48.27	-13.50
Progressive Conservative hold		Swing		+8.47

1979 Alberta general election
Party	Candidate	Votes	%	±%
Progressive Conservative	David Thomas King	4,644	56.48	-3.03
New Democratic	Clifford Gladue	2,065	25.12	+3.34
Social Credit	Sam Motrich	770	9.37	-7.76
Liberal	Ted Power	594	7.22	
Communist	William Tuomi	84	1.02	-0.56
Independent	Roger Lavoie	65	0.79	
Total		8,222	100.00	
Rejected, spoiled, and declined		29		
Eligible electors / Turnout		15,968	51.67	+3.41
Progressive Conservative hold		Swing		-3.18

=== 1980s ===
1982 Alberta general election
Party	Candidate	Votes	%	±%
Progressive Conservative	David Thomas King	5,157	54.65	-1.84
New Democratic	Marilyn Burnett	3,493	37.01	+11.90
Western Canada Concept	Dave Maetche	721	7.64	
Communist	Naomi Rankin	66	0.70	-0.32
Total		9,437	100.00	
Rejected, spoiled, and declined		50		
Eligible electors / Turnout		16,030	59.18	+7.51
Progressive Conservative hold		Swing		-6.87

1986 Alberta general election
Party	Candidate	Votes	%	±%
New Democratic	Pam Barrett	4,159	50.43	+13.42
Progressive Conservative	David Thomas King	3,507	42.52	-12.12
Liberal	Naseer Chaudhary	417	5.06	
Representative	Todd R.C. Ross	83	1.01	
Communist	Naomi Rankin	51	0.62	-0.08
Heritage Party	Cec Garfin	30	0.36	
Total		8,247	100.00	
Rejected, spoiled, and declined		30		
Eligible electors / Turnout		16,290	50.81	-8.37
New Democratic gain from Progressive Conservative		Swing		+12.77

1989 Alberta general election
Party	Candidate	Votes	%	±%
New Democratic	Pam Barrett	4,997	55.00	+4.57
Progressive Conservative	Ziad N. Jaber	2,415	26.58	-15.94
Liberal	Ken Kozak	1,673	18.41	+13.36
Total		9,085	100.00	
Rejected, spoiled, and declined		-232		
Eligible electors / Turnout		16,474	53.74	+2.93
New Democratic hold		Swing		+10.26

=== 1990s ===
Results for 1997 are compared to results in Edmonton-Highlands-Beverly in 1993.

1997 Alberta general election
Party	Candidate	Votes	%	±%
New Democratic	Pam Barrett	5,638	50.64	+25.29
Progressive Conservative	Jim Campbell	2,793	25.09	+0.60
Liberal	Chris Smith	2,284	20.51	-25.07
Social Credit	Tim Friesen	419	3.76	0.00
Total		11,134	100.00	
Rejected, spoiled, and declined		56		
Eligible electors / Turnout		18,930	59.11	+4.23
New Democratic notional gain from Liberal		Swing		+12.35

=== 2000s ===
Alberta provincial by-election, Monday, June 12, 2000 following the resignation of Ms. Pamela Barrett on February 2, 2000
Party	Candidate	Votes	%	±%
New Democratic	Brian Mason	4,863	59.04	+8.40
Liberal	Terry Kirkland	1,508	18.31	-2.21
Progressive Conservative	Barbara Fung	1,406	17.07	-8.02
Alberta First	John Reil	270	3.28	–
Social Credit	Pat Hansard	156	1.89	-1.87
Independent	Adil Pirbhai	34	0.41	–
Total		8,237	100.00	–
Rejected, spoiled, and declined		28	–	–
Eligible electors / turnout		19,714	41.92	-17.19
New Democratic hold		Swing		+5.30
Source(s) Alberta. Chief Electoral Officer (2000). The Report of the Chief Electoral Officer on the Edmonton-Highlands By-election held June 12, 2000 and the Red Deer-North By-election held September 25, 2000 (PDF) (Report). Edmonton: Legislative Assembly of Alberta; Chief Electoral Officer.

2001 Alberta general election
Party	Candidate	Votes	%	±%
New Democratic	Brian Mason	4,641	46.23	-12.81
Progressive Conservative	Robert Bilida	3,477	34.63	+17.57
Liberal	Kim Cassady	1,921	19.14	+0.83
Total		10,039	100.00	–
Rejected, spoiled, and declined		35	–	–
Eligible electors / turnout		21,539	46.77	+4.85
New Democratic hold		Swing		-15.19
Source(s) "Results for Edmonton-Highlands". Heritage Community Foundation.

== See also ==
- List of Alberta provincial electoral districts
- Canadian provincial electoral districts
