= Kerry Diotte =

Canadian politician (born 1956)

Kerry Diotte MP
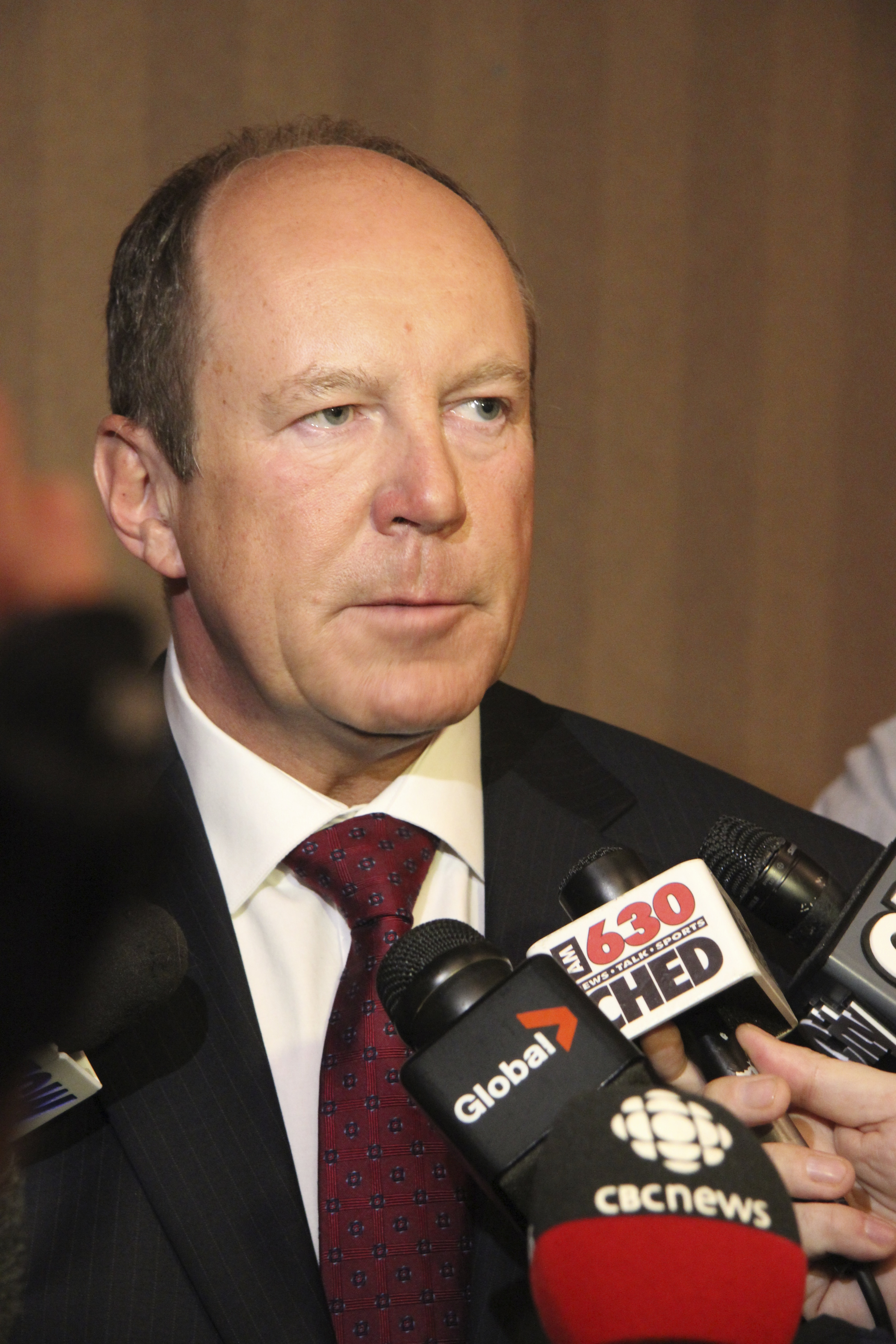
- Diotte in 2013

Member of Parliament for Edmonton Griesbach
- Incumbent
- Assumed office April 28, 2025
- Preceded by: Blake Desjarlais
- In office October 19, 2015 – September 20, 2021
- Preceded by: Riding established
- Succeeded by: Blake Desjarlais

Edmonton City Councillor for the 11th Ward
- In office October 26, 2010 – October 29, 2013
- Preceded by: Ward established
- Succeeded by: Mike Nickel

Personal details
- Born: Kerry Thomas Diotte; February 26, 1956 (age 70) Sault Ste. Marie, Ontario, Canada
- Party: Conservative
- Education: Carleton University
- Occupation: Journalist

Kerry Thomas Diotte MP (born 1956) is a Canadian politician and media personality who serves as member of Parliament (MP) for Edmonton Griesbach in the House of Commons of Canada and sat on the Edmonton City Council from 2010 to 2013. A Conservative, Diotte was elected twice–in the 2015 and 2019 elections–but lost his seat to New Democratic Party (NDP) candidate Blake Desjarlais in 2021. Diotte defeated incumbent MP Blake Desjarlais in the 2025 Canadian federal election. He ran for mayor of Edmonton in 2013, placing third. In June 2022 he joined Rebel News to become their Alberta Legislature reporter and political correspondent.

== Early life and career ==
Diotte was born in Sault Ste. Marie, Ontario, on February 26, 1956. He was educated at Carleton University in Ottawa, Ontario.

Diotte was employed at the Edmonton Sun from 1985 until October 2009 where he worked as Legislature bureau chief, as well as a copy editor, reporter, and assignment editor. Prior to that, he worked for the Calgary Sun and newsmagazines, including Alberta Report and Maclean's. He has also worked for a Canadian Broadcasting Corporation affiliate where he was an on-camera television reporter. For many years, Diotte was president of the Edmonton chapter of the Canadian Association of Journalists and a national director of the organization. He resigned those positions to campaign for a city council seat in the 2010 Edmonton municipal election.

=== 2004 police sting ===
On November 18, 2004, seven members of the Edmonton Police Service targeted Diotte along with then-police commission chairman Martin Ignasiak in a controversial undercover drunk-driving operation at an Edmonton bar, the Overtime Broiler & Taproom. Police were staked out in anticipation of catching the two men driving home drunk, but both took cabs home.

Subsequent legal proceedings produced evidence, including police radio conversations from that night, showing officers set up the operation because they were upset by Diotte's newspaper columns about policing, including criticism of photo radar operations. After an internal police investigation exonerated the officers involved in the unwarranted would-be sting, then-police chief Fred Rayner was fired from his position by the Edmonton Police Commission.

In September 2008, Alberta's Law Enforcement Review Board ruled a senior police officer abused his power by targeting Diotte because the law enforcement official was frustrated by the columnist's viewpoints on police matters. The panel decided there was "no credible evidence" to suggest Diotte would drive drunk when leaving the November 18, 2004 function and noted the journalist has no criminal record. In the decision, the panel chair wrote: "Mr. Diotte had the right, without fear of police reprisal, to freedom of speech, which includes the freedom to write critical articles about policing in his community."

== Political career ==
=== Municipal politics ===
Diotte ran for city council in the 2010 Edmonton municipal election, winning Ward 11 with 44.3% of the vote. On May 16, 2013, Diotte announced his candidacy for the mayoralty of Edmonton. He finished in third with 32,917 votes.

=== Member of Parliament ===
On February 26, 2014, Diotte announced his intention to seek the Conservative Party of Canada nomination in the new federal riding of Edmonton Griesbach. Diotte won the nomination election on December 6, 2014. In the 2015 election, Diotte won the seat, defeating his closest opponent, Janis Irwin, by 2,848 votes.

On September 15, 2016, he was appointed deputy critic of Urban Affairs in Interim Conservative leader Rona Ambrose's shadow cabinet.

Diotte was a member of the Standing Joint Committee for the Scrutiny of Regulations in the 42nd Parliament.

He was appointed in September 2018 as a member of the Standing Committee on Human Resources, Skills and Social Development and the Status of Persons with Disabilities.

Diotte sponsored private member's Bill C-306, An Act to establish a Crimean Tatar Deportation ("Sürgünlik") Memorial Day and to recognize the mass deportation of the Crimean Tatars in 1944 as an act of genocide. This bill sought to recognize the mass deportations of Crimean Tatars in 1944 by the Soviet Union as genocide and establish May 18 as a day of commemoration. Bill C-306 was defeated at second reading.

Diotte was appointed Deputy Shadow Minister for Public Services and Procurement in Opposition Leader Andrew Scheer's shadow cabinet.

On February 6, 2020, Diotte voted in support of Bill C-233 – an act to amend the Criminal Code (sex-selective abortion), which would make it an indictable or a summary offence for a medical practitioner to knowingly perform an abortion solely on the grounds of the child's genetic sex.

On October 28, 2020, Diotte voted in favour of Bill C-6 in the second reading, which proposed amending the Criminal Code to include a ban on conversion therapy. However, on June 21, 2021, he voted against the bill during the third reading, expressing concerns that the legislation wasn't worded precisely enough to exclude certain conversations in religious counselling. After losing his seat in the 2021 Canadian federal election, the amendment passed in the first session of the next Parliament in Bill C-4.

Diotte lost his Edmonton-Griesbach seat to the NDP's Blake Desjarlais in the 2021 federal election. In June 2022, he joined Rebel News to become their Alberta Legislature reporter and political correspondent until he regained his seat in the 2025 federal election.

=== Controversy ===
On November 19, 2018, Diotte launched a lawsuit against University of Alberta student publication The Gateway for publishing two articles that the suit deemed "defamatory", objecting to claims that he is racist. The Gateway issued a quick apology and retraction, stating: "That characterization of Mr. Diotte is false, damaging to his reputation, and caused Mr. Diotte and his family unwarranted embarrassment. The Gateway sincerely apologizes to Mr. Diotte for this wrongful characterization and retracts the offending articles." In a statement, Diotte stated that he was “glad that my lawyer and theirs could come to a mutually agreeable solution without a protracted court fight,” and that he was “a strong believer in free speech, but it’s important to remember there are legal lines that can’t be crossed.” On July 24, 2019, the Progress Report republished the story with the hope of triggering a SLAPP lawsuit. The podcast episode titled "Sue us Bitch" detailing this story still remains online.

== Electoral history ==
2025 Canadian federal election: Edmonton Griesbach
Party	Candidate	Votes	%	±%	Expenditures
Conservative	Kerry Diotte	22,256	45.45	+9.14	$104,512.29
New Democratic	Blake Desjarlais	16,717	34.14	–6.22	$133,835.80
Liberal	Patrick Lennox	8,973	18.32	+3.15	$29,883.76
People's	Thomas Matty	318	0.65	–5.29	none listed
Green	Michael Hunter	302	0.62	–0.51	none listed
Communist	Alex Boykowich	146	0.30	+0.03	none listed
Independent	Crystal Vargas	118	0.24	–	none listed
Canadian Future	Brent Tyson	72	0.15	–	$835.32
Marxist–Leninist	Mary Joyce	64	0.13	–0.12	none listed
Total valid votes/expense limit		48,966	99.10	–	$132,162.35
Total rejected ballots		446	0.90	–0.24	
Turnout		49,412	56.75	+3.43	
Eligible voters		87,071			
Conservative notional gain from New Democratic		Swing		+7.68	
Source: Elections Canada

2021 Canadian federal election: Edmonton Griesbach
Party	Candidate	Votes	%	±%	Expenditures
New Democratic	Blake Desjarlais	17,457	40.54	+15.41	$83,159.87
Conservative	Kerry Diotte	15,957	37.06	–14.30	$76,024.95
Liberal	Habiba Mohamud	5,979	13.89	–3.36	$62,467.37
People's	Thomas Matty	2,617	6.08	+3.79	$6,908.51
Green	Heather Lau	538	1.25	–1.28	none listed
Libertarian	Morgan Watson	268	0.62	–	none listed
Communist	Alex Boykowich	140	0.33	–0.03	none listed
Marxist–Leninist	Mary Joyce	103	0.24	+0.05	none listed
Total valid votes/expense limit		43,059	98.86	–	$111,212.30
Total rejected ballots		495	1.14	+0.47	
Turnout		43,554	53.32	–3.52	
Eligible voters		81,685			
New Democratic gain from Conservative		Swing		+14.86	
Source: Elections Canada

2019 Canadian federal election: Edmonton Griesbach
Party	Candidate	Votes	%	±%	Expenditures
Conservative	Kerry Diotte	24,120	51.36	+11.40	$74,918.60
New Democratic	Mark Cherrington	11,800	25.13	–8.89	$46,886.64
Liberal	Habiba Mohamud	8,100	17.25	–4.44	$66,800.39
Green	Safi Khan	1,189	2.53	+0.18	$1,016.70
People's	Barbara Ellen Nichols	1,074	2.29	–	$2,912.29
Independent	Andrzej Gudanowski	216	0.46	–	none listed
Christian Heritage	Christine Alva Armas	203	0.43	–	$971.25
Communist	Alex Boykowich	170	0.36	–	$476.56
Marxist–Leninist	Mary Joyce	91	0.19	–0.04	none listed
Total valid votes/expense limit		46,963	99.33	–	$109,301.88
Total rejected ballots		319	0.67	+0.07	
Turnout		47,282	56.84	–2.25	
Eligible voters		83,188			
Conservative hold		Swing		+10.15	
Source: Elections Canada

2015 Canadian federal election: Edmonton Griesbach
Party	Candidate	Votes	%	±%	Expenditures
Conservative	Kerry Diotte	19,157	39.96	–12.55	$93,048.30
New Democratic	Janis Irwin	16,309	34.02	–3.45	$150,799.22
Liberal	Brian Gold	10,397	21.69	+15.11	$14,575.14
Green	Heather Workman	1,129	2.35	–1.08	$1,404.61
Libertarian	Maryna Goncharenko	415	0.87	–	$150.44
Marijuana	Linda Northcott	279	0.58	–	none listed
Rhinoceros	Bun Bun Thompson	144	0.30	–	none listed
Marxist–Leninist	Mary Joyce	112	0.23	–	none listed
Total valid votes/expense limit		47,942	99.40	–	$214,842.90
Total rejected ballots		289	0.60	–	
Turnout		48,231	59.09	–	
Eligible voters		81,625			
Conservative hold		Swing		–4.55	
Source: Elections Canada

2013 Edmonton mayoral election
Candidate	Votes	%
Don Iveson	132,162	62.2
Karen Leibovici	41,182	19.4
Kerry Diotte	32,917	15.5
Joshua Semotiuk	2,596	1.2
Gordon Ward	2,248	1.1
Kristine Acielo	1,292	0.6

2010 Edmonton Ward 11 election
Candidate	Votes	%
Kerry Diotte	7,341	44.2
Chinwe Okelu	4,728	28.5
Brent Schaffrick	1,783	10.7
Shane Bergdahl	1,427	8.6
Vishal Luthra	890	5.4
Roberto Maglalang	438	2.6

== External sources ==
- Official website
- Law Enforcement Review Board decision 002-2008
