= Edmonton Griesbach =

Federal electoral district in Alberta, Canada

Alberta electoral district
- Interactive map of riding boundaries from the 2025 federal election

Federal electoral district
- Legislature: House of Commons
MP
Kerry Diotte
Conservative
- District created: 2013
- First contested: 2015
- Last contested: 2025
- District webpage: profile, map

Demographics
- Population (2011): 107,809
- Electors (2019): 82,242
- Area (km²): 46
- Pop. density (per km²): 2,343.7
- Census division: Division No. 11
- Census subdivision: Edmonton (part)

Edmonton Griesbach is a federal electoral district in Alberta. Edmonton Griesbach was created by the 2012 federal electoral boundaries redistribution and was legally defined in the 2013 representation order. It came into effect upon the call of the 42nd Canadian federal election, scheduled for 19 October 2015. It was created out of parts of the electoral districts of Edmonton East and Edmonton—St. Albert. The riding name refers to Griesbach, Edmonton.

== Demographics ==
According to the 2011 Canadian census; 2013 representation

Languages: 71.8% English, 4.1% Chinese, 2.5% Ukrainian, 2.5% French, 2.3% Arabic, 1.8% Vietnamese, 1.7% Spanish, 1.2% Italian, 1.2% Tagalog, 1.1% Portuguese, 1.1% German, 1.0% Polish
Religions: 57.4% Christian (28.2% Catholic, 4.9% United Church, 3.2% Christian Orthodox, 2.7% Anglican, 2.2% Lutheran, 1.4% Pentecostal, 1.3% Baptist, 13.5% Other), 6.9% Muslim, 3.3% Buddhist, 31.0% No religion
Median income (2010): $29,059
Average income (2010): $36,696

Panethnic groups in Edmonton Griesbach (2011−2021)
Panethnic group	2021		2016		2011	
Panethnic group	Pop.	%	Pop.	%	Pop.	%
European (Note: Statistic includes all persons that did not make up part of a visible minority or an indigenous identity.)	60,215	55.53%	63,745	59.02%	67,740	65.92%
African	11,435	10.55%	9,920	9.18%	6,175	6.01%
Indigenous	11,080	10.22%	10,865	10.06%	9,610	9.35%
Southeast Asian (Note: Statistic includes total responses of "Filipino" and "Southeast Asian" under visible minority section on census.)	8,810	8.12%	7,320	6.78%	5,580	5.43%
Middle Eastern (Note: Statistic includes total responses of "West Asian" and "Arab" under visible minority section on census.)	5,690	5.25%	4,900	4.54%	3,150	3.07%
East Asian (Note: Statistic includes total responses of "Chinese", "Korean", and "Japanese" under visible minority section on census.)	4,250	3.92%	5,025	4.65%	5,240	5.1%
South Asian	2,635	2.43%	2,675	2.48%	1,765	1.72%
Latin American	2,490	2.3%	2,100	1.94%	2,195	2.14%
Other/Multiracial (Note: Statistic includes total responses of "Visible minority, n.i.e." and "Multiple visible minorities" under visible minority section on census.)	1,820	1.68%	1,465	1.36%	1,300	1.27%
Total responses	108,435	97.08%	108,010	96.19%	102,755	95.31%
Total population	111,699	100%	112,287	100%	107,809	100%
Notes: Totals greater than 100% due to multiple origin responses. Demographics based on 2012 Canadian federal electoral redistribution riding boundaries.

== Members of Parliament ==
This riding has elected the following members of the House of Commons of Canada:

Parliament	Years	Member	Party
Edmonton Griesbach; Riding created from Edmonton East and Edmonton—St. Albert
42nd	2015–2019	Kerry Diotte	Conservative
43rd	2019–2021	Kerry Diotte	Conservative
44th	2021–2025	Blake Desjarlais	New Democratic
45th	2025–present	Kerry Diotte	Conservative

== Election results ==
View source data.
Graph of election results in Edmonton Greisbach (minor parties that never got 2% of the vote or didn't run consistently are omitted)

=== 2023 representation order ===
2025 Canadian federal election
Party	Candidate	Votes	%	±%	Expenditures
Conservative	Kerry Diotte	22,256	45.45	+9.14	$104,512.29
New Democratic	Blake Desjarlais	16,717	34.14	–6.22	$133,835.80
Liberal	Patrick Lennox	8,973	18.32	+3.15	$29,883.76
People's	Thomas Matty	318	0.65	–5.29	none listed
Green	Michael Hunter	302	0.62	–0.51	none listed
Communist	Alex Boykowich	146	0.30	+0.03	none listed
Independent	Crystal Vargas	118	0.24	–	none listed
Canadian Future	Brent Tyson	72	0.15	–	$835.32
Marxist–Leninist	Mary Joyce	64	0.13	–0.12	none listed
Total valid votes/expense limit		48,966	99.10	–	$132,162.35
Total rejected ballots		446	0.90	–0.24	
Turnout		49,412	56.75	+3.43	
Eligible voters		87,071			
Conservative notional gain from New Democratic		Swing		+7.68	
Source: Elections Canada

2021 federal election redistributed results
Party	Vote	%
New Democratic	17,429	40.36
Conservative	15,681	36.31
Liberal	6,552	15.17
People's	2,567	5.94
Green	489	1.13
Others	466	1.08

=== 2013 representation order ===
2021 Canadian federal election
Party	Candidate	Votes	%	±%	Expenditures
New Democratic	Blake Desjarlais	17,457	40.54	+15.41	$83,159.87
Conservative	Kerry Diotte	15,957	37.06	–14.30	$76,024.95
Liberal	Habiba Mohamud	5,979	13.89	–3.36	$62,467.37
People's	Thomas Matty	2,617	6.08	+3.79	$6,908.51
Green	Heather Lau	538	1.25	–1.28	none listed
Libertarian	Morgan Watson	268	0.62	–	none listed
Communist	Alex Boykowich	140	0.33	–0.03	none listed
Marxist–Leninist	Mary Joyce	103	0.24	+0.05	none listed
Total valid votes/expense limit		43,059	98.86	–	$111,212.30
Total rejected ballots		495	1.14	+0.47	
Turnout		43,554	53.32	–3.52	
Eligible voters		81,685			
New Democratic gain from Conservative		Swing		+14.86	
Source: Elections Canada

2019 Canadian federal election
Party	Candidate	Votes	%	±%	Expenditures
Conservative	Kerry Diotte	24,120	51.36	+11.40	$74,918.60
New Democratic	Mark Cherrington	11,800	25.13	–8.89	$46,886.64
Liberal	Habiba Mohamud	8,100	17.25	–4.44	$66,800.39
Green	Safi Khan	1,189	2.53	+0.18	$1,016.70
People's	Barbara Ellen Nichols	1,074	2.29	–	$2,912.29
Independent	Andrzej Gudanowski	216	0.46	–	none listed
Christian Heritage	Christine Alva Armas	203	0.43	–	$971.25
Communist	Alex Boykowich	170	0.36	–	$476.56
Marxist–Leninist	Mary Joyce	91	0.19	–0.04	none listed
Total valid votes/expense limit		46,963	99.33	–	$109,301.88
Total rejected ballots		319	0.67	+0.07	
Turnout		47,282	56.84	–2.25	
Eligible voters		83,188			
Conservative hold		Swing		+10.15	
Source: Elections Canada

2015 Canadian federal election
Party	Candidate	Votes	%	±%	Expenditures
Conservative	Kerry Diotte	19,157	39.96	–12.55	$93,048.30
New Democratic	Janis Irwin	16,309	34.02	–3.45	$150,799.22
Liberal	Brian Gold	10,397	21.69	+15.11	$14,575.14
Green	Heather Workman	1,129	2.35	–1.08	$1,404.61
Libertarian	Maryna Goncharenko	415	0.87	–	$150.44
Marijuana	Linda Northcott	279	0.58	–	none listed
Rhinoceros	Bun Bun Thompson	144	0.30	–	none listed
Marxist–Leninist	Mary Joyce	112	0.23	–	none listed
Total valid votes/expense limit		47,942	99.40	–	$214,842.90
Total rejected ballots		289	0.60	–	
Turnout		48,231	59.09	–	
Eligible voters		81,625			
Conservative hold		Swing		–4.55	
Source: Elections Canada

2011 federal election redistributed results
Party	Vote	%
Conservative	19,832	52.51
New Democratic	14,151	37.47
Liberal	2,484	6.58
Green	1,299	3.44

== See also ==
- List of Canadian electoral districts
- Historical federal electoral districts of Canada
