= David Thomas King =

Canadian politician (born 1946)

The Honourable David Thomas King ECA

Member of the Legislative Assembly of Alberta for Edmonton-Highlands
- In office August 30, 1971 – May 7, 1986
- Preceded by: Riding established
- Succeeded by: Pam Barrett

Minister of Education
- In office March 23, 1979 – February 5, 1986

Minister of Technology, Research and Telecommunications
- In office February 6, 1986 – May 25, 1986

Personal details
- Born: June 22, 1946 (age 80) Perth, Ontario
- Party: Progressive Conservative Party of Alberta
- Spouse: Married
- Education: University of Alberta

David Thomas King ECA (born June 22, 1946) is a retired Canadian politician and public education policy activist. He was a Progressive Conservative Member of the Legislative Assembly of Alberta from August 1971 until April 1986, during which time he served as Legislative Secretary to then Premier Peter Lougheed (1971–1976), Minister of Education (1979–1986), and Minister of Technology, Research, and Telecommunications (1986). As a Member of the Legislative Assembly, King introduced a Bill to repeal the Sexual Sterilization Act stating that the "Act violates fundamental human rights".

While serving as Minister of Education, King chaired the Council of Ministers of Education of Canada in 1984–85. King was also responsible for the Ministry of Education during the termination of James Keegstra (1934–2014), a public high school teacher in Eckville, Alberta, who taught anti-Jewish views and believed in a Jewish conspiracy bent on world domination and annihilating Christianity. Keegstra was eventually convicted of promoting hatred under the Criminal Code in the case R v Keegstra.

In the 1986 general election, he lost his seat to future Alberta New Democratic Party leader Pam Barrett. In 1992, King ran unsuccessfully for the leadership of the Progressive Conservative Association of Alberta. The winner of the contest would have become premier without a general election. He came in last place out of nine candidates on the first ballot and was eliminated. From February 1990 until July 2010, he served as executive director of the Public School Boards' Association of Alberta. In 2010 King was recognized by the Alberta Teachers' Association and the Canadian Teachers' Federation for his years of service to education, noting that as minister of education, he was responsible for major initiatives, including the computer technology in schools program, the teacher internship program and the designated community schools program.

In 2017, the Edmonton Public School District named a new K–9 school after David Thomas King, in recognition of King's advocacy on behalf of public education.

David is now active with the Green Party of British Columbia, having served on the Provincial Council. He served as one of the BC Greens' two provincial campaign co-chairs for the 2013 BC provincial election.
