= Brian Mason =

Canadian politician (born 1953)

The Honourable Brian Mason ECA
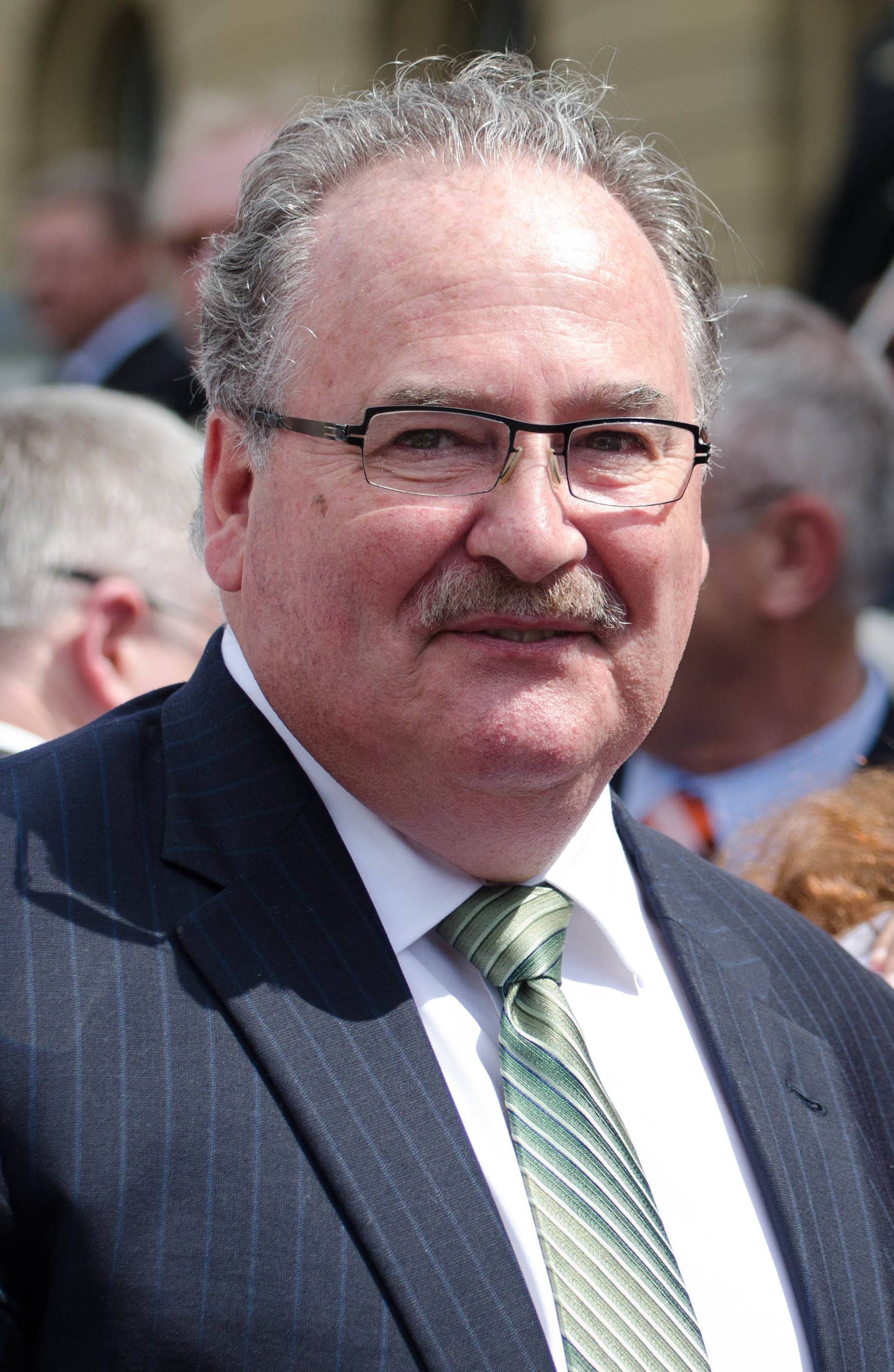
- Mason in 2015

Minister of Transportation (Note: Office known as "Minister of Infrastructure and Transportation" from May 24, 2015 to October 17, 2017.)
- In office May 24, 2015 – April 29, 2019
- Premier: Rachel Notley
- Preceded by: Wayne Drysdale
- Succeeded by: Ric McIver

Leader of the Alberta New Democratic Party
- In office July 13, 2004 – October 18, 2014; Interim: July 13, 2004 – September 18, 2004
- Preceded by: Raj Pannu
- Succeeded by: Rachel Notley

Member of the Legislative Assembly of Alberta for Edmonton-Highlands-Norwood (Edmonton-Highlands; 2000–2004)
- In office June 12, 2000 – April 15, 2019
- Preceded by: Pam Barrett
- Succeeded by: Janis Irwin

Personal details
- Born: Brian David Mason; October 12, 1953 (age 72) Calgary, Alberta, Canada
- Party: Alberta New Democratic Party
- Education: University of Alberta
- Occupation: Politician, bus driver
- Portfolio: Minister of Infrastructure, Minister of Transportation

Brian David Mason ECA (born October 12, 1953) is a Canadian politician who was leader of the Alberta New Democratic Party from 2004 to 2014 and served as the Minister of Transportation in Rachel Notley's NDP government. He also served as the Government House Leader. Mason was first elected as a Member of the Legislative Assembly of Alberta for the now-defunct riding of Edmonton Highlands in a 2000 byelection. He was subsequently re-elected, and was elected in Edmonton-Highlands-Norwood after the riding was created in 2004. He chose not to seek re-election in 2019, and was succeeded by Janis Irwin. Mason was the longest serving NDP MLA in Alberta history, with a political career spanning more than 20 years.

== Early political involvement ==
Mason was born in Calgary in 1953, the son of Robert George Mason, an electrical engineer, and a Red Tory who was a founding member of the Reform Party of Canada. Robert Mason, was also the stepson of Conservative Senator John Alexander Buchanan. Mason's mother, Patricia Kavanagh was a Liberal.

Mason first became politically active in the mid-1970s while studying political science at the University of Alberta. He served as executive director of the Federation of Alberta Students from 1977 to 1979. While there he boarded at the traditionally Tory fraternity Phi Gamma Delta and was roommates with future Progressive Conservative Premier Dave Hancock, who teased him by calling him a communist. Upon leaving university Mason began working as bus driver with the Edmonton Transit Service.

== Municipal politics ==
Mason first ran for Edmonton city council after he was temporarily laid off from ETS in 1983, before becoming president of the Edmonton Voters Association, a municipal political party. He tried again for a seat on the council in 1989 with a dynamic campaign running in Ward 3. Mason's campaign came with a legal challenge he mounted against a provincial law forbidding municipal employees from running as candidates in a civic election unless they resigned their position with the city.

The legal challenge was unsuccessful, however Mason was elected city councillor for Ward 3 in October 1989. Shortly after the election the law Mason challenged was repealed, and municipal workers in Edmonton were subsequently allowed to run for civic office without resigning their positions. Mason remained on city council until 2000, when he ran for political office for the New Democratic Party.

== Provincial politics ==
In 2000, following the mid-term resignation of then leader of the Alberta New Democrats and MLA for Edmonton Highlands Pam Barrett, Mason left city council and ran for the NDP in the ensuing by-election. He held the Legislative Assembly seat with a strong majority, and was re-elected in the 2001 provincial election.

=== Alberta NDP Leader ===
Mason was appointed the role of interim party leader for the NDP following the resignation of then leader Raj Pannu in July 2004. He became the official leader of Alberta's NDP on September 18, 2004, following a vote at the party convention.

Mason held his seat during the provincial election in 2004, which saw the caucus welcome the return of former leaders Pannu and Ray Martin, along with newcomer David Eggen. In the provincial election of 2008 Mason again retained his seat, and was joined in caucus by newly elected NDP MLA Rachel Notley from Edmonton-Strathcona, the seat previously held by Pannu.

In the 2012 provincial election the NDP picked up two seats in Edmonton, regaining their previous four seat total. Both Notley and Mason safely held onto their seats while David Eggen was re-elected as the member for Edmonton-Calder. Newcomer Deron Bilous was also elected in Edmonton-Beverly-Clareview, the seat formerly held by Martin. In many other ridings the party also won more votes than it had attained previously.

On April 29, 2014, Brian Mason announced that he would step down as leader as soon as a leadership election could be held to choose his successor. Mason who had mentored Rachel Notley convinced her to run for the leadership which she won. During the final few months of Mason's tenure the party was already enjoying strong polling in Edmonton, something which would eventually grow into the larger electoral sweep that the Alberta NDP managed in the 2015 provincial election under Mason's successor Notley that resulted in the formation of Alberta's first ever NDP government.

=== Member of Notley cabinet ===
On May 24, 2015, Mason was appointed Minister of Infrastructure and Minister of Transportation, as well as Government House Leader.

Mason announced on July 4, 2018 that he would not seek re-election in the 2019 provincial election. He remained as a minister until April 30, 2019, when the new United Conservative Party government of Jason Kenney was sworn in.

Mason endorsed Alberta MP Heather McPherson in the 2026 New Democratic Party leadership election.

== Edmonton provincial election riding results, 2000 to 2015 ==
=== 2000 by-election ===
Alberta provincial by-election, Monday, June 12, 2000: Edmonton-Highlands following the resignation of Ms. Pamela Barrett on February 2, 2000
Party	Candidate	Votes	%	±%
New Democratic	Brian Mason	4,863	59.04	+8.40
Liberal	Terry Kirkland	1,508	18.31	-2.21
Progressive Conservative	Barbara Fung	1,406	17.07	-8.02
Alberta First	John Reil	270	3.28	–
Social Credit	Pat Hansard	156	1.89	-1.87
Independent	Adil Pirbhai	34	0.41	–
Total		8,237	100.00	–
Rejected, spoiled, and declined		28	–	–
Eligible electors / turnout		19,714	41.92	-17.19
New Democratic hold		Swing		+5.30
Source(s) Alberta. Chief Electoral Officer (2000). The Report of the Chief Electoral Officer on the Edmonton-Highlands By-election held June 12, 2000 and the Red Deer-North By-election held September 25, 2000 (PDF) (Report). Edmonton: Legislative Assembly of Alberta; Chief Electoral Officer.

=== 2001 general election ===
2001 Alberta general election: Edmonton-Highlands
Party	Candidate	Votes	%	±%
New Democratic	Brian Mason	4,641	46.23	-12.81
Progressive Conservative	Robert Bilida	3,477	34.63	+17.57
Liberal	Kim Cassady	1,921	19.14	+0.83
Total		10,039	100.00	–
Rejected, spoiled, and declined		35	–	–
Eligible electors / turnout		21,539	46.77	+4.85
New Democratic hold		Swing		-15.19
Source(s) "Results for Edmonton-Highlands". Heritage Community Foundation.

=== 2004 general election ===
2004 Alberta general election: Edmonton-Highlands-Norwood
Party	Candidate	Votes	%	±%
New Democratic	Brian Mason	6,054	62.62%	–
Progressive Conservative	Terry Martiniuk	2,208	22.84%	–
Liberal	Jason Manzevich	1,035	10.71%	–
Alberta Alliance	Ray Loyer	305	3.15%	–
Independent	Dale W. Ferris	66	0.68%	–
Total		9,668	–	–
Rejected, spoiled and declined		54	36	1
Eligible electors / turnout		22,832	42.58%	–
New Democratic pickup new district.				
Source(s) Source: "00 - Edmonton-Highlands-Norwood, 2004 Alberta general election". officialresults.elections.ab.ca. Elections Alberta. Alberta. Chief Electoral Officer (2005). Report of the Chief Electoral Officer on the General Enumeration and General Election of the Twenty-sixth Legislative Assembly (Report). Edmonton: Alberta Legislative Assembly, Office of the Chief Electoral Officer.

=== 2008 general election ===
2008 Alberta general election: Edmonton-Highlands-Norwood
Party	Candidate	Votes	%	±%
New Democratic	Brian Mason	4,754	50.95%	-11.67%
Progressive Conservative	Andrew Beniuk	2,978	31.92%	9.08%
Liberal	Brad Smith	1,132	12.13%	1.43%
Wildrose Alliance	Travis Loewen	245	2.63%	-0.52%
Green	Mohamed Maie	221	2.37%	–
Total		9,330	–	–
Rejected, spoiled and declined		11	27	1
Eligible electors / turnout		27,079	34.50%	-8.09%
New Democratic hold		Swing		-10.37%
Source(s) Source: "33 - Edmonton-Highlands-Norwood, 2008 Alberta general election". officialresults.elections.ab.ca. Elections Alberta. Chief Electoral Officer (2008). The Report on the March 3, 2008 Provincial General Election of the Twenty-Seventh Legislative Assembly (Report). Edmonton, Alta.: Elections Alberta.

=== 2012 general election ===
2012 Alberta general election: Edmonton-Highlands-Norwood
Party	Candidate	Votes	%	±%
New Democratic	Brian Mason	6,824	54.16%	3.21%
Progressive Conservative	Cristina Basualdo	2,778	22.05%	-9.87%
Wildrose Alliance	Wayde Lever	2,022	16.05%	13.42%
Liberal	Keegan Wynychuk	587	4.66%	-7.47%
Alberta Party	Cam McCormick	200	1.59%	–
Evergreen	Dari Lynn	188	1.49%	-0.88%
Total		12,599	–	–
Rejected, spoiled and declined		115	63	6
Eligible electors / turnout		28,251	45.02%	10.53%
New Democratic hold		Swing		+3.21%
Source(s) Source: "36 - Edmonton-Highlands-Norwood, 2012 Alberta general election". officialresults.elections.ab.ca. Elections Alberta. Chief Electoral Officer (2012). The Report of the Chief Electoral Officer on the 2011 Provincial Enumeration and Monday, April 23, 2012 Provincial General Election of the Twenty-eighth Legislative Assembly (PDF) (Report). Edmonton, Alta.: Elections Alberta. Archived (PDF) from the original on May 6, 2021.

=== 2015 general election ===
2015 Alberta general election: Edmonton-Highlands-Norwood
Party	Candidate	Votes	%	±%
New Democratic	Brian Mason	11,555	78.11%	23.94%
Progressive Conservative	Jonathan Weiqun Dai	1,778	12.02%	-10.03%
Wildrose	Joshua Loeppky	967	6.54%	-9.51%
Liberal	Matthew R. Smith	494	3.34%	-1.32%
Total		14,794	–	–
Rejected, spoiled and declined		81	45	34
Eligible electors / turnout		34,163	43.64%	-1.38%
New Democratic hold		Swing		16.99%
Source(s) Source: "36 - Edmonton-Highlands-Norwood, 2015 Alberta general election". officialresults.elections.ab.ca. Elections Alberta. Chief Electoral Officer (2016). 2015 General Election. A Report of the Chief Electoral Officer (PDF) (Report). Edmonton, Alta.: Elections Alberta.
