= Janis Irwin =

Canadian politician (born 1984)

Janis Irwin MLA
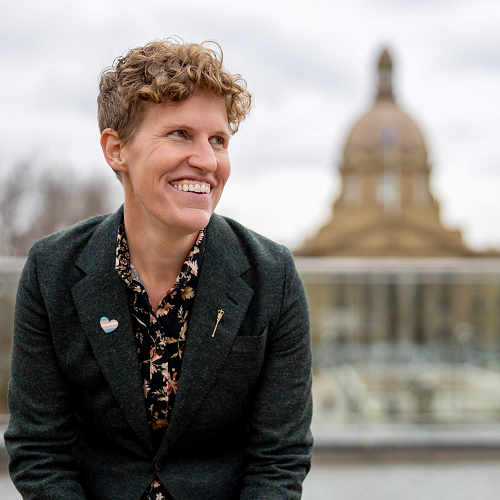

Member of the Legislative Assembly of Alberta for Edmonton-Highlands-Norwood
- Incumbent
- Assumed office April 16, 2019
- Preceded by: Brian Mason

Personal details
- Born: September 9, 1984 (age 41) Barrhead, Alberta, Canada
- Party: Alberta NDP
- Education: University of Alberta (BEd); University of Calgary (MEd)
- Occupation: Teacher, civil servant
- Website: janisirwin.ca

Janis Irwin (born September 9, 1984) is a Canadian politician who was elected to the Legislative Assembly of Alberta in the 2019 Alberta general election, and re-elected in the 2023 Alberta General Election. She represents the electoral district of Edmonton-Highlands-Norwood as a member of the Alberta New Democratic Party. She serves as the Official Opposition Critic for Housing. She previously served as the Critic for Status of Women and 2SLGBTQ+ Issues, and is the Official Opposition Deputy Whip.

A teacher prior to her election, Irwin previously ran as the federal New Democratic Party candidate for Edmonton Griesbach in the 2015 Canadian federal election.

== Personal life ==
Irwin grew up in Barrhead, Alberta. Prior to being elected, Irwin was a high school social studies teacher in Bawlf, Alberta and served as vice-principal in Forestburg, Alberta. Irwin came out in her late 20s. In 2010, Irwin moved to Edmonton to start working with Alberta Education, focusing on curriculum.

== Education ==
Irwin holds a Bachelor of Education from the University of Alberta, a Master of Education from the University of Calgary, and completed PhD-level coursework at the University of Alberta without defending her thesis.

== Provincial politics ==
As the only openly gay MLA in the Alberta legislature, Irwin has faced backlash for being outspoken against social injustices. In her first term as Member of the Legislative Assembly of Alberta, Irwin advocated against conversion therapy by citing the harmful organization Journey Canada with its ties to this practice. Another issue Irwin strongly advocated on was the legal protections of gay-straight alliances (GSAs) in the education system in Alberta.

In her second term as the Critic for Housing, Irwin has been vocal, calling for action on skyrocketing rents. Irwin has tabled Bill 205, the Housing Security Act, which would bring in temporary rent caps.

Irwin has also been a voice for her unhoused constituents, calling for an end to encampment sweeps and urging immediate investments in affordable and permanent supportive housing.

As of June 21, 2024, she also serves as the chair of the Legislature's Public Accounts Committee.

== Electoral history ==
=== 2015 federal election ===
2015 Canadian federal election: Edmonton Griesbach
Party	Candidate	Votes	%	±%	Expenditures
Conservative	Kerry Diotte	19,157	39.96	–12.55	$93,048.30
New Democratic	Janis Irwin	16,309	34.02	–3.45	$150,799.22
Liberal	Brian Gold	10,397	21.69	+15.11	$14,575.14
Green	Heather Workman	1,129	2.35	–1.08	$1,404.61
Libertarian	Maryna Goncharenko	415	0.87	–	$150.44
Marijuana	Linda Northcott	279	0.58	–	none listed
Rhinoceros	Bun Bun Thompson	144	0.30	–	none listed
Marxist–Leninist	Mary Joyce	112	0.23	–	none listed
Total valid votes/expense limit		47,942	99.40	–	$214,842.90
Total rejected ballots		289	0.60	–	
Turnout		48,231	59.09	–	
Eligible voters		81,625			
Conservative hold		Swing		–4.55	
Source: Elections Canada

=== 2019 general election ===
2019 Alberta general election: Edmonton-Highlands-Norwood
Party	Candidate	Votes	%	±%
New Democratic	Janis Irwin	9,998	63.45%	-14.66%
United Conservative	Leila Houle	4,015	25.48%	6.92%
Alberta Party	Tish Prouse	1,057	6.71%	–
Green	Taz Bouchier	243	1.54%	–
Alberta Independence	Joe Hankins	226	1.43%	–
Alberta Advantage	Chris Poplatek	116	0.74%	–
Communist	Alex S. Boykowich	103	0.65%	–
Total		15,758	–	–
Rejected, spoiled and declined		70	88	8
Eligible electors / turnout		30,596	51.76%	8.12%
New Democratic hold		Swing		-14.06%
Source(s) Source: "34 - Edmonton-Highlands-Norwood, 2019 Alberta general election". officialresults.elections.ab.ca. Elections Alberta. Alberta. Chief Electoral Officer (2019). 2019 General Election. A Report of the Chief Electoral Officer. Volume II (PDF) (Report). Vol. 2. Edmonton, Alta.: Elections Alberta. pp. 132–135. ISBN 978-1-988620-12-1.

=== 2023 general election ===
2023 Alberta general election: Edmonton-Highlands-Norwood
Party	Candidate	Votes	%	±%
New Democratic	Janis Irwin	9,491	71.46	+8.01
United Conservative	Nick Kalynchuk	3,350	25.22	-0.26
Green	Kristine Kowalchuk	339	2.55	+1.01
Communist	Naomi Rankin	102	0.77	+0.11
Total		13,282	99.01	–
Rejected and declined		133	0.99	
Turnout		13,415	45.22	
Eligible voters		29,665		
New Democratic hold		Swing		+4.13
Source(s) Source: Elections Alberta
