= Alice Hanson =

Canadian politician (1927–2009)

Alice Ann Hanson

Member of the Legislative Assembly of Alberta
- In office June 15, 1993 – March 11, 1997
- Preceded by: New District
- Succeeded by: District Abolished
- Constituency: Edmonton-Highlands-Beverly

Personal details
- Born: May 6, 1927 Edmonton, Alberta, Canada
- Died: February 7, 2009 (aged 81) Edmonton, Alberta, Canada
- Party: Liberal
- Occupation: Politician

Alice Ann Hanson (née Brown; May 6, 1927 – February 7, 2009) was a Canadian politician from Alberta. She served in the Legislative Assembly of Alberta from 1993 to 1997 as a member of the Liberal caucus in opposition.

== Political career ==
Hanson ran for a seat in the Alberta Legislature as a Liberal candidate in the electoral district of Edmonton-Highlands-Beverly in the 1993 general election. She defeated incumbent John McInnis and future MLA Ron Liepert.

Hanson served as the Native Affairs Critic and Social Services Critic for the official opposition. She did not run for re-election in 1997.
