= Edmonton-Highlands-Norwood =

Provincial electoral district in Alberta, Canada

Coordinates: 53.57°N 113.46°W

Alberta electoral district
- Edmonton-Highlands-Norwood within the City of Edmonton, 2017 boundaries

Provincial electoral district
- Legislature: Legislative Assembly of Alberta
MLA
Janis Irwin
New Democratic
- District created: 2003
- First contested: 2004
- Last contested: 2023

Edmonton-Highlands-Norwood is a provincial electoral district for the Legislative Assembly of Alberta, Canada. The district was created in 2004 when it was merged with Edmonton-Highlands and Edmonton-Norwood. This inner-city northeast Edmonton riding has the second lowest average income in Alberta, as well as being one of the most ethnically diverse. This riding and its predecessor ridings have voted NDP in six of the last seven elections.

Neighbourhoods in this riding include: Highlands, Bellevue, Montrose, Newton, Virginia Park, Cromdale, Parkdale, Alberta Avenue, Boyle Street, McCauley, Eastwood & Riverdale.

The riding is currently held by the Alberta NDP's Janis Irwin.

== History ==
The electoral district was created in the 2003 boundary redistribution after the electoral districts of Edmonton-Highlands and Edmonton-Norwood were merged.

The 2010 boundary redistribution saw significant boundary changes as all land west of 50 street was ceded to Edmonton-Beverly-Clareview. A portion of the west boundary that moved along 97 Street between 105 and 111 Avenue was pushed west to 104 Street that was formerly part of Edmonton-Centre and minor alterations were made with the north border of Edmonton-Decore.

=== Boundary history ===
33 Edmonton-Highlands-Norwood 2003 boundaries
Bordering districts
North	East	West	South
Edmonton-Beverly-Clareview and Edmonton-Decore	Sherwood Park	Edmonton-Calder	Edmonton-Centre and Edmonton-Gold Bar
riding map goes here			
Legal description from the Statutes of Alberta 2003, Electoral Divisions Act.
Starting at the intersection of 97 Street with the Canadian National Railway (CNR) line; then 1. east along the CNR line to 66 Street; 2. south along 66 Street to Yellowhead Trail; 3. east along Yellowhead Trail to 50 Street; 4. south along 50 Street to 118 Avenue; 5. east along 118 Avenue to Victoria Trail; 6. northeast along Victoria Trail to the eastbound lanes of Yellowhead Trail; 7. east along the eastbound lanes of Yellowhead Trail to the right bank of the North Saskatchewan River; 8. generally southwest and west along the right bank of the North Saskatchewan River to the southerly extension of 82 Street; 9. north along the extension of 82 Street to Jasper Avenue; 10. southwest along Jasper Avenue to 84 Street; 11. north along 84 Street to the Light Rail Transit (LRT) line; 12. northeast along the LRT line to 112 Avenue; 13. west along 112 Avenue and Norwood Boulevard to 97 Street; 14. north along 97 Street to the starting point.
Note: New district

36 Edmonton-Highlands-Norwood 2010 boundaries
Bordering districts
North	East	West	South
Edmonton-Beverly-Clareview and Edmonton-Decore	Edmonton-Beverly-Clareview	Edmonton-Calder and Edmonton-Centre	Edmonton-Gold Bar and Edmontons-Strathcona
Note: Boundary descriptions were not used in the 2010 redistribution

=== Representation history ===
Edmonton-Highlands-Norwood
Assembly	Years	Member	Party
Riding created from Edmonton-Highlands and Edmonton-Norwood
26th	2004–2008	Brian Mason	New Democratic
27th	2008–2012	Brian Mason	New Democratic
28th	2012–2015	Brian Mason	New Democratic
29th	2015–2019	Brian Mason	New Democratic
30th	2019–2023	Janis Irwin	New Democratic
31st	2023–Present	Janis Irwin	New Democratic

The electoral district was created in the 2004 boundary redistribution by combining the old Edmonton-Highlands and Edmonton-Norwood electoral districts. The first election in the district was won by NDP leader Brian Mason who won a landslide with over 60% of the popular vote.

Mason was re-elected in the 2008 general election against former MLA Andrew Beniuk. He won a slightly reduced majority but still won over half the popular vote. In the 2015 election, Mason was re-elected in a landslide, becoming the longest-serving MLA in the NDP government.

== Election results ==
=== 2023 ===
2023 Alberta general election
Party	Candidate	Votes	%	±%
New Democratic	Janis Irwin	9,491	71.46	+8.01
United Conservative	Nick Kalynchuk	3,350	25.22	-0.26
Green	Kristine Kowalchuk	339	2.55	+1.01
Communist	Naomi Rankin	102	0.77	+0.11
Total		13,282	99.01	–
Rejected and declined		133	0.99	
Turnout		13,415	45.22	
Eligible voters		29,665		
New Democratic hold		Swing		+4.13
Source(s) Source: Elections Alberta

=== 2019 ===
2019 Alberta general election
Party	Candidate	Votes	%	±%
New Democratic	Janis Irwin	9,998	63.45%	-14.66%
United Conservative	Leila Houle	4,015	25.48%	6.92%
Alberta Party	Tish Prouse	1,057	6.71%	–
Green	Taz Bouchier	243	1.54%	–
Alberta Independence	Joe Hankins	226	1.43%	–
Alberta Advantage	Chris Poplatek	116	0.74%	–
Communist	Alex S. Boykowich	103	0.65%	–
Total		15,758	–	–
Rejected, spoiled and declined		70	88	8
Eligible electors / turnout		30,596	51.76%	8.12%
New Democratic hold		Swing		-14.06%
Source(s) Source: "34 - Edmonton-Highlands-Norwood, 2019 Alberta general election". officialresults.elections.ab.ca. Elections Alberta. Alberta. Chief Electoral Officer (2019). 2019 General Election. A Report of the Chief Electoral Officer. Volume II (PDF) (Report). Vol. 2. Edmonton, Alta.: Elections Alberta. pp. 132–135. ISBN 978-1-988620-12-1.

=== 2015 ===
2015 Alberta general election
Party	Candidate	Votes	%	±%
New Democratic	Brian Mason	11,555	78.11%	23.94%
Progressive Conservative	Jonathan Weiqun Dai	1,778	12.02%	-10.03%
Wildrose	Joshua Loeppky	967	6.54%	-9.51%
Liberal	Matthew R. Smith	494	3.34%	-1.32%
Total		14,794	–	–
Rejected, spoiled and declined		81	45	34
Eligible electors / turnout		34,163	43.64%	-1.38%
New Democratic hold		Swing		16.99%
Source(s) Source: "36 - Edmonton-Highlands-Norwood, 2015 Alberta general election". officialresults.elections.ab.ca. Elections Alberta. Chief Electoral Officer (2016). 2015 General Election. A Report of the Chief Electoral Officer (PDF) (Report). Edmonton, Alta.: Elections Alberta.

=== 2012 ===
2012 Alberta general election
Party	Candidate	Votes	%	±%
New Democratic	Brian Mason	6,824	54.16%	3.21%
Progressive Conservative	Cristina Basualdo	2,778	22.05%	-9.87%
Wildrose Alliance	Wayde Lever	2,022	16.05%	13.42%
Liberal	Keegan Wynychuk	587	4.66%	-7.47%
Alberta Party	Cam McCormick	200	1.59%	–
Evergreen	Dari Lynn	188	1.49%	-0.88%
Total		12,599	–	–
Rejected, spoiled and declined		115	63	6
Eligible electors / turnout		28,251	45.02%	10.53%
New Democratic hold		Swing		+3.21%
Source(s) Source: "36 - Edmonton-Highlands-Norwood, 2012 Alberta general election". officialresults.elections.ab.ca. Elections Alberta. Chief Electoral Officer (2012). The Report of the Chief Electoral Officer on the 2011 Provincial Enumeration and Monday, April 23, 2012 Provincial General Election of the Twenty-eighth Legislative Assembly (PDF) (Report). Edmonton, Alta.: Elections Alberta. Archived (PDF) from the original on May 6, 2021.

=== 2008 ===
2008 Alberta general election
Party	Candidate	Votes	%	±%
New Democratic	Brian Mason	4,754	50.95%	-11.67%
Progressive Conservative	Andrew Beniuk	2,978	31.92%	9.08%
Liberal	Brad Smith	1,132	12.13%	1.43%
Wildrose Alliance	Travis Loewen	245	2.63%	-0.52%
Green	Mohamed Maie	221	2.37%	–
Total		9,330	–	–
Rejected, spoiled and declined		11	27	1
Eligible electors / turnout		27,079	34.50%	-8.09%
New Democratic hold		Swing		-10.37%
Source(s) Source: "33 - Edmonton-Highlands-Norwood, 2008 Alberta general election". officialresults.elections.ab.ca. Elections Alberta. Chief Electoral Officer (2008). The Report on the March 3, 2008 Provincial General Election of the Twenty-Seventh Legislative Assembly (Report). Edmonton, Alta.: Elections Alberta.

=== 2004 ===
2004 Alberta general election
Party	Candidate	Votes	%	±%
New Democratic	Brian Mason	6,054	62.62%	–
Progressive Conservative	Terry Martiniuk	2,208	22.84%	–
Liberal	Jason Manzevich	1,035	10.71%	–
Alberta Alliance	Ray Loyer	305	3.15%	–
Independent	Dale W. Ferris	66	0.68%	–
Total		9,668	–	–
Rejected, spoiled and declined		54	36	1
Eligible electors / turnout		22,832	42.58%	–
New Democratic pickup new district.				
Source(s) Source: "00 - Edmonton-Highlands-Norwood, 2004 Alberta general election". officialresults.elections.ab.ca. Elections Alberta. Alberta. Chief Electoral Officer (2005). Report of the Chief Electoral Officer on the General Enumeration and General Election of the Twenty-sixth Legislative Assembly (Report). Edmonton: Alberta Legislative Assembly, Office of the Chief Electoral Officer.

== Senate nominee election results ==
=== 2004 ===
2004 Senate nominee election results: Edmonton-Highlands-Norwood				Turnout 43.09%	
Affiliation	Candidate	Votes	% votes	% ballots	Rank
Progressive Conservative	Betty Unger	3,235	14.22%	43.20%	2
Independent	Link Byfield	3,105	13.65%	41.47%	4
Independent	Tom Sindlinger	2,386	10.49%	31.86%	9
Alberta Alliance	Michael Roth	2,347	10.31%	31.34%	7
Progressive Conservative	Bert Brown	2,230	9.80%	29.78%	1
Progressive Conservative	Cliff Breitkreuz	2,194	9.64%	29.30%	3
Alberta Alliance	Vance Gough	2,101	9.23%	28.06%	8
Alberta Alliance	Gary Horan	2,089	9.18%	27.90%	10
Progressive Conservative	David Usherwood	1,603	7.04%	21.41%	6
Progressive Conservative	Jim Silye	1,466	6.44%	19.58%	5
Total votes		22,756	100%		
Total ballots		7,488	3.04 votes per ballot		
Rejected, spoiled and declined		2,350			

Voters had the option of selecting four candidates on the ballot

== Student vote results ==
=== 2004 ===
Participating schools
Delton School
Eastglen High School
Norwood School
R. J. Scott School
St. Nicholas School
St. Alphonsus School

On November 19, 2004, a student vote was conducted at participating Alberta schools to parallel the 2004 Alberta general election results. The vote was designed to educate students and simulate the electoral process for persons who have not yet reached the legal majority. The vote was conducted in 80 of the 83 provincial electoral districts with students voting for actual election candidates. Schools with a large student body that reside in another electoral district had the option to vote for candidates outside of the electoral district then where they were physically located.

2004 Alberta student vote results
Affiliation	Candidate	Votes	%
NDP	Brian Mason	403	58.66%
Liberal	Jason Manzevich	117	17.03%
Progressive Conservative	Terry Martinuk	93	13.54%
Independent	Dale Ferris	42	6.11%
Alberta Alliance	Ray Loyer	32	4.66%
Total		687	100%
Rejected, spoiled and declined		92	

== See also ==
- List of Alberta provincial electoral districts
- Canadian provincial electoral districts
