= Edmonton-Highlands-Beverly =

Defunct provincial electoral district in Alberta, Canada

Coordinates: 53.57°N 113.42°W

Edmonton-Highlands
Alberta electoral district

Defunct provincial electoral district
- Legislature: Legislative Assembly of Alberta
- District created: 1993
- District abolished: 1997
- First contested: 1993
- Last contested: 1993

Edmonton-Highlands-Beverly was a provincial electoral district in Alberta, Canada, mandated to return a single member to the Legislative Assembly of Alberta using the first past the post method of voting from 1993 to 1997.

Edmonton-Highlands-Beverly was contested only once, in 1993. It was created from most of Edmonton-Highlands and part of Edmonton-Beverly, and its name was changed back to Edmonton-Highlands in 1997, with no boundary changes.

== Representation history ==
Member for Edmonton-Highlands-Beverly
Assembly	Years	Member	Party
See Edmonton-Highlands and Edmonton-Beverly 1971–1993
23rd	1993–1997	Alice Hanson	Liberal
See Edmonton-Highlands 1997–2004

The district's only MLA was one-term Liberal member Alice Hanson. She served in opposition and did not run again when the riding was abolished in 1997.

== Election results ==
1993 Alberta general election
Party	Candidate	Votes	%	±%
Liberal	Alice Hanson	5,189	45.59%	+27.17%
Progressive Conservative	Ron Liepert	2,787	24.48%	-2.10%
New Democratic	John McInnis	2,885	25.34%	-29.66%
Social Credit	Tim Friesen	428	3.76%	–
Natural Law	Cliff Kinzel	94	0.83%	–
Total		11,383	–	–
Rejected, spoiled, and declined		31	–	–
Eligible electors / turnout		20,798	54.88%	+1.14%
Liberal notional gain from New Democratic		Swing		+14.63%
Source(s) "Results for Edmonton-Highlands". Heritage Community Foundation. Swing is calculated from the Edmonton-Highlands result in 1989.

== See also ==
- List of Alberta provincial electoral districts
- Canadian provincial electoral districts
